= List of Crusaders Rugby League players =

This page details the honours and statistics of individual players of the Crusaders Rugby League club.

The Celtic Crusaders played their first competitive match on 12 February 2006 against Hemel Stags in the National League Cup. At the start of the 2010 season the club changed its name to Crusaders Rugby League. The club played its final match on 9 September 2011 against Wigan Warriors in the Super League. During this time over 100 players represented the club.

Name	First match	Last match	Played	Tries	Goals	Drop goals	Points	Representative (Note: Bold indicates representative teams played for during time at Crusaders RL)	Notes	Ref
Tony Duggan	2006-02-12	2009-04-03	88	101	0	0	404	-	(Note: National League Two Player of the Season: 2007, UK's top try scorer (all divisions): 2006 (37), 2007 (40))	
Carl De Chenu	2006-02-12	2006-09-10	29	21	0	0	84	Ireland		
Geraint Davies	2006-02-12	2009-09-13	47	7	0	0	28	Wales		
Damien Quinn	2006-02-12	2009-07-25	112	58	190	0	612	-	(Note: National League One Player of the Season: 2008)	
Paul Morgan	2006-02-12	2006-10-01	30	16	0	0	64	Wales		
Luke Young	2006-02-12	2007-08-26	53	17	21	0	110	-		
Jace Van Dijk	2006-02-12	2009-08-16	94	22	125	0	338	-	(Note: National League Two Player of the Season: 2006)	
Ryan Barton	2006-02-12	2006-10-01	28	4	0	0	16	-		
Scott O'Kelly	2006-02-12	2006-06-25	6	2	0	0	8	-		
Hywel Davies	2006-02-12	2007-09-09	53	5	0	0	20	Wales		
Carle Ellis	2006-02-12	2006-06-04	11	0	0	0	0	-		
Phil Cushion	2006-02-12	2007-10-28	47	4	0	0	16	Wales		
Matt Jobson	2006-02-12	2006-07-23	13	8	0	0	32	-		
Lloyd O'Connor	2006-02-12	2006-04-01	5	3	0	0	12	-		
Dean Scully	2006-02-12	2006-07-09	18	0	0	0	0	-		
David Simm	2006-02-12	2006-05-28	16	2	0	0	8	-		
Andy Llewellyn	2006-02-12	2006-04-14	5	0	0	0	0	-		
Dean Fitzgerald	2006-02-19	2007-07-07	39	8	0	0	32	-		
Michael Ryan	2006-02-19	2006-10-01	24	21	0	0	84	-		
Lenny Woodard	2006-02-19	2006-04-30	10	4	0	0	16	Wales		
Grant Epton	2006-02-26	2007-09-09	33	15	0	0	60	-		
Karl Hocking	2006-02-26	2006-07-26	15	9	0	0	36	Wales		
Marcus Sainsbury	2006-02-26	2006-03-26	4	3	0	0	12	-		
Lee Williams	2006-03-12	2006-09-09	14	2	4	0	16	Wales		
Richard Johnston	2006-03-19	2007-07-22	27	14	13	0	90	Wales	(Note: Rugby League Record Keepers and CrusadersRFL.com have one profile for Richard Johnston. Rugby League Project lists two profiles: Richard Johnson (2006-03-29 to 2006-07-16, P12 T2 G13 34Pts) and Richard Johnston (2007-02-09 to 2007-07-22, P17 T12 48Pts))	
Kevin Ellis	2006-03-19	2006-04-30	3	1	0	0	4	Great Britain, Wales		
Gareth James	2006-03-19	2006-03-19	1	0	0	0	0	-		
Neil Dixon	2006-03-26	2006-07-02	3	5	0	0	20	-		
Michael Hook	2006-03-26	2006-06-11	8	1	6	0	16	-		
Shawn van Rensburg	2006-04-09	2006-06-25	12	0	0	0	0	-		
Anthony Seibold	2006-04-09	2006-10-01	12	4	0	0	16	-		
Darren Ryan	2006-04-23	2006-04-23	1	0	0	0	0	-		
Steven Brown	2006-05-07	2006-05-07	1	0	0	0	0	-		
Lee Jones	2006-06-04	2006-05-26	10	0	0	0	0	-		
Aled James	2006-06-11	2011-07-09	23	6	0	0	24	Wales		
Gareth Dean	2006-06-18	2008-09-11	61	4	0	0	16	Wales		
Matt Hill	2006-07-16	2006-10-01	10	6	0	0	24	-		
Neale Wyatt	2006-07-23	2008-09-28	40	8	0	0	32			
Chris Beasley	2006-07-23	2009-09-05	76	5	1	0	22	Wales		
Gareth Price	2006-07-30	2006-10-01	8	0	0	0	0	Wales		
Mark Dalle Cort	2007-02-09	2009-08-16	83	30	0	0	120	-		
Anthony Blackwood	2007-02-09	2009-09-13	68	30	0	0	120	Wales		
Paul Ballard	2007-02-09	2009-05-03	51	40	0	0	160	-		
Josh Cale	2007-02-09	2007-08-18	21	2	0	0	8	-		
Neil Budworth	2007-02-09	2009-09-13	83	11	0	0	44	Wales		
Darren Mapp	2007-02-09	2009-06-13	61	17	0	0	68	-		
Rob Toshack	2007-02-09	2007-09-09	24	12	0	0	48	-		
Jamie I'Anson	2007-02-09	2008-07-19	44	2	0	0	8	-		
Craig Richards	2007-02-17	2007-05-26	10	14	0	0	56	-		
Andy Boothroyd	2007-02-25	2007-06-17	11	1	0	0	4	-		
Owen Lewis	2007-03-04	2007-04-21	2	0	0	0	0	-		
Terry Martin	2007-03-10	2008-09-28	31	4	0	0	16	-		
Tom Burnell	2007-03-10	2008-02-10	3	0	0	0	0	-		
Chris Vitalini	2007-03-10	2008-02-10	4	0	0	0	0	Italy, Wales		
Aurélien Cologni	2007-07-15	2007-08-26	5	1	0	0	4	France		
Josh Hannay	2007-08-18	2009-08-16	44	11	30	0	104	Queensland		
Luke Dyer	2008-02-01	2010-09-11	66	26	0	0	104	Wales		
Ian Webster	2008-02-01	2008-09-28	29	7	1	0	30	Wales		
David Tangata-Toa	2008-02-01	2009-09-13	46	8	0	0	32	-		
Aaron Summers	2008-02-01	2008-09-28	25	2	0	0	8	Wales		
Jordan James	2008-02-01	2011-09-04	80	17	0	0	68	Wales		
Ben Flower	2008-02-10	2011-09-09	66	7	0	0	28	Wales		
Philippe Gardent	2008-02-10	2008-08-02	6	0	0	0	0	-		
Mark Lennon	2008-02-16	2009-09-13	40	9	104	1	245	Wales		
Rodney Peake	2008-02-16	2008-02-16	1	0	0	0	0	-		
Matty Smith	2009-02-06	2009-09-13	16	3	2	1	17	England		
Ryan O'Hara	2009-02-06	2011-08-21	79	6	0	0	24	New South Wales, NSW Country		
Mark Bryant	2009-02-06	2011-09-09	80	1	0	0	4	-		
Adam Peek	2009-02-06	2011-03-04	45	4	0	0	16	-		
Peter Lupton	2009-02-06	2011-09-09	70	16	0	0	64	Wales, United States		
Jason Chan	2009-02-14	2011-09-09	75	15	0	0	60	Papua New Guinea		
Marshall Chalk	2009-02-21	2009-08-22	14	4	0	0	16	-		
Lincoln Withers	2009-03-07	2011-09-09	71	10	0	0	40	-		
Steve Tyrer	2009-04-03	2009-09-13	9	2	5	0	18	-		
Lloyd White	2009-06-26	2011-09-09	32	11	0	0	44	Wales		
Lewis Mills	2009-08-16	2009-09-13	4	0	0	0	0	Wales		
Elliot Kear	2009-08-22	2011-09-09	22	5	0	0	20	Wales		
Gil Dudson	2009-08-22	2011-08-12	13	0	0	0	0	Wales		
Ashley Bateman	2009-09-13	2009-09-13	1	0	0	0	0	Wales		
Nick Youngquest	2010-01-29	2010-09-11	29	11	0	0	44	-		
Rocky Trimarchi	2010-01-29	2010-09-11	26	0	0	0	0	Italy		
Vince Mellars	2010-01-29	2011-09-09	48	18	0	0	72	-		
Gareth Raynor	2010-01-29	2010-05-16	7	4	0	0	16	England, Great Britain, Northern Union		
Michael Witt	2010-01-29	2011-08-21	42	13	58	4	172	-		
Tommy Lee	2010-01-29	2010-09-11	12	0	0	0	0	-		
Frank Winterstein	2010-01-29	2011-09-09	48	5	0	0	20	Samoa		
Jamie Thackray	2010-01-29	2010-08-21	19	3	0	0	12	Great Britain		
Weller Hauraki	2010-02-05	2010-09-11	28	11	0	0	44	NZ Māori		
Tony Martin	2010-03-12	2011-09-09	41	14	1	0	58	-		
Gareth Thomas	2010-03-19	2011-07-09	31	7	0	0	28	Wales	(Note: Also a rugby union international for Wales and British & Irish Lions.)	
Clinton Schifcofske	2010-04-05	2011-09-09	47	6	120	0	264	Queensland, Aus PM's XIII		
Rhys Hanbury	2010-04-11	2011-06-03	30	17	0	0	68	-		
Jarrod Sammut	2010-05-01	2011-09-09	35	18	0	0	72	Malta		
Stuart Reardon	2011-02-13	2011-09-09	26	11	0	0	44	Great Britain, England		
Rhys Williams	2011-02-13	2011-05-18	6	3	0	0	12	Wales		
Paul Johnson	2011-02-13	2011-09-09	10	0	0	0	0	England, Great Britain, Lancashire		
Richard Moore	2011-02-13	2011-09-09	22	1	0	0	4	Northern Union		
Jamie Murphy	2011-03-13	1011-03-27	2	0	0	0	0	Wales		
Jordan Tansey	2011-03-27	2011-09-04	18	5	0	0	20	-		
Hep Cahill	2011-04-02	2011-09-04	17	3	0	0	12	-		
Joe Burke	2011-07-09	2011-07-09	1	0	0	0	0	Wales		
Dalton Grant	2011-07-09	2011-07-09	1	0	0	0	0	Wales		
Andy Bracek	2011-09-04	2011-09-09	2	0	0	0	0	Wales		
