= 2010 Crusaders Rugby League season =

Welsh rugby season

- Super League XV Rank: 8th
- Play-off result: Lost in Eliminators
- Challenge Cup: Fifth round

Team information
- Chairman: Geoff Moss
- Head coach: Brian Noble
- Captain: Ryan O'Hara
- Stadium: Racecourse Ground
← 2009	List of seasons	2011 →

Crusaders Rugby League enter their 5th year of rugby league, their 2nd in professional rugby league, in 2010. Additionally, this will be their first known as Crusaders Rugby League after previously being known as Celtic Crusaders, and their first year playing away from Brewery Field, Bridgend, moving to Wrexham's Racecourse Ground. They will be in contention for the Super League, in its 15th season and the 2010 Challenge Cup.

== Season review ==
=== Preseason ===
The preseason saw the Crusaders make a number of changes firstly the Crusaders changed their name from Celtic Crusaders to Crusaders Rugby League then they got rid of previous coach John Dixon and was replaced by Brian Noble as well as gaining Nobles services Iestyn Harris and Jon Sharp joined as assistant coaches. The preseason also saw Wales take part in the 2009 European Cup which they ended up winning against Scotland 28–16, from the Crusaders 2010 Squad Jordan James, Ben Flower, Elliot Kear, Lewis Mills and Lloyd White were all named in the Wales squad. The Crusaders also confirmed Wrexhams Racecourse Ground as their new home ground for 2010 they originally planned to play at Newports Rodney Parade but unfortunately they couldn't which meant they had to move their South Wales base 200 miles to North Wales. The Crusaders made a number of high-profile signings during the off season with players such as former Great Britain internationals Jamie Thackray and Gareth Raynor joining the club as well as former NRL player Michael Witt returning to the 13-man code after a 1 1/2-year stint with the Otago rugby union club.

=== 2010 season ===
In April, Crusaders progressed from the fourth round of the Challenge Cup with a 58–8 win over York City Knights.

== Results ==
=== Super League ===
==== Table ====
Pos	Team	Pld	W	D	L	PF	PA	PD	Pts	Qualification
1	Wigan Warriors (L, C)	27	22	0	5	922	411	+511	44	Play-offs
2	St Helens	27	20	0	7	946	547	+399	40	Play-offs
3	Warrington Wolves	27	20	0	7	885	488	+397	40	Play-offs
4	Leeds Rhinos	27	17	1	9	725	561	+164	35	Play-offs
5	Huddersfield Giants	27	16	1	10	758	439	+319	33	Play-offs
6	Hull F.C.	27	16	0	11	569	584	−15	32	Play-offs
7	Hull Kingston Rovers	27	14	1	12	653	632	+21	29	Play-offs
8	Celtic Crusaders	27	12	0	15	547	732	−185	24	Play-offs
9	Castleford Tigers	27	11	0	16	648	766	−118	22	
10	Bradford Bulls	27	9	1	17	528	728	−200	19	
11	Wakefield Trinity Wildcats	27	9	0	18	539	741	−202	18	
12	Salford City Reds	27	8	0	19	448	857	−409	16	
13	Harlequins	27	7	0	20	494	838	−344	14	
14	Catalans Dragons	27	6	0	21	409	747	−338	12	

Source: Rugby League Project
Rules for classification: 1) Points; 2) Points difference; 3) Number of points scored;
(C) Champions; (L) League Leaders' Shield Winners

==== Super League results ====
W Win D Draw L Loss

Super League results
Date	Round	Versus	H/A	Venue	Result	Score	Tries	Goals	Attendance	Report
29 January	4	Leeds Rhinos	H	Racecourse Ground	L	6–34	Raynor	Witt	10,334	RLP
5 February	1	Wigan Warriors	A	DW Stadium	L	6–38	Dyer	Witt	13,680	RLP
12 February	2	Salford City Reds	A	The Willows	W	36–16	Mellars (3), Raynor, Thackray, Winterstein, Witt	Witt (4)	3,421	RLP
21 February	3	Hull F.C.	H	Racecourse Ground	W	18–16	Youngquest (2), Witt	Witt (3)	6,794	RLP
7 March	5	Warrington Wolves	A	Halliwell Jones Stadium	L	12–46	Bryant, Withers	Witt (2)	11,113	RLP
12 March	6	St Helens	A	The GPW Recruitment Stadium	L	30–37	Dyer, Mellars, Raynor, Thackray, Withers	Witt (5}	8,507	RLP
19 March	7	Catalans Dragons	H	Racecourse Ground	W	14–6	Chan, Lupton	Witt (3)	6,124	RLP
26 March	8	Castleford Tigers	A	The Jungle	L	16–22	Chan, Lupton	Witt (3)	5,229	RLP
5 April	10	Bradford Bulls	A	Grattan Stadium, Odsal	L	16–20	Hauraki, Mellars	Witt (4)	7,853	RLP
11 April	11	Wakefield Trinity Wildcats	A	Hearwell Stadium	W	20–10	Mellars, Thomas, Witt, Youngquest	Witt (2)	4,671	RLP
25 April	12	Huddersfield Giants	H	Racecourse Ground	L	10–38	Dyer, Hauraki	Witt	4,127	RLP
1 May	13	Bradford Bulls	N	Murrayfield Stadium	W	19–0	Witt (3), Sammut	Witt (3 + FG)	26,642	RLP
16 May	14	Hull Kingston Rovers	A	"New" Craven Park	L	10–54	Raynor, Sammut	Witt	7,273	RLP
22 May	15	Wigan Warriors	H	Racecourse Ground	L	26–46	Chan, Hanbury, Lupton, Witt, Youngquest	Witt (3)	6,075	RLP
6 June	16	Harlequins	A	Twickenham Stoop	L	22–50	Chan, Hanbury, Lupton, Schifcofske	Schifcofske (3)	2,381	RLP
13 June	17	Bradford Bulls	H	Racecourse Ground	W	44–20	Hauraki (2), Martin, Mellars, Thomas, Withers, Youngquest	Schifcofske (8)	2,979	RLP
20 June	18	Leeds Rhinos	A	Headingley Carnegie Stadium	W	32–26	Hauraki (2), Mellars (2), Peek	Schifcofske (6)	14,371	RLP
27 June	19	Wakefield Trinity Wildcats	H	Racecourse Ground	L	0–41			2,837	RLP
4 July	20	Warrington Wolves	H	Racecourse Ground	L	10–30	Hanbury, Youngquest	Schifcofske	5,197	RLP
11 July	21	Huddersfield Giants	A	Galpharm Stadium	L	12–30	Hauraki, Sammut	Schifcofske (2)	5,339	RLP
17 July	22	Catalans Dragons	A	Stade Gilbert Brutus	W	26–22	Chan, Hanbury, Hauraki, Lupton	Schifcofske (5)	6,208	RLP
25 July	23	Castleford Tigers	H	The Gnoll	W	30–24	Hanbury, Hauraki, James, Martin, Sammut	Schifcofske (5)	1,495	RLP
1 August	24	Salford City Reds	H	Racecourse Ground	W	60–16	Youngquest (3), Martin (2), Schifcofske (2), Hanbury, Hauraki, O'Hara, Winterstein	Schifcofske (8)	2,412	RLP
6 August	9	Harlequins	H	Racecourse Ground	W	16–12	Hanbury (2), Chan	Schifcofske (2)	1,122	RLP
13 August	25	Hull F.C.	A	KC Stadium	L	16–18	Dyer, Lupton	Schifcofske (4)	11,762	RLP
21 August	26	St Helens	A	Racecourse Ground	L	10–36	Mellars, Winterstein	Schifcofske	5,374	RLP
4 September	27	Hull Kingston Rovers	H	Racecourse Ground	W	30–24	Dyer, Hanbury, Martin, O'Hara, Sammut	Schifcofske (5)	5,137	RLP

==== Play-offs ====
Play-off results
Date	Round	Versus	H/A	Venue	Result	Score	Tries	Goals	Attendance	Report
11 September	Eliminators	Huddersfield Giants	A	Galpharm Stadium	L	12–18	Hanbury	Schifcofske (4)	5,869	RLP

=== Challenge Cup ===
W Win L Loss

Challenge Cup results
Date	Round	Versus	H/A	Venue	Result	Score	Tries	Goals	Attendance	Report
18 April	4	York City Knights	A	Huntington Stadium	W	58–8	Chan (2), Hanbury (2), White (2), Flower, Thackray, Thomas, Youngquest	Witt (9)	719	RLP
9 May	5	Catalans Dragons	H	Racecourse Ground	L	34–35	Lupton, Mellars, Sammut, Schifcofske, Winterstein, Youngquest	Schifcofske (3), Witt (2)	1,817	RLP

== Players ==
=== Squad ===
2010 Crusaders RL season
First team squad			Coaching staff
1 Gareth Thomas – FB, WG; 2 Nick Youngquest – WG; 3 Tony Martin – CE; 4 Vince Mellars – CE; 5 Raynor; 6 Michael Witt – SO, SH; 7 Jarrod Sammut – SH; 8 Ryan O'Hara (c) – PR; 9 Lincoln Withers – HK, SH; 10 Mark Bryant – PR; 11 Weller Hauraki – SR; 12 Jason Chan – SR; 13 Rocky Trimarchi – LF	14 Luke Dyer – CE; 15 Tommy Lee – HK; 16 Frank Winterstein – SR; 17 Adam Peek – PR; 18 Jamie Thackray – PR; 19 Jordan James – PR; 20 Ben Flower – SR; 21 Lloyd White – SO; 22 Elliot Kear – FB; 23 Peter Lupton – SO, LF; 24 Anthony Blackwood – WG; 25 Lewis Mills – PR; 26 Clinton Schifcofske – FB	27 Rhys Hanbury – SH, FB; 28 Gil Dudson – PR; 29; 30 Lee Williams – CE	Head coach: Brian Noble; Assistant coaches: Jon Sharp; Iestyn Harris; Source: Legend: (c) Captain(s); (vc) Vice-captain(s)

=== Transfers ===
==== Gains ====
Acquisitions
Player	Signed from	When signed
Michael Witt	Otago Highlanders	December 2009
Nick Youngquest	Gateshead Thunder	December 2009
Frank Winterstein	Wakefield Trinity Wildcats	December 2009
Tony Martin	Wakefield Trinity Wildcats	December 2009
Vincent Mellars	Auckland Vulcans	January 2010
Tommy Lee	Hull F.C.	November 2009
Jamie Thackray	Hull F.C.	January 2010
Weller Hauraki	Parramatta Eels	January/February 2010
Rhys Hanbury	Wests Tigers	March 2010
Rocky Trimarchi	Wests Tigers	January 2010
Gareth Thomas	Cardiff Blues	March 2010
Clinton Schifcofske	Ulster Rugby	March 2010
Jarrod Sammut	Penrith Panthers	April 2010

==== Losses ====
Losses
Player	Signed for	When left
Tony Duggan	Lézignan Sangliers	August 2009
Josh Hannay	Mackay Cutters	August 2009
Mark Dalle Cort	Northern Pride	August 2009
Jace Van Dijk	Easts Tigers	August 2009
Darren Mapp	Central Comets	August 2009
Marshall Chalk	Gold Coast Titans	November 2009
Matty Smith	St Helens R.F.C. (loan return)	November 2009
Ste Tyrer	St Helens R.F.C. (loan return)	November 2009
Mark Lennon	Burleigh Bears	November 2009
Damien Quinn	Lézignan Sangliers	August 2009
David Tangata-Toa	Unknown	Unknown
Geraint Davies	Coventry RUFC	December 2009
Ashley Bateman	South Wales Scorpions	January 2010
Chris Beasley	Central Comets	November 2009
Aled James	Unknown	Unknown
Neil Budworth	Mackay Cutters	December 2009
Paul Ballard	Blackpool Panthers	December 2009
Terry Martin	Unknown	Unknown
