= 2006 Celtic Crusaders season =

Welsh rugby season

- National League Two Rank: 3rd
- Play-off result: Final Eliminator
- Challenge Cup: Round Four
- National League Cup: Quarter Final Qualifying Round
- 2006 record: Wins: 14; draws: 1; losses: 7
- Points scored: For: 730; against: 387

Team information
- Coach: John Dixon
- Stadium: Brewery Field
- Avg. attendance: 671 (Excluding Challenge Cup)
- High attendance: 1,421 (vs. London Skolars, 5 March)
- Low attendance: 263 (vs. St Albans, 26 March)
← Did Not Exist	2007 →

This article is about the 2006 season of the Crusaders in the National League Two, Challenge Cup & Northern Rail Cup competitions.

== Squad ==
Player	D.O.B.	Appearances	Tries	Goals	F Goals	Points
Ryan Barton	18/2/85	28	4	0	0	12
Chris Beasley	17/10/83	9	2	0	0	8
Steve Brown	15/10/82	1	0	0	0	0
Phil Cushion	15/6/78	26	1	0	0	4
Geraint Davies	7/3/86	29	6	0	0	24
Hywel Davies	19/12/81	23	4	0	0	16
Carl De Chenu	18/6/82	29	21	0	0	84
Gareth Dean	31/3/81	13	1	0	0	4
Neil Dixon	27/11/80	3	5	0	0	20
Tony Duggan	29/8/78	27	37	0	0	148
Carle Ellis	23/7/80	11	0	0	0	0
Kevin Ellis	29/5/65	3	1	0	0	4
Grant Epton	5/1/82	12	6	0	0	24
Dean Fitzgerald	20/12/81	21	5	0	0	20
Matt Hill	25/6/81	10	6	0	0	24
Karl Hocking	9/6/75	15	9	0	0	36
Michael Hook	14/12/82	8	1	6	0	16
Aled James	17/2/82	12	3	0	0	12
Gareth James	24/6/82	1	0	0	0	0
Matt Jobson	1/10/80	13	8	0	0	32
Richard Johnston	26/2/80	12	2	13	0	34
Lee Jones	10/11/78	5	0	0	0	0
Andy Llewellyn	31/8/80	5	0	0	0	0
Paul Morgan	3/10/74	30	16	0	0	64
Lloyd O'Connor	1/12/86	5	3	0	0	12
Scott O'Kelly	2/11/77	6	2	0	0	8
Gareth Price	28/6/80	8	0	0	0	0
Damien Quinn	24/8/81	30	18	85	0	242
Darren Ryan	10/9/81	1	0	0	0	0
Michael Ryan	9/5/81	24	21	0	0	84
Marcus Sainsbury	25/1/78	4	3	0	0	12
Dean Scully	26/1/83	18	0	0	0	0
Anthony Seibold	3/10/74	12	4	0	0	16
David Simm	19/8/84	15	2	0	0	8
Jace Van Dijk	25/2/81	26	9	52	0	140
Shawn van Rensburg	11/10/74	12	0	0	0	0
Lee Williams	9/2/88	3	2	0	0	8
Lenny Woodard	2/4/76	10	4	0	0	16
Neale Wyatt	2/2/81	8	2	0	0	8
Luke Young	31/8/80	30	13	14	0	80

== Results ==
LEGEND
Win
Draw
Loss

League results

Date	Vrs	H/A	Result	Score	HT	Tries	Goals	Field goals	Att	Lineup	Subs	
9/4/06	Workington	A	Won	18-50	6-28	Quinn (2), Young (16), Duggan (23,39,78), M. Ryan (33), Epton (57), Barton (60), De Chenu (63)	Quinn 7/9	N/A	744	Tony Duggan, Carl De Chunu, Geraint Davies, Grant Epton, Paul Morgan, Luke Young, Jace Van Dijk, Ryan Barton, Michael Ryan, Phil Cushion, Karl Hocking, Damien Quinn, Dean Fitzgerald	David Simm (Not Used), Dean Scully, Shawn Van Rensburg, Anthony Seibold	-
17/4/06	Sheffield	A	Lost	22-20	8-8	Seibold (30), De Chunu (38), Morgan (43), M. Ryan (59)	Quinn 2/4	N/A	981	Tony Duggan, Grant Epton, Carl De Chunu, Dean Fitzgerald, Richard Johnston, Luke Young, Jace Van Dijk, Ryan Barton, Michael Ryan, Phil Cushion, Karl Hocking, Damien Quinn, Anthony Seibold	David Simm, Dean Scully, Shawn Van Rensburg, Paul Morgan	-
30/4/06	Barrow	A	Lost	32-16	20-0	Duggan (57), Morgan (70), Simm (79)	Quinn 2/3	N/A	979	Tony Duggan, Lenny Woodard, Dean Scully, Geraint Davies, Paul Morgan, Luke Young, Damien Quinn, Ryan Barton, Michael Hook, Phil Cushion, Karl Hocking, Shawn Van Rensburg, David Simm	Kevin Ellis, Hywel Davies, Matt Jobson, Anthony Seibold	-
7/5/06	Hunslet	H	Won	36-18	30-6	Jobson (1), Young (6), M. Ryan (8,50), Hocking (24), Duggan (38)	Quinn 6/6	N/A	415 (at Talbot Athletic Ground	Michael Hook, Carl De Chunu, Dean Fitzgerald, Damien Quinn, Paul Morgan, Luke Young, Tony Duggan, Ryan Barton, Michael Ryan, Phil Cushion, Shawn Van Rensburg, Matt Jobson, Geraint Davies	Karl Hocking, Steve Brown, Hywel Davies, Anthony Seibold	-
14/5/06	Keighley	A	Drawn	30-30	12-22	De Chenu (2,58), Duggan (8), Jobson (23), Seibold (30), M. Ryan (50)	Quinn 3/6	N/A	754	Michael Hook, Carl De Chenu, Dean Fitzgerald, Damien Quinn, Paul Morgan, Luke Young, Tony Duggan, Ryan Barton, Michael Ryan, Phil Cushion, Shawn Van Rensburg, Matt Jobson, Geraint Davies	David Simm, Dean Scully, Hywel Davies, Anthony Seibold	-
21/5/06	Blackpool	H	Won	52-16	28-12	Jobson (2,25), De Chenu (18), Young (27), M. Ryan (35,45), Duggan (49,55), Hook (58)	Quinn 8/9	N/A	323	Tony Duggan, Carl De Chenu, Dean Fitzgerald, Damien Quinn, Richard Johnston, Luke Young, Jace Van Dijk, Ryan Barton, Michael Ryan, Karl Hocking, David Simm, Matt Jobson, Geraint Davies	Carle Ellis, Dean Scully, Hywel Davies, Michael Hook	-
28/5/06	Dewsbury	A	Lost	42-4	18-0	H. Davies (62)	Quinn 0/1	N/A	967	Tony Duggan, Carl De Chenu, Dean Fitzgerald, Damien Quinn, Paul Morgan, Luke Young, Jace Van Dijk, Ryan Barton, Michael Ryan, Hywel Davies, Shawn Van Rensburg, Matt Jobson, Geraint Davies	Dean Scully, David Simm, Karl Hocking, Michael Hook	-
4/6/06	Keighley	H	Won	58-18	36-0	Jobson (4,18,62), Van Dijk (20), Morgan (24,75), Barton (25,41), Duggan (34,52), Quinn (46)	Quinn 7/11	N/A	600 (at Old Parish, Maesteg)	Richard Johnston, Car De Chenu, Geraint Davies, Damien Quinn, Paul Morgan, Luke Young, Jace Van Dijk, Hywel Davies, Tony Duggan, Phil Cushion, Shawn Van Rensburg, Matt Jobson, Ryan Barton	Lee Jones, Carle Ellis, Karl Hocking, Michael Hook	-
11/6/06	Swinton	A	Won	18-50	12-28	Cushion (1), Jobson (12), Duggan (19,29), Quinn (40,54), H. Davies (45), De Chenu (66,80)	Quinn 7/9	N/A	482	Richard Johnston, Carl De Chenu, Aled James, Damien Quinn, Paul Morgan, Luke Young, Jace Van Dijk, Hywel Davies, Tony Duggan, Phil Cushion, Dean Fitzgerald, Matt Jobson, Ryan Barton	Lee Jones, Geraint Davies, Shawn Van Rensburg, Michael Hook	-
18/6/06	Sheffield	H	Won	28-12	6-6	Duggan (36), Young (42), A. James (62), Dean (77), Morgan (79)	Quinn 4/5	N/A	931	Tony Duggan, Carl De Chenu, Aled James, Damien Quinn, Richard Johnston, Luke Young, Jace Van Dijk, Hywel Davies, Michael Ryan, Phil Cushion, Ryan Barton, Matt Jobson, Dean Fitzgerald	Gareth Dean, Geraint Davies, Shawn Van Rensburg, Paul Morgan	-
25/6/06	London Skolars	A	Won	4-48	0-26	Dixon (13,60), Morgan (21,24), Quinn (32,64), Van Dijk (36), Young (57), M. Ryan (71)	Quinn 6/9	N/A	233	Neil Dixon, Carl De Chenu, Aled James, Damien Quinn, Paul Morgan, Luke Young, Jace Van Dijk, Hywel Davies, Michael Ryan, Shawn Van Rensburg, Ryan Barton, Matt Jobson, Dave Fitzgerald	Gareth Dean, Geraint Davies, Phil Cushion, Scott O'Kelly	-
2/7/06	Swinton	H	Lost	10-21	6-8	Young (37), Dixon (75)	Quinn 1/2	N/A	1,059	Richard Johnston, Carl De Chenu, Neil Dixon, Damien Quinn, Paul Morgan, Luke Young, Jace Van Dijk, Hywel Davies, Michael Ryan, Phil Cushion, Ryan Barton, Aled James, Dean Fitzgerald	Gareth Dean, Geraint Davies, Lee Jones (Not Used), Dean Scully	-
9/7/06	Hunslet	A	Won	12-34	6-4	Quinn (18,46), Young (49), M. Ryan (55), Duggan (66), Van Dijk (78)	Quinn 7/8	N/A	388	Tony Duggan, Carl De Chenu, Richard Johnston, Damien Quinn, Paul Morgan, Luke Young, Jace Van Dijk, Hywel Davies, Michael Ryan, Phil Cushion, Ryan Barton, Aled James, Gareth Dean	Lee Jones, Geraint Davies, Karl Hocking, Dean Scully	-
9/7/06	Barrow	H	Won	42-12	20-6	M. Ryan (13), Duggan (24,46,74), Morgan (38), A. James (41), Quinn (63)	Van Dijk 7/8	N/A	650	Tony Duggan, Richard Johnston, Aled James, Damien Quinn, Paul Morgan, Luke Young, Jace Van Dijk, Hywel Davies, Michael Ryan, Phil Cushion, Gareth Dean, Matt Jobson, Matt Hill	Lee Jones, Geraint Davies, Karl Hocking, Carl De Chenu	-
23/7/06	Blackpool	A	Won	0-52	0-28	De Chenu (5,65,79), M. Ryan (13), Young (15), Hill (17), Quinn (37), Duggan (70), Van Dijk (75)	Van Dijk 7/8	N/A	291	Tony Duggan, Carl De Chenu, Aled James, Damien Quinn, Paul Morgan, Luke Young, Jace Van Dijk, Gareth Dean, Michael Ryan, Phil Cushion, Dean Fitzgerald, Matt Jobson, Matt Hill	Neale Wyatt, Geraint Davies, Chris Beasley, Grant Epton	-
30/7/06	Dewsbury	H	Lost	18-38	6-10	Van Dijk (13), H. Davies (48), M. Ryan (55)	Van Dijk 3/3	N/A	1,103	Tony Duggan, Carl De Chenu, Aled James, Damien Quinn, Paul Morgan, Luke Young, Jace Van Dijk, Hywel Davies, Michael Ryan, Phil Cushion, Gareth Dean, Matt Hill, Neale Wyatt	Chris Beasley, Geraint Davies, Gareth Price, Dean Fitzgerald	-
6/8/06	Gateshead	H	Lost	22-26	12-20	Van Dijk (4), Duggan (26), M. Ryan (59), Hill (62)	Van Dijk 3/4	N/A	595	Tony Duggan, Carl De Chenu, Aled James, Damien Quinn, Paul Morgan, Luke Young, Jace Van Dijk, Hywel Davies, Michael Ryan, Phil Cushion, Dean Fitzgerald, Chris Beasley, Matt Hill	Lee Jones, Ryan Barton, Gareth Price, Geraint Davies	-
13/8/06	Featherstone	A	Lost	11-10	8-6	Morgan (15), M. Ryan (56)	Van Dijk 1/3	N/A	831	Tony Duggan, Grant Epton, Matt Hill, Damien Quinn, Paul Morgan, Luke Young, Jace Van Dijk, Hywel Davies, Michael Ryan, Gareth Price, Ryan Barton, Chris Beasley, Neale Wyatt	Dean Fitzgerald, Geraint Davies, Gareth Dean, Anthony Seibold	-
20/8/06	Workington	H	Won	38-10	20-12	Young (2), Wyatt (20), Quinn (29), Seibold (39,47), Duggan (43,68)	Van Dijk 5/7	N/A	434	Tony Duggan, Carl De Chenu, Matt Hill, Damien Quinn, Grant Epton, Luke Young, Jace Van Dijk, Hywel Davies, Michael Ryan, Gareth Price, Ryan Barton, Chris Beasley, Neale Wyatt	Geraint Davies, Phil Cushion, Gareth Dean, Anthony Seibold	-
3/9/06	Gateshead	A	Won	16-28	4-20	Duggan (9,25), Epton (21), Beasley (34), G. Davies (47)	Van Dijk 4/6	N/A	284	Tony Duggan, Grant Epton, Matt Hill, Damien Quinn, Carl De Chenu, Luke Young, Jace Van Dijk, Hywel Davies, Chris Beasley, Gareth Price, Ryan Barton, Neale Wyatt, Gareth Dean	Paul Morgan, Geraint Davies, Phil Cushion, Anthony Seibold	-
10/9/06	Featherstone	H	Won	14-11	4-3	Wyatt (27). A. James (79), Duggan (80)	Van Dijk 1/3	N/A	720	Tony Duggan, Grant Epton, Matt Hill, Aled James, Carl De Chenu, Luke Young, Jace Van Dijk, Hywel Davies, Michael Ryan, Gareth Dean, Ryan Barton, Chris Beasley. Neale Wyatt	Paul Morgan, Phil Cushion, Gareth Price, Anthony Seibold	-

Play-Off Results

Date	Rd	Vrs	H/A	Result	Score	HT	After 80 Mins	Tries	Goals	Field goals	Att	Lineup	Subs
22/9/06	Sheffield	H	Lost	26-16	6-6	N/A	Hill (27,68), Quinn (79)	Van Dijk 2/5	N/A	760	Tony Duggan, Grant Epton, Aled James, Damien Quinn, Matt Hill, Luke Young, Jace Van Dijk, Gareth Dean, Michael Ryan, Gareth Price, Ryan Barton, Chris Beasley, Neale Wyatt	Paul Morgan, Geraint Davies, Hywel Davies, Anthony Seibold	-
1/10/06	Swinton	H	Lost	26-27 (after golden point extra time)	10-10	26-26	Hill (13,62), Beasley (25), M. Ryan (41), Duggan (52)	Van Dijk 3/6	N/A	687	Tony Duggan, Grant Epton, Aled James, Damien Quinn, Matt Hill, Luke Young, Jace Van Dijk, Gareth Dean, Michael Ryan, Gareth Price, Ryan Barton, Chris Beasley, Neale Wyatt	Paul Morgan, Geraint Davies, Hywell Davies, Anthony Seibold	-

Northern Rail Cup results

Date	Rd	Vrs	H/A	Result	Score	HT	Tries	Goals	Field goals	Att	Lineup	Subs	
12/2/06	Group 1	Hemel Hempstead	A	Won	10-50	10-16	Duggan (2), O'Kelly (9), Quinn (40), O'Connor (48), Simm (61), Morgan (72), Van Dijk (74), H. Davies (76), De Chenu (80)	Van Dijk 6/8, Quinn 1/1	N/A	N/A	Tony Duggan, Carl De Chenu, Geraint Davies, Damien Quinn, Paul Morgan, Luke Young, Jace Van Dijk, Ryan Barton, Scott O'Kelly, Hywel Davies, Carle Ellis, Phil Cushion, Matt Jobson	Lloyd O'Connor, Dean Scully, David Simm, Andy Llewellyn	-
19/2/06	Group 1	London Skolars	A	Won	6-40	0-18	G. Davies (1), Quinn (23), M. Ryan (32,79), Duggan (45), Woodard (53), Fitzgerald (65)	Quinn 6/7	N/A	347	Tony Duggan, Carl De Chenu, Geraint Davies, Dean Fitzgerald, Paul Morgan, Luke Young, Jace Van Dijk, Ryan Barton, Michael Ryan, Hywel Davies, Phil Cushion, Damien Quinn, David Simm	Carle Ellis, Dean Scully, Lenny Woodard, Scott O'Kelly	-
26/2/06	Group 1	St Albans	A	Won	0-72	0-24	Quinn (13,50), De Chenu (25), Fitzgerald (31,77), Woodard (39), Sainsbury (44,57), M. Ryan (51), Morgan (60,75), Epton (69)	Quinn 12/12	N/A	N/A	Grant Epton, Carl De Chenu, Geraint Davies, Lenny Woodard, Paul Morgan, Damien Quinn, Luke Young, Hywel Davies, Michael Ryan, Karl Hocking, Dean Scully, David Simm, Dean Fitzgerald	Andy Llewellyn, Marcus Sainsbury, Carle Ellis, Lloyd O'Connor	-
5/3/06	Group 1	London Skolars	H	Won	78-14	44-10	Young (7,14), Morgan (10,60,76), De Chenu (25), Duggan (27,65), Hocking (32,41), Van Dijk (37), M. Ryan (40), Fitzgerald (51), Quinn (70)	Van Dijk 7/9, Young 4/5	N/A	1,421	Tony Duggan, Carl De Chenu, Geraint Davies, Damien Quinn, Paul Morgan, Luke Young, Jace Van Dijk, Ryan Barton, Michael Ryan, Phil Cushion, David Simm, Matt Jobson, Dean Fitzgerald	Carle Ellis, Dean Scully, Karl Hocking, Lenny Woodard	-
19/3/06	Group 1	Hemel Hempstead	H	Won	72-14	36-0	Barton (8), Morgan (27), K. Ellis (31), Hocking (34,48,73), Epton (37), G. Davies (43,53,72), De Chenu (55), O'Connor (66), O'Kelly (70)	Johnston 10/13	N/A	476	Carl De Chenu, Grant Epton, Geraint Davies, Lenny Woodard, Paul Morgan, Richard Johnston, Kevin Ellis, Ryan Barton, Scott O'Kelly, Phil Cushion, Gareth James, Dean Scully, David Simm	Andy Llewellyn, Marcus Sainsbury, Karl Hocking, Lloyd O'Connor	-
26/3/06	Group 1	St Albans	H	Won	62-0	40-0	De Chenu (1), Johnston (3,32), Dixon (22,36), Hocking (26), Epton (30,44), G. Davies (41), Fitzgerald (49), Williams (78)	Hook 6/7, Johnston 3/4	N/A	263	Richard Johnston, Carl De Chenu, Neil Dixon, Lenny Woodard, Grant Epton, Michael Hook, Kevin Ellis, Andy Llewellyn, Scott O'Kelly, Karl Hocking, Dean Scully, Geraint Davies, David Simm	Dean Fitzgerald, Marcus Sainsbury, Carle Ellis, Lee Williams	-
23/4/06	QF Qualifying Round	Rochdale	H	Lost	6-34	6-18	Young (36)	Quinn 1/1	N/A	480	Richard Johnston, Carl De Chenu, Dean Scully, Lenny Woodard, Paul Morgan, Luke Young, Damien Quinn, Ryan Barton, Jace Van Dijk, Phil Cushion, Karl Hocking, Shawn Van Rensburg, David Simm	Darren Ryan, Carle Ellis, Anthony Seibold, Liam Gadd (Not Used)	-

Group 1
Team	Pld	W	D	L	PF	PA	PD	Pts
Celtic Crusaders	6	6	0	0	374	44	+330	12
London Skolars	6	4	0	2	182	170	+12	8
St Albans	6	2	0	4	56	248	−192	4
Hemel Hempstead	6	0	0	6	60	210	−150	0

Challenge Cup results

Date	Rd	Vrs	H/A	Result	Score	HT	Tries	Goals	Field goals	Att	Lineup	Subs	
12/3/06	Rd 4	RC Lokomotiv Moscow	H	Won	64-4	30-4	Duggan (2,32,40,48), Young (20), De Chenu (28,53), Woodard (60), Sainsbury (64), Williams (69), O'Connor (78)	Young 10/11	N/A	623	Carl De Chenu, Lee Williams, Lenny Woodard, Geraint Davies, Paul Morgan, Luke Young, Tony Duggan, Ryan Barton, Lloyd O'Connor, Phil Cushion, David Simm, Damien Quinn, Dean Fitzgerald	Carle Ellis, Dean Scully, Marcus Sainsbury, Scott O'Kelly	-
1/4/06	Rd 5	Rochdale	A	Lost	32-8	20-0	M. Ryan (43), Duggan (71)	Young 0/2	N/A	666	Tony Duggan, Carl De Chenu, Lenny Woodard, Damien Quinn, Paul Morgan, Luke Young, Jace Van Dijk, Ryan Barton, Michael Ryan, Phil Cushion, Dean Scully, David Simm, Dean Fitzgerald	Carle Ellis, Geraint Davies, Lloyd O'Connor, Lee Williams	-

== Statistics ==
Tries

#	Name	Tries
1	Tony Duggan	37
2	Carl De Chenu	22
3	Michael Ryan	20
4	Damien Quinn	18
4	Paul Morgan	16

Goals

#	Name	Goals
1	Damien Quinn	85
2	Jace Van Dijk	52
3	Luke Young	14
4	Richard Johnston	13
5	Michael Hook	6

Points

#	Name	Points
1	Damien Quinn	242
2	Tony Duggan	148
3	Jace Van Dijk	140
4	Carl De Chenu	88
5	Luke Young	80

Appearances

#	Name	Appearances
1	Damien Quinn	30
2	Luke Young	30
3	Paul Morgan	30
4	Geraint Davies	29
5	Carl De Chenu	29
