= 2009 Celtic Crusaders season =

Welsh rugby season

The Crusaders made their début season in the Super League in 2009, in their fifth year of existence. They also competed for the 2009 Challenge Cup.

== Transfers ==
Transfers for 2009 (in)

Name	Transferred from	Date released
Ryan O'Hara	Wests Tigers	October 2008
Lincoln Withers	Canberra Raiders	October 2008
Mark Bryant	Manly Sea Eagles	October 2008
Adam Peek	Cronulla Sharks	October 2008
Marshall Chalk	Canberra Raiders	October 2008
Matty Smith	Widnes Vikings	October 2008
Peter Lupton	Castleford Tigers	October 2008
Ste Tyrer	Widnes Vikings	October 2008
Jason Chan	Windsor Wolves (Penrith Panthers)	January 2009

Transfers for 2009 (out)

Name	Date released
Paul Ballard	October 2008
Ian Webster	October 2008
Aaron Summers	October 2008
Neale Wyatt	October 2008
Gareth Dean	October 2008
Tom Burnell	October 2008
Geraint Davies	October 2008
Philippe Gardent	October 2008
Jamie I'Anson	October 2008
Rod Peake	October 2008
Chris Vitalini	October 2008

== 2009 squad ==
No	Player	Position	Previous club
1	Tony Duggan	Full back	Toowoomba Clydesdales
2	Luke Dyer	Wing	Hull Kingston Rovers
3	Josh Hannay	Centre	Cronulla Sharks
4	Mark Dalle Cort	Centre	North Queensland Cowboys
5	Anthony Blackwood	Wing	Halifax
6	Damien Quinn	Stand off	Toowoomba Clydesdales
7	Jace Van Dijk(C)	Scrum half	Wynnum Seagulls
8	Ryan O'Hara	Prop	Wests Tigers
9	Lincoln Withers	Hooker	Canberra Raiders
10	Mark Bryant	Prop	Manly Sea Eagles
11	Adam Peek	Second row	Cronulla Sharks
12	Darren Mapp	Second row	Cronulla Sharks
13	Marshall Chalk	Loose forward	Canberra Raiders
14	Matty Smith	Scrum half	Widnes Vikings
15	Peter Lupton	Utility	Castleford Tigers
16	Ben Flower	Second row	Bedwas
17	Jordan James	Prop	Widnes Vikings
18	Mark Lennon	Wing	Hull Kingston Rovers
19	Jason Chan	Prop	Windsor Wolves (Penrith Panthers)
20	David Tangata-Toa	Prop	Hull Kingston Rovers
21	Chris Beasley	Second row	St Gaudens
22	Steve Tyrer	Centre	Widnes Vikings
23	Neil Budworth	Hooker	Harlequins RL
24	Aled James	Centre	Sheffield Eagles
25	Geraint Davies	Loose forward	Aberavon Fighting Irish
26	Terry Martin	Second row	Canberra Raiders

== Fixtures and results ==
Competition	Round	Opponent	Result	Score	Home/away	Venue	Attendance	Date
Friendly	N/A	Harlequins RL	N/A	A-A	Away	Twickenham Stoop Stadium	N/A	29 January 2009
Super League XIV	3	Leeds Rhinos	Loss	28–6	Away	Headingley Stadium	14,827	6 February 2009
Super League XIV	1	Salford City Reds	Loss	28–16	Away	The Willows	4,026	14 February 2009
Super League XIV	2	Hull	Loss	20–28	Home	Brewery Field	5,272	21 February 2009
Super League XIV	4	St Helens R.F.C.	Loss	0–4	Home	Brewery Field	6,351	7 March 2009
Super League XIV	5	Hull Kingston Rovers	Loss	48–18	Away	New Craven Park	8,046	15 March 2009
Super League XIV	6	Wakefield Trinity Wildcats	N/A	P-P	Home	Brewery Field	N/A	22 March 2009
Super League XIV	7	Warrington Wolves	Loss	27–22	Away	Halliwell Jones Stadium	7,854	29 March 2009
Challenge Cup 2009	4	Hull Kington Rovers	Loss	32–6	Away	New Craven Park	7,104	3 April 2009
Super League XIV	8	Huddersfield Giants	Loss	30–10	Away	Galpharm Stadium	6,407	10 April 2009
Super League XIV	9	Harlequins RL	Loss	18–40	Home	Brewery Field	3,009	13 April 2009
Super League XIV	10	Wigan Warriors	Loss	44–10	Away	JJB Stadium	12,371	19 April 2009
Super League XIV	11	Castleford Tigers	Loss	22–34	Home	Brewery Field	2,857	26 April 2009
Super League XIV	12	Huddersfield Giants	Loss	16–40	Neutral	Murrayfield Stadium	30,122	3 May 2009
Super League XIV	13	Bradford Bulls	Win	24–30	Away	Grattan Stadium	7,602	17 May 2009
Super League XIV	14	Catalans Dragons	Loss	18–30	Home	Brewery Field	2,927	23 May 2009
Super League XIV	6	Wakefield Trinity Wildcats	Loss	6–50	Home	Brewery Field	2,089	30 May 2009
Super League XIV	15	Harlequins RL	Loss	26–6	Away	Twickenham Stoop Stadium	2,245	6 June 2009
Super League XIV	16	Wigan Warriors	Win	22–16	Home	Brewery Field	5,253	13 June 2009
Super League XIV	17	Hull Kingston Rovers	Loss	18–32	Home	Brewery Field	3,015	20 June 2009
Super League XIV	18	St Helens RLFC	Loss	30–0	Away	GPW Recruitment Stadium	8,684	26 June 2009
Super League XIV	19	Warrington Wolves	Loss	6–22	Home	Brewery Field	3,231	4 July 2009
Super League XIV	20	Salford City Reds	Win	25–12	Home	Brewery Field	3,009	11 July 2009
Super League XIV	21	Hull FC	Loss	22–6	Away	KC Stadium	10,397	17 July 2009
Super League XIV	22	Bradford Bulls	Loss	12–34	Home	Brewery Field	3,089	25 July 2009
Super League XIV	23	Catalans Dragons	Loss	34–0	Away	Stade Gilbert Brutus	6,874	1 August 2009
Super League XIV	24	Wakefield Trinity Wildcats	Loss	46–12	Away	Belle Vue	7,893	16 August 2009
Super League XIV	25	Leeds Rhinos	Loss	0–68	Home	Rodney Parade	5,597	22 August 2009
Super League XIV	26	Huddersfield Giants	Loss	16–42	Home	Brewery Field	1,988	5 September 2009
Super League XIV	27	Castleford Tigers	Loss	35–22	Away	The Jungle	6,547	13 September 2009

== League table ==
Pos	Team	Pld	W	D	L	PF	PA	PD	Pts	Qualification
1	Leeds Rhinos (L, C)	27	21	0	6	805	453	+352	42	Play-offs
2	St Helens	27	19	0	8	733	466	+267	38	Play-offs
3	Huddersfield Giants	27	18	0	9	690	416	+274	36	Play-offs
4	Hull Kingston Rovers	27	17	1	9	650	516	+134	35	Play-offs
5	Wakefield Trinity Wildcats	27	16	0	11	685	609	+76	32	Play-offs
6	Wigan Warriors	27	15	0	12	659	551	+108	30	Play-offs
7	Castleford Tigers	27	14	0	13	645	702	−57	28	Play-offs
8	Catalans Dragons	27	13	0	14	613	660	−47	26	Play-offs
9	Bradford Bulls	27	12	1	14	653	668	−15	25	
10	Warrington Wolves	27	12	0	15	649	705	−56	24	
11	Harlequins	27	11	0	16	591	691	−100	22	
12	Hull F.C.	27	10	0	17	502	623	−121	20	
13	Salford City Reds	27	7	0	20	456	754	−298	14	
14	Celtic Crusaders	27	3	0	24	357	874	−517	6	

Source: Rugby League Project
Rules for classification: 1) Points; 2) Points difference; 3) Number of points scored;
(C) Champions; (L) League Leaders' Shield Winners

== Notes ==
a: Game called off due to flooded pitch.
b: Game rearranged to make the Leeds Rhinos available for the 2009 World Club Challenge.
c: Game postponed in respect to the death of Wakefield player, Leon Walker, who received a fatal injury during the reserves' game.
Game rearranged to 30 May 2009.
