= Josh Hannay =

Australian RL coach and former rugby league footballer

Personal information
- Full name: Joshua Hannay
- Born: 11 January 1980 (age 46) Moranbah, Queensland, Australia
- Height: 188 cm (6 ft 2 in)
- Weight: 98 kg (15 st 6 lb)

Playing information
- Position: Centre, Wing, Five-eighth
Club
Years	Team	Pld	T	G	FG	P
1998–06	North Qld Cowboys	150	49	343	0	882
2007	Cronulla Sharks	3	0	0	0	0
2007–09	Celtic Crusaders	44	12	30	0	108
	Total	197	61	373	0	990
Representative
Years	Team	Pld	T	G	FG	P
2003–06	Queensland	2	0	4	0	8

Coaching information
Club
Years	Team	Gms	W	D	L	W%
2020	North Qld Cowboys	9	2	0	8	22
2021	Cronulla Sharks	19	8	0	11	42
2026–	Gold Coast Titans	24	6	0	18	25
	Total	52	16	0	37	31
- Source: As of 4 September 2026

Josh Hannay (born 11 January 1980) is an Australian professional rugby league coach who is the head coach of the Gold Coast Titans in the NRL.

Previously he was an assistant coach of the Cronulla-Sutherland Sharks in the National Rugby League and assistant coach of the Queensland rugby league team. He is also a former professional rugby league footballer who played as a centre in the 1990s and 2000s.

A Queensland State of Origin representative, Hannay spent nine seasons with the North Queensland Cowboys and was the club's highest point scorer until 2011. He later had stints with the Cronulla-Sutherland Sharks and Celtic Crusaders, before moving into coaching.

He served as the interim head coach of the North Queensland Cowboys in 2020 and the Cronulla-Sutherland Sharks in 2021.

== Background ==
Born and raised in Moranbah, Queensland, Hannay played his junior rugby league for the Moranbah Miners before being signed by the North Queensland Cowboys at 15. In Townsville, he attended Townsville Grammar School.

== Playing career ==
=== North Queensland Cowboys ===
In Round 15 of the 1996 ARL season, Cowboys' head coach Graham Lowe named Hannay to make his first grade debut against the Western Suburbs Magpies. At 16 years and 185 days old, Hannay would have been the second youngest player to debut in Australian history after Ray Stehr, who debuted at 16 years and 85 days in 1929. The selection was ultimately blocked by the Australian Rugby League (ARL), as Hannay (who was born in 1980), had to turn 17 the year he debuted to be eligible.

In Round 3 of the 1998 NRL season, almost two years after his vetoed debut, the now 18-year old Hannay made his NRL debut in the Cowboys' 16–15 win over the Parramatta Eels, scoring a try. In Round 23, he scored his first NRL hat-trick in a 12–28 loss to the Manly Warringah Sea Eagles. In his rookie season for the club, he played 21 games, starting at either centre or wing, scoring 15 tries, 29 goals and 118 points to finish as the side's top try and point scorer. In 1999, despite playing just 13 games due to injuries, he represented the Junior Kangaroos alongside his Cowboys teammate Scott Prince.

Over the next two seasons, Hannay was further plagued by injuries, playing only 17 games, including just five in 2000. In 2002, he played his first full season in four years, starting in 19 games for the Cowboys and finishing as their top point scorer.

In 2003, Hannay enjoyed a breakout season, playing 23 games and scoring 230 points, second in the NRL only to Hazem El Masri's 294. On 16 July 2003, he made his State of Origin debut for Queensland, starting at centre and kicking four goals in a 36–6 Game III win over New South Wales at Suncorp Stadium. In Round 23 of the 2003 season, Hannay set the record for most points (24) and most goals (10) in a single game for the Cowboys in their 60–8 win over the South Sydney Rabbitohs. As of 2020, his 10-goal record still stands, while Johnathan Thurston later equalled his points record in 2006.

In 2004, Hannay started at centre in all 27 games for the Cowboys as they qualified for the finals for the first time in their history. He scored 228 points that season, finishing second again in the top point scorers list to El Masri, who scored 342. In 2005, he started at centre in the Cowboys' maiden NRL Grand Final appearance, a 16–30 loss to the Wests Tigers.

In 2006, Hannay fell out of favour at the Cowboys, playing just nine games. In July, he was told by the club he would not be re-signed when his contract ended that season. Despite this, Hannay earned a recall to the Queensland side, starting at centre in their series-deciding 16–14 win over New South Wales at the Telstra Dome in Melbourne. On 26 July 2006, he signed a two-year deal with the Cronulla-Sutherland Sharks.

=== Cronulla-Sutherland Sharks ===
In Round 1 of the 2007 NRL season, Hannay made his debut for the Sharks in an 18–0 win over the Penrith Panthers. He would play just two more games before being dropped to NSW Cup by head coach Ricky Stuart. In June 2007, he was dropped from the Sharks' NSW Cup side and began playing for the Gymea Gorillas in the local Cronulla-Sutherland District competition before being granted a release by the club.

=== Celtic Crusaders ===
In August 2007, Hannay signed the Celtic Crusaders, who were playing in the National League Two, helping them to promotion to the National League One. In 2008, he was a member of the Crusaders' side who lost to Salford City in the National League One Grand Final. Despite losing the Grand Final, the Crusaders finished second and earned promotion to the Super League for the first time. In 2009, he played 17 Super League games for the Crusaders, finishing as the club's top point scorer.

Hannay did not get to finish the season, as he, along with Australian teammates Jace Van Dijk, Tony Duggan, Damien Quin, Darren Mapp and Mark Dalle Cort were deported after the UK Border Agency ruled they breached visa regulations. Hannay was banned from entering the United Kingdom for 10 years and his Crusaders' contract was cancelled with immediate effect.

=== Later career ===
In November 2009, Hannay returned to Australia, joining the Mackay Cutters in the Queensland Cup for the 2010 season.

In 2011, he returned to Moranbah to play for his junior club, the Moranbah Miners, in the Mackay and Districts A-Grade competition. In 2012, he captain-coached the club to premiership success in the competition. In 2013, he retired from playing and solely focused on coaching the Miners.

== Coaching career ==
=== Souths Logan Magpies ===
On 9 October 2013, Hannay was appointed head coach of the Souths Logan Magpies in the Queensland Cup for the 2014 season. Over three seasons with the club, Hannay's highest place finish with the Magpies was 7th in 2016, missing the finals on points differential. He coached 70 games, winning 28, for a 40% winning percentage. In 2016 and 2017, he coached the Queensland under-18 rugby league team, losing both games to New South Wales.

=== North Queensland Cowboys ===
In 2017, he returned to the North Queensland Cowboys as an assistant coach to Paul Green. In his first season on the coaching staff, the Cowboys qualified for the NRL Grand Final, losing to the Melbourne Storm. In 2018, he joined the Queensland coaching staff as an assistant to Kevin Walters, spending just one year in the role.

On 20 July 2020, Hannay was named as the interim head coach of the North Queensland Cowboys following the resignation of Paul Green. In Round 17 of the 2020 NRL season, after five straight losses, Hannay earned his first win as an NRL head coach after the Cowboys defeated the St George Illawarra Dragons 23–22 in golden point. On 22 September 2020, after being overlooked as full-time head coach of the Cowboys, Hannay announced he would leave the club, despite being under contract for the 2021 season.

=== Cronulla-Sutherland Sharks ===
On 17 November 2020, Hannay joined the Cronulla-Sutherland Sharks as an assistant coach. On 14 April 2021 Hannay was named as caretaker head coach following the sacking of John Morris

In round 11 of the 2021 NRL season, he earned his first win as Cronulla-Sutherland interim coach as the club defeated fierce rivals St. George Illawarra 13–12.

Hannay is currently an assistant coach with the Queensland State of Origin Team.

=== Gold Coast Titans ===
On 25 August 2025, the Gold Coast announced that Des Hasler would not be the team coach in 2026 with them announcing that Hannay would take over as head coach from 2026. On 16 October 2025, it was announced that there was a clause in Hannay's contract which stated that if Craig Bellamy was approached by the Gold Coast to become head coach that Hannay would be demoted to assistant head coach. Hannay's reign as Gold Coast head coach got off to the worst possible start as they lost to his former club Cronulla 50-10 in round 1 of the 2026 NRL season. Hannay finished his first season as Gold Coast head coach with the club finishing 16th on the table, the same position they finished in 2025.

== Statistics ==
=== NRL ===
Season	Team	Matches	T	G	GK %	F/G	Pts
1998	North Queensland	21	15	29	50.0	0	118
1999	North Queensland	13	1	3	42.9	0	10
2000	North Queensland	5	0	0	—	0	0
2001	North Queensland	12	3	0	—	0	12
2002	North Queensland	19	3	48	67.6	0	108
2003	North Queensland	23	10	95	79.8	0	230
2004	North Queensland	27	8	98	73.1	0	228
2005	North Queensland	21	7	62	66.0	0	152
2006	North Queensland	9	2	8	—	53.3	24
2007	Cronulla-Sutherland	3	0	0	—	0	0
Career totals		153	49	343	68.9%	0	882

=== Super League ===
Season	Team	Matches	T	G	GK %	F/G	Pts
2009	Celtic Crusaders	17	3	24	–	0	60
Career totals		17	3	24	–	0	60

=== State of Origin ===
†	Denotes seasons in which Hannay won a State of Origin Series

Season	Team	Matches	T	G	GK %	F/G	Pts
2003	Queensland	1	0	4	—	57.1	8
2006†	Queensland	1	0	0	—	0	0
Career totals		2	0	4	—	57.1	8

=== Coaching ===
Josh Hannay – Coaching Results by Season
NRL Team	Year	Games	Wins	Draws	Losses	Win %	Notes
North Queensland	2020	9	2	0	7	22%	Interim role
Cronulla-Sutherland	2021	19	8	0	11	42%	Interim role
Gold Coast Titans	2026						Head Coach
Career		28	10	0	18	36%	
