= Crusaders Rugby =

Crusaders Rugby may refer to:

- Crusaders Rugby League, a Welsh rugby league club.
- Crusaders (rugby union), a New Zealand rugby union team.
- Harlequins RL, an English rugby league club once known as "London Crusaders".
