= Trimarchi =

Trimarchi is a surname. Notable people with the surname include:

- Domenico Trimarchi (born 1938), Italian operatic singer
- Rocky Trimarchi (born 1986), Australian rugby league footballer
