= Crusaders Colts =

Welsh rugby league team

The Crusaders Colts were established as a feeder team for the Celtic Crusaders rugby league team, and participated in the Rugby League Conference National Division in 2008. The side was set up as a joint venture by the Crusaders club and the Wales Rugby League board to allow Welsh players to play a higher level of rugby than the current Welsh Premier division which was made up of all the other Welsh teams across South Wales. The Crusaders Colts were coached by Dan Clements, and won the Conference National in their only season, coming second in the league table by losing just three matches, but eventually winning the Grand Final by beating Bramley Buffaloes 26–4. However, due to the Celtic Crusaders promotion into Super League, the team were disbanded and a new reserve grade side was established solely by the club for the 2009 season. The team played in a striped gold and black shirt, with black shorts and socks. Many of the Colts players went on to represent Wales at various levels, play in the Crusaders first team, or joined the South Wales Scorpions.

== See also ==
- Rugby League in Wales
- Wales Rugby League
- List of rugby league clubs in Britain
