= Shawn van Rensburg =

South African dual-code rugby player

Shawn van Rensburg is a South African dual-code rugby footballer. A flanker, he played club rugby for the Newport Gwent Dragons, before switching codes to play rugby league for the Celtic Crusaders. He made 12 appearances for the Crusaders in the 2006 season.
