= Owen Lewis (rugby league) =

Welsh rugby league footballer

Personal information
- Born: 1 October 1988 (age 37)

Playing information
- Position: Wing
Club
Years	Team	Pld	T	G	FG	P
2007	Celtic Crusaders	2	0	0	0	0

Owen Lewis (born 1 October 1988) is a Welsh rugby league footballer who has gained Under 18 and Under 19 international honours representing Wales and also Great Britain.

Having played for Valley Cougars, he made his début for Celtic Crusaders rugby league team in 2007 and played one further match for them in the same season before leaving the club to study at Loughborough University for whom he played rugby union in National League 2 North.
