= New Bridgend stadium =

Proposed stadium in Bridgend, Wales

New Bridgend Stadium
- Interactive map of New Bridgend Stadium
- Location: Bridgend, Wales
- Capacity: 15,000

New Bridgend Stadium was a proposed stadium in Bridgend, Wales. It was to be a 15,000-seater multi-sports stadium. The plans were put in motion after an application to build a 100,000-seater stadium were rejected in the 1990s.

The driving force behind the proposal was the Crusaders, their Chief Executive David Thompson indicated the stadium would be used for several sports saying, "We hope to go into partnership with Bridgend Ravens, Bridgend County Borough Council, maybe Bridgend Football Club and anyone else who wants to be involved in this project".

It was boosted by the promotion of the Crusaders into the Super League in 2008.

Two "rival" schemes to provide the stadium emerged. The first was a "sports village" at Island Farm by local company HD Limited. It provided a 15,000-seater stadium for Crusaders, and smaller stadia for Bridgend Ravens and Bridgend Town. In addition to this, parkland, an extension to Bridgend Science Park, an indoor sports/training centre, a specialist tennis centre and facilities for other sports such as boxing. An outline application was lodged with Bridgend County Borough Council in September 2009.

The second scheme was at a brownfield site to the north east of the town centre at Brackla. It was being developed by Wigan-based developers Greenbank Partnerships, who developed Leigh Sports Village and Olympian Homes. Their scheme included a stadium, hotel, leisure facilities and retail outlets.

After the Crusaders relocated to Wrexham for Super League XV in 2010, plans for the stadium were shelved. In January 2021, plans were resubmitted for the Island Farm site, with only a tennis centre remaining from the original plans.
