= Matt Jobson =

Australian rugby league footballer

Personal information
- Full name: Matthew Jobson
- Born: 1 October 1980 (age 45) Maitland, New South Wales, Australia

Playing information
- Height: 183 cm (6 ft 0 in)
- Weight: 109 kg (17 st 2 lb)
- Position: Prop, Second-row
Club
Years	Team	Pld	T	G	FG	P
2001–03	Newcastle Knights	25	1	0	0	4
2004	New Zealand Warriors	2	0	0	0	0
2005	Wests Tigers	4	0	0	0	0
2006	Crusaders RL	13	8	0	0	32
2006–07	Toulouse Olympique	1	0	0	0	0
	Total	45	9	0	0	36

Matt Jobson (born 1 October 1980) is an Australian former professional rugby league footballer who played in the 2000s, as a prop.

== Early years ==
Jobson was born in Maitland, New South Wales, Australia.

He was a South Newcastle junior and later joined the Newcastle Knights.

He made his first grade début in 2001, appearing off the interchange bench in Round 15 against the Sydney Roosters. Having won the 2001 NRL Premiership, the Knights traveled to England to play the 2002 World Club Challenge against the Super League champions, the Bradford Bulls. Jobson played from the interchange bench in the Knights' loss. He went on to play in twenty four games for the Knights over the next three years.

== Searching for a Start ==
In 2004 he joined the New Zealand Warriors, hoping for more game time. However he only managed to play two games for the club and instead spent most of the season playing for the Eastern Tornadoes in the Bartercard Cup. For 2005 Jobson joined the Wests Tigers but was again unable to break into the starting line up and played only four games. When not selected in first grade, Jobson played for both the Western Suburbs Magpies and Balmain-Ryde in the NSWRL Premier League.

== Europe ==
Frustrated, Jobson decided to join the Crusaders in National League Two for 2006 and was a part of there inaugural season. However he decided to move again at the end of the year, and joined Toulouse Olympique for the Elite One Championship 2006–07 season.

== Back to Australia ==
He returned to his local club, the South Newcastle Lions, in 2007 after the completion of the French season. In 2008 he joined the Easts Tigers in the Queensland Cup, his tenth club in six years.
