= Craig Richards (rugby) =

Welsh rugby union and rugby league player

Personal information
- Born: 10 October 1978 (age 47) Swansea, Wales

Playing information

Rugby union
Representative
Years	Team	Pld	T	G	FG	P
2002	Wales 7s

Rugby league
- Position: Wing
Club
Years	Team	Pld	T	G	FG	P
2007	Crusaders RL	10	14	0	0	56
2010	South Wales Scorpions	14	5	0	0	20
	Total	24	19	0	0	76

Craig Richards (born 10 October 1978) is a Welsh former rugby league and rugby union sevens player.

== Playing career ==
=== Rugby union ===
Richards represented Wales in rugby sevens at the 2002 Commonwealth Games.

=== Rugby league ===
Richards played for the Crusaders in the National League Two for one season, in 2007. In May 2007, he tested positive to a metabolite of cocaine and was banned from the sport for two years. He returned to rugby league in 2010, playing one season with the South Wales Scorpions in the same competition.
