= Phil Cushion =

Wales international rugby league footballer

Personal information
- Full name: Philip Cushion
- Born: 15 June 1978 (age 47); Wigan, England

Playing information
- Position: Prop
Club
Years	Team	Pld	T	G	FG	P
2001–03	Swinton Lions
2006–07	Celtic Crusaders	47	4			16
2010	South Wales Scorpions
	Total	47	4	0	0	16
Representative
Years	Team	Pld	T	G	FG	P
2007	Wales	1+1

Philip Cushion (born 15 June 1978), also known by the nickname of "Cush", is an English-born former professional rugby league footballer who played in the 2000s. He played at representative level for Wales, and at club level for Swinton Lions, Celtic Crusaders and South Wales Scorpions as a prop.

2nd place Welsh Indoor Rowing Championship 2019 2km hwt 40+ time 6.24. 5

== Background ==
Phil Cushion was born in Wigan, Greater Manchester, England.

== International honours ==
Phil Cushion won caps for Wales while at Celtic Crusaders 2007(…present?) 1-caps + 1-cap (interchange/substitute).
