= Hywel Davies (rugby league) =

Welsh rugby league footballer

Personal information
- Full name: Hywel Davies
- Born: 19 December 1981 (age 44) Bridgend, Wales

Playing information
- Position: Prop
Club
Years	Team	Pld	T	G	FG	P
2003–05	Bridgend Blue Bulls
2006–07	Celtic Crusaders	53	5			20
	Total	53	5	0	0	20
Representative
Years	Team	Pld	T	G	FG	P
2006–07	Wales	1

Hywel Davies (19 December 1981) is a Welsh professional rugby league footballer, and coach. He played at representative level for Wales, and at club level for the Bridgend Blue Bulls and the Celtic Crusaders, as a prop, and coached at club level for the South Wales Scorpions.

== Background ==
Hywel Davies was born in Bridgend, Wales.

== International honours ==
Hywel Davies won a cap for Wales while at Celtic Crusaders 2006(...2007?) 1-cap.
