= Richard Johnston (rugby) =

Wales international rugby league & union footballer

Personal information
- Full name: Richard Johnston
- Born: 26 February 1980 (age 45); Neath, Wales

Playing information

Rugby union
Club
Years	Team	Pld	T	G	FG	P
1998–99	Neath RFC	0	0	0	0	0
2000	Pontypridd RFC	0	0	0	0	0
	Neath RFC	0	0	0	0	0
	Total	0	0	0	0	0

Rugby league
Club
Years	Team	Pld	T	G	FG	P
	Celtic Crusaders	0	0	0	0	0
Representative
Years	Team	Pld	T	G	FG	P
	Wales	4	2	0	0	8
- Source: As of 31 Aug 2021

Richard Johnston (born 26 February 1980 in Neath, Wales) is a former rugby union and rugby league footballer.

Johnston started his career at Neath RFC in 1998 where he gained representative honours for Wales under 18/19s. In 2000 Johnston signed for Pontypridd RFC where he spent three years. In his time at Ponty, Johnston was selected for Wales U21s and Wales 7s and was involved in the squad that won the Welsh Cup in 2002 and narrowly lost to Sale in the Parker Pen European Shield Final. After regional rugby was formed he returned to Neath RFC winning the league twice and Welsh Cup in a three-year stint. Johnston then changed codes, signing for Crusader RL and won 4 caps for Wales. He also played on the 7s circuit playing for Samurai 7s, White Hart Marauders, Crusaders and Scorpions. In 2003, he returned to rugby union, playing for the Llanelli Scarlets in their first season as a regional side; he made two appearances in February 2004. In 2007 Johnston left rugby to pursue a career outside sport but continues to play on the 7s circuit and now vets competitions.
