= Karl Hocking =

Wales international rugby league & union footballer

Personal information
- Full name: Karl Hocking
- Born: 9 June 1975 (age 49); Bridgend, Wales

Playing information
- Height: 6 ft 2 in (188 cm)
- Weight: 18 st 2 lb (115 kg)

Rugby union
- Position: Flanker, Number Eight
Club
Years	Team	Pld	T	G	FG	P
≤2002–02	Tondu RFC
2002–≥02	Bridgend Ravens
2001–≥02	Caerphilly RFC
≤2009–≥09	Bridgend Ravens
	Total	0	0	0	0	0

Rugby league
- Position: Prop
Club
Years	Team	Pld	T	G	FG	P
≤2005–06	Bridgend Blue Bulls
2004	AS Carcassonne
2006–≥06	Celtic Crusaders
	Total	0	0	0	0	0
Representative
Years	Team	Pld	T	G	FG	P
2005–06	Wales	2

Karl Hocking (born 9 June 1975) is a Welsh former professional rugby union and rugby league footballer who played in the 2000s. He played club level rugby union (RU) for Tondu RFC, Bridgend Ravens (two spells), and Caerphilly RFC, as a flanker, or Number Eight, and representative level rugby league (RL) for Wales, and at club level for Bridgend Blue Bulls, in the Elite One Championship for AS Carcassonne (in France), and Celtic Crusaders, as a prop. Karl is the leader try scoring forward in Welsh rugby union league history since leagues began in 1995. He has scored 148 league tries in his rugby union career.

== Background ==
Karl Hocking was born in Bridgend, Wales.

== Playin career ==
=== International honours ===
Karl Hocking won caps for Wales (RL) while at Bridgend Blue Bulls 2005(…2006?) 1(2?)-cap(s) (interchange/substitute).
