= Lewis Mills (rugby league) =

Wales international rugby league footballer

Personal information
- Full name: Lewis Mills
- Born: 30 May 1989 (age 35); Cardiff, Glamorgan, Wales

Playing information
- Position: Prop
Club
Years	Team	Pld	T	G	FG	P
2009	Crusaders	4	0	0	0	0
2010–11	South Wales Scorpions	27	5	0	0	20
	Total	31	5	0	0	20
Representative
Years	Team	Pld	T	G	FG	P
2009–2010	Wales	3	0	0	0	0
- Source: rleague.com As of 26 January 2010

Lewis Mills (born 30 May 1989) is a Wales international rugby league footballer who played for the Crusaders in the Super League. He signed for the Crusaders, then Celtic Crusaders in 2008, after coming through the youth ranks at the Newport Titans. Mills' position of preference is prop. Mills made his Super League début in 2009's Super League XIV, coming off the bench in a round 24 loss away to Wakefield Trinity Wildcats. He played on three more occasions, all of which were substitute appearances. Mills also gained national honours, playing for his native Wales in their European Cup success in 2009. Mills was dual registered with the South Wales Scorpions in the Championship 1 during the 2010 season before signing for the Scorpions in January 2011.

== Background ==
Lewis Mills was born in Cardiff, Glamorgan, Wales.
