= Tommy Lee (rugby league) =

Former English rugby league footballer

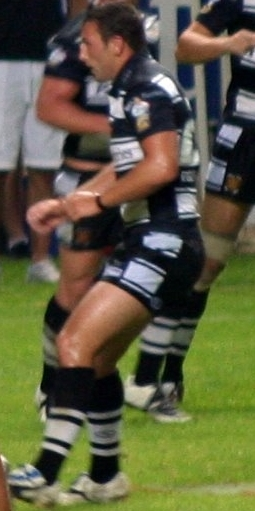

Personal information
- Full name: Thomas Lee
- Born: 1 February 1988 (age 38) Kingston upon Hull, Humberside, England

Playing information
- Height: 5 ft 10 in (1.78 m)
- Weight: 15 st 2 lb (96 kg)

Rugby league
- Position: Hooker, Scrum-half, Loose forward, Stand-off
Club
Years	Team	Pld	T	G	FG	P
2005–09	Hull FC	78	5	0	0	20
2010	Crusaders RL	12	0	0	0	0
2011	Wakefield Trinity Wildcats	27	7	0	0	28
2012	Huddersfield Giants	18	2	0	0	8
2013	London Broncos	24	2	0	0	8
2014–16	Salford Red Devils	51	4	2	0	20
2017	St Helens	19	0	0	0	0
2018–19	Hull Kingston Rovers	37	3	0	0	12
2020	Halifax	0	0	0	0	0
	Total	266	23	2	0	96

Rugby union
Club
Years	Team	Pld	T	G	FG	P
2020	Hull RUFC	0	0	0	0	0

Thomas Lee (born 1 February 1988) is an English former professional rugby league footballer who last played as a hooker for Halifax RLFC in the Championship. Lee has played for eight different clubs during his career.

Lee has previously played for St Helens, Salford Red Devils, London Broncos, Huddersfield Giants, Wakefield Trinity Wildcats, Crusaders RL and Hull F.C.

== Background ==
Lee was born in Kingston upon Hull, Humberside, England.

== Early career ==
As a halfback, Lee progressed through Hull's Academy ranks via amateur club west Hull.

== Senior career ==
=== Hull F.C. (2005-09) ===
Lee made his professional rugby league début in 2005. Over five-years, Lee made 78 first-grade appearances for Hull F.C.

=== Crusaders RL (2010) ===
Lee spent only one season in 2010 at Brewery Field, with the Crusaders RL.

=== Wakefield Trinity Wildcats (2011) ===
Once again, Lee only spent one season with the Wakefield Trinity Wildcats in the 2011 Super League season. He went onto record 27 appearances and scored seven tries.

=== Huddersfield Giants (2012) ===
Lee played for the Huddersfield Giants in the 2012 rugby league season. Lee only represented the West Yorkshire outfit for one season, before moving to the London Broncos.

=== London Broncos (2013) ===
Lee played one season in the south of England with the London Broncos in the 2013 campaign.

=== Salford Red Devils (2014-16) ===
Lee played for the Salford Red Devils in the 2014, 2015 and 2016 seasons. Lee made 51 appearances, scoring four tries and kicking two goals, for the team from the AJ Bell Stadium.

=== St. Helens (2017) ===
The start of the 2017 season marked the fifth time that Lee had represented a club for only a solitary campaign. As he played for St. Helens making 19 appearances, before moving back to the city of Kingston upon Hull to play under Head Coach Tim Sheens, for newly-promoted Hull Kingston Rovers.

=== Hull Kingston Rovers (2018 - 2019) ===
On 24 October 2017, it was revealed that Lee had signed a two-year contract to play for Hull Kingston Rovers in the 2018 and 2019 Super League seasons. Lee scored his first try for Hull Kingston Rovers at the 2018 Magic Weekend against Hull F.C. On 2019, Lee announced his retirement

=== Halifax ===
On 5 March 2020 it was announced that he had come out of retirement to join Halifax to fill the void created by the sudden loss of Keal Carlile, who was forced to retire due to a heart condition In January 2021, the club web site reported that Lee had been released and would not feature in the 2021 season

== Rugby Union ==
On 27 February 2020 it was announced that Lee had signed up to Hull RUFC
