= Lee Williams (rugby league) =

Wales international rugby league footballer

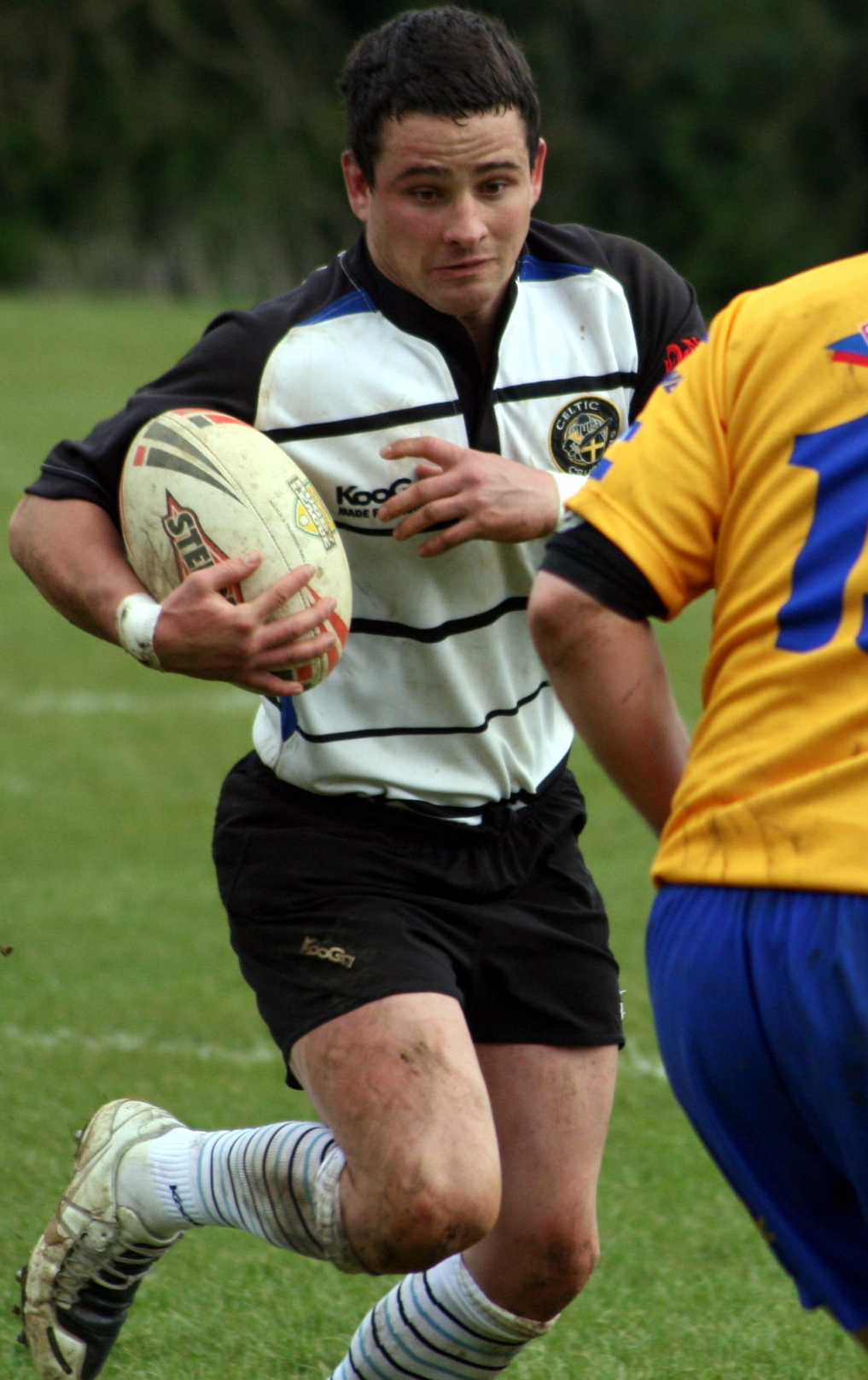

Personal information
- Born: 19 December 1988 (age 37) Aberdare, Wales

Playing information
- Position: Centre, Wing
Club
Years	Team	Pld	T	G	FG	P
2006–11	Celtic Crusaders
2010–11	South Wales Scorpions	28	7	0	0	27
2011	North Wales Crusaders	8	0	0	0	0
	Total	36	7	0	0	27
Representative
Years	Team	Pld	T	G	FG	P
2008–11	Wales	7	2	0	0	8
- Source: As of 6 December 2019

Lee Williams (born 19 December 1988) is a Welsh international rugby league footballer who plays for the Mackay Cutters in the Queensland Cup. He previously played for the Crusaders in the Super League, and for the South Wales Scorpions in the Championship One. He plays as a centre or on the wing.

== Background ==
Williams was born in Aberdare, Wales.

== International honours ==
Lee Williams made his début for Wales while at Celtic Crusaders in 2008.

He featured in the 2009 European Cup game against Ireland scoring one try.
