= John Dixon (rugby league) =

Professional RL coach and Australian former rugby league footballer

Personal information
- Full name: John Dixon
- Born: December 1951 (age 74) Australia

Coaching information
Club
Years	Team	Gms	W	D	L	W%
	Toowoomba Clydesdales
2005–09	Celtic Crusaders
2010	Redcliffe Dolphins
	Total	0	0	0	0
Representative
Years	Team	Gms	W	D	L	W%
2008	Wales	1	0	0	1	0
- As of 4 February 2021

John Dixon (born December 1951) is an Australian former rugby league football coach and player. He played during the 1970s and coached the Crusaders RL club of Super League and was also head coach of Wales RL until mid-2009.

== Background ==
John Dixon was born in Toowoomba, Queensland. Australia.

== Playing career ==
Dixon played for Toowoomba (including one game against a touring Great Britain side in 1974) and also had spells in Dalby and Rockhampton.

== Coaching career ==
Working as a teacher, he took to coaching when he retired from playing, becoming coach of the Toowoomba Clydesdales and also working for 10 years at the Brisbane Broncos from 1995 in various coaching and development roles under Wayne Bennett. After that he moved to Wales and took on the coaching job at the Celtic Crusaders, who in 2008 won the opportunity to join the Super League competition from 2009. Also in 2008, Dixon was selected as coach of the Wales until succeeded by Iestyn Harris in mid-2009. At the end of 2009's Super League XIV Dixon, who had coached every game of the Celtic Crusaders' four-year history stood down. In 2010 he coached the Redcliffe Dolphins of the Queensland Cup.

== Sources ==
Notes

Bibliography

- My Life in Rugby League: John Dixon - Celtic Crusaders - article at totlrl.com
- Darren is on the Mapp - article at thisissouthwales.co.uk
