= Marshall Chalk =

Australian rugby league footballer

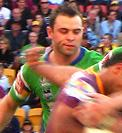
- Chalk playing for Canberra in 2008
- Born: 13 March 1981 (age 45); Boonah, Queensland, Australia
- Rugby league career

Personal information
- Height: 181 cm (5 ft 11 in)
- Weight: 94 kg (14 st 11 lb)

Playing information
- Position: Wing, Centre, Lock, Fullback
Club
Years	Team	Pld	T	G	FG	P
2004–08	Canberra Raiders	71	23	0	0	92
2009	Crusaders RL	14	4	0	0	16
	Total	85	27	0	0	108
- Source: As of 25 January 2019

Member of the Scenic Rim Regional Council
- Incumbent
- Assumed office 28 March 2020
- Preceded by: Rick Stanfield
- Constituency: Division 5

Personal details
- Party: Independent

Marshall Chalk (born 13 March 1981) is an Australian former professional rugby league footballer and current local politician. He played in the 2000s played for Canberra and Crusaders in the Super League. Since 2020 he has been councillor for division 5 on the Scenic Rim Regional Council.

== Background ==
Chalk was born in Boonah, Queensland, Australia.

== Playing career ==
Chalk made his first grade debut on 22 August 2004 against the Sydney City Roosters. In his 2nd first grade game, Chalk scored 4 tries as Canberra defeated South Sydney 62–22.

Chalk played a total of 71 games for Canberra and his last game for the club was a 36–10 loss against Cronulla in the 2008 qualifying final.

In 2009, he joined newly promoted Super League Welsh side Crusaders, where he played 14 games, scoring 4 tries; before returning to his native Australia for the 2010 season signed with the Gold Coast but did not make any first grade appearances for the club.

== Politics ==
At the 2020 Queensland local government elections, Chalk ran in division 5 of the Scenic Rim Regional Council and won the seat.
