= Rocky Trimarchi =

Italy international rugby league footballer

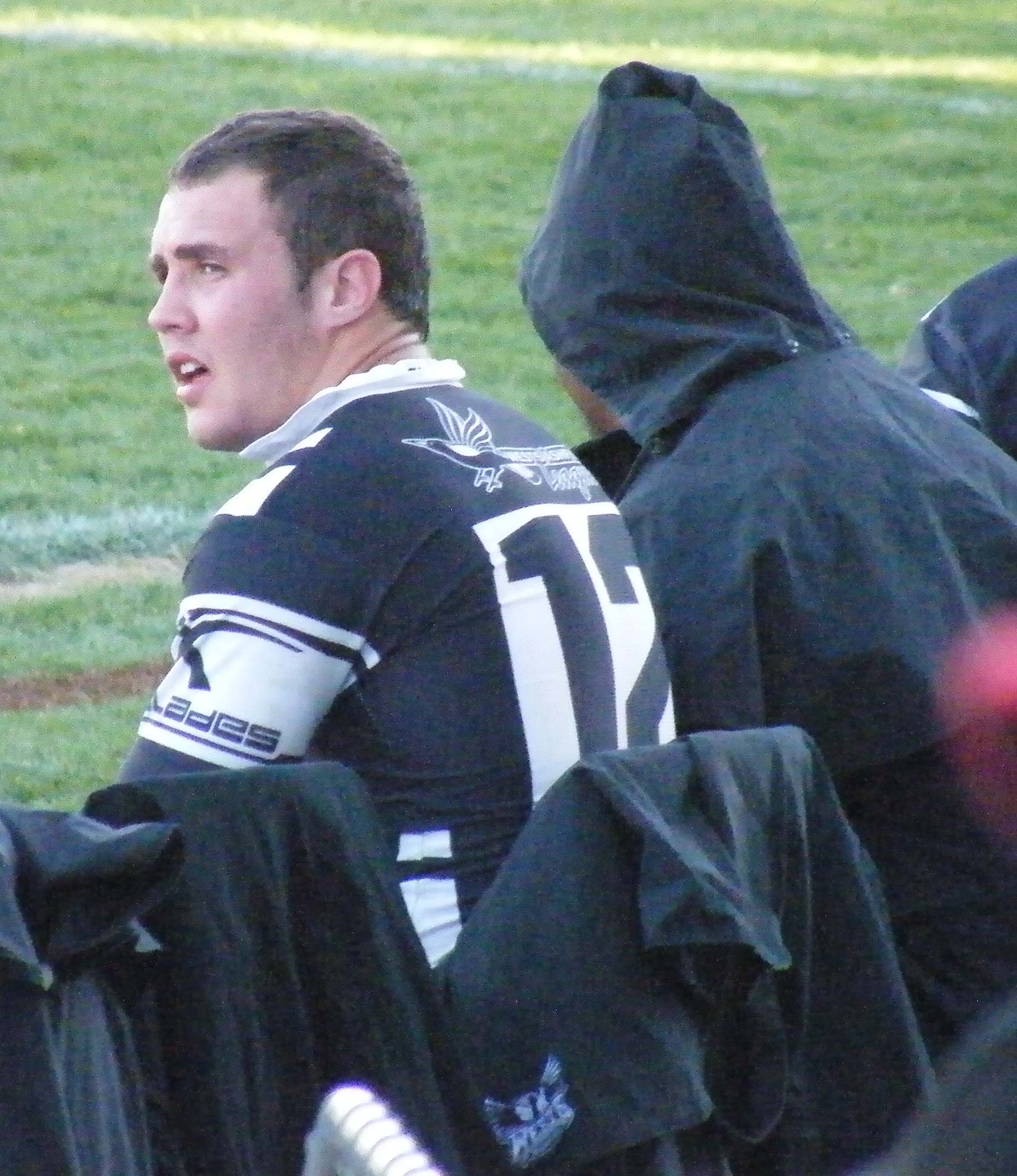

Personal information
- Full name: Rocky Trimarchi
- Born: 7 January 1986 (age 40) Campbelltown, New South Wales, Australia
- Height: 185 cm (6 ft 1 in)
- Weight: 98 kg (15 st 6 lb)

Playing information
- Position: Lock, Second-row
Club
Years	Team	Pld	T	G	FG	P
2006–09	Wests Tigers	8	1	0	0	4
2010	Crusaders	26	0	0	0	0
	Total	34	1	0	0	4
Representative
Years	Team	Pld	T	G	FG	P
2010	Italy	1	0	0	0	0

Rocky Trimarchi is an Australian former professional rugby league footballer who last played for the Western Suburbs Magpies in the Ron Massey Cup. He had previously played in the NRL for the Wests Tigers and in the Super League for Crusaders. His position of choice was as a lock and he could also play in the second-row.

== Playing career ==
Trimarchi made his NRL début on 16 April 2006, scoring a try in his ninth minute on the field against the Cronulla-Sutherland Sharks. He played for 4 seasons with the Tigers, before being released at the end of the 2009 season.

Shortly before the start of the 2010 season, Trimarchi signed with Crusaders of the Super League. He played one season with the club, appearing in 26 games before returning to Australia.

He is of Italian descent. In 2011, he was announced as a member of the Italian side that competed in the 2013 World Cup qualifying.

Also in 2011, Trimarchi joined Group 6 country rugby league side the Narellan Jets.
