= Anthony Blackwood =

Wales international rugby league footballer

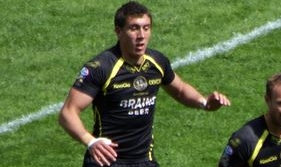

Personal information
- Born: 13 September 1982 (age 43) Barrow-In-Furness, England
- Height: 6 ft 3 in (1.91 m)
- Weight: 15 st 0 lb (95 kg)

Playing information
- Position: Second-row, Wing
Club
Years	Team	Pld	T	G	FG	P
2002–03	Leigh Centurions	6	3	0	0	12
2003(loan)	→ Chorley Lynx	10	2	0	0	8
2005–06	Halifax	49	26	0	0	104
2007–10	Crusaders RL	68	30	0	0	120
2010(loan)	→ South Wales Scorpions	1	0	0	0	0
2010	Barrow Raiders	21	7	0	0	28
	Total	155	68	0	0	272
Representative
Years	Team	Pld	T	G	FG	P
2005–08	Wales	7	0	3	0	12
- Source: As of 27 March 23

Anthony Blackwood (born 13 September 1982) is an English professional rugby league footballer who played for the Crusaders RL in the Super League, and the South Wales Scorpions in Championship 1. He has previously represented Wales and played as a centre or wing.

== Background ==
Blackwood was born in Barrow-In-Furness, Cumbria, England.

== Playing career ==
Formerly a back-row player, Blackwood signed for Crusaders in 2007 from Halifax. He is a former Leigh Centurions academy captain.

== International honours ==
Blackwood made his Wales début against Scotland in 2005, winning caps for Wales while at Halifax, and Celtic Crusaders 2005...present 7(6?)-caps 3-tries 12-points.

A regular and one of the most committed Welsh internationals, Anthony joined the Crusaders from Halifax at the start of last season following an impressive record with the Yorkshire-side. He continued to impress at the Crusaders in both the 2007 and 2008 season scoring 14 tries in year one followed by 11 in 2008
