= Peter Lupton =

US & Wales international rugby league footballer and coach

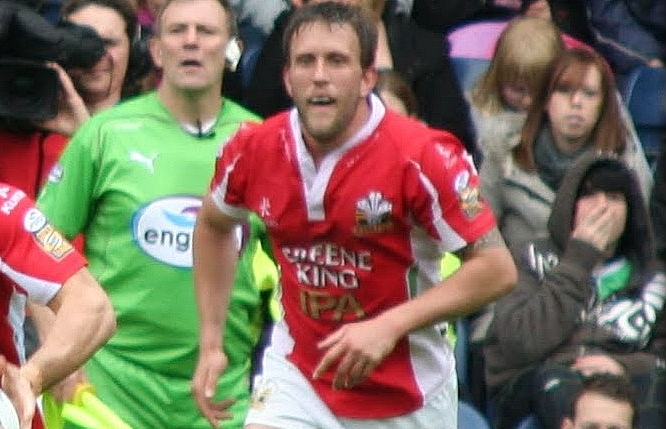

Personal information
- Born: 7 March 1982 (age 44) Whitehaven, Cumbria, England
- Height: 5 ft 11 in (1.80 m)
- Weight: 14 st 0 lb (89 kg)

Playing information

Rugby league
- Position: Loose forward, Second-row, Stand-off, Scrum-half
Club
Years	Team	Pld	T	G	FG	P
2000–02	London Broncos	27	2	2	0	12
2003–05	Hull FC	48	10	3	1	47
2006–08	Castleford Tigers	42	12	0	0	48
2009–11	Crusaders RL	70	16	0	0	64
2012–14	Workington Town	67	14	2	2	62
2015	Barrow Raiders	23	7	0	0	28
2021–26	Boston 13s	0	0	0	0	0
2026–	New York Knights	0	0	0	0	0
	Total	277	61	7	3	261
Representative
Years	Team	Pld	T	G	FG	P
2003	Cumbria	1	0	4	0	8
2011–14	Wales	7	1	0	0	4
2023–25	United States	5	1	0	0	4

Rugby union
- Position: Centre
Club
Years	Team	Pld	T	G	FG	P
2018–20	New England Free Jacks
2020	Boston Irish Wolfhounds
	Total	0	0	0	0	0

Coaching information
Club
Years	Team	Gms	W	D	L	W%
2021–25	Boston 13s	0	0	0	0
- Source: As of 18 October 2026

Peter Lupton (born 7 March 1982) is a professional rugby footballer who plays and coaches rugby league for the New York Knights in the North American Rugby League competition.

Lupton began his career playing rugby league as a loose forward, second-row, stand-off, or scrum-half in England and Wales. He earned selection in the Welsh national team after qualifying through 3-years residency, and later captained the team at the 2014 European Cup. In 2016, Lupton moved to Boston, United States, and played rugby union professionally and rugby league as an amateur. He was named player-coach of the Boston Thirteens for their first season as a semi-professional club in 2021.

== Background ==
Lupton was born in Whitehaven, Cumbria, England.

== Career ==
=== Rugby league ===
He has previously played for Workington Town in Championship 1 and Crusaders in the Super League.

Whilst playing for the Castleford Tigers and the Crusaders, he played centre, stand-off, scrum-half or loose forward.

Lupton has previously played for the London Broncos and Hull FC.

In March 2015, Lupton signed with the Barrow Raiders

In 2016, Lupton joined the Boston 13s in the USA Rugby League. He was named as coach in 2017, continuing the role in 2021 as the club joined the inaugural North American Rugby League season and turned semi-professional.

On 8 May 2026 it was reported that he had joined the reformed New York Knights.

=== Rugby union ===
In the fall of 2018, Lupton signed with the New England Free Jacks in the MLR.

== International ==
Lupton was named in the Welsh squad for the 2011 Four Nations, qualifying on 3-years residency. He made his début in a warm-up match against Ireland, but did not feature in the tournament.

Lupton played for Wales at the 2013 World Cup, and captained the side at the 2014 European Cup in the absence of Craig Kopczak. In that tournament, Lupton captained the Welsh side in losses against Scotland, France, and Ireland.

On 1 March 2024 he was named in the United States team for the test against Canada staged in Las Vegas on 3 Mar 2024. In November of 2024, Lupton was named in the United States team for a two-test tour of South Africa.
