= Gareth Dean =

Former Wales international rugby league footballer

Personal information
- Full name: Gareth Dean
- Born: 31 March 1981 (age 44); Ynysybwl, Rhondda Cynon Taf, Wales

Playing information
- Position: Prop
Club
Years	Team	Pld	T	G	FG	P
2002	London Broncos
2006–08	Celtic Crusaders	61	4	0	0	16
2010	AS Carcassonne
	Total	61	4	0	0	16
Representative
Years	Team	Pld	T	G	FG	P
2001–10	Wales	10	0	0	0	0
- As of 16 February 2021

Gareth Dean (born 31 March 1981) is a Welsh former professional rugby league footballer who played in the 2000s. He played for the South Wales Scorpions in the Championship One and AS Carcassonne in the Elite One Championship. His position is at prop. He has previously played for the Wigan Warriors, Crusaders, Cardiff Demons and London Broncos.

== International honours ==
Gareth Dean won caps for Wales while at Wigan, unattached, Workington Town, AS Carcassonne, and the Celtic Crusaders 2001...2007 7(10, 12?)-caps + 4-caps (interchange/substitute).
