= Terry Martin (rugby league) =

Australian rugby league footballer

Personal information
- Full name: Terry Martin
- Born: 25 May 1980 (age 46) Canberra, ACT, Australia

Playing information
- Height: 184 cm (6 ft 0 in)
- Weight: 98 kg (216 lb; 15 st 6 lb)
- Position: Second-row
Club
| Years | Team | Pld | T | G | FG | P |
|---|---|---|---|---|---|---|
| 2000–06 | Canberra Raiders | 92 | 9 | 0 | 0 | 36 |
| 2007–08 | Crusaders | 31 | 4 | 0 | 0 | 16 |
| | Total | 123 | 13 | 0 | 0 | 52 |

Terry Martin (born 25 May 1980) is an Australian former professional rugby league footballer who last played for the Crusaders in National League One. He played in the second-row. He had previously played for the Canberra Raiders in the NRL and has representative experience with the Australian Schoolboys side.

== Background ==
Terry Martin was born in Canberra, Australian Capital Territory (ACT), Australia.

== Playing career ==
While attending Erindale College, Martin played for the Australian Schoolboys team in 1998.
