= Chris Beasley (rugby league) =

Wales international rugby league footballer

Personal information
- Born: 17 October 1983 (age 42) Sydney, Australia
- Height: 183 cm (6 ft 0 in)
- Weight: 94 kg (207 lb; 14 st 11 lb)

Playing information
- Position: Second-row, Lock
Club
| Years | Team | Pld | T | G | FG | P |
|---|---|---|---|---|---|---|
| | Balmain Tigers | 0 | 0 | 0 | 0 | 0 |
| | Saint-Gaudens Bears | 0 | 0 | 0 | 0 | 0 |
| 2006–09 | Crusaders | 76 | 5 | 1 | 0 | 22 |
| | Total | 76 | 5 | 1 | 0 | 22 |
Representative
| Years | Team | Pld | T | G | FG | P |
| 2011 | Wales | 6 |

Chris Beasley (born 17 October 1983) is a former Welsh international professional rugby league footballer. He played at representative level for Wales, and at club level for Sydney Roosters, Balmain Tigers, RC Saint-Gaudens in France, Crusaders in 2009's Super League XIV and Central Comets in the Queensland Cup, as a second-row, or lock.

== Background ==
Chris Beasley was born in Sydney, Australia.
