= Darren Mapp =

Australian rugby league footballer

Personal information
- Full name: Darren Mapp
- Born: 8 October 1980 (age 46) Albury, New South Wales, Australia
- Height: 188 cm (6 ft 2 in)
- Weight: 100 kg (15 st 10 lb)

Playing information
- Position: Prop
Club
| Years | Team | Pld | T | G | FG | P |
|---|---|---|---|---|---|---|
| 2000 | Brisbane Broncos | 3 | 0 | 0 | 0 | 0 |
| 2001–02 | Canberra Raiders | 26 | 4 | 0 | 0 | 16 |
| 2003–05 | Brisbane Broncos | 35 | 1 | 0 | 0 | 4 |
| 2006 | Cronulla-Sutherland | 2 | 0 | 0 | 0 | 0 |
| 2007–09 | Celtic Crusaders | 61 | 17 | 0 | 0 | 68 |
| | Total | 127 | 22 | 0 | 0 | 88 |

Darren Mapp (born 8 October 1980 in Albury) is an Australian former professional rugby league footballer who last played for the Central Comets in the Queensland Cup. He previously played several seasons for the Brisbane Broncos, the Canberra Raiders and the Cronulla-Sutherland Sharks in the National Rugby League competition and the Crusaders in the Super League, as a prop.

== Celtic Crusaders ==
In 2008, Mapp became captain of the Celtic Crusaders team.

In August 2009, Mapp, along with five teammates, was ordered to leave the United Kingdom after the UK Border Agency identified breaches to their visa conditions. Celtic Crusaders cancelled Mapp's contract with immediate effect.

== Career highlights ==
- Junior Club: Moss Vale Dragons
- A Grade Record: 64 appearances scoring 5 tries
