= Geraint Davies (rugby league) =

Wales international rugby league footballer

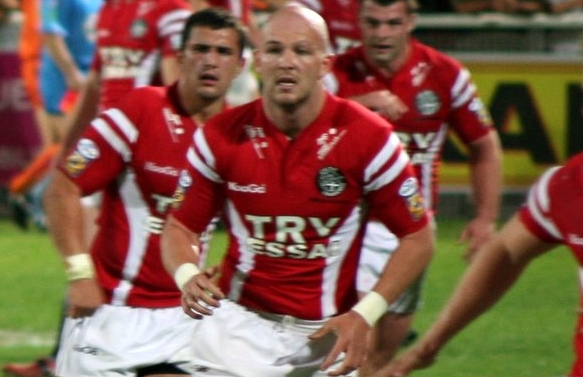

Personal information
- Full name: Geraint Davies
- Born: 7 March 1986 (age 40) Swansea, Wales

Playing information
- Height: 6 ft 2 in (188 cm)
- Weight: 16 st 0 lb (102 kg)
- Position: Prop, Loose forward
Club
Years	Team	Pld	T	G	FG	P
2006–10	Celtic Crusaders	47	7	0	0	28
2010	→ South Wales Scorpions (loan)	11	0	0	0	0
2011–12	Limoux Grizzlies	36	2	0	0	8
	Total	94	9	0	0	36
Representative
Years	Team	Pld	T	G	FG	P
2008–11	Wales	11	1	0	0	4

Geraint Rhys Davies (born 7 March 1986) is a Welsh former professional rugby league and rugby union footballer who played in the 2000s and 2010s. He played representative level rugby league (RL) for Wales, and at club level in Super League for the Crusaders, on loan from the Crusaders at South Wales Scorpions and the Limoux Grizzlies as a second-row or loose forward, and played club level rugby union (RU) for Llanelli Scarlets (Academy).

== Background ==
Davies was born in Swansea. Educated at Llandovery College on a rugby scholarship, he began his rugby career in the Llanelli Scarlets academy.

== Playing career ==
Davies signed his first professional contract at 18 for the Crusaders, and later played for them in the Super League. Davies initially played prop but could also play in the back row.

Davies won the Crusaders Young Player of the Year award in 2006 after scoring six tries in 29 appearances and was an ever-present in the Welsh national squad including their successful Rugby League European Cup winning team in 2009 and 2010, coached by Iestyn Harris.

Davies won a cap for Wales while at Celtic Crusaders 2008 1-cap.

He was named in the Wales team at second row to face England at the Keepmoat Stadium prior to England's departure for the 2008 Rugby League World Cup.

Davies gained further honours while at the Crusaders in the 2009 winning Rugby League European Cup team 4-caps. He scored his sole try for Wales in their 42–12 victory over Ireland

A loan spell followed for the South Wales Scorpions, and Davies then signed for Limoux Grizzlies in the Elite One Championship where he reached a Grand Final eventually losing to Lézignan Sangliers. Whilst at Limoux Grizzlies in 2010, he was named in the Wales team at loose forward to face Italy at the Racecourse Ground prior to Wales' Rugby League European Cup defence

== Other work ==
A Welsh speaker, Geraint was often the face and voice of the Crusaders on S4C and BBC Radio Cymru. He has also co-presented S4C's Y Clwb Rygbi XIII alongside Sarra Elgan, children's programme 'Stamina' alongside Welsh rugby union international Nicky Robinson, and 'Ar dy draed' a part of S4C's programme Stwnsh.
