= Jace Van Dijk =

Netherlands international rugby league footballer

Personal information
- Born: 10 February 1981 (age 45) Australia

Playing information
- Height: 183 cm (6 ft 0 in)
- Weight: 87 kg (13 st 10 lb)
- Position: Halfback
Club
Years	Team	Pld	T	G	FG	P
2006–09	Crusaders RL	94	22	125	0	338
Representative
Years	Team	Pld	T	G	FG	P
2008–	Netherlands	2	0	3	0	6

Jace Van Dijk (born 1981) is an Australian professional rugby league footballer for the Easts Tigers in the Queensland Cup. He primarily plays at halfback or standoff. He previously played for the Crusaders in the Super League. He is of Dutch descent and plays for the Netherlands national rugby league team.

== Canberra ==
Van Dijk captained the Canberra Raiders' Premier League team to their 2003 grand final win. In the following season, he was given a position as assistant coach with the Raider's feeder team, Souths Logan.

== Celtic Crusaders ==
In 2008, Van Dijk was sidelined for three months after breaking his jaw in two places following a high tackle.

Van Dijk was the National League Two 'Player of the Year' in 2006 and Rugby League Express' 'Player of the Year' in 2007. The Crusaders' captain is third in the all-time scoring charts. He has scored 21 tries. Van Dijk was signed from Queensland Cup side Wynnum Seagulls.

In August 2009, Van Dijk, along with five teammates, was ordered to leave the United Kingdom after the UK Border Agency identified breaches to their visa conditions. Celtic Crusaders cancelled Van Dijk's contract with immediate effect.
