= Tony Duggan =

Australian rugby league footballer

Personal information
- Born: 29 August 1978 (age 48) Australia

Playing information
- Height: 178 cm (5 ft 10 in)
- Weight: 81 kg (12 st 11 lb)
- Position: Fullback
Club
Years	Team	Pld	T	G	FG	P
????–01	Wattles	0	0	0	0	0
2001–06	Toowoomba Clydesdales	0	0	0	0	0
2003	Brisbane Broncos	1	0	0	0	0
2006–09	Crusaders	88	101	0	0	404
2009–16	Lézignan Sangliers	88	62	0	0	250
	Total	177	163	0	0	654

Tony Duggan (born 29 August 1978) is an Australian former professional rugby league footballer who last played for the Lézignan Sangliers in the Elite One Championship.

== Celtic Crusaders ==
Duggan scored the first ever try for the club and is the club's record try scorer, with 101 over four seasons between 2006 and 2009, including a record 40 in the 2007 season . He was top scorer in the UK in both 2006 and 2007, and was awarded the 'League Weekly' newspaper's Try of the Season award in 2007. His usual position is fullback. He now qualifies to play for Wales.

In August 2009, Duggan, along with five teammates, was ordered to leave the United Kingdom after the UK Border Agency identified breaches to their visa conditions. Celtic Crusaders cancelled Duggan's contract with immediate effect.
