= Damien Quinn (rugby league) =

Australian rugby league footballer

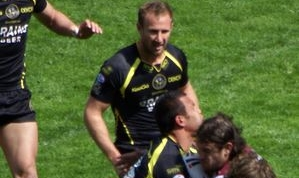

Personal information
- Born: 24 August 1981 (age 45) Australia
- Height: 185 cm (6 ft 1 in)
- Weight: 114 kg (17 st 13 lb)

Playing information
- Position: Five-eighth
Club
Years	Team	Pld	T	G	FG	P
2006–09	Crusaders RL	112	58	190	0	612
Representative
Years	Team	Pld	T	G	FG	P
2003–05	Queensland Residents	2	1	1	0	6
- Source: As of 8 January 2024

Damien Quinn (born 24 August 1981) is an Australian professional rugby league footballer.

In 2001, Quinn played on the wing for the Toowoomba Clydesdales in the Queensland Cup Grand Final against the Redcliffe Dolphins, regarded as the most exciting Grand Final in Queenaland Cup History. Quinn's position of choice is as a five-eighth. He was a key player for the Crusaders since joining in 2006, and he won National League One's Player of the Year award in 2008

In August 2009, Quinn, along with five teammates, was ordered to leave the United Kingdom after the UK Border Agency identified breaches to their visa conditions. The Celtic Crusaders cancelled Quinn's contract with immediate effect.
