= Crusaders Rugby League =

Defunct Welsh rugby league club

Club information
- Full name: Crusaders Rugby League
- Nickname(s): Cru, Saders, Celtic
- Short name: Crusaders
- Colours: Black and gold
- Founded: 2005
- Exited: 2011; 15 years ago

Former details
- Grounds: 2010–2011 Racecourse Ground (15,500-with Kop); 2005–2009 Brewery Field (12,000)
- Chairman: Ian Roberts
- Coach: Iestyn Harris
- Captain: Clinton Schifcofske
- Competition: Super League
- Super League XVI: 14th
- Current season

Uniforms
Home colours

Records
- Most capped: 112 – Damien Quinn
- Highest points scorer: 612 – Damien Quinn

Crusaders Rugby League (Welsh: Croesgadwyr Rygbi'r Gynghrair) was a professional rugby league club based in Bridgend and later in Wrexham, Wales. They played for six seasons in the Rugby Football League competitions, including three years in the Super League from 2009 to 2011.

Founded as Celtic Crusaders in 2005 initially based in Bridgend, the club played in National League Two from 2006 to 2007 and in National League One in 2008. In 2009 they were awarded a Super League licence, and in 2010 they moved from Bridgend to Wrexham in North Wales, and dropped "Celtic" from their name. After three years in the Super League, on 26 July 2011 the club announced they were withdrawing their application to remain in the league for the 2012–15 seasons. They disbanded after the 2011 season, and were succeeded by a new club, North Wales Crusaders, in Championship 1 in 2012. They played their home matches at Brewery Field then the Racecourse Ground.

The Crusaders won the National League Two championship in 2007. Their last coach was Iestyn Harris.

== History ==
=== 2003-2004: Celtic Warriors ===
In the summer of 2003, the WRU voted to reduce the top tier of Welsh professional rugby union from nine clubs into five regions. The Celtic Warriors officially represented the Mid-Glamorgan Valleys area, which in practice meant that they were a combination of Pontypridd RFC and Bridgend RFC.

The admission of the Celtic Crusaders is recognition of the progress that the sport is making in Wales. We now have a strong grass roots presence in Wales with rugby league being played in schools as well as the formation of junior teams. The impressive progress delivered by the seven Welsh clubs playing in the Conference has given rugby league a solid base of adult players and Wales has a worldwide reputation as a rugby-playing nation. The Crusaders come into professional rugby league playing out of the excellent Brewery Field Stadium in Bridgend and having lodged a robust business plan with the RFL.

— Richard Lewis, RFL Executive chairman, 2005.

We're elated by our admission to Rugby League. We feel that the time is right for professional Rugby League in South Wales. For the first time an infrastructure is in place with so much junior development of the sport taking place as well as the successful Conference division. Our aim is to reach Super League and we realise that the hard work has just started for us. We shall also be representing South Wales in Rugby League and we take that seriously.

— Chris O'Callaghan, Celtic Crusaders chief executive, 2005.

Financial problems at Pontypridd RFC led to the sale of their half of the Warriors to Bridgend RFC owner Leighton Samuel, which he gave to the WRU. He then later sold his half to the WRU who in Summer 2004 decided to liquidate the club.

=== 2005-2006: Celtic Crusaders ===
After the success of clubs in the Welsh Premier division of the Rugby League Conference, a South Wales team was mooted to join a professional league in March 2005, as the National League Two division was due to be restructured and expanded for the 2006 season. The demise of the Celtic Warriors team and backing by businessman Leighton Samuel gave an opportunity for a team to be based in Bridgend, however Coventry Bears and Bramley Buffaloes, who reached the National League Three Grand Final, also wanted a place in National League Two. The initial plan to re-use the 'Celtic Warriors' name was abandoned in favour of 'Celtic Crusaders' which had been considered by the rugby union franchise. They were to play their home games at Brewery Field and games were planned to be held at Sardis Road as well. The Rugby Football League admitted the Celtic Crusaders club; now with badge, ground, website and shareholders; on 22 June 2005 during a meeting in Salford. On 3 July, Super League teams London Broncos and Hull FC fought out a 24-all draw at the Brewery Field, drumming up 3775 fans to watch the game as part of London's on the road home games whilst their ground was being redeveloped.

The rest of 2005 was spent preparing for the upcoming season. On 13 November, Kevin Ellis was appointed Assistant Coach and a few days later on 16 November Anthony Seibold was appointed Fitness and Conditioning Coach. By the end of November coach John Dixon had completed his squad, drawn heavily from Bridgend Blue Bulls and Aberavon Fighting Irish clubs.

The club were due to play their first match against Super League giants St. Helens, but due to the team being in the World Club Challenge competition, a Harlequins RL Academy side provided the opposition for the club's inaugural match. The friendly ended in a 22–22 draw. Originally the club were to play their first competitive match at home, but their first three Northern Rail Cup games during February; against Hemel Stags, St Albans Centurions and London Skolars respectively; were switched as away games at the request from Hemel. The game against Hemel was won convincingly by the Crusaders 50–10 with Tony Duggan being the first player to score a try for the Welsh franchise (with Ryan O'Kelly being the first Welshman to score a try), and Jace Van Dijk was rewarded with the first Man of the Match award. Crusaders Academy played their first match against London Harlequins Academy on 29 January.

In the group stages of the Northern Rail Cup the Celtic Crusaders won all of their six games, scoring 374 points and conceding just 44. With an average of 62 points scored per match the Crusaders set the record for most points scored in a Northern Rail Cup group, beating the Salford City Reds' 58-points per game in 2003. Included in this winning run was the club's first home match, against London Skolars, where 1,021 people were in attendance to see the 78–14 victory.

Crusaders also entered into the Challenge Cup and were drawn against Russian team Moscow Locomotive for Round 3 of the competition. They were reigning Russian Championship and Russian Cup champions and it was one of the few times that in the cup competition's long history that two non-English sides had been drawn together. However, in a match where the pitch was covered in snow the Welsh team raced into a 30–4 lead at half-time, and the match eventually finished 64–4. Round 4 provided much tougher opponents as the Crusaders were handed an away tie with National League One side Rochdale Hornets. Just three weeks after the Moscow match, on 1 April the team suffered their first ever defeat as Hornets won 32–8 and Crusaders were thus eliminated from the 2006 Challenge Cup. Rochdale Hornets again provided the opposition in the next round of the Northern Rail Cup and again they won, this time the match finished 6–34 at the Brewery Field.

For their first season in the National League Two competition the side performed very well finishing third out of twelve teams, earning 29 points. The team scored 730 points and conceded 387. Workington Town were the opposition for the first match and surprisingly Crusaders won 18–50, ending Workington's 23-month unbeaten home record. London Skolars were brushed away with a 70–0 victory in front of 634 fans in Crusaders' first home match of the league campaign, with centre Carl De Chenu scoring four tries. The club had decided prior to the season to take two home fixtures to other parts of South Wales, the first of which was a 36–18 win over Hunslet watched by 415 people at Talbot Athletic Ground in Aberavon. In early June, Keighley went down 58–18 at Old Parish in Maesteg in the second on the road match. It was in their third week that Crusaders lost only their second match of 2006, narrowly being beaten 22–20 in a Monday night match against the Sheffield Eagles. The club were involved in one draw during the whole season, a 30–30 tie away to Keighley in May. After several key matches, in the last game of the campaign the Celtic Crusaders secured a vital 14–11 win against Featherstone Rovers on 10 September meaning they finished third overall on points difference, whilst Featherstone who also earned 29 points finished fourth. This set up a play-off match against second-placed team; the Sheffield Eagles, which was lost 26–16 at the Don Valley Stadium. A final elimination match against Swinton proved to be the team's last match of the season as the Lions won 26–27 after 91 seconds of Golden Point extra time. Sheffield beat Swinton in the final meaning them and Dewsbury Rams, who finished top of the table, were promoted.

Throughout the year the club were boosted by player and local achievements. At various times in the year Celtic Crusaders players made it into the National League Two Team of the Month, whilst full-back Tony Duggan and stand-off Jace Van Dijk were both nominated for National League Two Player of the Year, with the latter eventually picking up the honour in October. Tony Duggan was later confirmed as the top try-scorer from all three British leagues for 2006. Hooker Lloyd O'Connor was picked for the Great Britain Students side that toured Australia. whilst a further six players made it into the Wales national team that faced Scotland. During June coach Dixon signed three Welsh internationals, Gareth Dean from Carcassonne, Aled James from the Sheffield Eagles and Gareth Price from Hull Kingston Rovers. At the end of the season Welsh international Anthony Blackwood was signed from Halifax. In May, Brynteg High School in Bridgend reached the Powergen Champions School Final for the second year in a row after beating a Wigan school, but lost the final.

Some changes at the club also occurred during the year. On 8 June chief executive Chris O'Callaghan resigned after 13 months in the job, during which he was highly important in forming the club and getting them into the professional leagues. At the end of the season influential first ever captain Michael Ryan returned to his native Australia for personal reasons.

=== 2007-2008: Promotion and Super League licence ===
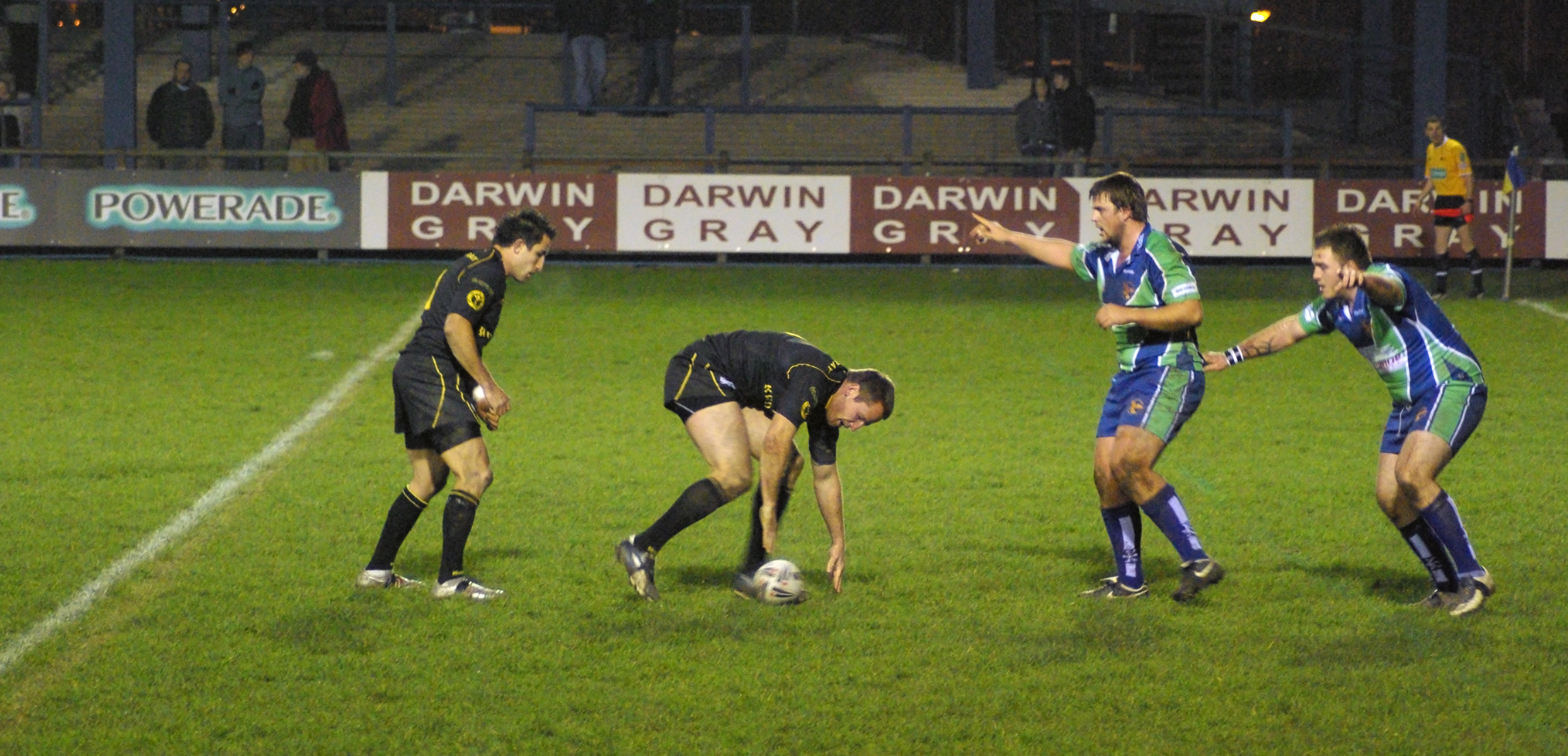
A Crusaders game in 2008

The season was crucial for the Crusaders, as to fulfill their aim of applying for a Super League licence for the 2009 season, the team would have to be playing in the National League One in 2008, and thus had to be promoted this season. Leighton Samuel brought in his solicitor, David Thompson, as chief executive of the club to oversee the application for Super League. In January both Jace Van Dijk and John Dixon finished second in the National League Two Player of the Year and National League Two Coach of the Year categories respectively at the TotalRL Fan Awards. Just before the start of the season it was announced that Welsh former player Jonathan Davies had been appointed Honorary President of the club, and that he would be attending matches throughout the year. The club also announced that they were moving their training ground to the RAF's St Athan base, beating off competition from Cardiff City who also wanted to use the facilities; and that Frenchman Thibault Giroud had been appointed as new fitness coach.

Like last year, Celtic Crusaders' first match of the new season was a Northern Rail Cup game. This year they were drawn in a group with two strong National League One clubs, Widnes and Leigh, and with London Skolars. Widnes came to a snow-hit Brewery Field on 9 February and won 6–56. It was the first ever match played under the new points system for the National Leagues and Northern Rail Cup where teams would gain 3 points for a win, 2 for a draw and 1 for a defeat by less than 12 points. Crusaders earned two good victories against London Skolars, but it was the match in between these two that caused the most surprise. In the shock of the round Crusaders went to Leigh and won 22–26 in front of a crowd of 1,637, despite being 18–4 down at half-time. In the return fixture Leigh were again narrowly defeated, this time the match finishing 22–14. Despite another defeat against Widnes, Crusaders had qualified for the next round of the cup. On 21 April a Crusaders squad with 11 Welshmen in their ranks defeated Hunslet 14–28 to again qualify for the next round. However the quarter-finals is as far as the team got, losing 30–18 away to another strong National League One side in Halifax.

The squad's second match of the season, after Widnes, was not a Northern Rail Cup fixture but a match against the 2006 NRL champions Brisbane Broncos. The Broncos used the match to prepare for their World Club Challenge meeting with St Helens. This Bulmers Original Cider Challenge match attracted significant attention from the South Wales media and drew a record crowd of 2,041. Crusaders lost 6–32, with Grant Epton got Crusaders' sole try on the night.

Eastmoor Dragons were drawn against Crusaders in Round 3 of the Challenge Cup. The amateur team were beaten 50–10 at Brewery Field despite Crusaders being reduced to eleven players after Geraint Davies and Terry Martin were both sent out after 65 minutes. Just like last year Crusaders were drawn against Rochdale Hornets and for the third time were knocked out of a cup competition by them, this time losing 20–16 at Spotland.

In the second year in the National League Two competition, Crusaders finished first with 60 points and were promoted. The campaign got off to a good start, an 18–42 away win against London Skolars on the Good Friday was backed up by a 68–0 win against Blackpool in front of an Easter Monday crowd of 2,805. In late April the club broke their margin of victory and points scored in one match records due to an 82–4 win over Swinton. The points scored in one match record was later broken again in the season after an 84–10 thrashing of Hunslet on 11 August. The club suffered just one defeat at home all season against Oldham on 4 May. It was the first ever National League Two match to be shown live on Sky Sports, and was also broadcast live on BBC Radio Wales; celebrating 100 years of rugby league in Wales as Oldham were the first visitors to the Principality back in September 1907 when they recorded a 25–6 win over Merthyr Tydfil. A club record attendance of 3441 watched Crusaders cruised into a 22–4 half-time lead, before eventually losing the match 26–34. The away match against Keighley was honoured in the same historical way as on the same day as the Merthyr/Oldham match in September 1907, Ebbw Vale made the twelve-hour train trip to Keighley to play their first ever rugby league match. League leaders Featherstone Rovers were beaten 36–28 at home and then on 9 June Crusaders beat another title-contending team in Barrow 26–14 in front of S4C as the match was broadcast live across Wales. It was the first rugby league match to ever be broadcast in Welsh. A week later the club suffered their last defeat of the campaign, 23–16 by Hunslet, before putting together a run of twelve consecutive victories to win the league. The title was secured just before the last match against Gateshead, as third placed Barrow beat second placed Featherstone Rovers 30–4. Over 100 Crusaders fan made the trip up to Gateshead to see the Crusaders lift the trophy.

Progress was made off the pitch too. David Thompson announced that he had negotiated a deal between the Crusaders, Sky TV, the RFL, and S4C whereby Sky would surrender its rugby league exclusivity allowing S4C to televise live Crusader games. S4C commissioned Y Clwb Rygbi 13 programme in June, firstly covering the Crusaders versus Barrow match live and then continuing to broadcast nine matches overall in 2007 and 2008. In August the foundations were laid for an academy side for the 2008 season with the best players from the Welsh Conference league being picked for the team. Housebuilder Redrow Homes renewed their shirt sponsorship deal whilst a new branding of the club's logo, badge and jersey was announced on 3 December promoting a more progressive and modern image. After achieving promotion the team were nominated for the BBC Wales Sports Team of the Year award, but lost out to the New Saints. After leaving for Queensland at the end of the 2006 season, former coach Anthony Seibold returned to the club as Assistant Coach, operating alongside Kevin Ellis.

Despite the fact that the licensing process would determine which clubs would enter the newly expanded Super League, the Crusaders were still eager to make their mark in their new division and win the league title. A new team called the Crusaders Colts were set up to play in the Conference National division and provide a route for young Welsh players to get into the main Crusaders team. They were coached by Dan Clements and eventually came second in the league table, winning 15 out of 18 matches and beating Bramley Buffaloes 26–4 in the Grand Final. The club welcomed the news in February that the BBC were going to show their highlights programme The Super League Show across Wales throughout the forthcoming season.

After a 28–6 pre-season friendly win against Harlequins RL, the Crusaders played their first match against the Sheffield Eagles and won 12–22. In a group which also featured Doncaster and London Skolars, the Crusaders finished top of the league, winning four out of five games, with a 14–18 loss against London being their only defeat. The home game against Doncaster was due to be played on 15 March but was cancelled due to waterlogged pitch and after some consideration the Rugby Football League announced that the game was not replayed because whatever the result it would not change the league table and thus affect any qualifying issues. The Crusaders also made it through to the Challenge Cup fourth round again, being drawn against Moscow Locomotive in a repeat fixture of the third round from 2006. This time the Russians were beaten 58–10, despite the match being 10–10 at one point.

The National League One campaign got off to a great start with 14–12 victory over Dewsbury in front of a crowd of 1,618. However, in their second match a strong Sheffield Eagles team finished 25–6 winners at the Don Valley Stadium, breaking the Crusaders record of not having lost an away match since June 2007. The team bounced back with a 26–18 win over Halifax, who were at the time top of the league table, but again the team were unable to string together two wins together as a trip to Whitehaven ended in a 44–16 defeat. Halifax again provided the opposition in the first stage of the knockout rounds of the Championship Cup, after the Crusaders qualification from the group stages. The Crusaders started the match well with a try from Anthony Blackwood and controlled much of the game at the Shay. Two late tries by Halifax were not enough as the Crusaders progressed to the quarter final and a match against Widnes. In what was expected to be a fiercely competitive and close match, the Championship Cup holders were left shocked as the Crusaders ran riot resulting in a 50–18 final scoreline with seven different players all going over for tries. The semi-final was played on 14 June against the Salford City Reds travelling down to Brewery Field for the first time after being relegated from Super League the previous year. The Salford City Reds scored the first try and after 40 minutes had earned a 10–18 lead, which was quickly extended to 10–24 after the break. Two tries from the Crusaders were not enough as the Salford City Reds scored two tries in the final two minutes to comfortably win 20–36 and secure a place in the final against Doncaster. A good Championship Cup run could not be matched in the Challenge Cup as the club were drawn against Super League giants Leeds for the fourth round. The World Club Challenge champions were simply too strong for the Welshman with the match finishing a commendable 38–16 with Anthony Blackwood getting two tries and Mark Dalle Cort getting one in what was a solid performance.

In the league though Crusaders built on their impressive start notching up six wins in seven games in the months of May and June. This included a narrow 14–16 victory away at Widnes, a 56–28 win over Batley and a crucial win over Featherstone Rovers on 2 May. A club record crowd of 6,152, including top Rugby League Football officials, watched Crusaders earn their fourth win in a row against Rovers as Jordan James, Anthony Blackwood, Damien Quinn and Tony Duggan scored tries to seal a 28–18 win. The only defeat in that period came against the Salford City Reds who snatched a 24–22 win at the Willows, Salford. However things turned bad for the Welshmen as all three of their matches in July ended in defeat. Featherstone avenged their Brewery Field defeat as they won 42–30 at Post Office Road, Whitehaven became the only club to do the double over the Crusaders during the season as the match at Brewery Field ended 22–26, and the Crusaders were also on the wrong end of a 30–22 scoreline against Batley, who were eventually to be relegated. The last four matches, all played in August, were critical for the Crusaders chances of being in the Grand Final, and stringing four wins together against the Sheffield Eagles, the Leigh Centurions, Halifax and the Salford City Reds earned the team second place in the league and a great chance to do just that. Crusaders were matched in the qualifying play-off against first placed Salford City Reds, who had secured their superior league position in a 10–20 victory over the team in the last match of the regular season. Crusaders therefore went into the match underdogs but came out storming with eight tries resulting in an 18–44 win and a place in the Grand Final at the Halliwell Jones Stadium in Warrington. Having lost the qualifying play-off match the Salford City Reds did not make the same mistake twice in the elimination play-off and once again would be Crusaders opponents for the fifth and final time this season. In the match, the Salford City Reds scored the first two tries, before Anthony Blackwood narrowed their lead as the team went into half-time losing 6–10. A resurgence occurred though as Crusaders scored three tries in the second half, but a Salford City Reds try and a late goal pushed the match into extra-time. By this time the Crusaders had run out of steam and the Salford City Reds scored three tries over the extra-time period to win the match 18–36.

On 22 July the Rugby League Football granted the Celtic Crusaders a three-year licence from 2009 allowing the team to compete in Super League Europe, in what was the biggest event for the club since inception. Joining the Crusaders were the Salford City Reds and the original twelve teams of Super League which expanded the league to 14 teams. Controversially Widnes, Leigh, Halifax, Toulouse and Featherstone Rovers were the clubs who were not awarded a licence. The Crusaders were awarded a 'C' grade licence after varying factors such as stadium, finance, marketing, location, player strength and junior production were taken into account. With this result the club became only the third non-English side to participate in the league and the first side from Wales. For the rest of the season the club prepared for their top-flight debut, signing a new sponsorship deal with Brains Beer, and in November the team embarked a three-week training camp in Queensland. However it wasn't just the licence that propelled the Crusaders forward in 2008, the Super League trophy was brought to Bridgend and Cardiff in April with fans getting the chance to see it at shopping centres and schools, rugby league was introduced to Pembrokeshire for the first time, and just like in previous seasons various Crusaders players picked up individual awards and honours.

=== 2009-2010: Super League ===
The first season of Super League for the team was bitterly disappointing, as after three years of strong performances the Crusaders regularly struggled against the best teams in the country. Adding to the disappointment was the announcement by David Thompson, who had led the successful Super League application, that he was stepping down as chief executive to return to his legal career. Mike Turner, the club's Marketing Manager, was promoted to the position on a temporary basis and was later confirmed as a permanent appointment. and discontent as heavy rain forced Harlequins to cancel their match against Celtic Crusaders in what was due to be the club's only friendly match. Unofficially Super League was welcomed into Wales in January as Richard Lewis, the Rugby League Football Executive chairman, attended the Welsh Assembly's inaugural rugby league dinner at the Millennium Stadium. On the field the squad was bolstered by news that eight players had been granted visas just a week before the club's top-flight début as National League One Grand Finalists Tony Duggan, Josh Hannay, Mark Dalle Cort, Damien Quinn, Jace Van Dijk, Darren Mapp and new signings Australian Ryan O'Hara and Papua New Guinean Jason Chan flew to Wales. An early February start kicked off the new Super League season with the Crusaders against reigning champions Leeds Rhinos in freezing conditions at Headingley. The Rhinos scored four tries early on, before Luke Dyer scored the new team's first-ever try in Super League, but this could not be built upon as the match finished 28–6. A loss at the Salford City Reds a week later was followed by the opening home game at Bridgend versus Hull. A strong 5,200 crowd cheered their team into a 10–0 lead but Hull recovered, finishing with a 20–28 victory and leaving Crusaders with a three-game losing streak. The next match against St Helens provided a record 6,351 crowd but also went into the Super League record books as the lowest scoring match in its fourteen-year history as the Saints scraped through with a 0–4 scoring just the one try. Getting further into March, and then into April the Crusaders still found themselves searching for that illusive first win. A 27–22 away defeat by the Warrington Wolves caused the team to slump from 13th back down to 14th, the position in the table where they would stay for the rest of the season. It came as a surprise then that it was at Odsal, home of the Bradford Bulls, where the Crusaders finally got up and running with a 24–30 win. The team did well in establishing a 6–20 after 50 minutes, but the Bulls surged forward causing the Welshmen to cling onto a narrow 24–26 lead with two minutes to go before a second Luke Dyer secured the result. Unfortunately, the club were unable to capitalise on this win, as the Catalans Dragons proved too strong in the Crusaders first ever match with French opposition. In fact the Bradford match was one of the few high points in the season, a stark contrast to the previous three season. But in early June an injury-stricken side beat Wigan Warriors 22–16 at the Brewery Field to record a second win of the campaign. Although the scores were 16–16 late into the match, Peter Lupton drove into the corner to finish a memorable match in the club's history. A further two points were earned in July as four different try scorers helped the Crusaders to a 25–12 victory against the Salford City Reds. Before this, the team had largely been quite competitive despite the run of defeats, but the wheels came off as the side suffered a number of large defeats such as 34–0 against play-off challengers Catalans Dragons, 46–12 against Wakefield Trinity Wildcats and a 0–68 thrashing against Leeds Rhinos in front of a Newport crowd of 5,597. The latter match thus goes down as the worst defeat in the club's history as eight different players scored 13 tries for Leeds. Despite getting just six points in the season this wasn't a record, as Workington Town in SLI, Huddersfield Giants in SLIII, Halifax in SLVIII and Leigh Centurions in SLX all ended up with less than six points.

On 9 July the club received word that it was subject to investigations by the UK Border Agency concerning problems over players visas. A statement released by the club announced that they were fully co-operating and that the investigation wasn't just concerning the recent season, but went back over a number of years. Despite all this coach John Dixon said that none of this was having any effect on players performances. However, on 18 August, a few days before the team would face Leeds Rhinos, it was announced that the club had violated visa regulations and six Australian players were asked to leave the country, with the club soon after terminating their contracts. Jace Van Dijk, Tony Duggan and Damien Quinn, who all joined the club in 2006, as well as Darren Mapp, Mark Dalle Cort, Josh Hannay who all joined the club in 2007, were banned from entering the country for 10 years. The Rugby Football League quickly demanded an explanation from the club, in an event that naturally landed a lot of bad publicity onto the club and the league, as the club were fined £60,000. This was not the only event that stained the club's inaugural Super League season, as it was widely reported that the club were under financial difficulties. At the start of the season owner Leighton Samuels predicted a massive future for the club and that this future was secure. A little later in the season he again clarified his commitment to the club insisting that there should be no fears over the club's financial position, with Super League bosses backing these reassurances, and Anthony Seibold saying that the club will not face extinction. The club then considered a move to Newport's Rodney Parade in a bid to attract more fans and to gain extra licence points as the stadium was much more developed than Brewery Field, the latter of which Leighton Samuels no longer owned after selling the ground. Despite claims that he was helping the club prepare for the 2010 season, Leighton Samuels decided to cut his losses sometime in December 2009 and withdrew his support for the club after three years. Coach John Dixon officially left the club on 14 September after the club's last match of the season against Castleford Tigers stating that he was disappointed to be leaving after three years at the helm but respected the chairman's decision. This was amongst background rumours that Brian Noble was to be appointed to replace him. On 14 October the rumours were proved to be true as Brian Noble became the second-ever head coach of the club, with former Welsh international Iestyn Harris and former Great Britain assistant Jon Sharp being given the jobs of assistant coaches. Then in early November the club announced that it would be dropping the "Celtic" from the name to sever ties with the old Celtic Warriors rugby union team, and that the club was now to be called "Crusaders Rugby League". Alongside this a new logo was announced featuring the Prince of Wales feathers. Finally on 15 December the saga was finished as the club announced that their new home would become the Racecourse Ground in Wrexham. After selling his share in the club to Geoff Moss of Wrexham FC, Leighton Samuels stated that a pot of money was needed if the Crusaders were to survive in Wales, and that the Rugby Football League were not visionaries and did not support the club enough financially. However the RFL, alongside Geoff Moss and Wrexham FC chief executive Paul Retout were delighted with the decision. As was Brian Noble who could finally get down to signing new players for the season, as he had been unable to sign anyone in his first two months in charge due to the complications of where the team would be based.

The club were keen to move on after the previous month's fiasco insisting they would be competitive for the new season which would start with a home tie against Leeds. New players were brought into the squad such as Michael Witt, Rocky Trimarchi, and Gareth Raynor. However, the squad was also bolstered with new young Welsh players like Elliot Kear, Lewis Mills and Lloyd White. Crusaders reached the Super League play-offs; going out in the first round at Huddersfield Giants.

On 12 November 2010, the Crusaders were placed into administration due to "inherited debt".

=== 2011: Administration and liquidation ===
The club suffered a six-point deduction for going into administration at the end of the previous season.

In 2011 the Crusaders initially applied to continue their Super League licence for the 2012–15 period, but on 26 July 2011, they announced they had withdrawn their application. The club's owners, Geoff Moss and Ian Roberts pulled out stating that they were not able to fund the side anymore, which eventually led to the club being wound up in September. Attendances were down on the 2010 season. Crusaders bowed out of Super League with a 42–10 defeat at Wigan Warriors.

Crusaders were offered a position in the Co-operative Championship 1 for the 2012 season by the RFL with their request to join at Co-operative Championship level having been turned down; a rival bid from Wrexham-based Glyndwr Chargers was withdrawn. Crusaders took their place in the Championship 1 as North Wales Crusaders.

== Colours and badge ==
=== Colours ===
The club's colours were black and gold, inspired by the Flag of St David. The blue and white colours of the change strip were the same as the club colours of Bridgend RFC. For the 2009 season, the club used a red and white away strip, colours associated with Welsh national teams.

=== Badge ===
Celtic Warriors,
2004–05

Celtic Crusaders, 2008–09

Crusaders Rugby League, 2010–11

The club's first badge was used between its founding in 2005 and 2008. The badge featured the Flag of Saint David on a shield. A ribbon around the bottom of the shield bore the motto Oderint dum metuant (Latin for "Let them hate, so long as they fear"), which is attributed to the Roman tragic poet, Lucius Accius and later became famous as a saying of the Emperor Caligula. Above and below the shield were the world "Celtic" and "Crusaders Rugby League Club" respectively.

The Crusaders' next badge was adopted following the 2007 season. David Thompson, the then chief executive commented, "The new badge is modern, progressive and business-friendly. Our Welsh identity is prominent as ever through the gold and black Flag of St David which still provides the colours of our home strip". The round badge, ringed with "Celtic Crusaders", features a warrior holding a sword and a shield with the Flag of St David on it, in the background are two Celtic knots. The badge bears striking similarity to the badge intended for use during the Celtic Warriors' unplayed 2004/05 season.

The club have revealed a new logo ready for use in the 2010 season. The badge, inspired by the Prince of Wales's feathers, has three white feathers adorning the centre of a disc with the Flag of St David on. To the left and right of the feathers, the words "Rugby" and "League" appear on the disc. Beneath the feathers is written "Crusaders". The logo was created by Matthew Haselden a designer based in the midlands.

== Stadiums ==
=== 2005-2009: Brewery Field ===
For four seasons Brewery Field was the home of the Crusaders, from 2006 to 2009. It is located in Bridgend, South Wales and the first match ever played there was against Harlequins Academy on 29 January 2006, however, the first competitive fixture was against London Skolars on 5 March 2006. It is the twelfth largest stadium in Wales, and in 2009 was the smallest stadium in Super League, with a capacity of 8,000. The ground was built in 1920 and is now home to Bridgend Ravens rugby union and Bridgend football clubs. The club played a total of 58 matches at Brewery Field, including the club's first-ever Super League game against Hull. A game against Huddersfield Giants in Super League XIV was the last ever time the team played at Brewery Field on 5 September 2009.

=== 2010-2011: The Racecourse ===
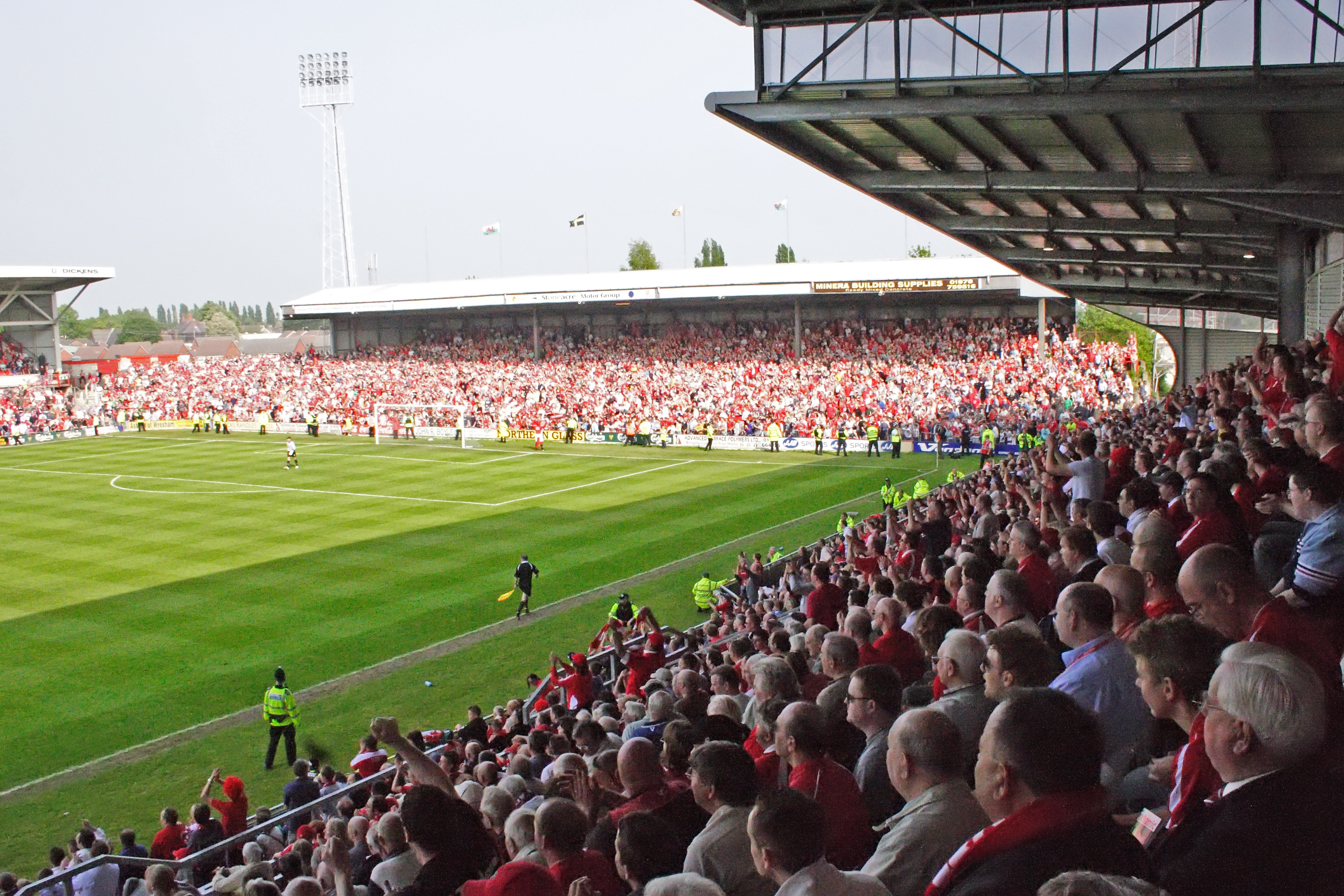
The Racecourse Ground Stadium, Wrexham

The Racecourse Ground is located in Wrexham in North Wales and was the official home of the Crusaders and where most matches are played. The club moved to the ground in 2010, in time for the start of the Super League XV season. The first Crusaders match ever played there was against Leeds Rhinos on 29 January 2010, and that match is also the highest attendance for a Crusaders match played in Wrexham. With a capacity of 15,500 it is the largest ground in North Wales, the fifth largest in the whole of Wales, and the seventh-largest in Super League. It was first built in 1807 and first played host to Wrexham's "Town Purse" horse race. Crowd trouble stopped the horse racing and in 1864 it became home to Wrexham Association Football Club with the club now owning the ground. The Wales national rugby league team have played there once against Italy. The ground has four stands: The Mold Road Stand, The Eric Roberts Stand, The Kop and The Yale. Crusaders have played a total of 12 games at The Racecourse. Before the move to the Racecourse Ground, there were plans for a new Bridgend stadium to be built for the Crusaders as well as for other sporting games.

== Coaches ==
Last updated on 1 November 2011

Name	Nat.	Tenure	Matches won	%	Super League won	$	[[RFL Championship|Nat. League 1]] Won	%	Nat. League 2 Won	%	Chall. Cup Won	%	Champ. Cup Won	%
John Dixon	(Australia)	October 2005 – 14 September 2009	69/123	56	3/27	11	13/20	65	33/46	72	3/7	43	17/23	74
Brian Noble	(England)	14 October 2009 – 7 November 2010	13/30	43	12/28	43	–	–	–	–	1/2	50	–	–
Iestyn Harris	(Wales)	8 November 2010 – 1 October 2011	–	–	–	–	–	–	–	–	–	–	–	–

== Support ==
Having been the only top tier rugby league team in Wales the Crusaders have pockets of supporters all around the country, but particularly in the Glamorgan and Wrexham areas where the team had regularly played matches. The club generally attracted 5000 supporters to home matches, and whilst a low away support has been criticised around 1000 fans made the trip up to Yorkshire to see the Crusaders face the Huddersfield Giants in the Super League XV Play-offs. The club had stated that they want to expand their presence into other areas of North Wales other than Wrexham. Television presence in the form of S4C, BBC Sport and more recently Sky Sports has enabled people all over the United Kingdom to watch live matches, whilst regional coverage regularly follows the Crusaders in news bulletins. Newspapers in Wales have supported the Crusaders since formation such as the Western Mail, South Wales Echo, South Wales Evening Post and Y Cymro in the south of the country; and The Leader and The Flintshire Chronicle in the north of the country. The Crusaders Rugby League Supporters Club was formed in 2010 to provide a link between the club and fans, and replaced the old Celtic Crusaders Supporters Club that had branches in Cardiff, Newport, West Wales and Manchester amongst others. The club has also had various groups of supporters form their own rugby league teams such as the Celtic Crusaders Vagabonds who played in the Isle of Man and the Celtic Barbarians based in Wrexham. The club has several notable fans like Welsh rugby union international Gavin Henson, TNA wrestler Rob Terry, Plaid Cymru politician Janet Ryder and Carwyn Jones, the First Minister of Wales. Online the club had their own Facebook page, whilst fans generally used the Crusaders Til I Die or Red Passion forums to talk about the club, the latter of which is a Wrexham FC forum but which had a Crusaders board and large contingent of Crusaders supporters.

== Academy ==
Like all other Super League clubs, the Crusaders ran several teams as part of their academy system that operate under the main team and provide a route into it. The Reserve team were formed in 2006 and played friendly matches for two years before eventually being replaced by the Crusaders Colts, as part of a joint-development programme between the club and the Wales Rugby League board. The team played in the Conference National division in 2008, the fourth tier of rugby league, finishing second in the league table and beating Bramley Buffaloes in the Grand Final.

Due to the club's promotion into Super League, the team dropped their Colts name and joined the Super League Reserve League for 2009. In their first match they beat Leeds Rhinos 48–40, but could only achieve two more victories in the season, against Castleford Tigers and Hull KR. All the reserves team's matches for the 2009 season were played at Old Parish in Maesteg. The move to Wrexham in 2010 coincided with the formation of the South Wales Scorpions, for whom many of the reserve side ended up playing and who maintain strong links with the Crusaders.

Despite currently no longer having a reserve side, there are plans for a team to be formed in North Wales in the future. The Crusaders under-18 side were formed for the 2008–2009 Gillette National Youth League Winter season, winning the league in their first season and finishing fifth in their second, whilst still being based in South Wales. In 2009 the club's first under-16 side was set up, and in 2010 an under-15 team was added to this scholarship programme. The Crusaders also have four development squads based in Bridgend, Cardiff/Newport, Merthyr Tydfil and Swansea/Port Talbot that consist of juniors aged 12–16. Crusaders also have a junior team playing in the Gillette National Youth League under the name North Wales Crusaders.

== Seasons ==
Season	League										Challenge Cup	Other Competitions		Refs
Season	Division	P	W	D	L	F	A	Pts	Pos	Play-offs	Challenge Cup	Other Competitions		Refs
2006	National League Two	22	14	1	7	730	387	29	3rd	Lost in Semi Final	R4	National League Cup	R:16	
2007	National League Two	22	19	0	3	918	345	60	1st	Promoted as champions	R4	National League Cup	QF	
2008	National League One	18	12	0	6	511	391	40	2nd	Lost in Final	R4	National League Cup	SF	
2009	Super League	27	3	0	24	357	874	6	14th	Did not qualify	R4			
2010	Super League	27	12	0	15	547	732	24	8th	Lost in Elimination play-offs	R5			
2011	Super League	27	6	0	21	527	857	8	14th	Did not qualify	R4			

== Honours ==
- National League One: Runners-up: 2008
- National League Two: Champions: 2007

== Records ==
=== Team records ===
- Biggest winning margin: 78 (82–4 v. Swinton Lions at Brewery Field, 28 April 2007)
- Biggest losing margin: 68 (68–0 v. Leeds Rhinos at Rodney Parade, 22 August 2009)
- Most points scored: 84 (84–10 v. Hunslet Hawks at Brewery Field, 11 August 2007)
- Most points conceded: 68 (68–0 v. Leeds Rhinos at Rodney Parade, 22 August 2009)

=== Individual records ===
- Most appearances: 112 – Damien Quinn
- Most points scored: 612 – Damien Quinn
- Most tries scored: 101 – Tony Duggan
- Most goals scored: 190 – Damien Quinn

== See also ==
- Rugby Football League expansion
- North Wales Crusaders
