= International rugby league in 2011 =

This is a list of international rugby league matches played throughout 2011. A † denotes a recognised, but unofficial match that did not contribute to the IRL World Rankings.

== March ==
=== Donnybrook Cup ===
United States 8-26 Ireland

== May ==
=== ANZAC Test ===
6 May 2011
8:00pm (BST)

Australia	20 – 10	New Zealand
Tries; Billy Slater (2', 68') 2 Jharal Yow Yeh (20') 1 Jamal Idris (71') 1 Goals; Johnathan Thurston 2/4 (3', 69')		Tries; 1 (36') Matt Duffie; 1 (80') Lance Hohaia; Goals; 1/2 (37') Benji Marshall

Skilled Park, Gold Coast
Attendance: 26,301
Referee: Richard Silverwood (England)
Player of the Match: Paul Gallen

== June ==
=== International Origin ===
10 June 2011

England	12 – 16	Exiles
Tries: Myler, J.Tomkins; Goals: Sinfield 2/2	(Report)	Tries: Manu, Meli, Carmont; Goals: Richards 2/3

Headingley, Leeds, England
Attendance: 14,174
Referee: Richard Silverwood
Player of the Match: Rangi Chase (Exiles)

== July ==
=== European Shield ===
2011-07-09

Norway	32–28	Germany
Tries: Ingebrigsten (2), N. Haigh, Schmidt, Mellor, L. Haigh; Goals: Meldalen (3), Elgheim	(Report)	Tries: Schoengen, Ayachi, Szehofner, Hoggins, N. Keinhorst; Goals: K. Keinhorst (3)

Bislett Stadion, Oslo

2011-07-23

Germany	36–12	Malta
'Tries: J. Keinhorst (4), Stocks, Isaak; Goals: K. Keinhorst (6)	(Report)	Tries: Sammut, Parker; Goals: Marzella (2)

Hochspeyer

2011-09-02

Malta	64–24	Norway
Tries: Sammut (4), Gilmour (3), Bartlett (2), Criminale, Pavanello; Goals: Sammut (10)	(Report)	Tries: Mellor (2), Meldalen (2), Elgheim; Goals: Meldalen (2)

FC Melita, Pembroke

=== European Bowl ===
23 July 2011

Hungary	16–38	Czech Republic
Tries: Torrance, Bihari L., Angel; Conv: Torrance (2)	(Report)	Tries: Mulhall, Leeuw (3), Buben (2), Sedina; Conv: Buben (4) Mulhall (1)

Széktói Stadion, Kecskemét

=== Caribbean Carnival Cup ===
Canada 40-10 Jamaica

== August ==
=== Colonial Cup ===
- United States 18-2 Canada
- Canada 18-16 United States

== October ==
=== Autumn International Series ===
Autumn International Series
- Number of teams: 3
- Host countries: France; Ireland; Scotland

The 2011 Autumn International Series was a series of three rugby league test matches played between France, Ireland and Scotland in 2011. It was a similar format to the Rugby League European Cup which was to next be held in 2012. The series included the first test match between Ireland and Scotland since the two teams gained test status.

==== Teams ====
Team	Coach	Captain	RLIF Rank
France	(England) Bobbie Goulding	Olivier Elima	5
Ireland	(England) Mark Aston	Scott Grix	11
Scotland	(England) Steve McCormack	Ian Henderson	10

==== Scotland vs Ireland ====
16 October 2011
2:00pm (BST)

Scotland	26–6	Ireland
Tries: Scott (2), Hurst, J. Barlow, Coupar; Goals: Hurst (1/2), Scott (2/3)	report	Tries: Finn; Goals: Finn (1/1)

Scotstoun Stadium, Glasgow, Scotland

==== France vs Scotland ====
29 October 2011
3:00pm (BST)

France	46–10	Scotland
Tries: Chisholm (3), Baile (2), Duport, Bosc, Pala; Goals: Bosc (7/8)	report	Tries: Arnot, Hellewell; Goals: Scott (1/2)

Stade Gilbert Brutus, Perpignan, France
Attendance: 10,313
Referee: Richard Silverwood (England)

==== Ireland vs France ====
This will be the first international at Thomond Park.

5 November 2011
5:00pm (GMT)

Ireland	16–34	France
	Report

Thomond Park, Limerick, Ireland

=== Friendlies ===
Australia 42–6 New Zealand

Ireland lost to Wales 6–30.

France lost to England 18–32.

France also lost to the England Knights 18–38.

=== Four Nations ===
==== Round 1 ====
28 October 2011
8:00pm (BST)

Australia	26–12	New Zealand
Tries; Matthew Scott (3') 1 Tony Williams (29') 1 Johnathan Thurston (37') 1 Darius Boyd (65') 1 Akuila Uate (77') 1 Goals; Johnathan Thurston 3/5 (4', 30', 66')		Tries; 1 (48') Jason Nightingale; 1 (56') Kalifa Faifai Loa; Goals; 2/2 (49', 52') Benji Marshall

Halliwell Jones Stadium, Warrington, England
Attendance: 12,491
Referee: Phil Bentham
Player of the Match: Sam Thaiday

FB	1	Billy Slater
RW	2	Akuila Uate
RC	3	Willie Tonga
LC	4	Chris Lawrence
LW	5	Darius Boyd
SO	6	Darren Lockyer (c)
SH	7	Johnathan Thurston
PR	8	Paul Gallen
HK	9	Cameron Smith
PR	10	Matthew Scott
SR	11	Luke Lewis
SR	12	Sam Thaiday
LF	13	Anthony Watmough
Substitutions:
BE	14	Cooper Cronk
BE	15	Keith Galloway
BE	16	David Shillington
BE	17	Tony Williams
Coach:
(Australia) Tim Sheens

FB	1	Kevin Locke
RW	2	Kalifa Faifai Loa
RC	3	Lewis Brown
LC	4	Gerard Beale
LW	5	Jason Nightingale
FE	6	Benji Marshall (c)
HB	7	Kieran Foran
PR	8	Ben Matulino
HK	9	Issac Luke
PR	10	Sam McKendry
SR	11	Sika Manu
SR	12	Simon Mannering
LK	13	Jeremy Smith
Substitutions:
BE	14	Thomas Leuluai
BE	15	Fuifui Moimoi
BE	16	Alex Glenn
BE	17	Jared Waerea-Hargreaves
Coach:
(New Zealand) Stephen Kearney

29 October 2011
2:30pm (BST)

England	42–4	Wales
Tries; Sam Tomkins 4 (1', 16', 50', 59'); Kirk Yeaman (22') 1 Jack Reed (54') 1 Chris Heighington (76') 1 Gareth Widdop (80') 1 Goals; 5/8 Kevin Sinfield (17', 51', 60', 77', 80')		Tries; 1 Elliot Kear (66'); Goals

Leigh Sports Village, Leigh, England
Attendance: 10,377
Referee: Henry Perenara
Player of the Match: Sam Tomkins

FB	1	Sam Tomkins
RW	2	Ryan Hall
RC	3	Jack Reed
LC	4	Kirk Yeaman
LW	5	Tom Briscoe
SO	6	Kevin Sinfield
SH	7	Rangi Chase
PR	8	James Graham
HK	9	James Roby
PR	10	Jamie Peacock (c)
SR	11	Gareth Ellis
SR	12	Ben Westwood
LF	13	Chris Heighington
Substitutions:
BE	14	Gareth Widdop
BE	15	Adrian Morley
BE	16	Jamie Jones-Buchanan
BE	17	Jon Wilkin
Coach:
(England) Steve McNamara

FB	1	Danny Jones
RW	2	Elliot Kear
RC	3	Ian Webster
LC	4	Christiaan Roets
LW	5	Rhys Williams
FE	6	Lee Briers (c)
HB	7	Matt Seamark
PR	8	Jordan James
HK	9	Neil Budworth
PR	10	Gil Dudson
SR	11	Tyson Frizell
SR	12	Andy Bracek
LK	13	Ben Flower
Substitutions:
BE	14	Ian Watson
BE	15	Ross Divorty
BE	16	Aled James
BE	17	Craig Kopczak
Coach:
(Wales) Iestyn Harris

==== Round 2 ====
5 November 2011
1:00pm (GMT)

Wales	0–36	New Zealand
		Tries; 2 (20', 32') Sika Manu; 2 (39', 62') Gerard Beale; 1 (5') Jason Nightingale; 1 (13') Kevin Locke; 1 (75') Nathan Fien; Goals; 4/7 Benji Marshall (21', 33', 40', 77')

Wembley Stadium, London, England
Attendance: 42,344
Referee: Matt Cecchin
Player of the Match: Thomas Leuluai

FB	1	Danny Jones
RW	2	Elliot Kear
RC	3	Ian Webster
LC	4	Christiaan Roets
LW	5	Rhys Williams
FE	6	Lee Briers (c)
HB	7	Lloyd White
PR	8	Jordan James
HK	9	Neil Budworth
PR	10	Gil Dudson
SR	11	Tyson Frizell
SR	12	Chris Beasley
LK	13	Ben Flower
Substitutions:
BE	14	Ian Watson
BE	15	Andy Bracek
BE	16	Ross Divorty
BE	17	Craig Kopczak
Coach:
(Wales) Iestyn Harris

FB	1	Kevin Locke
RW	2	Gerard Beale
RC	3	Lewis Brown
LC	4	Alex Glenn
LW	5	Jason Nightingale
FE	6	Benji Marshall (c)
HB	7	Kieran Foran
PR	8	Sam McKendry
HK	9	Thomas Leuluai
PR	10	Ben Matulino
SR	11	Sika Manu
SR	12	Adam Blair
LK	13	Jeremy Smith
Substitutions:
BE	14	Nathan Fien
BE	15	Jared Waerea-Hargreaves
BE	16	Fuifui Moimoi
BE	17	Elijah Taylor
Coach:
(New Zealand) Stephen Kearney

5 November 2011
3:30pm (GMT)

England	20–36	Australia
Tries; Ryan Hall (11', 40') 2 Jack Reed (60') 1 Chris Heighington (77') 1 Goals; Kevin Sinfield 2/4 (62', 77')		Tries; 1 (17') Luke Lewis; 1 (30') Tony Williams; 1 (44') Greg Inglis; 1 (53') Paul Gallen; 1 (73') Darius Boyd; 1 (79') Chris Lawrence; Goals; 6/6 Johnathan Thurston (19', 32', 45', 55', 74', 80')

Wembley Stadium, London, England
Attendance: 42,344
Referee: Henry Perenara
Player of the Match: Johnathan Thurston

FB	1	Sam Tomkins
RW	2	Ryan Hall
RC	3	Jack Reed
LC	4	Kirk Yeaman
LW	5	Tom Briscoe
SO	6	Kevin Sinfield
SH	7	Rangi Chase
PR	8	James Graham
HK	9	James Roby
PR	10	Jamie Peacock (c)
SR	11	Gareth Ellis
SR	12	Ben Westwood
LF	13	Chris Heighington
Substitutions:
BE	14	Gareth Widdop
BE	15	Adrian Morley
BE	16	Jamie Jones-Buchanan
BE	17	Jon Wilkin
Coach:
(England) Steve McNamara

FB	1	Billy Slater
RW	2	Akuila Uate
RC	3	Chris Lawrence
LC	4	Greg Inglis
LW	5	Darius Boyd
SO	6	Darren Lockyer (c)
SH	7	Johnathan Thurston
PR	8	Paul Gallen
HK	9	Cameron Smith
PR	10	Matthew Scott
SR	11	Luke Lewis
SR	12	Sam Thaiday
LF	13	Anthony Watmough
Substitutions:
BE	14	Cooper Cronk
BE	15	Keith Galloway
BE	16	David Shillington
BE	17	Tony Williams
Coach:
(Australia) Tim Sheens

==== Round 3 ====
12 November 2011
06.00pm (GMT)

England	28–6	New Zealand
Tries; Tom Briscoe; Ryan Hall; James Graham; Sam Tomkins; Goals; Kevin Sinfield 6/6		Tries; Jason Nightingale; Goals; Benji Marshall 1/1

KC Stadium, Hull, England
Attendance: 23,447
Player of the Match: Kevin Sinfield

FB	1	Sam Tomkins
RW	2	Ryan Hall
RC	3	Jack Reed
LC	4	Kirk Yeaman
LW	5	Tom Briscoe
SO	6	Kevin Sinfield
SH	7	Rangi Chase
PR	8	James Graham
HK	9	James Roby
PR	10	Jamie Peacock (c)
SR	11	Jon Wilkin
SR	12	Ben Westwood
LF	13	Chris Heighington
Substitutions:
BE	14	Gareth Widdop
BE	15	Adrian Morley
BE	16	Jamie Jones-Buchanan
BE	17	Garreth Carvell
Coach:
(England) Steve McNamara

FB	1	Kevin Locke
RW	2	Gerard Beale
RC	3	Lewis Brown
LC	4	Simon Mannering
LW	5	Jason Nightingale
FE	6	Benji Marshall (c)
HB	7	Kieran Foran
PR	8	Ben Matulino
HK	9	Thomas Leuluai
PR	17	Russell Packer
SR	11	Sika Manu
SR	12	Adam Blair
LK	13	Jeremy Smith
Substitutions:
BE	12	Alex Glenn
BE	14	Issac Luke
BE	16	Jared Waerea-Hargreaves
BE	18	Elijah Taylor
Coach:
(New Zealand) Stephen Kearney

13 November 2011
5:45pm (GMT)

Wales	14–56	Australia
Tries; Rhys Williams (10') 1 Elliot Kear (14') 1 Jordan James (49') 1 Goals; Lee Briers 1/3 (51')		Tries; 3 (38', 40', 69') Cooper Cronk; 1 (25') Cameron Smith; 1 (41') Daly Cherry-Evans; 1 (45') Darius Boyd; 1 (59') Johnathan Thurston; 1 (63') Greg Inglis; 1 (66') Jharal Yow Yeh; 1 (73') Josh Morris; Goals; 8/9 (26', 39', 40', 42', 47', 60', 64', 70') Johnathan Thurston

Racecourse Ground, Wrexham, Wales
Attendance: 5,233
Player of the Match: Darius Boyd

FB	1	Danny Jones
RW	2	Elliot Kear
RC	3	Ian Webster
LC	4	Christiaan Roets
LW	5	Rhys Williams
FE	6	Lee Briers (c)
HB	7	Lloyd White
PR	8	Jordan James
HK	9	Neil Budworth
PR	10	Craig Kopczak
SR	11	Chris Beasley
SR	12	Andy Bracek
LK	13	Ben Flower
Substitutions:
BE	14	Mark Lennon
BE	15	Ross Divorty
BE	16	Aled James
BE	17	Gil Dudson
Coach:
(Wales) Iestyn Harris

FB	1	Darius Boyd
RW	2	Josh Morris
RC	3	Greg Inglis
LC	4	Chris Lawrence
LW	5	Jharal Yow Yeh
SO	6	Cooper Cronk
SH	7	Johnathan Thurston
PR	8	Keith Galloway
HK	9	Cameron Smith (c)
PR	10	David Shillington
SR	15	Anthony Watmough
SR	12	Beau Scott
LF	13	Corey Parker
Substitutions:
BE	14	Daly Cherry-Evans
BE	16	Paul Gallen
BE	17	Matthew Scott
BE	18	Sam Thaiday
Coach:
(Australia) Tim Sheens

==== Standings ====
2011 Four Nations
Pos	Team	Pld	W	D	L	PF	PA	PD	Pts	Qualification
1	Australia	3	3	0	0	118	46	+72	6	Qualification for Final
2	England	3	2	0	1	90	46	+44	4	Qualification for Final
3	New Zealand	3	1	0	2	54	54	0	2	
4	Wales	3	0	0	3	18	134	−116	0	

Source: Gillette Four Nations

==== Final ====
Saturday, 19 November
6:00pm (GMT)

England	8–30	Australia
Tries; 1 (36') Ryan Hall; Goals; 2/2 (38', 52') Kevin Sinfield		Sam Thaiday (4') 1 Jharal Yow Yeh (57') 1 Johnathan Thurston (63') 1 Greg Inglis (69') 1 Darren Lockyer (80') 1 Goals; Johnathan Thurston 5/5 (6', 40', 59', 64', 70'); Darren Lockyer 0/1

Elland Road, Leeds, England
Attendance: 34,174
Referee: (Australia) Matt Cecchin
Player of the Match: Johnathan Thurston

England	Position	Australia
Sam Tomkins	FB	Darius Boyd
Ryan Hall	WG	Akuila Uate
Jack Reed	CE	Greg Inglis
Kirk Yeaman	CE	Chris Lawrence
Tom Briscoe	WG	Jharal Yow Yeh
Kevin Sinfield	FE	Darren Lockyer (c)
Rangi Chase	HB	Johnathan Thurston
James Graham	PR	Matthew Scott
James Roby	HK	Cameron Smith
Jamie Peacock (c)	PR	David Shillington
Jon Wilkin	SR	Luke Lewis
Gareth Ellis	SR	Sam Thaiday
Ben Westwood	LK	Paul Gallen
Gareth Widdop	Int	Anthony Watmough
Adrian Morley	Int	Cooper Cronk
Jamie Jones-Buchanan	Int	Keith Galloway
Garreth Carvell	Int	Tony Williams
