= 2011 Rugby League Four Nations =

2011 Four Nations
- Number of teams: 4
- Host countries: England; Wales
- Winner: Australia
- Matches played: 7
- Attendance: 128,065 (18,295 per match)
- Points scored: 280 (40 per match)
- Tries scored: 47 (6.71 per match)
- Top scorer: (Australia) Johnathan Thurston (56)
- Top try scorer: (England) Sam Tomkins (5)

The 2011 Rugby League Four Nations tournament (also known as the 2011 Gillette Rugby League Four Nations due to sponsorship by Gillette), was the third staging of the Rugby League Four Nations tournament, and was played in England and Wales during October and November 2011. It was contested by regular contestants Australia, England and New Zealand, in addition to Wales, who had qualified for their first Four Nations by winning the 2010 European Cup. The tournament saw the return of international rugby league to London's Wembley Stadium for the first time since 1997, with a double-header played on 5 November 2011. Australia won the tournament, defeating England in the final at Elland Road, Leeds, on 19 November 2011. The match was the last of the 17-year professional career of Australia's captain Darren Lockyer.

== History ==
The 2011 tournament was the third of three Four Nations series planned before the 2013 Rugby League World Cup, with the venues rotating between Europe and the South Pacific. There was no Four Nations in 2012 due to teams preparing for the World Cup.

In addition to automatic inclusions Australia, England and New Zealand, Wales qualified for the tournament by defeating France in the final of the 2010 European Cup.

== Teams ==
Team	Coach	Captain	RLIF Rank
Australia	Tim Sheens	Darren Lockyer	1
England	Steve McNamara	Jamie Peacock	3
New Zealand	Stephen Kearney	Benji Marshall	2
Wales	Iestyn Harris	Lee Briers	5

== Squads ==
=== Australia ===
Australian coach Tim Sheens' touring squad was announced on 3 October: Of the twenty four players, twenty three were Australian born while one was Fijian born.

No.	Name	State	Club
661	Darren Lockyer (c)	QLD	Brisbane Broncos
715	Luke Lewis	NSW	Penrith Panthers
724	Willie Tonga^{1}	QLD	North Queensland Cowboys
731	Johnathan Thurston	QLD	North Queensland Cowboys
737	Greg Inglis	QLD	South Sydney Rabbitohs
738	Cameron Smith (vc)	QLD	Melbourne Storm
739	Sam Thaiday	QLD	Brisbane Broncos
744	Cooper Cronk	QLD	Melbourne Storm
750	Paul Gallen	NSW	Cronulla-Sutherland Sharks
751	Billy Slater	QLD	Melbourne Storm
758	Anthony Watmough	NSW	Manly-Warringah Sea Eagles
761	Darius Boyd	QLD	St. George Illawarra Dragons
764	Robbie Farah	NSW	Wests Tigers
765	David Shillington	QLD	Canberra Raiders
767	Josh Morris^{2}	NSW	Canterbury-Bankstown Bulldogs
?	Jharal Yow Yeh	QLD	Brisbane Broncos
?	Corey Parker	QLD	Brisbane Broncos
?	Daly Cherry-Evans	QLD	Manly-Warringah Sea Eagles
?	Tony Williams	NSW	Manly-Warringah Sea Eagles
?	Akuila Uate	NSW	Newcastle Knights
?	Matthew Scott	QLD	North Queensland Cowboys
?	Beau Scott^{3}	NSW	St. George Illawarra Dragons
?	Chris Lawrence	NSW	Wests Tigers
?	Keith Galloway	NSW	Wests Tigers

^{1} Replaced originally selected Brett Stewart who withdrew due to injury.

^{2} Replaced originally selected David Taylor who withdrew due to injury.

^{3} Replaced originally selected Glenn Stewart who withdrew for compassionate reasons.

=== England ===
The England squad for the 2011 Four Nations: Of the twenty four players, twenty two were English born while one was New Zealand born and one Australian born.

Coach: (England) Steve McNamara

Club Team	Players
(Australia) Brisbane Broncos	Jack Reed
(England) Castleford	Rangi Chase
(England) Huddersfield	Leroy Cudjoe
(England) Hull F.C.	Tom Briscoe, Kirk Yeaman
(England) Leeds	Carl Ablett, Ryan Bailey, Ryan Hall, Ben Jones-Bishop, Danny McGuire, Jamie Jones-Buchanan, Jamie Peacock(C), Kevin Sinfield
(Australia) Melbourne Storm	Gareth Widdop
(England) St. Helens	James Graham, James Roby, Jon Wilkin
(England) Warrington	Garreth Carvell, Adrian Morley, Ben Westwood
(Australia) Wests Tigers	Gareth Ellis, Chris Heighington
(England) Wigan	Michael McIlorum, Sam Tomkins

=== New Zealand ===
The Kiwis announced their 23-man touring squad on 4 October. Of the twenty three players, eighteen were New Zealand born while four were Australian born and one Tongan born.

Coach: (New Zealand) Stephen Kearney

Club Team	Players
(Australia) Brisbane Broncos	Gerard Beale, Alex Glenn
(Australia) Cronulla Sharks	Jeremy Smith
(Australia) Manly-Warringah Sea Eagles	Kieran Foran
(Australia) Melbourne Storm	Adam Blair, Sika Manu, Kevin Proctor
New Zealand Warriors	Lewis Brown, Kevin Locke, Simon Mannering, Ben Matulino, Russell Packer, Bill Tupou^{1}, Elijah Taylor^{3}
(Australia) North Queensland Cowboys	Kalifa Faifai Loa^{2}
(Australia) Parramatta Eels	Fuifui Moimoi
(Australia) Penrith Panthers	Sam McKendry
(Australia) St George Illawarra Dragons	Jason Nightingale, Nathan Fien
(Australia) South Sydney Rabbitohs	Issac Luke
(Australia) Sydney Roosters	Jared Waerea-Hargreaves
(Australia) Wests Tigers	Benji Marshall
(England) Wigan	Thomas Leuluai

^{1} Replaced original replacement Krisnan Inu who withdrew for family reasons. He replaced originally selected Steve Matai who withdrew due to injury.

^{2} Replaced originally selected Manu Vatuvei who withdrew due to injury.

^{3} Replaced originally selected Shaun Johnson who withdrew due to injury.

=== Wales ===
The Welsh training squad was named on 14 September. Of the twenty three players, nine were English born while eight were Welsh born and five Australian borns and one South African born.

Coach: (Wales) Iestyn Harris

Club Team	Players
(England) Bradford	Craig Kopczak
(Australia) Burleigh Bears	Mark Lennon
(Australia) Central Comets	Chris Beasley, Ian Webster
(Australia) Cronulla Sharks	Tyson Frizell
(Wales) Crusaders	Andy Bracek, Gil Dudson, Ben Flower, Jordan James, Elliot Kear, Peter Lupton, Lloyd White, Lee Williams
(England) Featherstone Rovers	Ross Divorty
(England) Halifax	Danny Jones
(Australia) Mackay Cutters	Neil Budworth
South Wales Scorpions	Andrew Gay, Aled James, Christiaan Roets
(England) Swinton	Ian Watson
(England) Warrington	Lee Briers, Rhys Williams
(Australia) Wynnum Manly Seagulls	Matt Seamark

Gareth Thomas was originally selected in the squad, but retired with immediate effect in the week leading up to the tournament.

== Venues ==
The games were played at venues in England and Wales. The tournament final was played in Leeds.

Warrington	Leigh	London
Halliwell Jones Stadium	Leigh Sports Village	Wembley
Capacity: 13,200	Capacity: 11,000	Capacity: 90,000
Hull	Wrexham	Leeds
KC Stadium	Racecourse Ground	Elland Road
Capacity: 25,400	Capacity: 15,771	Capacity: 37,890

== Officiating ==
=== Referees ===
- (England) Phil Bentham
- (Australia) Matt Cecchin
- (New Zealand) Henry Perenara

=== Touch judges ===
- (Australia) Paul Holland (TJ)
- (New Zealand) Shane Rehm (TJ)
- (England) James Child (TJ)

=== Video Referees ===
- (England) Ian Smith
- (England) Ben Thaler

== Pre-tournament matches ==
Before the series, England played a Test match against France, New Zealand and Australia played a test in Newcastle before heading to Great Britain, and Wales played Ireland in Neath.

New Zealand were originally scheduled to play a Test match against the Cook Islands on 7 October, however this was called off due to the unavailability of 29 frontline players.

=== Australia vs New Zealand ===
16 October 2011
4:00pm (AEDT)

Australia	42–6	New Zealand
Tries; Uate (3', 7') 2 Boyd (13', 70') 2 Lawrence (20', 34') 2 Galloway (63') 1 Tonga (68') 1 Goals; Thurston 4/7 (9', 15', 21, 72'); C Smith (64') 1/1	Match details	Tries; 1 (56') Locke; Goals; 1/1 (57') Luke

Ausgrid Stadium, Newcastle, Australia
Attendance: 32,890
Referee: Phil Bentham

FB	1	Billy Slater
RW	2	Akuila Uate
RC	3	Willie Tonga
LC	4	Chris Lawrence
LW	5	Darius Boyd
SO	6	Darren Lockyer (c)
SH	7	Johnathan Thurston
PR	8	Paul Gallen
HK	9	Cameron Smith
PR	10	Matthew Scott
SR	11	Luke Lewis
SR	12	Sam Thaiday
LF	13	Anthony Watmough
Substitutions:
BE	14	Cooper Cronk
BE	15	Keith Galloway
BE	16	David Shillington
BE	17	Tony Williams
Coach:
(Australia) Tim Sheens

FB	1	Kevin Locke
RW	2	Kalifa Faifai Loa
RC	3	Lewis Brown
LC	4	Gerard Beale
LW	5	Jason Nightingale
FE	6	Benji Marshall (c)
HB	7	Kieran Foran
PR	8	Russell Packer
HK	9	Nathan Fien
PR	10	Sam McKendry
SR	11	Alex Glenn
SR	12	Simon Mannering
LK	13	Jeremy Smith
Substitutions:
BE	14	Issac Luke
BE	15	Fuifui Moimoi
BE	16	Sika Manu
BE	17	Jared Waerea-Hargreaves
Coach:
(New Zealand) Stephen Kearney

=== France vs England ===
21 October 2011
8:45pm (CET)

France	18–32	England
Tries; Elima (17') 1 Pélissier (71') 1 Duport (74') 1 Goals; Bosc (17', 71', 74') 3/3	Match details	Tries; 2 (34', 50') Briscoe; 1 (2') Hall; 1 (30') Yeaman; 1 (39') Roby; 1 (68') Reed; Goals; 4/6 (30', 39', 50', 68') Sinfield

Parc des Sports, Avignon, France
Attendance: 16,866
Referee: Matt Cecchin

FB	1	Cyril Stacul
RW	2	Vincent Duport
RC	3	Jean-Philippe Baile
LC	4	Mathias Pala
LW	5	Frédéric Vaccari
SO	6	Thomas Bosc
SH	7	Dane Chisholm
PR	8	David Ferriol
HK	9	Gregory Mounis
PR	10	Rémi Casty
SR	11	Olivier Elima (c)
SR	12	Cyril Gossard
LF	13	Jason Baitieri
Substitutions:
BE	14	Éloi Pélissier
BE	15	Jamal Fakir
BE	16	Sebastien Raguin
BE	17	Mickaël Simon
Coach:
(England) Bobbie Goulding

FB	1	Sam Tomkins
RW	2	Ryan Hall
RC	3	Jack Reed
LC	4	Kirk Yeaman
LW	5	Tom Briscoe
SO	6	Kevin Sinfield
SH	7	Rangi Chase
PR	8	Jamie Peacock (c)
HK	9	James Roby
PR	10	James Graham
SR	11	Gareth Ellis
SR	12	Ben Westwood
LF	13	Chris Heighington
Substitutions:
BE	14	Gareth Widdop
BE	15	Adrian Morley
BE	16	Jamie Jones-Buchanan
BE	17	Jon Wilkin
Coach:
(England) Steve McNamara

=== Wales vs Ireland ===
22 October 2011
6:00pm (GMT)

Wales	30–6	Ireland
Tries: Gay (2') 1 Roets (27') 1 Frizell (30') 1 Lennon (42') 1 Kear (45') 1 James (70') 1 Goals: Webster (27', 42', 70') 3/5; White 0/1	Match details	Tries: 1 (77') Bergin; Goals: 1/1 (77') Finn

The Gnoll, Neath, Wales
Attendance: 2,265
Referee: Thierry Alibert

== Results ==
=== Round 1 ===
28 October 2011
8:00pm (BST)

Australia	26–12	New Zealand
Tries; Matthew Scott (3') 1 Tony Williams (29') 1 Johnathan Thurston (37') 1 Darius Boyd (65') 1 Akuila Uate (77') 1 Goals; Johnathan Thurston 3/5 (4', 30', 66')		Tries; 1 (48') Jason Nightingale; 1 (56') Kalifa Faifai Loa; Goals; 2/2 (49', 52') Benji Marshall

Halliwell Jones Stadium, Warrington, England
Attendance: 12,491
Referee: Phil Bentham
Player of the Match: Sam Thaiday

FB	1	Billy Slater
RW	2	Akuila Uate
RC	3	Willie Tonga
LC	4	Chris Lawrence
LW	5	Darius Boyd
SO	6	Darren Lockyer (c)
SH	7	Johnathan Thurston
PR	8	Paul Gallen
HK	9	Cameron Smith
PR	10	Matthew Scott
SR	11	Luke Lewis
SR	12	Sam Thaiday
LF	13	Anthony Watmough
Substitutions:
BE	14	Cooper Cronk
BE	15	Keith Galloway
BE	16	David Shillington
BE	17	Tony Williams
Coach:
(Australia) Tim Sheens

FB	1	Kevin Locke
RW	2	Kalifa Faifai Loa
RC	3	Lewis Brown
LC	4	Gerard Beale
LW	5	Jason Nightingale
FE	6	Benji Marshall (c)
HB	7	Kieran Foran
PR	8	Ben Matulino
HK	9	Issac Luke
PR	10	Sam McKendry
SR	11	Sika Manu
SR	12	Simon Mannering
LK	13	Jeremy Smith
Substitutions:
BE	14	Thomas Leuluai
BE	15	Fuifui Moimoi
BE	16	Alex Glenn
BE	17	Jared Waerea-Hargreaves
Coach:
(New Zealand) Stephen Kearney

29 October 2011
2:30pm (BST)

England	42–4	Wales
Tries; Sam Tomkins 4 (1', 16', 50', 59'); Kirk Yeaman (22') 1 Jack Reed (54') 1 Chris Heighington (76') 1 Gareth Widdop (80') 1 Goals; 5/8 Kevin Sinfield (17', 51', 60', 77', 80')		Tries; 1 Elliot Kear (66'); Goals

Leigh Sports Village, Leigh, England
Attendance: 10,377
Referee: Henry Perenara
Player of the Match: Sam Tomkins

FB	1	Sam Tomkins
RW	2	Ryan Hall
RC	3	Jack Reed
LC	4	Kirk Yeaman
LW	5	Tom Briscoe
SO	6	Kevin Sinfield
SH	7	Rangi Chase
PR	8	James Graham
HK	9	James Roby
PR	10	Jamie Peacock (c)
SR	11	Gareth Ellis
SR	12	Ben Westwood
LF	13	Chris Heighington
Substitutions:
BE	14	Gareth Widdop
BE	15	Adrian Morley
BE	16	Jamie Jones-Buchanan
BE	17	Jon Wilkin
Coach:
(England) Steve McNamara

FB	1	Danny Jones
RW	2	Elliot Kear
RC	3	Ian Webster
LC	4	Christiaan Roets
LW	5	Rhys Williams
FE	6	Lee Briers (c)
HB	7	Matt Seamark
PR	8	Jordan James
HK	9	Neil Budworth
PR	10	Gil Dudson
SR	11	Tyson Frizell
SR	12	Andy Bracek
LK	13	Ben Flower
Substitutions:
BE	14	Ian Watson
BE	15	Ross Divorty
BE	16	Aled James
BE	17	Craig Kopczak
Coach:
(Wales) Iestyn Harris

=== Round 2 ===
5 November 2011
1:00pm (GMT)

Wales	0–36	New Zealand
		Tries; 2 (20', 32') Sika Manu; 2 (39', 62') Gerard Beale; 1 (5') Jason Nightingale; 1 (13') Kevin Locke; 1 (75') Nathan Fien; Goals; 4/7 Benji Marshall (21', 33', 40', 77')

Wembley Stadium, London, England
Attendance: 42,344
Referee: Matt Cecchin
Player of the Match: Thomas Leuluai

FB	1	Danny Jones
RW	2	Elliot Kear
RC	3	Ian Webster
LC	4	Christiaan Roets
LW	5	Rhys Williams
FE	6	Lee Briers (c)
HB	7	Lloyd White
PR	8	Jordan James
HK	9	Neil Budworth
PR	10	Gil Dudson
SR	11	Tyson Frizell
SR	12	Chris Beasley
LK	13	Ben Flower
Substitutions:
BE	14	Ian Watson
BE	15	Andy Bracek
BE	16	Ross Divorty
BE	17	Craig Kopczak
Coach:
(Wales) Iestyn Harris

FB	1	Kevin Locke
RW	2	Gerard Beale
RC	3	Lewis Brown
LC	4	Alex Glenn
LW	5	Jason Nightingale
FE	6	Benji Marshall (c)
HB	7	Kieran Foran
PR	8	Sam McKendry
HK	9	Thomas Leuluai
PR	10	Ben Matulino
SR	11	Sika Manu
SR	12	Adam Blair
LK	13	Jeremy Smith
Substitutions:
BE	14	Nathan Fien
BE	15	Jared Waerea-Hargreaves
BE	16	Fuifui Moimoi
BE	17	Elijah Taylor
Coach:
(New Zealand) Stephen Kearney

5 November 2011
3:30pm (GMT)

England	20–36	Australia
Tries; Ryan Hall (11', 40') 2 Jack Reed (60') 1 Chris Heighington (77') 1 Goals; Kevin Sinfield 2/4 (62', 77')		Tries; 1 (17') Luke Lewis; 1 (30') Tony Williams; 1 (44') Greg Inglis; 1 (53') Paul Gallen; 1 (73') Darius Boyd; 1 (79') Chris Lawrence; Goals; 6/6 Johnathan Thurston (19', 32', 45', 55', 74', 80')

Wembley Stadium, London, England
Attendance: 42,344
Referee: Henry Perenara
Player of the Match: Johnathan Thurston

FB	1	Sam Tomkins
RW	2	Ryan Hall
RC	3	Jack Reed
LC	4	Kirk Yeaman
LW	5	Tom Briscoe
SO	6	Kevin Sinfield
SH	7	Rangi Chase
PR	8	James Graham
HK	9	James Roby
PR	10	Jamie Peacock (c)
SR	11	Gareth Ellis
SR	12	Ben Westwood
LF	13	Chris Heighington
Substitutions:
BE	14	Gareth Widdop
BE	15	Adrian Morley
BE	16	Jamie Jones-Buchanan
BE	17	Jon Wilkin
Coach:
(England) Steve McNamara

FB	1	Billy Slater
RW	2	Akuila Uate
RC	3	Chris Lawrence
LC	4	Greg Inglis
LW	5	Darius Boyd
SO	6	Darren Lockyer (c)
SH	7	Johnathan Thurston
PR	8	Paul Gallen
HK	9	Cameron Smith
PR	10	Matthew Scott
SR	11	Luke Lewis
SR	12	Sam Thaiday
LF	13	Anthony Watmough
Substitutions:
BE	14	Cooper Cronk
BE	15	Keith Galloway
BE	16	David Shillington
BE	17	Tony Williams
Coach:
(Australia) Tim Sheens

=== Round 3 ===
12 November 2011
06.00pm (GMT)

England	28–6	New Zealand
Tries; Tom Briscoe; Ryan Hall; James Graham; Sam Tomkins; Goals; Kevin Sinfield 6/6		Tries; Jason Nightingale; Goals; Benji Marshall 1/1

KC Stadium, Hull, England
Attendance: 23,447
Player of the Match: Kevin Sinfield

FB	1	Sam Tomkins
RW	2	Ryan Hall
RC	3	Jack Reed
LC	4	Kirk Yeaman
LW	5	Tom Briscoe
SO	6	Kevin Sinfield
SH	7	Rangi Chase
PR	8	James Graham
HK	9	James Roby
PR	10	Jamie Peacock (c)
SR	11	Jon Wilkin
SR	12	Ben Westwood
LF	13	Chris Heighington
Substitutions:
BE	14	Gareth Widdop
BE	15	Adrian Morley
BE	16	Jamie Jones-Buchanan
BE	17	Garreth Carvell
Coach:
(England) Steve McNamara

FB	1	Kevin Locke
RW	2	Gerard Beale
RC	3	Lewis Brown
LC	4	Simon Mannering
LW	5	Jason Nightingale
FE	6	Benji Marshall (c)
HB	7	Kieran Foran
PR	8	Ben Matulino
HK	9	Thomas Leuluai
PR	17	Russell Packer
SR	11	Sika Manu
SR	12	Adam Blair
LK	13	Jeremy Smith
Substitutions:
BE	12	Alex Glenn
BE	14	Issac Luke
BE	16	Jared Waerea-Hargreaves
BE	18	Elijah Taylor
Coach:
(New Zealand) Stephen Kearney

13 November 2011
5:45pm (GMT)

Wales	14–56	Australia
Tries; Rhys Williams (10') 1 Elliot Kear (14') 1 Jordan James (49') 1 Goals; Lee Briers 1/3 (51')		Tries; 3 (38', 40', 69') Cooper Cronk; 1 (25') Cameron Smith; 1 (41') Daly Cherry-Evans; 1 (45') Darius Boyd; 1 (59') Johnathan Thurston; 1 (63') Greg Inglis; 1 (66') Jharal Yow Yeh; 1 (73') Josh Morris; Goals; 8/9 (26', 39', 40', 42', 47', 60', 64', 70') Johnathan Thurston

Racecourse Ground, Wrexham, Wales
Attendance: 5,233
Player of the Match: Darius Boyd

FB	1	Danny Jones
RW	2	Elliot Kear
RC	3	Ian Webster
LC	4	Christiaan Roets
LW	5	Rhys Williams
FE	6	Lee Briers (c)
HB	7	Lloyd White
PR	8	Jordan James
HK	9	Neil Budworth
PR	10	Craig Kopczak
SR	11	Chris Beasley
SR	12	Andy Bracek
LK	13	Ben Flower
Substitutions:
BE	14	Mark Lennon
BE	15	Ross Divorty
BE	16	Aled James
BE	17	Gil Dudson
Coach:
(Wales) Iestyn Harris

FB	1	Darius Boyd
RW	2	Josh Morris
RC	3	Greg Inglis
LC	4	Chris Lawrence
LW	5	Jharal Yow Yeh
SO	6	Cooper Cronk
SH	7	Johnathan Thurston
PR	8	Keith Galloway
HK	9	Cameron Smith (c)
PR	10	David Shillington
SR	15	Anthony Watmough
SR	12	Beau Scott
LF	13	Corey Parker
Substitutions:
BE	14	Daly Cherry-Evans
BE	16	Paul Gallen
BE	17	Matthew Scott
BE	18	Sam Thaiday
Coach:
(Australia) Tim Sheens

=== Standings ===
2011 Four Nations
Pos	Team	Pld	W	D	L	PF	PA	PD	Pts	Qualification
1	Australia	3	3	0	0	118	46	+72	6	Qualification for Final
2	England	3	2	0	1	90	46	+44	4	Qualification for Final
3	New Zealand	3	1	0	2	54	54	0	2	
4	Wales	3	0	0	3	18	134	−116	0	

Source: Gillette Four Nations

=== Final ===
Saturday, 19 November
6:00pm (GMT)

England	8–30	Australia
Tries; 1 (36') Ryan Hall; Goals; 2/2 (38', 52') Kevin Sinfield		Sam Thaiday (4') 1 Jharal Yow Yeh (57') 1 Johnathan Thurston (63') 1 Greg Inglis (69') 1 Darren Lockyer (80') 1 Goals; Johnathan Thurston 5/5 (6', 40', 59', 64', 70'); Darren Lockyer 0/1

Elland Road, Leeds, England
Attendance: 34,174
Referee: (Australia) Matt Cecchin
Player of the Match: Johnathan Thurston

England	Position	Australia
Sam Tomkins	FB	Darius Boyd
Ryan Hall	WG	Akuila Uate
Jack Reed	CE	Greg Inglis
Kirk Yeaman	CE	Chris Lawrence
Tom Briscoe	WG	Jharal Yow Yeh
Kevin Sinfield	FE	Darren Lockyer (c)
Rangi Chase	HB	Johnathan Thurston
James Graham	PR	Matthew Scott
James Roby	HK	Cameron Smith
Jamie Peacock (c)	PR	David Shillington
Jon Wilkin	SR	Luke Lewis
Gareth Ellis	SR	Sam Thaiday
Ben Westwood	LK	Paul Gallen
Gareth Widdop	Int	Anthony Watmough
Adrian Morley	Int	Cooper Cronk
Jamie Jones-Buchanan	Int	Keith Galloway
Garreth Carvell	Int	Tony Williams

== Statistics ==
=== Top pointscorers ===
2011 Four Nations top pointscorers
	Player	Team	T	G	FG	Pts
1	Johnathan Thurston	Australia	3	22	0	56
2	Kevin Sinfield	England	0	15	0	30
3	Sam Tomkins	England	5	0	0	20
4	Ryan Hall	England	4	0	0	16
5	Benji Marshall	New Zealand	0	7	0	14

Johnathan Thurston broke the record for most points in a single tournament with his 56-point haul. The previous record of 42 was set in 2005 by New Zealand's Stacey Jones.
