= Matt Seamark =

Wales international rugby league footballer

Personal information
- Born: 18 March 1987 (age 39) Townsville, Australia
- Height: 174 cm (5 ft 9 in)
- Weight: 82 kg (12 st 13 lb)

Playing information
- Position: Scrum-half
Club
Years	Team	Pld	T	G	FG	P
20??–18	Wynnum Manly Seagulls
Representative
Years	Team	Pld	T	G	FG	P
2011–17	Wales	6	0	3	0	6
- Source: As of 5 December 2017

Matt Seamark (born 18 March 1987) is a Wales international rugby league footballer. He represented Wales in the 2011 Four Nations.

== Background ==
Seamark was born in Townsville, Queensland, Australia.

== Playing career ==
He plays for the Wynnum Manly Seagulls in the Queensland Cup. The Seagulls won the Cup in 2011.

Seamark qualified for the Welsh team due to a Welsh grandma and was called up for the 2011 Four Nations. He made his test début against Ireland on 22 October 2011.
