= Keith Galloway =

Australia international rugby league footballer

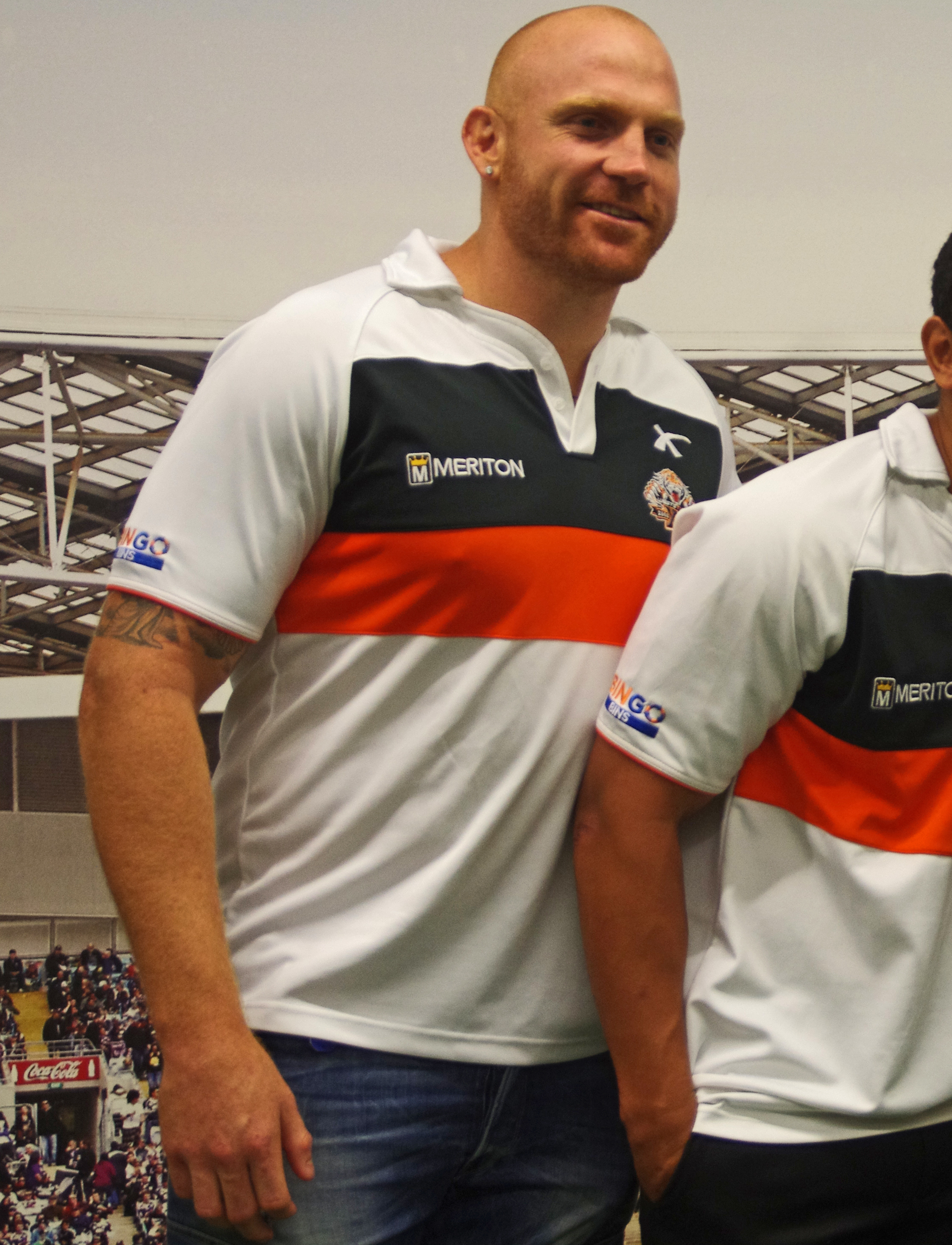

Personal information
- Full name: Keith Joseph Galloway
- Born: 2 September 1985 (age 41) Sydney, New South Wales, Australia

Playing information
- Height: 195 cm (6 ft 5 in)
- Weight: 119 kg (18 st 10 lb)
- Position: Prop
Club
Years	Team	Pld	T	G	FG	P
2003–05	Cronulla Sharks	37	4	0	0	16
2006–15	Wests Tigers	173	6	0	0	24
2016–18	Leeds Rhinos	42	2	0	0	8
	Total	252	12	0	0	48
Representative
Years	Team	Pld	T	G	FG	P
2009–11	City Origin	3	0	0	0	0
2011	New South Wales	1	0	0	0	0
2011	Australia	5	1	0	0	4

Keith Galloway (born 2 September 1985) is an Australian former professional rugby league footballer who played as a prop in the 2000s and 2010s.

He played for the Cronulla-Sutherland Sharks and the Wests Tigers in the NRL, and the Leeds Rhinos in the Super League. Galloway played for City Origin, New South Wales in the State of Origin series and Australia at international level. He was known for his size and power.

== Background ==
Galloway was born in Sydney, New South Wales, Australia. He is of Scottish descent.

== Biography ==
While attending Marist College Kogarah, Galloway played for the NSW under 17s and 19s and then Australian Schoolboys team in 2002. Galloway played junior football with the Brighton Seagulls in the St George District, then Mascot Juniors in the South Sydney Juniors before being enticed to switch to the Yarrawarrah Tigers by mentor Robert Stone as a teenager.

=== Playing career ===
==== Cronulla-Sutherland Sharks ====
Galloway made his NRL début for the Cronulla-Sutherland Sharks in 2003 while still attending high school, a few months before his 18th birthday. He made 8 appearances from the bench in the second half of the 2003 season, scoring a try in his second match.

Starting the 2004 season on the bench, Galloway scored the Sharks' sole try in the opening game of the season, a 6–12 loss to Wests Tigers. He played in 14 games for the season, including some mid-season appearances in the starting side in the second-row.

Galloway was on the receiving end of a John Hopoate leaping elbow charge in 2005, leaving the 19-year-old unconscious on the field. The event led to a 17-week suspension for Hopoate. He was again a regular on the bench for the Sharks, but in the qualifying final match against St. George Dragons he was promoted to starting prop, in what was his last game for the club.

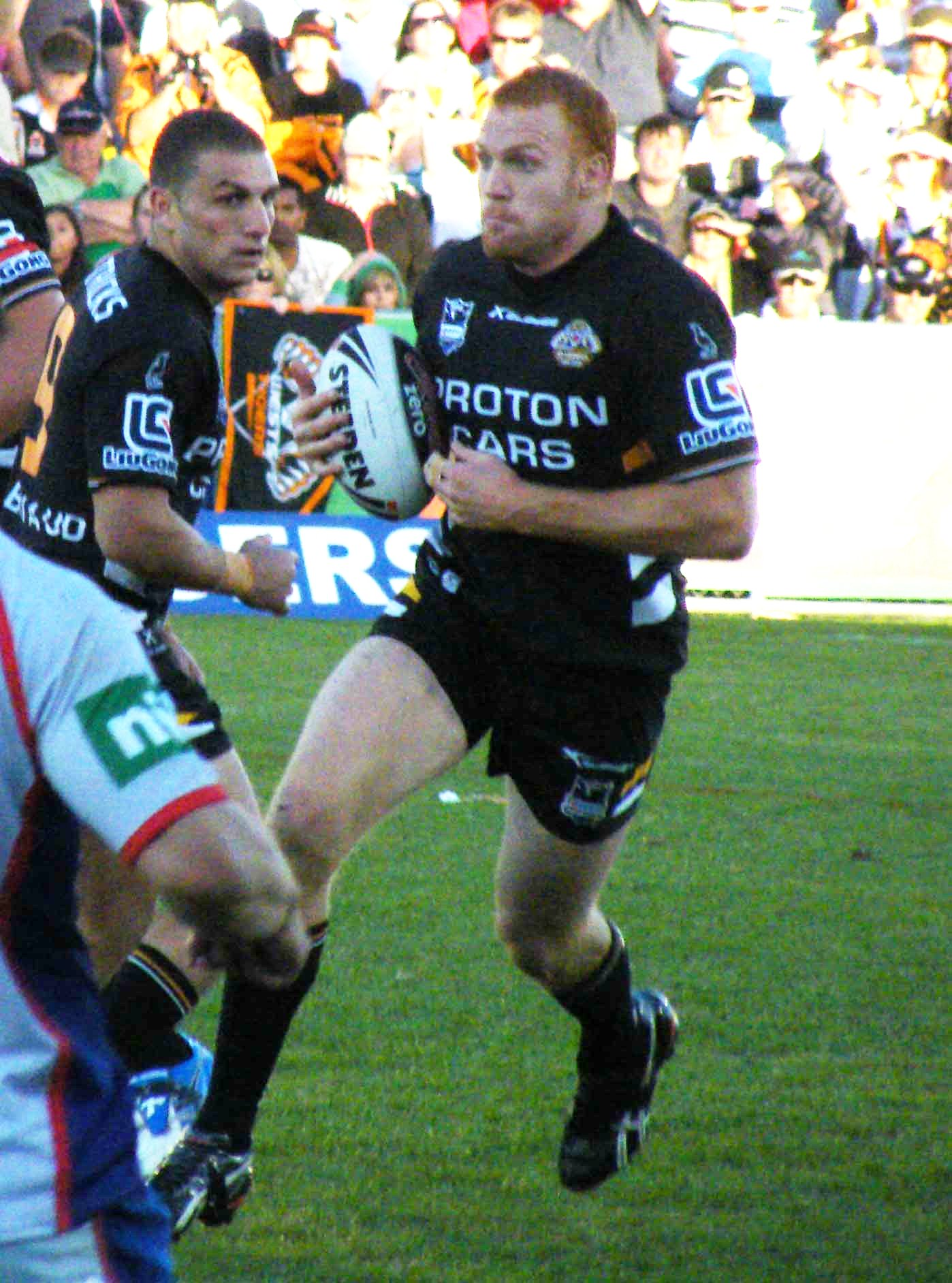
Galloway playing for Wests in 2009

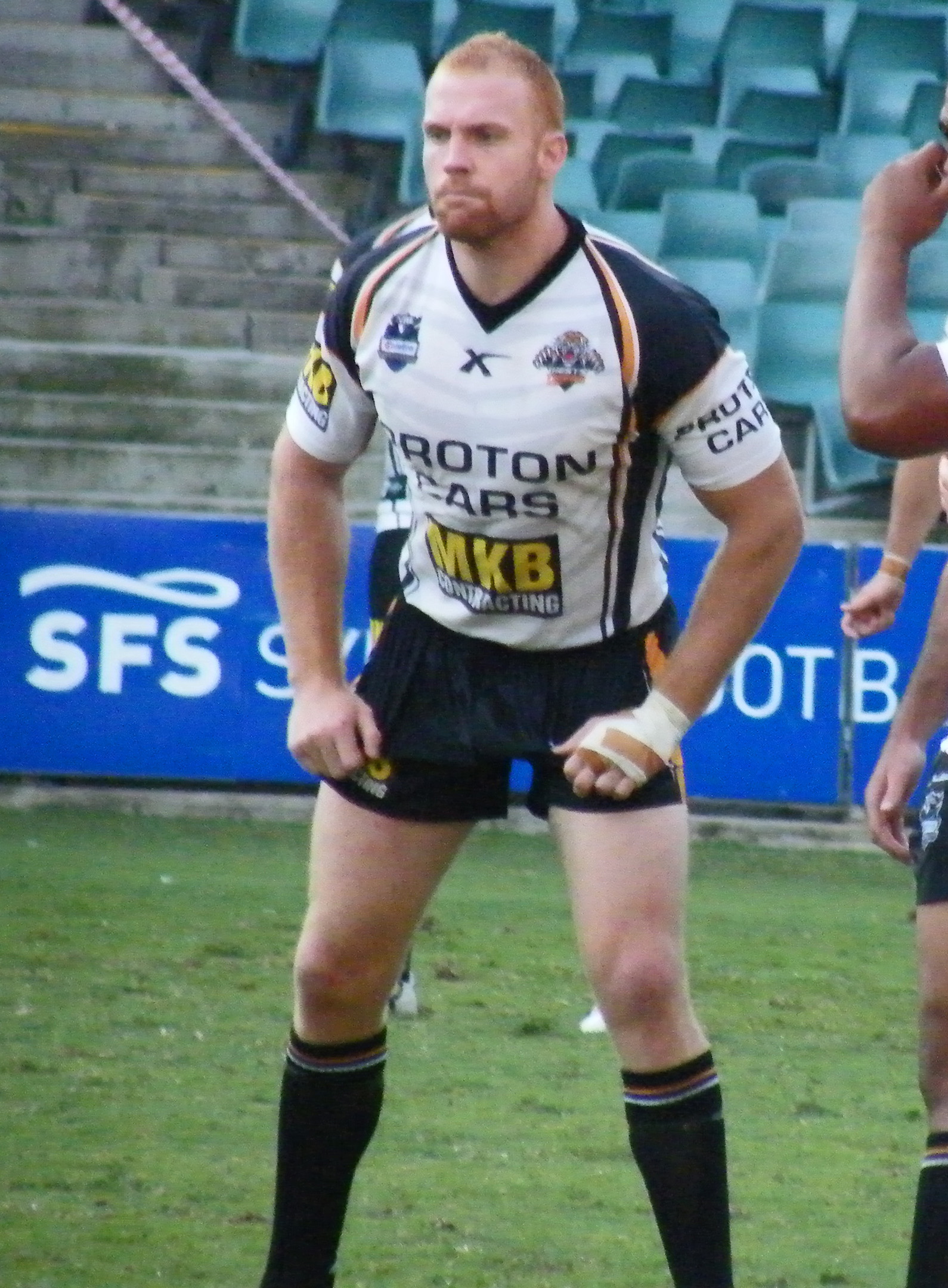
Galloway in 2010

==== Wests Tigers ====
===== 2006–2011 =====
Galloway joined the Wests Tigers in 2006, having signed with them halfway through the 2005 season. He said, "I'd played with a few of those boys with schoolboys and junior rep teams. It was a really young squad then. I thought it would probably be a good opportunity to grow with this team." He played 12 games in his first season, mostly off the bench, failing to score a try. In 2006, he spent more time as the starting prop and made 17 appearances. He scored his first try for the club in round 3 against Parramatta.

He was named in the Scotland training squad for the 2008 Rugby League World Cup.

He was selected for City in the City vs Country match on 8 May 2009. Before the 2009 State of Origin series Galloway was named in the 40 man New South Wales preliminary squad but was ultimately not available for selection due to injury. Later that year he was named in Australia's Four-Nations train-on squad. He was also picked for the Prime Minister's XIII to play Papua New Guinea, but had to withdraw due to an injury to his left knee.

In 2010, he signed a contract to remain at the club until the end of the 2013 season.

In 2011, Galloway made his State of Origin début, coming off the bench in game 3 of the series, but had little time on the field. At the end of the season, Galloway became the first Wests Tigers' prop to be chosen in an Australian squad. He said of the selection, "I'm super stoked to be there. I was happy with my form this year, I didn't have many injuries and I got through 23 games, which is the most I've played. Consistency-wise it was my best year."

Galloway made his test début against New Zealand, coming off the bench to score a try in the second half, in a game won easily by Australia. He later said, "I just ran off Billy Slater. I didn't have to run far for the try." He went on to play in all four of Australia's Four Nations matches. He was awarded the Noel Kelly Medal for Best Forward at the Wests Tigers for the year.

===== 2012–15 =====
Injuries hampered Galloway's chances of playing representative football in 2012. He made 18 appearances for the Wests Tigers throughout the season, with the club losing every game that he was unable to play in.

A torn pectoral muscle in the round two game saw Galloway miss seventeen weeks of football in 2013, playing just 9 games. In July, he re-signed with the club for another three seasons. Coach Mick Potter said, "Keith consistently makes the most metres which gives the team that much needed go forward. He definitely has a presence on the field, being a big man he stops people on contact." Galloway was expected to play for Scotland in the 2013 World Cup, but withdrew with after sustaining a stress facture in his foot in Wests last game for the season.

Galloway played in 22 games in 2015, the most appearances he had made in a regular season. In round 7 against the Canberra Raiders, he scored his first try since the middle of 2012. He made 502 tackles for the year and averaged over a hundred metres per game with the ball. In round 25, with Wests Tigers well ahead on the scoreboard and regular time over, Galloway attempted his first conversion, which narrowly missed. Galloway said, "I didn't want to do it, but everyone in the team egged me on to do it. Obviously I'm not a goal-kicker. I sort of knew it was my last home game but it probably didn't hit me until we were out there. I've had a great 10 years – I really enjoyed it."

==== Leeds Rhinos ====
On 24 July 2015, Keith signed a three-year contract to play for the Super League heavyweights the Leeds Rhinos beginning in the 2016 season.

After travelling to the UK, Galloway said that he intended to represent Scotland in 2016 Four Nations, and would have liked to have played for them in the past if not for injuries. He said, "My father came over to Australia when he was in his 20s. I'm Australian but I'm proud of my Scottish ancestry and it would mean a lot to my family and myself if I could pull on that jersey."

== Career highlights ==
- First Grade Debut: 2003 – Round 19, Cronulla v New Zealand Warriors at Toyota Park, Sydney, 19 July.
- NSW City Origin Debut: 2009 – NSW City Origin v NSW Country Origin, Wade Park, Orange, New South Wales, 8 May.
- NSW City Origin Selection: 2009–2011
- New South Wales Debut: 2011 State of Origin series Game 3, New South Wales v Queensland, Suncorp Stadium, Brisbane, 6 July.
- Australia Test Debut: 2011 – Australia v New Zealand, Newcastle International Sports Centre, Newcastle, 16 October.
- Australia Test Squad Selection: 2011
- Super League Champion 2017

== Post playing ==
In 2018, Galloway was made a life member of the Wests Tigers. In 2023, Galloway made a cameo appearance in Lickerish.

== Statistics ==
Year	Team	Games	Tries	Pts
2003	Cronulla-Sutherland Sharks	8	1	4
2004	Cronulla-Sutherland Sharks	14	1	4
2005	Cronulla-Sutherland Sharks	15	2	8
2006	Wests Tigers	12		
2007	Wests Tigers	17	1	4
2008	Wests Tigers	18		
2009	Wests Tigers	15	1	4
2010	Wests Tigers	20	1	4
2011	Wests Tigers	23	1	4
2012	Wests Tigers	18	1	4
2013	Wests Tigers	9		
2014	Wests Tigers	19		
2015	Wests Tigers	22	1	4
2016	Leeds Rhinos	30	1	4
2017	Leeds Rhinos	13	1	4
	Totals	252	12	48
