= David Shillington =

Australia international rugby league footballer

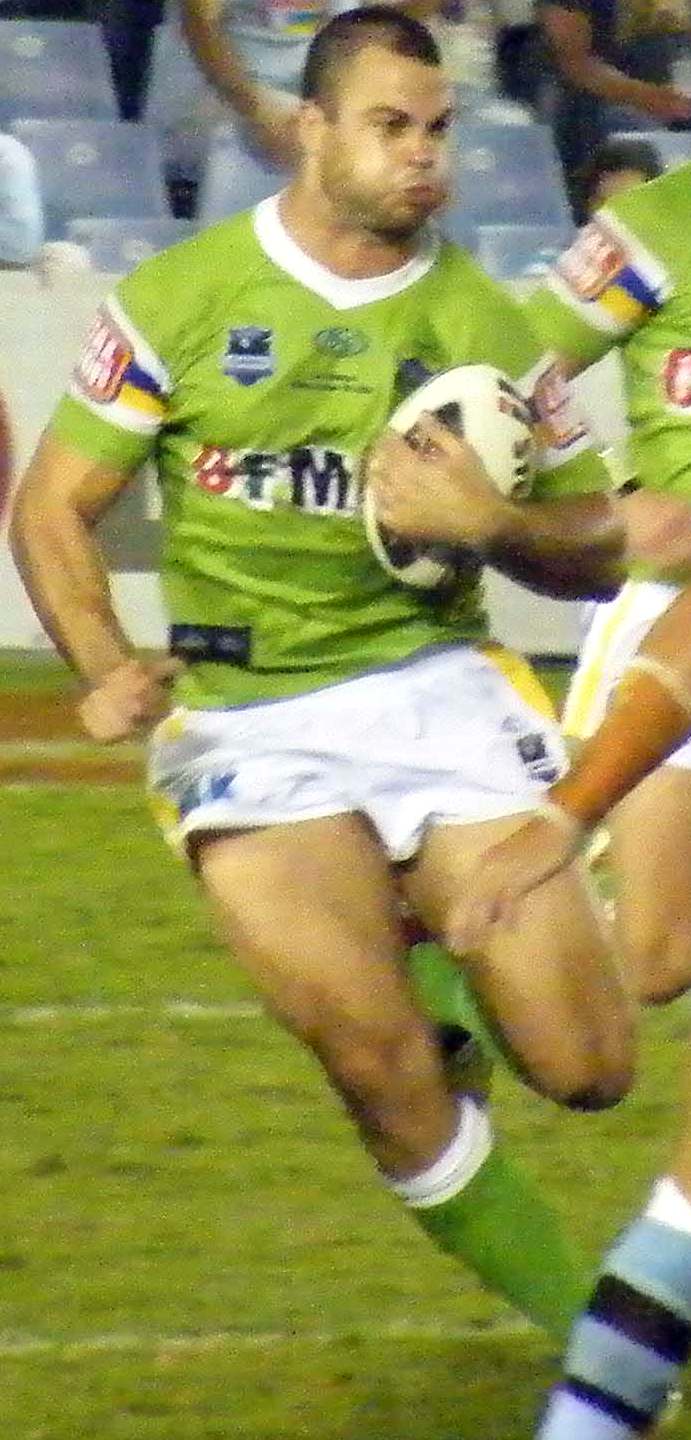

Personal information
- Born: 24 June 1983 (age 43) Brisbane, Queensland, Australia
- Height: 194 cm (6 ft 4 in)
- Weight: 111 kg (17 st 7 lb)

Playing information
- Position: Prop
Club
Years	Team	Pld	T	G	FG	P
2005–08	Sydney Roosters	73	5	0	0	20
2009–15	Canberra Raiders	131	5	0	0	20
2016	Gold Coast Titans	11	1	0	0	4
	Total	215	11	0	0	44
Representative
Years	Team	Pld	T	G	FG	P
2009–13	Queensland	8	0	0	0	0
2009–12	Australia	14	0	0	0	0
2009–13	Prime Minister's XIII	4	2	0	0	8
2010	NRL All Stars	1	0	0	0	0
- Source: As of 20 March 2016

David Shillington (born 24 June 1983 in Brisbane, Queensland) is an Australian former professional rugby league footballer who last played for the Gold Coast Titans in the National Rugby League. A Queensland State of Origin and Australian international representative prop forward, he previously played for the Sydney Roosters and Canberra Raiders. Shillington also works as a columnist for The Canberra Times.

== Early and personal life ==
Shillington has two older brothers and a younger brother. He attended Padua College, Brisbane. Shillington played his junior rugby league for the Brisbane Brothers.

== Playing career ==
=== Sydney Roosters ===
He started his NRL career playing for the Sydney Roosters from 2005 until 2008. He was thought to be eligible to represent France for the 2008 Rugby League World Cup.

Shillington signed a 4-year deal with the Canberra Raiders starting in 2009.

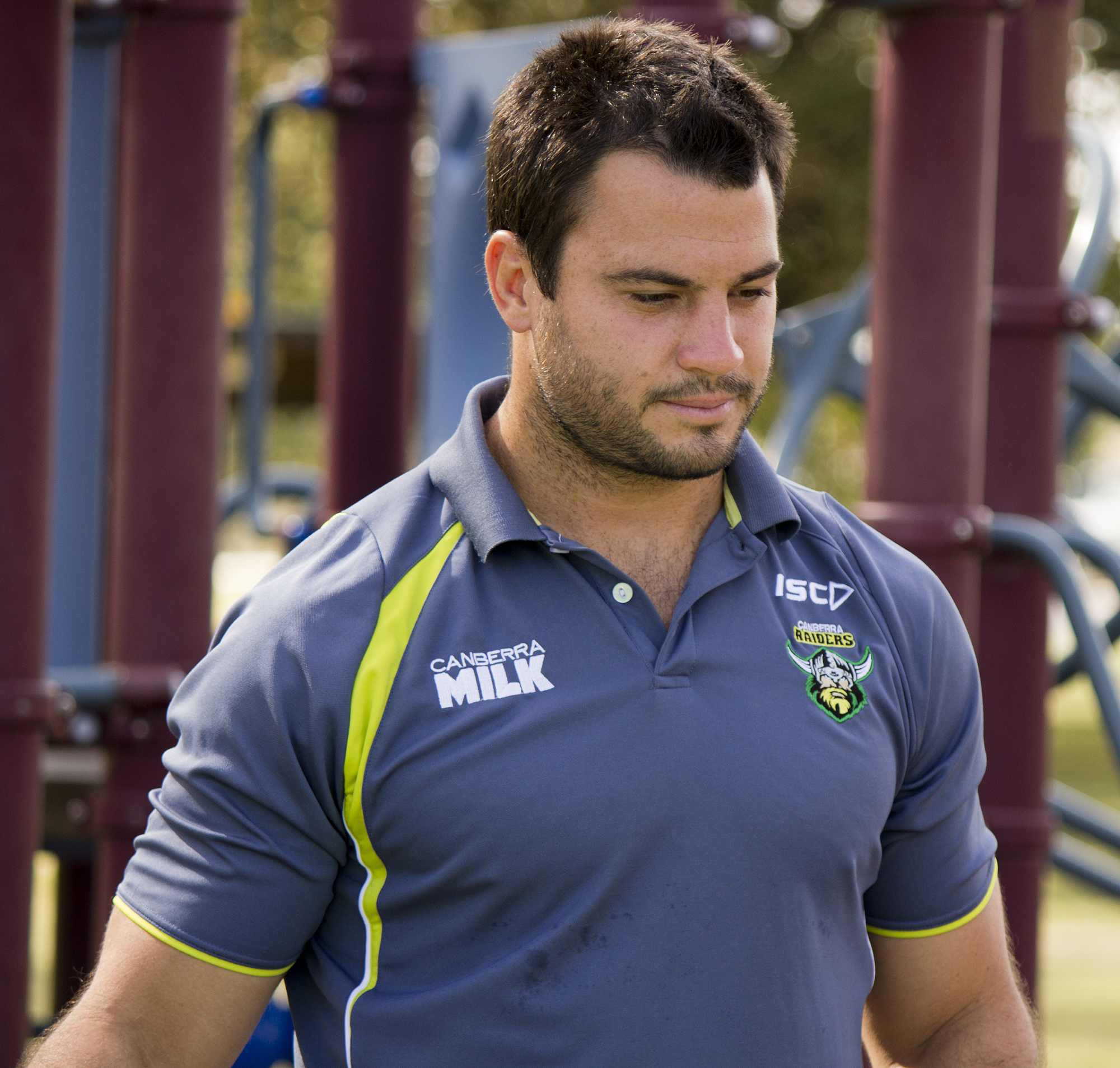
Shillington in 2012

=== Canberra Raiders ===
In April 2009, he was named in the preliminary 25-man squad to represent Queensland in the opening State of Origin match for 2009. He did not make an appearance for the Maroons until the 3rd game of the series though. At the end of the 2009 season Shillington was selected as part of the Australian squad that travelled to Europe for the 2009 Four Nations tournament. He made his debut against England. 2009.

For the 2010 ANZAC Test, Shillington was selected to play for Australia as a prop forward in their victory against New Zealand. Shillington was named the winner of the Mal Meninga Medal as the Raiders' player of the year for 2010.

In 2011, Shillington was picked in the Australia V New Zealand test played in Newcastle playing off the Bench, before heading to Great Britain for the 2011 Four Nations tournament in England and Wales. For the first two games (VS New Zealand & England), Shillington played off the bench wearing the number 16, but in the game VS Wales, he will start at prop (number 8). When Australia played New Zealand in England, Isaac Luke (New Zealand hooker) came in late on Shillington's legs which looked like it would end his Four Nations tournament. He was in doubt played against England at Wembley but did play.

For the 2013 State of Origin series Shillington was selected to play in Game I, but after the Blues' win was not retained for Game II.

=== Gold Coast Titans and retirement ===
On 25 June 2015, Shillington signed a 2-year contract with the Gold Coast Titans starting in 2016. Shillington announced his immediate retirement from rugby league on 9 February 2017 due to chronic injuries.

== Post playing ==
As of 2018, Shillington was the Queensland manager of the Men in League Foundation.
