= Matt Cecchin =

Australian rugby league referee

Personal information
- Born: 1973 (age 52–53)

Refereeing information
Years	Competition	Apps
2001–21	National Rugby League	300
2010	City vs Country Origin	1
2011–17	Internationals	12
2012–17	State of Origin	4
2018	Super League	1
- Source: As of 11 February 2018

Matt Cecchin (born 1973) is an Australian former rugby league referee who officiated in the NRL between 2001 and 2021. Cecchin officiated international matches at the 2011 Four Nations and 2017 World Cup, and domestic representative matches in all three games of the 2017 State of Origin series.

== Referee career ==
Cecchin began his career by overseeing Metro Cup matches. He made his first grade debut when he took over from an injured Steve Clark at halftime of a New Zealand Warriors and Northern Eagles match on 1 June 2001. His first full first grade match was on 14 July 2001, when he officiated a match between the Wests Tigers and North Queensland. He controlled 22 matches between 2001 and 2004. In 2003, he was told the only way he would remain an official was to become a touch judge.

Cecchin returned to first grade in 2008 and has been in charge of finals matches since 2009. He controlled the 2011 NRL Grand Final alongside Tony Archer.

Cecchin was appointed to control the 2010 City vs Country Origin match and refereed in the 2011 Four Nations. He controlled one match during the 2012 State of Origin series.

He was awarded his second Grand Final appointment 2016 NRL Grand Final as lead referee along with assistant Ben Cummins. He was appointed lead referee for Game I of the 2017 State of Origin series.

In February 2018, Cecchin refereed one Super League match when Wigan Warriors took their home game against Hull F.C. to WIN Stadium in Wollongong, Australia.

== Personal life ==
Cecchin's father played reserve grade for the Newtown Jets.

In 2012, Cecchin revealed he was gay, becoming the first NRL official or player since Ian Roberts in 1995 to do so.

Cecchin has revealed having panic attacks before a match. He is a mental health ambassador for rugby league.
