= Darius Boyd =

Australia international rugby league footballer

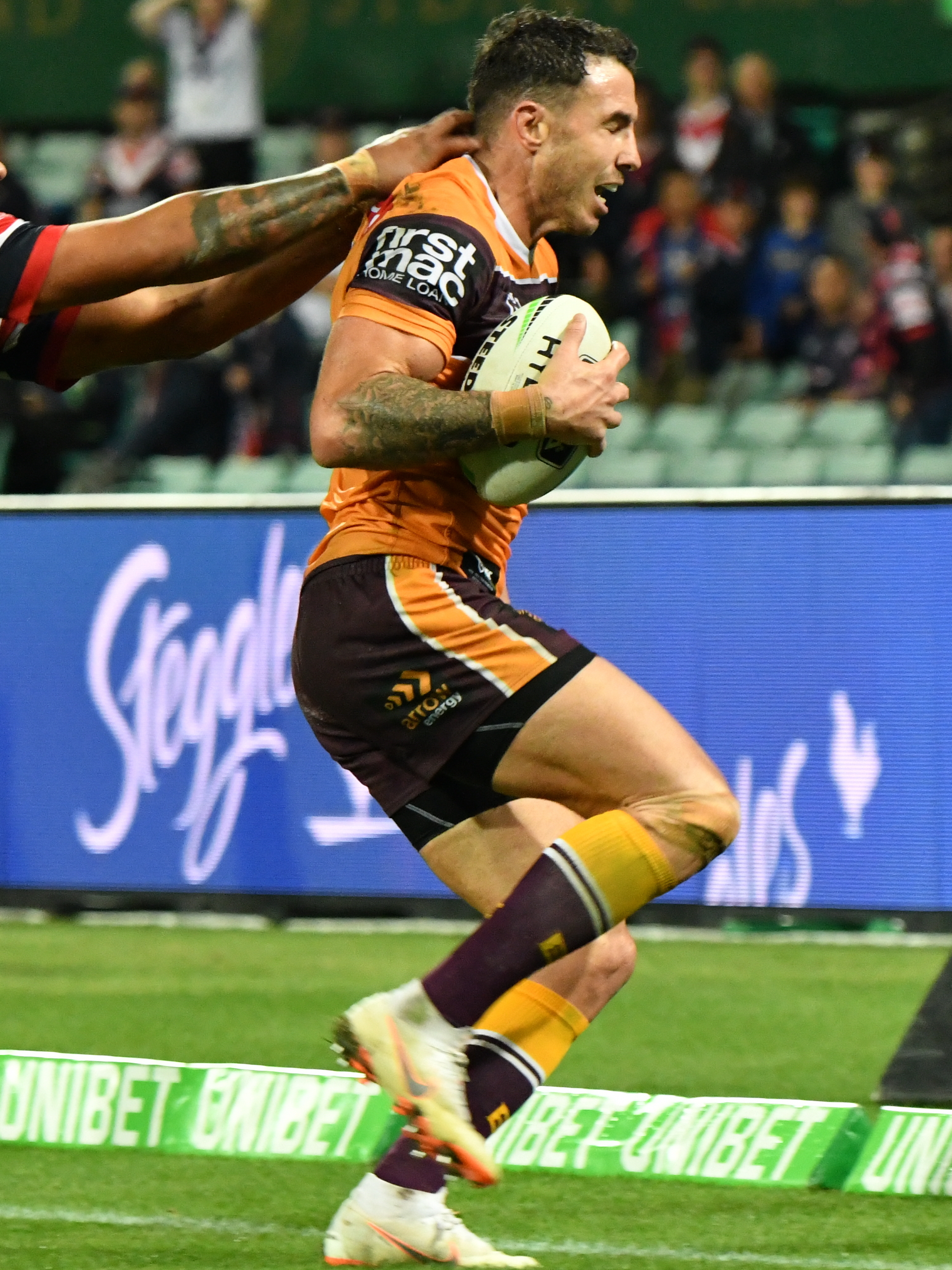

Personal information
- Full name: Darius Boyd
- Born: 17 July 1987 (age 39) Gold Coast, Queensland, Australia

Playing information
- Height: 184 cm (6 ft 0 in)
- Weight: 93 kg (14 st 9 lb)
- Position: Fullback, Wing, Centre
Club
Years	Team	Pld	T	G	FG	P
2006–08	Brisbane Broncos	74	32	0	0	128
2009–11	St. George Illawarra	70	13	0	0	52
2012–14	Newcastle Knights	62	17	0	0	68
2015–20	Brisbane Broncos	135	26	0	0	104
	Total	341	88	0	0	352
Representative
Years	Team	Pld	T	G	FG	P
2008–17	Queensland	28	17	0	0	68
2008–17	Australia	23	16	0	0	64
2012	Prime Minister's XIII	1	0	0	0	0

Coaching information
Representative
Years	Team	Gms	W	D	L	W%
2027–	Queensland	0	0	0	0

Darius Boyd (born 17 July 1987) is an Australian professional rugby league coach and former player who is the current coach of Queensland in the State of Origin series. He last played as a fullback for the Brisbane Broncos in the National Rugby League (NRL) and represented Queensland and Australia. Boyd captained the Brisbane Broncos from 2017 to 2019.

Boyd previously played for the St. George Illawarra Dragons in 2009–2011 and the Newcastle Knights in 2012–2014 all under coach Wayne Bennett before switching back to Broncos in 2015. Boyd has won the 2006 NRL Grand Final with the Broncos and the 2010 NRL Grand Final with the Dragons. He is a Queensland State of Origin and Prime Minister's XIII representative. Boyd also played as a winger and centre, with the majority of his representative games played on the left wing. Boyd also played as a five-eighth in 2019 for the Broncos.

== Early life ==
Boyd was born at the Gold Coast Hospital, in Queensland, Australia on 17 July 1987. He was raised by his single mother throughout most of his childhood.

He began playing junior football at a young age for the Parkwood Sharks, which led to playing at halftime during a Gold Coast Seagulls match in 1993. He later switched clubs to the Mudgeeraba Redbacks. Boyd attended Robina State High School during this time but switched schools to the famed rugby league nursery, Palm Beach Currumbin High School, in Year 10. It was at this point Boyd's mother became ill and he started living with his grandmother, as well as spending periods of time living with football friends' families. Following graduation in 2004, he was not recruited by any NRL teams and decided to repeat Year 12 at PBC in the hope of garnering attention from NRL teams. The decision turned out to be a fruitful one with the Brisbane Broncos offering Boyd a scholarship, followed by a $20,000 contract for the 2006 NRL season. Boyd was questioned by police in 2009 relating to an alleged sexual assault in a Brisbane nightclub.

== Playing career ==
In 2005, while playing for Palm Beach Currumbin, Boyd was selected at fullback for the Australian Schoolboys team. He then debuted for the Burleigh Bears in the Queensland Cup. After playing for Burleigh, Boyd was signed by the Brisbane Broncos. He later said, "I was a bit scared of leaving home as an 18-year-old but Brisbane was always my favourite club since I was a little fella. I had to move into the Broncos' house and was a pretty shy, quiet kid so didn't want to leave the family and different things but after a week or two they made me feel welcome."

=== 2006 ===
In round 1, Boyd made his NRL debut for the Broncos, against the North Queensland Cowboys, scoring a try on debut in the Broncos 36–4 loss at Suncorp Stadium. Playing on the wing for the majority of the season, Boyd got a chance at his preferred position of fullback for a number of games after the regular fullback, Karmichael Hunt, went down with injuries. At the end of the regular season, Boyd won the Broncos' Rookie of the Year award. Boyd played on the wing for the Broncos in their 2006 NRL Grand Final 15–8 win over the Melbourne Storm. Boyd played in 27 matches and scored 11 tries in an impressive debut year in the NRL.

=== 2007 ===
As 2006 NRL Premiers, the Brisbane Broncos travelled to England to face 2006 Super League champions, St Helens R.F.C., in the 2007 World Club Challenge. Boyd scored a try in the Broncos' 18–14 loss. Boyd finished the 2007 NRL season with him playing in 22 matches and scoring 7 tries.

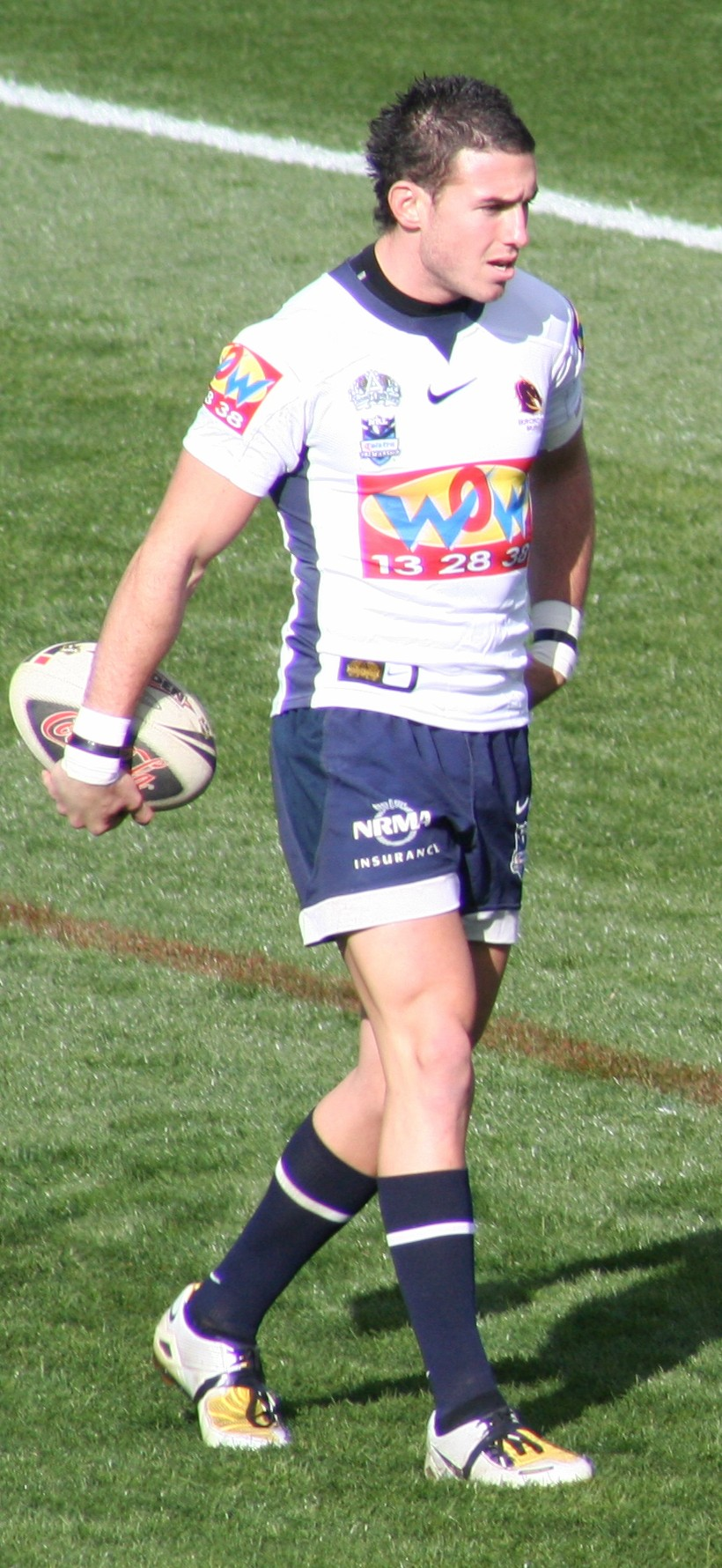
Boyd while playing for the Broncos in 2008

=== 2008 ===
In Round 1 against the Penrith Panthers, Boyd scored a hat-trick in the Broncos 48–12 win at Suncorp Stadium. In May 2008, Boyd started to receive attention from other clubs as he was off-contract at the end of the year. There was speculation that he would move to the Canterbury-Bankstown Bulldogs, alongside fellow Broncos Michael Ennis and Ben Hannant, or possibly the St. George Illawarra Dragons, following his coach at Brisbane, Wayne Bennett. After leading the NRL try-scoring table for most of the first half of the season, Boyd was selected for the Queensland team to play New South Wales in Game 2 of the 2008 State of Origin series due to teammate Justin Hodges suspension. Boyd scored 2 tries on debut, both from passes from centre Greg Inglis, with Queensland winning 30–0 at Suncorp Stadium Boyd also played in Game 3 as the Maroons won 16–10 at ANZ Stadium and won the series 2–1. On 20 August 2008, Boyd signed a 3-year contract with the Dragons starting in 2009, following teammate Nick Emmett and coach Wayne Bennett. Boyd finished the 2008 NRL season with him playing in 24 matches and scoring 13 tries. On 16 October 2008, Boyd was called up to the Australian 2008 World Cup squad due to teammate Justin Hodges being ruled out with a shoulder injury. On 9 November 2008, Boyd made his international debut for Australia against Papua New Guinea, playing on the wing in the 46–6 win at 1300SMILES Stadium. Boyd only played in 1 match in the World Cup tournament.

=== 2009 ===
In Round 1 of the 2009 NRL season, Boyd made his club debut for the St George Illawarra Dragons against the Melbourne Storm, playing at fullback in the 17–16 loss at Olympic Park. In Round 4, he travelled to Brisbane for his and Wayne Bennett's first match against their old club, which the Dragons won 25–12, ending the Broncos unbeaten start to the season. On 8 May, Boyd played for Australia in the Anzac Test, playing on the wing and scoring a try in the 38–10. Boyd was selected in the Queensland squad for the 2009 State of Origin series, playing in all 3 matches and scoring 1 try in the record-breaking 4th consecutive series win. In Round 20 against the New Zealand Warriors, Boyd scored his first try as a Dragon in the 29–4 win at Mt Smart Stadium. In August, Boyd's performance at a press conference, in which the 22-year-old fullback delivered one-sentence responses to eight questions posed to him at a training session in Wollongong, drew an apology to journalists from Dragons coach Wayne Bennett. Boyd finished his first year with the Dragons with 2 tries in 22 matches.

=== 2010 ===
In Round 5 against his former team the Brisbane Broncos, Boyd played his 100th career match in the Dragons 34–16 win and was named Man of the Match at WIN Stadium. In Round 7, Boyd received the inaugural "Spirit of ANZAC Medal" as Man of the Match in the annual ANZAC Day Cup in the Dragons 28–6 win against the Sydney Roosters at Sydney Football Stadium. Boyd played on the wing for Queensland in all three matches of the 2010 State of Origin series, scoring a try in each match to become the series' top try-scorer. Towards the end of the season, Boyd was one of the favourites for the Dally M Medal, having had a sizeable lead in points over the previous year's winner Jarryd Hayne and Sydney Roosters player Todd Carney when voting went behind closed doors after Round 16. He ended up finishing third, 2 points behind eventual winner Todd Carney and 1 point behind Wests Tigers hooker Robbie Farah. On 3 October 2010, Boyd played in the Dragons 2010 NRL Grand Final against the Sydney Roosters, playing at fullback in the Dragons 32–8 win and was awarded the Clive Churchill Medal as man of the match. Boyd finished his successful 2010 NRL season with him playing in 25 matches and scoring 2 tries. After the 2010 season, Boyd suggested that he may leave the Dragons if head coach Wayne Bennett did so. On 4 October 2010, Boyd was selected in the Australia Kangaroos 24-man squad for the 2010 Four Nations. Boyd only played in 1 match, playing against New Zealand, playing at fullback and scoring a try in the 34–20 win at Eden Park. Boyd won the 2010 RLIF Fullback of the Year award in the off-season.

=== 2011 ===
Boyd played in the Dragons Charity Shield 32–10 win over the South Sydney Rabbitohs, scoring a try while playing at five-eighth. Boyd also played in the Dragons' 2011 World Club Challenge against the Wigan Warriors, playing at fullback in the 21–15 win at DW Stadium. In Round 1 against the Gold Coast Titans, Boyd equalled his 2009 and 2010 efforts with a double in the Dragons 25–16 win at Robina Stadium. On 30 March 2011, Wayne Bennett announced he would not coach the Dragons in 2012, hinting that Boyd may leave the club as well. After Bennett signed a 4-year contract with the Newcastle Knights, Boyd was offered contracts from the Knights and the Gold Coast Titans. On 9 May 2011, the Titans officially withdrew their offer. On 9 June 2011, Boyd signed a 4-year contract with the Newcastle Knights starting in 2012. Boyd played in all three matches of the 2011 State of Origin series in the Maroons 6th consecutive series win. Boyd's final game for the Dragons was against his former club, the Brisbane Broncos at Suncorp Stadium. Boyd scored the try that forced golden point for the Dragons, after they were down 12–6, but the Dragons ultimately lost the match 13–12, after his test, state and former club captain, Darren Lockyer kicked the winning field goal. Boyd finished the 2011 NRL season with him playing in 22 matches and scoring 9 tries. On 16 October 2011, Boyd scored 2 tries for Australia in the 42-6 test match win against New Zealand at Hunter Stadium. Boyd was selected in the Australian squad for the 2011 Four Nations tournament held in the United Kingdom. Boyd played all 4 matches and scoring 3 triesincluding playing at fullback in the Kangaroos 30-8 Four Nations Final win against England at Elland Road.

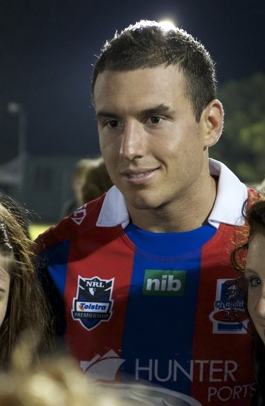
Boyd while playing for the Knights in 2012

=== 2012 ===
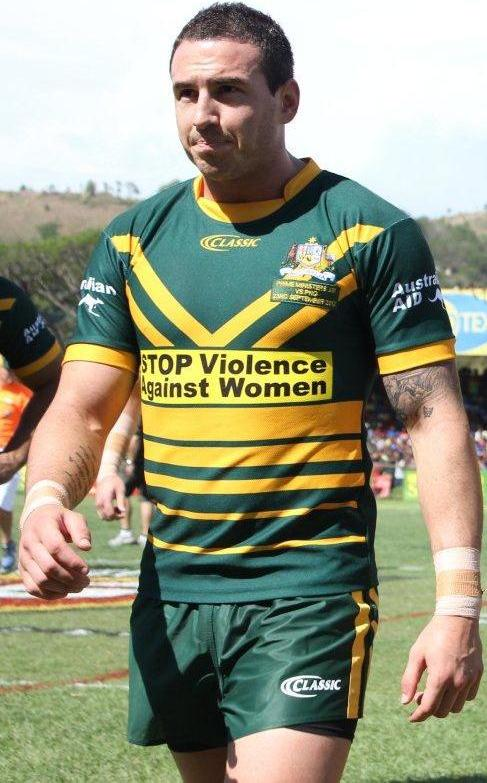
Boyd playing for the Prime Minister's XIII in 2012

In Round 1 of the 2012 NRL season, Boyd made his club debut for the Newcastle Knights against his former club the St George Illawarra Dragons, playing at fullback in the Knights 15-14 golden point extra time loss at Hunter Stadium. On 20 April 2012, Boyd played for Australia in the 2012 Anzac Test, playing on the wing in the Kangaroos 20–12 win Eden Park. Boyd played on the wing for Queensland in all three matches of the 2012 State of Origin series, scoring 3 tries in the Maroons 7th consecutive series win.

In Round 21 against the Canberra Raiders, Boyd scored his first club try as a Knight in the 36–6 win at Canberra Stadium. Boyd finished his first year with the Knights with him playing in 22 matches and scoring 3 tries. On 23 September 2012, Boyd for Prime Minister's XIII against Papua New Guinea, playing at fullback in the 24–18 win at Port Moresby. On 13 October 2012, Boyd played on the wing for Australia in their 18–10 win over New Zealand.

=== 2013 ===
On 19 April 2013, Boyd played for Australia on the wing and scored a try in the 2013 Anzac Test 32–12 victory. He played all three games and was the top try scorer with 3 in the 2013 State of Origin series in which Queensland extended their record for consecutive series victories to eight. Boyd played in 26 matches and scored 11 tries for the Knights. Selected in the 24-man Australian 2013 Rugby League World Cup squad, he played in 5 matches and scored 4 tries. Boyd played on the wing in the Kangaroos 34-2 World Cup Final win against the Kiwis at Old Trafford.

=== 2014 ===
On 2 May 2014, Boyd played on the wing for Australia in the 2014 Anzac Test, in the Kangaroos' 30–18 win at the Sydney Football Stadium.

In Round 13 against the Wests Tigers at Hunter Stadium, Boyd played his 200th career match in the Knights' 23–20 loss.

Boyd played on the wing in all three matches of the 2014 State of Origin series, scoring three tries in the Maroons' first series defeat since 2005.

On 23 July 2014, Boyd admitted himself to a mental health clinic to treat depression. On 14 August, he completed treatment and later spoke publicly about his recovery.

He did not return to the Knights for the remainder of the season, instead focusing on his recovery.

He finished the 2014 NRL season having played 14 matches and scored three tries for the Knights.

On 31 October 2014, Boyd was released from the final year of his Knights contract.

On 21 November 2014, Boyd signed a three-year contract with the Brisbane Broncos, returning to the club where he made his debut in 2006.

On 5 December 2014, Boyd ruptured his Achilles tendon during pre-season training; this injury was expected to keep him out of action for at least six months, possibly seeing him sidelined for the entire 2015 season.

=== 2015 ===
On 5 May 2015, Boyd made a surprise return in Round 9 against the Penrith Panthers at fullback in the Broncos' 8–5 win at Suncorp Stadium.

Queensland coach Mal Meninga showed faith in Boyd for State of Origin selection despite him not playing the majority of the early 2015 NRL season. Boyd played in all three matches of the 2015 State of Origin series, scoring one try for Queensland.

In Round 16 against his former club the Newcastle Knights, Boyd scored his first try since returning to the Broncos in their 44–22 win at Suncorp Stadium.

In the preliminary final against the Sydney Roosters, Boyd scored an intercept try in the opening minute after Roosters winger Shaun Kenny-Dowall threw a risky long pass intended for fullback Roger Tuivasa-Sheck. The Broncos won 31–12, advancing to the grand final.

On 4 October 2015, Boyd played at fullback in the 2015 NRL Grand Final against the North Queensland Cowboys, which the Broncos lost 17–16 in golden point extra time.

Boyd finished the season having played 18 matches and scored three tries for the Broncos in the 2015 NRL season.

=== 2016 ===
On 1 February, Boyd was named in the Broncos' 2016 NRL Auckland Nines squad. Following a season-ending shoulder injury to his Queensland Origin team-mate Billy Slater, Boyd was selected to play Fullback for Australia against New Zealand in the 2016 Anzac Test, scoring a try on the 16–0 win at Hunter Stadium. With Billy Slater already out of action due to injury, Boyd filled the Fullback role for Queensland in the 2016 State of Origin series, where he played in all 3 matches and scored 1 try in the Maroons series win. In Round 14 against the Canberra Raiders, Boyd scored a classy hat trick of tries in a space of 14 minutes in the Broncos 26–18 win at Suncorp Stadium. This was the first time Boyd scored a hat trick of tries since Round 1 of the 2008 season. Boyd finished the 2016 NRL season with him playing in 25 matches and scoring 9 tries for the Broncos. On 20 September 2016, Boyd was added to the Kangaroos 2016 Four Nations train-on squad. On 4 October 2016, Boyd was selected in the Australian Kangaroos Final 24-man squad for the tournament.

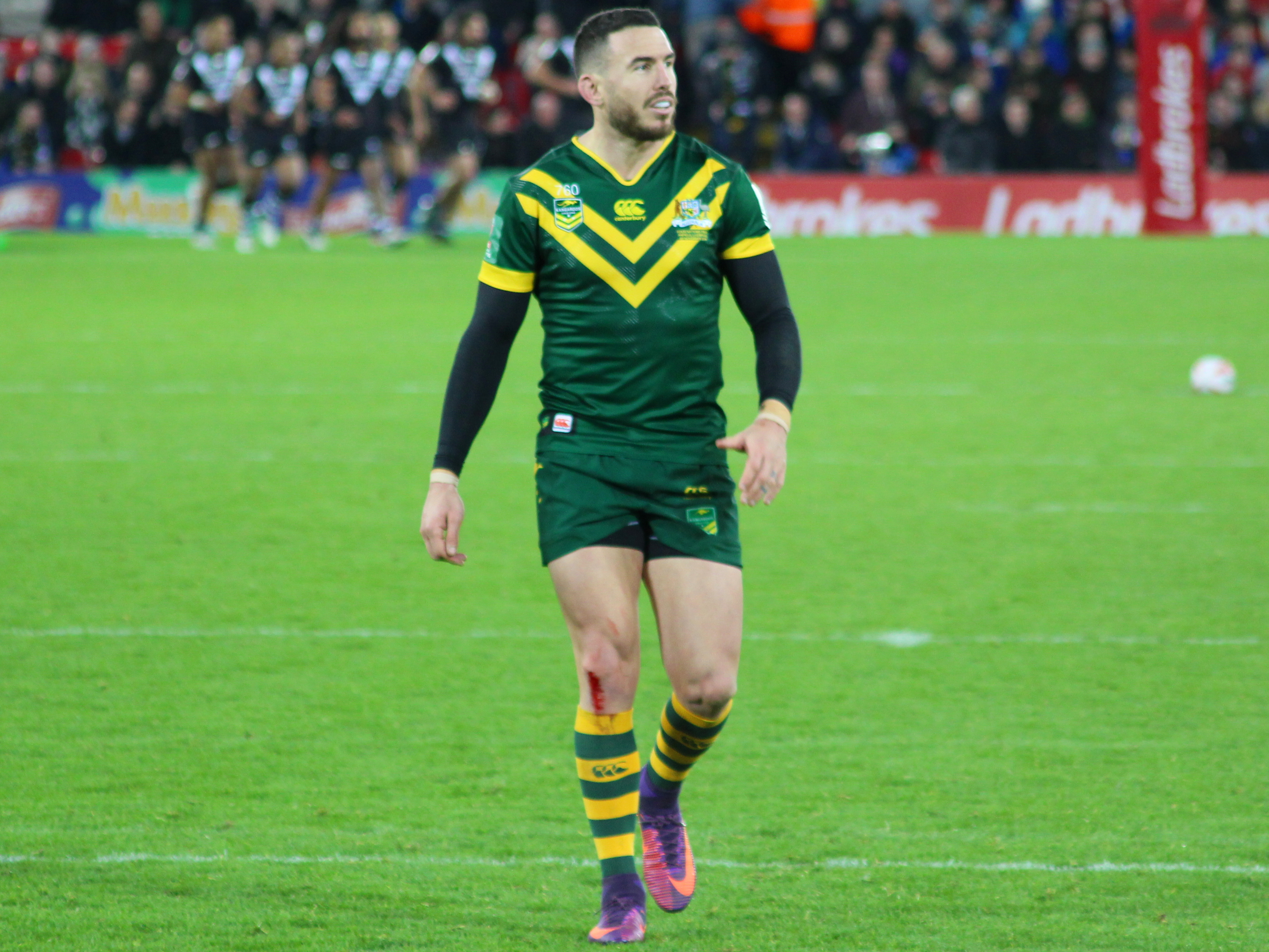
Boyd playing for the Kangaroos at Anfield in 2016

Boyd played in 4 matches and scored 2 tries of tournament including starting at fullback and scoring a try in the Kangaroos 34-8 Four Nations Final win against New Zealand at Anfield. On 7 October 2016, Boyd was awarded with the Paul Morgan Medal as being the Broncos best-and-fairest player of the season.

=== 2017 ===
Before the start of the 2017 season, Boyd joined the likes of Darren Lockyer, Wally Lewis, Allan Langer and Gorden Tallis when he was named the ninth Broncos captain in the club's 30-year history. In February, he was selected in the Broncos 2017 NRL Auckland Nines squad. His first game as captain of the Broncos ended with a 27–18 loss at Halliwell Jones Stadium to the Warrington Wolves in the 2017 World Club Series. In Round 3 against the Melbourne Storm, Boyd played his 250th NRL career match in the Broncos 14–12 loss at AAMI Park. On 5 May, Boyd played for Australia in the 2017 ANZAC Test where he started at fullback in the 30–12 win. Despite Billy Slater coming back from injury, Boyd retained his Maroons fullback role for Game 1 of the series. However, in Game 2 Boyd was switched to centre to accommodate Slater's return to the fullback position. In Round 26 against the North Queensland Cowboys, Boyd injured his hamstring. Scans revealed bad news for Brisbane with Boyd ruled out for the next 2 finals matches. In the preliminary final against the Melbourne Storm, Boyd made his return as the Broncos looked to make the grand final for the second time in three years. Commentators believed Boyd wasn't fully recovered and replays saw him limping. In the second half, Boyd succumbed to his hamstring injury, with the Broncos eventually losing 30-0 and later missed selection for the Kangaroos 2017 Rugby League World Cup squad. Boyd finished his 2017 NRL season with 18 matches and 3 tries for the Broncos. On 26 October, Boyd extended his contract with the Broncos on a four-year deal, keeping him at Red Hill until at least the 2021 season.

=== 2018 ===
On 11 June 2018, Boyd announced that he had retired from playing in representative matches after missing out on selection for Queensland. He commented, "My time's done in rep footy. I've had a great career, I have nothing to be disappointed about, I'm really happy with everything I've achieved in the rep arena. I don't think I have anything more to prove, it's time for the younger fellas coming in, they have great players, really quality guys coming through." Between Rounds 19–21, Boyd played at centre as coach Wayne Bennett experimented playing youngster Jamayne Isaako at fullback. Boyd finished the 2018 NRL season with him playing of the 25 matches and scoring 5 tries for the Broncos.

=== 2019 ===
In Round 8 against the South Sydney Rabbitohs, Boyd played his 300th NRL career match, playing his milestone game against his old mentor, Rabbitohs coach Wayne Bennett who Boyd spent his whole career being coached by him until the 2019 season when Bennett was given the sack by the Broncos and swapped clubs with Anthony Seibold. The Broncos lost the match 38–6 at ANZ Stadium as the Rabbitohs dedicated the win to the recently retired Rabbitohs star Greg Inglis. Boyd has copped plenty of criticism for his form in the early rounds of the 2019 season, practically his defence and leadership. Boyd commented, "I don't know what the outside noise is saying, but my body is really good and my form, I'm pretty happy with it. "I spoke to 'Seibs' (Broncos coach Anthony Seibold) and he's happy with how I'm performing, "I know if we win some games the critics will go away. "I can be better and I'm not saying I don't have to put my hand up and be better, because I know I do, especially as a captain, but I'm not losing sleep over my performances".

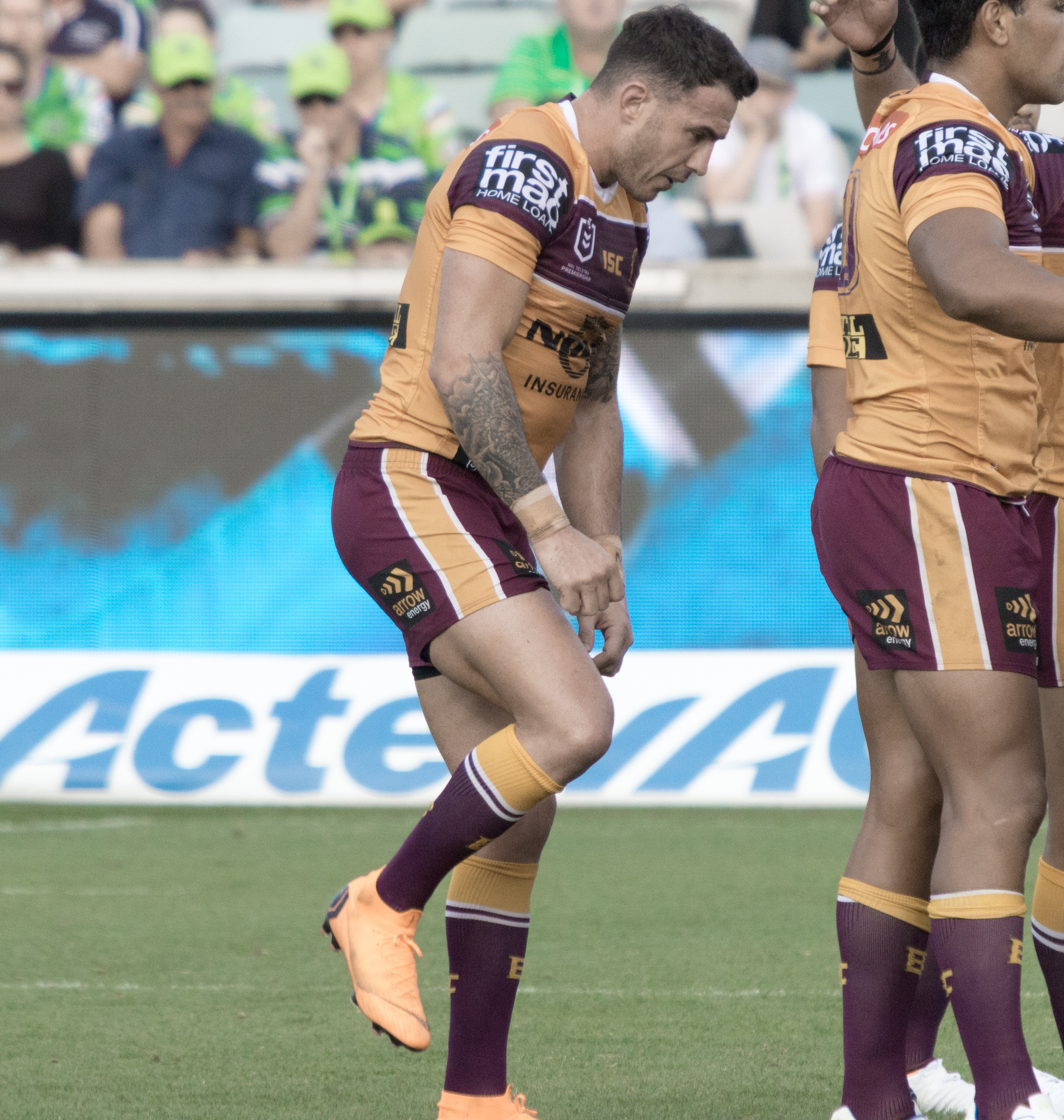
Boyd playing for the Broncos in 2019

On 30 August 2019, Boyd was selected at Wing for the Queensland Maroons Team of the Decade.

At the end of the 2019 regular season, Brisbane finished in 8th place on the table and qualified for the finals. Boyd captained the club in their elimination final against Parramatta which Brisbane lost 58–0 at Western Sydney Stadium. The defeat was, at the time, Brisbane's biggest ever loss and the biggest loss in finals history which eclipsed Newtown's record when they defeated St George 55–7 in 1944.

=== 2020 ===
On 6 March 2020, Boyd announced that he would retire at the end of the 2020 NRL season despite having one year left to run on his contract. He was the final member from the club's 2006 premiership team to retire.

In round 20 of the 2020 NRL season, Boyd sustained a career-ending injury against rivals North Queensland at Suncorp Stadium. Boyd scored a first half try as the Broncos lost the match 32–16.

== Post playing ==
On 4 October 2024, Boyd revealed that he had departed the Broncos after the exit of former coach Kevin Walters. Boyd had been working with the teams outside backs as a mentor.

On 5 February 2025, the Queensland Maroons announced that Boyd had been named the coach of the Queensland Under 19 men's team. That year, he led the side to their first win in the fixture since its reinstatement in 2022, winning again in 2026. In 2026, he was head coach of the Broncos' under-21 NRLQ Series side.

On 3 September 2026, Boyd was announced as the head coach of the Queensland State of Origin men's team, following Billy Slater's departure. He signed a contract covering the 2027 and 2028 series.

== Statistics ==
Year	Team	Games	Tries	Pts
2006	Brisbane Broncos	27	11	44
2007	Brisbane Broncos	22	7	28
2008	Brisbane Broncos	24	13	52
2009	St. George Illawarra Dragons	22	2	8
2010	St. George Illawarra Dragons	25	2	8
2011	St. George Illawarra Dragons	22	9	36
2012	Newcastle Knights	22	3	12
2013	Newcastle Knights	26	11	44
2014	Newcastle Knights	14	3	12
2015	Brisbane Broncos	18	3	12
2016	Brisbane Broncos	25	9	36
2017	Brisbane Broncos	20	3	12
2018	Brisbane Broncos	25	5	20
2019	Brisbane Broncos	25	3	12
2020	Brisbane Broncos	20	3	12
	Totals	341	88	352

== Personal life ==
Boyd married Kayla Boyd in 2012.

In 2014, he spent three weeks in a private psychiatric hospital, located in Western Sydney, being treated for depression, after his wife Kayla Boyd temporarily left him. He quit the Knights mid-season. Boyd left after spending 3 weeks there.

In 2017, Kayla Boyd had a miscarriage before falling pregnant four months later and terminating that pregnancy because she "wasn't ready".

The Boyds' first daughter was born on September 26, 2015. Second daughter was born on September 28, 2019. Their third daughter was born March 15, 2021.

Boyd featured on the third season of the Seven Network's reality quasi-military training television programme SAS Australia: Who Dares Wins, which premiered on 21 February 2022.

Preceded by Billy Slater (Melbourne Storm)	Clive Churchill Medallist; 2010	Succeeded by Glenn Stewart (Manly-Warringah Sea Eagles)
