= Chris Heighington =

England international rugby league footballer

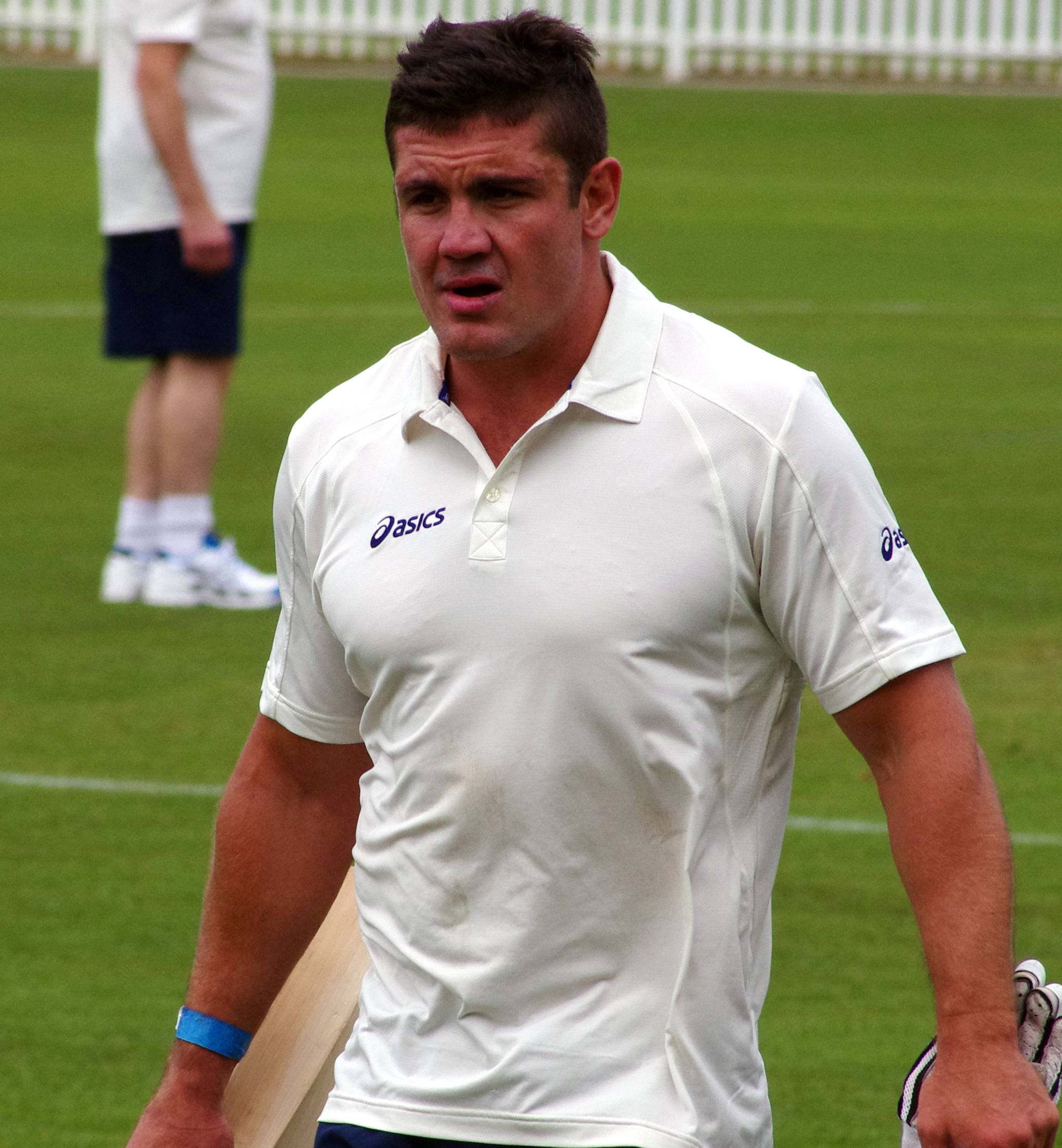

Personal information
- Full name: Christopher Heighington
- Born: 14 January 1982 (age 44) Camden, New South Wales, Australia

Playing information
- Height: 187 cm (6 ft 2 in)
- Weight: 103 kg (16 st 3 lb)
- Position: Lock, Second-row, Prop
Club
Years	Team	Pld	T	G	FG	P
2003–12	Wests Tigers	201	39	0	0	156
2013–17	Cronulla Sharks	116	2	0	0	8
2018	Newcastle Knights	21	1	0	0	4
	Total	338	42	0	0	168
Representative
Years	Team	Pld	T	G	FG	P
2008–09	Prime Minister's XIII	2	0	0	0	0
2008–11	NSW Country	2	0	0	0	0
2011–17	England	8	2	0	0	8
2013	NRL All Stars	1	0	0	0	0

Christopher Heighington (born 14 January 1982) is a former professional rugby league footballer. An English international, Country New South Wales and NRL All Stars representative, his positions were lock, second-row and prop. He played for the Wests Tigers and Cronulla-Sutherland Sharks, winning a premiership with each, before finishing his career with the Newcastle Knights.

== Background ==
He was born in Camden, New South Wales, Australia.

== Club career ==
=== Wests Tigers ===
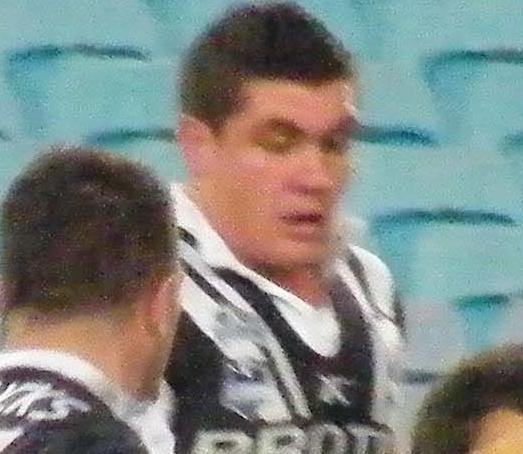
Heighington playing for Wests in 2008

A Umina Bunnies junior, Heighington made his début for Wests Tigers in 2003. He later said, "To be honest, I couldn't believe I was making my début. It was a great experience. It came so quickly. I only started the pre-season at the end of 2002." He made seven appearances from the bench that year, and was a backup again in 2004. By 2005 he had cemented his place in the team and played from the interchange bench in the Tigers' 30–16 victory in the 2005 NRL grand final over the North Queensland Cowboys.

As NRL Premiers Wests faced Super League champions Bradford Bulls in the 2006 World Club Challenge. Heighington played at second-row forward in the Tigers' 30–10 loss.

Heighington won the award for Wests Tigers' Player of the Year for 2008. He was selected to play in the 2008 Country Origin side as well as the Prime Minister's XIII team which visited Papua New Guinea. He was called into the 2009 Prime Minister's XIII for the injured Luke Lewis.

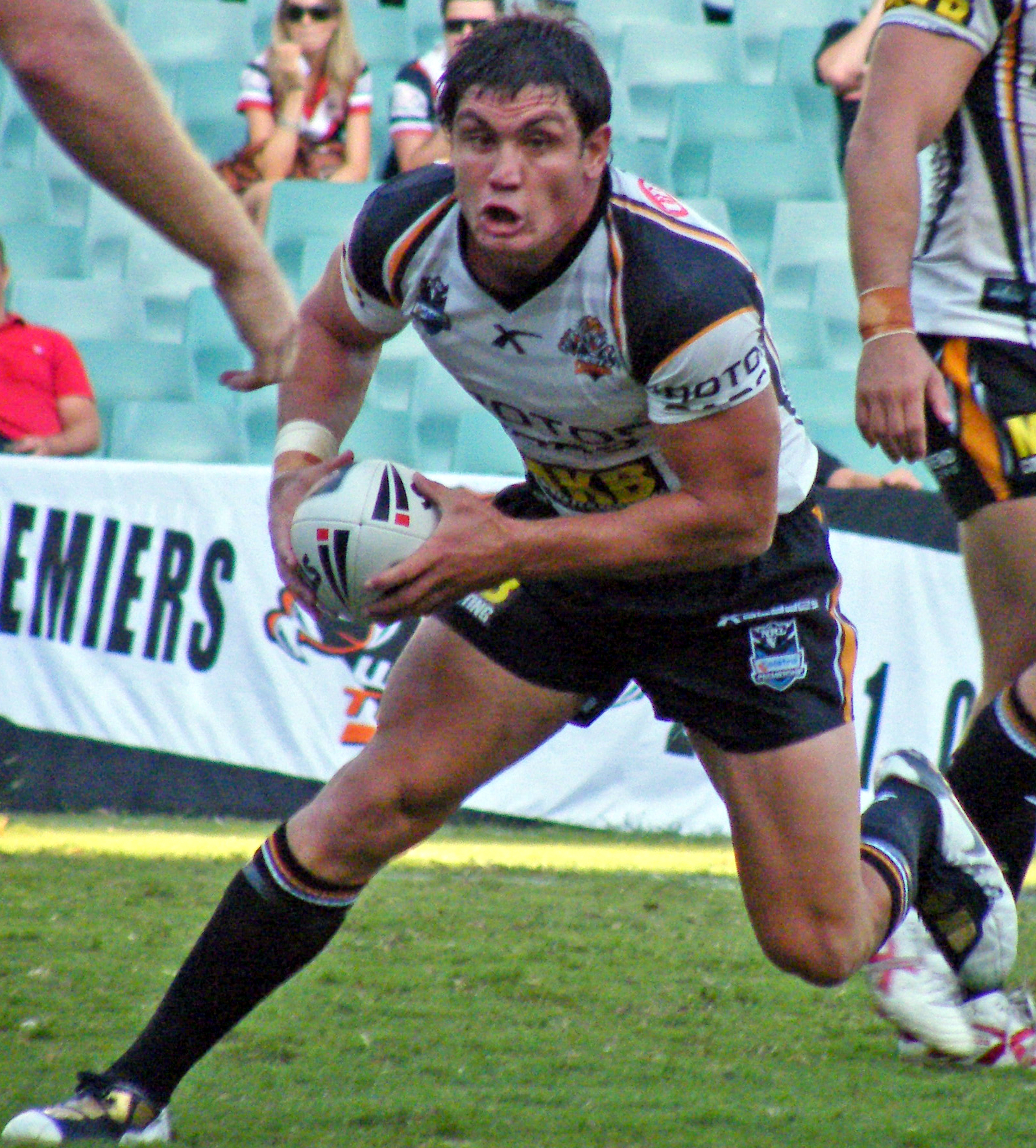
Heighington playing for Wests in 2009

Before the start of the 2011 season, Ricky Stuart named Heighington in a "Blues in Waiting" squad, for potential future NSW State of Origin players. He was described as one of the players, "on the cusp of selection." He was considered by some unlucky to have not played State of Origin.

Having played in every game of the 2007, 2008, 2010 and 2011 seasons, Heighington set the record for most appearances by a Wests Tigers player in 2012, surpassing the milestone of 185 set by John Skandalis. Described by team-mate Benji Marshall as, "the heart and soul of Wests Tigers on and off the field," the club controversially released him after failing to make the semi-finals in 2012.

Signing a three-year contract with the Cronulla-Sutherland Sharks, Heighington said, "'I don't know what to say except I'm a bit disappointed. I thought I would be a one-team player but, at the end of the day, if the coach doesn't want you, he doesn't want you."

==== Grand final controversy ====
Following the grand final victory, Heighington was interviewed by Nine Network sideline commentator Matthew Johns, who asked Heighington to describe the feeling of winning the premiership. Heighington replied "Yeah mate it’s fucking awesome, you don’t know how to fucking ... there’s no words for it, it’s just fucking unbelievable". In the following days, the Wests Tigers club issued a statement apologising for the inappropriate language used by some of their players.

=== Cronulla-Sutherland Sharks ===
In round 1 of the 2013 NRL season, Heighington made his club début for the Cronulla-Sutherland Sharks against the Gold Coast Titans playing off the interchange bench in the 12-10 win at Remondis Stadium. He played in all of Cronulla's 26 matches and scored one try.

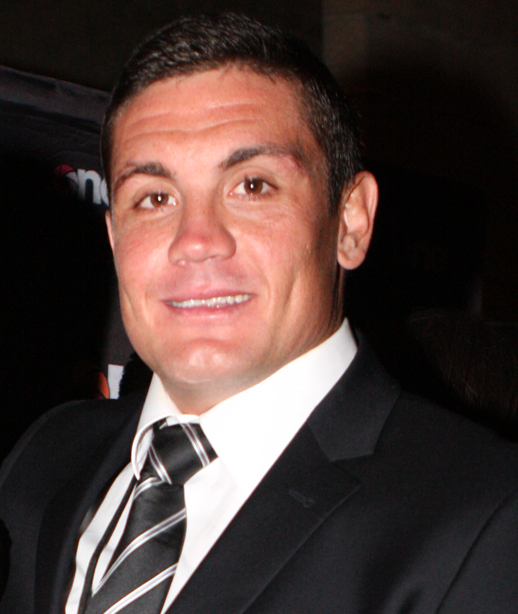
Heighington in 2013

In an effort to motivate his 2016 Sharks teammates to win their first premiership, Heighington bet them his foreskin: he promised to subject himself to being circumcised if his team won.

In 2016, he came off the bench in Cronulla's first premiership win 14-12 over the Melbourne Storm for his second premiership victory.

Heighington played his 300th game on 1 April 2017, saying, "It’s hard to believe I’m on the same list of 300-game players as him. To see my name alongside Brad Fittler, Darren Lockyer, Terry Lamb, Andrew Ettingshausen, and many more, I’m just so grateful." As of April 2017, Heighington was one of only three current NRL players to have eclipsed 300 NRL games, the others being Melbourne's Cooper Cronk and Cameron Smith.

=== Newcastle Knights ===
After 116 games with the Sharks, Heighington signed a one-year contract with the Newcastle Knights starting in 2018.

In round 1 of the 2018 season, Heighington made his début for Newcastle in their 19-18 golden point extra-time win over the Manly Warringah Sea Eagles.

On 31 July 2018, Heighington announced that the 2018 season would be his last after a 16-season career. He has played over 330 professional games with 3 clubs, winning a premiership with the Wests Tigers in 2005, and the Cronulla-Sutherland Sharks in 2016.

=== Highlights ===
- First Grade début: 2003 – Round 1, Wests Tigers v St George Illawarra Dragons, Stadium Australia, Sydney, 15 March.
- Premierships: 2005 – Wests Tigers defeated North Queensland Cowboys 30 – 16 in the Grand Final at Stadium Australia, Sydney, 2 October.
- Premierships: 2016 - Cronulla-Sutherland Sharks defeated Melbourne Storm 14 - 12 in the Grand Final at Stadium Australia, Sydney, 2 October.
- NSW Country Origin début: 2008 – NSW Country Origin v NSW City Origin, WIN Stadium, Wollongong, New South Wales, 2 May.
- NSW Country Origin Selection: 2008, 2011
- Prime Minister's XIII début: 2008 – Prime Minister's XIII v Papua New Guinea, Lloyd Robson Oval, Port Moresby, Papua New Guinea, 27 September.
- Prime Minister's XIII Selection: 2008–2009
- 300 First Grade Games round 5 2017

== Representative career ==
Heighington has a British passport through his father, and was eligible to represent England if he chose to (Heighington's father Tom emigrated to Australia when he was about 15 from County Durham, an area the family have retained strong links with, including their association with the village of Heighington near Darlington). Heighington took up the option in 2011 and was named in the England train-on squad for the 2011 Four-Nations. Coach Steve McNamara noting, "His work-rate and work ethic are first class." Heighington played in the warm up test against France and also the opening game of the Four Nations against Wales. He scored his first international try against Wales after Gareth Widdop put him over the line. Heighington played in all the preliminary games of the Four Nations, scoring a further try, but was ruled out of participating in the final.

In October 2017, he was selected in the England squad for the 2017 Rugby League World Cup.

== Statistics ==
Year	Team	Games	Tries	Pts
2003	Wests Tigers	7	1	4
2004	Wests Tigers	10	2	8
2005	Wests Tigers	24	4	16
2006	Wests Tigers	21	7	28
2007	Wests Tigers	24	4	16
2008	Wests Tigers	24	6	24
2009	Wests Tigers	18		
2010	Wests Tigers	27	6	24
2011	Wests Tigers	26	6	24
2012	Wests Tigers	20	3	12
2013	Cronulla-Sutherland Sharks	26	1	4
2014	Cronulla-Sutherland Sharks	19		
2015	Cronulla-Sutherland Sharks	23	1	4
2016	Cronulla-Sutherland Sharks	26		
2017	Cronulla-Sutherland Sharks	22		
2018	Newcastle Knights	21	1	4
	Totals	338	42	168

== Post playing ==
In 2019, Heighington was inducted as a life member of the Wests Tigers. In 2023, Heighington had completed his certificates for Fitness and begun Chris Heighington Sports Performance. Heighington was also named as assistant coach of the Wests Tigers alongside Robbie Farah, and was made strength and conditioning coach for the teams NSW cup side..
