= Ian Webster =

Wales international rugby league footballer, boxer and businessman

Personal information
- Full name: Ian Webster
- Born: 16 November 1986 (age 39) Whiston, Merseyside

Playing information
- Position: hooker, scrum-half
Club
Years	Team	Pld	T	G	FG	P
2006–06	St Helens	1	0	0	0	0
2007–07	Widnes Vikings	27	10	0	0	40
	Celtic Crusaders
	Total	28	10	0	0	40
Representative
Years	Team	Pld	T	G	FG	P
2007–13	Wales	14	3	14	0	40

Ian Webster (born 16 November 1986) a former Wales international rugby league footballer who plays as a hooker or scrum-half. He is well respected sports and business personality who is often engaged for leadership commentary or running analysis of sporting organisations.

== Background ==
Webster was born in Whiston, Merseyside, England. He set a world record, after having signed a sports contract at the age of 13. He later established another record as Wales rugby league’s highest single-game point scorer. Webster then became a boxer, where he gained international recognition, winning the Golden Gloves title twice and the Australian championship in three different weight divisions. Alongside his athletic career, Webster has also focused on creating various foundations, business ventures, and a residential property portfolio across the United Kingdom, Australia, and the United States.

Webster once owned and run the popular Sportstek university throughout QLD for disengaged school students from varying backgrounds. Sportstek liquidated in 2016. However, in 2015 was reported as being worth 15 million dollars (Aus). Webster was linked to Petero Civonaceva, Jordan Belfort (better known as "the Wolf of Wall Street") and Rod Kafer (former Wallabies player) on his business endeavours.

== Career ==
Webster is a Wales international.

He has previously played for St. Helens in the Super League, and also for the Widnes Vikings, and the Celtic Crusaders.

He was named in the Wales squad to face England at the Keepmoat Stadium prior to England's departure for the 2008 Rugby League World Cup.

In October 2013, Webster played for Wales in the 2013 Rugby League World Cup.

Ian is currently working as a Business development manager in Central Queensland, and has many high achiever accolades from his peers.

Ian is currently boxing in Australia and was the 2017 Australian Golden Gloves Champion. He will also represent Queensland in the Australian championship titles in Melbourne before turning professional in December.
