= Andy Bracek =

Wales international rugby league footballer

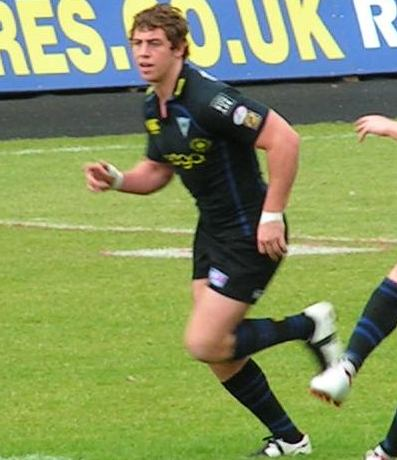

Personal information
- Full name: Andrew Bracek
- Born: 21 March 1987 (age 38); Leigh, Greater Manchester, England
- Height: 6 ft 1 in (185 cm)
- Weight: 16 st 5 lb (104 kg)

Playing information
- Position: Loose forward, Prop, Second-row
Club
Years	Team	Pld	T	G	FG	P
2004	St Helens	2	0	0	0	0
2005–08	Warrington Wolves	57	7	0	0	28
2009–10	Barrow Raiders	55	7	0	0	28
2011	Crusaders RL	2	0	0	0	0
2012	Barrow Raiders	20	2	0	0	8
2013–16	Halifax	87	10	0	0	40
2016–18	Swinton Lions	49	5	0	0	20
2019–	Leigh Centurions	0	0	0	0	0
	Total	272	31	0	0	124
Representative
Years	Team	Pld	T	G	FG	P
	Wales
- Source: As of 4 November 2017

Andy Bracek (born 21 March 1987) is a Wales international rugby league footballer who plays as a loose forward, prop and second-row forward for the Leigh Centurions in the Championship.

== Background ==
Bracek was born in Leigh, Greater Manchester, England.

== Playing career ==
He played at representative level for Wales, and at club level for Leigh Miners Rangers, St. Helens, Warrington, Barrow (two spells) and Crusaders RL.

Bracek attended Bedford High School in Bedford, Leigh, leaving in 2003. Throughout his childhood, Bracek trained and played at Leigh Miners Rangers, progressing through the ranks until St. Helens signed him to a youth deal as a teenager.

In November 2004, Bracek handed in a written transfer request at St. Helens and would go on to sign for Warrington for a fee of £20,000.

Bracek was named in the Wales squad to face England at the Keepmoat Stadium, Doncaster prior to England's departure for the 2008 Rugby League World Cup.
