= Mark Lennon =

Wales international rugby league footballer

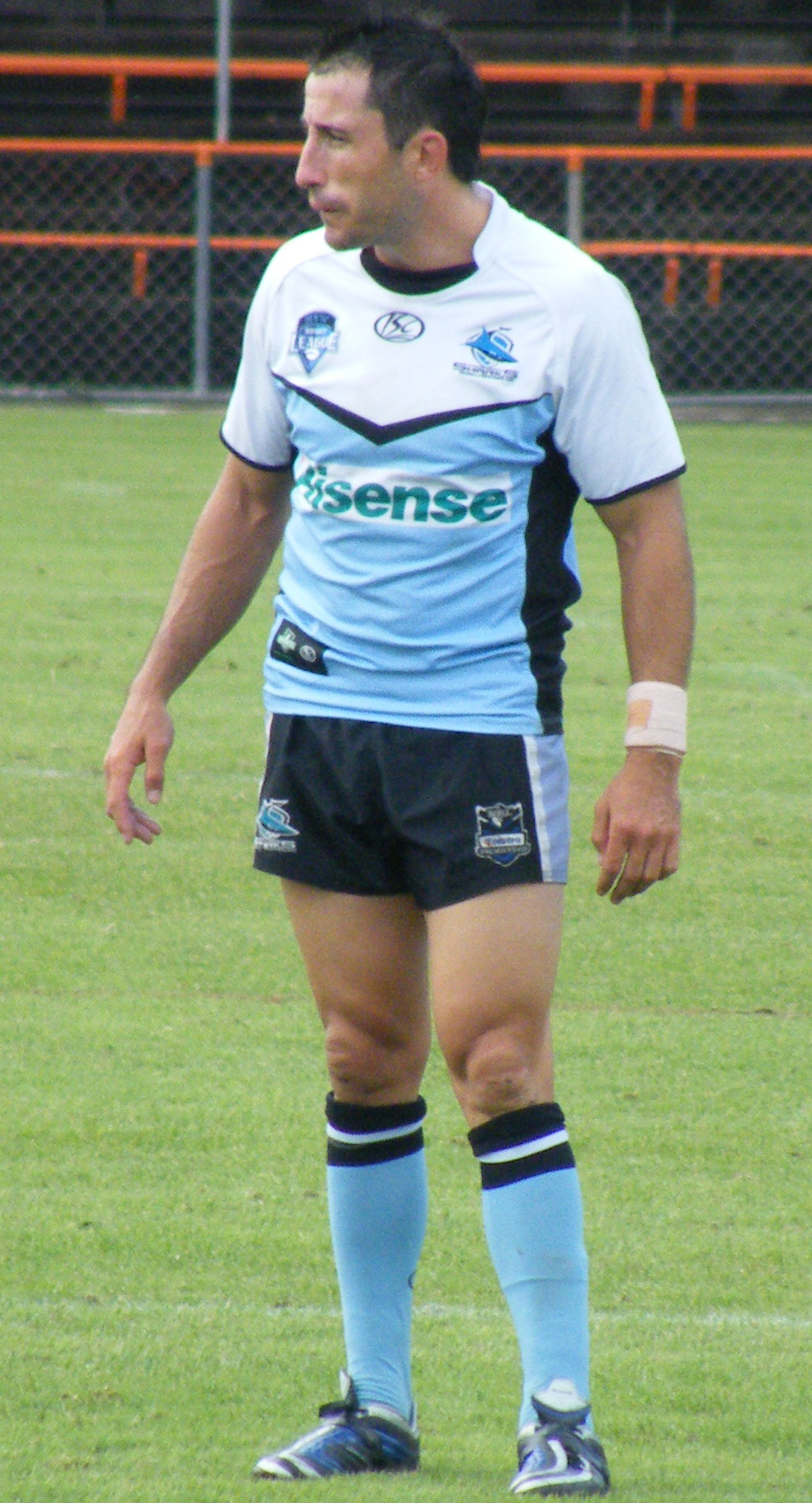

Personal information
- Full name: Mark David Lennon
- Born: 17 August 1980 (age 46) Sydney, New South Wales, Australia

Playing information
- Height: 177 cm (5 ft 10 in)
- Weight: 85 kg (13 st 5 lb)
- Position: Fullback, Wing, Centre, Stand-off, Scrum-half
Club
Years	Team	Pld	T	G	FG	P
2001–03	Castleford Tigers	51	10	21	0	82
2004–06	Manly Sea Eagles	1	0	0	0	0
2007	Cronulla Sharks	0	0	0	0	0
2007	Hull Kingston Rovers	15	5	7	0	34
2008–09	Crusaders RL	13	1	8	0	0
	Total	80	16	36	0	116
Representative
Years	Team	Pld	T	G	FG	P
2001–11	Wales	18	8	13	0	38

Mark Lennon (born 17 August 1980) is a former Wales international rugby league footballer who played in the 2000s and 2010s. He played at club level for the Cronulla-Sutherland Sharks (Jersey Flegg 19s, Premier League and NSW Cup), the St. George Dragons (Jersey Flegg 20s), the Castleford Tigers, the Manly-Warringah Sea Eagles, Hull Kingston Rovers, the Crusaders RL, as a fullback or scrum-half, however he could fit into any of the backline positions with ease making him somewhat of a utility back.

== Background ==
Lennon was born in Sydney, New South Wales, Australia.

== Overview ==
Lennon originally began playing rugby league at a young age for local club side Miranda Magpies before moving to Como Jannali RLFC At Age 14 before he was spotted by scouts from the National Rugby League club the Cronulla-Sutherland Sharks, and signed to a development deal. After several seasons with the Cronulla-based club Lennon moved to the St George Illawarra Dragons first Under 20s Jersey Flegg team. After one season with the Dragons, Lennon decided to take up an offer with the Super League club the Castleford Tigers at the age of twenty in 2001.

While at the Castleford Tigers Lennon made his Welsh début for the national side in a mid-season fixture against England. After several years at the Castleford Tigers he left and returned to Australia signing for the Manly-Warringah Sea Eagles but only managed to make a sole appearance in three years with the club playing behind Brett Stewart in the Premier League. In 2007 he then returned to his first club the Cronulla-Sutherland Sharks training with the NRL squad but playing Premier League early in 2007 before again moving to England after being signed by Super League newcomers Hull Kingston Rovers.

== Childhood and early career ==
Lennon originally began playing rugby league at an early age 10 for Gymea (in Gymea, New South Wales) before moving to Miranda Magpies at age 11 and the joined the Como Jannali RLFC. After several seasons with the club he was spotted by a Cronulla-Sutherland Sharks scout and offered a junior development contract.

After working his way through the junior grades at Cronulla Lennon moved to the St. George Dragons before he signed for English club the Castleford Tigers while still twenty years of age.

== Castleford Tigers ==
After signing for the Castleford Tigers in 2001 Lennon quickly made a name for himself as somewhat of a classy utility back usually playing at either fullback or filling one of the half positions. Mark would quickly cement his place within the Castleford Tigers starting thirteen and became a vital member of the teams attack and with his contribution the Castleford Tigers had successful 2001 and 2002 campaigns finishing mid-table and making the Rugby League Challenge Cup semi-finals in consecutive years.

Lennon missed the majority of the 2003 season because of injury, mainly due to a broken leg which meant he could only make a few appearances for the club that year and at the conclusion of the 2004 he moved to Manly-Warringah Sea Eagles.

== Manly-Warringah Sea Eagles ==
Lennon was originally signed as a depth replacement on an incentive-based offer for the beginning of the 2004 National Rugby League season and was seen as the long term option to take over from Luke Dorn who had been released from the club because of his arrival.

== Cronulla-Sutherland Sharks ==
Lennon returned to his original 'home' club side the Cronulla-Sutherland Sharks in 2007 for the first time since he originally signed for them as a teenager. During the first four rounds of competition however he failed to make a sole first grade appearance for the club and was relegated to playing in reserve grade as a utility. After only several weeks at the Cronulla-Sutherland Sharks he left and returned to the United Kingdom signing with Hull Kingston Rovers.

== Hull Kingston Rovers ==
After newly promoted Hull Kingston Rovers had sustained several injuries to key players during their maiden Super League season, head coach Justin Morgan (a Wales teammate) offered Lennon a one-year deal at Craven Park. Morgan stated that his versatility and accomplished goal-kicking were key points in the signing.

He made his début for his new club during their home fixture against Salford. Lennon would start on the bench eventually being substituted onto the field and scoring a try on début although Rovers would eventually lose by four points 28–24.

He was released from Hull Kingston Rovers on 17 September 2007

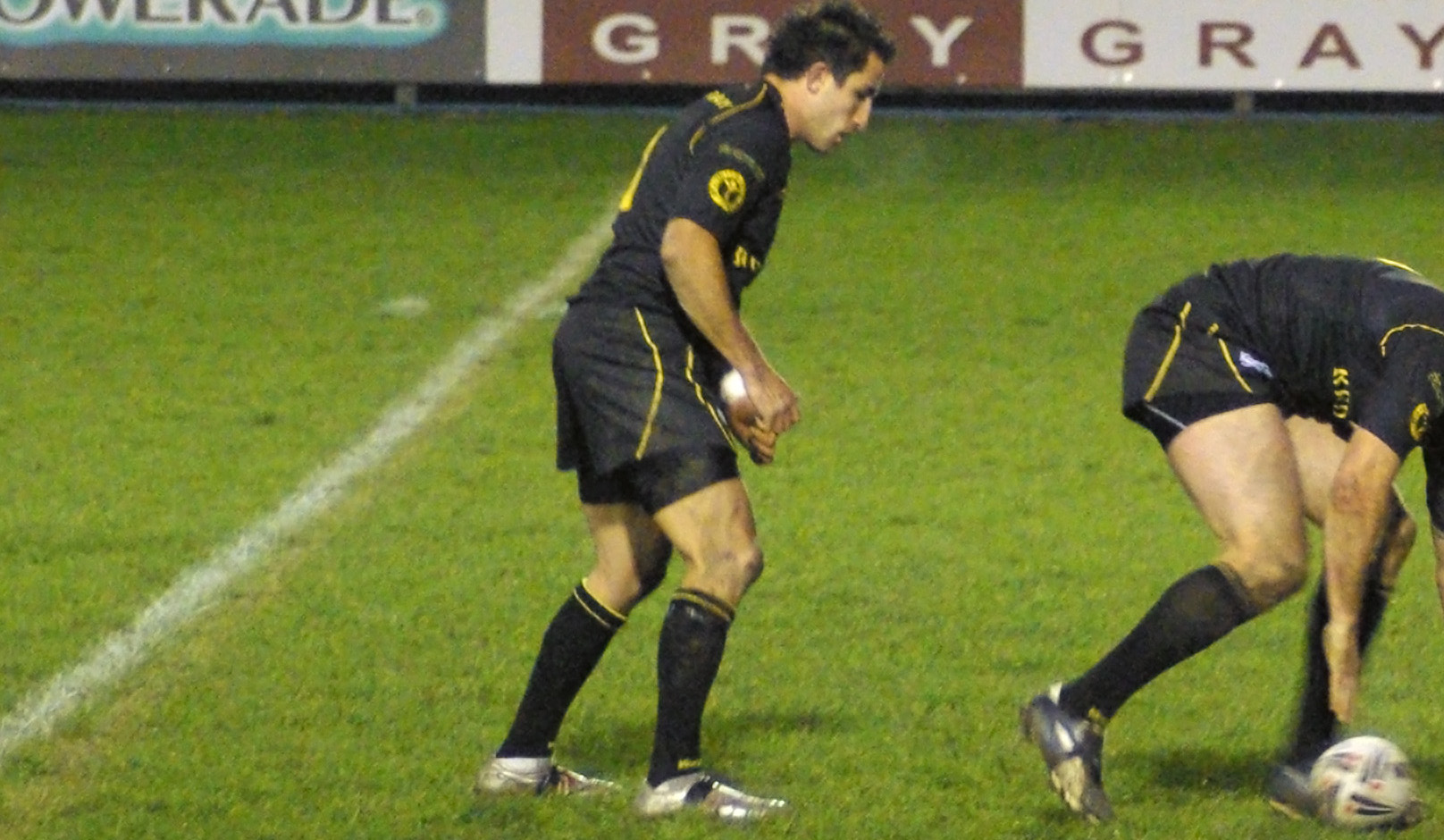
Lennon playing for the Celtic Crusaders

== Celtic Crusaders ==
Lennon signed with the Celtic crusaders in 2008 in the hope they would win a Super League licence and played in the National League Grand Final in 2008. 2009 was Lennon's last year in the Super League with the Celtic Crusaders before returning to Australia and playing the 2010 season with the Cronulla-Sutherland Sharks in the NSW Cup.

== Wales ==
Lennon made his début for the Welsh national side during the 2001 season after qualifying to play for them through his parental heritage with his mother being born in Wales. His first match for Wales was a mid-season test match against England where he had an impressive début playing at fullback although Wales would eventually lose by five points in a narrow 38–33 loss.

For the following five years Lennon would go on to make a further eight appearances for Wales with matches against Australia and New Zealand as well as playing in the European Nations Cup where he scored a sixteen-point haul against Russia at Aberavon in 2003. His most recent appearance came during the European Championship when he was flown out from Australia while playing for Manly for an international fixture against France where Wales would eventually lose 38-16

After signing with Hull Kingston Rovers for the 2007 season Lennon appeared in squads for Wales in their next major matches against Papua New Guinea in late 2007. Lennon scored a late try in the game v PNG but tore a hamstring and missed the Scotland and Lebanon game for the rugby league 2008 World Cup qualifiers. Lennon appeared in 2008 for wales v England then did not feature due to family circumstances in 2009. Lennon then made 5 more appearances in 2010 and 2011 in Wales' triumphant European Cup, and Four Nations campaigns.

== International honours ==
Lennon won caps for Wales while at the Castleford Tigers, the Manly Sea Eagles, the Hull Kingston Rovers, and the Celtic Crusaders 2001...present 13(10, 12?)-caps 4(3?)-tries 12(13?)-goals 40(38?)-points.

He was named in the Wales squad to face England at the Keepmoat Stadium prior to England's departure for the 2008 Rugby League World Cup.

In 2010 he represented Wales in the Alitalia European Cup.

== Career playing statistics ==
=== Point scoring summary ===
Games	Tries	Goals	F/G	Points
53	-	-	-	-

=== Matches played ===
Team	Matches	Years
Castleford Tigers	51	2001–2003
Manly-Warringah Sea Eagles	1	2004–2006
Cronulla-Sutherland Sharks	-	2007
Hull Kingston Rovers	1	2007 -
Wales	9	2001–2006

Celtic Crusaders 2008-2009

Cronulla Sharks NSW CUP 2010
