= Aled James =

Wales international rugby league footballer

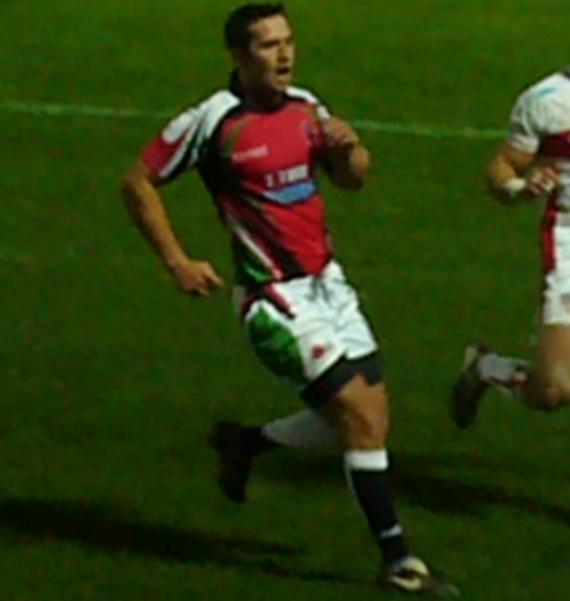

Personal information
- Full name: Aled James
- Born: 17 February 1982 (age 44) Caerphilly, Wales
- Height: 188 cm (6 ft 2 in)
- Weight: 98 kg (15 st 6 lb)

Playing information

Rugby union
- Position: Centre
Club
Years	Team	Pld	T	G	FG	P
200x–0x	Aberavon RFC

Rugby league
- Position: Wing, Centre, Stand-off
Club
Years	Team	Pld	T	G	FG	P
	Cardiff Demons
2003	Widnes Vikings	3	0	0	0	0
2004–06	Sheffield Eagles
2006–10	Crusaders	16	6	0	0	24
2010–13	South Wales Scorpions	31	11	10	0	64
	Total	50	17	10	0	88
Representative
Years	Team	Pld	T	G	FG	P
2003–10	Wales	13	4	0	0	4

Aled James (born 17 February 1982) is currently a Welsh Rugby Union coach for Cardiff Rugby. He was previously a Welsh rugby league player-coach for the South Wales Scorpions in the Championship 1. He also previously played for the Crusaders in the Super League, as a centre or wing.

== Background ==
James was born in Caerphilly, Wales.

== International honours ==
Aled James won caps for Wales while at Widnes, Sheffield, and Celtic Crusaders 2003...present 6(9?)-caps + 2-caps (interchange/substitute) 1(2?)-try 4(8?)-points.

He was named in the Wales squad to face England at the Keepmoat Stadium prior to England's departure for the 2008 Rugby League World Cup.
