= Danny Jones (rugby league) =

Wales international rugby league footballer (1986–2015)

- Jones photographed in 2013

Personal information
- Full name: Daniel Peter Jones
- Born: 6 March 1986 Halifax, West Yorkshire, England
- Died: 3 May 2015 (aged 29) Hampstead, London, England

Playing information
- Position: Stand-off, Scrum-half
Club
Years	Team	Pld	T	G	FG	P
2003–06	Halifax	24	6	35	1	95
2007–10	Keighley Cougars	75	19	279	4	638
2011	Halifax	31	11	97	1	239
2012–15	Keighley Cougars	79	13	165	3	385
	Total	209	49	576	9	1357
Representative
Years	Team	Pld	T	G	FG	P
2010–13	Wales	10	0	3	0	6

Danny Jones (6 March 1986 – 3 May 2015) was a Wales international rugby league footballer who played in the 2000s and 2010s. He played at club level for Halifax (two spells), and the Keighley Cougars (two spells), as a stand-off or scrum-half.

== Background ==
Jones was born in Halifax, West Yorkshire, England.

== Playing career ==
=== Club career ===
Jones played for Halifax amateur teams, Ovenden and King Cross before turning professional and signing for Halifax. He made his first team début aged 17 years and 200 days in what was to be his only Super League appearance, Halifax's last game of Super League VIII in 2003. He remained with Halifax until 2006 when he joined Keighley Cougars for the start of the 2007 season. After four seasons with Keighley, he returned to Halifax for the 2011 season but then moved back to Keighley in 2012.

=== International honours ===
Jones was a Wales international, having made his début in a defeat by Italy in 2010. He was named in the Wales squad for the 2013 Rugby League World Cup.

== Personal life ==
Jones married his wife Lizzie, a professional singer, in 2013. They had twins, Phoebe and Bobby, who were five months old at the time of Jones' death.

== Death ==
During a League 1 match between Keighley Cougars and London Skolars on 3 May 2015, Jones was substituted in the fourth minute of the game after reporting feeling unwell. Soon after he went into cardiac arrest, he received treatment at the scene by the match doctor and was transferred by air ambulance to the Royal Free Hospital where he subsequently died. The match was abandoned after the incident. A post-mortem revealed that the cardiac arrest was caused by a previous undetected, hereditary, heart disease.

Keighley announced on 4 May that the number 6 shirt number worn by Jones during the 2015 season would be retired with immediate effect. The shirt was un-retired for 2025 after discussion with Jones's family to mark the tenth anniversary of Jones's death. The main stand at Cougar Park was named The Danny Jones Stand at the end of May.

Jones' widow, Lizzie, performed the traditional Challenge Cup Final hymn, Abide With Me before the 2015 Challenge Cup Final, to say "thank you to players, fans and officials for their support since her husband's death" . Lizzie also sang Danny Boy at the BBC Sports Personality of the Year awards on 20 December 2015.

== Legacy ==
In February 2016, Lizzie worked with the RFL Benevolent Fund to establish the Danny Jones Defibrillator Fund to raise awareness of cardiac health among sports players and to help clubs purchase defibrillators as well as pushing for all players to undergo heart screening. By 2019 the fund had raised and distributed over £200,000 in grants to amateur clubs. In the 2020 New Year Honours, Lizzie was awarded an MBE for services to Rugby League Football and to Charity.

== See also ==
List of rugby league players who died during matches
