= Ross Divorty =

Wales international rugby league footballer

Personal information
- Born: 27 November 1988 (age 36); York, England

Playing information
- Height: 6 ft 2 in (188 cm)
- Weight: 15 st 10 lb (100 kg)
- Position: Second-row, Loose forward
Club
Years	Team	Pld	T	G	FG	P
2008	York City Knights	29	10	0	0	40
2009	Doncaster	14	4	0	0	16
2009–11	Featherstone Rovers	63	14	0	0	56
2012–16	Halifax	101	33	0	0	132
2016	York City Knights	4	0	0	0	0
	Total	211	61	0	0	244
Representative
Years	Team	Pld	T	G	FG	P
2009–13	Wales	12	2	0	0	8
- Father: Gary Divorty

Ross Divorty (born 27 November 1988) is a Welsh former professional rugby league footballer who played in the 2000s and 2010s. He has played at representative level for Wales, and at club level for Doncaster, Featherstone Rovers, Halifax, and York City Knights, as a second-row, or loose forward.

== Background ==
Ross Divorty was born in York, England, and he is the son of the rugby league footballer; Gary Divorty.

== Playing career ==
=== Club career ===
Ross Divorty made his début for Featherstone Rovers on Saturday 13 June 2009, and he played his last match for Featherstone Rovers during the 2011 season.

=== International honours ===
Although born in England, Divorty has a Welsh grandmother, making him eligible to play for Wales. He earned Wales caps playing in the 2009 European Cup, culminating in an appearance in the final at Bridgend's Brewery Field. He scored his first tries for Wales in the group stages of this tournament, scoring twice in an 88–8 win over Serbia. In October 2013, Ross played in the 2013 Rugby League World Cup.
