= 2009 Wigan Warriors season =

- Super League XIV Rank: 6th
- Play-off result: Lost qualifying semi-final (St Helens R.F.C., 14–10)
- Challenge Cup: Lost semi-final (Warrington Wolves, 26–39)
- 2009 record: Wins: 20; draws: 0; losses: 14
- Points scored: For: 716; against: 593

Team information
- Chairman: Ian Lenagan
- Head coach: Brian Noble
- Captain: Sean O'Loughlin
- Stadium: JJB Stadium
- Avg. attendance: 13,695
- High attendance: 22,232 (St Helens RLFC, 9 April)

Top scorers
- Tries: Pat Richards (23)
- Goals: Pat Richards (102)
- Points: Pat Richards (296)
← 2008	List of seasons	2010 →

Wigan Warriors played in the Super League XIV and Challenge Cup in the 2009 season.

== Background ==
Following Brian Noble's move from the Bradford Bulls to the Wigan Warriors in 2006, his third full season at the club took place in 2009. The season was also the first in which the Super League operated under a franchise system, after the Wigan Warriors were granted a 'B' license. The salary cap, which the club broke in 2007, was still in effect for this season, and the limit remained at GBP£1.7 million; the cap was maintained 'live', in continuation of an operational change by the Rugby Football League in 2008. As an ever-present club in the Super League format, this season was the Wigan Warriors' fourteenth year in the competition. This year also marked the tenth anniversary of rugby league at the JJB Stadium, after the club moved there upon the stadium's completion in 1999.

In contrast to the club's historical success, Wigan Warriors had not won a major trophy since 2002, when they defeated St Helens R.F.C. 12–21 in the Challenge Cup final. They had only won the Super League title once, in 1998. In the previous season the Wigan Warriors finished fourth in the league table meaning they qualified for the play-offs, and after defeating Bradford Bulls and Catalans Dragons, the club fell short of the 2008 Super League Grand Final after losing to Leeds Rhinos at Headingley for the second year running.

== Pre-season ==
Following their knock-out at the hands of Leeds, the task of acquiring new players began. 2008 was influential stand-off Trent Barrett's last season for the Warriors, after he signed for the Cronulla Sharks for the 2009 National Rugby League (NRL) season; Barrett himself insisted that Tim Smith could replace him, after Smith was released by Parramatta Eels following an episode of bipolar disorder. It was also to be the last season for Liam Colbon and Mark Calderwood, who both transferred away from the club. An attempt to sign the Canberra Raiders' Todd Carney ended after Huddersfield Giants signed him instead. The club prevented a possible cross-code transfer with George Carmont to rugby union by extending his contract. Wigan eventually signed their first new player with former Sydney Roosters player Amos Roberts, who was released from his contract a year prematurely, but lost another player to the Warrington Wolves in Mickey Higham. Joel Tomkins, a Wigan Warriors Youth Development product, also extended his contract until the end of the 2011 season. Rumours about a move for Ryan McGoldrick ended after he publicly ruled out any possible transfer. The question over Barrett's successor in the stand-off position was again raised when Tim Smith, who was on holiday in his native Australia at the time, approached the Cronulla Sharks seeking a return to the NRL, although the club did not pursue any deal with Smith and he therefore stayed at Wigan for the 2009 season. Greg Bird, who had been suspended by Cronulla Sharks for an alleged assault on his girlfriend was also cited by The Independent as a target for the Warriors, but any plans of a transfer were initially denied by the club's chairman, Ian Lenagan. On 30 January 2009, Lenagan confirmed it was unlikely there would be any more signings for the new season, having acquired two new players (Amos Roberts and Mark Riddell), after attempts to sign Richard Moore from Wakefield Trinity Wildcats failed.

The 2008 Rugby League World Cup was held in Australia during the off-season, and several Wigan players from the 2008 season were involved in matches concerning their own international teams. Pat Richards, Eamon O'Carroll and Michael McIlorum were called by the Irish team, with Paul Prescott missing out due to a back injury. Carmont and Harrison Hansen were selected for the Samoan national team. Stuart Fielden was omitted from the England squad but Calderwood, Higham and Gareth Hock all received places. Thomas Leuluai became the only Super League player from the 2008 season to win the World Cup when the New Zealand team he played hooker for defeated the Australian team 20–34 in the final.

Wigan played three friendly matches after the World Cup, the first being a 4–44 victory over Warrington Wolves at the Halliwell Jones Stadium during the traditional festive season, in which Riddell and Karl Pryce both made their first-team debuts. The Warriors played in a changed pink and black-hooped jersey in support of a local hospice, as Sam Tomkins completed a twenty-minute hat-trick, Richard Mathers and Pryce scored a double each, and Shaun Ainscough and Joel Tomkins also picked up one try apiece. The next match against Huddersfield Giants proved to be more difficult, as Carmont scored a last-minute try to hand Wigan a narrow victory at the Galpharm Stadium, with Riddell scoring two tries and Fielden being sin-binned in the first half. On the official opening on the new Leigh Sports Village and a week before the new Super League season began, the Warriors whitewashed their local rivals Leigh Centurions by 0–32 with a squad in which both new signings, Roberts and Riddell, were left out of.

LEGEND
Win
Draw
Loss

Opponent	Score	H/A	Date
Warrington Wolves	4–44	Away	28 December 2008
Huddersfield Giants	24–28	Away	25 January 2009
Leigh Centurions	0–32	Away	30 January 2009

== Season overview ==
=== February ===
Round 17 – Wakefield Trinity Wildcats

Date: 8 February
Venue: JJB Stadium
Referee: R Silverwood

Half-time: 0–10
Attendance: 14,377
RFL report

WIGAN 6–12 Wakefield

Tries: J Tomkins	Tries: D Halley (2)
Goals: P Richards	Goals: T Martin (2)

Wigan's season began on 8 February with a home defeat to a depleted Wakefield Trinity Wildcats side which only had seventeen players to fill their squad with due to injuries, and the death of Adam Watene during the off-season. Head coach Brian Noble blamed the result on a poor completion rate of 40%. Wakefield took an early lead after Dave Halley crossed the line in the first minute, before scoring again via the same player in the fourteenth minute to make a 0–12 initiative, following two successful conversions by Tony Martin. Joel Tomkins was introduced into the game in the second half as he scored a try which was converted by Pat Richards, but Wigan failed to score again. Richard Mathers, who was sent-off twice in 2008, was put into the sin-bin by the referee, Richard Silverwood, for the deliberate obstruction of Halley, and match ended in the first defeat for Wigan in their 2009 campaign.

Round 1 – Hull FC

Date: 13 February
Venue: KC Stadium
Referee: P Bentham

Half-time: 6–6
Attendance: 14,523
RFL report

Hull FC 18–10 WIGAN

Tries: R Horne, P Cusack, L Radford	Tries: P Richards, P Bailey
Goals: D Tickle (3)	Goals: P Richards

Prior to their next match, the Warriors announced a partnership with the University of Central Lancashire, as part of an effort to promote rugby league in the Preston area, in exchange for the student team at the university displaying the Wigan Warriors logo. This news was announced on the same day Mathers learned he would miss the next two matches for tripping Halley, including the club's next match against Hull F.C. which they lost at the KC Stadium. Hull FC started strongly, but Wigan scored first off a Tim Smith kick to Goulding and Phelps which eventually resulted in a try for Bailey. Richard Horne scored for Hull to level the scores at 6–6 before a last resort intervention from Kirk Yeaman denied Goulding a try. The scores were therefore level at half-time, and a kick from Smith resulted in another try for Richards who bettered his opposite winger, Mark Calderwood in the air. With four key players missing—Riddell, Phelps, Bailey and Richards—due to injury, Wigan tired in the final quarter allowing Chris Thorman and Peter Cusack to score late in the game to put the tie beyond the visiting team.

Round 2 – Castleford Tigers

Date: 20 February
Venue: JJB Stadium
Referee: S Ganson

Half-time: 6–16
Attendance: 12,079
RFL report Archived 25 February 2009 at the Wayback Machine

WIGAN 22–28 Castleford

Tries: K Pryce, D Goulding, S Ainscough, T Leuluai, J Tomkins	Tries: M Shenton, K Dixon, B Ferres (2), J Westerman
Goals: A Roberts	Goals: K Dixon (4)

With Mathers suspended and Cameron Phelps injured with a hamstring injury and two other injury concerns, Karl Pryce and Shaun Ainscough were given places in the initial 19-man squad to take on Castleford Tigers. A third defeat out of three matches came as Castleford won a ten try game 22–28, a result which meant Wigan's worst start to a season in twenty-four years. With Richards still missing due to injury, conversions proved to be the difference as both teams scored five tries apiece, but kickers Roberts and Riddell could only manage one successful kick whilst the Tigers' kicker Kirk Dixon managed four. Two disallowed Castleford tries in the first ten minutes were followed by two penalty goals by Dixon to give Castleford a 0–4 lead. Thomas Leuluai's effort gave Wigan a try before Joe Westerman put the Tigers ahead again after 34 minutes. Castleford scored again through Brett Ferres, with Dixon converting to give Castleford a 6–16 lead at half-time. Wigan scored first after the break thanks to a try from Karl Pryce, but this was unconverted and Castleford replied with two more of their own with Dixon and Ferres scoring his second try. Wigan started a fight back, initially through a Goulding try, and then again through Joel Tomkins. Ainscough marked his debut with a fifty-yard try to reduce the deficit to two points, but Michael Shenton's try sealed the victory for Castleford. Michael McIlorum was also cited and suspended by the Rugby Football League after the game for a dangerous throw on Mitchell Sargent. After failing to gain a point from the first three matches in the season, Noble's position as head coach was strengthened when Ian Lenagan publicly supported him, stating, "Brian is a very experienced coach and I'm sure we'll get this right. He has had bad starts to the season before, and he has good starts."

Round 3 – Harlequins Rugby League

Date: 28 February
Venue: Twickenham Stoop
Referee: T Alibert

Half-time: 10–6
Attendance: 3,883
RFL report Archived 2 March 2009 at the Wayback Machine

Harlequins RL 18–24 WIGAN

Tries: C Melling, M Gafa, C Randall, L McCarthy-Scarsbrook	Tries: A Roberts, P Bailey, G Carmont, S Ainscough (2)
Goals: D Orr	Goals: P Richards (2)

Wigan recorded their first win of the season with an 18–24 victory over Harlequins RL at the Twickenham Stoop in London. Ainscough scored his first of two tries after a break from Roberts down the wing, and it was converted by Richards who was playing at fullback as a replacement for Mathers who was omitted from the squad. Chad Randall punished Joel Tomkins' handling error for Harlequins' first try before Matt Gafa scored another try for the home side to make the half-time score 10–6. On his Super League debut, Sam Tomkins—Joel's younger brother—was involved in the build-up to Carmont's try after the second half had begun, and Bailey scored another try to put Wigan 10–14 ahead following two missed conversion attempts. A disallowed try for a knock-on by Will Sharp was followed by a knock-on from Carmont, before a 40-20 gave Louis McCarthy-Scarsbrook a chance to score a try in the 64th minute. Chris Melling restored a four-point lead for the home side with ten minutes left in the game after Harrison Hansen knocked-on. In the 75th minute, Randall's pass was intercepted by Roberts for an easy intercept try which Richards converted to give a two-point lead, which was increased to six as Ainscough scored the final try of the game.

=== March ===
Round 4 – Bradford Bulls

Date: 7 March
Venue: JJB Stadium
Referee: B Thaler

Half-time: 18–0
Attendance: 12,588
RFL report

WIGAN 44–10 Bradford
Tries: P Richards; G Carmont; I Palea'aesina; G Hock (2); H Hansen (2); Goals: P Richards (8)	Tries: R Sheriffe; S Menzies; Goals: P Deacon

The start of March was also the start of the reserve team's season, which begin with a comfortable win against Bradford Bulls. Richards scored twenty points including eight goals and a try as the first team earned their first home victory of the season, winning by a margin of thirty-four points. Richards scored the first of seven Wigan tries after nine minutes, before Hock broke the defensive line to put Wigan 12–0 ahead. Another line break from Hock provided an offload to Carmont who scored a third try. A twenty-point gap emerged as Richards kicked a penalty conceded by Paul Sykes, before Bradford scored their first of two tries through Rikki Sheriffe after 48 minutes. Hock replied by scoring his second try, before a line break by Riddell handed a try to Harrison Hansen. Wayne Godwin broke his leg after stopping an Iafeta Palea'aesina run, before Palea'aesina himself scored Wigan's final try. Steve Menzies scored his first Bradford try before the match ended.

Round 5 – Leeds Rhinos

Date: 13 March
Venue: Headingley Stadium
Referee: I Smith

Half-time: 22–6
Attendance: 17,677
RFL report Archived 14 March 2009 at the Wayback Machine

Leeds 34–10 WIGAN
Tries: S Donald; R Hall (2); R Burrow; K Leuluai; J Peacock; Goals: K Sinfield (5)	Tries: S Ainscough; G Hock; Goals: P Richards

Wigan's run of victories was short-lived as they lost the away tie to Leeds Rhinos immediately after. An unchanged Wigan side from the tie against Bradford could only score two tries, conceding six the other way. The victory was the Rhinos' fifth out of five matches, and they were ahead after three minutes thanks to a 40–20 which was converted into a try by Kylie Leuluai. An error from Ainscough proved costly as Scott Donald scored from the resulting turnover. Upon the half-hour mark, Leeds were 22–0 ahead after Rob Burrow touched down under the sticks and another 40–20 provided a try, this time for Ryan Hall. Ainscough scored Wigan's first try following a pass from Thomas Leuluai, before Wigan were disallowed another try after the video referee Phil Bentham ruled Sean O'Loughlin had obstructed Burrow. Hall scored his second, besting Roberts in the air, after fifty minutes. Peacock scored Leeds' sixth try, bursting through the defensive line, whilst Hock scored the last try of the game.

Round 6 – Salford City Reds

Date: 20 March
Venue: The Willows
Referee: G Hewer

Half-time: 6–22
Attendance: 7,016
RFL report

Salford 12–38 WIGAN
Tries: R Myler (2); Goals: J Turner; S Ratchford	Tries: P Richards; S Ainscough (2); S Tomkins (2); T Leuluai (2); Goals: P Richards (5)

An away tie to Salford City Reds was more favourable for Wigan as they eased to victory at The Willows. Salford had the first major chance of the game as a kick from the 18-year-old Richie Myler was knocked-on by Jeremy Smith. Carmont replied, catching an offload from former-Salford player Andy Coley, to hand a try to Ainscough. Myler again created an opportunity, but Karl Fitzpatrick was pushed into touch. A break via Ainscough and Riddell gave Leuluai a try, before Myler scored Salford's first try following a kick from Jeremy Smith. Sam Tomkins saw a hole in the defensive line and ran through it, scoring Wigan's third try, before Richards scored a fourth to make the half-time score 22–6. Wigan scored first again in the second half as Sam Tomkins scored from the half-way line, before Ainscough scored his second. Myler and Jeremy Smith again combined for the former's second try, this time from a pass, but Richards sealed the game for Wigan after offloading to Leuluai for his second and Wigan's seventh try. The win was dampened by the injury of Ireland international Eamon O'Carroll, who fractured his metatarsal bone during the reserve game against Salford.

Round 7 – Huddersfield Giants

Date: 27 March
Venue: JJB Stadium
Referee: P Bentham

Half-time: 4–10
Attendance: 11,670
RFL report

WIGAN 8–22 Huddersfield
Tries: A Roberts; P Bailey	Tries: M Lawrence; K Brown; S Moore; Goals: B Hodgson (5)

In a game that was 8–10 going into the final ten minutes, and had three players sent to the sin-bin, Wigan lost their third home game. Amos Roberts returned after being dropped to the reserves the week before, whilst the visiting Huddersfield team contained five former Wigan players. Brett Hodgson gave Huddersfield the initiative by kicking a penalty for a 0–2 lead, and Hock almost responded but knocked-on in the act of scoring a try. Bailey eventually scored a try for Wigan, but Richards failed to convert, and the score was made level after another kicked penalty from Brett Hodgson. Scott Moore gave Huddersfield the lead again after a run from dummy half to give a 4–10 lead, despite a take-out on Leuluai just before half-time which went unpenalised. Luke Robinson was sin-binned for delaying play and Roberts almost made the advantage count, but grounded the ball in touch and the try was disallowed. Darrell Griffin and Hansen were then sin-binned for a fight, before passing along the backs lead to a Roberts try, but Richards again failed to convert. Ainscough then fumbled a kick from Robinson, and Michael Lawrence punished the mistake by scoring a try for Huddersfield. Brown scored minutes later to put the game beyond Wigan.

=== April ===
Challenge Cup round 4 – Barrow Raiders

Date: 5 April
Venue: Craven Park
Referee: J Leahy

Half-time: 14–20
Attendance: 6,275
RFL report

Barrow 20–32 WIGAN
Tries: J Finch; J Nixon; L Campbell; Goals: P Noone (4)	Tries: S Ainscough (3); G Carmont (2); K Pryce; S Tomkins; Goals: M Riddell; A Roberts

The fourth round of the 2009 Challenge Cup occupied the first weekend of April, and for all Super League clubs this meant their first Challenge Cup ties. In March, Wigan learned that they would face an away tie to the Barrow Raiders, and it was expected this match would be held in front of the first sell-out crowd at Barrow's Craven Park for twenty-five years. The game itself was still in the balance fifteen minutes from time, with Barrow trailing Wigan by four points at 20–24, following a match which had seen a Shaun Ainscough hat-trick and Wigan's defensive frailties exploited again. The result pivoted on a forward pass decision which ruled out another Barrow try, minutes before Pryce scored a controversial try for Wigan in which he appeared to have knocked-on, with twelve minutes left to play. A try from Tomkins eventually sealed the win for Wigan to advance them into the fifth round of the competition.

Round 8 – St Helens RLFC

Date: 9 April
Venue: JJB Stadium
Referee: B Thaler

Half-time: 6–6
Attendance: 22,232
RFL report

WIGAN 12–19 St Helens
Tries: S Ainscough (2); Goals: A Roberts (2)	Tries: M Gidley; L Pryce; K Cunningham; Goals: P Wellens; K Eastmond (2); Drops: K Eastmond

On the day after, it was confirmed Martin Gleeson would transfer to Wigan from the Warrington Wolves, on a three-and-a-half-year contract. The signing came after Warrington had left Gleeson out of the squad which defeated York City Knights in their fourth round Cup tie, meaning Gleeson would be eligible to play for Wigan in future Cup games. Wigan were reported by the Wigan Evening Post to have spent £110,000 and given Richie Mathers in return for Gleeson. On the day after Gleeson's signing was announced, the draw for the Challenge Cup's fifth round took place. Wigan received an away tie to Wakefield Trinity Wildcats.

Gleeson featured in the first derby match of the year against St Helens RLFC. Ainscough put the home Wigan side ahead after nine minutes with a try on the wing, following a kick from Leuluai. Richards missed the conversion, and so Wigan only went four points ahead before St Helens replied with a try of their own through Keiron Cunningham, with Paul Wellens making the conversion. Hock had a try disallowed for a double movement, and later on a high tackle on Paleaaesina gave Roberts an opportunity to level the scores, with which he succeeded to draw the score at 6–6 at half time. Ainscough again carved out a lead for Wigan in the second half, and Roberts converted from the sideline. Two quick St Helens tries through Matt Gidley and Leon Pryce gave the visitors a 12–18 lead, and a Kyle Eastmond drop goal sealed the match for them.

Prior to their next match, Barrow Raiders confirmed that they had signed Lee Mossop on a month-long loan.

Round 9 – Catalans Dragons

Date: 13 April
Venue: Stade Gilbert Brutus
Referee: P Bentham

Half-time: 22–14
Attendance: 9,490
RFL report

Catalans 40–24 WIGAN
Tries: C Greenshields (2); D Pelo; G Bird; J Ryles (2); G Mounis; Goals: T Bosc (6)	Tries: P Richards; A Roberts; M Gleeson; S Ainscough; S Tomkins; Goals: P Richards (2)

Despite providing a close fight against St Helens, the club's visit to Perpignan for their away tie against Catalans Dragons ended in its third consecutive loss. The Dragons scored first through Dimitri Pelo's try in the second minute. Wigan scored fourteen points in return, with three tries from Roberts, Ainscough and Gleeson and one conversion for a 4–14 lead. A ten-point lead proved precarious as Catalans ran in thirty-six unanswered points, the first of them coming through a Greg Bird try. Grégory Mounis scored next, and Thomas Bosc kicked the conversion to give the home side the lead, and Jason Ryles gained another try before half-time. The Catalans fullback Clint Greenshields scored first after the break and also scored the next try. Ryles also scored a second try of his own to open a twenty-six-point deficit. Tomkins and Richards gave Wigan two late tries, but the match by then was all but finished.

Similarly to Mossop, Darrell Goulding completed a transfer to Salford City Reds on a month-long loan deal. After an extension to this deal in May, Goulding was to be eventually recalled on 7 July to cope with an injury crisis.

Round 10 – Celtic Crusaders

Date: 19 April
Venue: JJB Stadium
Referee: S Ganson

Half-time: 20–4
Attendance: 12,371
RFL report

WIGAN 44–10 Celtic
Tries: A Roberts; G Carmont; P Richards (2); M Riddell; S O'Loughlin (2); S Tomkins (2); Goals: A Roberts (2); P Richards (2)	Tries: L Dyer; M Dalle Cort; Goals: J Van Dijk

The club's next match was against newly promoted Crusaders, who had not won a match yet in the Super League season coming into this fixture. Celtic led after two minutes, when Luke Dyer pounced for a try after Phelps mistakenly let the ball bounce into the in-goal area. Richards replied with a try on the wing, before O'Loughlin gathered his own kick for a solo try to present a lead to the home Wigan side. Two more tries came for Wigan before half-time with Riddell and Roberts both scoring one each. Sam Tomkins scored not long after the break thanks to a run from Palea'asesina. Carmont stretched the lead further with a try of his own, and O'Loughlin scored his second try of the match. Damien Quinn was sin-binned in his 100th competitive appearance for the Crusaders—Marshall Chalk was also sin-binned later on. Richards claimed his second try almost instantly after Quinn's dismissal. Mark Dalle Cort scored a late Celtic try and captain Jace Van Dijk successfully converted, but Wigan had another try before the game ended, with Sam Tomkins grounding his second try of the match—his team's ninth—to complete a convincing victory for the home side.

Transfer news occupied the break between this win and the Warriors' second league match against Wakefield Trinity Wildcats. The Wigan Evening Post reported that the club, as well as Leeds Rhinos, were interested in signing Richie Myler from Salford City Reds, although neither club were successful in their approaches to the player. Warrington Wolves would eventually sign Myler later in the year. Meanwhile, Thomas Leuluai extended his contract with the club for a further three years.

Round 11 – Wakefield Trinity Wildcats

Date: 26 April
Venue: Belle Vue
Referee: B Thaler

Half-time: 20–22
Attendance: 5,521
RFL report

Wakefield 26–40 WIGAN
Tries: D Blanch (2); D Brough (2); Goals: D Brough (5)	Tries: M Gleeson; C Phelps (2); S Ainscough (4); Goals: P Richards (6)

George Carmont had to be replaced at short notice prior to kick-off against the club's next opponents, Wakefield Trinity Wildcats. Shaun Ainscough was recalled to take his place in the team, and scored four tries to give his side a second consecutive win. Wakefield, like Celtic, put the first points on the scoreboard after Damien Blanch received a kick from Danny Brough for a try on the wing, with Brough converting for a 6–0 lead. Tim Smith linked with Cameron Phelps, who was switched from fullback to center in Carmont's absence, for Wigan's first try. Phelps turned provider as his work gave Ainscough two tries in nine minutes for a 6–16 lead, before Wigan's indiscipline gave Brough a penalty and a try following a handling error from the stand-in fullback, Pat Richards. Ainscough scored again on the wing to complete his hat-trick, but Wakefield replied after Brough intercepted a pass from Martin Gleeson and returned 45 metres for his second try to make the scores 20–22 at half time. Wakefield took the lead shortly after the break as Blanch took advantage of Ainscough's weak defence for his second try. This was Wakefield's last try of the match, as Phelps gathered a kick from Smith to score a try next to the posts which Richards converted successfully. Riddell was injured with a hamstring, and despite Wakefield pressure, Wigan scored again as a run from Sam Tomkins led to another try for Ainscough—his sixteenth in ten matches. Gleeson scored in the final ten minutes to put the game beyond the home side's reach.

=== May ===
Round 12 – St Helens RLFC

Date: 2 May
Venue: Murrayfield Stadium
Referee: S Ganson

Half-time: 24–6
Attendance: 29,627
RFL report

WIGAN 38–18 St Helens
Tries: P Richards (2); T Leuluai; G Hock; S O'Loughlin; J Tomkins; Goals: P Richards (7)	Tries: P Wellens; L Pryce; S Long; Goals: S Long (2); K Eastmond

Ahead of their 2009 Magic Weekend fixture against St Helens RLFC, Thomas Leuluai learned that he would not be called up to play in the 2009 ANZAC Test, news which was welcomed by Brian Noble, who stated that New Zealand had, "enough southern hemisphere-based Kiwis to cope." Leuluai instead took membership of a Wigan side which recorded its third successive league win at Murrayfield Stadium over a St Helens RLFC side including James Graham, who had complained earlier in the week about the event's location being too far away. Wigan had lost to St Helens at the Magic Weekend event in 2007 and 2008, 34–18 and 57–16 respectively, but it was Wigan's captain Sean O'Loughlin who scored the game's first try after seven minutes. Pat Richards scored the match's second try following a kick from O'Loughlin, and added both conversions to give Wigan a 12–0 lead. This was further extended after Gareth Hock scored after 29 minutes. Sean Long gained a try back for St Helens as his grubber kick rebounded off Leuluai, before a break from Sam Tomkins fed his older brother Joel for a try just before half time. Two minutes after the break, Wigan kicked a penalty to stretch the lead to 26–6, and Wigan ended any hope of a St Helens comeback as Leuluai scored following a break down the wing from Richards. St Helens scored the next two tries through Leon Pryce and Paul Wellens, with Long kicking both conversions, but Richards scored his second try and kicked the conversion to take his personal haul to twenty-two, and end the match 38–18. With Noble's contract due to expire at the end of the season, Ian Lenagan praised him for Wigan's biggest derby win in six years over St Helens, but refused to offer any assurances about Noble's future at the club, after Bradford Bulls refuted a claim that they wanted to replace Steve McNamara with Noble.

Challenge Cup round 5 – Wakefield Trinity Wildcats

Date: 9 May
Venue: Belle Vue
Referee: P Bentham

Half-time: 11–16
Attendance: 4,883
RFL report

Wakefield 17–28 WIGAN
Tries: J Demetriou; T Leo-Latu; T Martin; Goals: D Brough (3); Drops: D Brough	Tries: G Carmont; M McIlorum; C Phelps; S Fielden; S Tomkins; Goals: P Richards (4)

For the next match, the players again returned to Belle Vue, two weeks after their league win. The Wakefield Trinity Wildcats were coached by John Kear, twice a winner of the Cup as a head coach, most recently in 2005 with Hull FC, and in 1998 when his Sheffield Eagles side defeated Wigan 17–8 in the final, three years after Wigan's last of a record eight consecutive Challenge Cup final victories. The match did not start in Wigan's favour, as Danny Brough provided passes to Jason Demetriou and Tevita Leo-Latu, and kicked a conversion to give the Wildcats a 10–0 lead. Wigan went in ahead at half time though. Wigan got their first points with a try on the wing from Richards, and then another try from Michael McIlorum following a Gareth Hock pass. Brough kicked a drop-goal to give Wakefield a point lead, but Cameron Phelps scored a third Wigan try after Sean O'Loughlin broke the line from his own half. Wakefield went ahead for the third time twelve minutes after the break, with a grubber kick from Brough being gathered by Tony Martin. Stuart Fielden then scored his first try in two years before Sam Tomkins finished the game with a try of his own making. The fourth goal of the match meant the final scores were 17–28; a win for Wigan which advanced them to the quarter-finals. The day after, the draw for the next round to be played three weeks later was made, with Wigan receiving a home tie against Salford City Reds.

Round 13 – Hull Kingston Rovers

Date: 15 May
Venue: JJB Stadium
Referee: R Silverwood

Half-time: 6–6
Attendance: 13,415
RFL report

WIGAN 12–20 Hull KR

Tries: S O'Loughlin (2)	Tries: J Webster, P Cooke, M Dobson
Goals: P Richards (2)	Goals: M Dobson (4)

Following a run of four games, the club's next match was against Hull Kingston Rovers. Their preparations were boosted by news that Sam Tomkins would not receive a match ban for his conduct against Wakefield in the Challenge Cup tie. Goulding extended his loan spell at Salford City Reds, but with a condition that Wigan could recall him with 24 hours notice. The match seemed to be heading towards a 6–0 lead for Wigan at half-time, after Sean O'Loughlin scored a try and Richards kicked a goal, but a controversial try scored by Michael Dobson after the hooter had sounded was awarded by the referee, Richard Silverwood. Incensed, Wigan started the second half with another converted try from the captain, O'Loughlin, but this was to be their final score of the match. Paul Cooke collected his own kick for a solo try, and Jake Webster put Hull KR into the lead, with Dobson kicking both goals for a six-point advantage. A late penalty was kicked by Dobson for another two ponts, concluding the match in favour of Hull KR. The match ended Wigan's run of four victories, and placed Hull KR temporarily at the top of the Super League XIV table.

Round 14 – Warrington Wolves

Date: 22 May
Venue: Halliwell Jones Stadium
Referee: B Thaler

Half-time: 4–6
Attendance: 10,718
RFL report

Warrington 16–8 WIGAN

Tries: C Riley, M King, M Monaghan	Tries: C Phelps
Goals: C Bridge (2)	Goals: P Richards (2)

Following his loan spell at Barrow, Lee Mossop transferred to Huddersfield Giants on a month-long loan. Prior to Wigan's next match against Warrington Wolves, Noble, whose contract at Wigan was due to expire at the end of 2009, publicly admitted that he was becoming impatient with the lack of an offer from the club to extend his contract, after reports in the Sydney Morning Herald linked him to a coaching role at Sydney Roosters. Wigan had not won a game in Warrington since 2003, and despite leading for over half the match, failed to break this record. Warrington successfully charged down two kicks, before a kick from Thomas Leuluai on the third set of six tackles lead to Cameron Phelps scoring the match's opening try. Poor discipline from Ben Westwood gave a penalty, and Wigan almost took advantage when Joel Tomkins was held up over the try-line in the act of scoring by former Wigan full-back, Richie Mathers. Wigan again launched the next attack after forcing a goal line drop out, but a try from Amos Roberts was disallowed because of a knock-on by Pat Richards. Warrington then applied a sustained twenty minute period of pressure, but errors from Westwood and Briers kept them off the scoresheet. Briers weighted his next kick better, with Matt King out-jumping Shaun Ainscough to score Warrington's first try. Bridge's missed conversion meant that Wigan lead 6–4 at half-time, and a penalty kicked by Richards early in the second half meant that this lead was increased by two points. Warrington gained the lead after 55 minutes after Chris Riley punished Stuart Fielden and Andy Coley for giving away successive penalties with a try in the corner. Michael Monaghan shimmied past three Wigan defenders to finish the game off with another Warrington try.

Challenge Cup Quarter-final – Salford City Reds

Date: 29 May
Venue: JJB Stadium
Referee: T Alibert

Half-time: 10–6
Attendance: 9,466
RFL report

WIGAN 28–6 Salford

Tries: G Hock (2), P Richards (3)	Tries: L Adamson
Goals: P Richards 4	Goals: J Wilshere

Tim Smith had been left out of the tie against Warrington owing to a family illness, and did not return from his home country, Australia, in time for Wigan's Challenge Cup tie against Salford City Reds, but George Carmont returned from injury. Fielden was also forced to miss the game, after receiving a one-match ban for raising a knee in a tackle during the defeat to Warrington. Without Smith and Fielden, Wigan comprehensively beat Salford City Reds 28–6 to advance to the semi-finals stage of the tournament. Gareth Hock gave the home side the lead, before Salford equalised with a try from Luke Adamson. Wigan replied by taking the lead with a George Carmont try, and could have scored again after Hock broke the line, but Sam Tomkins knocked-on. Another knock-on, this time from Richards, denied Wigan another try. Salford launched repeated attacks on the Wigan line early in the second half, through Mark Henry and Stefan Ratchford, before Willie Talau was pushed into touch by Sam Tomkins. A penalty from Richards added two more points to Wigan's total, and he soon scored his second try, followed by his third on 70 minutes for his second hat-trick in a Wigan jersey. Hock scored the final try, his second, after Tomkins had come close, to finish the game in favour of the Warriors. Wigan therefore entered their first Challenge Cup semi-final since 2007, when they were defeated by Catalans Dragons at the Halliwell Jones Stadium in Warrington, and it was Warrington Wolves who were drawn as their 2009 semi-final opponents.

=== June ===
Round 15 – Salford City Reds

Date: 5 June
Venue: JJB Stadium
Referee: I Smith

Half-time: 28–6
Attendance: 11,550
RFL report

WIGAN 34–18 Salford
Tries: G Carmont; P Richards (2); T Smith; M Riddell; H Hansen; Goals: P Richards (5)	Tries: M Henry; M Alker; L Swain; Goals: J Wilshere

Round 16 – Celtic Crusaders

Date: 13 June
Venue: Brewery Field
Referee: S Ganson

Half-time: 12–6
Attendance: 5,253
RFL report

Celtic 22–16 WIGAN
Tries: M Dalle Cort; J Van Dijk; P Lupton; Goals: M Lennon (3)	Tries: A Roberts; C Phelps; H Hansen; Goals: P Richards (2)

Round 18 – Hull Kingston Rovers

Date: 28 June
Venue: New Craven Park
Referee: T Alibert

Half-time: 16–14
Attendance: 9,007
RFL report

Hull KR 28–36 WIGAN
Tries: P Fox (2); J Webster; M Vella; D Fitzhenry; Goals: M Dobson (4)	Tries: P Bailey (2); G Carmont; P Richards (2); H Hansen; S Tomkins; Goals: P Richards (4)

=== July ===
Round 19 – Harlequins RL

Date: 3 July
Venue: JJB Stadium
Referee: S Ganson

Half-time: 24–6
Attendance: 14,977
RFL report Archived 8 July 2009 at the Wayback Machine

WIGAN 40–12 Harlequins RL
Tries: A Roberts; K Pryce; G Carmont; P Richards; T Leuluai (2); M Riddell; J Tomkins; Goals: P Richards (4)	Tries: L Gale; M Gafa; Goals: D Orr (2)

Round 20 – Catalans Dragons

Date: 10 July
Venue: JJB Stadium
Referee: B Thaler

Half-time: 10–12
Attendance: 11,543
RFL report

WIGAN 24–22 Catalans
Tries: A Roberts; D Goulding; G Carmont; P Richards (2); Goals: P Richards (2)	Tries: S Bell; D Pelo; O Elima; G Bird; Goals: T Bosc (3)

Round 21 – Bradford Bulls

Date: 19 July
Venue: Grattan Stadium
Referee: R Silverwood

Half-time: 0–6
Attendance: 9,487
RFL report

Bradford 14–20 WIGAN
Tries: C Nero; J Donaldson; Goals: P Deacond (3)	Tries: A Roberts; M Gleeson; P Richards; J Tomkins; Goals: P Richards (2)

Round 22 – Leeds Rhinos

Date: 24 July
Venue: JJB Stadium
Referee: P Bentham

Half-time: 6–10
Attendance: 20,295
RFL report

WIGAN 28–10 Leeds
Tries: G Carmont; S Tomkins; J Tomkins; H Hansen; Goals: P Richards (6)	Tries: S Donald; D McGuire; Goals: K Sinfield

Round 23 – St Helens RLFC

Date: 31 July
Venue: GPW Recruitment Stadium
Referee: B Thaler

Half-time: 4–6
Attendance: 15,563
RFL report Archived 9 January 2011 at the Wayback Machine

St Helens 10–6 WIGAN
Tries: M Gidley; K Eastmond; Goals: K Eastmond	Tries: S Tomkins; P Richards

=== August ===
Challenge Cup Semi-final – Warrington Wolves

Date: 8 August
Venue: Stobart Stadium Halton
Referee: S Ganson

Half-time: 8–28
Attendance: 12,975
RFL report

WIGAN 26–39 Warrington
Tries: P Bailey; S Tomkins; A Coley; T Leuluai; Goals: P Richards (5)	Tries: M King (3); L Anderson; L Briers; M Cooper; C Hicks; Goals: C Bridge (5)

Round 24 – Warrington Wolves

Date: 14 August
Venue: DW Stadium
Referee: R Silverwood

Half-time: 22–4
Attendance: 13,452
RFL report

WIGAN 36–16 Warrington
Tries: C Phelps; A Roberts; M Gleeson; G Carmont (2); P Richards; T Leuluai; Goals: P Richards (4)	Tries: V Anderson; C Riley; C Bridge; Goals: C Bridge (2)

Round 25 – Castleford Tigers

Date: 23 August
Venue: The Jungle
Referee: S Ganson

Half-time: 8–16
Attendance: 6,574
RFL report

Castleford 26–29 WIGAN
Tries: M Shenton; K Dixon (2); B Ferres; D Widders; Goals: K Dixon; J Westerman (2)	Tries: S Tomkins (3); T Leuluai (2); Goals: P Richards (4); Drops: S Tomkins

=== September ===
Round 26 – Hull FC

Date: 4 September
Venue: DW Stadium
Referee: B Thaler

Half-time: 10–6
Attendance: 12,491
RFL report

WIGAN 34–22 Hull FC
Tries: A Roberts (2); G Carmont (2); S Tomkins; I Palea'aesina; Goals: P Richards (5)	Tries: C Hall; T Briscoe; R Horne; D Tickle; Goals: C Hall; D Tickle (2)

Round 27 – Huddersfield Giants

Date: 13 September
Venue: Galpharm Stadium
Referee: I Smith

Half-time: 18–10
Attendance: 8,988
RFL report

Huddersfield 48–16 WIGAN
Tries: B Hodgson; L Cudjoe (3); P Whatuira; D Hodgson; S Lunt (2); Goals: B Hodgson (8)	Tries: P Richards; J Tomkins; M Flanagan; Goals: P Richards (2)

EPO – Castleford Tigers

Date: 20 September
Venue: DW Stadium
Referee: I Smith

Half-time: 12–0
Attendance: 8,689
RFL report

WIGAN 18–12 Castleford
Tries: A Roberts; G Carmont; H Hansen; Goals: P Richards (3)	Tries: C Huby; J Westerman; Goals: J Westerman (2)

PSF – Hull Kingston Rovers

Date: 26 September
Venue: New Craven Park
Referee: R Silverwood

Half-time: 0–18
Attendance: 8,162
RFL report

Hull KR 16–30 WIGAN
Tries: P Fox; K Welham; C I'Anson; Goals: M Dobson (2)	Tries: M Gleeson (2); G Carmont; P Richards; I Palea'aesina; Goals: P Richards (5)

=== October ===
QSF – St Helens RLFC

Date: 3 October
Venue: GPW Recruitment Stadium
Referee: S Ganson

Half-time: 10–6
Attendance: 13,087
RFL report

St Helens 14–10 WIGAN
Tries: F Meli (2); S Long; Goals: K Eastmond	Tries: G Carmont; P Richards; Goals: P Richards

== Transfers ==
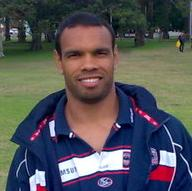
Amos Roberts, one of two pre-season signings made by Wigan.

=== Transfers in ===
Pos	Name	From	Date	Notes
HK	Mark Riddell	Parramatta Eels	14 May 2008
WG	Amos Roberts	Sydney Roosters	22 January 2009
CE	Martin Gleeson	Warrington Wolves	6 April 2009

=== Transfers out ===
Pos	Name	To	Date	Notes
SO	Trent Barrett	Cronulla Sharks	5 June 2008
WG	Mark Calderwood	Hull	11 September 2008
HK	Mickey Higham	Warrington Wolves	15 September 2008
WG	Liam Colbon	Hull Kingston Rovers	18 September 2008
FB	Richie Mathers	Warrington Wolves	6 April 2009

=== Loans out ===
Pos	Name	To	Date from	Until	Notes
SR	Lee Mossop	Barrow Raiders	9 April 2009	9 May 2009
SR	Lee Mossop	Huddersfield Giants	19 May 2009	19 June 2009
SR	Lee Mossop	Huddersfield Giants	19 June 2009	7 July 2009
CE	Darrell Goulding	Salford City Reds	14 April 2009	14 May 2009
CE	Darrell Goulding	Salford City Reds	14 May 2009	7 July 2009

== Player statistics ==
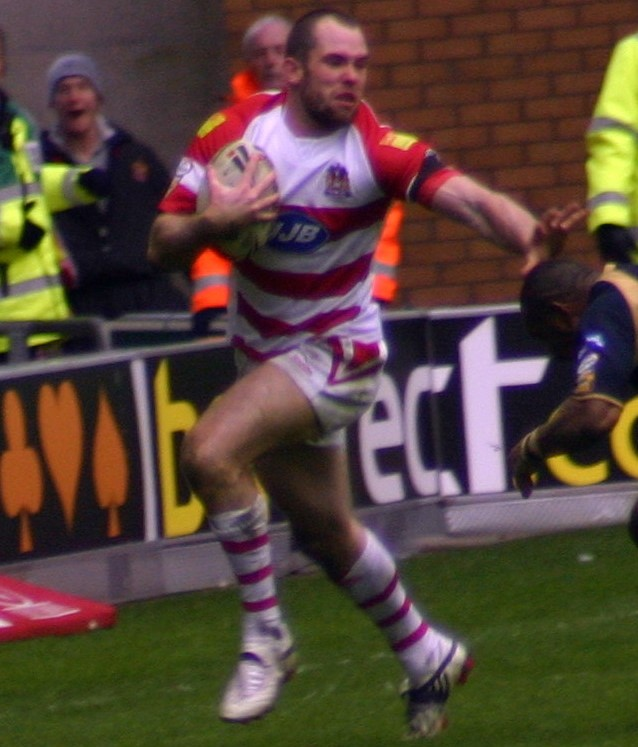
Pat Richards, Wigan's leading try and goal scorer for 2009.

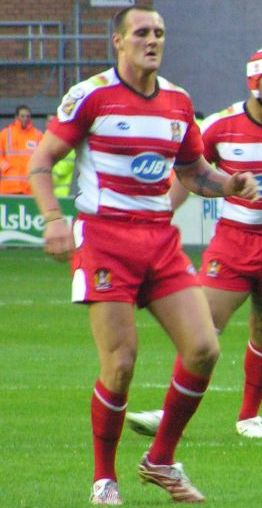
Gareth Hock, who was suspended for testing positive for cocaine in 2009.

- Numbers in parentheses represent number of appearances as an interchange.
- For players who have performed in more than one unique positions, the most frequent is used.

2009 Wigan Warriors season player statistics (Correct as of 3 October)
No.	Pos.	Name	Apps		Tries		Goals		Drops		Totals		Disciplinary		Notes
No.	Pos.	Name	SL	CC	SL	CC	SL	CC	SL	CC	Apps	Pts	Temporarily suspended	Red card	Notes
1	FB	Richard Mathers	1	0	0	0	0	0	0	0	1	0	1	0	
2	WG	Amos Roberts	29	4	12	0	5	1	0	0	33	60	0	0	
3	CE	Darrell Goulding	6 _{(3)}	1 _{(1)}	2	0	0	0	0	0	7 _{(4)}	8	0	0	
4	CE	George Carmont	26	4	15	3	0	0	0	0	30	72	0	0	
5	WG	Pat Richards	28	3	20	3	89	13	0	0	31	296	0	0	
6	SO	Tim Smith	12 _{(1)}	2 _{(1)}	1	0	0	0	0	0	14 _{(2)}	4	0	0	
7	SH	Thomas Leuluai	30	4	9	1	0	0	0	0	34	40	1	0	
8	PR	Stuart Fielden	30 _{(17)}	2 _{(1)}	0	1	0	0	0	0	32 _{(18)}	4	0	0	
9	HK	Mark Riddell	28 _{(3)}	3	3	0	0	1	0	0	31 _{(3)}	14	0	0	
10	PR	Iafeta Palea'aesina	30 _{(27)}	4 _{(3)}	2	0	0	0	0	0	34 _{(30)}	8	0	0	
11	SR	Gareth Hock	15	2	4	2	0	0	0	0	17	24	0	0	
12	SR	Phil Bailey	18	4	5	1	0	0	0	0	22	24	0	0	
13	LF	Sean O'Loughlin (c)	25	4	5	0	0	0	0	0	29	20	0	0	
14	SR	Joel Tomkins	29 _{(10)}	4 _{(3)}	7	0	0	0	0	0	33 _{(13)}	28	0	0	
15	PR	Andy Coley	29 _{(4)}	4 _{(1)}	0	1	0	0	0	0	33 _{(5)}	4	1	0	
16	SR	Harrison Hansen	26 _{(9)}	3 _{(1)}	7	0	0	0	0	0	29 _{(10)}	28	1	0	
17	HK	Michael McIlorum	17 _{(12)}	2 _{(1)}	0	1	0	0	0	0	19 _{(13)}	4	0	0	
19	SR	Paul Prescott	24 _{(7)}	4 _{(1)}	0	0	0	0	0	0	28 _{(8)}	0	0	0	
20	WG	Karl Pryce	6 _{(2)}	1	2	1	0	0	0	0	7 _{(2)}	12	0	0	
21	FB	Cameron Phelps	23	3	5	1	0	0	0	0	26	24	0	0	
22	CE	Martin Gleeson	19	3	6	0	0	0	0	0	22	24	0	0	
23	PR	Eamon O'Carroll	6 _{(4)}	0	0	0	0	0	0	0	6 _{(4)}	0	0	0	
24	SR	Lee Mossop	9 _{(9)}	1 _{(1)}	0	0	0	0	0	0	10 _{(10)}	0	0	0	
25	SO	Sam Tomkins	23 _{(5)}	4 _{(1)}	12	3	0	0	1	0	27 _{(6)}	61	1	0	
26	HK	Mark Flanagan	10 _{(7)}	1 _{(1)}	1	0	0	0	0	0	11 _{(8)}	4	0	0	
28	WG	Shaun Ainscough	11	1	13	3	0	0	0	0	12	64	0	0	

== Fixtures ==
LEGEND
Win
Draw
Loss

=== Super League ===
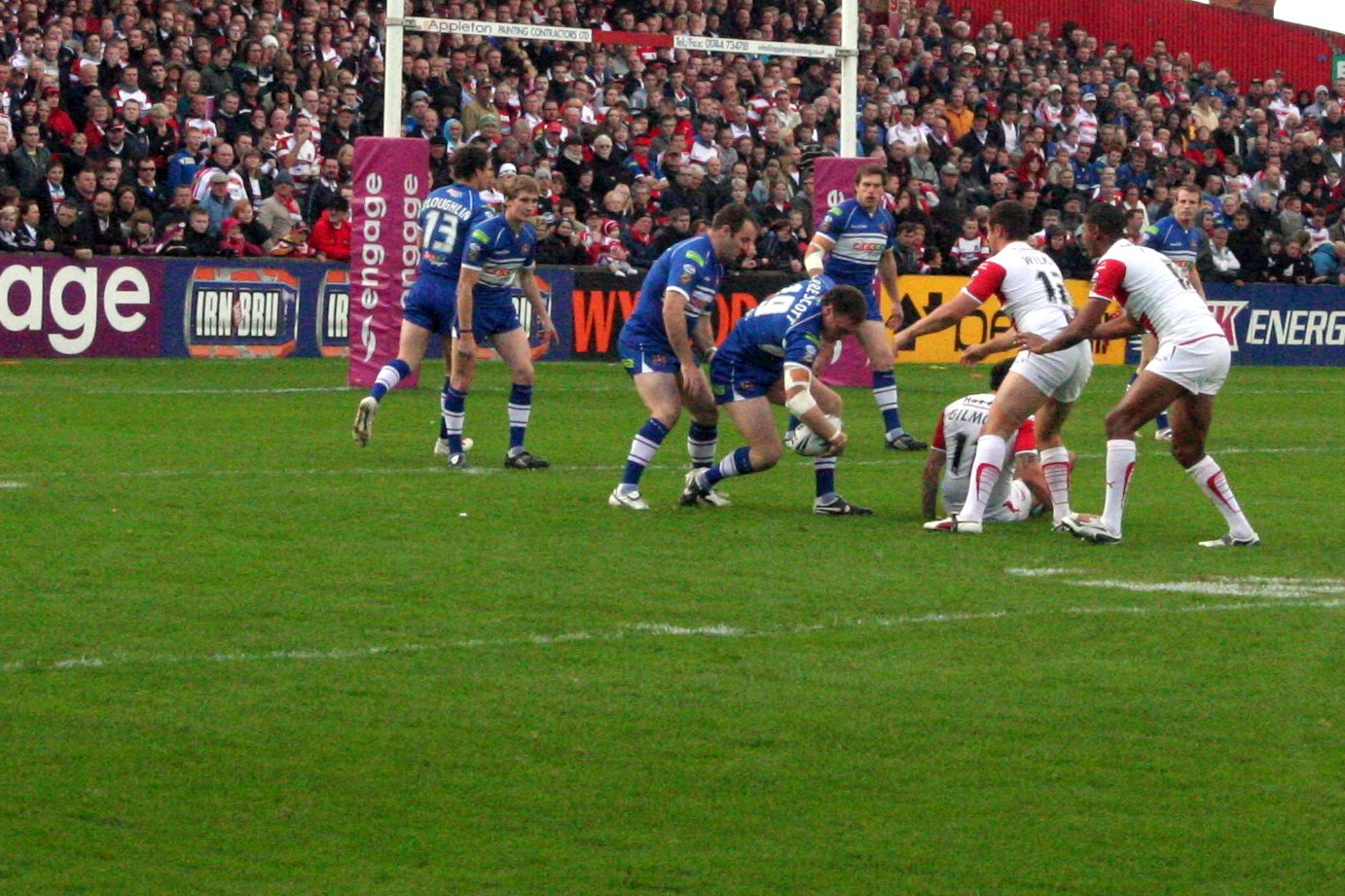
Wigan vs St Helens in the Super League XIV

Round	Opponent	Score	H/A	Attendance	Date
17	Wakefield Trinity Wildcats	6–12	Home	14,377	8 February 2009
1	Hull	18–10	Away	14,523	13 February 2009
2	Castleford Tigers	22–28	Home	12,079	20 February 2009
3	Harlequins RL	18–24	Away	3,883	28 February 2009
4	Bradford Bulls	44–10	Home	12,588	6 March 2009
5	Leeds Rhinos	34–10	Away	17,677	13 March 2009
6	Salford City Reds	12–38	Away	7,016	20 March 2009
7	Huddersfield Giants	8–22	Home	11,670	27 March 2009
8	St Helens R.F.C.	12–19	Home	22,232	9 April 2009
9	Catalans Dragons	40–24	Away	9,490	13 April 2009
10	Crusaders	44–10	Home	12,371	19 April 2009
11	Wakefield Trinity Wildcats	26–40	Away	5,521	26 April 2009
12	St Helens RLFC	38–18	Neutral	29,627	3 May 2009
13	Hull Kingston Rovers	12–20	Home	13,415	15 May 2009
14	Warrington Wolves	16–8	Away	10,718	24 May 2009
15	Salford City Reds	34–18	Home	11,550	5 June 2009
16	Celtic Crusaders	22–16	Away	5,253	13 June 2009
18	Hull Kingston Rovers	28–36	Away	9,007	28 June 2009
19	Harlequins RL	40–12	Home	14,977	3 July 2009
20	Catalans Dragons	24–22	Home	11,543	10 July 2009
21	Bradford Bulls	14–20	Away	9,487	19 July 2009
22	Leeds Rhinos	28–10	Home	20,295	24 July 2009
23	St Helens RLFC	10–6	Away	15,563	31 July 2009
24	Warrington Wolves	36–16	Home	13,452	14 August 2009
25	Castleford Tigers	22–29	Away	6,574	23 August 2009
26	Hull FC	34–22	Home	12,491	4 September 2009
27	Huddersfield Giants	48–16	Away	8,988	13 September 2009
EPO	Castleford Tigers	18–12	Home	8,689	20 September 2009
PSF	Hull Kingston Rovers	16–30	Away	8,162	26 September 2009
QSF	St Helens RLFC	14–10	Away	13,087	3 October 2009

=== Challenge Cup ===
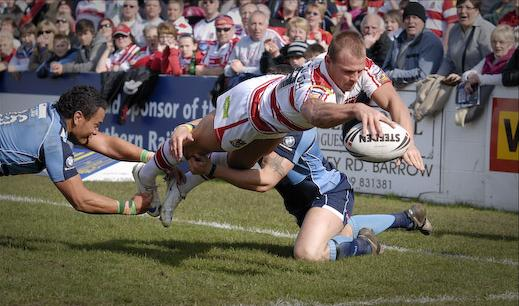
Shaun Ainscough, scoring against Barrow Raiders

Round	Opponent	Score	H/A	Attendance	Date
4	Barrow Raiders [C]	20–32	Away	6,275	5 April 2009
5	Wakefield Trinity Wildcats [SL]	17–28	Away	4,883	9 May 2009
QF	Salford City Reds [SL]	28–6	Home	9,466	29 May 2009
SF	Warrington Wolves [SL]	26–39	Neutral	12,975	8 August 2009

== League table ==
Pos	Team	Pld	W	D	L	PF	PA	PD	Pts	Qualification
1	Leeds Rhinos (L, C)	27	21	0	6	805	453	+352	42	Play-offs
2	St Helens	27	19	0	8	733	466	+267	38	Play-offs
3	Huddersfield Giants	27	18	0	9	690	416	+274	36	Play-offs
4	Hull Kingston Rovers	27	17	1	9	650	516	+134	35	Play-offs
5	Wakefield Trinity Wildcats	27	16	0	11	685	609	+76	32	Play-offs
6	Wigan Warriors	27	15	0	12	659	551	+108	30	Play-offs
7	Castleford Tigers	27	14	0	13	645	702	−57	28	Play-offs
8	Catalans Dragons	27	13	0	14	613	660	−47	26	Play-offs
9	Bradford Bulls	27	12	1	14	653	668	−15	25	
10	Warrington Wolves	27	12	0	15	649	705	−56	24	
11	Harlequins	27	11	0	16	591	691	−100	22	
12	Hull F.C.	27	10	0	17	502	623	−121	20	
13	Salford City Reds	27	7	0	20	456	754	−298	14	
14	Celtic Crusaders	27	3	0	24	357	874	−517	6	

Source: Rugby League Project
Rules for classification: 1) Points; 2) Points difference; 3) Number of points scored;
(C) Champions; (L) League Leaders' Shield Winners

== Notable moments ==
- Friday 13 February – Wigan lose their second successive game of the season losing 18–10 to Hull FC making it Wigan's worst start to a Super League season since the 2006 season.
- Friday 20 February – Nineteen-year-old Shaun Ainscough and former Gloucester rugby union player Karl Pryce make their Super League débuts for Wigan.
- Friday 20 February – Wigan lose their third successive game of the season after being beaten 28–22 by Castleford Tigers. It is Wigan's worst start to a season in 24 years.
- Saturday 28 February – Sam Tomkins makes his début for Wigan against Harlequins RLFC.
- Saturday 28 February – Wigan get their first win of the Super League XIV season by beating Harlequins RL twenty-four points to eighteen at the Twickenham Stoop
- Sunday 5 April – Wigan defeat Barrow Raiders 32–20 to progress in the Challenge Cup.
- Monday 6 April – Wigan sign Martin Gleeson from Warrington Wolves for a fee of £100,000+.
- Monday 6 April – Wigan release Richie Mathers who later signs for Warrington Wolves.
- Thursday 9 April – First time during the Super League era that a Wigan verses St Helens match is played on a Thursday night.
- Thursday 9 April – Wigan lose 19–12 to St Helens at the JJB Stadium in the first Wigan verses St Helens derby of Super League XIV.
- Wednesday 15 April – Darrell Goulding is released on loan to the Salford City Reds and Lee Mossop joins the Barrow Raiders on loan.
- Sunday 19 April – The first ever match between Wigan Warriors and Celtic Crusaders ends with Wigan winning 44–10.
- Saturday 2 May – First 'Magic Weekend' at Murrayfield Stadium in Scotland where Wigan beat local rivals St Helens by 38 points to 18.
- Saturday 9 May – Wigan defeat Wakefield Trinity Wildcats 28–17 to progress to the quarter-finals of the Challenge Cup.
- Monday 18 May – Lee Mossop joins Super League team Huddersfield Giants on loan.
- Friday 22 May – A 16–8 defeat against Warrington Wolves at the Halliwell Jones Stadium means Wigan have still never won at the Halliwell Jones Stadium in a competitive match. A record stretching back 6 years and including a 36–24 defeat to Catalans Dragons in a Challenge Cup Semi-final.
- Friday 29 May – Wigan beat Salford City Reds 28–6 to progress to the semi-finals of the Challenge Cup.
- Saturday 13 June – Mark Flanagan makes his Super League début for Wigan.
- Saturday 13 June – Wigan's first game at Brewery Field ends in a 22–16 defeat. It is also the first time Wigan have lost to the Celtic Crusaders.
- Tuesday 23 June – Gareth Hock tests positive for Benzoylecgonine, a metabolite of cocaine and is provisionally suspended by the Rugby Football League.
- Friday 24 July – In a match marketed as 'The BIG One' 20,295 people watch Wigan beat Leeds at the JJB Stadium which is the highest attendance between the two teams in Super League.
- Friday 24 July – Wigan play their last match at the JJB Stadium before its official re-branding to the DW stadium on 1 August 2009.
- Friday 31 July – Wigan's five game unbeaten run comes to an end with a 10–6 defeat to local rivals St Helens.
- Saturday 8 August – Wigan are knocked out of the Challenge Cup by a 39–26 defeat to Warrington Wolves.
