= 2010 Wigan Warriors season =

- Super League XV champions
- Super League XV Rank: 1st
- Play-off result: Won Grand Final (St Helens R.F.C. 22–10)
- Challenge Cup: Lost quarter final (Leeds Rhinos 12–10)
- 2010 record: Wins: 24; draws: 0; losses: 6
- Points scored: For: 922; against: 411

Team information
- Chairman: Ian Lenagan
- Head coach: Michael Maguire
- Captains: Sean O'Loughlin; George Carmont; Thomas Leuluai; Andy Coley; Phil Bailey; Joel Tomkins
- Stadium: DW Stadium
- Avg. attendance: 15,793 (▲12.1%)
- High attendance: 22,701 (Warrington, 16 July)

Top scorers
- Tries: Pat Richards (25)
- Goals: Pat Richards (123)
- Points: Pat Richards (246)
← 2009	List of seasons	2011 →

The 2010 Wigan Warriors season is the club's fifteenth season in the Super League, since its launch in 1996. Wigan Warriors entered the season following their sixth-placed league finish and subsequent play-off knock-out in the 2009 Super League season, as well as their semi-final knock-out in the 2009 Challenge Cup. The 2010 season is the eleventh year in which rugby league has been played at the town's DW Stadium.

Michael Maguire started in his position as the new head coach of the club during this season, following Brian Noble's departure. It is also the first season for Paul Deacon, who signed for the club in November 2009. It was the first season in which the captaincy of the team was allocated through a newly formed leadership team of five players (later expanded to six players).

The season covers the period between 1 November 2009 and 31 October 2010. following three pre-season friendlies, the season started officially with the 38–6 victory over Crusaders RL at the DW Stadium in the Super League XV round 1 fixture on Friday 5 February 2010.

== Background ==
Wigan Warriors' 2009 Challenge Cup campaign ended at the penultimate stage after they lost to Warrington Wolves in the semi-final at Widnes' Stobart Stadium Halton. The club finished sixth in the Super League XIV table, meaning they qualified for the season's play-offs, but in failing to defeat St Helens R.F.C. in their final play-off match, the club's 2009 season ended. Immediately after the match, head coach Brian Noble confirmed that he would be leaving the club via mutual consent with the chairman, Ian Lenagan, at the end of the season for the same post at Crusaders after John Dixon's contract was not extended. The club also confirmed this shortly afterwards, and in a press conference a week later, the incumbent head coach Michael Maguire was unveiled. Although a former assistant coach at Melbourne Storm in the National Rugby League (NRL) competition, the post at Wigan was Maguire's first experience as head coach.

As with all Super League licensees, the club continued to operate under the league's salary cap which remained unchanged from 2009's GBP£1.65 million limit. As an ever-present club in the Super League format, this season was Wigan Warriors' fifteenth year in the competition, and its second year under the licensing system after the club received a 'B' graded licence. It was the eleventh year of rugby league at the DW Stadium, which the club shares with Wigan Athletic F.C., since its opening in 1999.

== Pre-season ==
The international rugby league season took place between the 2009 and 2010 seasons, with the Four Nations being held in England and France, as well as a warm-up test match against Wales at Bridgend's Brewery Field. Two Wigan Warriors players—captain Sean O'Loughlin and debutant Sam Tomkins—were initially called up for the England squad. Sam Tomkins scored three times and assisted in a further two tries as England defeated Wales. O'Loughlin was forced to withdraw because of a fractured bone in his thumb. Sam Tomkins did not play during England's Four Nations opener against France the week after, but received a starting place against Australia and New Zealand. Thomas Leuluai played hooker for New Zealand, but his Four Nations ended when defeat by England in the final weekend of round robin fixtures meant that England qualified for the final instead of his New Zealand team. Sam Tomkins featured in the final, where England capitulated in the final twenty minutes to finish the tournaments as runners-up. In addition to the Four Nations, the 2009 European Cup also took place across Europe, with Pat Richards playing for an Ireland team which failed to make the event's final. Harrison Hansen continued his Samoa career by playing in the 2009 Pacific Cup qualifying stage. The eventual winners, Papua New Guinea, were coached by Adrian Lam, a former Wigan player.

Wigan had already lost one player before the end of the 2009 season, when Mark Flanagan signed for NRL side Wests Tigers. In late October, George Carmont extended his contract by a year with an additional clause for a possible second year. Two days after the Four Nations final, the club started their transfers with the signing of Wigan-born Paul Deacon, who had spent the last twelve years at Bradford Bulls and led them as captain. Deacon signed as a player for the 2010 season, but also joined as an assistant coach to mentor Sam Tomkins, with the intention of becoming a full-time coach in 2011. A rumour linking James Graham to Wigan amongst other clubs ended after Graham stated he expected to remain at local rivals, St Helens R.F.C. for the coming season. Phil Bailey extended his contract at the club by another year, ending at the close of the 2010 season. Aside from academy products, Deacon was the only player acquired by the club during the off-season, and squad numbers were given on 8 December 2009.

Elsewhere, former Great Britain and Wigan player Kris Radlinski was promoted from his role in Wigan Warriors Youth Development to the new post of rugby general manager at the club, in an assistance role to Maguire. The deadline given to Leganan from the Rugby Football League (RFL) by which he was forced to sell a certain amount of his shares in fellow Super League club, Harlequins RL, was extended owing to the harsh economic climate during the later third of the Noughties. In early February, Wigan announced that Thomas Leuluai, Andy Coley, George Carmont and Phil Bailey would join former captain Sean O'Loughlin in the newly formed leadership team.

On 18 November, the RFL published a full list of fixtures for the 2010 season, and the club learned that its opening Super League fixture would be against Brian Noble's new club, Crusaders RL. The draw for the Magic Weekend fixtures was also made later in the same day, with Huddersfield Giants becoming the resulting opponents. Catalans Dragons requested that their home game against Wigan Warriors be moved to Montpellier as part of their attempts to spread rugby league in the south of France, but Wigan declined this, claiming it was unfair on fans who had already spent money in anticipation of the game being held at Catalans' usual home ground in Perpignan.

Michael Maguire's first match as head coach was abandoned before kick-off. The pre-season friendly was due to be played on 27 December at St Helens RLFC's Knowsley Road, but icy weather over the Christmas period forced safety concerns. Belle Vue therefore became the venue of Maguire's first match as head coach, which itself ended in a come-from-behind 38–40 victory for Wigan against Wakefield Trinity Wildcats. A youthful Wigan team containing only Shaun Ainscough and Chris Tuson with any top-flight experience was beaten by Leigh Centurions, a match in which assistant coach Shaun Wane took charge in place of Maguire. Deacon featured for his debut in Wigan's final pre-season friendly—a 12–20 victory for Wigan against Warrington Wolves in Paul Wood's testimonial match.

Legend
Win
Draw
Loss

Opponent	Score	H/A	Date
St Helens R.F.C.	A–A	Away	27 December 2009
Wakefield Trinity Wildcats	38–40	Away	17 January 2010
Leigh Centurions	16–14	Away	24 January 2010
Warrington Wolves	12–20	Away	27 January 2010

== Season review ==
As with all Super League XV clubs, the regular season consists of 27 rounds of fixtures against the other thirteen clubs, once home and once away, as well as their Magic Weekend fixture. For Wigan Warriors, this was against Huddersfield Giants. Finishing the regular season in the top eight places means entering the play-offs for those teams concerned, potentially an additional four matches, including the Grand Final itself. The club will also compete in the 2010 Challenge Cup, entering in the fourth round.

=== February ===
An Amos Roberts brace gave Wigan their first win of the season in the opening round against Crusaders RL, who were led by the Warriors' former head coach Brian Noble. Roberts ran in another two tries as Wigan comfortably won their second match of the season against Hull Kingston Rovers, although Cameron Phelps sustained an ankle injury and was ruled out for up to four weeks. A regathered kick chipped into space by Sam Tomkins set up a move which culminated in his brother Joel Tomkins scoring the match-winning try, to register Wigan's first win against Warrington Wolves at the Halliwell Jones Stadium since it opened in 2004. Adverse weather conditions across the United Kingdom meant Wigan could not travel to Neath to play their friendly match against South Wales Scorpions. Pat Richards scored five tries and nine goals to break the club's record for most points by a player in a single match, breaking Andy Farrell's previous record of thirty-two points, as Wigan whitewashed Catalans Dragons 58–0 to maintain their perfect start to the season.

At the start of February, two Wigan players—Shaun Ainscough and Liam Farrell—were loaned out to Widnes Vikings on a dual-registration arrangement. Ben Davies also moved to Widnes on a three-month loan. On 15 February, the club's president Peter Higginbottom died aged 66. Following criticism about the condition of the DW Stadium's pitch from Wigan Athletic's manager Roberto Martínez, the football club announced it would dig up and relay the surface after the rugby league match against Catalans Dragons, despite the Warriors' head coach Maguire stating he thought the pitch was "pretty good" and looked "alright" to him. Ainscough moved from his dual-registration with Widnes to a month-long loan with Castleford Tigers.

=== March ===
In the first match of March, a Matt Orford brace helped to overturn a 0–20 deficit for the Bradford Bulls, meaning Wigan suffered their first loss of the season and the last perfect record of Super League XV fell. Darrell Goulding and Sam Tomkins scored two tries each as Hull F.C. struggled to cope with Wigan's front-row and consequently the Warriors moved two points clear at the top of the league table. Castleford were beaten at The Jungle, as Roberts' good form continued with his first hat-trick for Wigan in two seasons, joining Richards as the league's leading try scorer with ten in seven games. An injury-stricken Leeds Rhinos side were then beaten by Wigan, with Goulding scoring two tries against the defending Super League champions. Having already missed the games against Castleford and Leeds, Harrison Hansen was confirmed as having been injured with a torn shoulder muscle, and was ruled out for up to three months.

Following their loss to Wigan, Castleford signed a month-long loan with Chris Tuson, who made his second first-grade appearance for the Warriors against them. Ainscough's loan at Castleford was extended to last the rest of the season. Joel Tomkins was given a formal caution for using knees in a tackle on Danny Buderus. Lee Mossop quashed rumours that he may leave Wigan for a career in the NRL by signing a five-year contract extension, due to expire at the end of the 2014 season.

=== April ===
St Helens R.F.C. fought back in an attempt to overturn a 0–14 deficit at half-time, but Wigan held on with two second-half penalties from Richards to win the final Good Friday derby at the Saints' Knowsley Road. Wigan followed this up on Easter Monday with a 54–14 win over Wakefield Trinity Wildcats, although Roberts sustained a cruciate knee ligament injury and was expected to be out for approximately eight weeks. Richards scored two tries as Wigan comfortably completed a sixth successive win over Salford City Reds. In Wigan's first Challenge Cup fixture of the season, a Richie Barnett hat-trick for the Sheffield Eagles threatened to repeat the Warriors' infamous defeat by them in the 1998 Challenge Cup final, but Sam Tomkins scored a hat-trick of his own to ease Wigan into the fifth round. The seven-match winning streak came to an end, as Harlequins RL rallied from 24–6 down to beat Wigan 26–38.

Dual-registration deals were signed with Whitehaven for Josh Veivers and Stefan Marsh. Ainscough was recalled from his season-long loan at Castleford as Wigan's injury list grew. The 2007 and 2009 NRL league titles that Maguire had earned as assistant coach with the Melbourne Storm were stripped after it was discovered the club had cheated, using secret payments to break the league's salary cap. Tuson's loan at Castleford was extended on a week-by-week basis, while Ainscough was loaned back out again to Widnes. Davies' loan with Widnes was also extended to a dual-registration arrangement.

=== May ===
The Magic Weekend took place at the start of May, and Wigan's win against the Huddersfield Giants took them two points clear again at the top of the table. Sam Tomkins and Karl Pryce both scored hat-tricks as an injury-hit Widnes side—unable to use loanees Ainscough, Farrell and Davies—proved unable to match Wigan in their fifth round cup match at the Stobart Stadium. Huddersfield lost to Wigan again in an ill-tempered match at the Galpharm Stadium, despite two sin-binnings for the Warriors and a David Hodgson hat-trick for the Giants. Pryce claimed four tries and Martin Gleeson scored twice as Wigan beat Crusaders 26–46. However, Wigan's cup campaign came to end in the quarterfinal stage on a rain-soaked Headingley pitch, thanks to a last-minute Lee Smith try which handed victory to Leeds.

Sean O'Loughlin received a formal caution for a high tackle on Luke Robinson, despite the Huddersfield head coach Nathan Brown believing the foul deserved a two-month ban. Gleeson was dropped by the club for their second match of the month against Huddersfield due to an unidentified breach of discipline.

=== June ===
On returning to league action following their cup knock-out to Leeds, a Goulding hat-trick helped Wigan make their lead at the top of table more secure with a win over Castleford. Both of the Tomkins brothers as well as O'Loughlin were called up to play for England against France on 12 June, and all three played in a win over Wakefield in the league the next day, although O'Loughlin had been withdrawn after ten minutes with a strain to his quadriceps. A late comeback was not enough to overturn a 12–26 deficit against St Helens, as the Warriors lost their first league match since Harlequins in April. Sam Tomkins made his first appearance at fullback, where he was to stay for the rest of the season, as Wigan won against Harlequins thanks to a Richards brace.

Mick Hogan was appointed as the new chief executive at rugby union side Sale Sharks, moving from a similar role he had occupied at Wigan since 2008. Mark Riddell announced his intentions to return home to Australia at the end of the season to be with his ill mother.

=== July ===
Two tries from Clint Greenshields of the Catalans Dragons were not enough for victory as Wigan replied with five tries of their own to keep a four-point lead in the league table. O'Loughlin returned from injury to score a try as Wigan defeated Salford by fifty points, helped by a hat-trick from Goulding and a brace from Sam Tomkins. In the first Super League game broadcast in 3D display, Wigan lost to Warrington, a result which reduced their lead in the league table to two points with five games remaining. However, the team responded by whitewashing Hull at the KC Stadium a week later, with Richards scoring his third hat-trick of the season, while Warrington's loss to Catalans in the same weekend restored Wigan's four-point advantage. In July's final fixture, Wigan defeated Leeds in an ill-disciplined match, with Carl Ablett and Ryan Bailey both being put on report for the Rhinos.

Andy Coley received a red-card against Catalans and consequently picked up a two-match ban. The club signed eight of its academy players on professional contracts. Following the salary cap breaches at Melbourne which stripped them of their 2007 and 2009 titles, Ryan Hoffman was released to join Wigan on a twelve-month contract, and was followed by Brett Finch and Jeff Lima, with all three joining the squad for the 2011 season. Joel Tomkins was charged with a late tackle against Warrington but did not receive any match ban. Maguire returned home to Australia during July to be with his gravely ill father, meaning Shaun Wane, the assistant coach, took control of the matches against Hull and Leeds.

=== August ===
As the Challenge Cup semi-finals were played over the first weekend of August, Wigan's first team had a week off, although Mossop was ruled out for the rest of the season after suffering a shoulder injury during an under-20s match. The team returned to action on 16 August with a home fixture against Huddersfield, and squandered a chance to secure the League Leader's Shield for sure, losing 16–18. A win at Craven Park against Hull Kingston Rovers meant that Wigan could no longer be caught at the top of the league table at four points ahead with only one game left, and consequently, the Warriors won the League Leader's Shield for the first time in ten years, their first trophy since 2002. The final weekend of August was occupied with the Challenge Cup final, meaning Wigan had another week away from action.

Davies was named in the Welsh national squad for their international fixtures during the autumn. The club featured in the Carnegie Floodlit Nines competition for the first time, and beat Bradford 20–16 in the final to win the tournament. Riddell's departure from the club was confirmed, as well as the release of Phil Bailey and Iafeta Paleaaesina whose contracts were due to run out at the end of the 2010 season and were not renewed. Ainscough, who featured in the Flootlit Nines victory, was signed by Bradford for the 2011 season.

=== September ===
Wigan won their final match of the regular rounds against Bradford, but with the League Leader's shield already won, all eyes were on Richards as he attempted to break several records. With two tries, he broke the club record for most tries in a Super League season, bringing his tally to twenty-nine and breaking Kris Radlinski's previous record of twenty-eight. It placed him at third in the overall Super League records, behind Danny McGuire's thirty-five tries and Lesley Vainikolo's thirty-six, both achieved in 2004. With three goals as well, Richards also equalled the league record for most points in a season, matching Andy Farrell's 2001 record of 388. The win meant that Wigan ended the regular season with twenty-two wins and five losses, beating their nearest rivals in St Helens and Warrington to the top of the table by four points. By virtue of this, they would play fourth-placed Leeds in the first weekend of the playoffs.

A drop-goal from Kevin Sinfield proved the difference as Wigan lost their first playoff match in controversial circumstances, as in the final minute of the game, McGuire took out Carmont and Scott Donald took out Richards as Wigan were breaking down the left wing, foul play which injured McGuire's knee and ruled him out for the rest of the playoffs, and gave Wigan a penalty from forty metres out which would have won the game had Richards not missed it. The consequence of defeat by Leeds was a match against Hull Kingston Rovers, with the Warriors missing Deacon due to a groin injury received during the previous match. However, despite being behind twice during the match at 6–12 and 12–14, Wigan eventually overcame Hull Kingston Rovers 42–18 to place themselves into the playoff semi-finals. With St Helens choosing to play Huddersfield in other semi-final match, Wigan were left with an away trip to face Leeds again. With a 6–26 victory, it was Wigan this time who won, ending Leeds' three-year run as Super League champions, with the result placing Wigan into the Grand Final where they would face St Helens.

Leuluai was announced in the New Zealand preliminary squad for the 2010 Four Nations. Stuart Fielden and Andy Coley both signed new contracts to keep them at Wigan, for two years and one year respectively. Four Wigan players were announced in the Super League Dream Team for 2010: Richards, O'Loughlin and both of the Tomkins brothers. Two days after Wigan had defeated Leeds for a place in the Grand Final, it was confirmed that Terry Newton, the former Wigan player who had been banned in February for testing positive for human growth hormone while playing for Wakefield, had been discovered dead at his home near Wigan. The death was later given an open verdict rather than one of suicide by the coroner, due to doubts over Newton's mental state at the time of his death.

=== October ===
2010 was Wigan's fourth appearance in a Grand Final, three less than their opponents and local derby rivals St Helens, who held the record for most finals and were playing at Old Trafford for the fifth consecutive time having lost the previous three finals to Leeds. Wigan's most previous final had been the defeat by Bradford in 2003, and O'Loughlin was the only survivor in 2010 from the team that played that day. Compared to St Helens' Grand Final record of four wins from seven, Wigan's record was poor, with their only Super League championship after the playoffs were introduced coming in 1998 against Leeds. With the league's statistically best defence in Wigan opposing the league's best attack in St Helens, and the top two teams from the regular season league table playing each other, the final was deemed by several commentators as a close match to call.

The match was preceded with a minute's silence to Newton. Wigan earned the early advantage with the former St Helens player, Gleeson, scoring the game's opening try after three minutes following an Iosia Soliola knock-on. Deacon continued to put St Helens under pressure with threatening kicks to Richards, but it was Gleeson who scored his and Wigan's second try thanks to a move that started in the Warriors' half with Sam Tomkins and Deacon. Another Deacon kick was not properly controlled by St Helens, and Goulding touched down an easy try in the sixteenth minute. Richards scored his second goal with the conversion attempt, but did not last the first half as he suffered an injury to his Achilles tendon which ended his participation in the final. After coming close to a try through Matty Smith, St Helens eventually replied through Andrew Dixon to reduce the margin to ten points at half-time.

Richards' injury cost Wigan points, as Riddell, the stand-in kicker, missed two relatively easy penalty attempts. However, Sam Tomkins scored the first try of the second half on the right wing, with Riddell managing to successfully kick the conversion. Liam Farrell also had a try disallowed for obstruction, before St Helens scored their second try of the match through Francis Meli. It was the final try of the game though, as Wigan managed to run down the clock without conceding again to win their first Grand Final in twelve years. The 22–10 victory meant Wigan were crowned Super League XV champions.

In addition to O'Loughlin and the Tomkins brothers who played against France earlier in the season, Fielden and Goulding were both selected to join the England squad in the post-season 2010 Four Nations tournament. It confirmed the day after the Grand Final that the injury Richards had sustained meant that he would be out of action for at least five to six months, which included the post-season international matches as well as the start of the next season, although Richards stated, "If I'd known that would happen and we'd still end up winning, I'd have taken it."

== Fixtures ==
LEGEND
Win
Draw
Loss

=== Super League ===
Round	Opponent	Score	H/A	Attendance	Date
1	Crusaders RL	38–6	Home	13,680	5 February 2010
2	Hull Kingston Rovers	32–6	Home	12,429	12 February 2010
3	Warrington Wolves	20–22	Away	13,024	20 February 2010
4	Catalans Dragons	58–0	Home	12,001	26 February 2010
5	Bradford Bulls	22–20	Away	9,244	5 March 2010
6	Hull F.C.	48–24	Home	15,045	12 March 2010
7	Castleford Tigers	22–36	Away	8,493	21 March 2010
8	Leeds Rhinos	24–4	Home	17,883	26 March 2010
9	St Helens R.F.C.	10–18	Away	17,500	2 April 2010
10	Wakefield Trinity Wildcats	54–14	Home	14,615	5 April 2010
11	Salford City Reds	4–18	Away	6,618	11 April 2010
12	Harlequins RL	26–48	Home	18,605	23 April 2010
13	Huddersfield Giants	28–10	Neutral	25,401	2 May 2010
14	Huddersfield Giants	30–38	Away	8,390	16 May 2010
15	Crusaders RL	26–46	Away	6,075	22 May 2010
16	Castleford Tigers	38–22	Home	14,047	6 June 2010
17	Wakefield Trinity Wildcats	6–48	Away	6,937	13 June 2010
18	St Helens RLFC	24–26	Home	20,498	20 June 2010
19	Harlequins RL	12–36	Away	5,084	26 June 2010
20	Catalans Dragons	16–34	Away	7,612	4 July 2010
21	Salford City Reds	60–10	Home	12,221	9 July 2010
22	Warrington Wolves	16–23	Home	22,701	16 July 2010
23	Hull	0–46	Away	12,694	23 July 2010
24	Leeds Rhinos	12–26	Away	16,622	30 July 2010
25	Huddersfield Giants	16–18	Home	13,619	15 August 2010
26	Hull Kingston Rovers	18–38	Away	9,250	22 August 2010
27	Bradford Bulls	34–12	Home	17,058	3 September 2010
QPO	Leeds Rhinos	26–27	Home	9,987	12 September 2010
PSF	Hull Kingston Rovers	42–18	Away	11,133	17 September 2010
QSF	Leeds Rhinos	6–26	Away	13,693	25 September 2010
Final	St Helens RLFC	10–22	Neutral	71,526	2 October 2010

=== Challenge Cup ===
Round	Opponent	Score	H/A	Attendance	Date
4	Sheffield Eagles [C]	34–50	Away	2,950	17 April 2010
5	Widnes Vikings [C]	10–62	Away	5,504	8 May 2010
QF	Leeds Rhinos [SL]	10–12	Away	9,242	29 May 2010

== League table ==
Pos	Team	Pld	W	D	L	PF	PA	PD	Pts	Qualification
1	Wigan Warriors (L, C)	27	22	0	5	922	411	+511	44	Play-offs
2	St Helens	27	20	0	7	946	547	+399	40	Play-offs
3	Warrington Wolves	27	20	0	7	885	488	+397	40	Play-offs
4	Leeds Rhinos	27	17	1	9	725	561	+164	35	Play-offs
5	Huddersfield Giants	27	16	1	10	758	439	+319	33	Play-offs
6	Hull F.C.	27	16	0	11	569	584	−15	32	Play-offs
7	Hull Kingston Rovers	27	14	1	12	653	632	+21	29	Play-offs
8	Celtic Crusaders	27	12	0	15	547	732	−185	24	Play-offs
9	Castleford Tigers	27	11	0	16	648	766	−118	22	
10	Bradford Bulls	27	9	1	17	528	728	−200	19	
11	Wakefield Trinity Wildcats	27	9	0	18	539	741	−202	18	
12	Salford City Reds	27	8	0	19	448	857	−409	16	
13	Harlequins	27	7	0	20	494	838	−344	14	
14	Catalans Dragons	27	6	0	21	409	747	−338	12	

Source: Rugby League Project
Rules for classification: 1) Points; 2) Points difference; 3) Number of points scored;
(C) Champions; (L) League Leaders' Shield Winners

== Transfers ==
=== Transfers in ===
Pos	Name	From	Date	Notes
SH	Paul Deacon	Bradford Bulls	16 November 2009	Also joined as assistant coach.

=== Transfers out ===
Pos	Name	To	Date	Notes
LF	Mark Flanagan	Wests Tigers	24 September 2009

== Notable moments ==
- Sunday 17 January – Wigan play their first ever match under head coach Michael Maguire in a friendly against Wakefield Trinity Wildcats, Wigan winning 40–38.
- Friday 5 February – Paul Deacon makes his Wigan début.
- Friday 5 February – Wigan win their first match of Super League XV beating Crusaders Rugby League 38–6.
- Saturday 20 February – Wigan record their first ever competitive win at the Halliwell Jones Stadium with a 22–20 win over the Warrington Wolves.
- Friday 26 February – Wigan defeat Catalans Dragons 58–0 the first time Wigan have nil an opposition in Super League since 2007 when they defeated Catalans Dragons 30–0.
- Friday 5 March – Wigan lose their first competitive match with Michael Maguire has coach when they lose to Bradford Bulls 22–20.
- Tuesday 9 March – Wigan coach Michael Maguire is awarded Coach of the Month for February 2010.
- Friday 2 April – Wigan beat local rivals St Helens 10–18 in the last Wigan versus St Helens derby to be played at Knowsley Road.
- Monday 5 April – Liam Farrell makes his first team début.
- Saturday 17 April – Wigan defeat Sheffield Eagles by 50–34 to advance to the next round of the Challenge Cup.
- Sunday 2 May – Stefan Marsh makes his first team début.
- Saturday 8 May – Wigan defeat Widnes Vikings 64–10 to advance to quarter finals of the Challenge Cup.
- Saturday 29 May – Wigan are knocked out of the Challenge Cup after losing 10–12 to Leeds Rhinos.
- Saturday 12 June – Wigan players Sean O'Loughlin, Sam Tomkins and débutante Joel Tomkins play for England in a 66–12 win over France.
- Monday 28 June – Wigan's first television advertisement is aired on ITV.
