= 2010 Super League season =

Rugby competition

Super League XV
- League: Super League
- Duration: 27 Rounds
- Teams: 14
- Lowest attendance: 2,330; Harlequins vs Catalans Dragons (14 February)
- Average attendance: 9,615
- Total attendance: 990,439
- Broadcast partners: Sky Sports; Nine Network; Orange Sport; America One; Sport Klub

2010 season
- Champions: Wigan Warriors; 2nd Super League title 19th British title
- League Leaders: Wigan Warriors
- Runners-up: St. Helens
- Man of Steel: (Republic of Ireland) Pat Richards
- Top point-scorer: (Republic of Ireland) Pat Richards (388)
- Top try-scorer: (Republic of Ireland) Pat Richards (29)

Engage Super League XV was the official name for the 2010 Super League season. Fourteen teams competed over 27 rounds. The season officially kicked off on 5 February with the Crusaders versus the Leeds Rhinos on 29 January at Crusaders' new homeground at the Racecourse Ground in Wrexham. Crusaders halfback Michael Witt scored the first points of the season with a penalty goal and the Rhinos came away with the first competition points, posting a 34 to 6 victory.

The season came to a conclusion with Wigan Warriors beating St. Helens 22-10 in the Super League Grand Final on 2 October with two tries for Martin Gleeson.

== Teams ==
Super League XV was the second year of a licensed Super League. Under this system, promotion and relegation between Super League and National League One was abolished, and 14 teams were granted licences subject to certain criteria. All twelve teams from Super League XIII were given places, as well as former Super League team Salford City Reds and Crusaders.

Geographically, the vast majority of teams in Super League are based in the north of England, four teams – Warrington, St. Helens, Salford and Wigan – to the west of the Pennines in Cheshire, Greater Manchester and Merseyside, and seven teams to the east in Yorkshire – Huddersfield, Bradford, Wakefield Trinity, Leeds, Castleford, Hull F.C. and Hull Kingston Rovers. Catalans Dragons are the only team based in France and are outside of the United Kingdom. Crusaders are the only team in Wales, and Harlequins are the only team to be based in a capital city (London).

Team	Stadium	Capacity	City/Area
Bradford Bulls (2010 season)	Grattan Stadium, Odsal	27,000	Bradford, West Yorkshire
Castleford Tigers (2010 season)	The Jungle	11,750	Castleford, West Yorkshire
Catalans Dragons (2010 season)	Stade Gilbert Brutus	10,000	Perpignan, Pyrénées-Orientales, France
Crusaders (2010 season)	The Racecourse Ground	15,000	Wrexham, Clwyd, Wales
Harlequins (2010 season)	Twickenham Stoop	12,700	Twickenham, London
Huddersfield Giants (2010 season)	Galpharm Stadium	24,544	Huddersfield, West Yorkshire
Hull F.C. (2010 season)	Kingston Communications Stadium	25,404	Kingston upon Hull, East Riding of Yorkshire
Hull Kingston Rovers (2010 season)	"New" Craven Park	9,471	Kingston upon Hull, East Riding of Yorkshire
Leeds Rhinos (2010 season)	Headingley Carnegie Stadium	22,250	Leeds, West Yorkshire
Salford City Reds (2010 season)	The Willows	11,363	Salford, Greater Manchester
St Helens R.F.C. (2010 season)	The GPW Recruitment Stadium	17,500	St Helens, Merseyside
Wakefield Trinity Wildcats (2010 season)	Belle Vue	12,600	Wakefield, West Yorkshire
Warrington Wolves (2010 season)	Halliwell Jones Stadium	14,206	Warrington, Cheshire
Wigan Warriors (2010 season)	DW Stadium	25,138	Wigan, Greater Manchester

Reigning champions

== Rules ==
=== Rule changes ===
The RFL announced two new rule interpretations intended to increase player safety in the tackle:

- Referees now call "held" if one of the ball-carrier's legs is lifted by a defender in a tackle in which the participants are stood upright. Previously, a referee would only declare the tackle complete if both legs had been lifted.
- Referees now call held as soon as they see the ball-carrier being dragged by more than one defender. This prevents groups of defenders dragging an opponent into touch or the in-goal area.

=== Operational rules ===
The 'club trained player rule' entered its third year and made a planned adjustment:

- Clubs would be required to include a minimum of seven players, an increase from six players, who have come through their academy or are under 21 years old in their 25-player first team squads. British clubs were required to have twelve United Kingdom-trained players, an increase from eleven, and no more than six overseas-trained players, a decrease from eight.
- Crusaders were granted dispensation to include up to fourteen overseas-trained players for the 2010 season as the Welsh club is considered to be still developing.

== Results ==
=== Season summary ===
January

- 29 - Leeds Rhinos win the first game of 2010 against a new look Crusaders 34-6 in a snow filled Racecourse Ground, Wrexham. This match set a home record attendance for Crusaders of 10,334, which is also a record attendance for a Welsh rugby league fixture on home soil.

February

- 17 - Wakefield Trinity Wildcats hooker Terry Newton is provisionally suspended by the UK Anti-Doping Agency after testing positive for a banned substance
- 22 - Wakefield Trinity Wildcats cancelled the contract of Terry Newton following his two-year ban from rugby for taking the self-administered human growth hormone HGH, later that year Newton died in his home in Orrell.
- 26 - Wigan Warriors equal Warrington's record win of the season with a 58-0 win of their own, this time against Catalans Dragons with 3 tries of Pat Richards' 38 point haul coming in the first 20 minutes of the game
- 28 - Leeds Rhinos lose the 2010 World Club Challenge 18-10 against the Melbourne Storm

April

- 1 - The first draw of Super League XV is recorded when Leeds and Bradford drew 20 - 20 at Headingley Carnegie
- 2 - St Helens are defeated 10 - 18 by Wigan Warriors in the last local derby match to be played between the two sides at Knowsley Road

May

- 1 - Warrington Wolves record the biggest win of the season with a 16-68 victory against Salford City Reds at the Magic Weekend at Murrayfield
- 15 - Salford City Reds produce a shock 42-34 victory over St. Helens at The Willows in a 'repeat' of last year's game there.

August

- 22 - Wigan Warriors secured the League Leaders' Shield with an 18-38 victory at Hull Kingston Rovers

September

- 4 - St. Helens beat Castleford Tigers 40-30 in the final ever league game at Knowsley Road. Captain Keiron Cunningham sealed the win with a last minute try - A score which moved St Helens above Warrington into 2nd place on points difference alone, meaning the Saints will host Warrington in the playoffs the following week.

October

- 2 - Wigan Warriors won their first title since 1998 with a 22-10 win over rivals St Helens in the Grand Final at Old Trafford.

== Table ==
Pos	Team	Pld	W	D	L	PF	PA	PD	Pts	Qualification
1	Wigan Warriors (L, C)	27	22	0	5	922	411	+511	44	Play-offs
2	St Helens	27	20	0	7	946	547	+399	40	Play-offs
3	Warrington Wolves	27	20	0	7	885	488	+397	40	Play-offs
4	Leeds Rhinos	27	17	1	9	725	561	+164	35	Play-offs
5	Huddersfield Giants	27	16	1	10	758	439	+319	33	Play-offs
6	Hull F.C.	27	16	0	11	569	584	−15	32	Play-offs
7	Hull Kingston Rovers	27	14	1	12	653	632	+21	29	Play-offs
8	Celtic Crusaders	27	12	0	15	547	732	−185	24	Play-offs
9	Castleford Tigers	27	11	0	16	648	766	−118	22	
10	Bradford Bulls	27	9	1	17	528	728	−200	19	
11	Wakefield Trinity Wildcats	27	9	0	18	539	741	−202	18	
12	Salford City Reds	27	8	0	19	448	857	−409	16	
13	Harlequins	27	7	0	20	494	838	−344	14	
14	Catalans Dragons	27	6	0	21	409	747	−338	12	

Source: Rugby League Project
Rules for classification: 1) Points; 2) Points difference; 3) Number of points scored;
(C) Champions; (L) League Leaders' Shield Winners

== Play-offs ==
The play-offs commence following the conclusion of 27 round regular season. To decide the grand finalists from the top eight finishing teams, Super League adopts the unique Super League play-off system. The finals will conclude with the 2010 Super League Grand Final.

Qualifying/Elimination playoffs
2	St. Helens	28
3	Warrington Wolves	12
5	Huddersfield Giants	18
8	Crusaders	12
6	Hull	4
7	Hull KR	21
1	Wigan Warriors	26
4	Leeds Rhinos	27

Preliminary semifinals
Warrington Wolves	22
Huddersfield Giants	34
Hull KR	18
Wigan Warriors	42

Qualifying semifinals
St Helens selected Huddersfield
St Helens	42
Huddersfield Giants	22
Leeds Rhinos	6
Wigan Warriors	26

Grand Final
2 October, Old Trafford
St Helens	10
Wigan Warriors	22

Week 1. Qualifying/Elimination play-offs: Fixtures decided by regular reason finishing positions. Higher ranked teams play lower ranked teams. Higher ranked teams receive home ground advantage.
Week 2. Preliminary semi-finals: Fixtures decided by regular season finishing positions. Higher ranked teams play lower ranked teams. Higher ranked teams receive home ground advantage.
Week 3. Qualifying semi-finals: Winners of Qualifying play-offs play winners of Qualifying semi-finals. Fixtures decided by club call. Winners of Qualifying play-offs receive home ground advantage.

Home	Score	Away	Match Information
Home	Score	Away	Date and Time (Local)	Venue	Referee	Crowd
QUALIFYING AND ELIMINATION FINALS
St Helens R.F.C.	28 – 12	Warrington Wolves	10 September, 8:00pm	GPW Recruitment Stadium	Richard Silverwood (Dewsbury)	14,632
Huddersfield Giants	18 – 12	Crusaders	11 September, 3:45pm	Galpharm Stadium	Ben Thaler(Wakefield)	5,869
Hull	4 – 21	Hull Kingston Rovers	11 September, 6:00pm	KC Stadium	Phil Bentham (Warrington)	17,699
Wigan Warriors	26 – 27	Leeds Rhinos	12 September, 6:45pm	DW Stadium	Thierry Alibert (Toulouse)	14,987
PRELIMINARY SEMI-FINALS
Wigan Warriors	42 – 18	Hull Kingston Rovers	17 September, 8:00pm	DW Stadium	R Silverwood	11,133
Warrington Wolves	22 – 34	Huddersfield Giants	18 September, 6:15pm	Halliwell Jones Stadium	P Bentham	8,050
SEMI-FINALS
St Helens R.F.C.	42 – 22	Huddersfield Giants	24 September, 8:00pm	GPW Recruitment Stadium	P Bentham	13,510
Leeds Rhinos	6 – 26	Wigan Warriors	25 September, 5:15pm	Headingley Stadium	R Silverwood	13,693
GRAND FINAL
St Helens R.F.C.	10 – 22	Wigan Warriors	2 October, 6:00pm	Old Trafford, Manchester	R Silverwood	71,526

== Awards ==
Awards have been presented for outstanding contributions and efforts to players and clubs:

- Man of Steel: Pat Richards (Wigan Warriors)
- Young Player of the Year: Sam Tomkins (Wigan Warriors)
- Coach of the Year: Michael Maguire (Wigan Warriors)
- Top Tackler: Dallas Johnson (Catalans Dragons)
- Top Points Scorer: Pat Richards (Wigan Warriors)
- Most Meters: James Graham (St. Helens)
- Team of the Season: Wigan Warriors
- Albert Goldthorpe Medal: Pat Richards and Sam Tomkins (both Wigan Warriors)
- Rugby League Writers Player of the Year: Pat Richards (Wigan Warriors)

== Disciplinary record ==
The following table lists all incidents that were reviewed by the Rugby Football League during Super League XV, which were later deemed "guilty" and resulted in disciplinary action. The offenses were graded, depending on severity, in alphabetical order, "A" being less severe than "B".

== Media ==
=== Television ===
2010 was the second of a three-year broadcasting agreement between the RFL and BSkyB for Sky Sports to screen matches exclusively live within the United Kingdom. The deal for the 2009, 2010 and 2011 season was worth in excess of £50 million.

Sky Sports' continued coverage in the UK sees two live matches broadcast each week - one on Friday at 7:30pm and another at 6pm on Saturday. Regular commentators are Eddie Hemmings and Mike Stephenson with summarisers including Phil Clarke, Barrie McDermott and Terry O'Connor. Highlights are shown on Boots N' All which is shown on Sky Sports and is rebroadcast on the Internet.

BBC Sport broadcast a highlights programme called the Super League Show, usually presented by Harry Gration. The BBC have elected to broadcast this only to the North West, Yorkshire and North Midlands, North East and Cumbria, and East Yorkshire and Lincolnshire regions on a Sunday. A national repeat is broadcast overnight during the week, the BBC Director of Sport, Richard Moseley, commented that this move was in response to the growing popularity and awareness of the sport, and the large number of requests from people who want to watch it elsewhere in the UK. End of season play-offs are shown across the whole country in a highlights package. Super League Show is available for streaming or downloaded using the BBC iPlayer in the UK.

Orange Sport TV in France shows every Catalans Dragons home match live and also some other matches which are broadcast in the UK live on Sky.

Internationally Super League is shown live on Showtime Sports (Middle East), Sky Sport (New Zealand), NTV+ (Russia), SportKlub (Eastern Europe).

2010 was the second year of a three-year deal in which the Nine Network in Australia show up to 70 live games from Super League over the season.

In the United States America One show live Super League games from 2010.

Channel Nine started coverage of 2010 matches from 7 March at midnight (leading into Monday morning) due to coverage of the Winter Olympics they could not show the earlier matches.

=== Radio ===
Super League XV is covered extensively by BBC Local Radio:

- BBC Radio Manchester cover Wigan, Salford and Warrington
- BBC Radio Humberside cover Hull KR and Hull
- BBC Radio Leeds cover Bradford, Leeds, Castleford, Wakefield and Huddersfield
- BBC Radio Merseyside (AM/DAB only) cover St Helens and Warrington

The competition is also covered on commercial radio coverage:

- BCB 106.6 (Bradford Community Broadcasting) cover Bradford Bulls home and away
- Radio Aire cover Leeds Rhinos
- KCFM Hull cover Hull KR and Hull
- Radio Marseillette covers every Catalans Dragons Home Match (in French)
- Radio France Bleu Roussillon covers every Catalans Dragons Away Match (in French)
- Yorkshire Radio cover all Yorkshire clubs and have one commentary per round which is not covered by either BBC or Sky

All Super League commentaries on any station are available via the particular stations on-line streaming.

=== Internet ===
ESPN3 has worldwide broadband rights.

Starting from 9 April 2009, all of the matches shown on Sky Sports are also available live online via Livestation everywhere in the world excluding the US, Puerto Rico, UK, Ireland, France, Monaco, Australia and New Zealand.

In the United Kingdom, BBC London 94.9, BBC Radio Wales and Radio Warrington cover Harlequins, Crusaders (home games) and Warrington (home games) respectively.
