= Thomas Leuluai =

New Zealand international rugby league footballer

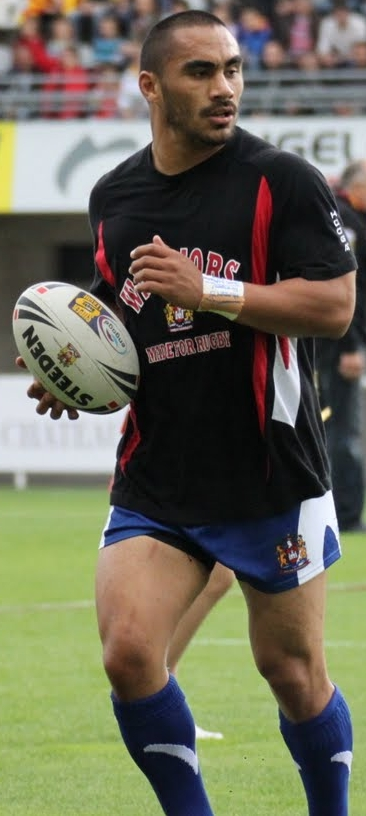

Personal information
- Full name: Thomas James Leuluai
- Born: 22 June 1985 (age 41) Auckland, New Zealand

Playing information
- Height: 5 ft 9 in (1.76 m)
- Weight: 13 st 8 lb (86 kg)
- Position: Scrum-half, Hooker, Stand-off
Club
Years	Team	Pld	T	G	FG	P
2003–04	New Zealand Warriors	21	2	0	0	8
2005–06	London Broncos	40	21	0	0	84
2007–12	Wigan Warriors	189	60	0	0	240
2013–16	New Zealand Warriors	64	10	0	0	40
2017–22	Wigan Warriors	134	14	0	1	57
	Total	448	107	0	1	429
Representative
Years	Team	Pld	T	G	FG	P
2003–17	New Zealand	40	3	0	0	12
2011–12	Exiles	2	0	0	0	0
- Father: James Leuluai
- Relatives: Phillip Leuluai (uncle); Macgraff Leuluai (brother); Kylie Leuluai (cousin); Marley Leuluai (cousin)

Thomas James Leuluai (born 22 June 1985) is a New Zealand professional rugby league coach who is an assistant coach at the Wigan Warriors in the Super League and a former professional rugby league footballer who played for New Zealand at international level.

He played for the New Zealand Warriors in the NRL in two separate spells in Auckland, the London Broncos in the Super League, before moving to Wigan for the first of his two spells at the club. Leuluai was a member of the 2008 World Cup-winning New Zealand team and has also played for the Exiles.

== Background ==
Leuluai was born in Auckland, New Zealand, and is of Samoan and Māori descent.

Leuluai's father is former Maori representative/New Zealand international James Leuluai, who scored two tries for Hull F.C. in the 1985 Challenge Cup Final 6 weeks before Thomas was born. Thomas was educated at Mount Albert Grammar School where he attended school with fellow rugby league players Sonny Bill Williams, Steve Matai and Tevita Latu. Leuluai's brother Macgraff Leuluai currently plays for Widnes Vikings, his uncle Phillip Leuluai played for Salford City Reds and his cousin Kylie Leuluai played for the Leeds Rhinos.

== Playing career ==
=== New Zealand Warriors ===
Leuluai started his professional career at National Rugby League side New Zealand Warriors in 2003. He also played for the Junior Kiwis. At the time of his début he was the youngest player to play for the club, coincidentally in the same game Mark Robinson became the oldest player to make his début for the club. With competition from New Zealand internationals Stacey Jones and Lance Hohaia he had limited first team experience at New Zealand Warriors and consequently he spent most of the 2003 season in the Bartercard Cup playing for his youth club Otahuhu-Ellerslie, playing 10 games and scoring 5 tries. Leuluai became the second youngest player ever to represent the Kiwis when he made his début that year.

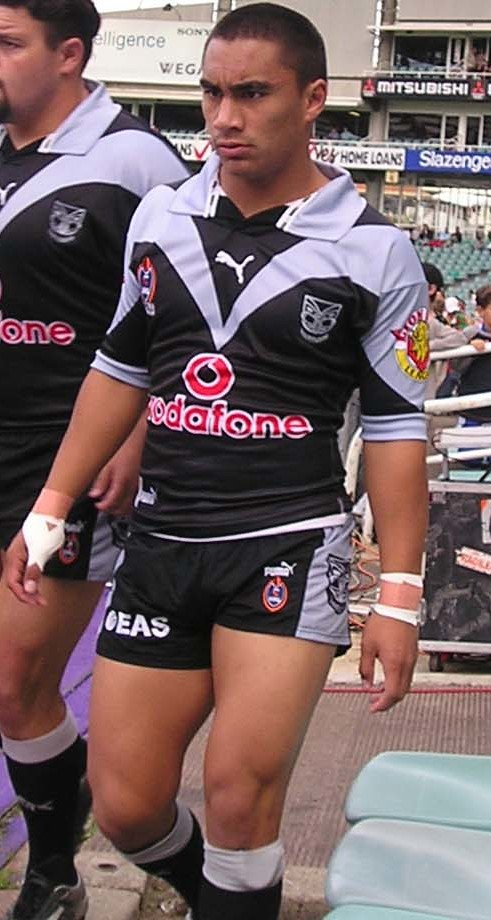
Leuluai playing for the Warriors at the SFS

At the end of 2004, he left the Warriors after playing 21 first grade games and scoring two tries.

=== London Broncos ===
In 2004, Leuluai signed a contract with Super League side London Broncos as a replacement for Dennis Moran who had left the Broncos to join the Wigan Warriors. He spent two years at the club playing 38 games and scoring 19 tries. Both seasons were affected by injury. In 2005, his season was cut short by a broken ankle while his 2006 campaign was disrupted by a hamstring injury sustained while playing for New Zealand. His contract was not extended and he agreed to join the Wigan Warriors for the 2007 season.

=== Wigan Warriors ===
Leuluai agreed a three-year deal with Wigan Warriors in December 2006 after months of speculation and rumours. He would replace Australians Michael Dobson and partner Trent Barrett in the halves during the 2007 season. Leuluai made his Wigan Super League début in a 16–10 defeat by the Warrington Wolves at the JJB Stadium on 9 February 2007. He scored the game-winning try against St. Helens at the JJB stadium and scored Wigan's first against the Bradford Bulls in the history breaking 31–30 comeback win in the Play-offs.

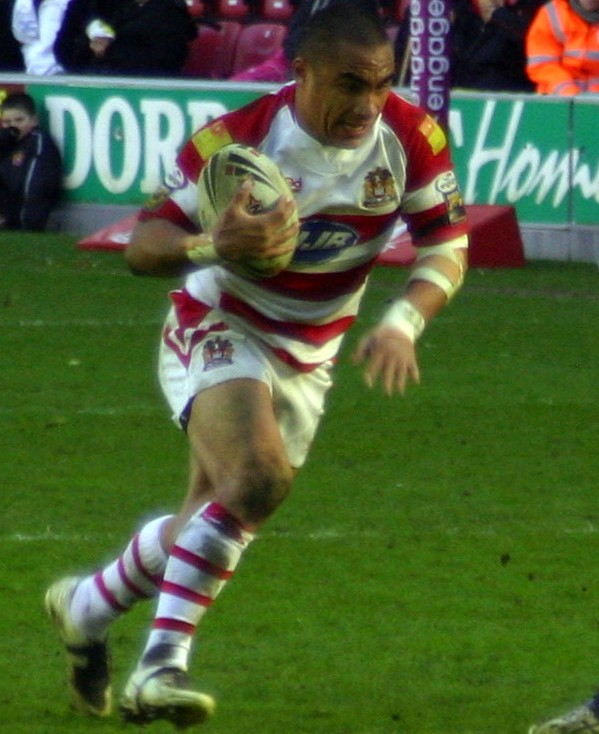
Leuluai playing for the Wigan Warriors in 2008

On 9 May 2008 Leuluai played for New Zealand against Australia at the Sydney Cricket Ground in the Centenary Test, which took place 100 years to the day after the New Zealand 'All Golds' first met Australia.

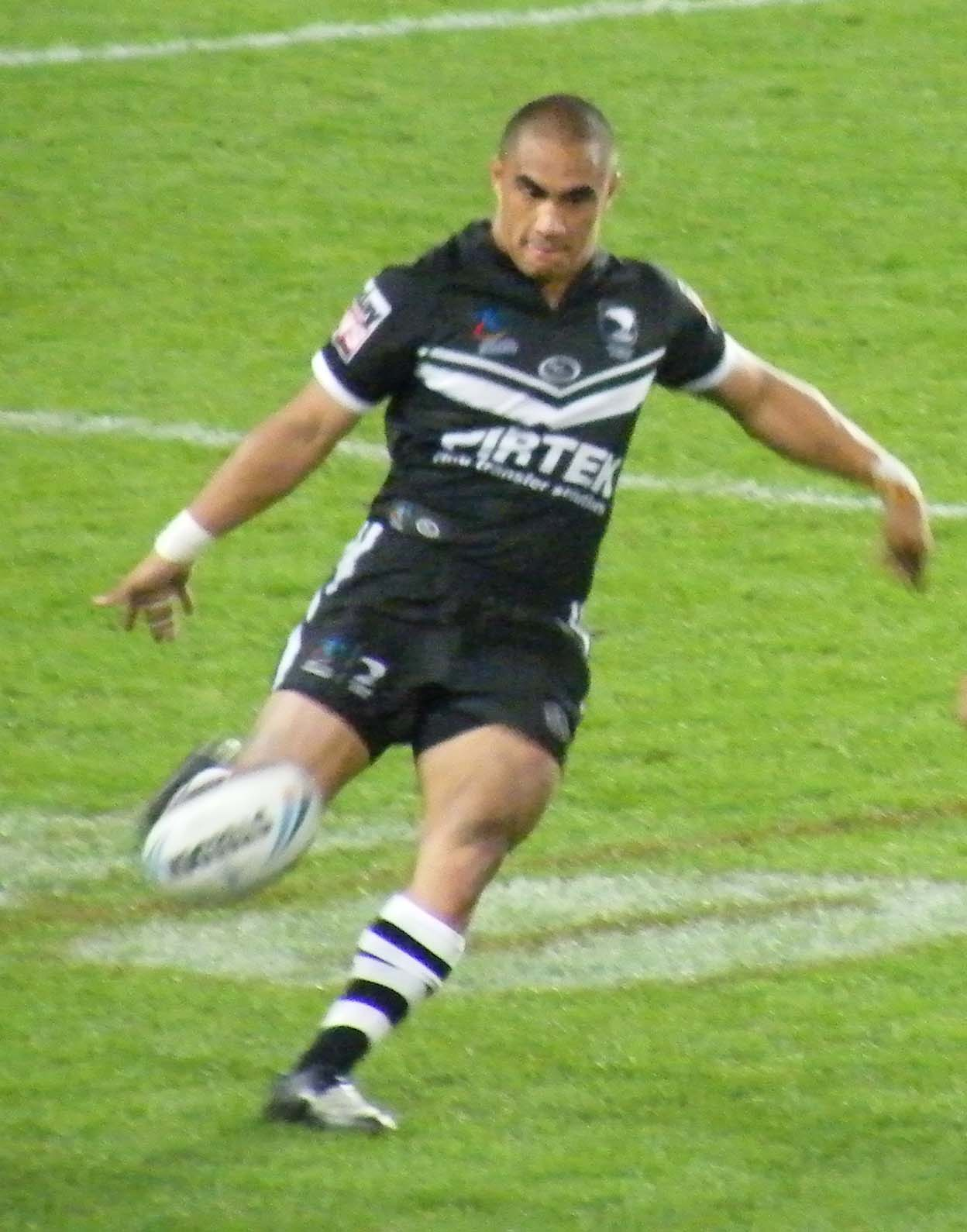
Tommy Leuluai playing for the Kiwis at the 2008 Rugby League World Cup.

At the end of 2008 Leuluai played for the New Zealand team which won the 2008 World Cup.

In April 2009, having made over seventy appearances for the club, Leuluai extended his contract with the Wigan Warriors by three years to last him until the 2012 season.

He helped Wigan to their first Championship since 1998 with a man-of-the-match performance in the 2010 Super League Grand Final earning him the Harry Sunderland Trophy in the victory over St. Helens at Old Trafford.

The 2011 Wigan Warriors season started against St Helens R.F.C. in the opening fixture of the season, with his first try coming a week later at Bradford Bulls in Round 2. As well as playing in the 2011 World Club Challenge, Leuluai scored a brace in Round 4 against Salford City Reds. A try against Hull Kingston Rovers was followed with another against Crusaders RL in Rounds 10 and 13 respectively. He then claimed two more braces in consecutive matches, firstly against Barrow Raiders in the Challenge Cup fourth round, then against Harlequins in Round 14 of 2011's Super League XVI.

Leuluai was selected for the Exiles squad for the International Origin match against England at Headingley on 10 June 2011.

Leuluai played as a hooker in the 2011 Challenge Cup Final victory over the Leeds Rhinos, scoring a try at Wembley Stadium.

=== Return to New Zealand ===
In November 2011 Leuluai announced that he had signed a three-year contract with the New Zealand Warriors starting in 2013.

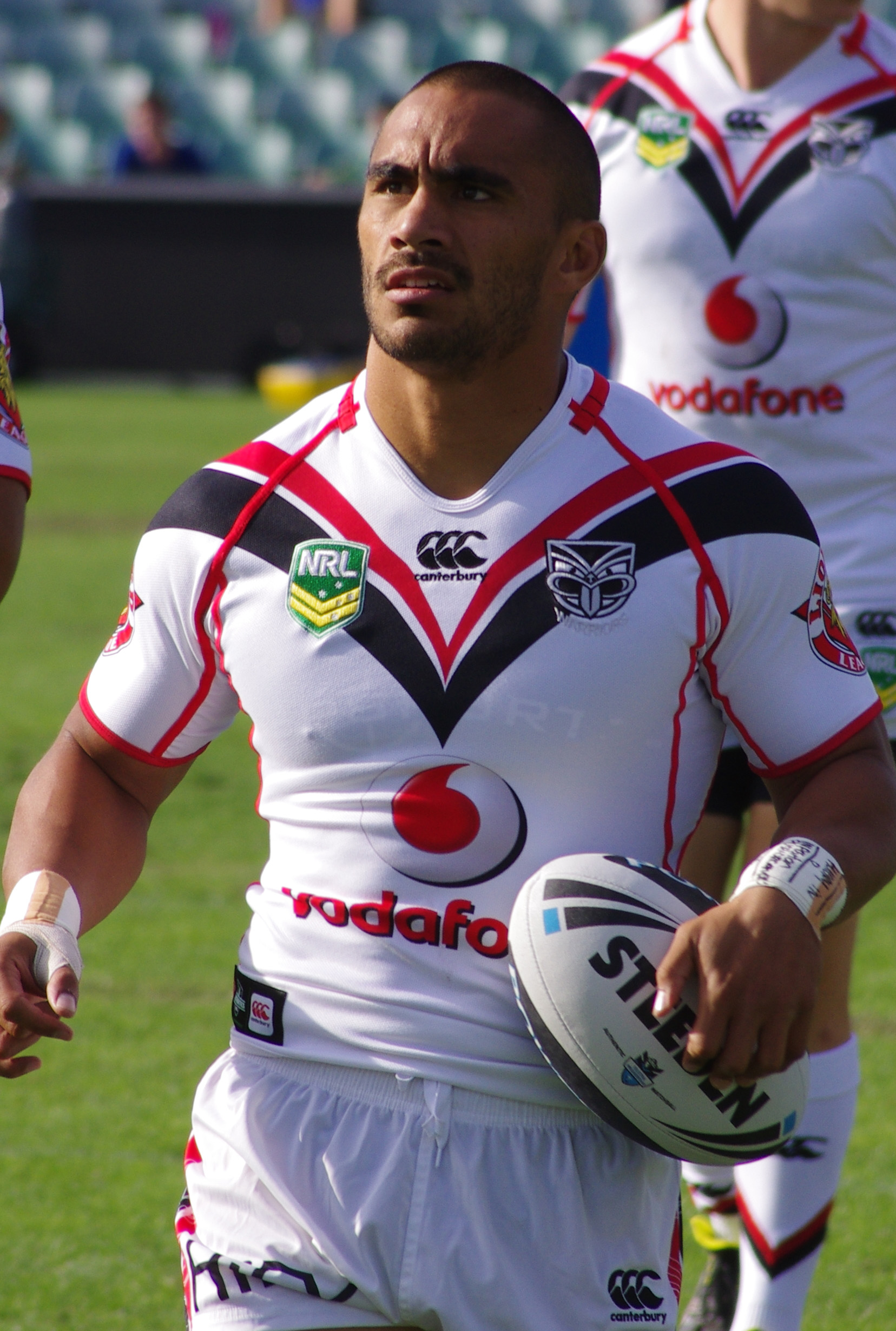
Leuluai playing for Warriors in 2013

In 2016 he was linked with a move back to Super League with St Helens, However, in July 2016, Leuluai announced he would be re-joining the Wigan Warriors in 2017.

=== Wigan comeback ===
Having been awarded the number 7 jersey on his return to Wigan he made his second début against Salford Red Devils in Round 1 of the 2017 Super League season. A week later he helped Wigan to lift the World Club Challenge against the Cronulla-Sutherland Sharks scoring his first try of the season a week later against Widnes Vikings. Leuluai suffered a broken jaw in Round 11 of the Super League just six months after suffering the same injury playing for New Zealand. He made his comeback just four weeks later against St Helens, scoring his second try of the season against Wakefield Trinity.

He played in the 2017 Challenge Cup Final defeat by Hull F.C. at Wembley Stadium. He scored his third and final try of the season against Castleford Tigers in the sixth round of the Super 8's. His good form saw his called up to the New Zealand World Cup squad playing twice for the Kiwis. After telling coach Shaun Wane he felt more comfortable in the hooker role he was handed the number 9 shirt after the departure of Michael McIlorum. He played in the 2018 Super League Grand Final victory over the Warrington Wolves at Old Trafford. He played in the 2020 Super League Grand Final which Wigan lost 8-4 against St Helens. On 28 May, Leuluai played for Wigan in their 2022 Challenge Cup Final win over Huddersfield.

=== Retirement and Wigan assistant coach ===
On 1 September 2022, it was announced that Leuluai would be retiring at the end of the 2022 season, to replace Lee Briers as the assistant manager. Leuluai also announced that he will lead out New Zealand in a World Cup warm up match, against Leeds Rhinos on 8 October 2022, before joining the coaching staff at New Zealand.

In 2023, Leuluai came out of retirement to play for Wigan RU with fellow assistant coach Sean O'Loughlin, scoring on his debut.

== Career statistics ==
Season	Team	Apps	Tries	Goals	DG	Points
2003	New Zealand Warriors	12	1	0	0	4
2004	New Zealand Warriors	9	1	0	0	4
2005	London Broncos	22	14	0	0	56
2006	London Broncos	18	7	0	0	28
2007	Wigan Warriors	34	11	0	0	44
2008	Wigan Warriors	32	12	0	0	48
2009	Wigan Warriors	34	10	0	0	40
2010	Wigan Warriors	31	8	0	0	32
2011	Wigan Warriors	35	11	0	0	44
2012	Wigan Warriors	23	8	0	0	32
2013	New Zealand Warriors	24	6	0	0	24
2014	New Zealand Warriors	12	0	0	0	0
2015	New Zealand Warriors	10	1	0	0	4
2016	New Zealand Warriors	18	3	0	0	12
2017	Wigan Warriors	31	3	0	1	13
2018	Wigan Warriors	31	4	0	0	16
2019	Wigan Warriors	32	5			24
2020	Wigan Warriors	19	1			4
2021	Wigan Warriors	13	1			4
2022	Wigan Warriors	12				
Total		448	107	0	1	429

== Honours ==
Wigan

- Super League: 2010, 2018
- League Leaders' Shield: 2010, 2012, 2020
- Challenge Cup: 2011, 2022
- World Club Challenge: 2017

New Zealand

- Rugby League World Cup: 2008
- Rugby League Four Nations: 2010

Individual

- Harry Sunderland Trophy: 2010
