= Liam Campbell (rugby league) =

English rugby league footballer

Personal information
- Full name: Liam Campbell
- Born: 5 June 1986 (age 39)

Playing information
- Position: Scrum-half
Club
Years	Team	Pld	T	G	FG	P
2005	Wakefield Trinity Wildcats	1	0	0	0	0
2006	Barrow Raiders
2007	Workington Town
2008	Barrow Raiders
	Total	1	0	0	0	0

Liam Campbell is a former professional rugby league footballer who played in the 2000s. He played at club level for Wakefield Trinity, Barrow (two spells), and Workington Town, as a scrum-half.
