= 40–20 rule =

NBA rule on championships

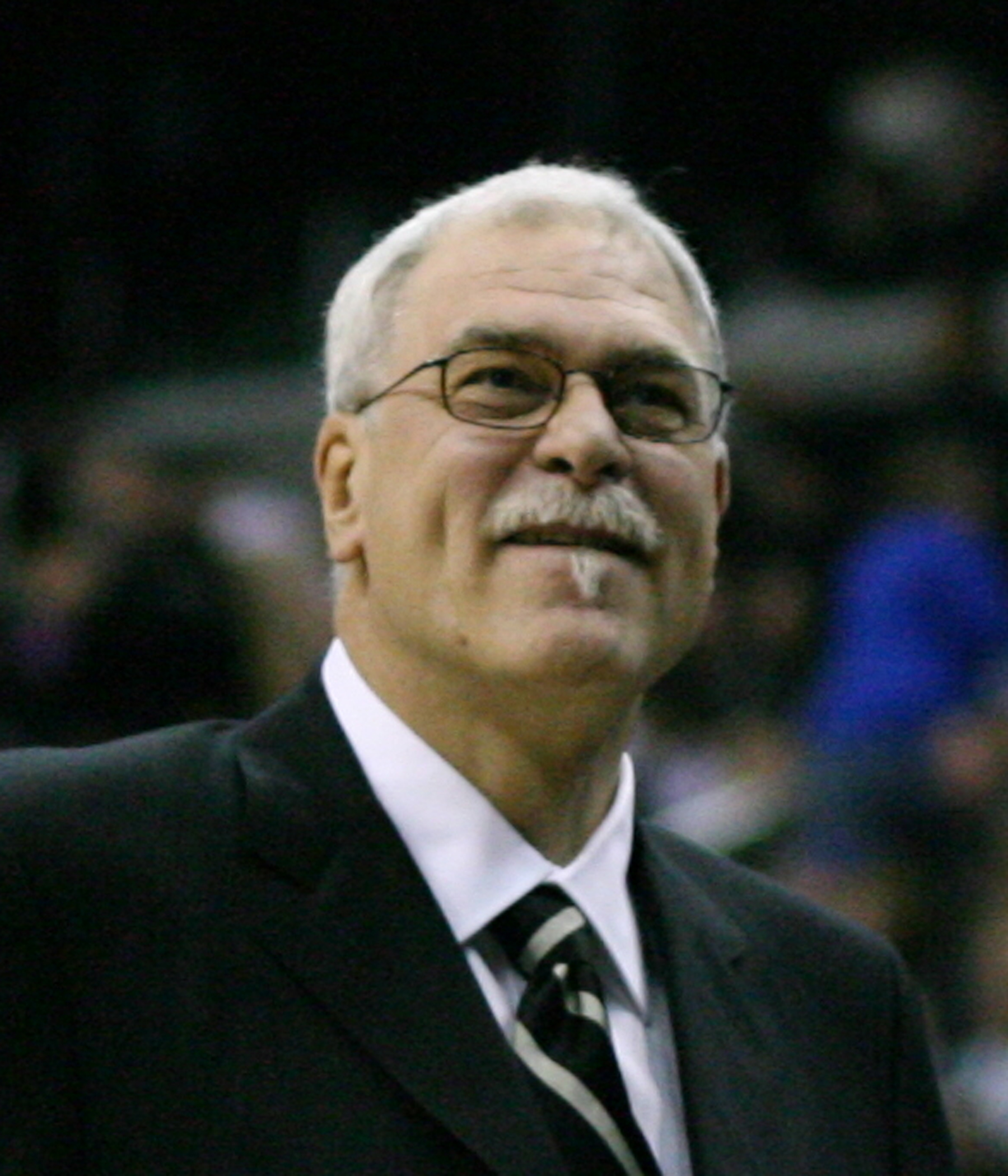
Phil Jackson

The 40–20 rule posits that a team in the National Basketball Association (NBA) must win 40 games before losing 20 to have a chance at winning that year's championship. It was first publicized by 11-time NBA champion head coach Phil Jackson. Since the NBA added the three-point line in the 1979–80 season, all champions won 40 games before losing 20, except for five teams: the 1994–95 Houston Rockets, 2003–04 Detroit Pistons, 2005–06 Miami Heat, 2020–21 Milwaukee Bucks and the 2025–26 New York Knicks. The rule highlights how a team must be dominant over the first 60 games of the season to win a championship.

== 40-20 rule by season ==
Updated through 2024 season
Includes seasons since addition of 3-point line in 1979-80 season

^	Won championship despite failing to win 40 games before losing 20 times
†	Shortened season (not full 82 game schedule)

Season	Champion	Record at 40th win
1980	Los Angeles Lakers	40-17
1981	Boston Celtics	40-9
1982	Los Angeles Lakers	40-17
1983	Philadelphia 76ers	40-6
1984	Boston Celtics	40-12
1985	Los Angeles Lakers	40-16
1986	Boston Celtics	40-9
1987	Los Angeles Lakers	40-13
1988	Los Angeles Lakers	40-9
1989	Detroit Pistons	40-16
1990	Detroit Pistons	40-15
1991	Chicago Bulls	40-14
1992	Chicago Bulls	40-9
1993	Chicago Bulls	40-17
1994	Houston Rockets	40-15
1995	Houston Rockets ^	40-25
1996	Chicago Bulls	40-3
1997	Chicago Bulls	40-5
1998	Chicago Bulls	40-15
1999 †	San Antonio Spurs	37-13
2000	Los Angeles Lakers	40-11
2001	Los Angeles Lakers	40-19
2002	Los Angeles Lakers	40-17
2003	San Antonio Spurs	40-17
2004	Detroit Pistons ^	40-25
2005	San Antonio Spurs	40-11
2006	Miami Heat ^	40-20
2007	San Antonio Spurs	40-18
2008	Boston Celtics	40-9
2009	Los Angeles Lakers	40-9
2010	Los Angeles Lakers	40-13
2011	Dallas Mavericks	40-16
2012 †	Miami Heat	40-15
2013	Miami Heat	40-14
2014	San Antonio Spurs	40-15
2015	Golden State Warriors	40-9
2016	Cleveland Cavaliers	40-14
2017	Golden State Warriors	40-7
2018	Golden State Warriors	40-10
2019	Toronto Raptors	40-16
2020 †	Los Angeles Lakers	40-12
2021 †	Milwaukee Bucks ^	40-24
2022	Golden State Warriors	40-13
2023	Denver Nuggets	40-18
2024	Boston Celtics	40-12
2025	Oklahoma City Thunder	40-9
2026	New York Knicks ^	40-22

== Recent developments ==
Since 2020, the 2019–20 Miami Heat, 2020–21 Milwaukee Bucks, 2021–2022 Boston Celtics, 2022–23 Heat, 2023–24 Dallas Mavericks, 2024–25 Indiana Pacers and 2025–26 New York Knicks have all made the Finals, despite not qualifying for the 40–20 rule. Although only the Bucks and Knicks ended their campaign victorious, it is worth noting that, with load management, players are playing fewer games than ever before, making the rule potentially more difficult to achieve in the future.
