= Pat Richards =

Ireland international rugby league footballer

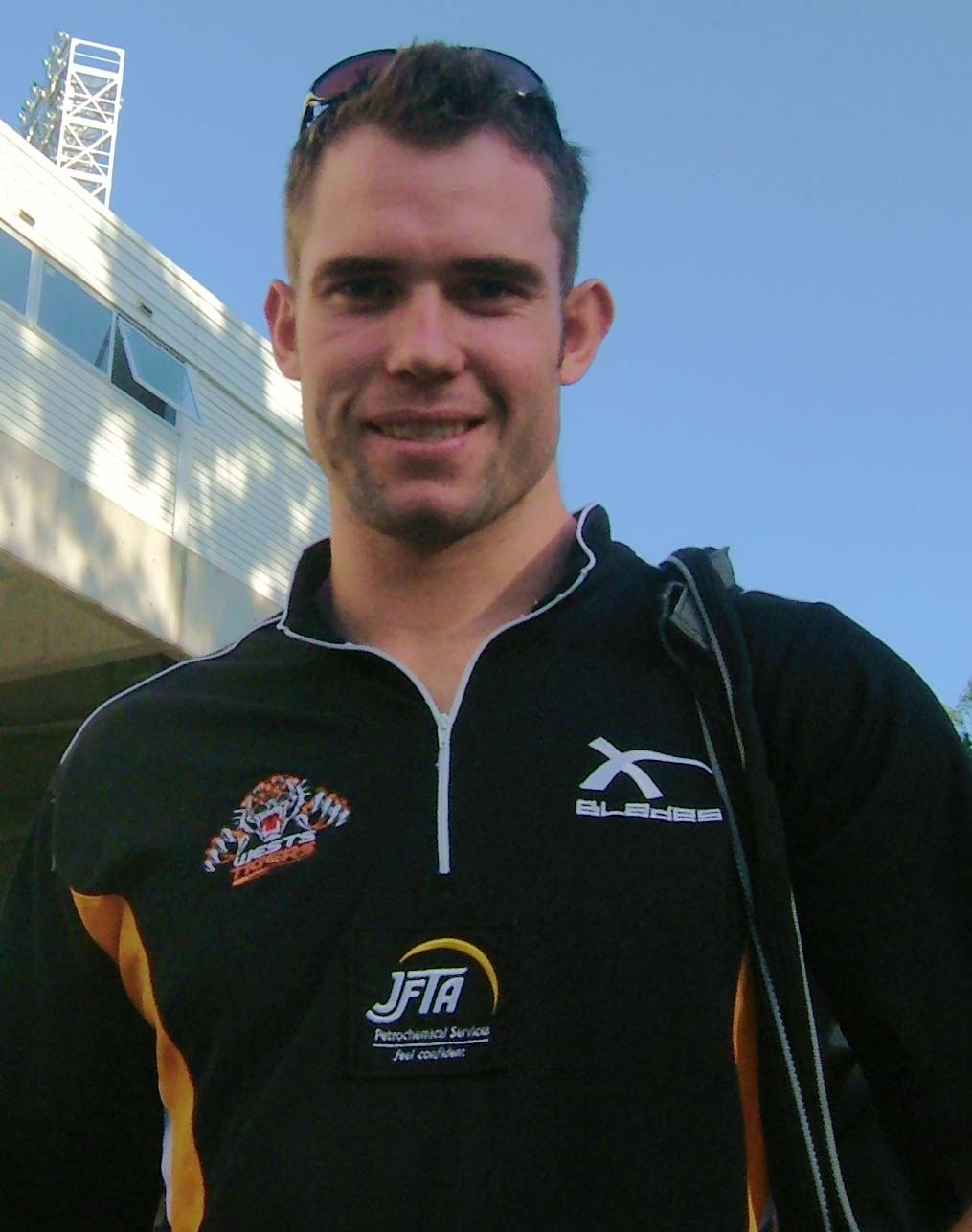

Personal information
- Full name: Patrick Richards
- Born: 27 February 1982 (age 44) Liverpool, New South Wales, Australia

Playing information
- Height: 192 cm (6 ft 4 in)
- Weight: 99 kg (15 st 8 lb)
- Position: Wing, Fullback, Centre
Club
Years	Team	Pld	T	G	FG	P
2000–03	Parramatta Eels	37	14	4	0	64
2004–05	Wests Tigers	39	26	0	0	104
2006–13	Wigan Warriors	244	167	898	4	2468
2014–15	Wests Tigers	43	26	118	2	342
2016	Catalans Dragons	21	9	76	0	188
	Total	384	242	1096	6	3166
Representative
Years	Team	Pld	T	G	FG	P
2008–13	Ireland	7	3	11	0	34
2011–13	Exiles	2	0	3	0	6

Pat Richards (born 27 February 1982) is a former professional rugby league footballer. An Ireland international winger, he played in the National Rugby League for Sydney clubs the Parramatta Eels and the Wests Tigers, with whom he won the 2005 NRL Premiership, and the Wigan Warriors and the Catalans Dragons in the Super League, winning the 2010 and 2013 Super League Grand Finals with the former. While in Super League, Richards won the Man of Steel award in 2010 and is the highest overseas points-scorer in the competition's history. He is a cousin of UFC superstar Conor McGregor.

== Early life ==
Born in Liverpool, New South Wales, Australia to Irish parents. Richards attended St Therese Primary School and Westfields Sports High School. He played junior rugby league for the Cabramatta club. Richards was an accomplished cricketer before deciding to take up rugby league on a full time basis.

== Club career ==
=== Parramatta Eels (2000–2003) ===
Richards played for Parramatta Eels between 2000 and 2003. In 2001 he was unable to play in the grand final due to a broken leg. After the 2003 season Richards moved to Wests Tigers after being told by Parramatta coach Brian Smith that he was unwanted for the next season and that he should focus on his cricketing career and forget Rugby League altogether.

=== Wests Tigers (2004–2005) ===
Richards enjoyed a successful 2005 season with the Tigers. He scored a club record 20 tries during the season, since surpassed by Taniela Tuiaki. Richards' drop kicks/outs and towering kick-offs were instrumental in gaining valuable field position for the team during their premiership year.

Despite suffering an ankle ligament injury the week prior, Richards was cleared to play in the 2005 NRL Grand Final against North Queensland Cowboys. Richards' try from a Benji Marshall flick pass was a highlight of the Wests Tigers' win. Richards later said of the painkillers required to play, "The doctor pretty much injected all over the ankle. It probably would have been about five or six and a couple in the knee. As I was running I couldn't feel anything. It was like running on memory because I couldn't feel my foot hit the ground."

In the moments after the premiership victory, Channel 9 sideline commentator Matthew Johns interviewed Richards live on national television and asked him to describe the feeling of winning a premiership. Richards replied "Mate there was no way in the world I was going to miss this game, and I f***ing, oh sorry, it's the best feeling ever". In the coming days, the Wests Tigers club were forced to make an apology for the inappropriate language used by some of their players.

=== Wigan (2006–2013) ===
==== 2006-2009 ====
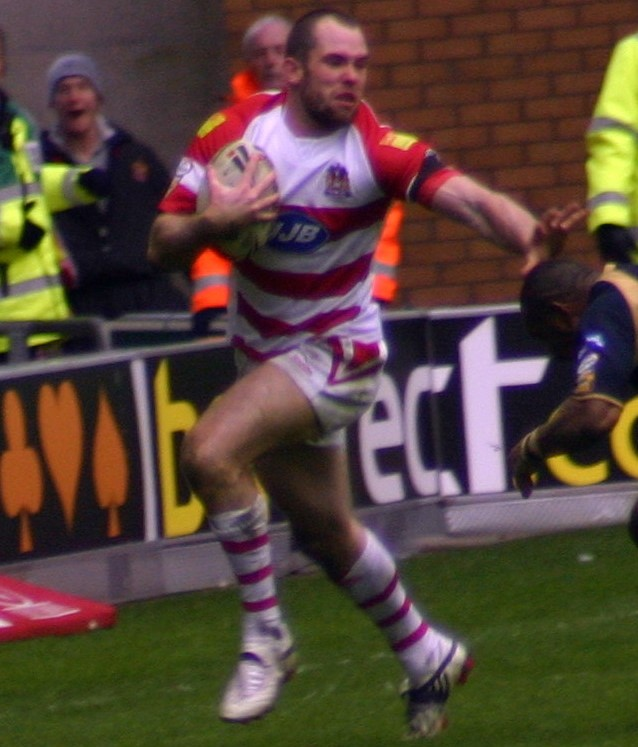
Richards playing for Wigan in 2008

Richards signed a two-year contract with Wigan for the 2006 and 2007 seasons in June 2005. Speaking from Sydney on the day of his signing for Wigan, Pat Richards said, "I had three enquiries from leading Super League clubs but I feel sure that Wigan is the club for me. They are strengthening well for next year and Ian Millward is a very successful coach. I am looking forward to joining the club." Head Coach Ian Millward also commented, "Pat is the ideal player for the modern game. He is over 6 feet tall, fields high balls very well and has a special and powerful kicking game. In keeping with the modern game he gives us cover for several positions. He also has an Irish background and he may bring a bit of the Irish luck with him." Because of his Irish EU passport he did not count in Wigan's overseas quota.

He started his Wigan career playing in the centre rather than his usually position of wing. He scored 12 tries and kicked 12 goals in 25 appearances during the 2006 season but there was some criticism of Wigan coach Ian Millward for playing him out of position as it was clear that Richards was not suited to playing at centre. After Ian Millward was sacked, incoming coach Brian Noble immediately moved him to the wing, where he scored a brace of tries in a thrashing of Huddersfield Giants. Richards never played centre again . At the start of 2007 he was given the squad number 5 and was also promoted to first goal kicker after the other goal kickers, Michael Dobson, Danny Orr and Wayne Godwin left Wigan at the end of 2006. Despite not previously being a regular goal kicker, Pat quickly developed the skills. After 27 appearances in 2007 he scored 14 tries, kicked 103 goals and was Man-of-the-Match 4 times. Mid-way through the season, Richards was moved to full back after Michael Withers' retirement.

On 21 September 2007 he kicked the vital drop goal to give Wigan a 31–30 win over Bradford Bulls. It completed the biggest comeback in Super League history at that point (and still stands as the biggest comeback in playoff history).

In 2008, Richards was the Wigan Player of the Season scoring 19 tries and getting a total of 375 points in one season meaning he was the top points scorer in Super League that year as he was the previous year. He also signed a new 3-year deal with Wigan mid-2008 stating he and his family were settled at the club and loved the town.

Richards made himself available for Ireland's 2008 Rugby League World Cup campaign.

In August 2008, Richards was named in the Ireland training squad for the 2008 Rugby League World Cup, and in October 2008 he was named in the final 24-man Ireland squad. He featured prominently in the tournament; in Ireland's win over Samoa on 5 November, Richards scored 22 of the team's 34 points, including three tries.

Richards continued to be a stand out performer for Wigan in 2009 and was again selected to play for Ireland in the 2009 European Cup.

==== 2010-2013 ====
Richards' try-scoring exploits and accuracy with the boot proved vital for Wigan's push for honours in 2010. He often had to occupy the full back position in the absence of the injured Cameron Phelps and Amos Roberts before Sam Tomkins' move to full back allowed Richards to reclaim his favoured wing position.

Pat Richards was the first Australian player to score 1,000 points or more for the Wigan club. On 27 February 2010 Richards scored 5 tries and kicked 9 goals against Catalans Dragons in a 58–0 victory for Wigan. His 38 points was the most in one match for a Wigan player in the Super League era.

On 3 September 2010, in a game against Bradford Bulls Richards equalled the record for the most points in a regular Super League season. Scoring 14 on the night he matched Andrew Farrell's impressive 388 points. Later in September it was announced that Richards was one of three players nominated for the prestigious Man-of-Steel award.

Pat won the Man-of-Steel award on Monday, 27 September 2010, beating Adrian Morley, and teammate Sam Tomkins to the accolade. He was also the joint Albert Goldthorpe Medal winner with teammate Sam Tomkins as the Super League player of the 2010 season. The total of 462 points that Richards scored over the entire 2010 season (including playoffs and/or Challenge Cup) set a new club record at Wigan.

He played in the 2010 Super League Grand Final victory over St. Helens at Old Trafford.

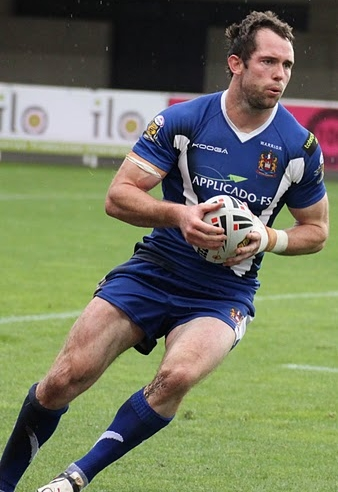
Richards playing for the Wigan Warriors

Richards' 2011 season was delayed after the Achilles tendon injury picked up during the 2010 Grand Final kept him out for five to six months. His first appearance in 2011's Super League came in Round 9 against Catalans Dragons, where he took over the kicking duties and landed four goals. Three tries over the Easter period, including a brace against St Helens gave him his first tries of the campaign, and this was followed up at Crusaders RL with another touchdown, as well as seven goals.

Pat Richards was selected for the Exiles squad for the inaugural International Origin Match against England at Headingley on 10 June 2011.

Richards played on the wing in the 2011 Challenge Cup Final victory over the Leeds Rhinos at Wembley Stadium, kicking 4 goals from 5 attempts in his side's win.

On 26 April 2013 he signed for Wests Tigers in the NRL, on a two-year deal from 2014. He was 32 by the time the season started. Richards said, ""I loved my time over there (with Wigan) but it got to a stage where if I didn't come back I probably never would come back.".

He played in the 2013 Challenge Cup Final victory over Hull F.C. at Wembley Stadium.

He played in the 2013 Super League Grand Final victory over the Warrington Wolves at Old Trafford.

Richards ended his time at Wigan as their third all-time points scorer (2468), third all time goal scorer (898), top Super League try scorer (146), second top Super League point (2104) and goal (758) scorer behind Andy Farrell, as well as two Grand Final wins, two Challenge Cup wins, and a League Leaders Shield to his name as well as the aforementioned Man of Steel win in 2010.

=== Return to Wests Tigers (2014–2015) ===
Scoring a try with his first touch of the ball, Richards contributed 12 points in his return to the Wests Tigers. In his second game, he scored two tries and kicked seven goals, and kicked a 72-metre drop-out that some thought might be a "world record". Early in the season, Richards was the competition's leading point-scorer, and was considered a possibility for State of Origin by New South Wales coach Laurie Daley. He finished the year as the club's leading try-scorer and point-scorer.

In round 5 of the 2015 season, Richards scored a try and set up two others in his 100th NRL game. Fox sports said, "The try Richards set up for fullback James Tedesco was extraordinary. He flew down the sideline, tiptoeing to stay in the field of play by just millimetres. When finally collared by the defence, Richards managed a rushed chip-kick off-balance – and with his non-preferred left foot – which Tedesco caught to score a bizarre try." He was the first NRL winger to set up two tries with kicks since Hazem El Masri achieved the same feat in 2005.

In the round 8 match against the Bulldogs, Richards kicked a penalty goal from close to the sideline and 54 metres from the tryline. Richards said, "I'm pretty sure that's the first one over 50. I've done one or two from 50 out before. I always knew I had the legs to get it over. It was just a matter of accuracy." In the first eight rounds of 2015, Richards scored 8 tries, 22 goals and 1 field-goal, to be the competition's leading point-scorer and equal third-highest try-scorer.

In Round 22 of the 2015 NRL season, Richards became the first Australian player in the modern era to kick 1000 goals. He finished the regular season as the competition's third highest scorer of points and tries, and fourth best in line breaks.

=== Catalans Dragons (2016) ===
Richards joined Catalans Dragons for the 2016 Super League season, appearing 21 times and scoring 188 points for the club before announcing his retirement from the sport at the end of the 2016 season.

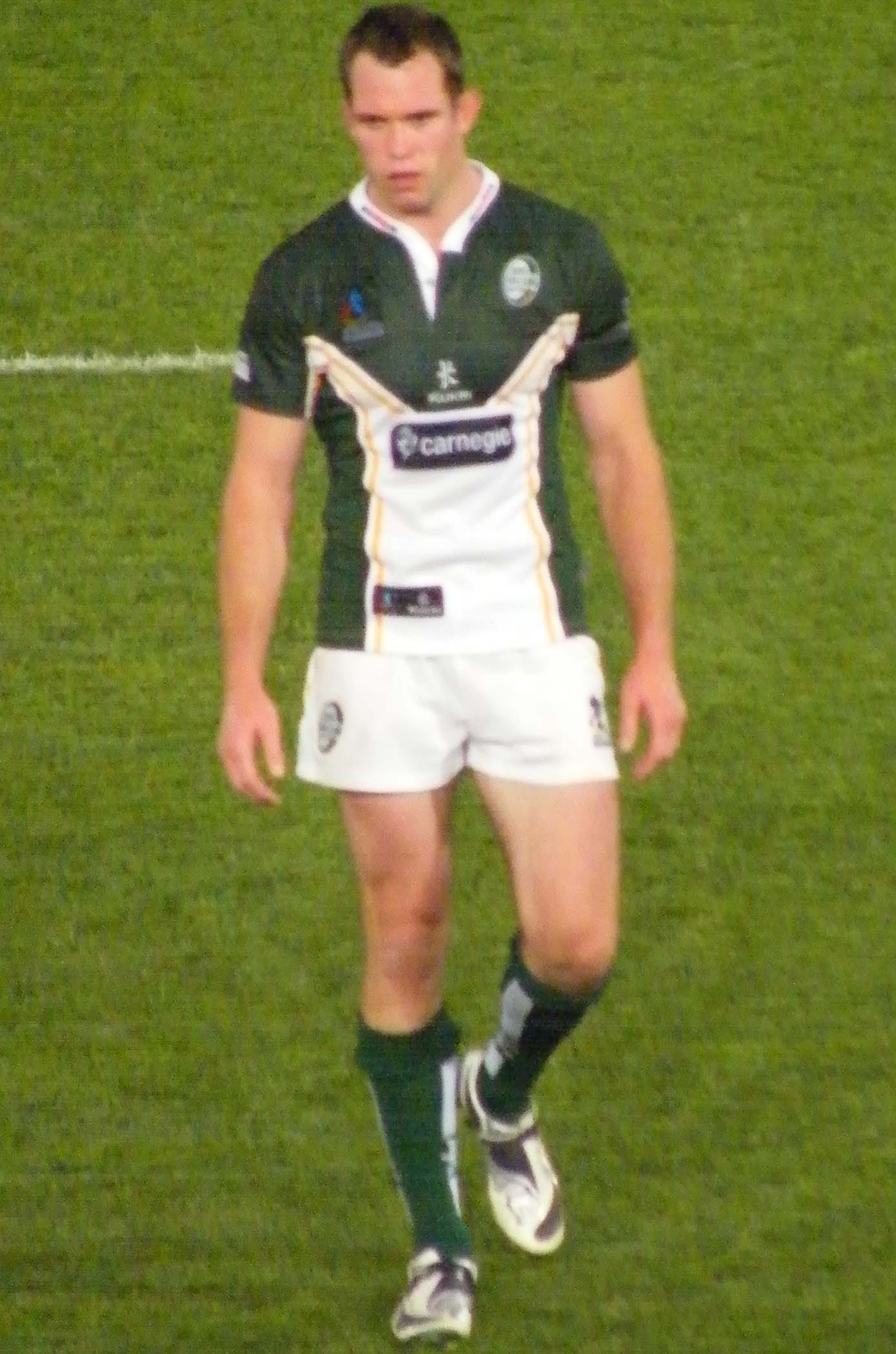
Richards playing for Ireland at the 2008 RLWC

== International career ==
Richards was born in Australia, but qualifies for Ireland due to his Irish parentage. He featured for Ireland in the 2008 and 2013 World Cups and in the 2009 European Cup.

== Honours ==
=== Parramatta Eels ===
- NRL Major Premiership:
  - Runner-up: 2001
- NRL Minor Premiership:
  - Winners: 2001

=== Wests Tigers ===
- NRL Major Premiership:
  - Winners: 2005

=== Wigan Warriors ===
- Super League
  - Winners (2): 2010, 2013
- League Leaders' Shield
  - Winners (2): 2010, 2012
  - Runner-up (1): 2011
- Challenge Cup
  - Winners (2): 2011, 2013
- World Club Challenge
  - Runner-up (1): 2011

=== Individual ===
- Man of Steel:
  - Winners (1): 2010
- Super League Dream Team
  - Winners (1): 2010
- RLWBA Player of the Year:
  - Winners (1): 2010
- Albert Goldthorpe Medal:
  - Winners (1): 2010
- Wigan Warriors Player of the Year
  - Winners (2): 2008, 2010
