= Phil Bailey =

Australian rugby league footballer

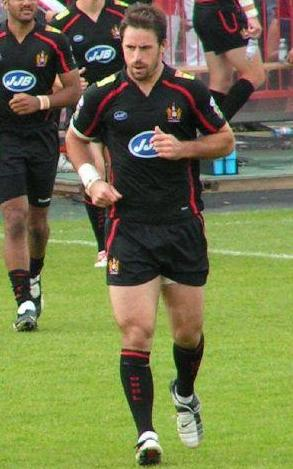

Personal information
- Full name: Phillip Bailey
- Born: 25 May 1980 (age 46) Inverell, New South Wales, Australia

Playing information
- Height: 189 cm (6 ft 2 in)
- Weight: 100 kg (15 st 10 lb)
- Position: Second-row, Centre
Club
Years	Team	Pld	T	G	FG	P
1999	Manly Sea Eagles	9	0	0	0	0
2001	Northern Eagles	15	1	0	0	4
2002–06	Cronulla Sharks	103	32	0	0	128
2007–10	Wigan Warriors	101	16	0	0	64
	Total	228	49	0	0	196
Representative
Years	Team	Pld	T	G	FG	P
2003	New South Wales	3	0	0	0	0
2003	Australia	4	2	0	0	8
- Relatives: Chris Bailey (brother)

Phil Bailey (born 25 May 1980) is a former New South Wales and Australian representative player. He previously played for the Cronulla-Sutherland Sharks, Wigan Warriors, Manly Warringah Sea Eagles and the Northern Eagles, primarily as a centre or second-row.

== Playing career ==
Bailey made his first grade debut for Manly Warringah in Round 5 1999 against South Sydney. At the end of 1999, Manly merged with arch rivals North Sydney to form the now defunct Northern Eagles side. Bailey played for the Northern Eagles in 2001 before joining Cronulla-Sutherland in 2002. Bailey made 19 appearances for Cronulla in his first season at the club as they reached the preliminary final against New Zealand but were defeated 16-10.

At the end of the 2003 NRL season, Bailey went on the 2003 Kangaroo tour of Great Britain and France, helping Australia to victory over The Lions in what, as of 2026, is the last time the two nations contested an Ashes series.

Bailey was signed to the Wigan Warriors in the Super League for the 2007, 2008, 2009, and 2010 seasons. He made his Wigan Warriors, Super League début in a 10–16 defeat by Warrington Wolves at the JJB Stadium on 9 February 2007.

== Post playing career ==
He has been involved in rugby union coaching and high performance roles around the world in places such as the United States and Hong Kong.

== Career highlights ==
- Junior Club: Inverell Hawks

== Representative games ==
- State Of Origin: Played 3 games in total for New South Wales
- International: Played 4 tests to date for Australia
