= Amos Roberts =

Australian rugby league footballer

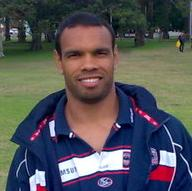
- Roberts with the Roosters in 2008

Personal information
- Born: 2 November 1980 (age 46) Kempsey, New South Wales, Australia

Playing information
- Height: 181 cm (5 ft 11 in)
- Weight: 92 kg (14 st 7 lb)
- Position: Wing, Fullback
Club
Years	Team	Pld	T	G	FG	P
2000–03	St. George Illawarra	65	29	26	0	168
2004	Penrith Panthers	23	23	32	0	156
2005–08	Sydney Roosters	89	54	42	0	300
2009–12	Wigan Warriors	55	27	6	0	120
	Total	232	133	106	0	744
Representative
Years	Team	Pld	T	G	FG	P
2004–08	NSW Country	5	4	0	0	16
2005	Prime Minister's XIII	2	0	0	0	0
- Relatives: Tyronne Roberts-Davis (nephew); James Roberts (nephew); Tyrone Roberts (cousin)

Amos Roberts (born 2 November 1980) is an Indigenous Australian former professional rugby league footballer. A Country New South Wales representative prolific try-scoring back, he played in Australia's National Rugby League for the St. George Illawarra Dragons, Penrith Panthers and Sydney Roosters clubs and in the Super League for the Wigan Warriors.

== Rugby league career ==
=== NRL career ===
Roberts made his NRL début in 2000 with the St George Illawarra Dragons, scoring 22 points in that match. In 2004 he signed with the Penrith Panthers and scored 23 tries in 23 games that year to become the competition's top try scorer that year. He signed with the Sydney Roosters in 2005. He scored 17 tries in 2005 and 18 tries in 2006.

Roberts injured his knee at the start of the 2007 season and made his return in Round 3 against the Manly-Warringah Sea Eagles. He scored his first try of 07 in Round 13 against the North Queensland Cowboys.

Roberts was set and ready to join close friend and fellow winger/fullback Nathan Merritt at the South Sydney Rabbitohs before the deal fell through due to the club announcing the signing of Panthers star Luke Lewis, however, this deal also fell through.

In October 2008, Roberts was released from the final year of his contract with the Roosters to take up a four-year deal with English Super League club Wigan Warriors.

=== Wigan Warriors ===
In 2010 Roberts has been in scintillating form scoring in all but 3 of his 10 appearances for Wigan including a hat-trick away at Castleford Tigers. His performances have helped put Wigan at the top of Super League and have potentially put him forward for the end-of-season Man of Steel award.

During the Easter Monday game against Wakefield Trinity Wildcats at the DW Stadium, Amos suffered an injury to his knee ligaments after colliding with the post in the process of scoring his 12th try of the season. He recovered to play the Leeds Rhinos on 29 May 2010 but struggled to get back into form.

In 2011 season Roberts made only 6 appearances for the club, spending much of it in the reserves unable to force his way into the squad.

On 12 May 2012 Roberts announced his retirement after several failed comebacks from the injury and complications that arose. His last appearance had been against Castleford Tigers almost a year prior.

== Career highlights ==
Roberts scored 22 points on début (1 try and 9 goals) with the St. George-Illawarra Dragons on 6 May 2000 against the Auckland Warriors. This is the standing National Rugby League premiership record for points scored on a first grade debut. He was selected as the Dally M Winger of the Year in 2004.

He has represented four times for Country vs City since 2004 and twice been selected to play in a Prime Minister's XIII (2005 and 2006).

== Personal life ==
Roberts is an Indigenous Australian of Bundjalung people. He is the uncle of the rugby league footballer James Roberts.

== Awards ==
In 2004, Roberts won the Deadly award for Outstanding Achievement in Rugby League. Roberts received the award for his "stellar start to the season, consistent all-round form and the fact he finished the season as the league's leading try-scorer."

== Music ==
In 2007, Roberts, along with South Sydney's Nathan Merritt, appeared in the music video for Anthony Mundine's Platinum Ryder single. Mundine is Roberts' cousin.

== NRL point scoring summary ==
Season	Team	Appearance	Interchange	Tries	Goals	F/G	Points
2000	St. George Illawarra Dragons	13	0	8	10	0	52
2001	St. George Illawarra Dragons	28	0	13	7	0	66
2002	St. George Illawarra Dragons	14	0	5	7	0	34
2003	St. George Illawarra Dragons	10	0	3	2	0	16
2004	Penrith Panthers	23	0	23	32	0	156
2005	Sydney Roosters	24	0	17	13	0	94
2006	Sydney Roosters	23	0	18	12	0	96
2007	Sydney Roosters	20	1	7	8	0	44
2008	Sydney Roosters	21	0	12	10	0	68
