= List of Super League records =

The top tier of English rugby league was renamed the Super League for the start of the 1996 season. The following page details the records and statistics of the Super League.

== League records ==
=== Titles ===
- Most titles: 10
  St Helens
- Most consecutive title wins: 4
  St Helens (2019, 2020, 2021, 2022)
- Most Grand Final appearances: 13
  St Helens & Wigan Warriors

=== League Leaders Shield ===
- Most League Leaders Shield wins: 8
  St Helens
- Most consecutive League Leaders Shield wins: 4
  St Helens (2005, 2006, 2007, 2008)
- Biggest League Leaders Shield winning margin: 16 points
  St Helens (2019)

== Team records ==
- Most points scored in a season: 1,152
  Leeds Rhinos (2005)
- Most points scored in a season (points per game): 43.18
  St Helens (1996)
- Most tries scored in a season: 213
  Leeds Rhinos (2005)
- Most goals scored in a season: 204
  Bradford Bulls (2001)
- Most drop goals scored in a season: 11
  Halifax (1999)
  Warrington Wolves (2002)
- Fewest points conceded in a season: 195
  St Helens (2020)
- Fewest points conceded in a season (points per game): 9.65
  Wigan Warriors (1998)
- Most points conceded in a season: 1,237
  London Broncos (2014)
- Longest undefeated streak and longest winning streak: 21 games
  Bradford Bulls (24 August 1996 – 22 August 1997)
- Longest winless streak and longest losing streak: 27 games
  Halifax (7 March – 21 September 2003)

== Individual records ==
=== Most games played ===
Rank	Games	Player	Clubs	Years
1	495	James Roby	St. Helens	2004–2023
2	454	Kevin Sinfield	Leeds Rhinos	1997–2015
3	452	Andy Lynch	Castleford Tigers, Bradford Bulls, Hull F.C.	1999–2017
4	442	Paul Wellens	St. Helens	1998–2015
5	438	Jamie Peacock	Bradford Bulls, Leeds Rhinos	1999–2015
6	432	Leon Pryce	Bradford Bulls, St. Helens, Catalans Dragons, Hull F.C.	1998–2016
7	430	Louie McCarthy-Scarsbrook	Harlequins RL, St. Helens	2006–2023
=8	429	Rob Burrow	Leeds Rhinos	2001–2017
=8	429	Ben Westwood	Wakefield Trinity Wildcats, Warrington Wolves	1999–2019
10	425	Ryan Hall	Leeds Rhinos, Hull Kingston Rovers	2007–2018, 2021–2026
Source:https://www.rugbyleagueproject.org/competitions/super-league/players.html?pos=&ord=~app.

=== Most tries scored ===
Rank	Tries	Player	Clubs	Years
1	281	Josh Charnley	Hull Kingston Rovers, Wigan Warriors, Warrington Wolves, Leigh Leopards	2010–2016, 2018–
2	274	Ryan Hall	Leeds Rhinos, Hull Kingston Rovers	2007–2018, 2021–2026
3	247	Danny McGuire	Leeds Rhinos, Hull Kingston Rovers	2001–2019
4	210	Tommy Makinson	St. Helens, Catalans Dragons	2011–2026
=5	199	Keith Senior	Sheffield Eagles, Leeds Rhinos	1996–2011
=5	199	Paul Wellens	St. Helens	1998–2015
7	196	Jermaine McGillvary	Huddersfield Giants	2010–2023
8	186	Ryan Atkins	Wakefield Trinity Wildcats, Warrington Wolves	2006–2020
9	182	Tom Briscoe	Hull F.C., Leeds Rhinos, Leigh Leopards	2008–2026
10	173	Leon Pryce	Bradford Bulls, St. Helens, Catalans Dragons, Hull F.C.	1998–2016

==== In a season ====
Tries	Player	Club	Season
40	Denny Solomona	Castleford Tigers	2016
38	Danny McGuire	Leeds Rhinos	2004
38	Lesley Vainikolo	Bradford Bulls	2004
38	Greg Eden	Castleford Tigers	2017
34	Josh Charnley	Wigan Warriors	2013
34	Joel Monaghan	Warrington Wolves	2014
32	Lesley Vainikolo	Bradford Bulls	2005
32	Josh Charnley	Wigan Warriors	2012
31	Ryan Hall	Leeds Rhinos	2009
31	Pat Richards	Wigan Warriors	2010
31	Bevan French	Wigan Warriors	2022

- Most tries in a game: 7
  Bevan French (15 July 2022)
- Fastest try in a game: 7 seconds
  Ben Crooks (16 April 2021)

=== Goals ===
- Most goals in a season:

178, Henry Paul ( Bradford Bulls, 2001)

- Most goals in a game (inc' drop goals):

14, Henry Paul (for Bradford Bulls v. Salford Red Devils, 25 June 2000)

==== Most drop goals ====
Rank	Drop goals	Player	Clubs	Years
1	70	Lee Briers	St. Helens, Warrington Wolves	1997–2013
2	50	Marc Sneyd	Salford City Reds, Castleford Tigers, Hull F.C., Warrington Wolves	2010–2026
=3	32	Matty Smith	St. Helens, Celtic Crusaders, Salford City Reds, Wigan Warriors, Catalans Dragons, Warrington Wolves	2006–2019
=3	32	Danny Brough	Hull F.C., Castleford Tigers, Wakefield Trinity Wildcats, Huddersfield Giants	2005–2020
5	31	Kevin Sinfield	Leeds Rhinos	1997–2015
6	28	Luke Gale	Harlequins RL, Bradford Bulls, Castleford Tigers, Leeds Rhinos, Hull F.C., Wakefield Trinity	2009–2024
7	23	Paul Deacon	Oldham Bears, Bradford Bulls, Wigan Warriors	1997–2011
8	21	Jamie Rooney	Castleford Tigers, Wakefield Trinity Wildcats, Warrington Wolves	2001–2009
9	20	Sean Long	Wigan Warriors, St. Helens, Hull F.C.	1996–2011
10	18	Graham Holroyd	Leeds Rhinos, Halifax Blue Sox, Salford City Reds, Huddersfield Giants	1996–2003

- Most drop goals in a season:

11, Lee Briers ( Warrington Wolves, 2002)

- Most drop goals in a game:

5, Lee Briers (for Warrington Wolves v. Halifax, 25 May 2002)

=== Most points scored ===
Rank	Points	Player	Clubs	Years
1	3,443	Kevin Sinfield	Leeds Rhinos	1997–2015
2	2,460	Danny Brough	Hull F.C., Castleford Tigers, Wakefield Trinity Wildcats, Huddersfield Giants	2005–2020
3	2,413	Paul Deacon	Oldham Bears, Bradford Bulls, Wigan Warriors	1997–2011
4	2,400	Marc Sneyd	Salford City Reds, Castleford Tigers, Hull F.C., Warrington Wolves	2010–2026
5	2,376	Andy Farrell	Wigan Warriors	1996–2004
6	2,284	Pat Richards	Wigan Warriors, Catalans Dragons	2006–2013, 2016
7	2,267	Danny Tickle	Halifax Blue Sox, Wigan Warriors, Hull F.C., Widnes Vikings, Castleford Tigers, Leigh Centurions, Hull Kingston Rovers	2000–2018
8	2,232	Lee Briers	St. Helens, Warrington Wolves	1997–2013
9	2,200	Sean Long	Wigan Warriors, St. Helens, Hull F.C.	1996–2011
10	1,694	Stefan Ratchford	Salford City Reds, Warrington Wolves	2007–2025

==== In a season ====
Points	Scoring	Player	Club	Season
434	31t, 155g	Pat Richards	Wigan Warriors	2010
425	17t, 176g, 5fg	Andy Farrell	Wigan Warriors	2001
392	8t, 178g, 4fg	Henry Paul	Bradford Bulls	2001
390	22t, 151g	Sean Long	St. Helens	2000
359	12t, 153g, 5fg	Paul Deacon	Bradford Bulls	2005
357	9t, 160g, 1fg	Andy Farrell	Wigan Warriors	2000
343	18t, 135g, 1fg	Iestyn Harris	Leeds Rhinos	1999
342	10t, 150g, 2fg	Henry Paul	Bradford Bulls	2000
334	14t, 135g, 8fg	Luke Gale	Castleford Tigers	2017
330	21t, 123g	Jamie Foster	St. Helens	2011

- Most points in a game:

42, Iestyn Harris (for Leeds Rhinos v. Huddersfield Giants, 16 July 1999)

=== Oldest players ===
Age	Player	Club	Year
39 years and 283 days	Steve Menzies	Catalans Dragons	2013
39 years and 119 days	Gareth Ellis	Hull F.C.	2020
38 years and 302 days	Ryan Hall	Leeds Rhinos	2026
38 years and 187 days	Brad Davis	Castleford Tigers	2006
38 years and 77 days	Adrian Morley	Salford Red Devils	2015
38 years and 56 days	Ben Westwood	Warrington Wolves	2019
38 years and 43 days	Jamie Jones-Buchanan	Leeds Rhinos	2019
38 years and 17 days	Ben Jones-Bishop	York Knights	2026
38 years and 3 days	Sean O'Loughlin	Wigan Warriors	2020
37 years and 337 days	Andy Lynch	Castleford Tigers	2017

=== Oldest premiership winners ===
Age	Player	Club	Year
37 years and 300 days	Jamie Peacock	Leeds Rhinos	2015
37 years and 274 days	Michael McIlorum	Hull Kingston Rovers	2025
37 years and 195 days	Kylie Leuluai	Leeds Rhinos	2015
36 years and 306 days	James Roby	St. Helens	2022
36 years and 298 days	Jay Pitts	Wakefield Trinity	2026
36 years and 264 days	Jared Waerea-Hargreaves	Hull Kingston Rovers	2025
36 years and 253 days	Louie McCarthy-Scarsbrook	St. Helens	2022
36 years and 67 days	Jamie Jones-Buchanan	Leeds Rhinos	2017
36 years and 47 days	Zeb Taia	St. Helens	2020
35 years and 323 days	Sean O'Loughlin	Wigan Warriors	2018

=== Youngest players ===
Age	Player	Club	Year
16 years and 210 days	Scott Moore	St. Helens	2004
16 years and 262 days	John Duffy	Warrington Wolves	1997
16 years and 274 days	Richard Horne	Hull Sharks	1999
16 years and 308 days	Chev Walker	Leeds Rhinos	1999
16 years and 338 days	Scott Barrow	St. Helens	1997
16 years and 344 days	Kevin Sinfield	Leeds Rhinos	1997
16 years and 347 days	Joe Arundel	Castleford Tigers	2008
16 years and 353 days	Leon Pryce	Bradford Bulls	1998
17 years and 8 days	Lucas Albert	Catalans Dragons	2015
17 years and 11 days	Jordan Crowther	Wakefield Trinity Wildcats	2014

=== Youngest premiership winners ===
Age	Player	Club	Year
18 years and 60 days	Jack Walker	Leeds Rhinos	2017
18 years and 324 days	Stevie Ward	Leeds Rhinos	2012
19 years and 91 days	Greg Richards	St. Helens	2014
19 years and 103 days	Tim Jonkers	St. Helens	2000
19 years and 117 days	Danny Arnold	St. Helens	1996
19 years and 167 days	Luke Thompson	St. Helens	2014
19 years and 224 days	Paul Wellens	St. Helens	1999
19 years and 255 days	Jack Welsby	St. Helens	2020
19 years and 255 days	Lewis Dodd	St. Helens	2021
19 years and 297 days	Jon Bennison	St. Helens	2022

=== Coaches ===
- Most Super League championships:

4, Brian McDermott (for Leeds Rhinos in 2011, 2012, 2015, and 2017)

- Most Super League matches

536, Tony Smith (for Huddersfield Giants 2001 & 2003, Leeds Rhinos 2004–2007, Warrington Wolves 2009–2017,
Hull KR 2019–2022, & Hull 2023–2024)

== Match records ==
=== Biggest winning margin ===
Rank	Points	Winning team	Defeated team	Score	Venue	Date
1	82	St. Helens	Salford Red Devils	82–0	Totally Wicked Stadium	15 February 2025
=2	80	Leeds Rhinos	Huddersfield Giants	86–6	Headingley Stadium	16 July 1999
=2	80	Bradford Bulls	Salford City Reds	96–16	Odsal Stadium	25 June 2000
=2	80	Warrington Wolves	Wakefield Trinity Wildcats	80–0	Halliwell Jones Stadium	11 April 2015
=5	78	Wigan Warriors	Hull Kingston Rovers	84–6	MS3 Craven Park	1 April 2013
=5	78	Wigan Warriors	Bradford Bulls	84–6	DW Stadium	21 April 2014
=7	76	Hull F.C.	Salford City Reds	82–6	KC Stadium	2 May 2004
=7	76	Warrington Wolves	Harlequins RL	82–6	Halliwell Jones Stadium	20 March 2011
=9	74	Wigan Warriors	Workington Town	78–4	Central Park	24 August 1996
=9	74	Leeds Rhinos	Leigh Centurions	74–0	The Coliseum	7 August 2005
=9	74	St. Helens	Leigh Centurions	78–4	The Coliseum	4 September 2005
=9	74	Hull F.C.	Salford Red Devils	80–6	MKM Stadium	10 August 2025

- Biggest home win: 82–0, St. Helens v. Salford Red Devils (15 February 2025)
- Biggest away win: 6–84, Hull Kingston Rovers v. Wigan Warriors (1 April 2013)

=== Most points scored in a game ===
Rank	Points	Winning team	Defeated team	Score	Venue	Date
1	112	Bradford Bulls	Salford City Reds	96–16	Odsal Stadium	25 June 2000
=2	96	Bradford Bulls	Huddersfield Giants	78–18	Valley Parade	10 June 2001
=2	96	Bradford Bulls	Warrington Wolves	84–12	Wilderspool Stadium	9 September 2001
=2	96	Hull F.C.	Leigh Centurions	76–20	KC Stadium	14 August 2005
5	94	Huddersfield Giants	Hull F.C.	76–18	John Smith's Stadium	19 September 2013
=6	92	Leeds Rhinos	Huddersfield Giants	86–6	Headingley Stadium	16 July 1999
=6	92	Warrington Wolves	London Broncos	82–10	Priestfield Stadium	8 June 2013
=6	92	Wigan Warriors	York Knights	72–20	LNER Community Stadium	20 June 2026
=9	90	Wigan Warriors	Hull Kingston Rovers	84–6	MS3 Craven Park	1 April 2013
=9	90	Wigan Warriors	Bradford Bulls	84–6	DW Stadium	21 April 2014
=9	90	Warrington Wolves	Hull F.C.	80–10	Halliwell Jones Stadium	30 August 2018

- Most points scored by one team in a game: 96, Bradford Bulls
- Most tries scored by one team in a game: 17, Bradford Bulls
- Lowest scoring game: 0–1 (g.p.), Wigan Warriors v. Leigh Leopards (13 February 2025)
- Lowest scoring game during regulation 80 minutes: 0–0
- Highest scoring game with no tries: 5–2, Salford City Reds v. Harlequins RL (15 June 2007)

== Attendance records ==
- Highest Super League attendance (excluding Magic Weekend and Grand Final):

31,555, Catalans Dragons v. Wigan Warriors (at Camp Nou, 18 May 2019)

- Lowest Super League attendance (excluding games played behind closed doors):

500, PSG v. Salford City Reds (at Stade Sebastien Charlety, 2 July 1997)

- Highest Magic Weekend attendance, weekend:

77,442 Hill Dickinson Stadium (4-5 July 2026)

- Lowest Magic Weekend attendance, weekend:

52,043 Murrayfield (1–2 May 2010)

- Highest Grand Final attendance:

73,512, Leeds Rhinos v. Wigan Warriors (at Old Trafford, 10 October 2015)

- Lowest Grand Final attendance (excluding 2020 Grand Final played behind closed doors):

43,533, Leeds Rhinos v. Wigan Warriors (at Old Trafford, 24 October 1998)

== All-time Super League table ==
Table only includes league games and not playoffs, finals or The Qualifiers.

Pos	Team	Pld	W	D	L	PF	PA	PD	Pts
1	St Helens	776	551	15	210	23064	13963	+9101	1115 (Note: St Helens deducted 2 points in 2003 for salary cap breaches.)
2	Wigan Warriors	780	528	24	228	21897	13602	+8295	1074 (Note: Wigan: Deducted 2 points in 2006 for salary cap breaches. Deducted 4 points in 2007 for salary cap breaches.)
3	Leeds Rhinos	779	475	18	286	20911	15726	+5185	968
4	Warrington Wolves	776	413	14	349	19718	17519	+2199	840
5	Hull F.C.	732	348	23	361	16350	16921	−571	717 (Note: Hull FC deducted 2 points in 2003 for salary cap breaches.)
6	Castleford Tigers	722	309	21	392	15863	18568	−2705	639
7	Bradford Bulls	509	308	17	184	14620	11253	+3367	617 (Note: Bradford: Deducted 2 points in 2006 for salary cap breaches. Deducted 2 points in 2007 for salary cap breaches. Deducted 6 points in 2012 for entering administration. Deducted 6 points in 2014 for entering administration.)
8	Huddersfield Giants	708	299	15	394	15374	17388	−2014	613
9	Catalans Dragons	509	253	11	245	11628	11832	−204	517
10	Wakefield Trinity	687	250	7	430	14499	18695	−4196	501 (Note: Wakefield: Deducted 2 points in 2001 for salary cap breaches. Deducted 4 points in 2011 for entering administration.)
11	Salford	701	250	8	443	13615	19316	−5701	492 (Note: Salford: Deducted 2 points in 2013 for fielding an extra man. Deducted 6 points in 2016 for salary cap breaches. Deducted 6 points in 2020 for financial breaches. Deducted 2 points in 2025 for fielding weakened team.)
12	Hull Kingston Rovers	459	216	10	233	10516	10744	−228	442
13	London Broncos	565	198	20	347	11615	15932	−4317	416
14	Widnes Vikings	285	95	8	182	5895	8309	−2414	198
15	Halifax Panthers	209	76	4	129	4646	5912	−1266	154 (Note: Halifax deducted 2 points in 2003 for salary cap breaches.)
16	Leigh Leopards	154	60	3	91	2996	4053	−1057	123
17	Sheffield Eagles	97	37	3	57	2027	2663	−636	77
18	Newcastle Thunder	30	19	1	10	775	576	+199	39
19	Crusaders	81	21	0	60	1431	2463	−1032	38 (Note: Crusaders deducted 4 points in 2011 for entering administration.)
20	Oldham	44	13	2	29	934	1312	−378	28
21	Paris Saint-Germain	44	9	1	34	760	1367	−607	19
22	Toulouse Olympique	27	5	0	22	421	745	−324	10
23	Workington Town	22	2	1	19	325	1021	−696	5
24	York Knights	0	0	0	0	0	0	0	0
25	Toronto Wolfpack	6	0	0	6	70	214	−144	0 (Note: Toronto results expunged following withdrawal in 2020, thus not included in opponents totals.)

Updated to match(es) played on 19 September 2025 (end of 2025 season). Source:
Rules for classification: 1) Points; 2) Points difference; 3) Number of points scored.
Notes:

Current Super League teams
Defunct teams

== See also ==
- Super League
- List of players with 1,000 Super League points
