= List of current and former Super League venues =

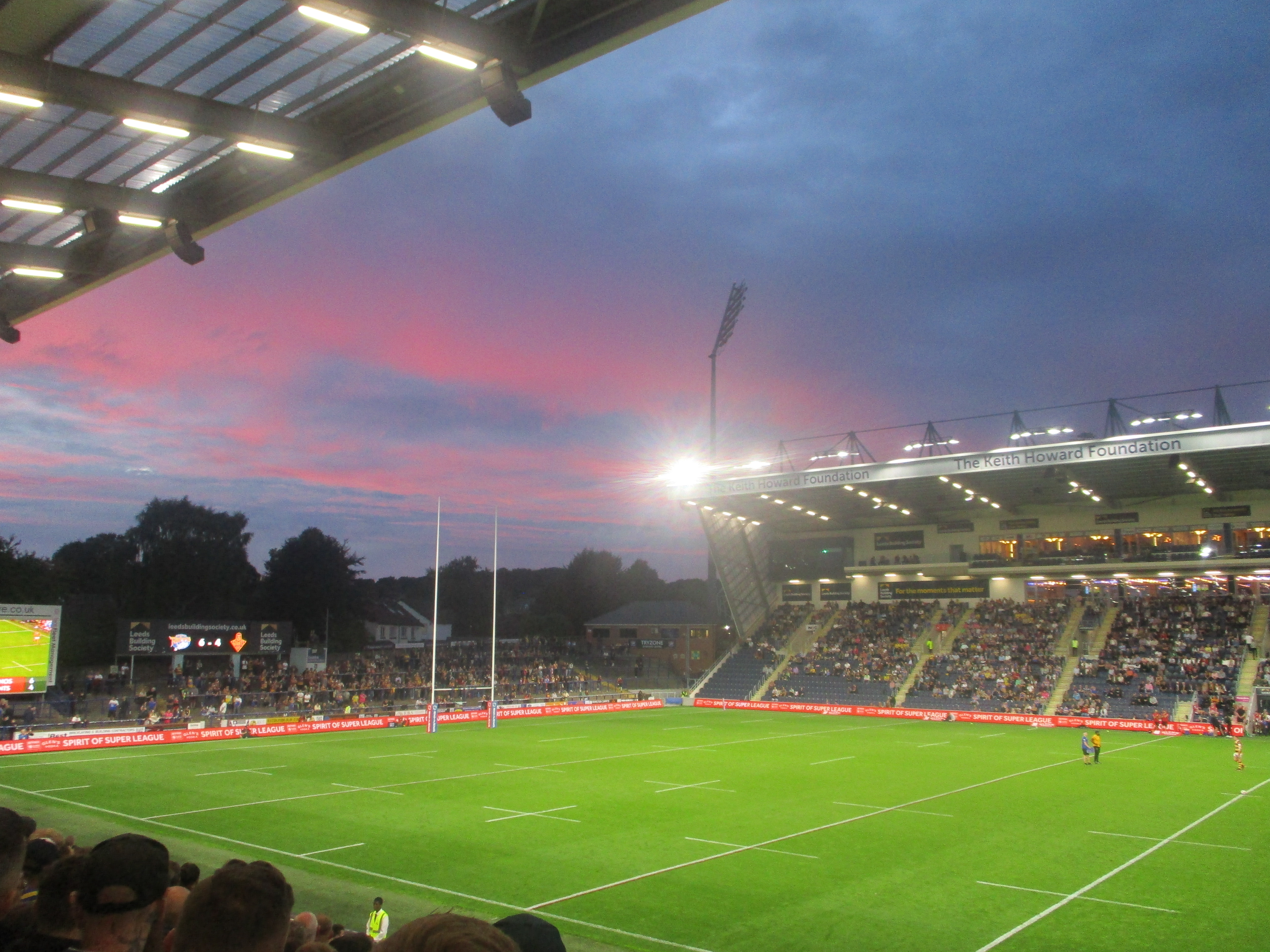
Headingley Rugby Stadium is the most frequently used Super League venue as of 14 June 2025, having hosted 421 match across all seasons of the competition

As of 14 June 2025, the Super League has been held at 73 different venues. The following is a list of all venues with reason for each as a venue of the competition:

== Home stadiums ==
Bold indicates a current venue

Club	Stadium	Location	Capacity	Duration
Bradford Bulls	**Odsal Stadium**	(England) Bradford	26,019	1996–2000; 2003–2014; 2026–present
Bradford Bulls	Valley Parade	(England) Bradford	24,840	2001–2002
Castleford Tigers	**Wheldon Road**	(England) Castleford	10,500	1996–present
Catalans Dragons	Stade Aimé Giral	(England) Perpignan	14,593	2006–2007
Catalans Dragons	**Stade Gilbert Brutus**	(England) Perpignan	13,000	2007–present
Celtic Crusaders	Brewery Field	(Wales) Bridgend	8,000	2009
Celtic Crusaders	Racecourse Ground	(Wales) Wrexham	10,771	2010–2011
Gateshead Thunder	Gateshead International Stadium	(England) Gateshead	11,800	1999
Halifax Panthers	Thrum Hall	(England) Halifax	9,832	1996–1997
Halifax Panthers	The Shay	(England) Halifax	10,401	1998–2003
Huddersfield Giants	**Kirklees Stadium**	(England) Huddersfield	24,121	1998–present
Hull F.C.	The Boulevard	(England) Hull	10,500	1998–2002
Hull F.C.	**MKM Stadium**	(England) Hull	25,586	2003–present
Hull Kingston Rovers	**Craven Park**	(England) Hull	11,000	2007–2016; 2018–present
Leeds Rhinos	**Headingley Rugby Stadium**	(England) Leeds	19,700	1996–present
Leigh Leopards	Hilton Park	(England) Leigh	10,000	2005
Leigh Leopards	**Leigh Sports Village**	(England) Leigh	12,000	2017; 2021; 2023–present
London Broncos	The Valley	(England) Charlton	27,111	1996; 2000–2001
London Broncos	Twickenham Stoop	(England) Twickenham	14,800	1997–1999; 2007–2013
London Broncos	Griffin Park	(England) Brentford	12,300	2002–2006
London Broncos	The Hive Stadium	(England) Edgware	6,500	2014
London Broncos	Trailfinders Sports Ground	(England) West Ealing	5,388	2019
London Broncos	Plough Lane	(England) Wimbledon	9,215	2024
Oldham Roughyeds	Watersheddings	(England) Oldham	9,000	1996–1997
Oldham Roughyeds	Boundary Park	(England) Oldham	13,186	1997
Paris Saint-Germain	Stade Sébastien Charléty	(France) Paris	19,142	1996–1997
Salford Red Devils	The Willows	(England) Salford	11,363	1997–2011
Salford Red Devils	Salford Community Stadium	(England) Salford	11,404	2012–2025
Sheffield Eagles	Don Valley Stadium	(England) Sheffield	25,000	1996–1999
St Helens	Knowsley Road	(England) St Helens	17,500	1996–2011
St Helens	**Langtree Park**	(England) St Helens	18,000	2012–present
Toronto Wolfpack	Lamport Stadium	(Canada) Toronto	9,600	2020
Toulouse Olympique	**Stade Ernest-Wallon**	(France) Toulouse	19,500	2022; 2026–present
Wakefield Trinity	**Belle Vue**	(England) Wakefield	9,252	1999–present
Warrington Wolves	Wilderspool Stadium	(England) Warrington	9,200	1996–2003
Warrington Wolves	**Halliwell Jones Stadium**	(England) Warrington	15,300	2003–present
Widnes Vikings	Halton Stadium	(England) Widnes	13,350	2002–2005; 2012–2018
Wigan Warriors	Central Park	(England) Wigan	18,000	1996–1999
Wigan Warriors	**Brick Community Stadium**	(England) Wigan	25,138	1999–present
Workington Town	Derwent Park	(England) Workington	10,000	1996
York Knights	**York Community Stadium**	(England) York	8,500	2026–present

== 'On the Road' games ==
Stadium	Location	Capacity	Game (Years)	Reason for move
Adams Park	(England) High Wycombe	9,448	London vs Bradford (2013)	Damaged pitch at Twickenham Stoop
Allegiant Stadium	(United States) Las Vegas	65,000	Wigan vs Warrington (2025); Hull KR vs Leeds (2026); Leigh vs Bradford (2027)	Annual Rugby League Las Vegas event
Anfield	(England) Liverpool	61,276	St Helens vs Castleford (1997)	Club growth attempt
Bramall Lane	(England) Sheffield	32,050	Sheffield vs Leeds (1996)	Unknown
Brisbane Road	(England) Leyton	9,271	London vs Bradford (2011)	Unknown
Camp Nou	(Spain) Barcelona	99,354	Catalans vs Wigan (2019)	Invitation from FC Barcelona
Cardiff Arms Park	(Wales) Cardiff	12,125	St Helens vs Sheffield (1996)	1998 On the Road match
Crown Flatt	(England) Dewsbury	5,100	Huddersfield vs Wigan (2025)	Home stadium unavailability due to a Stereophonics concert
Crown Flatt	(England) Dewsbury	5,100	Huddersfield vs Toulouse (2026)	Home stadium needed reseeding
The Den	(England) New Cross	20,146	Wigan vs Catalans (2015)	Stengthen Wigan's commercial links in London
Elland Road	(England) Leeds	37,645	Leeds vs Hull KR (2018); Leeds vs Castleford (2018)	Home stadium unavailability due to redevelopment work
Estadi Olímpic Lluís Companys	(Spain) Barcelona	55,926	Catalans vs Warrington (2009)	Unknown
Gateshead International Stadium	(England) Gateshead	11,800	Leeds vs Salford (1998); Hull F.C. vs Huddersfield (1998)	1998 On the Road matches
The Gnoll	(Wales) Neath	6,000	Crusaders vs Castleford (2010)	Unknown
Molesey Road	(England) Hersham	3,500	London vs Catalans (2013)	Unknown
Oakwell	(England) Barnsley	23,287	Wakefield Trinity vs St Helens (1999)	Unknown
Parc des Sports et de l'Amitié	(France) Narbonne	12,000	Paris Saint-Germain vs Halifax (1997); Catalans vs Hull F.C. Catalans vs Salford (2006)	Unknown
Priestfield Stadium	(England) Gillingham	11,582	London vs Hull F.C. (2012); London vs Warrington (2013)	Unknown
RDS Arena	(Republic of Ireland) Dublin	20,600	Warrington vs Wigan (2027); St Helens vs Hull F.C. (2027)	Super League Dublin event
Rodney Parade	(Wales) Newport	8,700	Crusaders vs Leeds (2009)	Trial ahead of move from Brewery Field
Saltergate	(England) Chesterfield	8,504	Sheffield vs Bradford (1999)	Unknown
Sixfields Stadium	(England) Northampton	8,203	Halifax vs Sheffield (1998)	1998 On the Road match
Stade Albert Domec	(France) Carcassonne	10,000	London vs Warrington (2003); Catalans vs Castleford (2006)	Unknown
Stade de la Mosson	(France) Montpellier	20,484	Catalans vs Wigan (2011)	Unknown
Stade de la Méditerranée	(France) Béziers	18,555	Catalans vs Hull F.C. (2008)	Unknown
Stade Jean-Bouin	(France) Paris	20,000	Catalans vs Wigan (2026)	Celebration of 20 years of Catalans playing in Super League and 30 years of French teams playing in Super League
Saint-Michel Legion Stadium	(France) Canet-en-Roussillon	Unknown	Catalans vs St Helens (2006)	Unknown
Stade Yves-du-Manoir	(France) Montpellier	15,697	Catalans vs Wigan (2011)	Unknown
Stonebridge Road	(England) Northfleet	4,769	London vs Castleford (2024)	Unknown
Talbot Athletic Ground	(Wales) Port Talbot	Unknown	London vs Widnes (2003)	Unknown
Tynecastle Stadium	(Scotland) Edinburgh	19,852	London vs Bradford (1998)	1998 On the Road match
Tynecastle Stadium	(Scotland) Edinburgh	19,852	Gateshead vs Wigan (1999)	Unknown
Vetch Field	(Wales) Swansea	11,475	St Helens vs Wigan (1998)	1998 On the Road match
Welford Road	(England) Leicester	25,849	London vs Bradford (1999); London vs Bradford (2001); London vs Hull F.C. (2004)	Attempts to showcase and develop rugby league in The Midlands
Wollongong Showground	(Australia) Wollongong	23,750	Wigan vs Hull F.C. (2018)	Part of a commercial deal to boost the visibility of British rugby league in Australia. Both teams had taken a pre season tour to Australia playing two National Rugby League sides each before contesting their opening fixture against each other in Wollongong.

== Grand Final ==
Stadium	Location	Capacity	Years
Old Trafford	(England) Old Trafford	74,244	1998–2019; 2021–present
KCOM Stadium	(England) Kingston upon Hull	25,586	2020

== Magic Weekend ==
Stadium	Location	Capacity	Years
Millennium Stadium	(Wales) Cardiff	74,500	2007–2008; 2011
Murrayfield Stadium	(Scotland) Edinburgh	67,144	2009–2010
Etihad Stadium	(England) Manchester	55,097	2012–2014
St James' Park	(England) Newcastle upon Tyne	52,405	2015–2018; 2021–2023; 2025
Anfield	(England) Liverpool	54,074	2019
Elland Road	(England) Leeds	37,792	2024
Hill Dickinson Stadium	(England) Liverpool	52,769	2026–2027
Stade Pierre-Fabre	(France) Castres	12,300	2026

== See also ==
- English rugby league venues
- List of National Rugby League stadiums
