= 2011 Crusaders Rugby League season =

Welsh rugby season

- Super League XVI Rank: 14th
- Challenge Cup: Fourth round
- 2011 record: Wins: 6; draws: 0; losses: 22
- Points scored: For: 527; against: 857

Team information
- Stadium: Racecourse Ground
← 2010	List of seasons

The 2011 Crusaders Rugby League season was the club's second year in the Super League. Despite going into administration at the end of 2010, the club was readmitted to the Super League for the 2011 season, but was docked four points for breaching insolvency rules. Crusaders struggled throughout the season, and finished bottom of the league.

In July 2011, Crusaders announced that they would not be competing in the Super League from next season after withdrawing their application due to financial concerns.

== Super League table ==
Pos	Team	Pld	W	D	L	PF	PA	PD	Pts	Qualification
1	Warrington Wolves (L)	27	22	0	5	1072	401	+671	44	Play-offs
2	Wigan Warriors	27	20	3	4	852	432	+420	43	Play-offs
3	St Helens	27	17	3	7	782	515	+267	37	Play-offs
4	Huddersfield Giants	27	16	0	11	707	524	+183	32	Play-offs
5	Leeds Rhinos (C)	27	15	1	11	757	603	+154	31	Play-offs
6	Catalans Dragons	27	15	1	11	689	626	+63	31	Play-offs
7	Hull Kingston Rovers	27	14	0	13	713	692	+21	28	Play-offs
8	Hull F.C.	27	13	1	13	718	569	+149	27	Play-offs
9	Castleford Tigers	27	12	2	13	664	808	−144	26	
10	Bradford Bulls	27	9	2	16	570	826	−256	20	
11	Salford City Reds	27	10	0	17	542	809	−267	20	
12	Harlequins	27	6	1	20	524	951	−427	13	
13	Wakefield Trinity Wildcats	27	7	0	20	453	957	−504	10 (Note: Wakefield deducted 4 points for entering administration.)	
14	Crusaders	27	6	0	21	527	857	−330	8 (Note: Crusaders deducted 4 points for entering administration.)	

Source: rugbyleagueproject.org
Rules for classification: 1) Points; 2) Points difference; 3) Number of points scored;
(C) Champions; (L) League Leaders' Shield winners

== 2011 squad ==
No.	Player	Apps	Tries	Goals	DGs	Points
1	Clinton Schifcofske	25	2	63	0	134
2	Gareth Thomas	18	4	0	0	16
3	Tony Martin	24	9	1	0	38
4	Vince Mellars	24	6	0	0	24
5	Stuart Reardon	26	11	0	0	44
6	Michael Witt	25	7	12	3	55
7	Jarrod Sammut	22	12	0	0	48
8	Ryan O'Hara	25	1	0	0	4
9	Lincoln Withers	20	1	0	0	4
10	Mark Bryant	23	0	0	0	0
11	Hep Cahill	17	3	0	0	12
12	Jason Chan	23	4	0	0	16
13	Frank Winterstein	19	1	0	0	4
14	Adam Peek	3	0	0	0	0
15	Jordan James	15	2	0	0	8
16	Ben Flower	23	2	0	0	8
17	Rhys Hanbury	10	5	0	0	20
18	Elliot Kear	13	5	0	0	20
19	Lloyd White	19	8	0	0	32
20	Gil Dudson	11	0	0	0	0
21	Paul Johnson	10	0	0	0	0
22	Richard Moore	22	1	0	0	4
23	Peter Lupton	19	6	0	0	24
24	Lee Williams	8	0	0	0	0
25	Jamie Murphy	2	0	0	0	0
26	Rhys Williams	6	3	0	0	12
27	Jordan Tansey	18	5	0	0	20
28	Andy Bracek	2	0	0	0	0
29	Aled James	1	0	0	0	0
30	Joe Burke	1	0	0	0	0
31	Dalton Grant	1	0	0	0	0

== 2011 Transfers ==
=== In ===
Acquisitions
Player	Signed from	When signed
Paul Johnson	Wakefield Trinity Wildcats	November 2010
Richard Moore	Wakefield Trinity Wildcats	December 2010
Rhys Williams	Warrington Wolves (loan)	February 2011
Jordan Tansey	Hull F.C.	March 2011
Andy Bracek	Free agent	March 2011

=== Out ===
Losses
Player	Signed for	When left
Jamie Thackray	Barrow Raiders	November 2010
Weller Hauraki	Leeds Rhinos	November 2010
Gil Dudson	Halifax (dual registration)	June 2011
Hep Cahill	Widnes Vikings	July 2011
Jason Chan	Huddersfield Giants	August 2011
Michael Witt	Harlequins RL	August 2011
Mark Bryant	Harlequins RL	August 2011
Vince Mellars	Wakefield Trinity Wildcats	August 2011
Richard Moore	Leeds Rhinos	August 2011
Ryan O'Hara	Hull Kingston Rovers	August 2011
Rhys Hanbury	Widnes Vikings	September 2011
Jordan James	Salford City Reds	September 2011
Lincoln Withers	Hull Kingston Rovers	September 2011
Tony Martin	Hull F.C.	October 2011
Elliot Kear	Bradford Bulls	October 2011
Gareth Thomas	Retired	October 2011
