= Engage Mutual Charity Man of the Match Award =

The Engage Mutual Charity Man of the Match Award was a scheme by which players judged man-of-the-match for games of the 2011 Super League season nominated charities to whom donations were made.

The Super League is top level professional rugby league club competition for clubs in Europe, as of 2019. The 2011 Super League season (known as the Engage Super League XVI for sponsorship reasons) was the sixteenth season of rugby league football since the Super League format was introduced in 1996. In 2011 the league had fourteen teams: thirteen from England and one from France. In partnership with Sky Sports, Engage Mutual Assurance - title sponsor of the Super League - donated £100 to the Steve Prescott Foundation and £100 to a charity nominated by the Man of the Match, at all live televised Super League games. Over the full season, donations to a variety of charitable causes totaled over £12,000.

== 2011 Winners of the Engage Mutual Man of The Match Award ==
- 14 May Huddersfield v St Helens
  - Danny Brough (Huddersfield) - donated to Brennan Rooney Fund
- 13 May Warrington v Castleford
  - Matt King (Warrington) - donated to Paul Darbyshire Foundation
- 30 April Harlequins v Salford
  - Matty Smith (Salford) - donated to Broadgreen Hospital Cardiac Unit
- 29 April Castleford v Leeds
  - Carl Ablett (Leeds) - donated to Laura Crane Trust
- 25 April - Catalans v Bradford
  - Ian Henderson (Catalans) - donated to Leukaemia Foundation UK
- 22 April - Hull FC v Hull KR
  - Tom Briscoe (Hull FC) - donated to The Steve Prescott Foundation
- 22 April - Wigan v St Helens
  - Pat Richards (Wigan) - donated to Wigan Warriors Foundation
- 21 April - Bradford v Leeds
  - Rob Burrow (Leeds) - donated to RTS Suffers
- 16 April - Salford v Bradford
  - Ashley Gibson (Salford) - donated to Salford's Children Hospital
- 15 April - St Helens v Wakefield
  - Jonny Lomax (St Helens)- donated to TRU Rehab (Brain Damage Charity)
- 9 April - Hull KR v Leeds
  - Ben Galea (Hull KR) - donated to Women and Children's Hospital - Hull
- 8 April - Huddersfield v Warrington
  - Danny Brough (Huddersfield) - donated to Brennan Rooney Fund
- 2 April - Salford v Crusaders
  - Gareth Thomas (Crusaders) - donated to Candlelighters
- 1 April - Leeds v Wigan
  - Danny Buderus (Leeds) - donated to Japanese Tsunami Appeal
- 26 March Hull KR v Huddersfield
  - Jermaine McGillvary (Huddersfield) - donated to RiasRainbow.com
- 25 March Wigan v Warrington
  - Ben Westwood (Warrington) - donated to Warrington Maternity Unit's Baby Bereavement Suite
- 19 March Leeds v St Helens
  - Jamie Foster (St Helens) - donated to Japanese Earthquake Appeal
- 18 March Huddersfield v Wigan
  - Josh Charnley (Wigan) - donated to Japanese Earthquake Appeal
- 12 March Castleford v Catalan
  - Craig Huby (Castleford) - donated to NZ & Queensland Disaster Fund
- 11 March Wakefield v Warrington
  - Ben Harrison (Warrington) - donated to Warrington Wolves Charitable Foundation
- 5 March Warrington v Leeds
  - Rhys Evans (Warrington) - donated to Warrington Wolves Charitable Foundation
- 4 March Harlequins v Huddersfield
  - Shaun Lunt (Huddersfield) - donated to Help the Heroes
- 26 February Crusaders v Bradford
  - Brett Kearney (Bradford) - donated to Breast Cancer Research
- 25 February St Helens v Warrington
  - Gareth Carvell (Warrington) - donated to National Deaf Children's Society
- 19 February Castleford v Huddersfield
  - Rangi Chase (Castleford)- donated to Prince of Wales Hospice, Pontefract
- 18 February Hull FC v Leeds
  - Rob Burrow (Leeds) - donated to Prince of Wales Hospice, Pontefract
