= List of players with 1,000 Super League points =

As of: 3 October 2026. Last game: Warrington Wolves vs Wakefield Trinity, 3 October 2026

Key

- **Bold** shows players still playing in the Super League.
- Italics shows players still playing rugby league but not playing in Super League
- Statistics will include Super League, playoffs, and Super 8's only.

List of rugby league players with 1,000 or more Super League points
Rank	Player	Super League club(s)	Years	Points
1	(England) Kevin Sinfield	Leeds	1997–2015	3,443
2	(Scotland) (England) Danny Brough	Hull F.C., Huddersfield, Wakefield	2005–2006, 2008–2020	2,462
3	(England) Paul Deacon	Oldham, Bradford, Wigan	1997–2011	2,415
4	(England) Marc Sneyd	Salford, Castleford, Hull F.C., Warrington	2010–2026	2,396
5	(England) Andy Farrell	Wigan	1996–2004	2,376
6	(Ireland) Pat Richards	Wigan, Catalans	2006–2013, 2016	2,280
7	(England) Danny Tickle	Halifax, Wigan, Hull F.C., Widnes, Castleford, Leigh, Hull KR	2000–2018	2,267
8	(Wales) Lee Briers	St. Helens, Warrington	1996–2013	2,240
9	(England) Sean Long	Wigan, St. Helens, Hull F.C.	1996–2011	2,202
10	(England) Stefan Ratchford	Salford, Warrington	2007, 2009–2025	1,696
11	(Wales) Iestyn Harris	Warrington, Leeds, Bradford	1996–2001, 2004–2008	1,678
12	(Australia) Michael Dobson	Catalans, Wigan, Hull KR, Salford	2006, 2009–2013, 2015–2017	1,645
13	(England) Luke Gale	London, Bradford, Castleford, Leeds, Hull F.C., Wakefield	2009–2023	1,620
14	(England) Tommy Makinson	St Helens, Catalans	2011–2026	1,353
15	(England) Paul Sykes	Bradford, London, Wakefield,	1999–2014	1,290
16	(England) **Josh Charnley**	Hull KR, Wigan, Warrington, **Leigh**	2010–2016, 2018–present	1,278
17	(England) Danny Orr	Castleford, Wigan, London	1997–2012	1,257
18	(New Zealand) Henry Paul	Wigan, Bradford, London	1996–2001, 2006–2008	1,240
19	(Papua New Guinea) Rhyse Martin	Leeds, Hull KR	2019–2026	1,224
20	(England) Mark Percival	St Helens	2013–2026	1,220
21	(England) Sam Tomkins	Wigan, Catalans	2009–2013, 2016–2025	1,218
22	(France) Thomas Bosc	Catalans	2006–2017	1,166
23	(England) **Zak Hardaker**	Leeds, Castleford, Wigan, Leigh, Hull F.C., **York**	2011–2017, 2019–present	1,155
24	(England) Paul Sculthorpe	Warrington, St. Helens	1996–2008	1,119
25	(England) Steve McNamara	Bradford, Wakefield, Huddersfield	1996–2001, 2003	1,112
26	(England) Ryan Hall	Leeds, Hull KR	2007–2018, 2021–2026	1,096
27	(England) Paul Cooke	Hull FC, Hull KR, Wakefield	1999–2014	1,064
28	(England) Chris Thorman	Sheffield, Huddersfield, London, Hull F.C.	1999–2003, 2005–2009	1,063
29	(Australia) Brett Hodgson	Huddersfield, Warrington	2009–2013	1,051
30	(England) **Jake Connor**	Huddersfield, Hull F.C., **Leeds**	2013-present	1,023
Source: Rugby League Project (1908–2025)

== See also ==
- List of Super League players with 100 or more tries
