= 2009–2011 Super League licences =

2009–2011 Super League Licensing
- Duration: 3 Years

Licence
- Awarded to: Celtic Crusaders; Salford City Reds

The 2009–11 Super League licences were announced in May 2005 by the Rugby Football League (RFL) as the new determinant of the Super League competition's participants from 2009 in place of promotion and relegation. The licences were awarded after consideration of more factors than just the on-the-field performance of a club in the previous season. After 2007 automatic promotion and relegation was suspended for Super League with new teams admitted on a licence basis with the term of the licence to start in 2009.

The RFL stated that clubs applying to compete in Super League XIV in 2009 would be assessed by criteria in four areas (stadium facilities, finance and business performance, commercial and marketing and playing strength, including junior production and development) with the final evaluations and decisions being taken by the RFL's board of directors. These final deliberations were informed by the findings of a range of experts at the RFL and from external advisors such as KPMG.

Successful applicants would be licensed for three years of Super League competition. Three-yearly reviews of Super League membership will take place to ensure ambitious clubs lower down the leagues can still be successful.

== Motivation ==
The RFL's in-house lawyer, Rod Findlay, explained, "The basis for the licensing process was established in May 2005 when the RFL, in full consultation with member clubs, drew up a strategy document for Super League which basically said 'This is what we want the league to look like and this is what we want the clubs to look like,'". Findlay continued, "The document concluded that the competition should be expanded to 14 clubs and said it was not felt the heartland would be able to sustain that number of Super League clubs. We do not have 14 clubs who satisfy all the Super League strategy aims. The board needs to decide whether those clubs that are not currently satisfying the aims can satisfy them in the future."

Commenting on the implementation of three-year licence cycles, the RFL's chief executive Nigel Wood stated, "We hope to capture all of the advantages of a closed competition like the NRL without the disadvantages of having perennial under-performers that sometimes you get in a closed competition."

=== Club development ===
It is thought that the removal of the annual threat of relegation will prompt clubs to invest in developing their infrastructure, such as junior development and facilities, rather than spending on short-term fixes to avoid the drop. "The aim is that clubs direct some of their resources into medium-term development rather than the short-term panic of trying to hire a player, invariably from overseas, who will make the difference against relegation but leave without any long-term legacy," said the RFL's Wood.

The RFL have stated their belief that the benefits of licensing would grow the collective business strength of Super League (Europe) Limited. Alex Byars, senior manager in the Sports Business Group at Deloitte believed that licensing system had the potential to bring more money into the sport: "The greater stability could lead to more investment from outside of the sport as the removal of dramatic revenue changes due to relegation could also increase investor confidence."

=== International competition ===
Richard Lewis said he expected that "licensing will galvanise the sport, stimulating clubs into addressing the issues of facility improvements, spectator comfort and the production of more players".

The changes brought forth by licensing are intended to strengthen the competition and British rugby league. The strengthened competition, it is hoped, will lead to the development of more players able to compete successfully at international level. "The thinking is that if we have a more intense competition we will produce battle-hardened footballers," said Wood.

=== Expansion to 14 clubs ===
The RFL have said that there is no upper limit on the number of clubs that may be accepted into the competition if more than fourteen strong applications are received as long as any additional entrants are "not detrimental to the overall quality of the competition and depth of playing talent".

In June 2008, the RFL confirmed that Super League would be expanded from 12 teams to 14 in 2009. Richard Lewis, the RFL's executive chairman, said it was "as good a time as any for the sport to go to a 14-team Super League competition" with "television income, sponsorship income and crowd figures - so much going well" and the international game growing. Expansion to 14 teams had been an aim of the RFL and its member clubs since the licensing was agreed upon in a 2005 strategy document.

== Applicants ==
Nineteen applications for Super League licences were received. Each of the 2008 season Super League clubs applied as well as several National League One sides and Toulouse Olympique of the French Elite One Championship.

In recent seasons and leading up to the submission deadline, several clubs submitted 'dummy' applications to the RFL - on which they received advice and feedback - in preparation for their official one. This 'dummy' application facility run by the RFL has been praised by clubs including Castleford and its chief executive, Richard Wright.

The applicants were:

Applicants
Club	Location	Stadium	Capacity*	League
Bradford Bulls	Bradford, West Yorkshire	Odsal Stadium	27,000	Super League
Castleford Tigers	Castleford, West Yorkshire	Wheldon Road	12,000	Super League
Catalans Dragons	Perpignan, France		13,000	Super League
Celtic Crusaders	Wrexham, Wales	Racecourse Ground	15,000	Super League
Featherstone Rovers	Featherstone, West Yorkshire	Post Office Road	9,850	National League 1
Halifax	Halifax, West Yorkshire	The Shay	15,000	National League 1
Harlequins	Twickenham, London	Twickenham Stoop	14,000	Super League
Hull F.C.	Hull, East Yorkshire	KC Stadium	25,000	Super League
Hull Kingston Rovers	Hull, East Yorkshire	Craven Park	12,225	Super League
Huddersfield Giants	Huddersfield, West Yorkshire	Kirklees Stadium	24,000	Super League
Leeds Rhinos	Leeds, West Yorkshire	Headingley Stadium	21,000	Super League
Leigh Centurions	Leigh, Greater Manchester	Leigh Sports Village	12,000	National League 1
Salford City Reds	Salford, Greater Manchester	The Willows	11,363	National League 1
St. Helens	St. Helens, Mersyside	Knowsley Road	17,500	Super League
Toulouse Olympique	Toulouse, France			Elite One
Wakefield Trinity Wildcats	Wakefield, West Yorkshire	Belle Vue	12,000	Super League
Warrington Wolves	Warrington, Cheshire	Halliwell Jones Stadium	15,000	Super League
Widnes Vikings	Widnes, Cheshire	Halton Stadium	13,000	National League 1
Wigan Warriors	Wigan, Greater Manchester	DW Stadium	25,000	Super League

=== Application eligibility ===
Current Super League clubs were required to submit applications justifying their continued membership of the competition.

Non-Super League clubs based in the United Kingdom had to be participants in The Co-operative National League One during the 2008 season to apply.

Clubs based outside the UK and not competing in either Super League or National League One were able to apply, with applications to be judged by "the independent RFL board under the same process as UK based applications".

The deadline for the completed licence applications of clubs was the end of March 2008.

=== Decision process ===
The licence application process was designed to have the confidence of clubs being assessed as to the rigour of analysis of the business plans produced. The RFL and the clubs did not want the process to be a "leap of faith".

The process had three stages:

1. Each applicant clubs was assessed to ensure they met minimum standards for Super League already in force.
2. Using a simple points system, the clubs were divided into one of three categories, A, B or C.
3. A detailed analysis of each club was undertaken examining their structure and business plan. The results of each analysis were detailed in separate reports and submitted to the RFL board for their consideration.

=== Expulsion from Super League ===
Clubs that are awarded a Super League Licence are not protected for the three years of the contract from removal from Super League due to the absence of relegation. The RFL Board will have powers enabling them to revoke a club's membership if necessary at any time, with the failed club being replaced by another from outside. The reasons, yet to be finalised and published, are "likely to include insolvency, contractual breach, persistent under performance and possibly persistent rule breaking".

== Licence criteria ==
Stage two of the licence decision process saw the clubs allocated the points used to decide licence grades according to their strength in several areas.

=== Facilities ===
Teams will get one point for having a stadium with a capacity of 12,000 or more. Another point will be awarded if the ground meets the standards of a premier competition in the 21st century.

=== Attendances ===
A point will be awarded to clubs with an average attendance of around 10,000 spectators. Another point will be awarded if stadiums are operating at 40 per cent capacity.

=== Finances ===
Teams will receive a point if they are solvent. Another point will be awarded if their turnover is more than £4 million.

=== Player strength ===
Teams earn one point if they are considered to have made a contribution to the competition - that means averaging a place in the top eight over each of the last three seasons. Another point is available to clubs who make a contribution to home-grown player development. That means at least eight members of a first-team squad of 25 should be discovered, trained and developed in the team's home country (United Kingdom or France).

=== Salary cap ===
One point is on offer to teams who have not committed a major breach of the salary cap in the last three seasons.

=== Geographical expansion ===
The final point goes to clubs who do not have another rugby league club within a 20-mile radius.

=== Total score ===
The scores attained by each club (out of ten) are translated into a Licence grading.

- 8 or more points - A licence
- 5-7 points - B licence
- 4 points or less - C licence

Sky Sports report that it is believed teams who achieve an A or B Licence will be awarded a place in Super League, while those who achieve a C Licence will undergo further scrutiny before the RFL decide who makes the final cut.

== Results ==
=== Predicted ===
Sky Sports
Boots 'N' All, the magazine programme broadcast on Sky Sports, the primary Super League broadcaster, sent a reporter to each of the nineteen applicants to evaluate them.

Sky Sports Licences
A licence	B licence	C licence
Hull F.C.	Bradford Bulls	Castleford Tigers
Leeds Rhinos	Catalans Dragons	Celtic Crusaders
St. Helens	Harlequins	Featherstone Rovers
Warrington Wolves	Huddersfield Giants	Halifax
	Leigh Centurions	Hull Kingston Rovers
	Salford City Reds	Wakefield Trinity Wildcats
	Toulouse Olympique
Widnes Vikings
Wigan Warriors

Code 13
Monthly British rugby league magazine Code 13 also evaluated all the licences, apart from Toulouse, in their April 2008 issue.

Code Licences
A licence	B licence	C licence
Bradford Bulls 8	Harlequins 7	Castleford Tigers 4
Leeds Rhinos 9	Huddersfield Giants 6	Celtic Crusaders 3
Catalans Dragons 8	St. Helens 6	Featherstone Rovers 2
Warrington Wolves 9	Widnes Vikings 5	Halifax 4
Hull F.C. 8		Hull Kingston Rovers 3
Wigan Warriors 8		Salford City Reds 4
		Leigh Centurions 3
Wakefield Trinity Wildcats 3

=== Outcome ===
The 19 applicant clubs met with the RFL's board of directors at 0945 BST Tuesday 22 July 2008 to be told the outcome of their bids for licences.

The executive chairman of the RFL, Richard Lewis, publicly announced the 14 clubs to be licensed at 1000 BST. The press conference had been described by some as British rugby league's most significant since the switch to a summer Super League was first mooted in 1995. An announcement of this kind was a first for British sport.

The 14 successful clubs included all 12 existing Super League clubs, despite concern that some did not meet the relevant criteria. A day later, on 23 July 2008, the RFL announced the gradings they had given to each of the 14 successful applications.

Super League Licences
A licence	B licence	C licence
Hull F.C.	Bradford Bulls	Castleford Tigers
Leeds Rhinos	St. Helens	Celtic Crusaders †
Warrington Wolves	Wigan Warriors	Catalans Dragons
		Harlequins
Hull Kingston Rovers
Huddersfield Giants
Salford City Reds †
Wakefield Trinity Wildcats

†	Team elevated to Super League

In the lead up to the announcement, Rod Findlay, the RFL's in-house lawyer, stated that he believed the process of preparing the applications would benefit each of the 19 applicants due to the level of scrutiny required for so much of their operation.

=== Summary of applications ===
Following the announcement of which clubs had successfully obtained a licence to compete in Super League, the RFL released a summary of their assessment of each applicant.

Bradford Bulls

The club's stadium, Odsal, was judged to need improvement, although the RFL noted the Coral Stand development provided Bradford with a good standard hospitality provision and that there were plans for further development in the future known as Odsal Sporting Village. The club financial situation was praised for an ability to operate without shareholder support. Match attendances had fallen in comparison to past seasons but the club was still one of the better supported of the applicants. Bradford had a record of recent success in competition; this was tempered by what was considered a "slight overseas reliance" in the playing department.

Catalans Dragons

The Catalans' home ground, Stade Gilbert Brutus in Perpignan, was considered to be a "sound functional stadium" with further development planned for the year ahead. The RFL found the club's financial forecasts to be of a lower standard than preferred and also that the club had been "reliant on shareholder input". Attendances and merchandising at the club were judged to have improved, as expected, over the three years since the Catalans' entry to Super League, from a low starting point. It was noted that the team were achieving positive match results and that more French trained players had been introduced, but that club needed to improve its youth development programme. The RFL felt that the commercial success of the club and an increased player pool proved a vindication of the decision to introduce a French team to the competition.

Castleford Tigers

Castleford's Wheldon Road ground, The Jungle, was deemed to be "limited and old fashioned" though well maintained. The club had noted the standard of the ground and possessed "relatively advanced" plans to build a new stadium. The financial projections submitted by the club were based on a new ground. The RFL believed the club to be financially well managed and for use of external borrowing and shareholder funds to be "limited". Castleford had produced a "holistic" commercial plan, having a record of achievement in this area, and had enjoyed strong support previously when the club had been relegated from Super League. Relegation, though, had had a detrimental effect on the club's playing staff, despite the club maintaining youth pathways, it had not been able to sign the best of the local rugby league prospects.

Celtic Crusaders

The club's Brewery Field home ground was considered to be "limited and old fashioned" though well maintained and there was a commitment to improve the facilities immediately. Celtic Crusaders acknowledged the necessity to develop a new facility in the future. The RFL considered the club's financial projections to be subjective as a consequence of the enterprise being a new venture but noted that the club had shown stability financially since formation. The RFL noted positive relationships had been developed between the club and commercial partners and that there were opportunities to be exploited through a relationship with Welsh language television channel S4C. The RFL noted that independent market research had found support for Super League in South Wales, but acknowledged that only reality would provide full testing. The club has scholarship and academy team development at an early stage but the RFL noted playing infrastructure was "very good in places".

Featherstone Rovers

The Chris Moyles Stadium in Post Office Road was assessed as being well maintained but in need of further investment to meet Super League minimum standards. The club was judged to have good community initiatives and to have generated some positive and creative media coverage in the previous year. The club was proximate to several current Super League clubs and so faced competition. Featherstone's player development pathway was below the standard needed for Super League and would require investment. The club's finances appeared to be stable.

Halifax

It was felt that the incomplete state of The Shay stadium "significantly restrained" the club and their application because it made financial and marketing plans quite hypothetical, though the past positive contribution to Super League of the Halifax club was noted. The RFL also noted that Halifax had consistently performed at the higher end of National League 1 in recent campaigns. It was stated that player development investment would need to be increased to reach Super League standard.

Harlequins RL

Harlequins' home ground, The Stoop, had all-round good facilities and it is hoped stability at this stadium will lead to an increase in attendance as the club attempts to attract the population within their "catchment area" and utilise a "robust" community programme. The club relied on "significant" shareholder support. The club had been "reasonably successful" in Super League and there were local players emerging through player development schemes but the club's junior players are "not regularly attracting national honours".

Huddersfield Giants

Huddersfield's home ground was deemed to be "excellent", though not quite state-of-the-art owing to its opening in 1994. Huddersfield were judged to be dependent on the support of its shareholders and to need to meet the aims of its commercial planning to negate this. Attendance at matches has risen, this was attributed to improved on-field performance as well as the recruitment of commercial staff. The club's talent development structures for scholarship and academy players was noted an area that needed close monitoring by the club so that they could meet quotas for club-trained players.

Hull

Hull were commended for their "excellent stadium" and attendances. The club were deemed to be well-run and to have good community programmes. Hull showed that they were operating in profit and required little external financial funds. Playing strength was high.

Hull Kingston Rovers

Rovers were said to have strong potential. The club had invested in improving their facilities, with further improvements planned. The club's commercial plans and community work were praised. The assessors considered that further evidence of player performance strategies would have been useful but that this area had improved since the club was promoted to Super League.

Leeds Rhinos

Leeds Rhinos' Headingley Stadium was noted to be an older stadium but one that had undergone "significant improvements" with additional ones planned. The Leeds club had historic and projected profits in addition to "strong" net assets. The clubs was praised for good performance commercially, in match attendances, playing record and in producing quality Club Trained players.

Leigh Centurions

Leigh's new stadium at Leigh Sports Village was close to opening and through inspection of the site and a review of plans, the facility was predicted to be "excellent". The assessment team believed the stadium would aid the club in developing its structures and in developing into a strong candidate for Super League. It was judged that Leigh would need to recruit to be able to deliver their "good, reasoned" commercial plan. Leigh was predicted to be reliant on its shareholders. The club had shown evidence of investment in youth production, though this was judged to need improvement to achieve Super League standards.

Salford City Reds

The club's ground, The Willows, was assessed to be "limited and old fashioned" despite having good corporate and disabled facilities. The assessment noted "relatively advanced" plans for a replacement. Salford had long record of financial stability and their commercial and marketing plans "appear[ed] well developed" with intentions to exploit their planned stadium and access to Salford and Manchester. The club was judged to have been "very diligent in every area" of their player performance strategy although problems with under 16s player development were noted.

St Helens

The club's Knowsley Road ground was described as "old and tired" and as causing the financial position and commercial activities of the club to be "constrained". It was noted that planning permission had recently been secured for a new stadium. The club's financial plans were based around this new stadium. St Helens had a strong playing infrastructure and were market leaders in junior production.

Toulouse Olympique

The acceptance of Toulouse would have meant geographic expansion. The club was considered to have a "commendable commitment" to the production of new players but there was a concern regarding limited numbers of Super League standard talent in the area. Toulouse's financial projections were thought to require hard work to achieve. Toulouse's application included a plan to use two "quality facilities" while redeveloping their own ground.

Wakefield Trinity Wildcats

Wakefield's ground, Belle Vue, was considered to be "limited and old fashioned". The club had plans for a new stadium that they predicted to occupy by 2010. The club was acknowledged to have made an improvement in on-field performance, increased investment in the playing department, made progress with community development, improved attendances and also to have youth development working "reasonably well".

Warrington Wolves

Warrington play in a "quality new stadium", the Halliwell Jones Stadium, which is "excellent" in all but "one or two aspects". Warrington had plans to improve their ground further. The club's financial projections were considered challenging but it was noted that the club had performed well in that area in the past and had a good commercial plan. Warrington was judged to perform well on the field after investment in its playing infrastructure. It was noted that the next step for Warrington was to begin to contest finals and semi-finals as well as to produce Club Trained international.

Widnes Vikings

The Vikings' Stobart Stadium Halton ground was considered a good size and well-appointed following investment. The club's application suffered from its recent financial history, insolvency in October 2007, and the new company not being established long despite showing early progress. The National League club had a "reasonable" playing department, though further investment to achieve competitiveness in Super league and to meet Club Trained rules would be needed.

Wigan Warriors

Wigan's stadium was considered "excellent" with the club attracting good attendances. Strong commercial plans and being a market leader in some areas were positive, though some reliance on the new majority shareholder detracted from this. The club had an excellent playing infrastructure and expressed a commitment to turning more juniors into first team players.

== Response to announcement ==
=== Club representatives ===
Castleford Tigers

- Richard Wright, chief executive - "This is fabulous news for the club and the fans and just what we have been waiting to hear."

Celtic Crusaders

- Jonathan Davies, Club President - "This gives the Welsh public the opportunity to see top-class rugby league in Wales on a week-by-week basis. We missed the boat in both 1995 and 1998...but this decision more than makes up for it. Now, more of an infrastructure is in place with teams at all levels in Wales from schoolboys upwards, which wasn't the case 10 years ago.I'd like to thank the RFL for giving us the opportunity and roll on 2009."
- David Thompson, chief executive - "We are absolutely delighted. What we have achieved over two-and-a-half years is incredible, but we know all we have done is get to the starting line. We have got a lot of work to do over the next three years to make sure we continue to grow and become stronger."

Leigh Centurions

- Allan Rowley, chief executive - "May we take this opportunity to wish Salford and Celtic all the best but we also have to say we are thoroughly disgusted with the Celtic decision. We now have a team that fielded 10 overseas players against us because they are classed as a development team and are now in our elite competition, which is a complete contradiction of terms and we feel this decision is purely a geographical one...the decision makers should hang their heads in shame."

Salford City Reds

- David Tarry, chief executive - "We are the regional club for Manchester. The future is bright and exciting and we are now in a position to really be a flagship for rugby league and to rival the success enjoyed by Sale Sharks."
- Paul Snape, finance director - "For the first time ever we can plan properly without the threat of relegation. We can invest our revenues and our sponsorship. We are in the big league. The club has traditionally been loss making but when we get to the new stadium it will be profitable."

Warrington Wolves

- Dave Hutchinson, commercial director - Believes clubs further work is needed to attract even bigger sponsors: "A lot of sponsors do not realise how popular it is. They see it as having a cloth cap image. That is not the reality. For example 40 per cent who watch it are ABC1s. Super League has attracted some big sponsors and we need to up the ante."

Widnes Vikings

- Steve O'Connor, Chairman - "We must build on the solid foundations we have laid down over the past eight months and plan for the future. I feel it is vital for the game as a whole that the Super League flourishes under this new licence system and I'm still convinced that Widnes Vikings have all the credentials to become a powerful force in Super League."

=== Wider game and media response ===
Ray French - Former player, broadcaster - "Widnes, unlike Leigh, reacted with dignity and integrity and a determination to make it in 2011. They were arguably the biggest losers in all this, but the way they reacted was the right thing to do, as was awarding a franchise to the Crusaders. The game can no longer just exist in the north of England, it has to go national and international.It is growing in France and it is also growing in Scotland and Ireland, both places where I wouldn't be surprised to see Super League bids come from next time around."

Brian Moore - Rugby union broadcaster and journalist - "The criteria upon which it is said the awards were made were multifarious, allowing, depending on your point of view, detailed scrutiny of every aspect of each applicant's case; or to allow the Rugby Football League to justify any award it wanted to make." "The decision to grant a licence to the Celtic Crusaders of Wales in front of Widnes and Halifax has caused justifiable ill-feeling...this was an expansion decision, pure and simple; pretending otherwise is insulting to those who missed out and wasted time and money chasing a franchise they were never going to get."

== Monitoring ==
During the three-year licence period clubs will be monitored by the RFL to ensure that they are "progressing with plans they put in their original Super League licence applications," said the RFL's director of development, Gary Tasker.

In July 2009, the RFL wrote to five Super League clubs to remind them of the commitments they made regarding improvement of their stadium facilities under the licensing agreement. Castleford, Celtic Crusaders, Wakefield, St Helens and Salford were warned that their continued presence in Super League after the next round of licensing is in jeopardy. An RFL statement said, "[They] have been informed that if plans to build new stadiums or significantly improve their home venues are not sufficiently advanced by 2011, they may not satisfy the full criteria for the next period of licensing". Gary Tasker warned of "the potential implications any failure to do so may have on their next application. Clubs need to be aware that we are raising the bar for the next licence period."

In 2009, at an end-of-season briefing given by the RFL's executive chairman, Richard Lewis, expressed his disappointment at the attendance figures for Harlequins home games. Lewis contrasted the increases in rugby league participation in London with the lack of reflection of this in the club's crowds. In 2008, the season leading up to the issuance of licences, Harlequin's highest attendance was 4,378 when Leeds Rhinos played the club as reigning champions, Lewis said "they haven't kicked on like we thought they would". Harlequins achieved an average home attendance of just under 3,500 for 2009. The club responded to the concern, stating: "Harlequins have been working very hard with the RFL in all of the areas raised at yesterday's briefing. Together with the RFL the club is developing its strategy for fixtures and the community game, amongst other key areas, with the aim of increasing attendances". Paul Blanchard, the Harlequins chief executive, said: "Richard's comments did not come as a surprise to me - in fact I have had this conversation with the RFL before. It makes a good headline for the papers but it is nothing we were not aware of. The comments were actually part of an overview of the season as a whole, and both ourselves and Crusaders were talked about in terms of attendance. We know it is something we have to improve".

== The future: 2012–14 licences ==
Unsuccessful applicant clubs and others will be able to apply for the next set of licences for the three-year period 2012–2014 in 2011. To be eligible they must qualify for the Grand Final of the division below Super League, the Co-operative Championship, in 2009 or 2010 or win the National League Cup.

RFL Chief Executive Nigel Wood sought to allay fears that Super League could become a 'closed shop' in the absence of relegation. Despite the length of the licences being three years, that does not mean that clubs with a licence are assured of remaining in Super League for the full three years of their agreement. "This is not a closed shop", "there must always be a way of getting in and a way of removing under-performing clubs" said Wood.

Mr Wood also said that following the three years, there could be further changes. "The best performing [Championship] club will be guaranteed admission to Super League, either at the expense of the worst performing club or by expanding the competition," he said.

No upper limit on the number of Super League licences awarded has been set by the RFL, the option remains open to expand again in the future. Increasing the number of teams in the competition without changing the competition's format would be at odds with recent RFL and Super League decisions and reports. The RFL's plan for international success, which was the result of an inquiry into England's poor performance at the 2008 World Cup, states an intention to work with clubs to limit the number of games top players can take part in. The Magic Weekend event has allowed for a reduction in the number of games each club plays to 27, from 28; although a reason for the desire to reduce games in this case was to reduce the number of times Super League sides played each other more than twice in the regular season.
