= 2011 Super League season =

British rugby league season

Super League XVI
- League: Super League
- Duration: 27 Rounds
- Teams: 14
- Highest attendance: 24,057; Wigan Warriors vs St Helens (22 April)
- Lowest attendance: 1,766; Harlequins vs Celtic Crusaders (20 February)
- Average attendance: 9,615
- Total attendance: 990,439
- Broadcast partners: Sky Sports; Nine Network; Orange Sport; America One; Sport Klub

2011 season
- Champions: Leeds Rhinos; 5th Super League title 8th British title
- League Leaders: Warrington Wolves
- Runners-up: St. Helens
- Man of Steel: (New Zealand) Rangi Chase
- Top point-scorer: (England) Jamie Foster (330)
- Top try-scorer: (England) Ryan Hall (28)

Licences
- Licence awarded to: Widnes Vikings
- Licence removed from: Crusaders

The Engage Super League XVI was the official name for the 2011 Super League season. Fourteen teams competed over 27 rounds, after which the highest finishing teams entered the play-offs to compete for a place in the Grand Final and a chance to win the championship and the Super League Trophy. Leeds Rhinos claimed their fifth Super League crown, tying the record previously held by St. Helens, whilst the Warrington Wolves lifted the League Leaders' Shield.

The season kicked off on 12 February with the Annual "Millennium Magic Weekend", which was brought forward from its usual slot in May.

The 2011 season included the introduction of the Rugby League International Origin Match, wherein the England national rugby league team played the RL Exiles, an outfit made up of Australians and New Zealanders playing for Super League clubs. This contest is intended to henceforth become an annual fixture to replace the previously existing annual test against the France national rugby league team, due to the onesidedness of such contests in recent years.

== Teams ==
Super League XVI was the third year of a licensed Super League. Under this system, promotion and relegation between Super League and Championship was abolished, and 14 teams were granted licences subject to certain criteria. All twelve teams from Super League XIII were given places, as well as former Super League team Salford City Reds and Crusaders. This was the final year of the initial licensing cycle; a new set of licences would be awarded for 2012–14.

Geographically, the vast majority of teams in Super League are based in the north of England, four teams – Warrington, St. Helens, Salford and Wigan – to the west of the Pennines in Cheshire, Greater Manchester and Merseyside, and seven teams to the east in Yorkshire – Huddersfield, Bradford, Wakefield Trinity, Leeds, Castleford, Hull F.C. and Hull Kingston Rovers. Catalans Dragons are the only team based in France and are outside of the UK, Crusaders are the only team in Wales, and Harlequins are the only team to be based in a capital city (London).

Team	Stadium	Capacity	City/Area
Bradford Bulls (2011 season)	Grattan Stadium, Odsal	27,000	Bradford, West Yorkshire
Castleford Tigers (2011 season)	The Jungle	11,750	Castleford, West Yorkshire
Catalans Dragons (2011 season)	Stade Gilbert Brutus	10,000	Perpignan, Pyrénées-Orientales, France
Crusaders Rugby League (2011 season)	The Racecourse Ground	15,000	Wrexham, Clwyd, Wales
Harlequins (2011 season)	Twickenham Stoop	12,700	Twickenham, London
Huddersfield Giants (2011 season)	Galpharm Stadium	24,544	Huddersfield, West Yorkshire
Hull F.C. (2011 season)	Kingston Communications Stadium	25,404	Kingston upon Hull, East Riding of Yorkshire
Hull Kingston Rovers (2011 season)	"New" Craven Park	9,471	Kingston upon Hull, East Riding of Yorkshire
Leeds Rhinos (2011 season)	Headingley Carnegie Stadium	22,250	Leeds, West Yorkshire
Salford City Reds (2011 season)	Salford City Stadium	12,000	Salford, Greater Manchester
St Helens R.F.C. (2011 season)	Halton Stadium	13,350	Widnes, Halton
Wakefield Trinity Wildcats (2011 season)	Belle Vue	12,600	Wakefield, West Yorkshire
Warrington Wolves (2011 season)	Halliwell Jones Stadium	14,206	Warrington, Cheshire
Wigan Warriors (2011 season)	DW Stadium	25,138	Wigan, Greater Manchester

Legend
Reigning Super League champions
Defending Challenge Cup Champions

The maps below indicate the locations of teams that competed in Super League XVI.

== Rules ==
=== Rule changes ===
- A new stricter variation on the ruck and holding down was introduced in 2011. When the referee calls "held" and "move", the tackle is deemed to be completed, and any further infringement from that point on in the ruck is penalised.

=== Operational rules ===
- All Super League clubs agreed to operate within the £1.7million salary cap for their top 25 first-tier players.
- Quota spots were reduced to 5, meaning only 5 players could be from abroad. However, players from France, Samoa, Tonga and Papua New Guinea all count as federation-trained and thus do not count against the quota.

== Table ==
Pos	Team	Pld	W	D	L	PF	PA	PD	Pts	Qualification
1	Warrington Wolves (L)	27	22	0	5	1072	401	+671	44	Play-offs
2	Wigan Warriors	27	20	3	4	852	432	+420	43	Play-offs
3	St Helens	27	17	3	7	782	515	+267	37	Play-offs
4	Huddersfield Giants	27	16	0	11	707	524	+183	32	Play-offs
5	Leeds Rhinos (C)	27	15	1	11	757	603	+154	31	Play-offs
6	Catalans Dragons	27	15	1	11	689	626	+63	31	Play-offs
7	Hull Kingston Rovers	27	14	0	13	713	692	+21	28	Play-offs
8	Hull F.C.	27	13	1	13	718	569	+149	27	Play-offs
9	Castleford Tigers	27	12	2	13	664	808	−144	26	
10	Bradford Bulls	27	9	2	16	570	826	−256	20	
11	Salford City Reds	27	10	0	17	542	809	−267	20	
12	Harlequins	27	6	1	20	524	951	−427	13	
13	Wakefield Trinity Wildcats	27	7	0	20	453	957	−504	10 (Note: Wakefield deducted 4 points for entering administration.)	
14	Crusaders	27	6	0	21	527	857	−330	8 (Note: Crusaders deducted 4 points for entering administration.)	

Source: rugbyleagueproject.org
Rules for classification: 1) Points; 2) Points difference; 3) Number of points scored;
(C) Champions; (L) League Leaders' Shield winners

== Play-offs ==
The play-offs commenced following the conclusion of the 27-round regular season. To decide the grand finalists from the top eight finishing teams, Super League uses its unique play-off system. The finals concluded with the 2011 Super League Grand Final.

Home	Score	Away	Match Information
Home	Score	Away	Date and Time (Local)	Venue	Referee	Crowd
QUALIFYING AND ELIMINATION FINALS
Warrington Wolves	47 – 0	Huddersfield Giants	16 September 2011, 20:00	Halliwell Jones Stadium	Steve Ganson	10,006
Catalans Dragons	56 - 6	Hull Kingston Rovers	17 September 2011, 19:45	Stade Gilbert Brutus	James Child	8,413
Leeds Rhinos	42 – 10	Hull F.C.	18 September 2011, 17:15	Headingley Stadium	Ben Thaler	9,075
Wigan Warriors	18 - 26	St. Helens	18 September 2011, 14:45	DW Stadium	Phil Bentham	12,893
PRELIMINARY SEMI-FINALS
Huddersfield Giants	28 – 34	Leeds Rhinos	23 September 2011, 20:00	Galpharm Stadium	Phil Bentham	7,872
Wigan Warriors	44 – 0	Catalans Dragons	25 September 2011, 17:00	DW Stadium	Steve Ganson	6,790
SEMI-FINALS
Warrington Wolves	24 – 26	Leeds Rhinos	30 September 2011, 20:00	Halliwell Jones Stadium	Steve Ganson	12,074
St. Helens	26 - 18	Wigan Warriors	1 October 2011, 18:00	Stobart Stadium	Phil Bentham	9.421
GRAND FINAL
Leeds Rhinos	32 – 16	St. Helens	8 October 2011, 18:00	Old Trafford, Manchester	Phil Bentham	69,107

2011 Super League play-offs bracket

Qualifying/Elimination playoffs
1	Warrington Wolves	47
4	Huddersfield Giants	0
5	Leeds Rhinos	42
8	Hull	10
6	Catalans Dragons	56
7	Hull KR	6
2	Wigan Warriors	18
3	St. Helens	26

Preliminary semifinals
Huddersfield Giants	28
Leeds Rhinos	34
Catalans Dragons	0
Wigan Warriors	44

Qualifying semifinals
Warrington selected Leeds
Warrington Wolves	24
Leeds Rhinos	26
St Helens	26
Wigan Warriors	18

Grand Final
8 October, Old Trafford
Leeds Rhinos	32
St Helens	16

Week 1. Qualifying/Elimination play-offs: Fixtures decided by regular reason finishing positions. Higher ranked teams play lower ranked teams. Higher ranked teams receive home ground advantage.
Week 2. Preliminary semi-finals: Fixtures decided by regular season finishing positions. Higher ranked teams play lower ranked teams. Higher ranked teams receive home ground advantage.
Week 3. Qualifying semi-finals: Winners of Qualifying play-offs play winners of Qualifying semi-finals. Fixtures decided by club call. Winners of Qualifying play-offs receive home ground advantage.

== Statistics ==
The following are the top points scorers in the Super League during the 2011 season. Statistics also include tries and goals scored in the play-offs.

Most tries

Player	Team	Tries
Ryan Hall	Leeds Rhinos	28
Sam Tomkins	Wigan Warriors	28
Joel Monaghan	Warrington Wolves	26
Kris Welham	Hull Kingston Rovers	24
Josh Charnley	Wigan Warriors	23
Ryan Atkins	Warrington Wolves	22
Kirk Yeaman	Hull F.C.	21
Jamie Foster	St. Helens	21
Pat Richards	Wigan Warriors	21
Damien Blanch	Catalans Dragons	20

Most goals

Player	Team	Goals
Kevin Sinfield	Leeds Rhinos	138
Jamie Foster	St. Helens	123
Brett Hodgson	Warrington Wolves	121
Pat Richards	Wigan Warriors	115
Scott Dureau	Catalans Dragons	92
Patrick Ah Van	Bradford Bulls	87
Kirk Dixon	Castleford Tigers	84
Danny Tickle	Hull F.C.	83
Danny Brough	Huddersfield Giants	82
Michael Dobson	Hull Kingston Rovers	76

Most points

Player	Team	Tries	Goals	DGs	Points
Jamie Foster	St. Helens	21	123	0	330
Brett Hodgson	Warrington Wolves	18	121	0	314
Pat Richards	Wigan Warriors	21	115	0	314
Kevin Sinfield	Leeds Rhinos	2	138	2	286
Scott Dureau	Catalans Dragons	11	92	5	233
Patrick Ah Van	Bradford Bulls	9	87	0	210
Danny Tickle	Hull F.C.	9	83	0	202
Danny Brough	Huddersfield Giants	8	82	1	197
Kirk Dixon	Castleford Tigers	7	84	0	196
Luke Gale	Harlequins	8	75	2	184

== Awards ==
Awards were presented for outstanding contributions and efforts to players and clubs:

- Man of Steel: Rangi Chase
- Coach of the year: Trent Robinson
- Engage Super League club of the year: Catalan Dragons
- Young player of the year: Jonny Lomax
- Carnegie community player of the year: Lee Radford
- Frontline Fairplay Index winners: Hull F.C.
- Metre-maker: James Roby
- Hit Man: Danny Houghton
- Mike Gregory Spirit of Rugby League Award: Steve Prescott

This season the Engage Mutual Charity Man of the Match Award scheme was undertaken as well.

== Media ==
=== Television ===
2011 was the last year of a three-year broadcasting agreement between the RFL and BSkyB for Sky Sports to screen matches exclusively live within the United Kingdom. The deal for the 2009, 2010 and 2011 season was worth in excess of £50 million.

Sky Sports continued coverage in the UK that saw two live matches broadcast each week – one on Friday night at 7:30 pm and another usually on Saturday evenings. Regular commentators were Eddie Hemmings and Mike Stephenson with summarisers including Phil Clarke, Barrie McDermott and Terry O'Connor. Highlights were shown on Boots N' All, shown on Sky Sports and rebroadcast on the Internet.

BBC Sport broadcast a highlights programme called the Super League Show, usually presented by Harry Gration. The BBC elected to broadcast this only to the North West, Yorkshire & North Midlands, North East & Cumbria, and East Yorkshire & Lincolnshire regions on a Sunday. A national repeat was broadcast overnight during the week; the BBC Director of Sport, Richard Moseley, commented that this move was in response to the growing popularity and awareness of the sport, and the large number of requests from people who want to watch it elsewhere in the UK. End of season play-offs are shown across the whole country in a highlights package. Super League Show is available for streaming or downloaded using the BBC iPlayer in the UK.

Orange Sport TV in France aired every Catalans Dragons home match either live or via tape delay.

Internationally Super League is shown live on Showtime Sports (Middle East), Sky Sport (New Zealand), NTV+ (Russia), SportKlub (Eastern Europe).

2011 was also the last of a three-year deal in which the Nine Network in Australia showed up to 70 live games from Super League over the life of the contract.

=== Radio ===
BBC Coverage:

- BBC Radio 5 Live Sports Extra (National DAB Digital Radio) normally carry one Super League commentary a week on Friday Nights.
- BBC Manchester will carry commentary of Wigan and Salford whilst sharing commentary of Warrington with BBC Merseyside.
- BBC Humberside will have full match commentary of all Hull KR and Hull matches.
- BBC Leeds carry commentaries featuring Bradford, Leeds, Castleford, Wakefield and Huddersfield.
- BBC Merseyside (AM/DAB only) will have commentary on every St Helens match whilst sharing commentary of Warrington with BBC Manchester.
- BBC London 94.9 airs all Harlequins games home & away, mainly via online streaming only.

Commercial Radio Coverage:

- Wish FM will carry commentaries of Wigan & St Helens matches.
- Wire FM will do full match commentary on Warrington Home & Away.
- BCB 106.6 (Bradford Community Broadcasting) have full match commentary of Bradford Bulls home and away.
- Yorkshire Radio increases its coverage to air 50 games in the 2011 season.
- Radio Warrington (Online Station) all Warrington home games and some away games.
- Radio Marseillette covers every Catalans Dragons Home Match (in French).
- Radio France Bleu Roussillon covers every Catalans Dragons Away Match (in French).
- KCFM Hull will no longer be offering commentary of Hull KR and Hull matches.

All Super League commentaries on any station are available via the particular stations on-line streaming.

=== Internet ===
ESPN3 has worldwide broadband rights.

Starting from Thursday 9 April 2009, all of the matches shown on Sky Sports will also be available live online via Livestation everywhere in the world excluding the US, Puerto Rico, UK, Ireland, France, Monaco, Australia and New Zealand. List of Super League games available on Livestation.com
