= Gateshead Thunder =

Gateshead Thunder may refer to:

- Gateshead Thunder (1999), a rugby league team formed in 1999 and then merged with Hull Sharks
- Gateshead Thunder (2000), a rugby league team formed in 2000, which became Newcastle Thunder in 2015
