= Super League =

Professional rugby league league

- Current season, competition or edition: 2026 Super League season
- Sport: Rugby league
- Founded: 1996; 30 years ago
- No. of teams: 14
- Country: England; France
- Most recent champion: Wakefield Trinity (1st title)
- Most titles: St Helens (10 titles)
- Broadcaster: Sky Sports BBC L’Equipe TV3 International Broadcasters
- Level on pyramid: 1
- Domestic cup: Challenge Cup
- International cup: World Club Challenge
- Website: www.superleague.co.uk

The Super League (legally Super League Europe Ltd.) is a professional rugby league competition, and the highest level of the British rugby league system, which currently consists of fourteen teams, twelve from Northern England, the sport's heartland, and two from southern France.

Super League began in 1996, replacing the Rugby Football League Championship First Division which had been running continuously since 1895, and switching from a winter to a summer season.

The regular season runs from February to September, with each team playing 27 games; 13 home games, 13 away games, and Magic Weekend. The top six then enter play-offs leading to the Super League Grand Final which determines the champions.

The Super League champions take on the champions of the Australian National Rugby League in the World Club Challenge.

Twenty-five clubs have competed since the inception of the Super League since 1996: twenty from England, three from France, one from Wales and one from Canada. Six of them have won the title: St Helens (10), Leeds Rhinos (8), Wigan Warriors (7), Bradford Bulls (4), Hull Kingston Rovers and Wakefield Trinity (1).

== History ==
=== Background and establishment ===
During the 1950s, British rugby league experienced a boom in popularity. However the twenty years that followed saw attendances and popularity decline. A "Super League" was first suggested as far back as the 1970s as a way to address the decline. By the early 1990s the sport was still struggling with dwindling attendances, poor facilities and was dominated by one club, Wigan, who were the only full time professional team.

In 1992, the then Chief Executive of the Rugby Football League, Maurice Lindsay reopened the idea for a Super League. He wanted the new league to break the stereotype of rugby league being a sport only played in Northern England, and had a vision for clubs to play out of new facilities under a set of minimum standards in an unpublished document called "Framing the Future".

Lindsay's Super League was given a boost during the mid 90s Australian Super League war. A Rupert Murdoch backed Super League in Australia was trying to gain broadcasting supremacy over the Australian Rugby League. In an attempt to gain the upper hand, Murdoch, whose broadcasting company BSkyB already had the rights to the First Division, approached the RFL.

A £77 million offer and an £87 million payment aided the decision. It was agreed a 14 team Super League would take place in 1996, switching the sport from winter to summer and making every team full time.

As part of the agreement, the Super League would be a European competition. Rugby league held a traditional heartland in the South of France and so Toulouse Olympique were invited (however never ended up taking a place in Super League I). A second club from the French leagues was also planned to be invited but the French government refused their backing unless there was a team from Paris, thus Paris Saint-Germain were founded as the second French club playing under the same name and colours as the association football club.

As well as two French clubs being involved, several mergers between English clubs were put forward:

- Castleford, Wakefield Trinity and Featherstone Rovers would form Calder
- Hull F.C. and Hull Kingston Rovers would form Humberside
- Salford and Oldham were to form Manchester
- Sheffield Eagles and Doncaster were to form South Yorkshire
- Warrington and Widnes were to form Cheshire
- Whitehaven, Workington Town, Barrow and Carlisle would form Cumbria

The proposal to merge neighbouring clubs, many of whom were local rivals and had been part of communities for a hundred years, proved unpopular. On Good Friday 1995 it was announced that Toulouse had pulled out and Widnes had their own place alongside Warrington, this as well as anti-merger campaigns and debates in parliament effectively killing any chance of mergers happening.

The first major change before the Super League happened in the 1994–95 season. It was decided the teams finishing in the top ten of the First Division would be in the Super League. Teams finishing 11–15 would be relegated to the Second Division while the bottom team would be relegated to the new Third Division. In the current Second Division the top seven teams would remain while the rest would make up the Third Division.

Controversy occurred at the end of 1994–95 when Keighley won the Second Division but were denied promotion due to fourth placed London Broncos being fast tracked to the First Division as Lindsay wanted the Super League to have greater national coverage. This resulted in a legal challenge from Keighley and Widnes who were both denied a place in the Super League.

The 1995–96 season would be the last to be played in winter and fittingly was the sport's centenary year. The season was kept short, starting in August and finishing in January, with the 1995 World Cup taking place in October.

=== 1996–1997: First seasons ===
Super League finally kicked off in 1996 with the 12 founding teams being:

- Bradford Bulls
- Castleford Tigers
- Halifax
- Leeds Rhinos
- London Broncos
- Oldham Bears
- Paris Saint-Germain
- Sheffield Eagles
- St. Helens
- Warrington Wolves
- Wigan Warriors
- Workington Town

Along with the new league, new rules were introduced. Squad numbers were adopted, a video referee was at every televised game and the salary cap was introduced to stop clubs overspending and to allow for a more level playing field. Super League was also more Americanised with clubs adopting nicknames and the league seasons copying the NFL's Super Bowl being known as a Roman numeral rather than a year (e.g. Super League 1996 was known as Super League I).

The first game was on 29 March which saw PSG beat Sheffield 30–24 in front of 17,873 people at Charlety Stadium. The inaugural Super League title was won by St Helens, breaking Wigan's stronghold for the first time since 1989 while Workington were relegated.

St Helens were unable to defend their title as Super League's second season was won by the Bradford Bulls with London Broncos justifying the decision to be fast tracked into Super League by finishing second. Oldham were relegated and PSG, who had finished 11th for the second consecutive time were dissolved after it was discovered some of their overseas players had tourist visas to avoid paying French tax.

=== 1998–2008: Introduction of the Grand Final ===
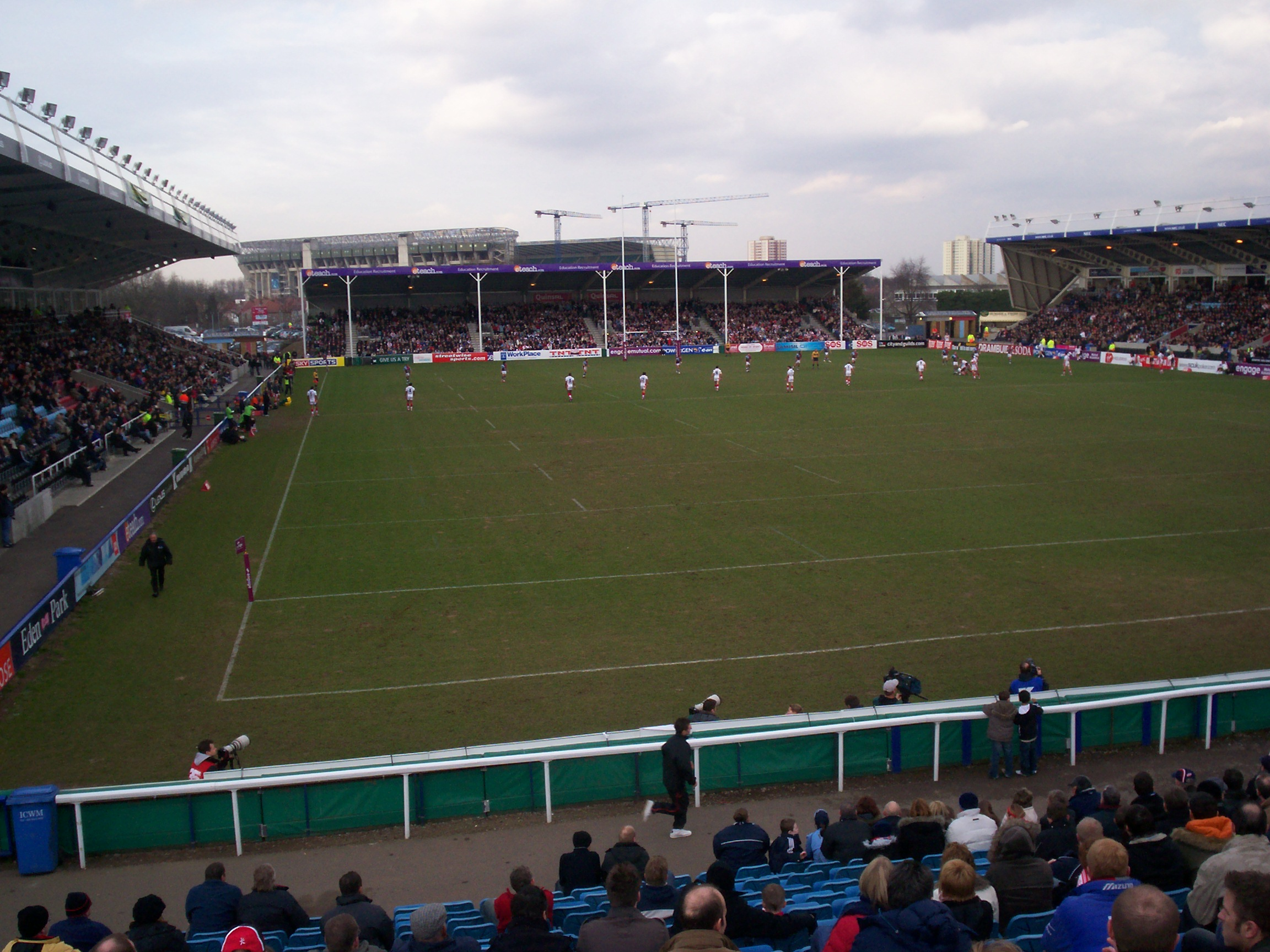
Harlequins vs St Helens in the 2008 regular season

Due to Oldham being relegated and PSG folding, two teams, Hull Sharks and Huddersfield Giants, were promoted. It was also announced ahead of the 1998 season that there would be no relegation as the league planned to expand to 14 teams from 1999.

Following PSG folding, and as a result only English teams being present in the competition, the league was not referred to as a European competition from then on out and acted solely as the top tier of the British rugby league system.

The other major change was that a playoff would decide the Champions. This was not new to rugby league as a playoff system had been in use for most of the sports existence although one hadn't been used since 1973. Confusingly a playoff did take place at the end of the season but was separate from the official league season and thus didn't count towards anything. Old Trafford the venue for the old Premiership Playoff Final would be used to host the new Grand Final in which the top five Super League teams would contest.

The first Grand Final took place at Old Trafford in front of a sellout crowd of 40,000 who watched Wigan defeat Leeds 12–8, their first league title since the old First Division.

Ahead of the expansion to 14 clubs Wakefield Trinity were promoted from the Second Division and a new club, Gateshead Thunder were awarded a place in Super League in 1999, which was won by St Helens who beat Bradford in the Grand Final.

Gateshead had a successful debut season on the field finishing two points off the playoffs however off the field the club was suffering financial difficulties. By the end of the season Gateshead announced they would merge with Hull Sharks who were to revert to being known as Hull FC. Gateshead weren't the only club struggling, Sheffield announced they could no longer continue and merged with Huddersfield and would be known as Huddersfield-Sheffield Giants. Due to these two clubs resigning from the league it was agreed Super League would revert to 12 teams after just one season.

Relegation was reintroduced in 2001 with one team going down each year. The only major change to the league was in 2002 when the playoffs were expanded to six teams. The League Leaders Shield was introduced in 2003 to reward the team who finished top at the end of the regular season.

In 2005 it was announced a franchise was to be awarded to a French club, with Toulouse, Villeneuve and Catalans Dragons all applying. In the end Catalans, who were only founded in 2000 after a merger between two Perpignan based clubs, were chosen. Their debut season would be in 2006 and they would be exempt from relegation for the first three years. Their inclusion in Super League meant two clubs would be relegated in 2005. Bottom team Leigh were relegated with 11th placed Widnes.

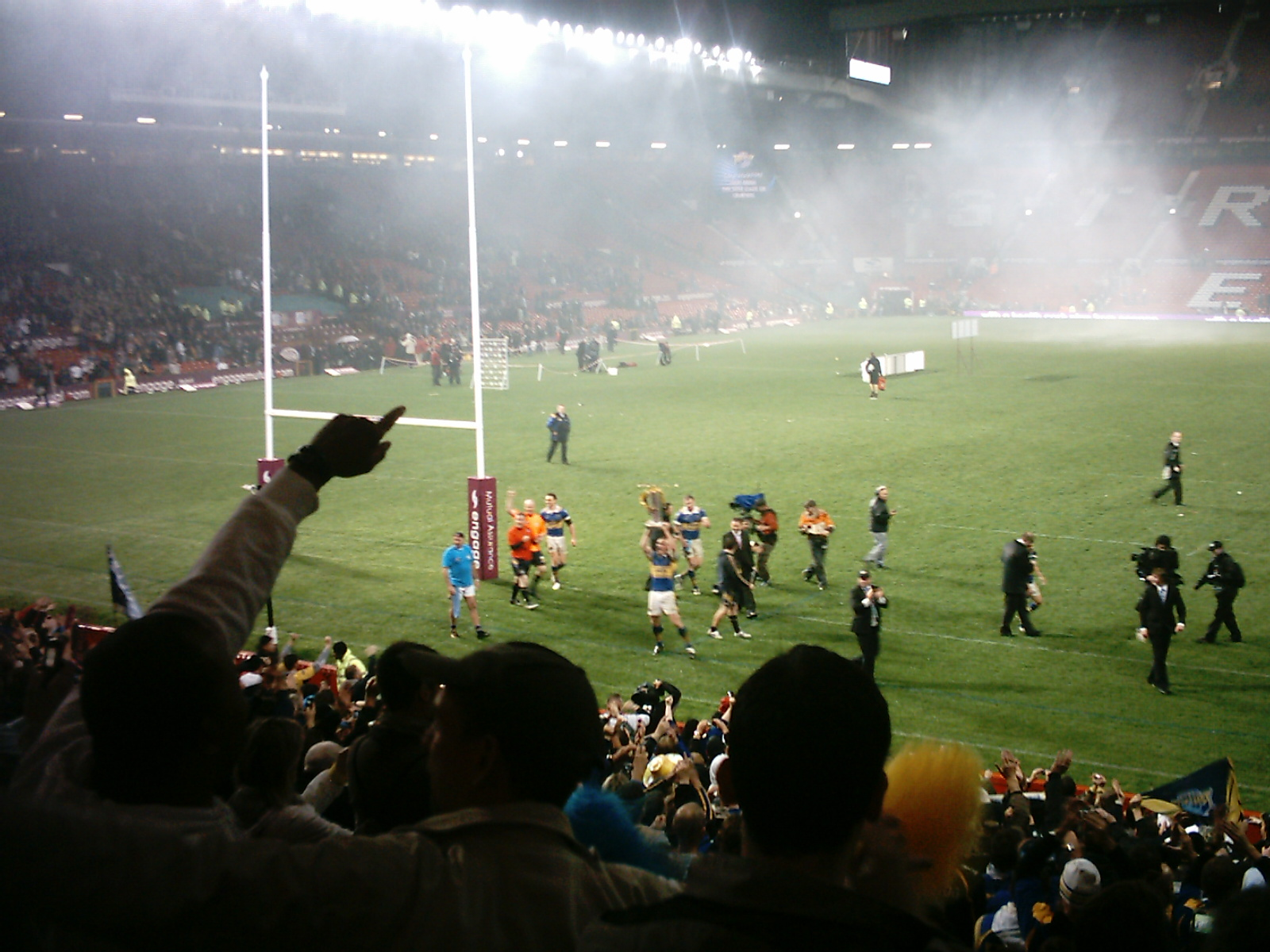
Leeds Rhinos celebrating winning the 2008 Super League Grand Final

By the mid-2000s standards on the field had improved and attendances increased but many clubs still played out of crumbling stadiums and most of the sport was still played in the North of England. There was also the emergence of the "Big Four" (Bradford, Leeds, Wigan, and St Helens) who were dominating the league during its first 10 seasons.

=== 2009–2014: Expansion and licensing ===
Announced in May 2005, to try and combat the issues facing Super League, the RFL introduced licences as the new determinant of the Super League competition's participants from 2009 with relegation scrapped, two new teams would expand the league to 14. The licences were awarded after consideration of more factors than simply the on-the-field performance of a club. After 2007 automatic promotion and relegation was suspended for Super League with new teams to be admitted on a licence basis with the term of the licence to start in 2009.

The RFL stated that clubs applying to compete in Super League would be assessed by criteria in four areas (stadium facilities, finance and business performance, commercial and marketing and playing strength, including junior production and development) with the final evaluations and decisions being taken by the RFL board of directors.

Successful applicants were able to be licensed for three years of Super League competition and three-yearly reviews of Super League membership took place with the stated aim of allowing the success of ambitious clubs lower down the leagues.

Points attained by each club's application are translated into licence grades A, B or C. Clubs who achieved an A or B Licence would be automatically awarded a place in the Super League, while those who achieved a C Licence underwent further scrutiny before the RFL decided who made the final cut.

First licensing period

In June 2008, the RFL confirmed that the Super League would be expanded from 12 teams to 14 in 2009 with the playoffs also expanding to 8 teams, and on 22 July 2008 the RFL confirmed the teams awarded licences. The teams announced were the 12 existing Super League teams along with National League 1 teams, Celtic Crusaders and Salford. Celtic Crusaders became the first Welsh team to play in Super League and the only team to be awarded a licence who had never played in the Super League previously.

Featherstone Rovers, Halifax, Leigh and Widnes all failed to attain a licence. Leigh and Widnes, especially, were disappointed with their exclusions with Leigh's chairman being extremely critical of the RFL.

By the end of the 2008 season, Salford and Celtic Crusaders finished 13th and 14th respectively and the Grand Final was won by the League Leaders, Leeds Rhinos for a fourth time. The following season Crusaders made the playoffs but were knocked out in the first round. League Leaders Wigan won the Grand Final.

By 2011 the Crusaders were suffering financial difficulties and entered administration and were deducted four points. Salford on the other hand despite never making the playoffs in the three years since they were promoted were in a much better financial position.

During this period the league was dominated by Leeds and St Helens with Leeds winning three titles and St Helens appearing in every Grand Final.

Second licensing period

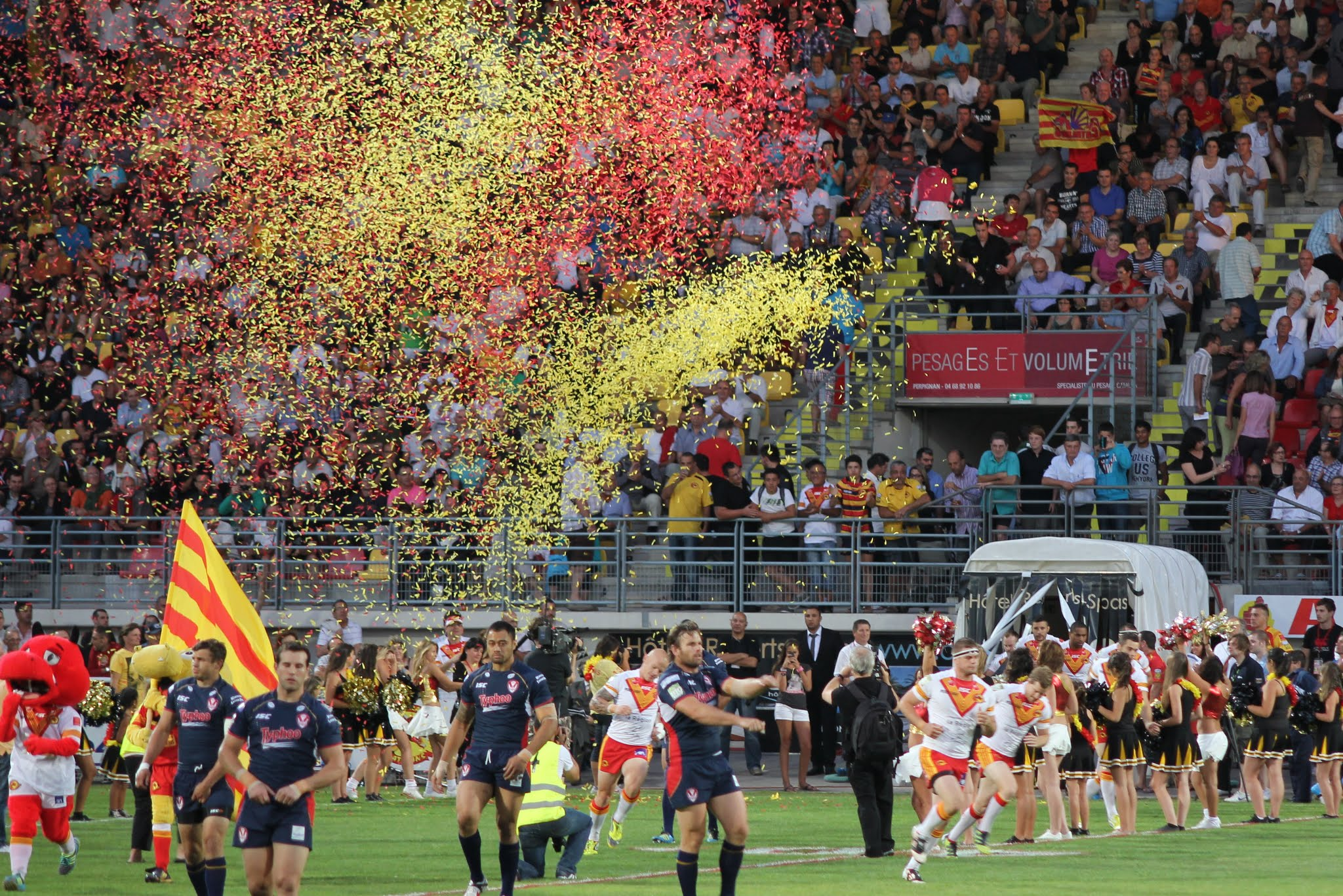
Pre match at a 2012 regular season game between Catalans and St Helens

For the 2012–14 seasons Championship sides Batley, Barrow, Featherstone Rovers, Halifax and Widnes all met the on-field criteria needed to submit an application, but despite this only Barrow, Halifax and Widnes decided to submit an application. On 31 March 2011 Widnes were awarded a Super League licence; Barrow did not meet the criteria and were refused a licence; and Halifax's application was to be further considered alongside the other Super League clubs.

The Rugby Football League's final decision was announced on 26 July 2011, Widnes would join thirteen existing Super League teams with Crusaders having withdrawn their application and Halifax being refused a license. Crusaders CEO Rod Findlay stated that the club's finances were not in a good enough condition to justify their place in Super League. Halifax chairman Mark Steele was critical of the decision to award Wakefield a licence over themselves, saying "If you compare Belle Vue with the Shay, it's no contest; if you compare playing records, it's no contest; and if you compare the financial position, we have kept our head above water and they haven't." Wakefield had been favourites to lose their licence before Crusaders' withdrawal.

=== 2015–2018: Super 8s ===
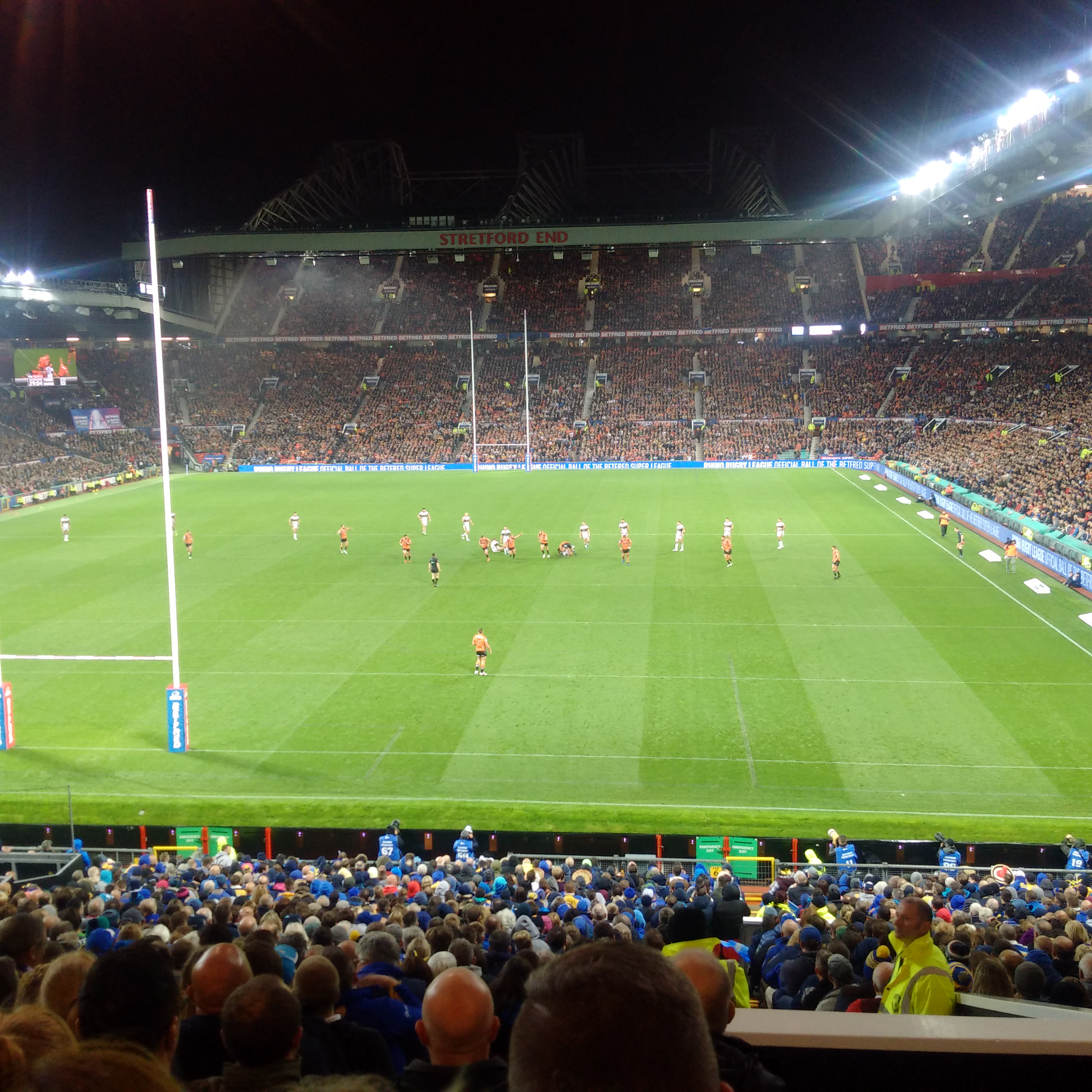
The 2017 Super League Grand Final

After two licensing periods the system started to fall out of favour. Some highlighted clubs such as Wakefield and Castleford which had failed to build new stadiums but were twice awarded licenses over Championship clubs who many thought would be better suited to Super League. There was also unrest in the Championship with clubs feeling their success on the pitch should be rewarded.

At the 2013 Annual General Meeting in Bradford, the Super League clubs agreed to reduce the number of clubs to 12 from 2015, and also for a return of promotion and relegation with a 12 club Championship.

A radical new league structure was proposed. The 12 Super League and 12 Championship clubs would play each other home and away over 22 rounds. Following the conclusion of their regular league seasons, the 24 clubs then competed in a play-off series where they split into 3 leagues of 8 based upon league position:

- The top eight Super League clubs continued to compete in the Super 8s. After playing each other once (either home or away), the top four clubs progressed to the semi-finals to determine who competed in the Grand Final to be crowned champions.
- The remaining (bottom four) Super League clubs and the top four Championship clubs competed in The Qualifiers. They played each other once (either home or away) to determine which four of the clubs would compete in Super League the following year.

Funding for clubs was tiered in both leagues to prevent relegation-related financial difficulties.

In preparation for the new structure, two clubs would be relegated from Super League in 2014 to reduce the league to 12. By the end of the season London Broncos and four-time Champions Bradford Bulls were relegated to the Championship.

In June 2015 eight of the 12 Super League clubs voted to allow a Marquee Player that could exceed a club's salary cap as long as they could afford their wages. The marquee player rule came into force for the 2016 Super League season.

The first Super 8s season was won by the Leeds Rhinos, with all four Super League clubs surviving the Qualifiers. The following year Hull KR were relegated when they lost to Salford in the Million Pound Game, with Leigh being promoted.

2017 saw Castleford finish top of the league for the first time in their history although they eventually lost the Grand Final to Leeds who claimed their 8th title.

By 2018 there were question marks over how successful the Super 8s were. Attendances after the split dropped and there was more interest in relegation than there was in the Super League 8s and playoffs.

=== 2019–2021: Abolishment of Super 8s, split from RFL, and COVID-19 pandemic ===
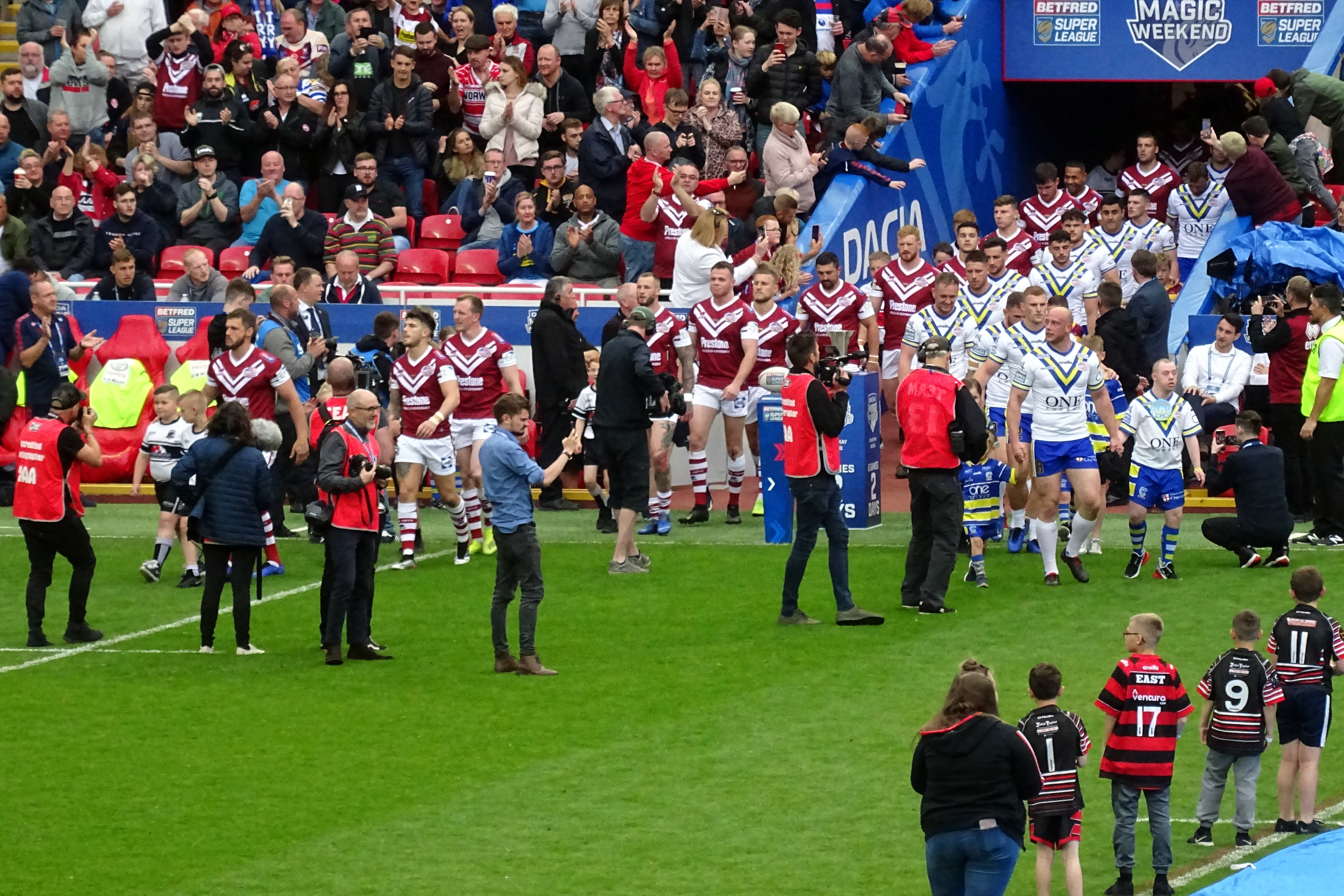
Wigan and Warrington walk out at Magic Weekend 2019

On 14 September 2018, an EGM was called to discuss the future of the sport. The Super League clubs were unhappy with the way the RFL was running the sport and wanted more control over future TV deals and sponsorship money. A vote went in favour of the Super League and they subsequently split from the RFL while also voting to scrap the Super 8s in favour of a more traditional league structure with a one up one down system for promotion and relegation.

As a result of the split the Super League appointed former Everton CEO Robert Elstone as Chief Executive. Elstone brought in new branding and new rules such as the shot clock to stop time wasting, and golden point extra time in favour of draws.

Elstone's success was short lived. After a successful 2019 season, the 2020 season was suspended due to the COVID-19 pandemic in the United Kingdom. The season was temporarily suspended during the national lockdown after which Toronto Wolfpack did not return to complete the season. There were calls made from Super League clubs for the two executive bodies – Super League and the RFL – to re-amalgamate following the financial difficulties from the pandemic.

On 14 December 2020, it was decided by unanimous vote that the Leigh Centurions would take the 12th spot in the 26th Super League season, replacing the Toronto Wolfpack who withdrew from the league as a result of financial difficulties caused by the pandemic. This came after the RFL cancelled the 2020 Championship season in response to the pandemic.

In February 2021 Elstone announced his resignation as Chief Executive of Super League, citing failures to bring outside investment to the league and the effects of the pandemic. Huddersfield's chairman Ken Davy was appointed as temporary Chief Executive until the end of the season. Subsequently, the new Sky Sports TV deal for the Super League and lower divisions was cut from £40 million to £25 million per year for the 2022 and 2023 seasons. This again had RFL and Super League officials calling for a realignment of the two governing bodies.

=== 2022–present: Realignment with RFL, IMG, and grading ===
On 22 March 2022, at a Special General Meeting it was announced the RFL and Super League were to officially realign after a majority of clubs voted in favour. A new company separate from the RFL was also set up to take care of the commercial side of the sport.

On 10 May 2022 the RFL announced it had signed a 12-year deal with sports marketing company IMG to maximise the sports growth.

IMG announced that they planned to scrap traditional promotion and relegation in favour of a return to licensing, although it would be slightly different to how it was executed before.

Clubs across all three divisions would be graded A, B or C. Clubs Graded A would be eligible for Super League and be immune from relegation with the rest of Super League being made up of the highest ranking Grade B clubs who could be moved between Super League and the Championship depending on how well they were rated. Clubs Graded C would make up the rest of the Championship and League One. The ultimate goal was to have a Super League with 12 Grade A clubs.

IMG announced grading criteria in March 2023, with clubs being judged on fandom, on field performances, finances, stadium and catchment.

==== 2026 expansion ====
On 28 July 2025, Super League executives voted to expand the league to 14 teams beginning with the 2026 season with at least two Championship teams joining the league. The additional two teams will not be fully subject to IMG Grading criteria; they will be independently judged by an RFL panel, based on "criteria relating to Finance and Sustainability".

Nine clubs applied to join Super League, two current Grade B Super League clubs (Hull FC and Huddersfield Giants) and seven Championship clubs (Bradford Bulls, Doncaster, London Broncos, Oldham, Toulouse Olympique, Widnes Vikings and York Knights).

Sky Sports's analysis stated that the Salford Red Devils's lack of application, as the only Grade B Super League club not to do so, is all but conformation of their relegation, resulting in a minimum of three teams being promoted.

On 16 October 2025, it was announced that Bradford Bulls would be controversially promoted to the Super League due to finishing 10th in the overall IMG gradings. They would replace Salford Red Devils, who were relegated to the Championship due to finishing 15th in the gradings.

On 17 October 2025, it was announced that Toulouse Olympique and York Knights would also be promoted to the expanded Super League as a result of an independent panel's recommendation.

== Structure ==
=== Regular season ===
There are 14 clubs in the Super League. During the course of the season (usually from February to September) each club plays the other twice, once at their home stadium and once at their opponent's. Clubs also play an additional 'Loop Fixture', Magic Weekend. Altogether clubs play 27 games.

Teams receive two points for a win. If a game is drawn at full time, 20 minutes of Golden point are played. If teams are still drawn after Golden point, both teams are awarded a point. No points are awarded for a defeat.

Teams are ranked by competition points, points difference (points scored less points conceded), points scored. The team finishing top after 27 games is awarded the League Leaders' Shield.

=== Play-offs ===
The play-offs have had various formats. Currently once every club has played 27 games, the top six teams qualify for the playoffs.

Round one sees 3rd v 6th and 4th v 5th. The winners then progress to the semi finals where the teams finishing 1st and 2nd enter. The two winners of the semi-finals meet in the Grand Final.

=== Grand Final ===
The Grand Final is the championship-deciding game and showpiece event of the Super League season. It is held annually at Old Trafford, with the exception of 2020 when it was hosted at the KCOM Stadium in Hull in front of no supporters due to the COVID-19 pandemic.

City	Stadium	Years
(England) Manchester	Old Trafford	1998–2019, 2021–present
(England) Hull	MKM Stadium	2020

== Clubs ==
=== Current clubs ===
Super League clubs
Colours	Club	Established	Location	Stadium (Capacity)	Titles (Last)^{d}
	Bradford Bulls^{a}	1907	Bradford, West Yorkshire	Odsal Stadium (26,019)	6 (2005)
	Castleford Tigers^{a}	1926	Castleford, West Yorkshire	Wheldon Road (10,500)	0
	Catalans Dragons	2000	Perpignan, Pyrénées-Orientales	Stade Gilbert Brutus (13,000)	0
	Huddersfield Giants^{c}	1864	Dewsbury, West Yorkshire	Crown Flatt (5,100)	7 (1962)
	Hull FC^{c}	1865	Kingston upon Hull, East Yorkshire	MKM Stadium (25,586)	6 (1983)
	Hull Kingston Rovers	1882	Kingston upon Hull, East Yorkshire	Craven Park (11,000)	6 (2025)
	Leeds Rhinos^{abc}	1870	Leeds, West Yorkshire	Headingley Stadium (19,700)	11 (2017)
	Leigh Leopards^{c}	1878	Leigh, Greater Manchester	Leigh Sports Village (12,000)	2 (1982)
	St Helens^{abc}	1873	St Helens, Merseyside	BrewDog Stadium (18,000)	17 (2022)
	Toulouse Olympique	1937	Toulouse, Haute-Garonne	Stade Ernest-Wallon (19,500)	0
	Wakefield Trinity^{c ‡}	1873	Wakefield, West Yorkshire	Belle Vue (9,333)	3 (2026)
	Warrington Wolves^{abc}	1876	Warrington, Cheshire	Halliwell Jones Stadium (15,300)	3 (1955)
	Wigan Warriors^{abc}	1872	Wigan, Greater Manchester	Brick Community Stadium (25,138)	24 (2024)
	York Knights	2002	York, North Yorkshire	York Community Stadium (8,500)	0

Notes

^{a}: Founding member of the Super League
^{b}: Appeared in every Super League season since 1996
^{c}: One of the original 22 RFL teams
^{d}: Includes First Division titles won prior to the inaugural Super League season in 1996.

‡	Current Champions

=== Former Super League clubs ===
Club	Seasons in Super League	First season in Super League	Last season in Super League	Titles (Most recent top division title)	Location
Salford	27	1997	2025	1975–76	(England) Barton-upon-Irwell
London Broncos	21	1996	2024	N/A	(England) Wimbledon
Widnes Vikings	11	2002	2018	1988–89	(England) Widnes
Halifax Panthers	8	1996	2003	1985–86	(England) Halifax
Sheffield Eagles	4	1996	1999	N/A	(England) Sheffield
Crusaders § (Note: Active as North Wales Crusaders)	3	2009	2011	N/A	(Wales) Bridgend (Wales) Wrexham
Oldham	2	1996	1997	1956–57	(England) Oldham
Paris Saint-Germain §	2	1996	1997	N/A	(France) Paris
Gateshead Thunder §	1	1999	1999	N/A	(England) Gateshead
Workington Town	1	1996	1996	1950–51	(England) Workington
Toronto Wolfpack	1	2020	2020	N/A	(Canada) Toronto

- § Denotes club now defunct

== Results ==
=== Champions ===
For the first two Super League seasons, Champions were decided by a round robin system. The league format changed in 1998 with a play-off series used to determine the Super League champions for the first since 1972–73.

Club	Winners	Runners-up	Winning seasons
St Helens	10	5	1996, 1999, 2000, 2002, 2006, 2014, 2019, 2020, 2021, 2022
Leeds Rhinos	8	3	2004, 2007, 2008, 2009, 2011, 2012, 2015, 2017
Wigan Warriors	7	8	1998, 2010, 2013, 2016, 2018, 2023, 2024
Bradford Bulls	4	3	1997, 2001, 2003, 2005
Hull Kingston Rovers	1	1	2025
Wakefield Trinity	1	0	2026
Warrington Wolves	0	5	N/A
Catalans Dragons	0	2	N/A
Castleford Tigers	0	1	N/A
Hull FC	0	1	N/A
London Broncos	0	1	N/A
Salford Red Devils	0	1	N/A

=== League Leaders' Shield ===
The League Leaders' Shield was first awarded in 2003, and is given to the team finishing the regular season top of Super League.

	Club	Shield Wins	Winning years
1	St Helens	8	2005, 2006, 2007, 2008, 2014, 2018, 2019, 2022
2	Wigan Warriors	6	2010, 2012, 2020, 2023, 2024, 2026
3	Leeds Rhinos	3	2004, 2009, 2015
4	Warrington Wolves	2	2011, 2016
5	Bradford Bulls	1	2003
5	Huddersfield Giants	1	2013
5	Castleford Tigers	1	2017
5	Catalans Dragons	1	2021
5	Hull Kingston Rovers	1	2025

=== The Double ===
	Club	Wins	Winning years
1	Wigan Warriors	8	1990–91, 1991–92, 1992–93, 1993–94, 1994–95, 1995–96, 2013, 2024
2	St. Helens	4	1965–66, 1996, 2006, 2021
3	Huddersfield Giants	2	1912–13, 1914–15
4	Swinton Lions	1	1927–28
4	Broughton Rangers	1	1901–02
4	Halifax Panthers	1	1902–03
4	Hunslet	1	1907–08
4	Bradford Bulls	1	2003
4	Leeds Rhinos	1	2015
4	Hull Kingston Rovers	1	2025

=== The Treble ===
	Club	Wins	Winning years
1	Wigan Warriors	4	1991–92, 1993–94, 1994–95, 2024
2	Huddersfield Giants	2	1912–13, 1914–15
2	St. Helens	2	1965–66, 2006
4	Swinton Lions	1	1927–28
4	Bradford Bulls	1	2003
4	Leeds Rhinos	1	2015
4	Hull Kingston Rovers	1	2025

=== The Quadruple ===
	Club	Wins	Winning years
1	Wigan Warriors	2 (Note: Wigan have a widely misreported quadruple in 1994–95, with the club winning the treble in addition to the 1994–95 Regal Trophy. Note: No World Club Challenge was held in 1995 as it did not become a regular competition until 2000.)	1993–94, 2024 (Note: This is the first widely reported quadruple to include the calendar year's World Club Challenge and not the following season's. Note: The 2025 World Club Challenge was abandoned by Penrith Panthers, although no title was awarded for 2025, Wigan, without challenge, retained their title for a second year.)
2	Bradford Bulls	1	2003
2	St. Helens	1	2006
2	Hull Kingston Rovers	1	2026

== Awards ==
=== Super League Trophy ===
The winner of the Grand Final is given the Super League Trophy as Super League Champions. This is considered more prestigious than the minor premiership. Each year, the year of a champion team's triumph, team name and team Rugby league football captain are engraved.

The current holders of the title is Wakefield Trinity

The record for most Super League titles won is held by St Helens with ten titles. Leeds captain Kevin Sinfield currently holds the record for captaining the most Super League title winning sides after captaining Leeds to their first seven grand final successes. St. Helens contested the final six years in a row (from 2006 until 2011) during which time they succeeded only once in lifting the trophy against Hull F.C. in 2006; after which they suffered consecutive defeats against Leeds in 2007, 2008, 2009, Wigan in 2010 and Leeds once again in 2011. However, St. Helens made a victorious return in 2014, defeating rivals Wigan 14–6, and have since won a further four grand finals, defeating Salford in 2019, Wigan in 2020 and Catalans Dragons in 2021 and Leeds in 2022.

Wigan have lost the most Grand Finals, seven, however St Helens' record of five consecutive years as runners-up remains unchallenged. Hull F.C. (2006), Warrington (2012, 2013, 2016, 2018 and 2026), Castleford (2017), Salford (2019) and Catalans (2021), have all appeared in the Grand Final but never won.

=== Steve Prescott Man of Steel award ===
The Man of Steel Award is an annual award for the best player of the season in Super League. It has continued from pre-Super League times, with the first such award given in 1977. It was renamed in honour of Steve Prescott in 2014.

=== Albert Goldthorpe Medal ===
The Albert Goldthorpe Medal is an award voted for be members of the press who cast a vote after every game of the regular season. The three players who, in the opinion of the reporter, have been the three 'best and fairest' players in the game will receive three points, two points and one point respectively. To be eligible for a vote, a player must not have been suspended from the competition at any stage during the season.

=== Super League Dream Team ===
Each season a "Dream Team" is also named. The best thirteen players in their respective positions are voted for by members of the sports press. The 2026 dream team is as follows:

#	Player	Team	Appearance
1	(Australia) Lachie Miller	Leeds Rhinos	1
2	(Fiji) Maika Sivo	Leeds Rhinos	1
3	(England) Ash Handley	Leeds Rhinos	3
4	(England) Umyla Hanley	Leigh Leopards	2
5	(England) Zach Eckersley	Wigan Warriors	1
6	(Australia) Brodie Croft	Leeds Rhinos	2
7	(England) Jake Connor	Leeds Rhinos	2
8	(England) Caleb Hamlin-Uele	Wakefield Trinity	1
9	(England) Brad O'Neill	Wigan Warriors	1
10	(Tonga) Joe Ofahengaue	Leigh Leopards	1
11	(France) Mathieu Jussaume	Toulouse Olympique	1
12	(England) James McDonnell	Leeds Rhinos	2
13	(England) Ben Currie	Warrington Wolves	2

== Coaches ==
Nat.	Name	Club	Appointed	Time as head coach
(Ireland)	Kurt Haggerty	Bradford Bulls	17 September 2025	1 year, 66 days
(England)	Chris Chester (interim)	Castleford Tigers	7 August 2026	107 days
(Australia)	John Cartwright	Catalans Dragons	19 May 2026	187 days
(Australia)	Jim Lenihan	Huddersfield Giants	8 May 2026	198 days
(England)	Andy Last (interim)	Hull F.C.	17 April 2026	219 days
(Australia)	Willie Peters	Hull Kingston Rovers	4 September 2022	4 years, 79 days
(Australia)	Brad Arthur	Leeds Rhinos	10 July 2024	2 years, 135 days
(Papua New Guinea)	Adrian Lam	Leigh Leopards	17 November 2021	5 years, 5 days
(Ireland)	Eamon O'Carroll (interim)	St. Helens	23 July 2026	122 days
(France)	Sylvain Houles	Toulouse Olympique	1 December 2013	12 years, 356 days
(England)	Daryl Powell	Wakefield Trinity	23 October 2023	3 years, 30 days
(England)	Sam Burgess	Warrington Wolves	1 October 2023	3 years, 52 days
(England)	Matt Peet	Wigan Warriors	5 October 2021	5 years, 48 days
(England)	Mark Applegarth	York Knights	5 June 2024	2 years, 170 days

=== Head coaches with Super League titles ===
The Super League has been won by 18 coaches, 11 from Australia, 6 from England and 1 from New Zealand.

	Head Coach	Wins	Winning years
1	(England) Brian McDermott	4	2011, 2012, 2015, 2017
3	(England) Brian Noble	3	2001, 2003, 2005
3	(England) Shaun Wane	3	2013, 2016, 2018
3	(Australia) Kristian Woolf	3	2020, 2021, 2022
4	(Australia) Ian Millward	2	2000, 2002
4	(Australia) Tony Smith	2	2004, 2007
4	(New Zealand) Brian McClennan	2	2008, 2009
4	(England) Matt Peet	2	2023, 2024
10	(Australia) Shaun McRae	1	1996
10	(Australia) Matthew Elliott	1	1997
10	(Australia) John Monie	1	1998
10	(England) Ellery Hanley	1	1999
10	(Australia) Daniel Anderson	1	2006
10	(Australia) Michael Maguire	1	2010
10	(Australia) Nathan Brown	1	2014
10	(Australia) Justin Holbrook	1	2019
10	(Australia) Willie Peters	1	2025
10	(England) Daryl Powell	1	2026

=== Top 10 coaches by Super League games coached ===
- Bold indicates coach still at club
- Italic indicates coach still active as a head coach in Rugby League but not in Super League at this time

Statistics correct as of 3 October 2026

Rank	Player	Club(s)	Games
1	(Australia) Tony Smith	Huddersfield (2001, 2003); Leeds (2004–2007); Warrington (2009–2017); Hull KR (2019–2022); Hull (2023–2024)	536
2	(England) **Daryl Powell**	Leeds (2001–2003); Castleford (2013–2021); Warrington (2022–2023); Wakefield (2025–)	422
3	(England) Brian McDermott	London (2007–2010); Leeds (2011–2018); Toronto (2020)	340
4	(England) **Steve McNamara**	Bradford (2006–2010); Catalans (2017–2025); Hull (2027-present)	324
5	(England) Brian Noble	Bradford (2001–2006); Wigan (2006–2009); Crusaders (2010); Salford (2013–2014)	321
6	(Australia) Shaun McRae	St. Helens (1996–1998); Gateshead (1999); Hull (2000–2004); Salford (2007, 2009–2011)	312
7	(England) John Kear	Sheffield (1997–1999); Huddersfield (2000); Hull (2005–2006); Wakefield (2006–2011)	272
8	(England) Richard Agar	Hull (2006, 2008–2011); Wakefield (2012–2014); Leeds (2019–2022)	236
9=	(Wales) Ian Watson	Salford (2015–2020); Huddersfield (2021–2024)	228
9=	(Australia) Ian Millward	St. Helens (2000–2005); Wigan (2005–2006); Castleford (2012–2013)	228

== Players ==
- Statistics are correct as of 3 October 2026.

=== Appearances ===
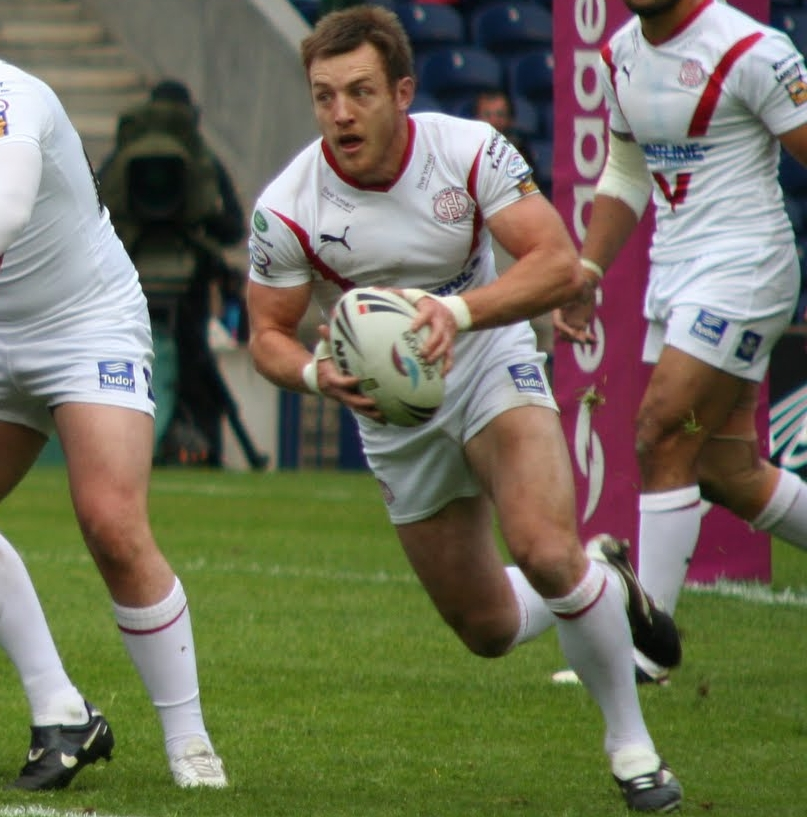
Former St Helens captain James Roby holds the record for appearances in Super League with 495 appearances

- Note that appearances from the bench are also included in this list. Excluding appearances in Qualifiers

Most appearances
Rank	Player	Apps
1	(England) James Roby	495
2	(England) Kevin Sinfield	454
3	(England) Andy Lynch	452
4	(England) Paul Wellens	442
5	(England) Jamie Peacock	438
6	(England) Leon Pryce	432
7	(England) (Ireland) Louie McCarthy-Scarsbrook	430
8=	(England) Ben Westwood	429
8=	(England) Rob Burrow	429
10	(England) Ryan Hall	425
As of 3 October 2026 Italicised players still playing professional rugby league. **Bolded** players still playing in Super League.

=== Tries ===
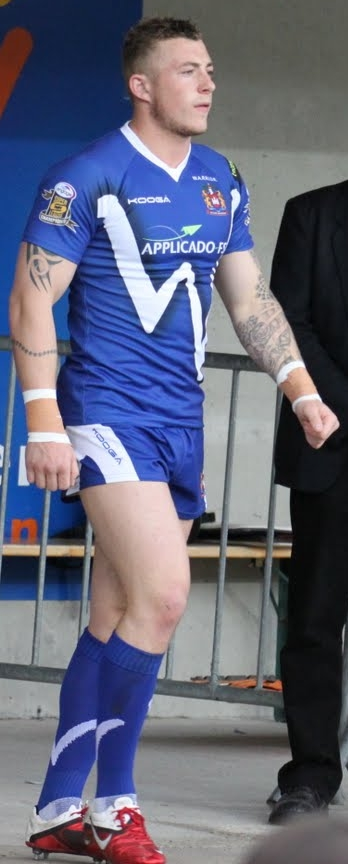
Leigh Leopards winger Josh Charnley (pictured playing for Wigan in 2011) is the highest ever try scorer in Super League with 281 tries

Most tries
Rank	Player	Tries
1	(England) **Josh Charnley**	281
2	(England) Ryan Hall	274
3	(England) Danny McGuire	247
4	(England) Tommy Makinson	210
5=	(England) Paul Wellens	199
5=	(England) Keith Senior	199
7	(England) Jermaine McGillvary	196
8	(England) Ryan Atkins	186
9	(England) Tom Briscoe	182
10	(England) Leon Pryce	173
As of 3 October 2026 Italicised players still playing professional rugby league. **Bolded** players still playing in Super League.

=== Points ===
Most points
Rank	Player	Points
1	(England) Kevin Sinfield	3,443
2	(Scotland) (England) Danny Brough	2,462
3	(England) Paul Deacon	2,415
4	(England) Marc Sneyd	2,396
5	(England) Andy Farrell	2,376
6	(Ireland) Pat Richards	2,280
7	(England) Danny Tickle	2,267
8	(Wales) Lee Briers	2,240
9	(England) Sean Long	2,202
10	(England) Stefan Ratchford	1,696
As of 3 October 2026 Italicised players still playing professional rugby league. **Bolded** players still playing in Super League.

=== Winning captains ===
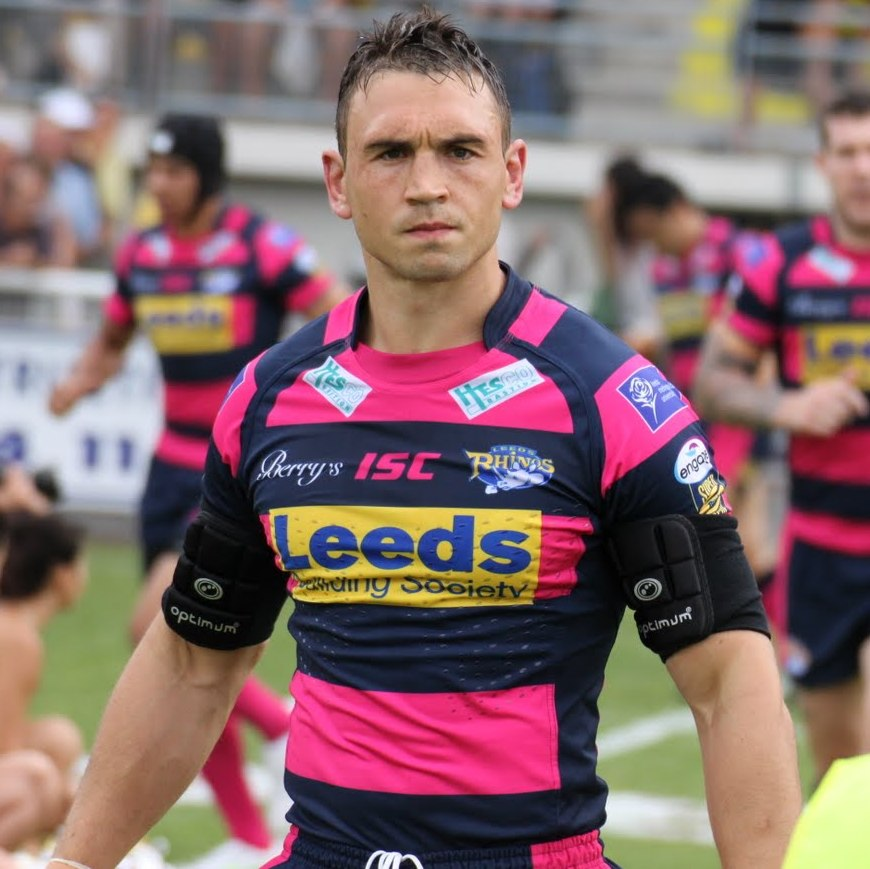
Kevin Sinfield captained the Leeds Rhinos to seven Grand Final victories, the most in Super League history by one player

14 players have captained teams to win the Super League.

	Captain	Wins	Winning years
1	(England) Kevin Sinfield	7	2004, 2007, 2008, 2009, 2011, 2012, 2015
2	(England) Sean O'Loughlin	4	2010, 2013, 2016, 2018
2	(England) James Roby	4	2019, 2020, 2021, 2022
4	(England) Chris Joynt	3	1999, 2000, 2002
4	(New Zealand) Robbie Paul	3	1997, 2001, 2003
6	(England) Liam Farrell	2	2023, 2024
7	(England) Bobbie Goulding	1	1996
7	(England) Andy Farrell	1	1998
7	(England) Jamie Peacock	1	2005
7	(England) Sean Long	1	2006
7	(England) Paul Wellens	1	2014
7	(England) Danny McGuire	1	2017
7	(England) Elliot Minchella	1	2025
7	(England) Mike McMeeken	1	2026

== Sponsorship ==
Since its inaugural season in 1996, the Super League has been sponsored seven times with the first sponsor, Stones Bitter continuing to be title sponsors having sponsored the old First Division since 1986. With the exception of the 2013 season, the league has had a title sponsor every year.

Period	Sponsor	Name
1996–1997	Stones Bitter	Stones Super League
1998–1999	JJB Sports	JJB Super League
2000–2004	Tetley's Bitter	Tetley's Super League
2005–2011	Engage Mutual Assurance	Engage Super League
2012	Stobart Group	Stobart Super League
2013	no sponsor	Super League
2014–2016	First Utility	First Utility Super League
2017–2026	Betfred	Betfred Super League

As well as title sponsorship, Super League has a number of official partners and suppliers. For the 2017 season these include Kingstone Press Cider, Dacia, Foxy Bingo, Batchelors and Specsavers.

The official rugby ball supplier is Steeden.

=== Logo ===
logo used from 1996 to 2016

The Super League has had three official logos. The first was used from the inaugural season in 1996 until 2016. The logo had the Super League S with Super above it and League below it. The title sponsors name would appear above the logo until 2014 when title sponsors First Utility used their own personalised logos that appeared on player shirts and in the media. The reigning champions had a ribbon around the logo with champions on it until 2011.

Logo from 2017 to 2019

The second official logo was introduced in 2017 as part of a radical rebrand across British rugby league. The design was deliberately similar to new Rugby Football League (RFL) and England team logos, in order to maintain a ubiquity of public message. It had a rectangular backdrop representing the George Hotel in Huddersfield (where rugby league was originally founded), thirteen lines representing thirteen players, a chevron (a traditional design feature on many rugby league shirts) and the S which represented the ball and the Super League. The reigning champions had the right to wear a gold version of the logo on their shirts.

Ahead of the 2020 Super League season, a brand new logo was revealed. This was designed by the same company who had recently redesigned the Premier League logo and was more simplistic than previous iterations. In 2024 this was updated by the marketing firm 160/90 to three separate logos, to represent the three Super League competitions, teal for Men's, Purple for Women's and Green for Wheelchair.

== Criticism ==
Since its formation in 1996 only six teams have won the Super League: Bradford, Leeds, St. Helens, Wigan, Wakefield Trinity and Hull Kingston Rovers. Also, only ten teams have taken part in the Grand Final: Hull FC, Castleford Tigers, Warrington Wolves, Salford Red Devils and Catalans Dragons being the other five, while Wakefield Trinity made their debut appearance in 2026. Nine teams have been the league leaders, however only one of these, Huddersfield Giants in 2013, has yet to appear in a Grand Final, meaning that only eleven different teams in total have been involved in the grand final or topped the regular season table; however, 25 teams have taken part in Super League since its inception. Prior to the 2026 Grand Final between Warrington and Wakefield, the last grand final to feature two sides other than Wigan, Leeds, St Helens or Bradford had occurred in 1991 when Hull F.C. defeated Widnes 14–4 in the premiership final. This had led to the criticism that Super League is effectively uncompetitive, by perpetuating success in the hands of a small number of wealthy clubs.

== Competition rules ==
=== Overseas quota and Federation-trained players ===
The Rugby Football League's overseas quota limits applies to the Super League. The quota limits the number of non-federation trained players to seven. In practice, a federation trained player must have played in Europe for three years before age 21. Various versions of this rule has existed throughout the competition's history since its inception in 1996. The current version of this rule was introduced in 2019, with only five non-federation trained players were allowed at the time.

As a result of the Kolpak ruling, non-federation trained player meant non-European not non-British. This stance was retained after Brexit.

The "New Play Rule" exempts players from a club's quota if they are signed from a different sport.

=== Salary cap ===
A salary cap was first introduced to the Super League in 1998, with clubs being allowed to spend up to 50 percent of their income on player wages. From the 2002 season onwards, the cap became a fixed ceiling of £1.8 million in order to increase parity within the league.

The Super League operates under a real-time salary cap system that will calculate a club's salary cap position at the start of and throughout the season:

- The combined earnings of the top 25 players must not exceed £1.825 million.
- Clubs will only be allowed to sign a new player if they have room under the cap.
- Clubs are allowed to spend a maximum of £50,000 on players outside the top 25 earners who have made at least one first grade appearance for the club during the year.
- Costs for players outside of the top 25 earners who do not make a first team appearance will be unregulated.
- Any player who has played for the same club for at least 10 consecutive seasons will have half their salary excluded from the salary cap for his 11th and subsequent seasons. This is subject to a maximum of £50,000 for any one club.
- Clubs are allowed one "Marquee Player" who can exceed a club's salary cap as long as they can afford the players wages.

In 2017, Super League clubs approved proposals to increase the salary cap over the next three seasons, eventually rising to £2.1 million by 2020. Clubs will also be allowed to sign a second marquee player.

=== Squad announcement system ===
Before each Super League fixture, each club must announce the squad of 19 players it will choose from by 2:00 pm on the second day before the match day.

== Media coverage ==
=== Television ===
Sky Sports have been the primary broadcast partner of Super League since its inaugural season in 1996. The current deal lasts between 2024 until 2026, which will see, for the first time ever, Sky Sports producing all six matches per week, and each will be broadcast live in some form.

The 2024 season also saw the creation of Super League+SuperLeague+ | Live Rugby League, a dedicated streaming service which would broadcast four out of six matches per round live, with the other two matches on a 48-hour delay.

For the 2022 and 2023 seasons, Channel 4 had the rights to broadcast ten matches, consisting of eight regular season plus two play-off games. The BBC obtained the same rights as Channel 4 had, beginning from the 2024 season, with the addition of extra matches shown on the Red Button and iPlayer.

Sky Sports broadcasts live Super League games in both the United Kingdom and Ireland. Broadcasting slots occur on Thursdays and Fridays at 19:30 or 19:55 (20:00 kick off), and varying times on weekend afternoon.

Duration	Broadcasters	Value per year	Games shown per year
1996–1999	Sky Sports	~£17 million	?
1999–2003	Sky Sports	~£12 million	?
2004–2008	Sky Sports	~£9 million	?
2009–2011	Sky Sports	~£18 million (Note: A small portion of this figure covered games in the Championship)	80
2012–2016	Sky Sports	~£18 million	100
2017–2021	Sky Sports	~£40 million	80
2022–2023	Sky Sports; Channel 4	~£26 million	66 + 10
2024–2026	Sky Sports; BBC; Super League+	~£20 million	~170

==== Highlights ====
In addition to Sky Sports' live coverage, BBC Sport previously broadcast a weekly highlights programme called the Super League Show, usually presented by Tanya Arnold. This was broadcast to the North West, Yorkshire, North East & Cumbria, and East Yorkshire & Lincolnshire regions on BBC One on Monday nights (after 11 pm) and was repeated nationally on BBC Two on Tuesday afternoons. A national repeat was first broadcast overnight during the week since February 2008 when the then BBC Director of Sport, Roger Mosey, commented that this move was in response to the growing popularity and awareness of the sport, and the large number of requests from people who want to watch it elsewhere in the UK. The end of season play-off series was shown nationwide in a highlights package. The Super League Show was also available for streaming or download using the BBC iPlayer in the UK.

The Super League Show was cancelled ahead of the 2024 season after Super League agreed a deal with Sky Sports to show every game.

Highlights programme	Duration	Broadcaster
Super League Show	1999–2023	BBC

==== International ====
Internationally, Super League is shown live by eight broadcasters in eight countries and regions.

Country/ Region	Broadcaster
Asia	Premier Sports
Australia	Fox League
Austria	Sportdigital
Germany	Sportdigital
Switzerland	Sportdigital
Canada	Sportsnet
Caribbean	Rush Sports
Catalonia	TV3
Fiji	FBC
France	Viàoccitanie
MENA	Dubai Sports
New Zealand	Sky Sport
Pacific Islands	Digicel
Papua New Guinea	NBC
United States	Fox Sports
Worldwide (Online)	SuperLeague+

=== Radio ===
Talksport is an official broadcaster of Super League, broadcasting commentaries and magazine programming on Talksport 2. BBC Radio 5 Sports Extra covers more than 70 Super League games through 5 Live Rugby League each Thursday and Friday night. Each three hour programme, in addition to live commentary also includes interviews and debate.

Super League is also covered extensively by BBC Local Radio:

Station	Area
BBC Radio Humberside	Hull
BBC Radio Leeds	West Yorkshire
BBC Radio Manchester	Salford, Wigan and Warrington.
BBC Radio Merseyside	St Helens, Warrington and Widnes.

The competition is also covered on commercial radio stations:

- Radio Yorkshire cover two matches per round featuring Yorkshire clubs.
- BCB 106.6 (Bradford Community Broadcasting) have full match commentary on Bradford home and away.
- Wish FM now Greatest Hits Radio previously had full match commentary on Wigan and St Helens matches home and away.
- Wire FM now Greatest Hits Radio previously had full match commentary of Warrington matches home and away.
- Grand Sud FM covers every Catalans Dragons home match (in French).
- Radio France Bleu Roussillon covers every Catalans Dragons away match (in French).

All Super League commentaries on any station are available via the particular stations on-line streaming.

=== Internet ===
ESPN3, formerly ESPN360, has had worldwide broadband rights since 2007 when they broadcast the 2007 Grand Final.

Since 9 April 2009, all of the matches shown on Sky Sports have also been available live online via Livestation everywhere in the world excluding the US, Puerto Rico, UK, Ireland, France, Monaco, Australia and New Zealand. In 2016 Livestation shut down, however these matches are also available online for UK users only through Sky Go and Now TV.

In the United Kingdom, a number of commercial radio stations, along with BBC Radio 5 Sports Extra and the local BBC radio stations simulcast commentary of Super League games on the internet.

== See also ==
- Super League records
- List of current and former Super League venues
- Rugby league in the British Isles
- British rugby league system
- List of professional sports teams in the United Kingdom
