= 2013 Catalans Dragons season =

- Super League XVIII Rank: n/a
- Play-off result: n/a
- Challenge Cup: n/a
- 2013 record: Wins: 5; draws: 1; losses: 2
- Points scored: For: 210; against: 155

Team information
- Chairman: Christopher Levy
- Head Coach: Laurent Frayssinous
- Captain: Grégory Mounis
- Stadium: Stade Gilbert Brutus

Top scorers
- Tries: Damien Blanch (6)
- Goals: Thomas Bosc (28)
- Points: Thomas Bosc (62)
← 2012	List of seasons	2014 →

This article details the Catalans Dragons rugby league football club's 2013 season. This is their 8th season in the Super League.

== Table ==
Super League XVIII
Pos	Team	Pld	W	D	L	PF	PA	PD	Pts	Qualification
1	Huddersfield Giants (L)	27	21	0	6	851	507	+344	42	Play-offs
2	Warrington Wolves	27	20	1	6	836	461	+375	41	Play-offs
3	Leeds Rhinos	27	18	1	8	712	507	+205	37	Play-offs
4	Wigan Warriors (C)	27	17	1	9	816	460	+356	35	Play-offs
5	St. Helens	27	15	1	11	678	536	+142	31	Play-offs
6	Hull F.C.	27	13	2	12	652	563	+89	28	Play-offs
7	Catalans Dragons	27	13	2	12	619	604	+15	28	Play-offs
8	Hull Kingston Rovers	27	13	0	14	642	760	−118	26	Play-offs
9	Bradford Bulls	27	10	2	15	640	658	−18	22	
10	Widnes Vikings	27	10	2	15	695	841	−146	22	
11	Wakefield Trinity Wildcats	27	10	1	16	660	749	−89	21	
12	Castleford Tigers	27	9	2	16	702	881	−179	20	
13	London Broncos	27	5	2	20	487	946	−459	12	
14	Salford City Reds	27	6	1	20	436	953	−517	11 (Note: Salford deducted 2 points on 14 June 2013 for fielding 14 players during home game against Castleford)	

Source: superleague.co.uk and BBC Sport
Rules for classification: 1st on competition points; 2nd on match points difference. Competition points: for win = 2; for draw = 1; for loss = 0.
(C) Champions; (L) League Leaders' Shield Winners

== Milestones ==
- Round 1: Brent Webb and Zeb Taia made their debuts for the Dragons.
- Round 1: Brent Webb and Zeb Taia scored their 1st try for the Dragons.
- Round 1: Steve Menzies scored his 25th try and reached 100 points for the Dragons.
- Round 3: Thomas Bosc reached 900 points for the Dragons.
- Round 5: Steve Menzies made his 50th appearance for the Dragons.
- Round 5: Mathias Pala scored his 1st try for the Dragons.
- Round 7: William Barthau scored his 1st try for the Dragons.
- Round 8: Morgan Escaré made his debut for the Dragons.
- Round 8: Thomas Bosc and Jamal Fakir made their 150th appearance for the Dragons.
- Round 8: Éloi Pélissier made his 50th appearance for the Dragons.
- Round 8: Julian Bousquet and Morgan Escaré scored their 1st try for the Dragons.

== Fixtures and results ==
LEGEND
Win
Draw
Loss

2013 Super League

Date	Competition	Rnd	Vrs	H/A	Venue	Result	Score	Tries	Goals	Att	TV	Report
3 February 2013	Super League XVIII	1	Hull Kingston Rovers	A	Craven Park	W	32-24	Menzies (2), Baitieri, Fakir, Taia, Webb	Bosc 4/6	7,864	-	Report
9 February 2013	Super League XVIII	2	Salford City Reds	H	Stade Gilbert Brutus	W	40-6	Duport (2), Casty, Elima, Henderson, Menzies, Millard	Bosc 6/7	6,872	Sky Sports	Report
15 February 2013	Super League XVIII	3	Warrington Wolves	A	Halliwell Jones Stadium	L	16-24	Blanch (2), Taia	Bosc 2/3	10,015	Sky Sports	Report
24 February 2013	Super League XVIII	4	Castleford Tigers	A	Wheldon Road	D	17-17	Anderson, Blanch, Duport	Bosc 2/3, Bosc 1 DG	5,205	-	Report
2 March 2013	Super League XVIII	5	Wakefield Trinity Wildcats	H	Stade Gilbert Brutus	W	29-22	Blanch (2), Baitieri, Mounis, Pala	Bosc 4/6, Bosc 1 DG	7,191	Sky Sports	Report
8 March 2013	Super League XVIII	6	Wigan Warriors	A	DW Stadium	L	0-38	-	-	12,149	-	Report
16 March 2013	Super League XVIII	7	Widnes Vikings	H	Stade Gilbert Brutus	W	46-14	Anderson, Barthau, Blanch, Bosc, Elima, Menzies, Pala, Taia	Bosc 7/8	7,357	Sky Sports	Report
23 March 2013	Super League XVIII	8	Bradford Bulls	H	Stade Gilbert Brutus	W	30-10	Anderson, Bousquet, Escaré, Millard, Pryce, Taia	Bosc 3/6	6,813	Sky Sports	Report
28 March 2013	Super League XVIII	9	London Broncos	A	Molesey Road	W/D/L	Score	Try Scorers	Goal Scorers	Att	TV	Report
1 April 2013	Super League XVIII	10	Leeds Rhinos	H	Stade Gilbert Brutus	W/D/L	Score	Try Scorers	Goal Scorers	Att	TV	Report

Super League Play-offs

Date	Competition	Rnd	Vrs	H/A	Venue	Result	Score	Tries	Goals	Att	TV	Report
14 September 2013	Super League XVII	QSF	Wigan Warriors	A	DW Stadium	W/D/L	Score	Try Scorers	Goal Scorers	Att	TV	Report

== Player appearances ==
- Super League only

FB=Fullback	C=Centre	W=Winger	SO=Stand-off	SH=Scrum half	PR=Prop	H=Hooker	SR=Second Row	L=Loose forward	B=Bench

No	Player	1	2	3	4	5	6	7	8	9	10	11	12	13	14	15	16	17	18	19	20	21	22	23	24	25	26	27	EPO
1	Brent Webb	FB	FB	FB						x	x	x	x	x	x	x	x	x	x	x	x	x	x	x	x	x	x	x	x
2	Damien Blanch	W	W	W	W	W	W	W	W	x	x	x	x	x	x	x	x	x	x	x	x	x	x	x	x	x	x	x	x
3	Leon Pryce	SO	SO	SO	SO	SO	SO	SO	SO	x	x	x	x	x	x	x	x	x	x	x	x	x	x	x	x	x	x	x	x
4	Zeb Taia	SR	SR	SR	SR			SR	SR	x	x	x	x	x	x	x	x	x	x	x	x	x	x	x	x	x	x	x	x
6	Thomas Bosc	SH	SH	SH	SH	SH	SH	FB	SH	x	x	x	x	x	x	x	x	x	x	x	x	x	x	x	x	x	x	x	x
7	Scott Dureau									x	x	x	x	x	x	x	x	x	x	x	x	x	x	x	x	x	x	x	x
8	Olivier Elima	B	B	B	B	SR	SR	B	B	x	x	x	x	x	x	x	x	x	x	x	x	x	x	x	x	x	x	x	x
9	Ian Henderson	H	H	H	H	H	H	H	H	x	x	x	x	x	x	x	x	x	x	x	x	x	x	x	x	x	x	x	x
10	Rémi Casty	P	P	P	P	P	P	P	P	x	x	x	x	x	x	x	x	x	x	x	x	x	x	x	x	x	x	x	x
11	Steve Menzies	C	C	C	C	C	C	C	C	x	x	x	x	x	x	x	x	x	x	x	x	x	x	x	x	x	x	x	x
12	Louis Anderson	SR	SR	SR	SR			SR	SR	x	x	x	x	x	x	x	x	x	x	x	x	x	x	x	x	x	x	x	x
13	Grégory Mounis	B	B		B	B	B	B		x	x	x	x	x	x	x	x	x	x	x	x	x	x	x	x	x	x	x	x
14	William Barthau	x	x	x	x	x	x	SH	x	x	x	x	x	x	x	x	x	x	x	x	x	x	x	x	x	x	x	x	x
15	Antoni Maria	x	x	x	x	B	x	x	x	x	x	x	x	x	x	x	x	x	x	x	x	x	x	x	x	x	x	x	x
16	Éloi Pélissier	B	B	B	B	B	B	B	B	x	x	x	x	x	x	x	x	x	x	x	x	x	x	x	x	x	x	x	x
17	Kevin Larroyer	x	x	B	x	SR	SR	x	x	x	x	x	x	x	x	x	x	x	x	x	x	x	x	x	x	x	x	x	x
18	Daryl Millard	W	W	W	FB	FB	FB	C	C	x	x	x	x	x	x	x	x	x	x	x	x	x	x	x	x	x	x	x	x
19	Mathias Pala	x	x	x	W	W	W	W	W	x	x	x	x	x	x	x	x	x	x	x	x	x	x	x	x	x	x	x	x
20	Mickaël Simon	x	x	B	B	B	P	P	P	x	x	x	x	x	x	x	x	x	x	x	x	x	x	x	x	x	x	x	x
21	Julian Bousquet	P	P	Red card	Red card	Red card	Red card	B	B	x	x	x	x	x	x	x	x	x	x	x	x	x	x	x	x	x	x	x	x
22	Jamal Fakir	B	B	P	P	P	B		B	x	x	x	x	x	x	x	x	x	x	x	x	x	x	x	x	x	x	x	x
23	Lopini Paea									x	x	x	x	x	x	x	x	x	x	x	x	x	x	x	x	x	x	x	x
24	Jason Baitieri	L	L	L	L	L	L	L	L	x	x	x	x	x	x	x	x	x	x	x	x	x	x	x	x	x	x	x	x
25	Vincent Duport	C	C	C	C	C	C			x	x	x	x	x	x	x	x	x	x	x	x	x	x	x	x	x	x	x	x
26	Frédéric Vaccari	x	x	x	x	x	x	x	x	x	x	x	x	x	x	x	x	x	x	x	x	x	x	x	x	x	x	x	x
27	Jean-Philippe Baile	x	x	x	x	x	B	x	x	x	x	x	x	x	x	x	x	x	x	x	x	x	x	x	x	x	x	x	x
28	Morgan Escaré	x	x	x	x	x	x	x	FB	x	x	x	x	x	x	x	x	x	x	x	x	x	x	x	x	x	x	x	x
n/a	Damien Cardace	x	x	x	x	x	x	x	x	x	x	x	x	x	x	x	x	x	x	x	x	x	x	x	x	x	x	x	x
n/a	Elliott Whitehead	x	x	x	x	x	x	x	x	x	x	x	x	x	x	x	x	x	x	x	x	x	x	x	x	x	x	x	x
n/a	Benjamin Garcia	x	x	x	x	x	x	x	x	x	x	x	x	x	x	x	x	x	x	x	x	x	x	x	x	x	x	x	x
n/a	Thibaut Margalet	x	x	x	x	x	x	x	x	x	x	x	x	x	x	x	x	x	x	x	x	x	x	x	x	x	x	x	x

= Injured

= Suspended

== Challenge Cup ==
LEGEND
Win
Draw
Loss

Date	Competition	Rnd	Vrs	H/A	Venue	Result	Score	Tries	Goals	Att	TV	Report
15 April 2013	Cup	4th	Hull Kingston Rovers	A	Craven Park	W/D/L	Score	Try Scorers	Goal Scorers	Att	TV	Report

== Player appearances ==
- Challenge Cup games only

FB=Fullback	C=Centre	W=Winger	SO=Stand Off	SH=Scrum half	P=Prop	H=Hooker	SR=Second Row	L=Loose forward	B=Bench

No	Player	4	5	QF
1	Brent Webb	x	x	x
2	Damien Blanch	x	x	x
3	Leon Pryce	x	x	x
4	Zeb Taia	x	x	x
6	Thomas Bosc	x	x	x
7	Scott Dureau	x	x	x
8	Olivier Elima	x	x	x
9	Ian Henderson	x	x	x
10	Rémi Casty	x	x	x
11	Steve Menzies	x	x	x
12	Louis Anderson	x	x	x
13	Grégory Mounis	x	x	x
14	William Barthau	x	x	x
15	Antoni Maria	x	x	x
16	Éloi Pélissier	x	x	x
17	Kevin Larroyer	x	x	x
18	Daryl Millard	x	x	x
19	Mathias Pala	x	x	x
20	Mickaël Simon	x	x	x
21	Julian Bousquet	x	x	x
22	Jamal Fakir	x	x	x
23	Lopini Paea	x	x	x
24	Jason Baitieri	x	x	x
25	Vincent Duport	x	x	x
26	Frédéric Vaccari	x	x	x
27	Jean-Philippe Baile	x	x	x
28	Morgan Escaré	x	x	x
n/a	Damien Cardace	x	x	x
n/a	Elliott Whitehead	x	x	x
n/a	Benjamin Garcia	x	x	x
n/a	Thibaut Margalet	x	x	x

= Injured

= Suspended

== Squad statistics ==
- Appearances and Points include (Super League, Challenge Cup and play-offs) as of 23 March 2013.

No	Player	Position	Age	Previous club	Apps	Tries	Goals	DG	Points
1	Brent Webb	Fullback	32	Leeds Rhinos	3	1	0	0	4
2	Damien Blanch	Wing	30	Wakefield Trinity Wildcats	8	6	0	0	24
3	Leon Pryce	Stand Off	31	St Helens R.F.C.	8	1	0	0	4
4	Zeb Taia	Second Row	28	Newcastle Knights	6	4	0	0	16
6	Thomas Bosc	Stand Off	30	Catalans Dragons Academy	8	1	28	2	62
7	Scott Dureau	Scrum half	27	Newcastle Knights	0	0	0	0	0
8	Olivier Elima	Second Row	30	Bradford Bulls	8	2	0	0	8
9	Ian Henderson	Hooker	30	New Zealand Warriors	8	1	0	0	4
10	Rémi Casty	Prop	28	Catalans Dragons Academy	8	1	0	0	4
11	Steve Menzies	Second Row	39	Bradford Bulls	8	4	0	0	16
12	Louis Anderson	Second Row	28	Warrington Wolves	6	3	0	0	12
13	Grégory Mounis	Loose forward	28	Catalans Dragons Academy	6	1	0	0	4
14	William Barthau	Stand Off	23	Catalans Dragons Academy	1	1	0	0	4
15	Antoni Maria	Prop	26	Toulouse Olympique	1	0	0	0	0
16	Éloi Pélissier	Hooker	22	Catalans Dragons Academy	8	0	0	0	0
17	Kevin Larroyer	Second Row	24	Toulouse Olympique	3	0	0	0	0
18	Daryl Millard	Centre	28	Wakefield Trinity Wildcats	8	2	0	0	8
19	Mathias Pala	Centre	24	Catalans Dragons Academy	5	2	0	0	8
20	Mickaël Simon	Prop	26	Limoux Grizzlies	6	0	0	0	0
21	Julian Bousquet	Prop	22	Lézignan Sangliers	4	1	0	0	4
22	Jamal Fakir	Prop	31	Villeneuve Leopards	7	1	0	0	4
23	Lopini Paea	Prop	29	Sydney Roosters	0	0	0	0	0
24	Jason Baitieri	Loose forward	24	Sydney Roosters	8	2	0	0	8
25	Vincent Duport	Wing	25	Toulouse Olympique	6	3	0	0	12
26	Frédéric Vaccari	Wing	25	Toulouse Olympique	0	0	0	0	0
27	Jean-Philippe Baile	Centre	26	Rugby Union	1	0	0	0	0
28	Morgan Escaré	Fullback	21	Catalans Dragons Academy	1	1	0	0	4
n/a	Damien Cardace	Wing	20	Lézignan Sangliers	0	0	0	0	0
n/a	David Guasch	Fullback	23	Catalans Dragons Academy	0	0	0	0	0
n/a	Elliott Whitehead	Second Row	24	Bradford Bulls	0	0	0	0	0
n/a	Benjamin Garcia	Loose forward	20	Catalans Dragons Academy	0	0	0	0	0
n/a	Thibaut Margalet	Prop	20	Catalans Dragons Academy	0	0	0	0	0

== Transfers ==
=== In ===
	Name	Position	Signed from	Date
(New Zealand)	Zeb Taia	Second Row	Newcastle Knights	May 2012
(New Zealand)	Brent Webb	Fullback	Leeds Rhinos	September 2012
(France)	Olivier Elima	Second Row	Bradford Bulls	September 2012
(England)	Elliott Whitehead	Second Row	Bradford Bulls	June 2013

=== Out ===
	Name	Position	Club Signed	Date
(Samoa)	Setaimata Sa	Centre	London Irish (Rugby Union)	May 2012
(Australia)	Clint Greenshields	Fullback	North Queensland Cowboys	September 2012
(France)	Sébastien Raguin	Second Row	Released	September 2012
(France)	David Ferriol	Prop	Retirement	September 2012
(France)	Cyril Stacul	Wing	Pia Donkeys	September 2012
(Australia)	Ben Fisher	Hooker	Retirement	October 2012
(France)	Cyrille Gossard	Second Row	Retirement	October 2012
