= 2012 Catalans Dragons season =

- Super League XVII Rank: 4th
- Play-off result: Preliminary Semi Final
- Challenge Cup: Quarter-final
- 2012 record: Wins: 20; draws: 0; losses: 12
- Points scored: For: 948; against: 740

Team information
- Chairman: Bernard Guasch
- Head Coach: Trent Robinson
- Captain: Grégory Mounis
- Stadium: Stade Gilbert Brutus
- Avg. attendance: 9,005
- High attendance: 13,858 vs. Wigan Warriors

Top scorers
- Tries: Vincent Duport & Clint Greenshields (19)
- Goals: Scott Dureau (134)
- Points: Scott Dureau (319)
← 2011	List of seasons	2013 →

This article details the Catalans Dragons rugby league football club's 2012 season. This is their 7th season in the Super League.

== Table ==
Super League XVII
Pos	Team	Pld	W	D	L	PF	PA	PD	Pts	Qualification
1	Wigan Warriors (L)	27	21	0	6	994	449	+545	42	Play-offs
2	Warrington Wolves	27	20	1	6	909	539	+370	41	Play-offs
3	St Helens	27	17	2	8	795	480	+315	36	Play-offs
4	Catalans Dragons	27	18	0	9	812	611	+201	36	Play-offs
5	Leeds Rhinos (C)	27	16	0	11	823	662	+161	32	Play-offs
6	Hull F.C.	27	15	2	10	696	621	+75	32	Play-offs
7	Huddersfield Giants	27	14	0	13	699	664	+35	28	Play-offs
8	Wakefield Trinity Wildcats	27	13	0	14	633	764	−131	26	Play-offs
9	Bradford Bulls	27	14	1	12	633	756	−123	23 (Note: Bradford Bulls deducted 6 points on 25 July 2012 for entering administration)	
10	Hull Kingston Rovers	27	10	1	16	753	729	+24	21	
11	Salford City Reds	27	8	1	18	618	844	−226	17	
12	London Broncos	27	7	0	20	588	890	−302	14	
13	Castleford Tigers	27	6	0	21	554	948	−394	12	
14	Widnes Vikings	27	6	0	21	532	1082	−550	12	

Source: superleague.co.uk and BBC Sport.
Rules for classification: 1st on competition points; 2nd on match points difference.
Competition points: for win = 2; for draw = 1; for loss = 0.
(C) Champions; (L) League Leaders' Shield Winners

== Milestones ==
- Round 1: Louis Anderson and Ben Fisher made their debuts for the Dragons.
- Round 1: Cyrille Gossard made his 50th appearance for the Dragons.
- Round 1: Scott Dureau kicked his 100th goal for the Dragons.
- Round 3: Leon Pryce made his debut for the Dragons.
- Round 6: Leon Pryce scored his 1st try for the Dragons.
- Round 7: Damien Blanch scored his 25th try and reached 100 points for the Dragons.
- Round 8: Grégory Mounis scored his 25th try for the Dragons.
- Round 8: Scott Dureau reached 300 points for the Dragons.
- Round 9: Damien Cardace made his debut for the Dragons.
- Round 9: Damien Cardace scored his 1st try for the Dragons.
- Round 9: Damien Cardace scored his 1st four-try haul and 1st hat-trick for the Dragons.
- Round 9: Clint Greenshields scored his 3rd hat-trick for the Dragons.
- Round 9: Louis Anderson scored his 1st try for the Dragons.
- Round 9: Vincent Duport scored his 25th try and reached 100 points for the Dragons.
- Round 9: Daryl Millard kicked his 1st goal for the Dragons.
- CCR5: Damien Cardace scored his 2nd hat-trick for the Dragons.
- CCQF: Ben Fisher scored his 1st try for the Dragons.
- Round 14: Scott Dureau reached 400 points for the Dragons.
- Round 18: Clint Greenshields scored his 75th try and reached 300 points for the Dragons.
- Round 19: Damien Blanch scored his 2nd hat-trick for the Dragons.
- Round 20: Rémi Casty made his 150th appearance for the Dragons.
- Round 20: Jason Baitieri and Ian Henderson made their 50th appearance for the Dragons.
- Round 2: Julian Bousquet made his debut for the Dragons.
- Round 2: Scott Dureau made his 50th appearance for the Dragons.
- Round 22: Scott Dureau kicked his 200th goal for the Dragons.
- Round 23: Kevin Larroyer made his debut for the Dragons.
- Round 23: Scott Dureau reached 500 points for the Dragons.
- Round 26: Daryl Millard made his 50th appearance for the Dragons.
- Round 26: Antoni Maria made his debut for the Dragons.
- Round 26: Damien Blanch scored his 3rd hat-trick for the Dragons.
- Round 26: Clint Greenshields scored his 4th hat-trick for the Dragons.
- Round 27: Clint Greenshields scored his 5th hat-trick for the Dragons.
- QSF: Damien Blanch made his 50th appearance for the Dragons.

== Fixtures and results ==
LEGEND
Win
Draw
Loss

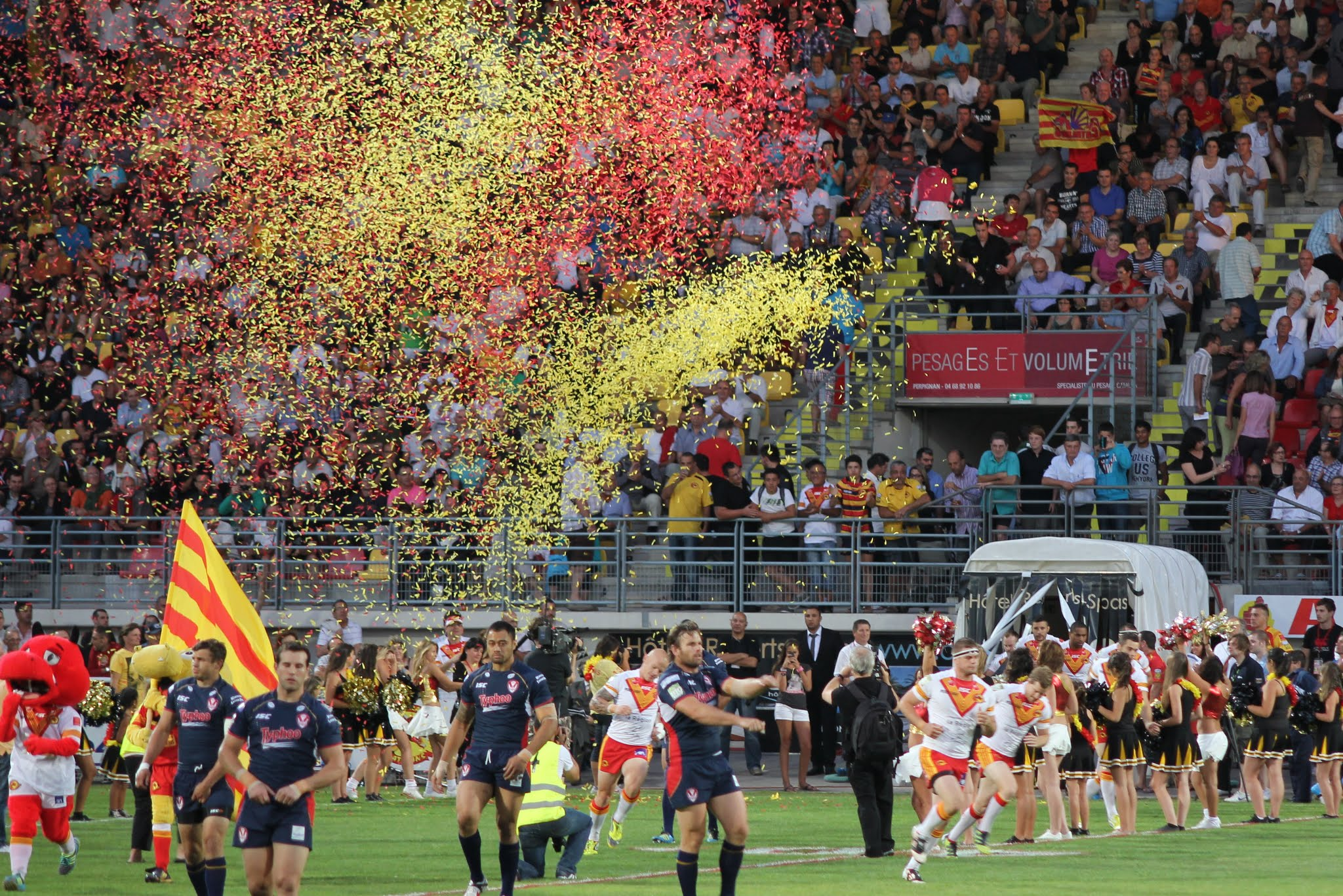
Pre-match before a game against St Helens

2012 Super League

Date	Competition	Rnd	Vrs	H/A	Venue	Result	Score	Tries	Goals	Att	TV	Report
5 February 2012	Super League XVII	1	Bradford Bulls	A	Odsal Stadium	W	34-12	Baitieri, Bosc, Greenshields, Millard, Raguin, Sa	Dureau 5/7	10,610	-	Report
18 February 2012	Super League XVII	3	Castleford Tigers	H	Stade Gilbert Brutus	W	28-20	Millard (2), Baitieri, Bosc, Duport	Dureau 4/5	7,488	-	Report
24 February 2012	Super League XVII	4	St Helens R.F.C.	A	Langtree Park	W	34-32	Blanch, Casty, Duport, Dureau, Millard, Sa	Dureau 5/7	13,108	Sky Sports	Report
4 March 2012	Super League XVII	5	Wigan Warriors	A	DW Stadium	L	12-36	Dureau, Mounis	Dureau 2/2, Bosc 0/1	14,464	-	Report
10 March 2012	Super League XVII	6	Salford City Reds	H	Stade Gilbert Brutus	W	40-18	Blanch (2), Duport (2), Bosc, Dureau, Millard, Pryce	Dureau 4/7, Bosc 0/1	8,158	-	Report
17 March 2012	Super League XVII	7	Hull Kingston Rovers	H	Stade Gilbert Brutus	W	20-12	Blanch, Bosc, Paea	Dureau 4/5	7,337	-	Report
25 March 2012	Super League XVII	8	Wakefield Trinity Wildcats	A	Belle Vue	L	22-32	Duport, Dureau, Greenshields, Mounis	Dureau 3/4	7,254	-	Report
31 March 2012	Super League XVII	9	Widnes Vikings	H	Stade Gilbert Brutus	W	76-6	Cardace (4), Greenshields (3), Anderson, Blanch, Casty, Duport, Millard, Sa	Dureau 11/11, Millard 1/2	9,156	-	Report
5 April 2012	Super League XVII	10	London Broncos	A	Twickenham Stoop	W	36-18	Anderson (2), Duport (2), Dureau, Menzies, Pryce	Dureau 4/7	1,829	-	Report
9 April 2012	Super League XVII	11	Warrington Wolves	H	Stade Gilbert Brutus	W	44-16	Menzies (2), Sa (2), Anderson, Bosc, Millard, Paea	Dureau 5/6, Bosc 1/2	11,500	Sky Sports	Report
20 April 2012	Super League XVII	12	Leeds Rhinos	A	Headingley Stadium	L	18-34	Anderson, Menzies, Pryce	Dureau 3/3	13,282	Sky Sports	Report
5 May 2012	Super League XVII	13	Huddersfield Giants	H	Stade Gilbert Brutus	W	27-20	Cardace, Casty, Duport, Greenshields, Pryce	Dureau 1/3, Bosc 2/2	10,684	-	Report
20 May 2012	Super League XVII	14	Widnes Vikings	A	Halton Stadium	W	42-34	Anderson (2), Bosc, Duport, Dureau, Greenshields, Paea, Pryce	Dureau 5/8	4,684	-	Report
27 May 2012	Magic Weekend	15	London Broncos	N	City of Manchester Stadium	W	42-18	Casty (2), Pryce (2), Fakir, Menzies, Paea	Dureau 7/7	32,953	Sky Sports	Report
1 June 2012	Super League XVII	16	Salford City Reds	A	AJ Bell Stadium	L	30-34	Casty, Duport, Dureau, Millard, Paea, Stacul	Dureau 3/6	5,841	-	Report
9 June 2012	Super League XVII	17	Wigan Warriors	H	Stade de la Mosson	L	14-36	Dureau, Greenshields	Dureau 3/3	13,858	-	Report
22 June 2012	Super League XVII	18	Hull Kingston Rovers	A	Craven Park	W	13-10	Greenshields, Sa	Dureau 2/4, Dureau 1 DG	7,142	Sky Sports	Report
30 June 2012	Super League XVII	19	Wakefield Trinity Wildcats	H	Stade Gilbert Brutus	W	34-10	Blanch (3), Menzies (2), Greenshields	Dureau 5/6	8,842	-	Report
9 July 2012	Super League XVII	20	Warrington Wolves	A	Halliwell Jones Stadium	L	6-15	Baitieri	Dureau 1/1	10,570	Sky Sports	Report
14 July 2012	Super League XVII	2	Hull F.C.	H	Stade Gilbert Brutus	W	44-14	Dureau (2), Greenshields (2), Millard (2), Blanch, Pryce	Dureau 6/8	7,388	-	Report
20 July 2012	Super League XVII	21	St Helens R.F.C.	H	Stade Gilbert Brutus	L	15-20	Duport, Raguin	Dureau 3/3, Dureau 1 DG	10,387	Sky Sports	Report
28 July 2012	Super League XVII	22	London Broncos	H	Stade Gilbert Brutus	W	19-12	Baitieri, Fisher, Millard	Dureau 3/3, Dureau 1 DG	7,662	-	Report
5 August 2012	Super League XVII	23	Huddersfield Giants	A	Galpharm Stadium	L	18-36	Blanch, Casty, Millard	Dureau 3/3	5,822	-	Report
12 August 2012	Super League XVII	24	Hull F.C.	A	KC Stadium	L	10-30	Duport (2)	Dureau 1/2	10,765	-	Report
18 August 2012	Super League XVII	25	Leeds Rhinos	H	Stade Gilbert Brutus	W	38-34	Casty (2), Duport, Dureau, Millard, Sa	Dureau 7/7	10,269	-	Report
2 September 2012	Super League XVII	26	Castleford Tigers	A	Wheldon Road	W	46-26	Blanch (3), Greenshields (3), Duport, Sa	Dureau 7/8	5,005	-	Report
8 September 2012	Super League XVII	27	Bradford Bulls	H	Stade Gilbert Brutus	W	50-26	Greenshields (3), Anderson, Duport, Dureau, Menzies, Millard, Sa	Dureau 7/8, Bosc 0/1	9,254	Sky Sports	Report

Super League Play-offs

Date	Competition	Rnd	Vrs	H/A	Venue	Result	Score	Tries	Goals	Att	TV	Report
14 September 2012	Super League XVII	QSF	Wigan Warriors	A	DW Stadium	L	6-46	Anderson	Dureau 1/1	7,232	Sky Sports	Report
21 September 2012	Super League XVII	PSF	Leeds Rhinos	H	Stade Gilbert Brutus	L	20-27	Blanch (2), Bosc, Greenshields	Dureau 2/4	11,523	Sky Sports	Report

== Player appearances ==
- Super League only

FB=Fullback	C=Centre	W=Winger	SO=Stand-off	SH=Scrum half	PR=Prop	H=Hooker	SR=Second Row	L=Loose forward	B=Bench

No	Player	1	3	4	5	6	7	8	9	10	11	12	13	14	15	16	17	18	19	20	2	21	22	23	24	25	26	27	QSF	PSF
1	Clint Greenshields	FB	FB	FB	FB			W	FB	FB	FB		FB	FB	FB		FB	W	FB	FB	FB				FB	FB	FB	FB	FB	FB
2	Damien Blanch		W	W	W	W	W		W	W							W	W	W	W	W	W	W	W	W	W	W	W	W	W
3	Leon Pryce		SO	SO	B	SO	SO	SO	SO	SO	SO	SO	SO	SO	SO	SO	SO	FB	SO	SO	SO	SO	SO	SO	SO	SO				B
4	Setaimata Sa	SO	SR	SR	SR			SR	SR	SR	C	L	SR				C	SR							B	SR	SR	C	C	C
5	Cyril Stacul											W	x	x	W	W	x	x	x	x	x	FB	FB	FB	x	x	x	x	x	x
6	Thomas Bosc	W	W	W	SO	FB	FB	FB		W	W		W	W	W	FB		SO									SO	SO	SO	SO
7	Scott Dureau	SH	SH	SH	SH	SH	SH	SH	SH	SH	SH	SH	SH	SH	SH	SH	SH	SH	SH	SH	SH	SH	SH	SH	SH	SH	SH	SH	SH	SH
8	David Ferriol	B	B	B	B	P	P	B	B	x	B					B	P	P	P	P			P	P	P	P		P		P
9	Ian Henderson	H	H	H	H				H	B	H	H	H	H	B	B	H	H	H	H		H		B	H	H	H	H	H	H
10	Rémi Casty	P	P	P	P	P	P	P	P	P	P	P	P	P	P	P	P	P	P	P	P	P	SR	SR	P	P	P	SR	P	P
11	Steve Menzies	B	B	SR						B	SR	SR	SR	C	SR	SR	SR	SR	SR	SR	SR	SR						B	SR	SR
12	Louis Anderson	SR			SR				B	SR	SR	SR	B	SR	SR	SR	SR								SR	SR	SR	SR	SR	SR
13	Grégory Mounis			B	B	B	B	B		L	B					B	B	B	B	B	B	B	B	B	B	B	P	B	B	B
14	Sébastien Raguin	C	SR	B	x	SR	SR	SR	x	x	x	C	x	SR	B	B	B	B	B	B	SR	SR	SR	SR	SR	B		P	B	x
15	Jean-Philippe Baile	x	x	x	C	C	C	C	x	x	x	x	x	x	x	C	x	x	x	x	x	x	B	x	x	x	x	x	x	x
16	Éloi Pélissier						B	B	B		B		B						B	B	B	B	B		B	B	B	B	B	
17	Cyrille Gossard	SR	x	x	x	B	B	x	x	x	x	x	x	x	x	x	x	x	x	x	x	x	B	x	x	x	x	x	x	x
18	Daryl Millard	W	C	C	W	W	W	W	C	C	C	FB	C			W	W	C	W	C	C	C	C	C	C	C	C	W	W	W
19	Frédéric Vaccari																													
20	Mickaël Simon	x	x	x	x	B	B	x	P	B	x	B	B	B	B	x	x	x	x	x	x	x	x	x	x	x	x	x	x	x
21	Julian Bousquet	x	x	x	x	x	x	x	x	x	x	x	x	x	x	x	x	x	x	x	B	B	x	x	x	x	x	x	x	x
22	Jamal Fakir	B	B	B	B	B		B	B	B	B	B	B	B	B			B	B	B	B	B		B	B	B	B	B	B	B
23	Lopini Paea	P	P	P	P	SR	SR	P	SR	P	P	P	P	P	P	P	B		SR	SR	P	P	P	P					P	B
24	Jason Baitieri	L	L	L	L	L	L	L	L		L	B	L	L	L	L	L	L	L	L	L	L	L	L	L	L	L	L	L	L
25	Vincent Duport	C	C	C	C	C	C	C	C	C	W	C	C	C	C	C	C	C	C	C	C	C	C	C	C	C	C	C	C	C
26	Ben Fisher	B	B			H	H	H		H		B			H	H	B	B			H		H	H						
27	William Barthau	x	x	x	x	x	x	x	x	x	x	x	x	B	x	x	x	x	x	x	x	x	x	x	x	x	x	x	x	x
28	Damien Cardace	x	x	x	x	x	x	x	W	x	x	W	W	W	x	x	x	x	x	W	x	W	W	W	W	x	x	x	x	x
29	Mathias Pala	x	x	x	x	x	x	x	x	x	x	x	x	B	C	x	x	x	C	x	W	x	x	x	x	W	W	x	x	x
31	Antoni Maria	x	x	x	x	x	x	x	x	x	x	x	x	x	x	x	x	x	x	x	x	x	x	x	x	x	B	x	x	x
32	Kevin Larroyer	x	x	x	x	x	x	x	x	x	x	x	x	x	x	x	x	x	x	x	x	x	x	B	x	x	B	x	x	x

= Injured

= Suspended

== Challenge Cup ==
LEGEND
Win
Draw
Loss

Date	Competition	Rnd	Vrs	H/A	Venue	Result	Score	Tries	Goals	Att	TV	Report
15 April 2012	Cup	4th	Hull Kingston Rovers	A	Craven Park	W	20-18	Pryce (2), Henderson	Dureau 4/4	4,425	-	Report
28 April 2012	Cup	5th	Sheffield Eagles	H	Stade Gilbert Brutus	W	68-6	Cardace (3), Bosc (2), Pryce (2), Pélissier (2), Duport, Menzies, Stacul	Dureau 10/12	3,102	-	Report
13 May 2012	Cup	QF	Warrington Wolves	H	Stade Gilbert Brutus	L	22-32	Duport, Fisher, Paea, Simon	Dureau 3/4	7,476	BBC Sport	Report

== Player appearances ==
- Challenge Cup games only

FB=Fullback	C=Centre	W=Winger	SO=Stand Off	SH=Scrum half	P=Prop	H=Hooker	SR=Second Row	L=Loose forward	B=Bench

No	Player	4	5	QF
1	Clint Greenshields	x		FB
2	Damien Blanch	x		
3	Leon Pryce	SO	SO	SO
4	Setaimata Sa	C	SR	
5	Cyril Stacul	W	W	
6	Thomas Bosc	x	FB	W
7	Scott Dureau	SH	SH	SH
8	David Ferriol	B	P	
9	Ian Henderson	H	H	H
10	Rémi Casty	P	B	P
11	Steve Menzies	B	SR	SR
12	Louis Anderson	SR	x	SR
13	Grégory Mounis	x		
14	Sébastien Raguin	x	B	B
15	Jean-Philippe Baile	x	x	x
16	Éloi Pélissier	B	B	x
17	Cyrille Gossard	x	x	x
18	Daryl Millard	FB	C	C
19	Frédéric Vaccari			
20	Mickaël Simon	P	P	B
21	Julian Bousquet	x	x	x
22	Jamal Fakir	B	B	B
23	Lopini Paea	SR	x	P
24	Jason Baitieri	L	L	L
25	Vincent Duport	C	C	C
26	Ben Fisher	x	x	B
27	William Barthau	x	x	x
28	Damien Cardace	W	W	W
29	Mathias Pala	x	x	x
31	Antoni Maria	x	x	x
32	Kevin Larroyer	x	x	x

= Injured

= Suspended

== Squad statistics ==
- Appearances and Points include (Super League, Challenge Cup and play-offs) as of 21 September 2012.

No	Player	Position	Age	Previous club	Apps	Tries	Goals	DG	Points
1	Clint Greenshields	Fullback	30	St George Illawarra Dragons	23	19	0	0	76
2	Damien Blanch	Wing	29	Wakefield Trinity Wildcats	21	15	0	0	60
3	Leon Pryce	Stand off	30	St Helens R.F.C.	28	12	0	0	48
4	Setaimata Sa	Centre	24	Sydney Roosters	20	9	0	0	36
5	Cyril Stacul	Wing	27	Catalans Dragons Academy	8	2	0	0	8
6	Thomas Bosc	Stand off	29	Catalans Dragons Academy	20	9	3	0	42
7	Scott Dureau	Scrum half	26	Newcastle Knights	32	12	134	3	319
8	David Ferriol	Prop	33	Limoux Grizzlies	22	0	0	0	0
9	Ian Henderson	Hooker	29	New Zealand Warriors	27	1	0	0	4
10	Rémi Casty	Prop	27	Catalans Dragons Academy	32	9	0	0	36
11	Steve Menzies	Second row	38	Bradford Bulls	22	9	0	0	36
12	Louis Anderson	Second row	27	Warrington Wolves	19	9	0	0	36
13	Grégory Mounis	Loose forward	27	Catalans Dragons Academy	22	2	0	0	8
14	Sébastien Raguin	Second row	33	Toulouse Olympique	24	2	0	0	8
15	Jean-Philippe Baile	Centre	25	Rugby Union	6	0	0	0	0
16	Éloi Pélissier	Hooker	21	Catalans Dragons Academy	17	2	0	0	8
17	Cyrille Gossard	Second row	30	Catalans Dragons Academy	4	0	0	0	0
18	Daryl Millard	Centre	27	Wakefield Trinity Wildcats	30	14	1	0	58
19	Frédéric Vaccari	Wing	24	Toulouse Olympique	0	0	0	0	0
20	Mickaël Simon	Prop	25	Limoux Grizzlies	11	1	0	0	4
21	Julian Bousquet	Prop	21	Lézignan Sangliers	2	0	0	0	0
22	Jamal Fakir	Prop	30	Villeneuve Leopards	28	1	0	0	4
23	Lopini Paea	Prop	28	Sydney Roosters	26	6	0	0	24
24	Jason Baitieri	Loose forward	23	Sydney Roosters	31	4	0	0	16
25	Vincent Duport	Wing	24	Toulouse Olympique	32	19	0	0	76
26	Ben Fisher	Hooker	31	Batley Bulldogs	15	2	0	0	8
27	William Barthau	Stand off	22	Catalans Dragons Academy	1	0	0	0	0
28	Damien Cardace	Wing	19	Lézignan Sangliers	12	8	0	0	32
29	Mathias Pala	Centre	23	Catalans Dragons Academy	6	0	0	0	0
31	Antoni Maria	Prop	25	Toulouse Olympique	1	0	0	0	0
32	Kevin Larroyer	Second row	23	Toulouse Olympique	2	0	0	0	0
n/a	David Guasch	Fullback	22	Catalans Dragons Academy	0	0	0	0	0

== Transfers ==
=== In ===
	Name	Position	Signed from	Date
(New Zealand)	Louis Anderson	Second row	Warrington Wolves	July 2011
(France)	Julian Bousquet	Prop	Lézignan Sangliers	July 2011
(France)	Damien Cardace	Wing	Lézignan Sangliers	July 2011
(England)	Leon Pryce	Stand off	St Helens R.F.C.	August 2011
(France)	Antoni Maria	Prop	Toulouse Olympique	August 2011
(France)	Kevin Larroyer	Second row	Toulouse Olympique	August 2011
(Australia)	Ben Fisher	Hooker	Batley Bulldogs (Loan)	January 2012
(Australia)	Ben Fisher	Hooker	Batley Bulldogs	May 2012

=== Out ===
	Name	Position	Club Signed	Date
(Australia)	Ben Farrar	Centre	Manly-Warringah Sea Eagles	August 2011
(France)	Thibaut Ancely	Second row	Released	November 2011
(France)	Tony Gigot	Stand off	Sporting Olympique Avignon	November 2011
(France)	Sébastien Martins	Second row	Toulouse Olympique	November 2011
(France)	Julien Touxagas	Second row	Released	November 2011
(France)	Rémy Marginet	Scrum half	Released	November 2011
