= 2011 Catalans Dragons season =

- Super League XVI Rank: 6th
- Play-off result: Playoff Semi Final
- Challenge Cup: 5th Round
- 2011 record: Wins: 17; draws: 1; losses: 13
- Points scored: For: 783; against: 722

Team information
- Chairman: Bernard Guasch
- Head Coach: Trent Robinson
- Captain: Grégory Mounis
- Stadium: Stade Gilbert Brutus
- Avg. attendance: 8,401
- High attendance: 10,688 vs. Leeds Rhinos

Top scorers
- Tries: Damien Blanch (21)
- Goals: Scott Dureau (95)
- Points: Scott Dureau (239)
← 2010	List of seasons	2012 →

This article details the Catalans Dragons rugby league football club's 2011 season. This is their 6th season in the Super League.

== Table ==
Pos	Team	Pld	W	D	L	PF	PA	PD	Pts	Qualification
1	Warrington Wolves (L)	27	22	0	5	1072	401	+671	44	Play-offs
2	Wigan Warriors	27	20	3	4	852	432	+420	43	Play-offs
3	St Helens	27	17	3	7	782	515	+267	37	Play-offs
4	Huddersfield Giants	27	16	0	11	707	524	+183	32	Play-offs
5	Leeds Rhinos (C)	27	15	1	11	757	603	+154	31	Play-offs
6	Catalans Dragons	27	15	1	11	689	626	+63	31	Play-offs
7	Hull Kingston Rovers	27	14	0	13	713	692	+21	28	Play-offs
8	Hull F.C.	27	13	1	13	718	569	+149	27	Play-offs
9	Castleford Tigers	27	12	2	13	664	808	−144	26	
10	Bradford Bulls	27	9	2	16	570	826	−256	20	
11	Salford City Reds	27	10	0	17	542	809	−267	20	
12	Harlequins	27	6	1	20	524	951	−427	13	
13	Wakefield Trinity Wildcats	27	7	0	20	453	957	−504	10 (Note: Wakefield deducted 4 points for entering administration.)	
14	Crusaders	27	6	0	21	527	857	−330	8 (Note: Crusaders deducted 4 points for entering administration.)	

Source: rugbyleagueproject.org
Rules for classification: 1) Points; 2) Points difference; 3) Number of points scored;
(C) Champions; (L) League Leaders' Shield winners

== Milestones ==
- Round 1: Damien Blanch, Ben Farrar, Scott Dureau, Lopini Paea, Ian Henderson and Steve Menzies made their debuts for the Dragons.
- Round 1: Damien Blanch scored his 1st try for the Dragons.
- Round 2: Éloi Pélissier made his debut for the Dragons.
- Round 2: Scott Dureau kicked his 1st goal for the Dragons.
- Round 3: David Ferriol made his 100th appearance for the Dragons.
- Round 3: Daryl Millard and Jason Baitieri made their debuts for the Dragons.
- Round 3: Steve Menzies scored his 1st try for the Dragons.
- Round 3: Scott Dureau kicked his 1st drop goal for the Dragons.
- Round 4: Scott Dureau scored his 1st try for the Dragons.
- Round 6: Clint Greenshields scored his 2nd hat-trick for the Dragons.
- Round 6: Ben Farrar scored his 1st try for the Dragons.
- Round 8: Daryl Millard scored his 1st try for the Dragons.
- Round 9: Cyril Stacul made his 50th appearance for the Dragons.
- Round 10: Ian Henderson scored his 1st try for the Dragons.
- Round 11: Jean-Philippe Baile made his 50th appearance for the Dragons.
- Round 11: Jason Baitieri scored his 1st try for the Dragons.
- Round 11: Éloi Pélissier scored his 1st try for the Dragons.
- Round 11: Scott Dureau reached 100 points for the Dragons.
- Round 12: Mathias Pala made his debut for the Dragons.
- Round 13: Jamal Fakir made his 100th appearance for the Dragons.
- Round 15: Grégory Mounis made his 150th appearance for the Dragons.
- Round 15: Sébastien Raguin made his 100th appearance for the Dragons.
- Round 21: Thibaut Ancely made his debut for the Dragons.
- Round 21: Sébastien Raguin scored his 25th try and reached 100 points for the Dragons.
- Round 22: Rémy Marginet made his debut for the Dragons.
- Round 22: Rémy Marginet kicked his 1st goal for the Dragons.
- Round 23: Vincent Duport made his 50th appearance for the Dragons.
- Round 23: Mickaël Simon scored his 1st try for the Dragons.
- Round 25: Scott Dureau reached 200 points for the Dragons.
- EPO: Damien Blanch scored his 1st hat-trick for the Dragons.

== Fixtures and results ==
LEGEND
Win
Draw
Loss

2011 Super League

Date	Competition	Rnd	Vrs	H/A	Venue	Result	Score	Tries	Goals	Att	TV	Report
12 February 2011	Magic Weekend	1	Harlequins RL	N	Millennium Stadium	L	4-11	Blanch	Dureau 0/1	30,891	Sky Sports	Report
19 February 2011	Super League XVI	2	Wakefield Trinity Wildcats	H	Stade Gilbert Brutus	L	14-38	Raguin, Stacul	Dureau 3/3	7,500	-	Report
27 February 2011	Super League XVI	3	Hull Kingston Rovers	A	Craven Park	W	31-18	Blanch (2), Menzies, Mounis, Raguin, Sa	Dureau 3/6, Dureau 1 DG	8,092	-	Report
5 March 2011	Super League XVI	4	St Helens R.F.C.	H	Stade Gilbert Brutus	L	16-22	Dureau, Menzies, Sa	Dureau 2/3	7,095	-	Report
12 March 2011	Super League XVI	5	Castleford Tigers	A	Wheldon Road	L	24-34	Dureau (2), Blanch, Stacul	Dureau 4/4	4,889	Sky Sports	Report
18 March 2011	Super League XVI	6	Crusaders RL	A	Racecourse Ground	W	32-22	Greenshields (3), Farrar (2)	Dureau 6/7	3,517	-	Report
26 March 2011	Super League XVI	7	Salford City Reds	H	Stade Gilbert Brutus	L	10-22	Raguin, Stacul	Gigot 1/2	7,156	-	Report
3 April 2011	Super League XVI	8	Warrington Wolves	A	Halliwell Jones Stadium	W	22-20	Dureau, Ferriol, Millard, Vaccari	Dureau 3/4	10,956	-	Report
8 April 2011	Super League XVI	9	Wigan Warriors	A	DW Stadium	W	47-28	Dureau (2), Menzies (2), Vaccari (2), Blanch, Casty	Dureau 7/8, Dureau 1 DG	13,134	-	Report
16 April 2011	Super League XVI	10	Hull F.C.	H	Stade Gilbert Brutus	W	28-10	Baile, Blanch, Henderson, Menzies, Vaccari	Dureau 4/5	8,025	-	Report
22 April 2011	Super League XVI	11	Harlequins RL	A	Twickenham Stoop	W	37-30	Dureau (2), Stacul (2), Baitieri, Pélissier	Dureau 5/6, Mounis 1/1, Dureau 1 DG	2,069	-	Report
25 April 2011	Super League XVI	12	Bradford Bulls	H	Stade Gilbert Brutus	D	8-8	Farrar	Dureau 2/2	9,496	Sky Sports	Report
30 April 2011	Super League XVI	13	Huddersfield Giants	H	Stade Gilbert Brutus	W	13-12	Baitieri, Ferriol	Dureau 2/2, Dureau 1 DG	7,825	-	Report
13 May 2011	Super League XVI	14	Leeds Rhinos	A	Headingley Stadium	L	6-30	Henderson	Bosc 1/1	13,273	-	Report
29 May 2011	Super League XVI	15	Wakefield Trinity Wildcats	A	Belle Vue	W	42-22	Blanch (2), Vaccari (2), Baile, Greenshields, Mounis, Sa	Dureau 5/8	4,561	-	Report
4 June 2011	Super League XVI	16	Wigan Warriors	H	Stade Yves-du-Manoir	W	20-12	Millard (2), Baile	Dureau 4/4	9,372	-	Report
11 June 2011	Super League XVI	17	Crusaders RL	H	Stade Gilbert Brutus	W	31-18	Blanch (2), Baile, Millard, Sa	Dureau 5/5, Dureau 1 DG	7,125	-	Report
18 June 2011	Super League XVI	18	Huddersfield Giants	A	Galpharm Stadium	L	20-28	Baile, Baitieri, Blanch, Dureau	Dureau 2/4	5,132	Sky Sports	Report
25 June 2011	Super League XVI	19	Castleford Tigers	H	Stade Gilbert Brutus	W	54-20	Paea (2), Vaccari (2), Baile, Baitieri, Blanch, Dureau, Greenshields, Menzies	Dureau 7/10	8,695	-	Report
2 July 2011	Super League XVI	20	Bradford Bulls	A	Odsal Stadium	W	34-28	Blanch (2), Greenshields (2), Dureau, Henderson, Raguin	Dureau 3/7	12,670	Sky Sports	Report
10 July 2011	Super League XVI	21	Leeds Rhinos	H	Stade Gilbert Brutus	W	38-18	Vaccari (2), Blanch, Duport, Greenshields, Menzies, Raguin	Dureau 5/7	10,688	Sky Sports	Report
15 July 2011	Super League XVI	22	St Helens R.F.C.	A	Halton Stadium	L	18-40	Menzies (2), Greenshields, Vaccari	Marginet 1/4	7,076	-	Report
30 July 2011	Super League XVI	23	Harlequins RL	H	Stade Gilbert Brutus	W	48-22	Greenshields (2), Mounis (2), Baile, Baitieri, Blanch, Simon	Marginet 8/8	8,471	-	Report
12 August 2011	Super League XVI	24	Hull F.C.	A	KC Stadium	L	8-40	Duport, Millard	Dureau 0/2	10,739	-	Report
20 August 2011	Super League XVI	25	Warrington Wolves	H	Stade Gilbert Brutus	L	12-25	Blanch, Menzies	Dureau 2/3	9,495	-	Report
3 September 2011	Super League XVI	26	Hull Kingston Rovers	H	Stade Gilbert Brutus	L	28-30	Millard (2), Baile, Raguin, Sa	Dureau 4/6	8,252	-	Report
11 September 2011	Super League XVI	27	Salford City Reds	A	The Willows	W	44-18	Menzies (2), Sa (2), Bosc, Henderson, Paea	Dureau 6/6, Bosc 2/2	10,146	-	Report

Super League Play-offs

Date	Competition	Rnd	Vrs	H/A	Venue	Result	Score	Tries	Goals	Att	TV	Report
17 September 2011	Super League XVI	EPO	Hull Kingston Rovers	H	Stade Gilbert Brutus	W	56-6	Blanch (3), Menzies (2), Greenshields, Millard, Pélissier, Raguin, Stacul	Dureau 8/11	8,413	Sky Sports	Report
25 September 2011	Super League XVI	PSF	Wigan Warriors	A	DW Stadium	L	0-44	-	-	6,790	Sky Sports	Report

== Player appearances ==
- Super League only

FB=Fullback	C=Centre	W=Winger	SO=Stand-off	SH=Scrum half	PR=Prop	H=Hooker	SR=Second Row	L=Loose forward	B=Bench

No	Player	1	2	3	4	5	6	7	8	9	10	11	12	13	14	15	16	17	18	19	20	21	22	23	24	25	26	27	EPO	PSF
1	Clint Greenshields	FB				FB	FB	FB	FB							FB	FB	FB	FB	FB	FB	FB	FB	FB	FB	FB	FB	FB	FB	FB
2	Damien Blanch	W	W	W	W	W	W	W		W	W	W	W	W	W	W	W	W	W	W	W	W	W	W	W	W	W	W	W	W
3	Ben Farrar	C	FB	FB	FB	C	C	C	SO	SO	SO	SO	FB	C																
4	Setaimata Sa	C	C	C	SR	SO	SO	SO		C	C	C	SR		SO	SO	SO	SO	SO	SO				SO	SO	SO	SR	C		C
5	Cyril Stacul	W	W	W	W	W	W	W	W	FB	FB	FB	W	FB	FB														W	W
6	Thomas Bosc												SO	SO	SH													SO	SO	SO
7	Scott Dureau	SH	SH	SH	SH	SH	SH		SH	SH	SH	SH	SH	SH		SH	SH	SH	SH	SH	SH	SH			SH	SH	SH	SH	SH	SH
8	David Ferriol	P	P	P	P	B		B	P	P	P	P		P	P	P	P	P	P	P	P	Red card	Red card	Red card	P	P	P	P	P	
9	Ian Henderson	B	H	H	H	H	H	H	H	H	H	H	H	H	H	H	H	B	H	H	H	H	H	H	H	H	H	H	H	H
10	Rémi Casty	B	P	P	P	B	P	P	P	P	P	P	P	SR						B	B	P	P	P	B	P	P	SR	SR	SR
11	Steve Menzies	B	SR	SR	SR	SR	SR	SR	SR	SR	SR	SR					B	SR	SR	SR	SO	SO	SO			SR	SO	SR	SR	SR
12	Sébastien Raguin	SR	SR	SR	C	SR	SR	SR	SR	SR	SR	SR	SR	SR	SR	SR	SR	SR	SR		SR	SR	SR	SR	SR	SR	SR	B	B	B
13	Grégory Mounis	L	L	L	L	B	L	L	L	L	L	L	L	L	SR	L	L	L	L	L	L	L	L	L	L	L	L	L	L	L
14	Tony Gigot	SO	SO	SO	SO	B	x	SH	x	x	– (Note: On loan at Toulouse Olympique)				B	x	x	x	x	x	x	x	x	x	x	x	x	x	x	x
15	Jean-Philippe Baile	H	C	x	x	x	B	B	C	x	C	C	C	C	C	C	C	C	C	C	C	x	C	C	C	C	C		C	
16	William Barthau	x	x	x	x	x	x	x	x	x	x	x	x	x	– (Note: On loan at Dewsbury Rams)								x	x	x	x	x	x	x	x
17	Cyrille Gossard	SR	B	x	x	x	B															B	B	B	B	x	x	x	x	x
18	Daryl Millard	– (Note: Was at Wakefield Wildcats)	x	C	C	C	C	C	C	C						C	C	C	C	C	C	C	C	C	C	C	C	C	C	C
19	Frédéric Vaccari	x	x	x	x	x	x	x	W	W	W	W	x	W	W	W	W	W	W	W	W	W	W	x	x	W	W	W	x	x
20	Mickaël Simon	x	x	x	x	x	B	B	B	B	B	B	P	B	B	B	B	B	B	B	x	B	B	B	B	x	x	x	x	B
21	Sébastien Martins	x	x	x	x	x	x	x	B	B	B	B	B	x	B	B	x	x	x	x	B	x	x	x	x	x	x	x	x	x
22	Jamal Fakir	B	B	B	B	P	P	P					B	P	P	P	B	B	B	P	P		B			B	B	B	B	P
23	Lopini Paea	P	B	B	B	P										SR	SR	B	P	SR	SR	SR	SR	SR	SR	B	B	P	P	P
24	Jason Baitieri	x	x	B	B	L	B	B	B	B	B	B	B	B	L	B	P	P	B	B	B	P	P	P	P	B	B	B	B	B
25	Vincent Duport	– (Note: Was at Toulouse Olympique)																				C	x	W	W	x	x	x	x	x
26	Éloi Pélissier	x	B	B	B	x	x	x	B	B	B	B	B	B	x	B	B	H	B	B	B	B	B	B	B	B	B	B	B	B
27	Mathias Pala	x	x	x	x	x	x	x	x	x	x	x	C	x	C	x	x	x	x	x	x	x	x	x	x	x	x	x	x	x
28	Julien Touxagas	x	x	x	x	x	x	x	x	x	x	x	x	B	B	x	x	x	x	x	x	x	x	x	x	x	x	x	x	x
29	Rémy Marginet	x	x	x	x	x	x	x	x	x	x	x	x	x	x	x	x	x	x	x	x	x	SH	SH	x	x	x	x	x	x
30	Thibaut Ancely	x	x	x	x	x	x	x	x	x	x	x	x	x	x	– (Note: On loan at Toulouse Olympique)					x	B	x	B	– (Note: On loan at Toulouse Olympique)					

= Injured

= Suspended

== Challenge Cup ==
LEGEND
Win
Draw
Loss

Date	Competition	Rnd	Vrs	H/A	Venue	Result	Score	Tries	Goals	Att	TV	Report
6 May 2011	Cup	4th	Leigh Centurions	A	Leigh Sports Village	W	22-16	Baile, Blanch, Henderson, Stacul	Dureau 1/3, Bosc 2/2	2,237	-	Report
22 May 2011	Cup	5th	Huddersfield Giants	A	Galpharm Stadium	L	16-30	Baile, Henderson, Stacul	Dureau 2/3	3,098	-	Report

== Player appearances ==
- Challenge Cup games only

FB=Fullback	C=Centre	W=Winger	SO=Stand Off	SH=Scrum half	P=Prop	H=Hooker	SR=Second Row	L=Loose forward	B=Bench

No	Player	4	5
1	Clint Greenshields		
2	Damien Blanch	W	W
3	Ben Farrar	C	
4	Setaimata Sa		SR
5	Cyril Stacul	FB	FB
6	Thomas Bosc	SO	SO
7	Scott Dureau	SH	SH
8	David Ferriol	P	P
9	Ian Henderson	B	H
10	Rémi Casty	SR	
11	Steve Menzies		
12	Sébastien Raguin	SR	SR
13	Grégory Mounis	L	B
14	Tony Gigot	– (Note: On loan at Toulouse Olympique)	B
15	Jean-Philippe Baile	C	C
16	William Barthau	x	– (Note: On loan at Dewsbury Rams)
17	Cyrille Gossard		
18	Daryl Millard		C
19	Frédéric Vaccari	W	W
20	Mickaël Simon	P	B
21	Sébastien Martins	x	x
22	Jamal Fakir	B	P
23	Lopini Paea		L
24	Jason Baitieri	B	B
25	Vincent Duport	– (Note: Was at Toulouse Olympique)	
26	Éloi Pélissier	H	x
27	Mathias Pala	x	x
28	Julien Touxagas	B	x
29	Rémy Marginet	x	x
30	Thibaut Ancely	x	x

= Injured

= Suspended

== Squad statistics ==
- Appearances and Points include (Super League, Challenge Cup and play-offs) as of 25 September 2011.

No	Player	Position	Age	Previous club	Apps	Tries	Goals	DG	Points
1	Clint Greenshields	Fullback	29	St George Illawarra Dragons	20	12	0	0	48
2	Damien Blanch	Wing	28	Wakefield Trinity Wildcats	30	21	0	0	84
3	Ben Farrar	Centre	24	Manly Warringah Sea Eagles	14	3	0	0	12
4	Setaimata Sa	Centre	23	Sydney Roosters	24	7	0	0	28
5	Cyril Stacul	Wing	26	Catalans Dragons Academy	18	8	0	0	32
6	Thomas Bosc	Stand off	28	Catalans Dragons Academy	8	1	5	0	14
7	Scott Dureau	Scrum half	25	Newcastle Knights	27	11	95	5	239
8	David Ferriol	Prop	32	Limoux Grizzlies	25	2	0	0	8
9	Ian Henderson	Hooker	28	New Zealand Warriors	31	6	0	0	24
10	Rémi Casty	Prop	26	Catalans Dragons Academy	25	1	0	0	4
11	Steve Menzies	Second row	37	Bradford Bulls	23	14	0	0	56
12	Sébastien Raguin	Second-row	32	Toulouse Olympique	30	7	0	0	28
13	Grégory Mounis	Loose forward	26	Catalans Dragons Academy	31	4	1	0	18
14	Tony Gigot	Stand off	20	Catalans Dragons Academy	8	0	1	0	2
15	Jean-Philippe Baile	Centre	24	Rugby Union	24	10	0	0	40
16	William Barthau	Stand off	21	Catalans Dragons Academy	0	0	0	0	0
17	Cyrille Gossard	Second row	29	Catalans Dragons Academy	7	0	0	0	0
18	Daryl Millard	Centre	26	Wakefield Trinity Wildcats	23	8	0	0	32
19	Frédéric Vaccari	Wing	23	Toulouse Olympique	19	11	0	0	44
20	Mickaël Simon	Prop	24	Limoux Grizzlies	21	1	0	0	4
21	Sébastien Martins	Second row	26	Pia Donkeys	8	0	0	0	0
22	Jamal Fakir	Prop	29	Villeneuve Leopards	24	0	0	0	0
23	Lopini Paea	Prop	27	Sydney Roosters	21	3	0	0	12
24	Jason Baitieri	Loose forward	22	Sydney Roosters	29	5	0	0	20
25	Vincent Duport	Wing	23	Toulouse Olympique	3	2	0	0	8
26	Éloi Pélissier	Hooker	20	Catalans Dragons Academy	25	2	0	0	8
27	Mathias Pala	Centre	22	Catalans Dragons Academy	2	0	0	0	0
28	Julien Touxagas	Second row	27	Catalans Dragons Academy	3	0	0	0	0
29	Rémy Marginet	Scrum half	22	Catalans Dragons Academy	2	0	9	0	18
30	Thibaut Ancely	Second row	23	Lézignan Sangliers	2	0	0	0	0
n/a	David Guasch	Fullback	21	Catalans Dragons Academy	0	0	0	0	0

== Transfers ==
=== In ===
	Name	Position	Signed from	Date
(Australia)	Scott Dureau	Scrum half	Newcastle Knights	August 2010
(Australia)	Ian Henderson	Hooker	New Zealand Warriors	August 2010
(France)	Jason Baitieri	Loose forward	Sydney Roosters	August 2010
(Tonga)	Lopini Paea	Prop	Sydney Roosters	September 2010
(Australia)	Damien Blanch	Wing	Wakefield Trinity Wildcats	September 2010
(Australia)	Ben Farrar	Centre	Manly Warringah Sea Eagles	September 2010
(Australia)	Steve Menzies	Second row	Bradford Bulls	September 2010
(France)	Thibaut Ancely	Second row	Lézignan Sangliers	September 2010
(Australia)	Daryl Millard	Centre	Wakefield Trinity Wildcats	February 2011
(France)	Vincent Duport	Wing	Toulouse Olympique	July 2011

=== Out ===
	Name	Position	Club Signed	Date
(France)	Dimitri Pelo	Wing	Montpellier Hérault Rugby	August 2010
(Australia)	Dallas Johnson	Loose forward	North Queensland Cowboys	August 2010
(France)	Olivier Elima	Second row	Bradford Bulls	September 2010
(Australia)	Steven Bell	Centre	Retirement	September 2010
(Australia)	Casey McGuire	Hooker	Parramatta Eels	September 2010
(France)	Jérôme Guisset	Prop	Retirement	September 2010
(Australia)	Chris Walker	Centre	Parramatta Eels	November 2010
(Australia)	Dane Carlaw	Second row	Brisbane Broncos	November 2010
(New Zealand)	Kane Bentley	Hooker	Pia Donkeys	November 2010
(New Zealand)	Andrew Bentley	Second row	Lézignan Sangliers	November 2010
(Australia)	Brent Sherwin	Scrum half	Released	November 2010
(France)	Tony Gigot	Stand off	Toulouse Olympique (Loan)	April 2011
(France)	William Barthau	Stand off	Dewsbury Rams (Loan)	May 2011
(France)	Thibaut Ancely	Second row	Toulouse Olympique (Loan)	May 2011
(France)	Thibaut Ancely	Second row	Toulouse Olympique (Loan)	August 2011
