= 2012 Super League season =

British rugby league season

Super League XVII
- League: Super League
- Duration: 27 Rounds
- Teams: 14
- Highest attendance: 21,522; Wigan Warriors vs St Helens (7 September)
- Lowest attendance: 1,517; London Broncos vs Salford City Reds (4 August)
- Average attendance: 10,151
- Broadcast partners: Sky Sports; BBC Sport; Eurosport beIN Sports; Fox Soccer Plus; Sport Klub

2012 season
- Champions: Leeds Rhinos; 6th Super League title 9th British title
- League Leaders: Wigan Warriors
- Runners-up: Warrington Wolves
- Man of Steel: (England) Sam Tomkins
- Top point-scorer: (Australia) Scott Dureau (281)
- Top try-scorer: (England) Josh Charnley (31)

The Stobart Super League XVII was the official name of the 2012 Super League season. Fourteen teams competed over 27 rounds, after which the 8 highest finishing teams entered the play-offs to compete for a place in the Grand Final and a chance to win the championship and the Super League Trophy.

The season kicked off on 3 February with two Round 1 fixtures being played: the Widnes Vikings, in their first Super League match since 2005, lost to the Wakefield Trinity Wildcats, while defending champions the Leeds Rhinos defeated the Hull Kingston Rovers and ended on 6 October with Leeds Rhinos beating Warrington Wolves 26-18 in the 2012 Super League Grand Final.

== Teams ==
Super League XVII was the first year of the second round of Super League licences. Under this system, promotion and relegation between Super League and Championship was abolished, and 14 teams were granted licences subject to certain criteria. All existing Super League teams except Crusaders (who pulled out of the application process) earned a place in the 2012 season, Championship team Widnes Vikings were given a licence after their application was deemed better than Halifax and Barrow Raiders.

Geographically, the vast majority of teams in Super League are based in the north of England, five teams – Warrington, St. Helens, Salford, Wigan and Widnes – to the west of the Pennines in Cheshire, Greater Manchester and Merseyside, and seven teams to the east in Yorkshire – Huddersfield, Bradford, Wakefield Trinity, Leeds, Castleford, Hull F.C. and Hull Kingston Rovers. Catalans Dragons are the only team based in France and are outside of the UK and London Broncos are the only team to be based in a capital city (London).

The maps below indicate the locations of teams that competed in Super League XVII.

Team	Stadium	Capacity	City/Area
Bradford Bulls (2012 season)	Odsal Stadium	27,000	Bradford, West Yorkshire
Castleford Tigers (2012 season)	PROBIZ Coliseum	11,750	Castleford, West Yorkshire
Catalans Dragons (2012 season)	Stade Gilbert Brutus	14,000	Perpignan, Pyrénées-Orientales, France
Huddersfield Giants (2012 season)	John Smith's Stadium	24,544	Huddersfield, West Yorkshire
Hull F.C. (2012 season)	Kingston Communications Stadium	25,404	Kingston upon Hull, East Riding of Yorkshire
Hull Kingston Rovers (2012 season)	MS3 Craven Park	9,471	Kingston upon Hull, East Riding of Yorkshire
Leeds Rhinos (2012 season)	Headingley Carnegie Stadium	22,250	Leeds, West Yorkshire
London Broncos (2012 season)	Twickenham Stoop	12,700	Twickenham, London
Salford City Reds (2012 season)	Salford City Stadium	12,000	Salford, Greater Manchester
St Helens R.F.C. (2012 season)	Langtree Park	18,000	St. Helens, Merseyside
Wakefield Trinity Wildcats (2012 season)	Rapid Solicitors Stadium	12,600	Wakefield, West Yorkshire
Warrington Wolves (2012 season)	Halliwell Jones Stadium	15,500	Warrington, Cheshire
Widnes Vikings (2012 season)	Stobart Stadium	11,500	Widnes, Cheshire, England
Wigan Warriors (2012 season)	DW Stadium	25,138	Wigan, Greater Manchester

Legend
Reigning Super League champions
Defending Challenge Cup Champions

== Rules ==
=== Rule changes ===
- Teams will now only be able to make 10 interchanges in a match which has been reduced from 12.
- If a player in possession of the ball hits the corner flag he will no longer be deemed 'In Touch'.
- After a try, teams now have the option of taking the conversion as a drop-kick instead of from a tee.

=== Operational rules ===
- All Super League clubs agreed to operate within the £1.7million salary cap for their top 25 first-tier players.
- Quota spots were reduced to 5, meaning only 5 players could be from abroad. However, players from France, Samoa, Tonga and Papua New Guinea all count as federation-trained and thus do not count against the quota.

== Table ==
Super League XVII
Pos	Team	Pld	W	D	L	PF	PA	PD	Pts	Qualification
1	Wigan Warriors (L)	27	21	0	6	994	449	+545	42	Play-offs
2	Warrington Wolves	27	20	1	6	909	539	+370	41	Play-offs
3	St Helens	27	17	2	8	795	480	+315	36	Play-offs
4	Catalans Dragons	27	18	0	9	812	611	+201	36	Play-offs
5	Leeds Rhinos (C)	27	16	0	11	823	662	+161	32	Play-offs
6	Hull F.C.	27	15	2	10	696	621	+75	32	Play-offs
7	Huddersfield Giants	27	14	0	13	699	664	+35	28	Play-offs
8	Wakefield Trinity Wildcats	27	13	0	14	633	764	−131	26	Play-offs
9	Bradford Bulls	27	14	1	12	633	756	−123	23 (Note: Bradford Bulls deducted 6 points on 25 July 2012 for entering administration)	
10	Hull Kingston Rovers	27	10	1	16	753	729	+24	21	
11	Salford City Reds	27	8	1	18	618	844	−226	17	
12	London Broncos	27	7	0	20	588	890	−302	14	
13	Castleford Tigers	27	6	0	21	554	948	−394	12	
14	Widnes Vikings	27	6	0	21	532	1082	−550	12	

Source: superleague.co.uk and BBC Sport.
Rules for classification: 1st on competition points; 2nd on match points difference.
Competition points: for win = 2; for draw = 1; for loss = 0.
(C) Champions; (L) League Leaders' Shield Winners

== Play-offs ==
The play-offs commenced following the conclusion of the 27-round regular season. To decide the grand finalists from the top eight finishing teams, Super League uses its unique play-off system. The finals concluded with the 2012 Super League Grand Final.

#	Home	Score	Away	Match Information
#	Home	Score	Away	Date and Time (Local)	Venue	Referee	Attendance
QUALIFYING AND ELIMINATION FINALS
Q1	Wigan Warriors	46–6	Catalans Dragons	14 September 2012, 20:00 BST	DW Stadium	Richard Silverwood	7,232
Q2	Warrington Wolves	6–28	St. Helens	15 September 2012, 18:00 BST	Halliwell Jones Stadium	Ben Thaler	10,190
E1	Leeds Rhinos	42–20	Wakefield Trinity Wildcats	15 September 2012, 20:00 BST	Headingley Carnegie Stadium	Steve Ganson	9,044
E2	Hull F.C.	46–10	Huddersfield Giants	16 September 2012, 18:00 BST	KC Stadium	James Child	8,662
PRELIMINARY SEMI-FINALS
P1	Catalans Dragons	20–27	Leeds Rhinos	21 September 2012, 20:45 CEST	Stade Gilbert Brutus	Ben Thaler	11,523
P2	Warrington Wolves	24–12	Hull F.C.	22 September 2012, 18:45 BST	Halliwell Jones Stadium	Richard Silverwood	7,323
SEMI-FINALS
SF1	Wigan Warriors	12–13	Leeds Rhinos	28 September 2012, 20:00 BST	DW Stadium	Richard Silverwood	8,235
SF2	St. Helens	18–36	Warrington Wolves	29 September 2012, 18:15 BST	Langtree Park	Ben Thaler	12,715
GRAND FINAL
F	Leeds Rhinos	26–18	Warrington Wolves	6 October 2012, 18:00 BST	Old Trafford, Manchester	Richard Silverwood	70,676

2012 Super League play-offs bracket

Qualifying/Elimination playoffs
1	Wigan Warriors	46
4	Catalans Dragons	6
5	Leeds Rhinos	42
8	Wakefield Trinity Wildcats	20
6	Hull F.C.	46
7	Huddersfield Giants	10
2	Warrington Wolves	6
3	St Helens	28

Preliminary semifinals
Catalans Dragons	20
Leeds Rhinos	27
Hull F.C.	12
Warrington Wolves	24

Qualifying semifinals
Wigan selected Leeds
Wigan Warriors	12
Leeds Rhinos	13
St Helens	18
Warrington Wolves	36

Grand Final
6 October, Old Trafford
Leeds Rhinos	26
Warrington Wolves	18

Week 1. Qualifying/Elimination play-offs: Fixtures decided by regular reason finishing positions. Higher ranked teams play lower ranked teams. Higher ranked teams receive home ground advantage.
Week 2. Preliminary semi-finals: Fixtures decided by regular season finishing positions. Higher ranked teams play lower ranked teams. Higher ranked teams receive home ground advantage.
Week 3. Qualifying semi-finals: Winners of Qualifying play-offs play winners of Qualifying semi-finals. Fixtures decided by club call. Winners of Qualifying play-offs receive home ground advantage.

== Season statistics ==
=== Top try-scorers ===
Rank	Player	Club	Tries
1	(England) Josh Charnley	Wigan Warriors	31
2	(England) Sam Tomkins	Wigan Warriors	29
3	(England) Ryan Hall	Leeds Rhinos	26
4=	(England) Ryan Atkins	Warrington Wolves	23
4=	(England) Chris Riley	Warrington Wolves	23
6=	(New Zealand) George Carmont	Wigan Warriors	20
6=	(Australia) Joel Monaghan	Warrington Wolves	20
8	(England) Paul Wellens	St Helens RLFC	19
9=	(France) Vincent Duport	Catalans Dragons	18
9=	(England) Danny McGuire	Leeds Rhinos	18

=== Top try assists ===
Rank	Player	Club	Assists
1	(Australia) Michael Dobson	Hull Kingston Rovers	35
2	(Australia) Tim Smith	Wakefield Trinity Wildcats	34
3	(England) Sam Tomkins	Wigan Warriors	33
4	(England) Rangi Chase	Castleford Tigers	29
5	(Australia) Brett Finch	Wigan Warriors	28
6	(Australia) Scott Dureau	Catalans Dragons	28
7	(Australia) Daniel Holdsworth	Salford City Reds	23
8	(Australia) Craig Gower	London Broncos	21
9	(England) Jonny Lomax	St Helens RLFC	21
10	(England) James Roby	St Helens RLFC	20

=== Top goalscorers ===
Rank	Player	Club	Goals
1	(England) Kevin Sinfield	Leeds Rhinos	118
2	(Australia) Scott Dureau	Catalans Dragons	113
3	(Australia) Michael Dobson	Hull Kingston Rovers	103
4	(England) Danny Brough	Huddersfield Giants	101
5	(England) Danny Tickle	Hull FC	76
6	(Australia) Daniel Holdsworth	Salford City Reds	69
7	(Australia) Brett Hodgson	Warrington Wolves	68
8	(England) Paul Sykes	Wakefield Trinity Wildcats	68
9	(England) Luke Gale	Bradford Bulls	65
10	(England) Josh Charnley	Wigan Warriors	56

=== Top points scorers ===
Rank	Player	Club	Points
1	(Australia) Scott Dureau	Catalans Dragons	281
2	(England) Kevin Sinfield	Leeds Rhinos	257
3	(Australia) Michael Dobson	Hull Kingston Rovers	245
4	(England) Josh Charnley	Wigan Warriors	240
5	(England) Danny Brough	Huddersfield Giants	225
6	(England) Danny Tickle	Hull FC	186
7	(Australia) Pat Richards	Wigan Warriors	178
8	(Australia) Brett Hodgson	Warrington Wolves	160
9	(Australia) Daniel Holdsworth	Salford City Reds	164
10	(England) Sam Tomkins	Wigan Warriors	158

=== Discipline ===
Rank	Player	Club	Yellow card	Red card
1	(England) Michael McIlorum	Wigan Warriors	0	2
2	(Australia) Luke O'Donnell	Huddersfield Giants	1	1
3=	(England) Bryn Hargreaves	Bradford Bulls	0	1
3=	(England) Gareth Hock	Wigan Warriors	0	1
3=	(England) Shaun Magennis	St Helens RLFC	0	1
3=	(Tonga) Sam Moa	Hull FC	0	1
3=	(New Zealand) Tony Puletua	St Helens RLFC	0	1
3=	(England) Chris Tuson	Wigan Warriors	0	1
9=	(France) Jason Baitieri	Catalans Dragons	2	0
9=	(Australia) Ben Cross	Widnes Vikings	2	0
9=	(Australia) Michael Dobson	Hull Kingston Rovers	2	0
9=	(France) Olivier Elima	Bradford Bulls	2	0
12=	(New Zealand) Vinnie Anderson	Salford City Reds	1	0
12=	(Australia) Jason Chan	Huddersfield Giants	1	0
12=	(England) Jon Clarke	Widnes Vikings	1	0
12=	(England) Tony Clubb	London Broncos	1	0
12=	(England) Leroy Cudjoe	Huddersfield Giants	1	0
12=	(Wales) Gil Dudson	Wigan Warriors	1	0
12=	(Wales) Jacob Emmitt	Castleford Tigers	1	0
12=	(England) Brett Ferres	Castleford Tigers	1	0
12=	(England) Paddy Flynn	Widnes Vikings	1	0
12=	(England) Jamie Foster	St Helens RLFC	1	0
12=	(England) Luke Gale	Bradford Bulls	1	0
12=	(Republic of Ireland) Gareth Haggerty	Widnes Vikings	1	0
12=	(England) Ian Henderson	Catalans Dragons	1	0
12=	(England) Chris Hill	Warrington Wolves	1	0
12=	(Australia) Daniel Holdsworth	Salford City Reds	1	0
12=	(Australia) Ben Jeffries	Bradford Bulls	1	0
12=	(Australia) Heath L'Estrange	Bradford Bulls	1	0
12=	(Tonga) Willie Manu	Hull FC	1	0
12=	(England) Stephen Nash	Castleford Tigers	1	0
12=	(Australia) Mark O'Meley	Hull FC	1	0
12=	(England) Richard Owen	Castleford Tigers	1	0
12=	(Australia) Luke Patten	Salford City Reds	1	0
12=	(England) Steve Pickersgill	Widnes Vikings	1	0
12=	(England) Karl Pryce	Bradford Bulls	1	0
12=	(Australia) Michael Robertson	London Broncos	1	0
12=	(England) Michael Shenton	St Helens RLFC	1	0
12=	(England) Kevin Sinfield	Leeds Rhinos	1	0
12=	(England) Scott Taylor	Hull Kingston Rovers	1	0
12=	(Australia) Anthony Watts	Widnes Vikings	1	0
12=	(England) Paul Wood	Warrington Wolves	1	0

=== Awards ===
Awards are presented for outstanding contributions and efforts to players and clubs in the week leading up to the Super League Grand Final:

- Man of Steel: Sam Tomkins (Wigan Warriors)
- Coach of the year: Mick Potter (Bradford Bulls)
- Engage Super League club of the year: Wigan Warriors
- Young player of the year: Zak Hardaker (Leeds) Rhinos
- Carnegie community player of the year: Danny McGuire (Leeds Rhinos)
- Frontline Fairplay Index winners:
- Metre-maker: James Roby (St Helens) - 3,971 metres
- Hit Man: Danny Washbrook (Wakefield Trinity Wildcats) - 991 Tackles
- Mike Gregory Spirit of Rugby League Award: Jamie Peacock (Leeds Rhinos)
- Lifetime Achievement: Ryan Hudson, Ben Jeffries and Danny Orr

== Media ==
=== Television ===
2012 is the first year of a five-year contract with Sky Sports to televise 70 matches per season. The deal which runs until 2016 is worth £90million.

Sky Sports coverage in the UK see two live matches broadcast each week – one on Friday night, which kicks-off at 8:00 pm and another usually on Saturday evenings at 5:45 pm, although for 2012, some matches between May and August will be scheduled for Monday nights at 8:00 pm, filling the gap vacated by the summer break of Premier League football. Regular commentators were Eddie Hemmings and Mike Stephenson with summarisers including Phil Clarke, Shaun McRae, Brian Carney, Barrie McDermott and Terry O'Connor. Sky will broadcast highlights this season in a new show on Sunday Nights called Super League - Full Time, usually airing at 10pm.

BBC Sport broadcast a highlights programme called the Super League Show, presented by Tanya Arnold. The BBC show two weekly broadcasts of the programme. The first is only to the BBC North West, Yorkshire & North Midlands, North East & Cumbria, and East Yorkshire & Lincolnshire regions on Monday evenings at 11:35pm on BBC One, while a repeat showing is shown on BBC Two in the early hours of Tuesday morning. The Super League Show is also available for one week after broadcast for streaming or download via the BBC iPlayer in the UK only. End of season play-offs are shown on BBC Two across the whole country in a weekly highlights package.

Internationally, Super League is shown live or delayed on Showtime Sports (Middle East), Māori Television (New Zealand), TV 2 Sport (Norway), NTV+ (Russia), Fox Soccer Plus (United States), Eurosport (Australia) or SportsNet World (Canada).

=== Radio ===
BBC Coverage:

- BBC Radio 5 Live Sports Extra (National DAB Digital Radio) normally carry one Super League commentary a week on Friday Nights.
- BBC Manchester will carry commentary of Wigan and Salford whilst sharing commentary of Warrington with BBC Merseyside.
- BBC Humberside will have full match commentary of all Hull KR and Hull matches.
- BBC Leeds carry commentaries featuring Bradford, Leeds, Castleford, Wakefield and Huddersfield.
- BBC Merseyside (AM/DAB only) will have commentary on St Helens and Widnes matches whilst sharing commentary of Warrington with BBC Manchester.
- BBC London 94.9 airs all London Broncos games home & away, mainly via online streaming only.

Commercial Radio Coverage:

- 102.4 Wish FM will carry commentaries of Wigan & St Helens matches.
- 107.2 Wire FM will carry commentaries on Warrington & Widnes Matches.
- BCB 106.6 (Bradford Community Broadcasting) have full match commentary of Bradford Bulls home and away.
- Yorkshire Radio increases its coverage to air 50 games in the 2012 season.
- Radio Warrington (Online Station) all Warrington home games and some away games.
- Grand Sud FM covers every Catalans Dragons Home Match (in French).
- Radio France Bleu Roussillon covers every Catalans Dragons Away Match (in French).

All Super League commentaries on any station are available via the particular stations on-line streaming.

=== Internet ===
ESPN3 has worldwide broadband rights.

Starting from Thursday 9 April 2009, all of the matches shown on Sky Sports will also be available live online via Livestation everywhere in the world excluding the US, Puerto Rico, UK, Ireland, France, Monaco, Australia and New Zealand. List of Super League games available on Livestation.com
