= Kevin Larroyer =

France international rugby league footballer

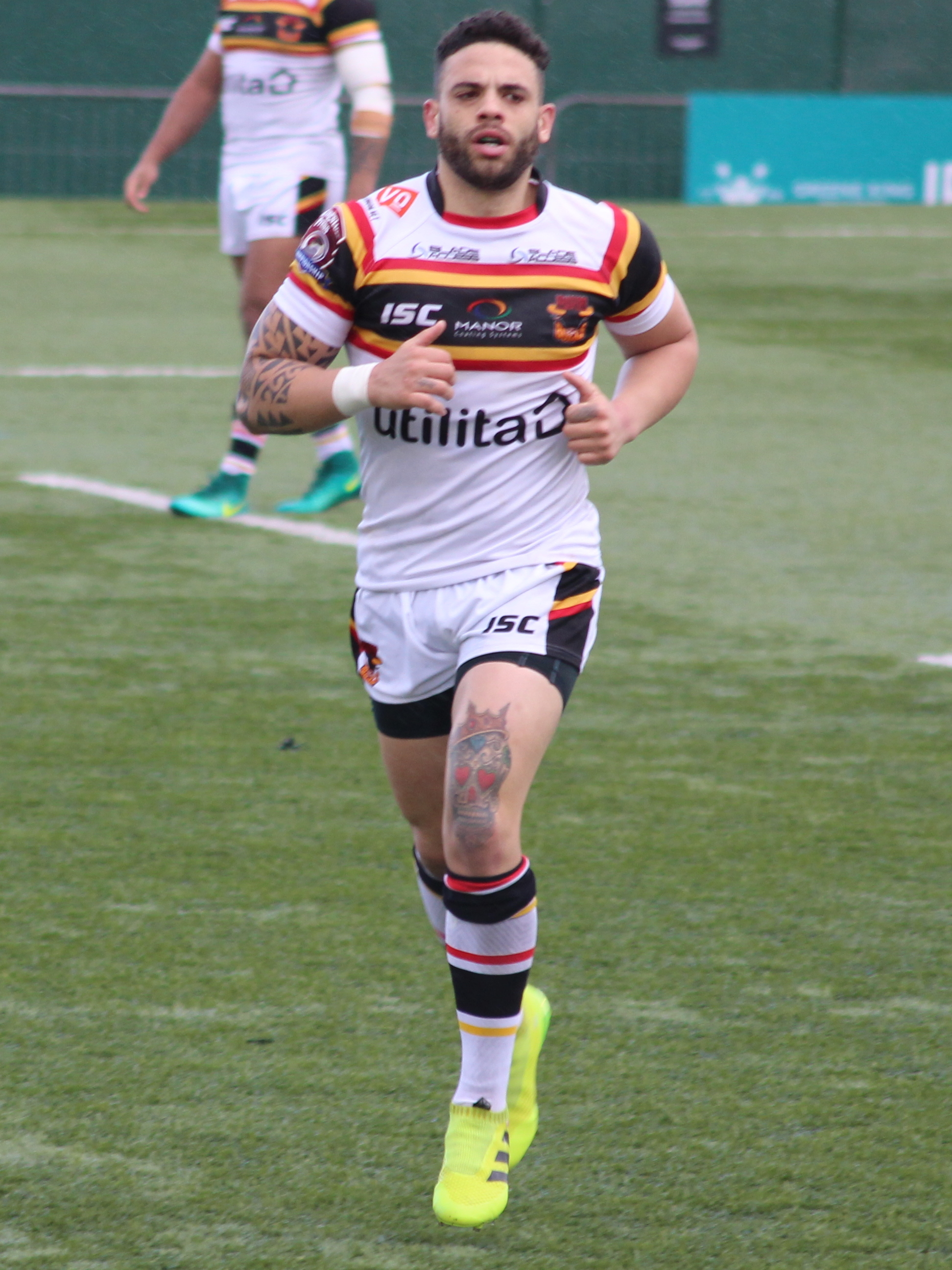

Personal information
- Born: 19 June 1989 (age 37) Toulouse, France
- Height: 6 ft 0 in (183 cm)
- Weight: 15 st 2 lb (96 kg)

Playing information
- Position: Second-row
Club
Years	Team	Pld	T	G	FG	P
2010–12	Toulouse Olympique	41	4	0	0	16
2012–13	Catalans Dragons	22	10	0	0	40
2014–16	Hull Kingston Rovers	62	11	0	0	44
2016(loan)	→ Newcastle Thunder	3	0	0	0	0
2017	Castleford Tigers	7	0	0	0	0
2017(loan)	→ Bradford Bulls	9	2	0	0	8
2018	Leigh Centurions	26	9	0	0	36
2019–24	Halifax Panthers	126	8	0	0	32
2025–26	Hunslet	29	1	0	0	4
	Total	325	45	0	0	180
Representative
Years	Team	Pld	T	G	FG	P
2012–16	France	15	3	0	0	12
- Source: As of 4 September 2026

Kevin Larroyer (born 19 June 1989) is a French professional rugby league footballer who last played as a second-row for Hunslet in the Championship.

He previously played for Toulouse Olympique, Catalans Dragons, Hull Kingston Rovers, Castleford Tigers, Halifax Panthers and the Bradford Bulls.

== Background ==
Larroyer was born in Toulouse, France.

== Club career ==
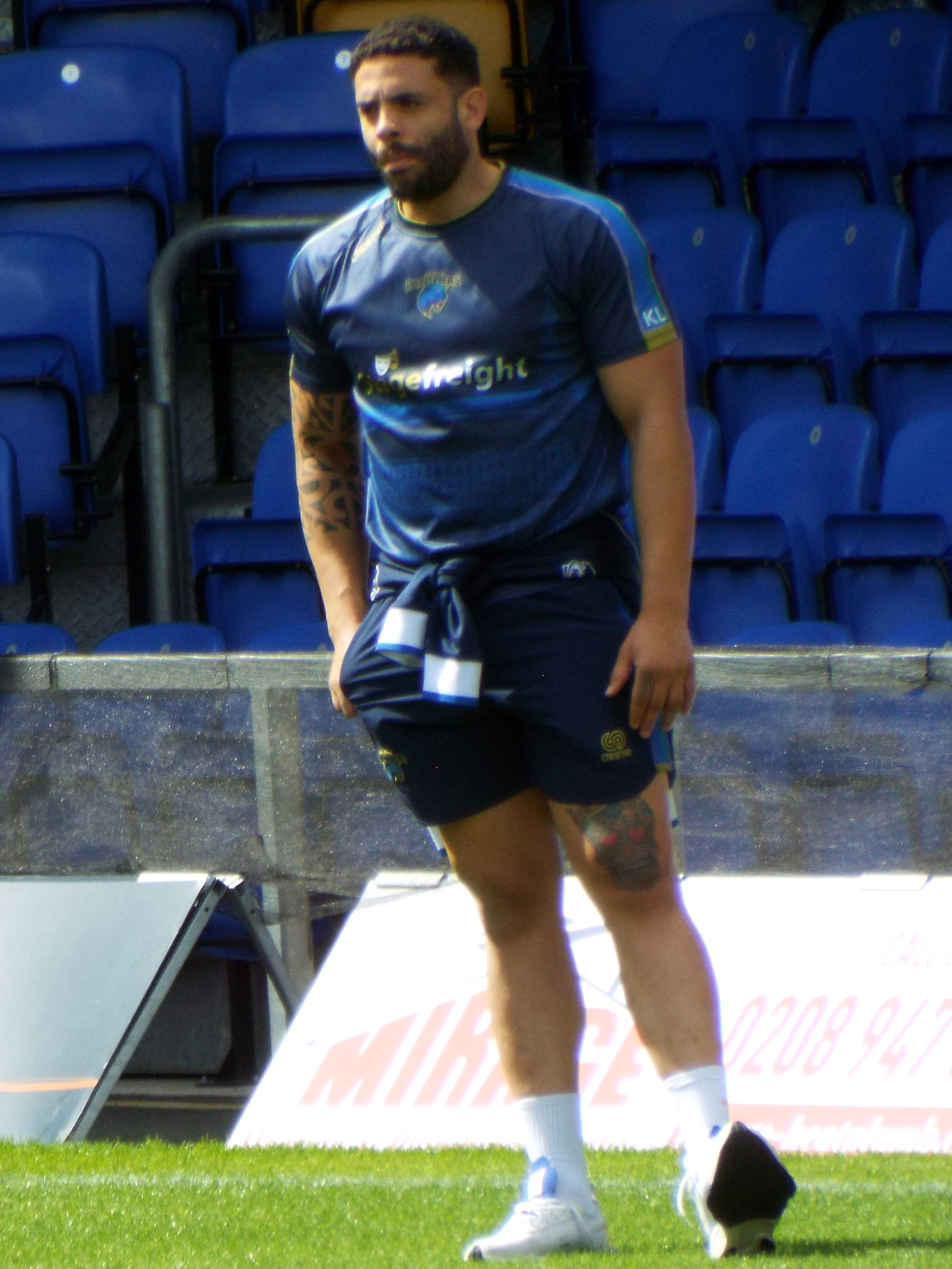
Larroyer with the Halifax Panthers in 2023

=== Toulouse Olympique ===
Larroyer began his professional career with Toulouse Olympique.

=== Catalans Dragons ===
He moved to the Catalans Dragons for the 2012 season.

=== Hull Kingston Rovers ===
In 2013, Larroyer was signed by Hull Kingston Rovers from Catalans Dragons on a season long loan deal. After an impressive season at Hull Kingston Rovers, making 22 appearances for the Robins and scoring seven tries the club extended Larroyer's loan deal for another year for the 2015 season.

In September 2015, the French international committed his future to Hull Kingston Rovers by signing a three-year deal taking his service with the Robins into 2018.

=== Castleford Tigers ===
He was released from his contract following Hull Kingston Rovers' relegation from Super League at the end of the 2016 season and subsequently joined Castleford Tigers in 2017.

=== Bradford Bulls ===
He spent time on loan at the Bradford Bulls to regain match fitness early in the 2017 season.

=== Leigh Centurions ===
Larroyer joined Leigh on 17 October 2017 on a two-year deal.

=== Halifax ===
In 2019, he signed a contract to join Halifax, and a one-year contract extension in October 2020. In 2023, Larroyer played in Halifax's 1895 Cup final victory at Wembley.

=== Hunslet ===
In November 2024, Larroyer signed with newly-promoted Hunslet of the RFL Championship for the 2025 season.

On 24 August 2026 it was reported that he had left Hunslet RLFC

== International career ==
Larroyer made his senior debut for France in June 2012, appearing from the bench against Wales in a mid-season international at the Racecourse Ground, Wrexham. Later that year, he appeared in all France's matches in the 2012 Autumn International Series, including another win over Wales and two losses to England.

In 2013 Larroyer was selected to represent his home country in the Rugby League World Cup. He started in all three group stage matches, a win over Papua New Guinea, and losses to New Zealand and Samoa.

Larroyer earned three more caps at the 2014 European Championship. During a 22-12 defeat by Ireland in Tallaght Stadium, Dublin, Larroyer scored his first international try.

During 2015, Larroyer again earned three caps for France in the European Championship, scoring the final try in a 31-14 victory over Ireland in Albi and scoring again in the 32-18 victory over Scotland in Avignon. A fourth international appearance came in a 84-4 defeat to England at Leigh.

In 2016 Larroyer was selected to play for his country in France's lone international against England in Avignon.
