= Damien Blanch =

Ireland international rugby league footballer

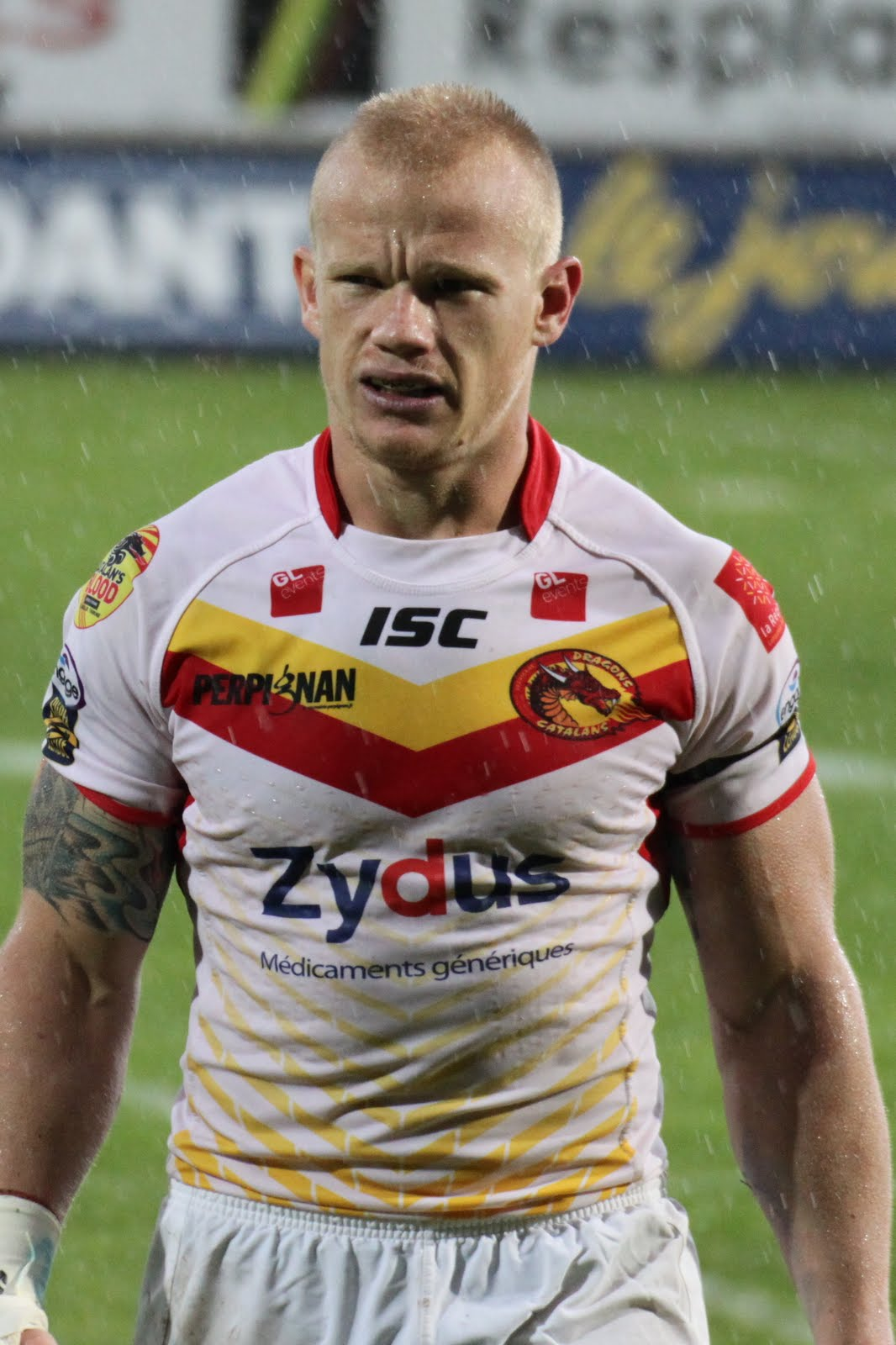

Personal information
- Born: 24 May 1983 (age 43) Sydney, New South Wales, Australia

Playing information
- Height: 1.83 m (6 ft 0 in)
- Weight: 95 kg (14 st 13 lb)
- Position: Wing
Club
Years	Team	Pld	T	G	FG	P
2005–06	Castleford Tigers	12	4	0	0	16
2007	Widnes Vikings	39	28	0	0	112
2008–10	Wakefield Trinity Wildcats	52	36	0	0	144
2011–13	Catalans Dragons	75	46	0	0	184
	Total	178	114	0	0	456
Representative
Years	Team	Pld	T	G	FG	P
2006–13	Ireland	9	9	0	0	36

Damien Blanch (born 24 May 1983) is a former Ireland international rugby league footballer. He last played in the Super League as a winger for the Catalans Dragons, and has previously played for the Widnes Vikings, Castleford Tigers (Heritage No. 843) and the Wakefield Trinity Wildcats (Heritage No. 1263).

== Background ==
Blanch was born in Sydney, New South Wales, Australia.

== Career ==
He received an international call-up from Ireland in November 2006, and was named in the Ireland squad for the 2008 Rugby League World Cup. He finished the tournament among the top try scorers, attracting praise from many pundits for his good performances as Ireland exceeded expectations.

He was named Ireland player of the year for 2009.

Blanch joined Catalans Dragons ahead of the 2011 Super League season, and remained there for three years before departing at the end of 2013. In 2011 he was the club's top try-scorer.

He was named in the Ireland squad for the 2013 Rugby League World Cup.

He is currently playing for the Thirroul Butchers in the Illawarra Coal League.
