= Daryl Millard =

Fiji international rugby league footballer

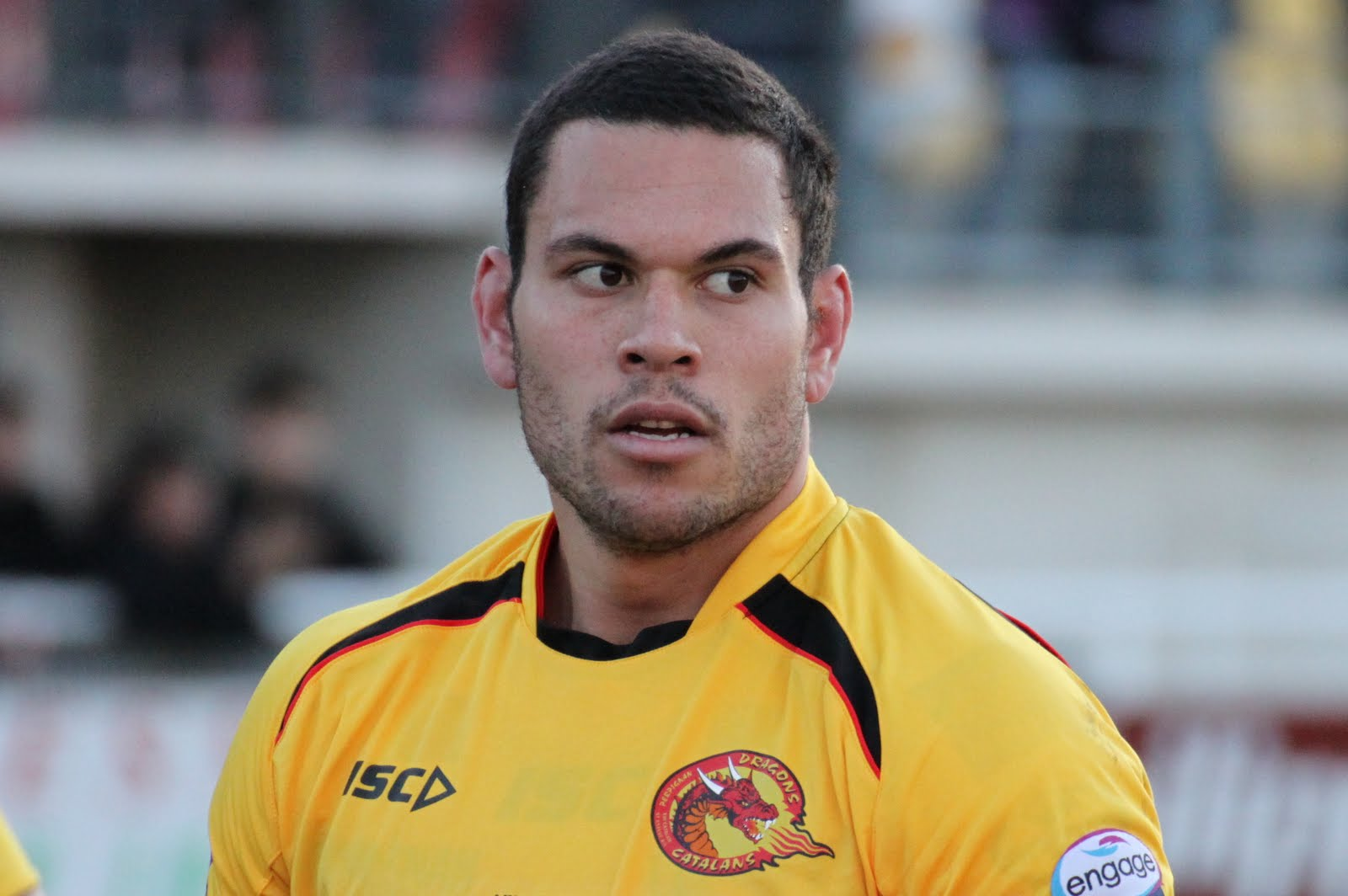

Personal information
- Born: 20 February 1985 (age 41) Kogarah, New South Wales, Australia

Playing information
- Height: 1.84 m (6 ft 0 in)
- Weight: 95 kg (14 st 13 lb)
- Position: Centre, Wing, Five-eighth
Club
Years	Team	Pld	T	G	FG	P
2006	St. George Illawarra	12	4	0	0	16
2007–09	Canterbury Bulldogs	48	16	0	0	64
2010–11	Wakefield Trinity Wildcats	23	11	0	0	44
2012–14	Catalans Dragons	99	41	1	0	166
2015	South Sydney	4	0	0	0	0
	Total	186	72	1	0	290
Representative
Years	Team	Pld	T	G	FG	P
2008–15	Fiji	9	4	0	0	4
2012–13	Exiles	2	1	0	0	4
- Father: Shane Millard
- Relatives: Ryan Millard (brother)

Daryl Millard (born 20 February 1985) is a Fiji international rugby league footballer who last played for the South Sydney Rabbitohs in the NRL. He previously played for the Catalans Dragons, Canterbury-Bankstown and St George Illawarra.

== Background ==
Millard was born in Kogarah, New South Wales, Australia and is Australian-Fijian descent.

His father Shane Millard is a former reserve-grade coach for the St George Dragons, and his younger brother Ryan Millard plays for the Shellharbour City Dragons in the New South Wales Cup and is also a Fiji international.

== Playing career ==
Millard was a Renown United junior. Millard made his first grade début for the St George Illawarra Dragons in 2006, scoring four tries in the season. He has played centre, wing and fullback in Jersey Flegg and Premier League and has established himself as a centre in first grade. He joined Canterbury-Bankstown in 2007.

Millard played 25 games for 2007 NRL season and scored 13 tries as Canterbury finished sixth on the table. Millard played in both finals games for the club which both ended in defeat. In the 2008 NRL season, Millard played 12 games as Canterbury finished last on the table and claimed the wooden spoon.

In 2009, Millard played 11 games for Canterbury-Bankstown as the club finished second on the table and qualified for the finals. Millard missed out on playing in the club's finals campaign as they reached the preliminary final but were defeated by arch rivals Parramatta at Telstra Stadium.

In 2010, Millard joined the Wakefield Trinity Wildcats team in the Super League competition on a 2-year contract. He effectively replaced Ryan Atkins who joined the Warrington Wolves.

In June 2012, he signed a new deal with Catalans Dragons, further extending his stay at the club till end of 2014 season.

In Winter 2014, Millard signed for the South Sydney Rabbitohs on a 'Train & Play' basis after completing his contract with the Catalans Dragons.

His younger brother Ryan Millard signed for the Rochdale Hornets after impressing in the 2013 Rugby League World Cup.

In Round 4 of the 2015 NRL season, Millard made his South Sydney début against the Parramatta Eels as a centre and played there until round 7 whilst Dylan Walker was out with an injury.

== International career ==
Millard was named in the Fiji training squad for the 2008 Rugby League World Cup. He was named in the Fiji squad for the 2008 Rugby League World Cup.

He was named in the Fiji squad for the 2013 Rugby League World Cup. Millard and his brother were selected for the Fiji Bati squad for the 2015 Melanesian Cup test-match. Both played for the Fiji in the first test match against the PNG Kumuls on 2 May 2015 at Cbus Super Stadium, Robina, Gold Coast, Australia.
