= Mickaël Simon =

Former France international rugby league footballer

Mickael Simon
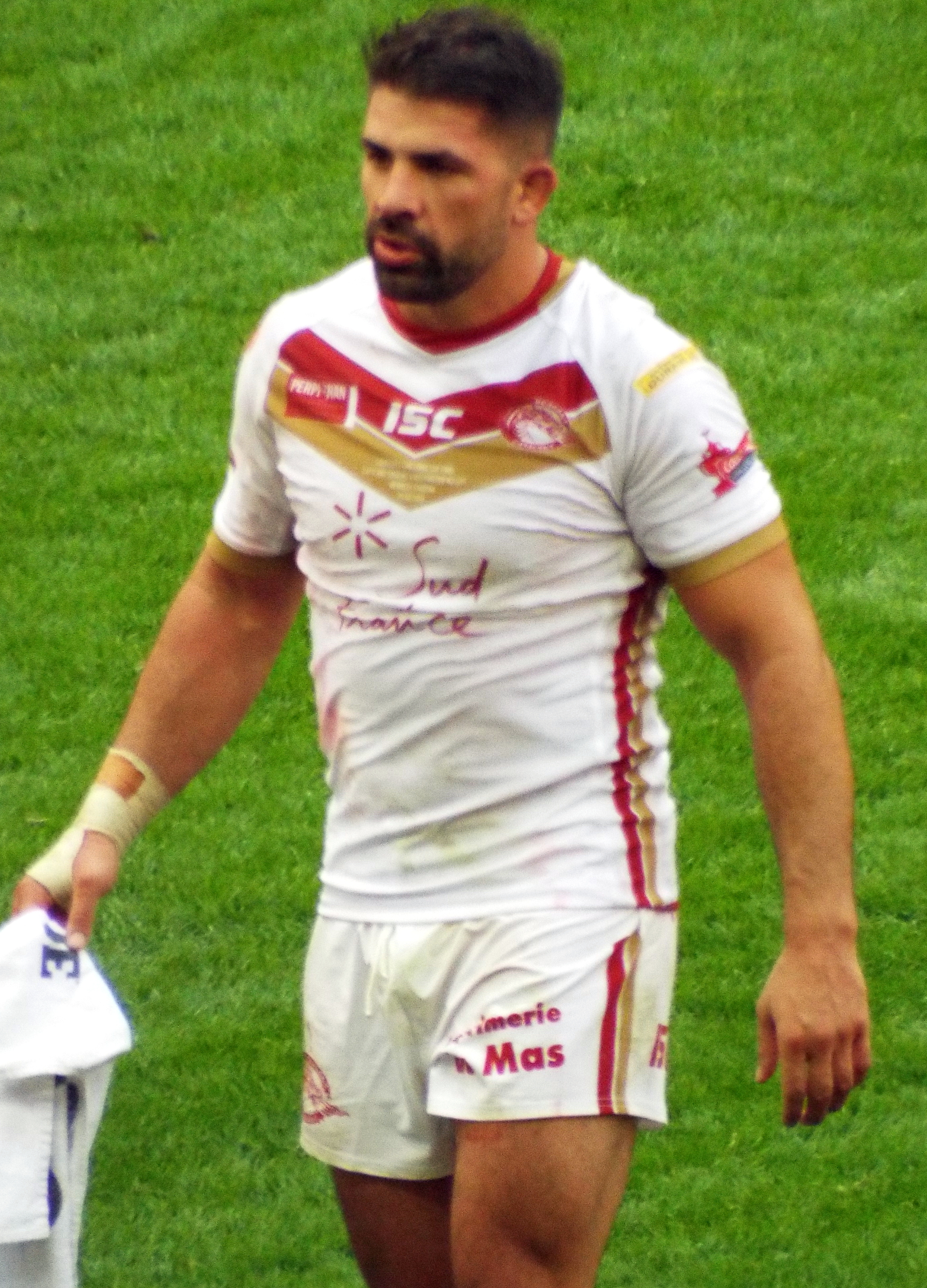

Personal information
- Full name: Mickaël Simon
- Born: 2 April 1987 (age 38); Carcassonne, Languedoc-Roussillon, France
- Height: 6 ft 2 in (1.88 m)
- Weight: 15 st 6 lb (98 kg)

Playing information
- Position: Prop
Club
Years	Team	Pld	T	G	FG	P
–10	Limoux Grizzlies
2010–14	Catalans Dragons	74	3	0	0	12
2015–16	Wakefield Trinity Wildcats	49	14	0	0	56
2017–20	Catalans Dragons	71	2	0	0	8
2020–	AS Carcassonne	49	11	0	0	0
	Total	243	30	0	0	76
Representative
Years	Team	Pld	T	G	FG	P
2010–16	France	17	2	0	0	8
- Source: As of 19 January 2021

Mickaël Simon (born 2 April 1987) is a French rugby league footballer who plays as a prop for AS Carcassonne in the Elite One Championship and for France at international level.

He previously played for the Wakefield Trinity Wildcats and Catalans in the Super League.

== Background ==
Simon was born in Carcassonne, France.

He played for the Limoux Grizzlies as a youth.

== Playing career ==
Simon starter his career in the Elite One Championship with Limoux, before joining Catalans Dragons. He made his Super League début in 2010 and established himself as a regular member of the Dragons forward pack in 2011.

In November 2016 the Frenchman went back to his home country to play for Catalans Dragons again. The Wakefield Trinity Wildcats and the Dragons agreed on a two-year deal for Simon, this will last until the end of the 2018 Super League season.

He played in the 2018 Challenge Cup Final victory over the Warrington Wolves at Wembley Stadium.

=== AS Carcassonne ===
On 11 December 2020, it was announced that he had left Catalans Dragons to join AS Carcassonne in the Elite One Championship

== International career ==
Simon played all four of France's matches at the 2013 Rugby League World Cup. He left the Dragons to join English club Wakefield Trinity Wildcats in 2015.

He played in the 2014 and 2015 European Cup competitions. During the 2015 tournament, there was a mid-tournament test-match against England. Simon played in the team which was considered a 'weakened' French side due to injury and it showed with an appalling showing against their opponents. Simon played in the 2016 end of year test match against England in Avignon.
