= Cyril Stacul =

France international rugby league footballer

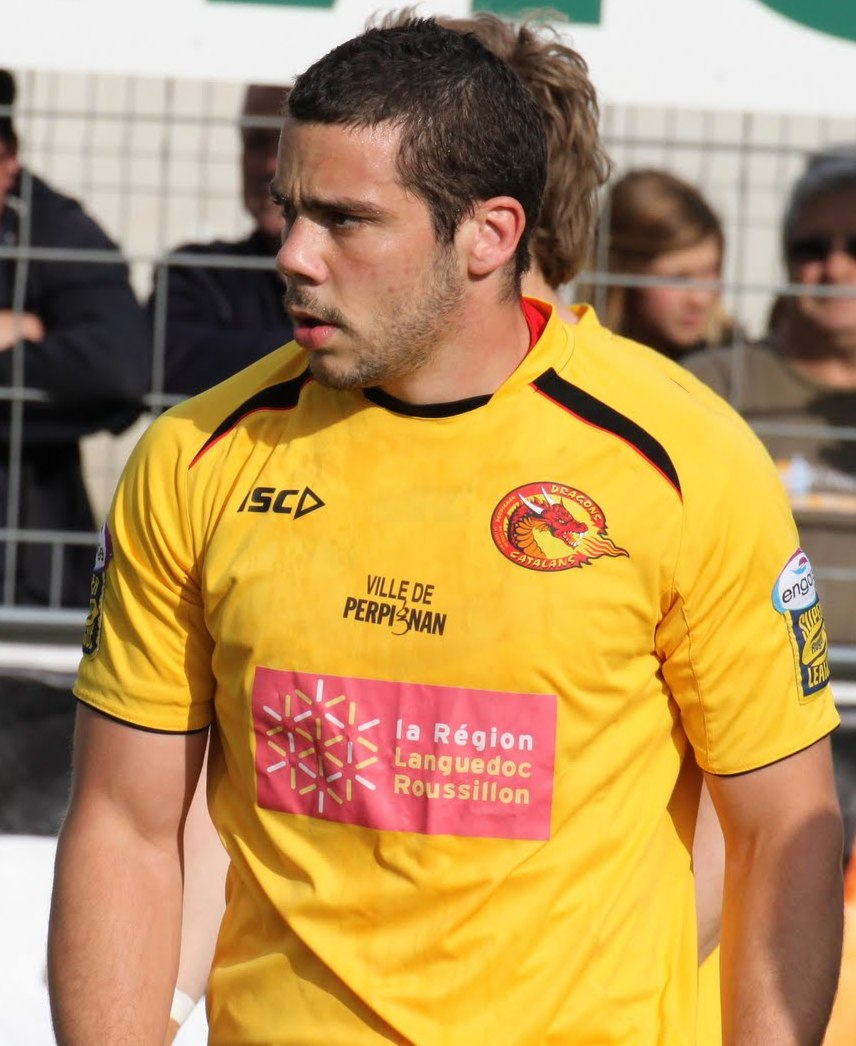

Personal information
- Born: 12 October 1984 (age 42) Villeneuve-sur-Lot, Aquitaine, France
- Height: 1.79 m (5 ft 10 in)
- Weight: 88 kg (13 st 12 lb)

Playing information
- Position: Wing, Centre
Club
Years	Team	Pld	T	G	FG	P
2007–12	Catalans Dragons	67	21	0	0	84
2012–13	SM Pia XIII	9	2	0	0	8
2013–20	Lézignan Sangliers	136	51	0	0	204
	Total	212	74	0	0	296
Representative
Years	Team	Pld	T	G	FG	P
2007–13	France	16	10	0	0	40

Coaching information
Club
Years	Team	Gms	W	D	L	W%
202?–26	FC Lézignan XIII	0	0	0	0
- Source: As of 21 November 2026

Cyril Stacul (born 12 October 1984) is a French rugby league coach and former player who played as a winger or centre for the FC Lezignan in the Elite One Championship and has played for France at international level and last coached FC Lezignan in the Super XIII.

He previously played for the Catalans Dragons in the Super League and SM Pia XIII in the French top flight.

Stacul was named in the France training squad for the 2008 Rugby League World Cup.

He represented France again in the 2010 European Cup.
