= Frédéric Vaccari =

Former France international rugby league footballer

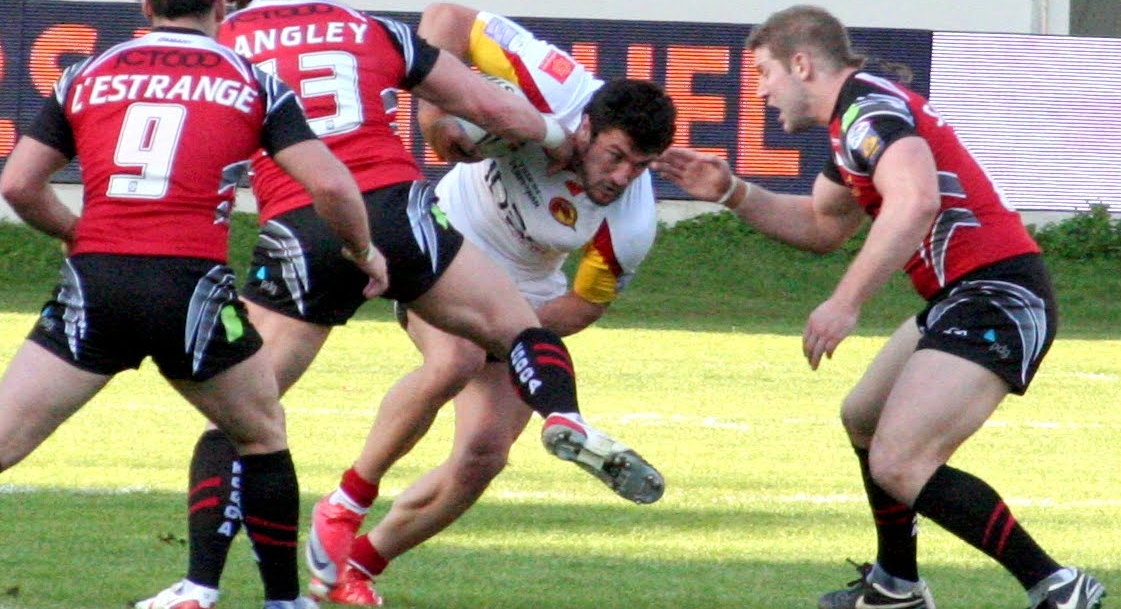

Personal information
- Born: 7 November 1987 (age 39) Villeneuve-sur-Lot, Aquitaine, France
- Height: 1.82 m (6 ft 0 in)
- Weight: 90 kg (14 st 2 lb)

Playing information
- Position: Wing
Club
Years	Team	Pld	T	G	FG	P
2009–14	Catalans Dragons	58	29	0	0	116
2015–	Palau Broncos	55	24	0	0	96
Representative
Years	Team	Pld	T	G	FG	P
2009–14	France	13	2	0	0	8
- Source: As of 10 December 2017

Frédéric Vaccari (born 7 November 1987) is a French professional rugby league footballer who plays for the Palau Broncos in the French Elite One Championship. A France international representative wing, he previously played for Catalans Dragons in the Super League and for Toulouse Olympique and Villeneuve Leopards in the French Elite One Championship.

He was named in the France training squad for the 2008 Rugby League World Cup.

He represented France in the 2010 European Cup, a pre match before the 2011 Four Nations. 2012 Autumn International Series, 2013 Rugby League World Cup and 2014 European Cup.
