= Éloi Pélissier =

France international rugby league footballer

Eloi Pelissier
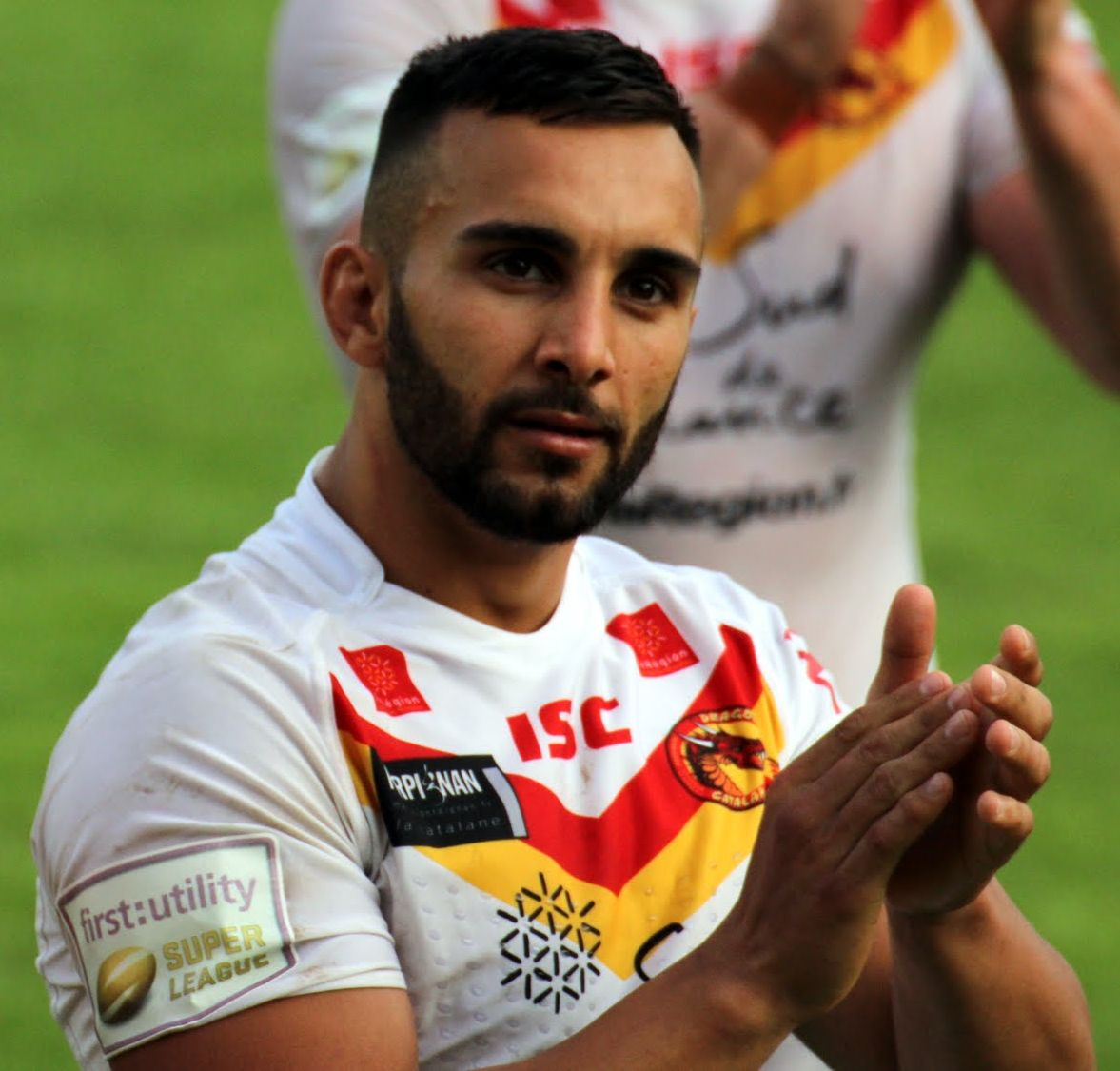

Personal information
- Full name: Éloi Pélissier
- Born: 18 June 1991 (age 35) Perpignan, Pyrénées-Orientales, Occitania, France
- Height: 5 ft 8 in (1.73 m)
- Weight: 13 st 1 lb (83 kg)

Playing information
- Position: Hooker
Club
Years	Team	Pld	T	G	FG	P
2011–16	Catalans Dragons	155	27	0	1	109
2017	Leigh Centurions	21	0	0	0	0
2017–18	FC Lézignan XIII	12	3	0	1	13
2018–20	London Broncos	27	5	0	0	20
2021–24	Toulouse Olympique	71	20	1	2	84
2024–25	Pia XIII Baroudeur	16	4	0	0	16
2025	Oldham RLFC	13	1	0	0	4
2025–	Pia XIII Baroudeur	0	0	0	0	0
	Total	315	60	1	4	246
Representative
Years	Team	Pld	T	G	FG	P
2011–	France	23	9	0	0	36
- Source: As of 8 May 2025

Éloi Pélissier (born 18 June 1991) is a French professional rugby league footballer who plays as a hooker for Pia in the Super XIII and France at international level.

He has previously played for the Catalans Dragons and the Leigh Centurions in the Super League, the London Broncos in the Championship and the Super League, Oldham in the Championship and Lézignan in the Elite One Championship.

== Background ==
Pelissier was born in Perpignan, Languedoc-Roussillon, France. He is of Spanish descent.

== Playing career ==
Pélissier had a trial with Wigan Warriors in 2008 in their Under 18s squad. He made 2 appearances against Huddersfield Giants and Hull Kingston Rovers playing centre but failed to earn a contract.

In 2009 and 2010 Pélissier played for St Estève in the Elite One Championship. He has repressed France at Under 20s level and was included in the French train-on squad for 2010 Alitalia European Cup.

He joined the Catalans Dragons in 2011. Pelissier made his Super League début for the Dragons in a 22-16 defeat by St Helens in 2011, coming off the bench to play at hooker. He then played the week after, in a 31-18 victory over Hull Kingston Rovers, and went on to establish himself as a regular in the Dragons side.

He signed with Lézignan Sangliers for the 2017-18 season.

=== Toulouse Olympique ===
On 2 November 2020, it was reported that he had signed for Toulouse Olympique in the RFL Championship. In round 23 of the 2022 Super League season, Pélissier scored two tries for Toulouse Olympique in a 32-18 loss against Warrington. He played a total of 19 games for Toulouse in the 2022 Super League season as the club finished bottom of the table and were relegated back to the RFL Championship. On 15 October 2023, he played in Toulouse Olympique's upset loss in the Million Pound Game against the London Broncos.

=== Oldham RLFC ===
On 8 May 2025 it was reported that he had signed for Oldham RLFC in the RFL Championship, joining from Super XIII club Baroudeurs de Pia XIII

== International career ==
Pélissier made his full international debut for France in 2011. He played for France in the 2013 Rugby League World Cup and 2014 European Cup. Pélissier returned to the international stage in the end of year test match against England in Avignon. He scored France's lone try in the match as the French went on to be lose 6-40. During the 2017 World Cup in Perth, Australia, Pélissier was expelled from the French delegation after breaking curfew.
