= David Guasch =

French rugby league footballer

Personal information
- Full name: David Guasch
- Born: 3 January 1990 (age 36) Perpignan, Languedoc-Roussillon, France
- Height: 6 ft 0 in (1.83 m)
- Weight: 80 kg (12 st 8 lb)

Playing information
- Position: Stand-off, Fullback
Club
Years	Team	Pld	T	G	FG	P
2010–14	Catalans Dragons	2	0	0	0	0
2014–	Palau Broncos	0	0	0	0	0
	Total	2	0	0	0	0

David Guasch (born 3 January 1990), also known by the nicknames of "Gash" or "Gush", is a French professional rugby league footballer formerly of the Catalans Dragons in the Super League, the elite competition of northern hemisphere rugby league. Guasch came through the youth ranks at Catalans Dragons. Guasch is by preference a stand-off, but can also play at fullback, as he did in making his first grade début for the Dragons in a 6–14 defeat by Crusaders in 2010's Super League XV. In 2014 he signed for newly promoted Palau Broncos

== Background ==
David Guasch was born in Perpignan, Languedoc-Roussillon, France.
