= Mathias Pala =

Former France international rugby league footballer

Personal information
- Born: 14 June 1989 (age 36) Carpentras, Vaucluse, Provence-Alpes-Côte d'Azur, France

Playing information
- Position: centre, fullback, wing
Club
Years	Team	Pld	T	G	FG	P
2011–15	Catalans Dragons	32	4	0	0	16
2011–15(DR)	→Saint-Esteve XIII Catalan
2015	Leigh Centurions	2	0	0	0	0
	Balmain Tigers
	RC Baho XIII
	Total	34	4	0	0	16
Representative
Years	Team	Pld	T	G	FG	P
2011–16	France	11	4	0	0	16
- Source: As of 18 January 2021

Mathias Pala (born 14 June 1989) is a French rugby league footballer who plays as a centre for RC Baho XIII in the Elite Two Championship. He previously played for the Catalans Dragons in the Super League and their feeder club Saint-Esteve XIII Catalan in the Elite One Championship and English club Leigh Centurions.

== Background ==
Pala was born in Carpentras, France and trained in Limoux.

== Career ==
He has previously played in the Super League for the Catalans Dragons and in Australia with the Balmain Tigers.

He represented France in 2011 against England. He is of Italian descent.

He has also played for France in the 2012 Autumn International Series as well as the 2014 European Cup. Pala returned to the international scene in 2016, playing in a one-off test match against England in Avignon.
