= Vincent Duport =

France international rugby league footballer

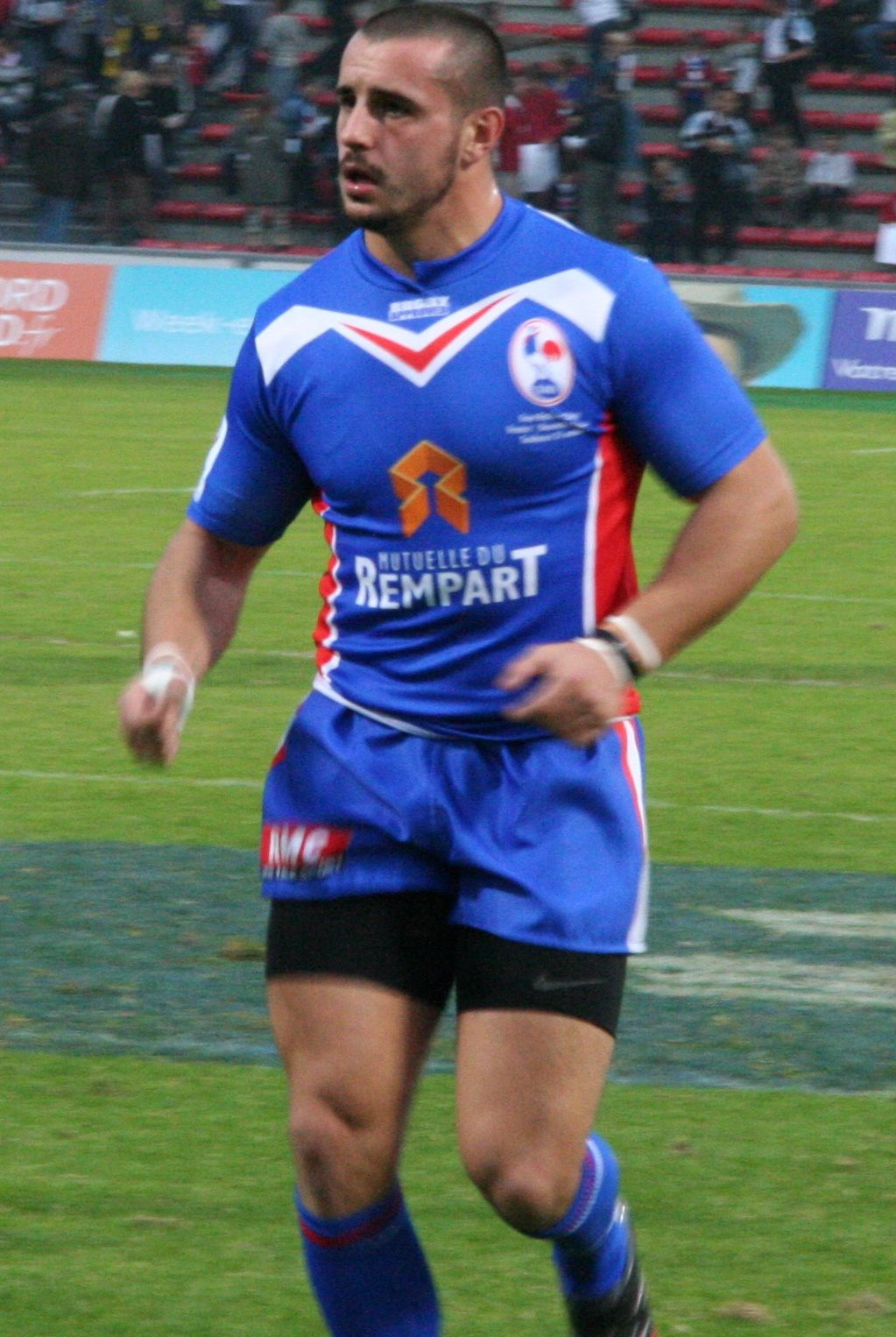

Personal information
- Born: 15 December 1987 (age 38) Toulouse, Midi-Pyrénées, France

Playing information
- Height: 1.84 m (6 ft 0 in)
- Weight: 95 kg (14 st 13 lb)
- Position: Second-row, Centre, Wing
Club
Years	Team	Pld	T	G	FG	P
2007–09	Catalans Dragons	48	17	0	0	68
2008–09	→ UTC (DR)	10	7	0	0	28
2010–11	Toulouse Olympique	12	7	0	0	4
2011–18	Catalans Dragons	150	70	1	0	282
2018–	Lézignan Sangliers	5	10	0	0	0
	Total	225	111	1	0	382
Representative
Years	Team	Pld	T	G	FG	P
2008–16	France	17	5	0	0	12

Vincent Duport (born 15 December 1987) is a French professional rugby league footballer who plays for the Catalans Dragons in the Super League. He was previously playing for Toulouse Olympique in the Co-operative Championship. Primarily a centre but also used to playing in the back row and wing. In his early career, he was highly regarded in France and was one of the “ players to watch “ for France in the 2008 Rugby League World Cup.

== Background ==
Duport was born in Toulouse, Midi-Pyrénées, France.

== Career ==
He was named in the France training squad for the 2008 Rugby League World Cup.

Duport returned to the Catalans Dragons for the remainder of the 2010 season after being granted a release from Toulouse.

On 22 October 2016, Duport returned to international rugby league for the first time since the 2013 Rugby League World Cup. Duport was part of the French team that took on England in an end of year test match in Avignon.
