= Scott Dureau =

Australian rugby league footballer (1986–2026)

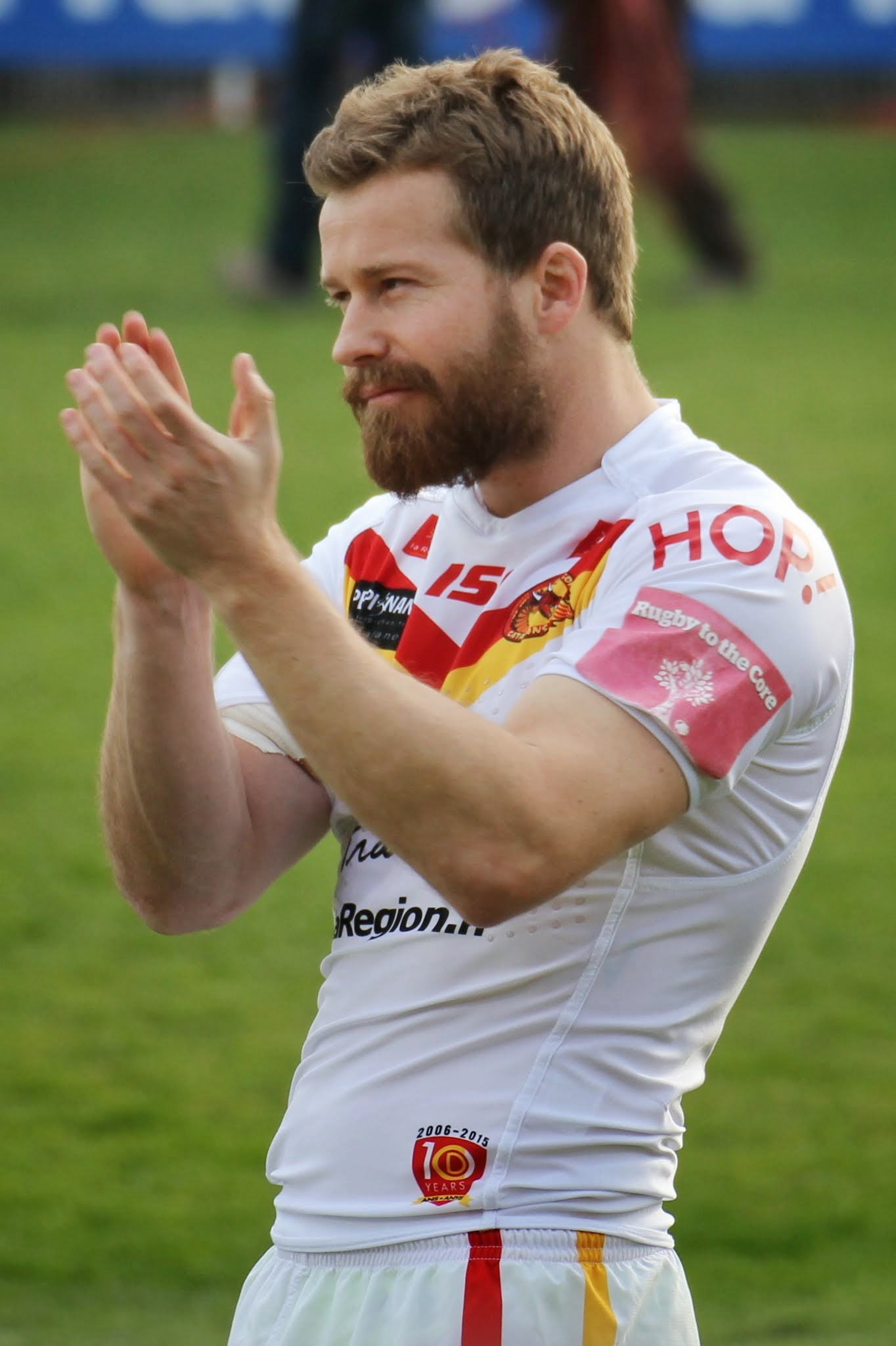

Personal information
- Born: 29 July 1986 Taree, New South Wales, Australia
- Died: 18 July 2026 (aged 39) Australia

Playing information
- Height: 175 cm (5 ft 9 in)
- Weight: 83 kg (13 st 1 lb)
- Position: Halfback
Club
Years	Team	Pld	T	G	FG	P
2007–2010	Newcastle Knights	42	5	12	4	48
2011–2015	Catalans Dragons	97	30	340	11	811
2014	→ Sydney Roosters (loan)	0	0	0	0	0
	Total	139	35	352	15	859
Representative
Years	Team	Pld	T	G	FG	P
2012–13	Exiles	2	1	1	0	6

Scott Dureau (29 July 1986 – 18 July 2026) was an Australian professional rugby league footballer. A goal-kicking halfback, he played for the Catalans Dragons in the Super League and the Newcastle Knights in the National Rugby League (NRL).

== Playing career ==
=== Newcastle Knights ===
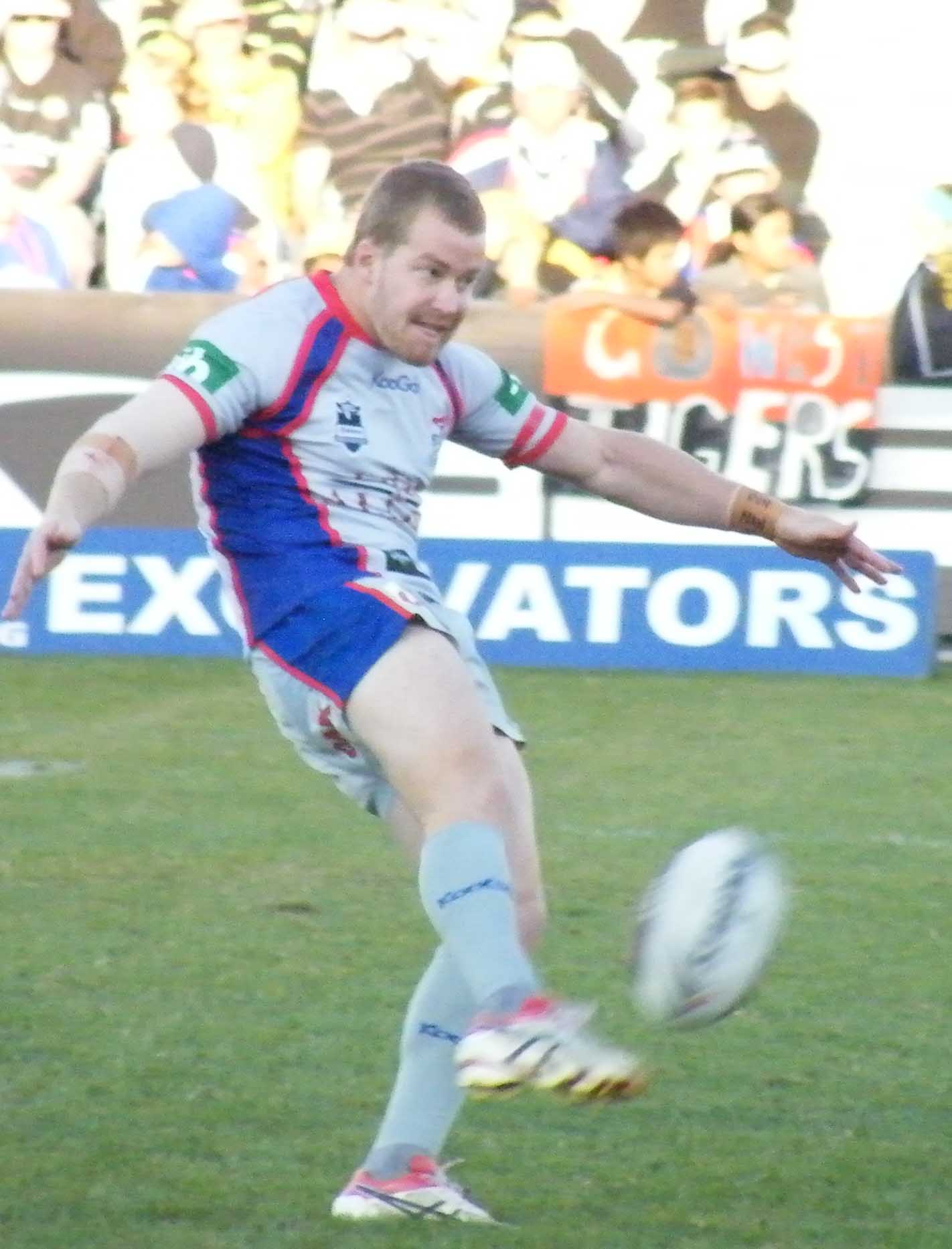
Dureau playing for the Knights in 2009

As a young man, Dureau played his junior football for the Port Macquarie Sharks. In the early 2000s, the Newcastle Knights signed him on a deal that would see him playing in the lower grades. He won various awards at the club before making his debut against the Manly Warringah Sea Eagles at Bluetongue Stadium in 2007.

In July 2010, Dureau was told by Knights coach Rick Stone that it would be in Dureau's best interests to find a new club for 2011, after the signing of young playmaker Beau Henry and the re-signing of Ben Rogers, plus players Jarrod Mullen and Kurt Gidley that also played in the halves.

=== Catalans Dragons ===
Dureau signed with the Catalans Dragons for 2011. He started out at Catalans as the first choice halfback and played for three years with much individual and team success. He was named in the Super League Dream Team in 2011 and 2012, and in 2012 he was awarded the Albert Goldthorpe Medal.

Dureau missed much of the 2013 and 2014 seasons due to surgery to remove a benign tumour behind his eye.

=== Sydney Roosters ===
On 30 June 2014, Dureau signed with the Sydney Roosters mid-season on loan from the Catalans Dragons. However he failed to make an NRL appearance for the club.

=== Return to Catalans ===
In 2015, Dureau returned to the Catalans Dragons in the Super League. Dureau left the club at the end of the 2015 season and subsequently retired from the sport.

== Coaching career ==
Following his retirement as a player, Dureau took up a coaching role with the Newcastle Knights.

== Personal life ==
Dureau was born in Taree, New South Wales, Australia, on 29 July 1986. He died aged 39 on 18 July 2026 after a long illness.

== Career statistics ==
Season	Appearance	Tries	Goals	F/G	Points
2007 Newcastle Knights	1	0	2	0	4
2008 Newcastle Knights	18	1	1	3	9
2009 Newcastle Knights	12	3	4	1	21
2010 Newcastle Knights	11	1	5	0	14
2011 Catalans Dragons	27	12	97	5	247
2012 Catalans Dragons	32	12	131	3	313
2013 Catalans Dragons	10	3	13	1	39
2014 Catalans Dragons	1	0	1	0	2
2015 Catalans Dragons	27	3	98	2	210
Total	139	35	352	15	859
