= Jason Baitieri =

France international rugby league footballer

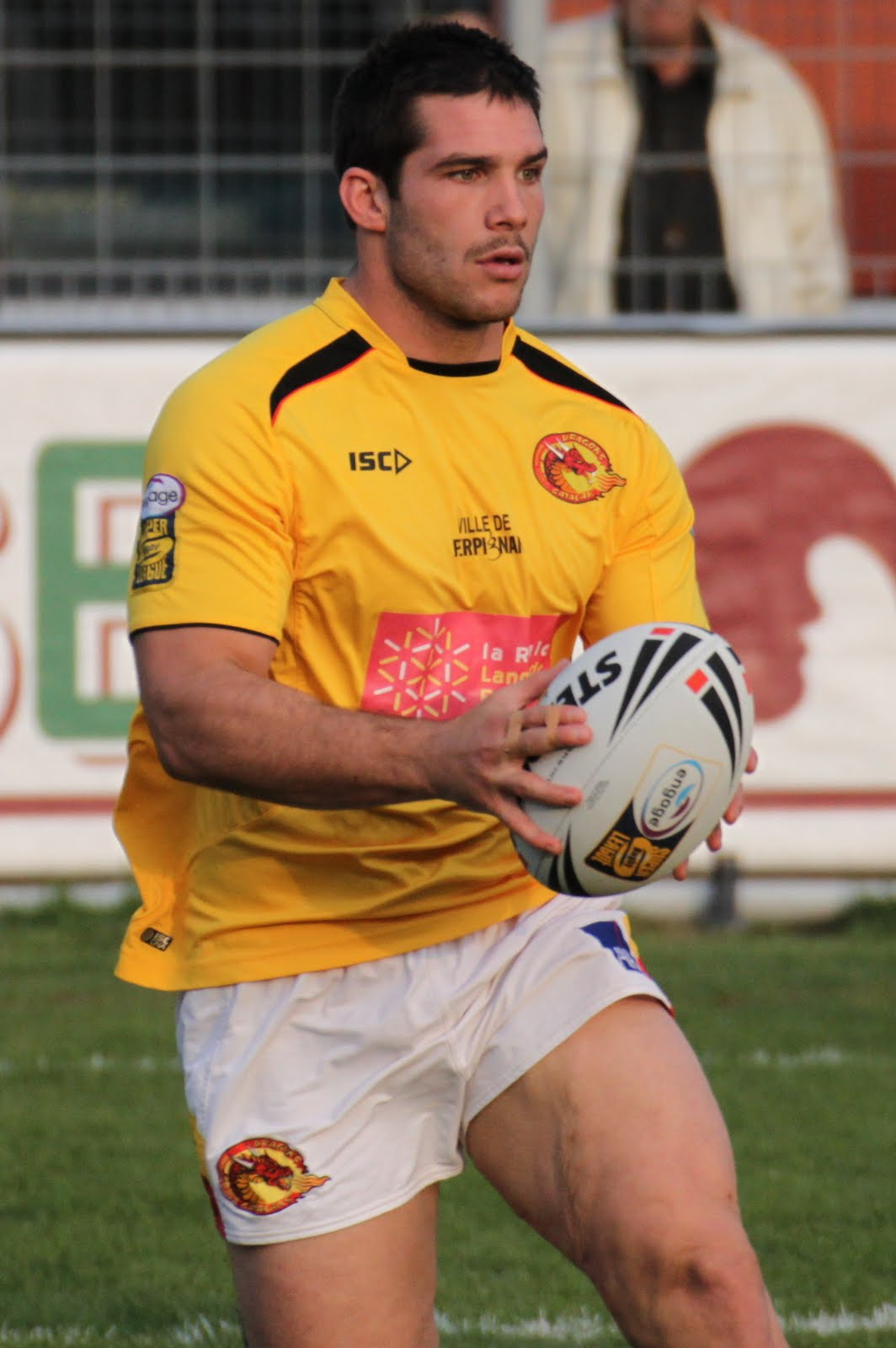

Personal information
- Born: 2 July 1989 (age 37) Paris, Clamart, France
- Height: 5 ft 10 in (1.78 m)
- Weight: 14 st 2 lb (90 kg)

Playing information
- Position: Loose forward
Club
Years	Team	Pld	T	G	FG	P
2010	Sydney Roosters	1	0	0	0	0
2011–21	Catalans Dragons	253	22	0	0	88
2014(loan)	→ Saint-Esteve	3	2	0	0	4
2022–23	FC Lézignan XIII	30	5	0	0	20
2023	Bradford Bulls	11	0	0	0	0
2023	Pia Donkeys	12	5	0	0	20
	Total	310	34	0	0	132
Representative
Years	Team	Pld	T	G	FG	P
2010–	France	22	2	0	0	8
2019–	France 9s	3	0	0	0	0
- Source: As of 12 October 2023

Jason Baitieri (born 2 July 1989) is a France international rugby league footballer who retired professionally at the end of the 2021 season with the Catalans Dragons after 11 years with the club and over 250 appearances. Jason captained his country of birth France on multiple occasions including the 2017 Rugby League World Cup and the Inaugural Rugby League World Cup 9s competition.

He has previously played for the Sydney Roosters in the NRL, as well as bradford Bulls in the RFL Championship . Jason is now head of Recruitment for the Baroudeurs de Pia XIII who play in the French FFR13 Elite 1 competition

== Background ==
Baitieri was born in Paris, France to an Australian father Tas, a former professional rugby league footballer and coach, and a French mother.

He played his junior rugby league in Toulouse before returning to Castle Hill, New South Wales when he was 8, where he played for the Hills District Bulls.

Baiteri was educated at Oakhill College, Castle Hill and represented the 2007 Australian Schoolboys.

== Playing career ==
=== Sydney Roosters / Newtown Jets ===
Baitieri joined the Sydney Roosters via their feeder club, the Newtown Jets. He made his NRL debut against the Wests Tigers in May 2010.

=== Catalans Dragons ===
In August 2010, he joined the Catalans Dragons on a two-year contract.

In July 2015, Baitieri extended his contract with Catalans for a further two years.

He played in the 2018 Challenge Cup Final victory over the Warrington Wolves at Wembley Stadium.

=== Pia Donkeys ===
On 11 Oct 2023 it was reported that he left Bradford Bulls at the end of the 2023 season and will be returning to France to play for Pia Donkeys ready for the Elite One Championship 2023–2024 season.

== International career ==
Baitieri made his international debut for France in the 2010 European Cup. He also played in a friendly international against England in 2011, 2012 Autumn International Series and he captained his country for the first time in their 2014 European Cup campaign.

After missing France's first match of the 2015 European Cup and test-match with England due to injury, Jason returned to captain France in their European Cup match against Wales.

He was selected in France 9s squad for the 2019 Rugby League World Cup 9s.
