= List of Catalans Dragons players =

The following is a list of players who have played for the Catalans Dragons in one or more first team games (Super League or Challenge Cup) since the club joined the British rugby league system in 2006. Players are listed in order of debut and statistics are correct as of the end of the 2011 season.

== Players ==
No.	Name	Position	Nationality	Club career	Appearances	Tries	Goals	DG	Points
1	Laurent Frayssinous	FB/SO	(France)	2006	19	4	37	0	90
2	Justin Murphy	WG	(Australia)	2006–08	66	54	0	0	216
3	Teddy Sadaoui	CN	(France)	2006	7	0	0	0	0
4	John Wilson	CN	(Australia)	2006–08	77	25	0	0	100
5	Mark Hughes	CN	(Australia)	2006	26	11	0	0	44
6	Sean Rudder	SO	(Australia)	2006	26	7	0	0	28
7	Stacey Jones	SH	(New Zealand)	2006–07	45	12	49	4	150
8	Chris Beattie	PR	(Australia)	2006	29	4	0	0	16
9	Julien Rinaldi	HK	(France)	2006	25	2	1	0	10
10	Adel Fellous	PR	(France)	2006–07	42	5	0	0	20
11	Jérôme Guisset	PR/SR	(France)	2006–10	141	11	0	1	45
12	Jamal Fakir	SR	(Morocco)	2006–14	115	13	0	0	52
13	Ian Hindmarsh	SR/LF	(Australia)	2006	27	3	0	0	12
14	Grégory Mounis	LF	(France)	2006–16	164	23	18	0	128
15	Renaud Guigue	FB	(France)	2006	21	3	0	0	12
16	Pascal Jampy	SR/LF	(France)	2006	13	0	0	0	0
17	Alex Chan	PR	(New Zealand)	2006–08	86	12	0	0	48
18	Bruno Verges	WG	(France)	2006	28	9	0	0	36
19	Julien Touxagas	SR	(France)	2006–11	65	6	0	0	24
20	Thomas Bosc	SO/SH	(France)	2006–17	122	36	344	5	837
21	Michael Dobson	SH	(Australia)	2006	12	5	41	1	103
22	Lionel Teixido	HK	(France)	2006–07	28	4	0	0	16
23	David Berthezène	HK	(France)	2006–07	21	0	0	0	0
24	Rémi Casty	PR	(France)	2006–20	337	34	0	0	136
25	Frédéric Zitter	WG	(France)	2006	2	2	0	0	8
26	Aurélien Cologni	HK	(France)	2006	5	3	0	0	12
27	Sébastien Martins	PR	(France)	2006, 2009–11	22	2	0	0	8
28	Younes Khattabi	WG	(Morocco)	2006–08	32	11	0	0	44
29	Mathieu Griffi	PR	(France)	2006–08	29	0	0	0	0
30	Cyrille Gossard	SR	(France)	2006–12	93	9	0	0	36
31	Clint Greenshields	FB	(Australia) (France)	2007–12	146	85	0	0	340
32	Adam Mogg	CN/SO	(Australia)	2007–10	84	25	0	1	101
33	Vincent Duport	WG/CN	(France)	2007–09, 2011–18	198	87	0	0	348
34	Dimitri Pelo	WG	(New Caledonia) (France)	2007–10	87	38	0	0	152
35	Casey McGuire	HK/SO	(Australia)	2007–10	99	29	1	0	118
36	Aaron Gorrell	HK	(Australia)	2007–08	24	6	14	0	52
37	Sébastien Raguin	SR	(France)	2007–12	137	29	0	0	116
38	Jason Croker	SR	(Australia)	2007–09	62	12	0	1	49
39	David Ferriol	PR	(France)	2007–12	144	10	0	0	40
40	Luke Quigley	HK	(Australia)	2007	20	1	0	0	4
41	Andrew Bentley	SR	(New Zealand) (France) (Scotland)	2007–10	29	3	0	0	12
42	Kane Bentley	HK	(New Zealand) (France) (Scotland)	2007–10	39	6	0	0	24
43	Olivier Charles	WG	(France)	2007	2	2	0	0	8
44	Cyril Stacul	WG	(France)	2007–12	67	21	0	0	84
45	Dane Carlaw	LF	(Australia)	2008–10	81	12	0	0	48
46	Jean-Philippe Baile	CN	(France)	2008–14	67	24	0	0	96
47	Olivier Elima	SR	(France)	2008–10	72	34	0	0	136
48	Florian Quintilla	CN	(France)	2008–09	6	0	0	0	0
49	Steven Bell	CN	(Australia)	2009–10	49	17	0	0	68
50	Shane Perry	SH	(Australia)	2009	16	1	0	0	4
51	Jason Ryles	PR	(Australia)	2009	22	2	0	0	8
52	Greg Bird	SO/LF	(Australia)	2009	83	13	3	0	58
53	Setaimata Sa	CN/SR	(Samoa) (New Zealand)	2010–12	69	24	0	0	96
54	Dallas Johnson	LF	(Australia)	2010	28	1	0	0	4
55	Chris Walker	WG	(Australia)	2010	12	6	2	0	28
56	William Barthau	SH	(France)	2010–14	19	6	22	0	68
57	David Guasch	FB	(France)	2010–14	1	0	0	0	0
58	Tony Gigot	FB/SO	(France)	2010–11	25	1	3	0	10
59	Frédéric Vaccari	WG	(France)	2010–14	37	20	0	0	80
60	Mickaël Simon	PR	(France)	2010–20	31	1	0	0	4
61	Brent Sherwin	SH	(Australia)	2010	14	1	0	1	5
62	Damien Blanch	WG	(Australia) (Ireland)	2011–present	30	21	0	0	84
63	Ben Farrar	CE	(Australia)	2011	14	3	0	0	12
64	Scott Dureau	SH	(Australia)	2011–15	27	11	95	5	239
65	Lopini Paea	PR	(Australia) (Tonga)	2011–14	21	3	0	0	12
66	Ian Henderson	HK	(England) (Scotland)	2011–15	31	6	0	0	24
67	Steve Menzies	SR	(Australia)	2011–13	23	14	0	0	56
68	Éloi Pélissier	HK	(France)	2011–16	154	27	0	1	109
69	Daryl Millard	CN/WG	(Australia) (Fiji)	2011–14	99	41	1	0	166
70	Jason Baitieri	LF	(France)	2011–22	250	22	0	0	88
71	Mathias Pala	WG/CN	(France)	2011–15	32	4	0	0	16
72	Thibaut Ancely	SR	(France)	2011	2	0	0	0	0
73	Rémy Marginet	SH	(France)	2011	2	0	9	0	18
74	Louis Anderson	SR	(New Zealand)	2012–18	143	35	0	0	140
75	Ben Fisher	HK	(Australia) (Scotland)	2012	15	2	0	0	8
76	Leon Pryce	SO	(England)	2012–14	80	30	0	0	120
77	Damien Cardace	WG	(France)	2012–15	26	17	1	0	70
78	Julian Bousquet	PR	(France)	2012–	225	25	0	0	100
79	Kevin Larroyer	SR	(France)	2012–13	22	10	0	0	40
80	Antoni Maria	PR	(France)	2012–16	41	1	0	0	4
81	Brent Webb	FB	(New Zealand)	2013–14	10	2	0	0	8
82	Zeb Taia	SR	(New Zealand) (Cook Islands)	2013–15	81	38	0	0	152
83	Morgan Escaré	FB	(France)	2013–16	91	65	1	2	264
84	Elliott Whitehead	SR	(England)	2013–15	68	32	0	0	128
85	Thibaut Margalet	LF	(France)	2013–19	28	0	0	0	0
86	Benjamin Garcia	SR/CE	(France)	2013–	189	33	0	0	132
87	Michael Oldfield	WG	(Australia) (Tonga)	2014–15	45	29	0	0	116
88	Ben Pomeroy	CN	(Australia)	2014–15	47	11	0	0	44
89	Jeff Lima	PR	(New Zealand) (Samoa)	2014–15	46	3	1	0	14
90	Gadwin Springer	PR	(French Guiana) (France)	2014–15	4	1	0	0	4
91	Joan Guasch	HK	(France)	2014–15	9	0	0	0	0
92	Sam Williams	SH	(Australia)	2014	12	4	21	0	58
93	Willie Tonga	CN	(Australia)	2015	19	6	0	0	24
94	Todd Carney	SO	(Australia)	2015–16	33	9	4	1	45
95	Stanislas Robin	SO	(France)	2015–16	11	2	0	1	9
96	Fouad Yaha	WG	(France)	2015–	149	100	0	0	400
97	Krisnan Inu	WG/CN	(New Zealand) (Samoa)	2015–17	47	16	6	0	76
98	Jordan Sigismeau	WG	(Réunion) (France)	2015–16	10	4	0	0	16
99	Lucas Albert	SH	(France)	2015–20	56	8	28	0	88
100	Ugo Perez	SR	(France)	2015–18	8	0	0	0	0
101	Pat Richards	WG	(Australia) (Ireland)	2016	21	9	76	0	188
102	Richie Myler	SH	(England)	2016–17	47	25	2	0	104
103	Paul Aiton	HK	(Papua New Guinea)	2016–18	48	3	0	0	12
104	Glenn Stewart	SR	(Australia)	2016	30	3	0	0	12
105	Justin Horo	SR	(New Zealand)	2016–17	42	12	0	0	48
106	Dave Taylor	PR	(Australia)	2016	29	9	0	0	36
107	Jodie Broughton	WG	(England)	2016–19	52	38	0	0	152
108	Willie Mason	PR	(Australia) (Tonga)	2016	16	1	0	0	4
109	Alrix Da Costa	HK	(France)	2016–	95	4	0	0	12
110	Romain Navarrete	PR	(France)	2016–17	15	0	0	0	0
111	Jordan Dezaria	PR	(France)	2016–17	5	0	0	0	0
112	Paul Séguier	PR	(France)	2016–	8	0	0	0	0
113	Brayden Wiliame	CN	(Australia) (Fiji)	2017–19	77	35	0	0	140
114	Luke Walsh	SO	(Australia)	2017–18	47	12	99	4	214
115	Sam Moa	PR	(Tonga) (New Zealand)	2017–20	80	8	0	0	32
116	Iain Thornley	CN	(England)	2017–18	38	9	0	0	36
117	Luke Burgess	PR	(England)	2017	5	0	0	0	0
118	Lambert Belmas	PR	(France)	2017–21	18	0	0	0	0
119	Arthur Romano	CN	(France)	2017–	19	3	0	0	12
?	Matthieu Khedimi	HK	(France)	2017	1	0	0	0	0
120	Nabil Djalout	SR	(France)	2017	1	0	0	0	0
121	Lewis Tierney	FB	(England) (Scotland)	2017–20	66	22	0	0	88
122	David Mead	Fullback	(Papua New Guinea)	2018-2020	58	29	0	0	116
123	Samisoni Langi	Centre, Stand-off	(Tonga)	2018-	107	27	0	0	108
124	Michael McIlorum	Hooker	(England) (Ireland)	2018-	96	8	0	0	32
125	Benjamin Julien	Second-row, Centre	(France)	2018-	88	16	0	0	64
126	Josh Drinkwater	Scrum-half, Stand-off	(Australia)	2018, 2020-	84	17	83	0	234
127	Mickaël Goudemand	Second-row, Loose forward	(France)	2017-	82	9	0	0	36
128	Kenny Edwards	Second-row	(New Zealand)	2018-2019	36	10	0	0	40
129	Robin Brochon	Fullback, Wing	(France)	2018-21	3	0	0	0	0
130	Ugo Martin	Wing	(France)	2018-2020	1	0	0	0	0
131	Arthur Mourgue	Scrum-half, Stand-off, Fullback	(France)	2018-	47	11	42	0	128
132	Sam Tomkins	Scrum-half, Stand-off, Fullback	(England)	2019-	82	28	134	4	384
133	Matty Smith	Scrum-half, Hooker, Stand-off	(England)	2019	16	0	0	1	1
134	Matt Whitley	Second-row	(England)	2019-	78	28	0	0	112
135	Sam Kasiano	Prop	(New Zealand) (Samoa)	2019-22	83	13	0	0	52
136	James Maloney	Stand-off, Scrum-half	(Australia)	2020-21	42	8	184	5	405
137	Joel Tomkins	Second-row, Centre, Loose forward	(England)	2020-	15	3	0	0	12
138	Israel Folau	Centre, Wing	(Australia)	2020	15	5	0	0	20
139	Tom Davies	Wing	(England)	2020-	58	36	0	0	144
140	Dean Whare	Centre, Wing, Fullback	(New Zealand)	2021-22	38	6	0	0	24
141	Mathieu Laguerre	Centre	(France)	2021-	23	14	0	0	56
142	Mike McMeeken	Second-row	(England)	2021-	39	12	0	0	48
143	Gil Dudson	Prop	(Wales)	2021-22	39	7	0	0	28
