= 2006 Catalans Dragons season =

- Super League XI Rank: 12th
- Play-off result: Did not qualify
- Challenge Cup: Quarter-final
- 2006 record: Wins: 10; draws: 0; losses: 21
- Points scored: For: 711; against: 966

Team information
- Chairman: Bernard Guasch
- Head Coach: Michael Potter (was David Waite)
- Captain: Stacey Jones
- Stadium: Stade Aimé Giral
- Avg. attendance: 6,163
- High attendance: 11,000 vs. Wigan Warriors

Top scorers
- Tries: Justin Murphy (28)
- Goals: Michael Dobson (41)
- Points: Justin Murphy (112)
List of seasons	2007 →

This article details the Catalans Dragons rugby league football club's 2006 season. This is their 1st season in the Super League. Catalans won their first Super League match 38-30 at home against Wigan Warriors in front of 11,000 people.

== Table ==
Pos	Team	Pld	W	D	L	PF	PA	PD	Pts	Qualification
1	St Helens (L, C)	28	24	0	4	939	430	+509	48	Semi-final
2	Hull F.C.	28	20	0	8	720	578	+142	40	Semi-final
3	Leeds Rhinos	28	19	0	9	869	543	+326	38	Elimination play-offs
4	Bradford Bulls	28	16	2	10	802	568	+234	32 (Note: Bradford deducted 2 points for salary cap breaches in 2005.)	Elimination play-offs
5	Salford City Reds	28	13	0	15	600	539	+61	26	Elimination play-offs
6	Warrington Wolves	28	13	0	15	743	721	+22	26	Elimination play-offs
7	Harlequins	28	11	1	16	556	823	−267	23	
8	Wigan Warriors	28	12	0	16	644	715	−71	22 (Note: Wigan deducted 2 points for salary cap breaches in 2005.)	
9	Huddersfield Giants	28	11	0	17	609	753	−144	22	
10	Wakefield Trinity Wildcats	28	10	0	18	591	717	−126	20	
11	Castleford Tigers (R)	28	9	1	18	575	968	−393	19	Relegation to National League One
12	Catalans Dragons (X)	28	8	0	20	601	894	−293	16	

Source: Rugby League Project
Rules for classification: 1) Points; 2) Points difference; 3) Number of points scored;
(C) Champions; (L) League Leaders' Shield Winners; (R) Relegated; (X) Exempt from relegation

== Milestones ==
- Round 1: Laurent Frayssinous, Justin Murphy, Teddy Sadaoui, John Wilson, Mark Hughes, Sean Rudder, Stacey Jones, Chris Beattie, Julien Rinaldi, Adel Fellous, Jérôme Guisset, Jamal Fakir, Ian Hindmarsh, Grégory Mounis, Renaud Guigue, Pascal Jampy and Alex Chan made their debut for the Dragons.
- Round 1: Justin Murphy, Jamal Fakir, Laurent Frayssinous, Renaud Guigue, Ian Hindmarsh and Mark Hughes scored their 1st try for the Dragons.
- Round 1: Laurent Frayssinous kicked his 1st goal for the Dragons.
- Round 2: Bruno Verges and Julien Touxagas made their debut for the Dragons.
- Round 3: Thomas Bosc made his debut for the Dragons.
- Round 3: Chris Beattie, Thomas Bosc and John Wilson scored their 1st try for the Dragons.
- Round 4: Grégory Mounis scored his 1st try for the Dragons.
- Round 5: Michael Dobson and Lionel Teixido made their debut for the Dragons.
- Round 5: Michael Dobson scored his 1st try for the Dragons.
- Round 6: David Berthezène made his debut for the Dragons.
- Round 6: Adel Fellous and Lionel Teixido scored their 1st try for the Dragons.
- Round 6: Michael Dobson kicked his 1st goal for the Dragons.
- Round 7: Alex Chan scored his 1st try for the Dragons.
- CCR4: Frédéric Zitter and Rémi Casty made their debut for the Dragons.
- CCR4: Rémi Casty, Frédéric Zitter, Sean Rudder and Bruno Verges scored their 1st try for the Dragons.
- Round 8: Jérôme Guisset scored his 1st try for the Dragons.
- Round 8: Bruno Verges scored his 1st hat-trick for the Dragons.
- Round 8: Michael Dobson kicked his 1st drop goal for the Dragons.
- Round 9: Julien Rinaldi kicked his 1st goal for the Dragons.
- Round 10: Aurélien Cologni and Sébastien Martins made their debut for the Dragons.
- Round 10: Aurélien Cologni scored his 1st try for the Dragons.
- Round 14: John Wilson scored his 1st hat-trick for the Dragons.
- CCR5: Michael Dobson reached 100 points for the Dragons.
- Round 15: Stacey Jones scored his 1st try for the Dragons.
- Round 16: Julien Rinaldi scored his 1st try for the Dragons.
- Round 17: Younes Khattabi made his debut for the Dragons.
- Round 17: Stacey Jones kicked his 1st goal for the Dragons.
- Round 20: Justin Murphy scored his 1st hat-trick for the Dragons.
- Round 22: Mathieu Griffi made his debut for the Dragons.
- Round 25: Cyrille Gossard made his debut for the Dragons.
- Round 25: Justin Murphy scored his 25th try and reached 100 points for the Dragons.
- Round 25: Thomas Bosc kicked his 1st goal for the Dragons.

== Fixtures and results ==
LEGEND
Win
Draw
Loss

2006 Super League

Date	Competition	Rnd	Vrs	H/A	Venue	Result	Score	Tries	Goals	Att	Report
11 February 2006	Super League XI	1	Wigan Warriors	H	Stade Aimé Giral	W	38-30	Murphy (2), Fakir, Frayssinous, Guigue, Hindmarsh, Hughes	Frayssinous 5/7	11,000	Report
17 February 2006	Super League XI	2	Salford City Reds	A	The Willows	L	0-16	-	-	4,660	Report
26 February 2006	Super League XI	3	Castleford Tigers	A	Wheldon Road	L	28-34	Beattie, Bosc, Fakir, Guigue, Wilson	Frayssinous 4/5	5,825	Report
4 March 2006	Super League XI	4	Bradford Bulls	H	Stade Aimé Giral	L	18-50	Mounis (2), Murphy	Frayssinous 3/3	9,373	Report
11 March 2006	Super League XI	5	Leeds Rhinos	H	Stade Aimé Giral	L	10-58	Dobson, Murphy	Frayssinous 1/1, Bosc 0/1	5,783	Report
18 March 2006	Super League XI	6	Warrington Wolves	A	Halliwell Jones Stadium	W	28-26	Murphy (2), Bosc, Fellous, Teixido	Dobson 4/5	9,631	Report
25 March 2006	Super League XI	7	Salford City Reds	H	Stade Aimé Giral	L	22-28	Hughes (2), Chan, Wilson	Dobson 3/4	6,547	Report
8 April 2006	Super League XI	8	Castleford Tigers	H	Stade Albert Domec	W	51-14	Verges (3), Guisset (2), Hughes (2), Bosc, Murphy	Dobson 7/9, Dobson 1 DG	6,109	Report
14 April 2006	Super League XI	9	Harlequins RL	A	Twickenham Stoop	L	14-36	Hughes, Murphy, Rudder	Dobson 0/1, Rinaldi 1/2	3,472	Report
17 April 2006	Super League XI	10	St Helens R.F.C.	H	Stade Aimé Giral	L	20-34	Cologni, Dobson, Wilson	Dobson 4/4	8,294	Report
22 April 2006	Super League XI	11	Hull F.C.	H	Stade Aimé Giral	L	28-34	Dobson, Fakir, Mounis, Murphy, Rudder	Dobson 4/5	6,877	Report
28 April 2006	Super League XI	12	Bradford Bulls	A	Odsal Stadium	L	6-54	Rudder	Dobson 1/1	10,522	Report
6 May 2006	Super League XI	13	Warrington Wolves	H	Stade Aimé Giral	L	16-44	Murphy (2), Fakir	Dobson 2/3	5,877	Report
14 May 2006	Super League XI	14	Castleford Tigers	A	Wheldon Road	W	40-18	Wilson (3), Cologni, Dobson, Hindmarsh, Murphy	Dobson 6/7	6,024	Report
27 May 2006	Super League XI	15	Wakefield Trinity Wildcats	H	Stade Aimé Giral	W	28-20	Frayssinous (2), Fakir, Fellous, Jones	Frayssinous 4/5	6,825	Report
11 June 2006	Super League XI	16	Huddersfield Giants	A	Galpharm Stadium	L	34-42	Murphy (2), Chan, Guigue, Rinaldi, Wilson	Frayssinous 5/6	14,017	Report
18 June 2006	Super League XI	17	Wigan Warriors	A	JJB Stadium	L	18-24	Beattie, Verges, Wilson	Jones 2/2, Frayssinous 1/1	11,250	Report
24 June 2006	Super League XI	18	Harlequins RL	H	Stade Aimé Giral	W	38-18	Murphy (2), Cologni, Hughes, Mounis, Verges	Jones 7/7	4,197	Report
1 July 2006	Super League XI	19	Hull F.C.	H	Parc des Sports Et de l'Amitié	L	16-24	Hindmarsh, Jones, Murphy	Jones 2/3	4,479	Report
7 July 2006	Super League XI	20	St Helens R.F.C.	A	Knowsley Road	L	26-52	Murphy (3), Rudder (2)	Frayssinous 3/5	8,058	Report
14 July 2006	Super League XI	21	Bradford Bulls	A	Odsal Stadium	L	16-30	Chan, Mounis, Verges	Jones 2/3	10,388	Report
22 July 2006	Super League XI	22	Salford City Reds	H	Parc des Sports Et de l'Amitié	W	26-6	Murphy (2), Beattie, Jones, Rudder	Jones 3/5	5,070	Report
4 August 2006	Super League XI	23	Wigan Warriors	A	JJB Stadium	L	4-40	Bosc	Jones 0/1	12,647	Report
13 August 2006	Super League XI	24	Wakefield Trinity Wildcats	A	Belle Vue	L	14-34	Hughes, Jones	Jones 3/3	3,324	Report
19 August 2006	Super League XI	25	St Helens R.F.C.	H	Stade Saint-Michel	W	26-22	Murphy (2), Jones, Mounis, Teixido	Jones 2/4, Bosc 1/1	4,551	Report
3 September 2006	Super League XI	26	Hull F.C.	A	KC Stadium	L	12-26	Bosc, Jones	Frayssinous 2/2	10,300	Report
9 September 2006	Super League XI	27	Huddersfield Giants	H	Stade Aimé Giral	L	12-20	Murphy, Rinaldi	Frayssinous 2/2	6,463	Report
15 September 2006	Super League XI	28	Leeds Rhinos	A	Headingley Stadium	L	12-60	Bosc, Murphy	Frayssinous 2/2	13,391	Report

== Player appearances ==
- Super League only

FB=Fullback	C=Centre	W=Winger	SO=Stand-off	SH=Scrum half	PR=Prop	H=Hooker	SR=Second Row	L=Loose forward	B=Bench

No	Player	1	2	3	4	5	6	7	8	9	10	11	12	13	14	15	16	17	18	19	20	21	22	23	24	25	26	27	28
1	Renaud Guigue	B	B	C	B				B	FB	FB	x	x	x	FB	FB	FB	FB	FB	FB	C	FB	FB	FB	FB				
2	Justin Murphy	W	W	W	W	W	W	W	W	W	W	W	W	W	W	W	W	W	W	W	W	W	W	W	W	W	W	W	W
3	John Wilson	C	C	C	C	C	C	C	C	L	C	C	C	C	C	C	C	C	C	C	C	C	C	C	C	SO			
4	Mark Hughes	W	C	FB	C		C	C	C	C	C	C	C	C	C	C	C		C			C	C	C	C	C	C	C	x
5	Bruno Verges		W	W	W	W	W	W	W	W		W	W	W	W	W	W	W	W	W	W	W	W		W	W	W	W	W
6	Laurent Frayssinous	FB	FB	SH	SH	FB							FB	FB	SO	SO	SO	B	B		FB						SO	SO	SO
7	Stacey Jones	SH	SH													SH	SH	SH	SH	SH	SH	SH	SH	SH	SH	SH	SH	SH	SH
8	Chris Beattie	P	P	P	P	P	B	B	P	P	P	P	P	B	B	x	P	P	P	P	P	P	P	P	P	P	P	P	B
9	David Berthezène	x	x	x	x	x	B	B	B	B	H	H	H	B	x	B	B	x	B	B	B	H			B	x	B	B	H
10	Jérôme Guisset	SR	SR	SR	SR	SR	P	P	P	P	B	SR	L	P	P	P		L	SR	P	P	SR	SR	SR	SR	P		P	SR
11	Pascal Jampy	B								B	SR	B	B	SR	L	L				B	B							B	x
12	Ian Hindmarsh	L	L	L	L	SR	SR	SR	SR			L	SR	L	SR	SR	SR	SR		SR	SR	SR	SR	SR	SR	SR	SR	SR	SR
13	Grégory Mounis	B	B	B	B	L	L	L	L	SR	B	B	B		B		B	B	L	L	H	L	L	L	L	L	L	L	L
14	Thomas Bosc	x	x	B	FB	B	FB	FB	FB			FB	x	x	x	x	x	x	x	x	x	x	x	W	x	FB	FB	FB	FB
15	Aurélien Cologni	x	x	x	x	x	x	x	x	x	L	x	x	x	B	x	x	x	H	H	L	x	x	x	x	x	x	x	x
16	Sean Rudder	SO	SO	SO	SO	SO	SO	SO	SO	SO	SO	SO	SO	SO	SR	B	L	C	SO	SO	SO	SO	SO	SO					
17	Frédéric Zitter	x	x	x	x	x	x	x	x	x	W	x	x	x	x	x	x	x	x	x	x	x	x	x	x	x	x	x	x
18	Teddy Sadaoui	C	x	x	x	C	x	x	x	x	x	x	x	x	x	x	x	x	x	x	x	x	x	x	SO	C	C	C	C
19	Alex Chan	B	B	B	P	P	P	P	B			B	B	B	B	B	B	B	B		B	P	P	P	P	B	P	B	B
20	Adel Fellous	P	P	P	B	B	B	B	B	B	P	P	P	P	P	P	P	P	P	B	B	B	B	B	B	x	B	x	P
21	Julien Touxagas	x	B	B	B	x	x	x	x	C	x	x	x	B	x	x	x	x	x	x	x	x	x	x	x	x	B	x	B
22	Jamal Fakir	SR	SR	SR	SR	B	SR	SR	SR	SR	SR	SR	SR	SR		SR	SR	SR	SR	SR	SR	B	B	B	B	SR	SR	SR	B
23	Sébastien Martins	x	x	x	x	x	x	x	x	x	B	x	x	x	x	x	x	x	x	x	x	x	x	x	x	x	x	x	x
24	Rémi Casty	x	x	x	x	x	x	x	x	B	x	x	x	x	x	B	B	B	B	B	x	B	x	x	x	x	x	x	x
25	Julien Rinaldi	H	H	H	H	H	H	H	H	H		B	B	H	H	H	H	H				B	B	B	x	B	H	H	x
27	Lionel Teixido	x	x	x	x	B	B	B	x	x	B	x	x	x	x	x	x	x	x	x	x	x	H	H	H	H	x	x	x
28	Michael Dobson	x	x	x	x	SH	SH	SH	SH	SH	SH	SH	SH	SH	SH	x	x	x	x	x	x	x	x	x	x	x	x	x	x
29	Younes Khattabi	x	x	x	x	x	x	x	x	x	x	x	x	x	x	x	x	SO	x	C	x	x	x	x	x	x	x	x	C
30	Mathieu Griffi	x	x	x	x	x	x	x	x	x	x	x	x	x	x	x	x	x	x	x	x	x	B	B	B	B	B	B	P
31	Cyrille Gossard	x	x	x	x	x	x	x	x	x	x	x	x	x	x	x	x	x	x	x	x	x	x	x	x	B	x	x	x

= Injured

= Suspended

== Challenge Cup ==
LEGEND
Win
Draw
Loss

Date	Competition	Rnd	Vrs	H/A	Venue	Result	Score	Tries	Goals	Att	TV	Report
1 April 2006	Cup	4th	Thornhill Trojans	H	Stade Jean-Laffon	W	66-0	Casty (2), Hughes (2), Zitter (2), Beattie, Fakir, Mounis, Rudder, Teixido, Verges	Dobson 5/7, Frayssinous 4/5	1,000	-	Report
21 May 2006	Cup	5th	Widnes Vikings	A	Halton Stadium	W	34-16	Verges (2), Dobson, Frayssinous, Hughes, Murphy	Dobson 5/6	3,014	-	Report
3 June 2006	Cup	QF	St Helens R.F.C.	A	Knowsley Road	L	10-56	Jones, Murphy	Frayssinous 1/2	8,319	-	Report

== Player appearances ==
- Challenge Cup games only

FB=Fullback	C=Centre	W=Winger	SO=Stand Off	SH=Scrum half	P=Prop	H=Hooker	SR=Second Row	L=Loose forward	B=Bench

No	Player	4	5	QF
1	Renaud Guigue	FB	FB	FB
2	Justin Murphy	x	W	W
3	John Wilson	C	C	C
4	Mark Hughes	C	C	C
5	Bruno Verges	W	W	W
6	Laurent Frayssinous	B	SO	SO
7	Stacey Jones			SH
8	Chris Beattie	P	x	B
9	David Berthezène	x	B	B
10	Jérôme Guisset	SR	P	P
11	Pascal Jampy		L	SR
12	Ian Hindmarsh	x	SR	L
13	Grégory Mounis	L		
14	Thomas Bosc	x	x	x
15	Aurélien Cologni	x	x	x
16	Sean Rudder	SO	B	B
17	Frédéric Zitter	W	x	x
18	Teddy Sadaoui	x	x	x
19	Alex Chan	x	B	B
20	Adel Fellous	P	P	P
21	Julien Touxagas	B	x	x
22	Jamal Fakir	SR	SR	SR
23	Sébastien Martins	x	x	x
24	Rémi Casty	B	B	x
25	Julien Rinaldi	H	H	H
27	Lionel Teixido	B	x	x
28	Michael Dobson	SH	SH	x

== Squad statistics ==
- Appearances and Points include (Super League, Challenge Cup and Play-offs) as of 15 September 2006.

No	Player	Position	Age	Previous club	Apps	Tries	Goals	DG	Points
1	Renaud Guigue	Fullback	27	Catalans Dragons Academy	21	3	0	0	12
2	Justin Murphy	Wing	27	Widnes Vikings	30	28	0	0	112
3	John Wilson	Centre	28	Wests Tigers	28	8	0	0	32
4	Mark Hughes	Centre	29	Newcastle Knights	26	11	0	0	44
5	Bruno Verges	Wing	30	Catalans Dragons Academy	28	9	0	0	36
6	Laurent Frayssinous	Stand off	29	Villeneuve Leopards	19	4	37	0	90
7	Stacey Jones	Scrum half	30	New Zealand Warriors	17	7	21	0	70
8	Chris Beattie	Prop	30	Cronulla Sharks	29	4	0	0	16
9	David Berthezène	Hooker	25	Catalans Dragons Academy	20	0	0	0	0
10	Jérôme Guisset	Prop	28	Wigan Warriors	29	2	0	0	8
11	Pascal Jampy	Second row	33	Paris St-Germain	13	0	0	0	0
12	Ian Hindmarsh	Second row	29	Canberra Raiders	27	3	0	0	12
13	Grégory Mounis	Loose forward	21	Catalans Dragons Academy	27	7	0	0	28
14	Thomas Bosc	Stand off	23	Catalans Dragons Academy	12	6	1	0	26
15	Aurélien Cologni	Loose forward	28	Catalans Dragons Academy	5	3	0	0	12
16	Sean Rudder	Stand off	27	Castleford Tigers	26	7	0	0	28
17	Frédéric Zitter	Wing	26	Barrow Raiders	2	2	0	0	8
18	Teddy Sadaoui	Centre	23	Catalans Dragons Academy	7	0	0	0	0
19	Alex Chan	Prop	31	Melbourne Storm	27	3	0	0	12
20	Adel Fellous	Prop	28	Catalans Dragons Academy	29	2	0	0	8
21	Julien Touxagas	Second row	22	Catalans Dragons Academy	8	0	0	0	0
22	Jamal Fakir	Prop	24	Villeneuve Leopards	30	6	0	0	24
23	Sébastien Martins	Prop	21	Pia Donkeys	1	0	0	0	0
24	Rémi Casty	Prop	21	Catalans Dragons Academy	9	2	0	0	8
25	Julien Rinaldi	Hooker	27	Wakefield Trinity Wildcats	25	2	1	0	10
27	Lionel Teixido	Hooker	27	Catalans Dragons Academy	9	3	0	0	12
28	Michael Dobson	Scrum half	20	Canberra Raiders (Loan)	12	5	41	1	103
29	Younes Khattabi	Wing	22	Catalans Dragons Academy	3	0	0	0	0
30	Mathieu Griffi	Prop	23	Catalans Dragons Academy	7	0	0	0	0
31	Cyrille Gossard	Second row	24	Catalans Dragons Academy	1	0	0	0	0

== Transfers ==
=== In ===
	Name	Position	Signed from	Date
(New Zealand)	Stacey Jones	Scrum half	New Zealand Warriors	November 2005
(Australia)	John Wilson	Centre	Wests Tigers	November 2005
(Australia)	Mark Hughes	Centre	Newcastle Knights	November 2005
(France)	Jérôme Guisset	Prop	Wigan Warriors	November 2005
(Australia)	Ian Hindmarsh	Second row	Canberra Raiders	November 2005
(New Zealand)	Alex Chan	Prop	Melbourne Storm	November 2005
(Australia)	Michael Dobson	Scrum half	Canberra Raiders (Loan)	March 2006

=== Out ===
	Name	Position	Club Signed	Date
(Australia)	Matt Bickerstaff	Second row	St George Illawarra Dragons	November 2005
(England)	Steve Hall	Wing	Retirement	November 2005
(France)	Romain Gagliazzo	Prop	AS Carcassonne	November 2005
(France)	Sébastien Martins	Second row	Hull Kingston Rovers (Loan)	May 2006
