= 2005 Rugby League Tri-Nations =

2005 rugby championship

2005 Tri-Nations
- Number of teams: 3
- Host country: United Kingdom
- Winner: New Zealand (1st title)
- Matches played: 7
- Attendance: 155,143 (22,163 per match)
- Tries scored: 56 (8 per match)
- Top scorer: (New Zealand) Stacey Jones (42)
- Top try scorers: (New Zealand) Clinton Toopi (5) (New Zealand) Jake Webster (5) (Australia) Matt Cooper (5)

The 2005 Rugby League Tri-Nations was played in Great Britain and Australasia. The final was played between Australia and New Zealand at Elland Road on Saturday 26 November. New Zealand won the match 24-0 and were crowned 2005 Tri-Nations champions, breaking Australia's 27-year undefeated international tournament record.

The tournament was officially known as the 2005 Gillette Tri-Nations due to sponsorship from Gillette.

== Participating teams ==
Each team was to play the other three twice during the round robin tournament. The top two finishing teams would then contest the final.

Team	Nickname	Coach	Captain	RLIF Rank
Australia	The Kangaroos	Wayne Bennett	Darren Lockyer	1
(United Kingdom) Great Britain	The Lions	Brian Noble	Jamie Peacock	2
New Zealand	The Kiwis	Brian McClennan	Ruben Wiki	3

== Officials ==
One referee from each participating nation was appointed to control matches in the Tri-Nations:

- (Australia) Tim Mander (2 matches)
- (England) Steve Ganson (4 matches)
- (New Zealand) Glen Black (1 match)

== Venues ==
The games were played at the following venues in Australia, New Zealand and England.

Sydney	Auckland	London
Telstra Stadium	Ericsson Stadium	Loftus Road
Capacity: 83,500	Capacity: 30,000	Capacity: 18,439
Wigan	Huddersfield	Hull
JJB Stadium	Galpharm Stadium	KC Stadium
Capacity: 25,138	Capacity: 24,500	Capacity: 25,138

=== Final ===
The Tri-Nations Final was played in Leeds.

Leeds
Elland Road
Capacity: 37,890
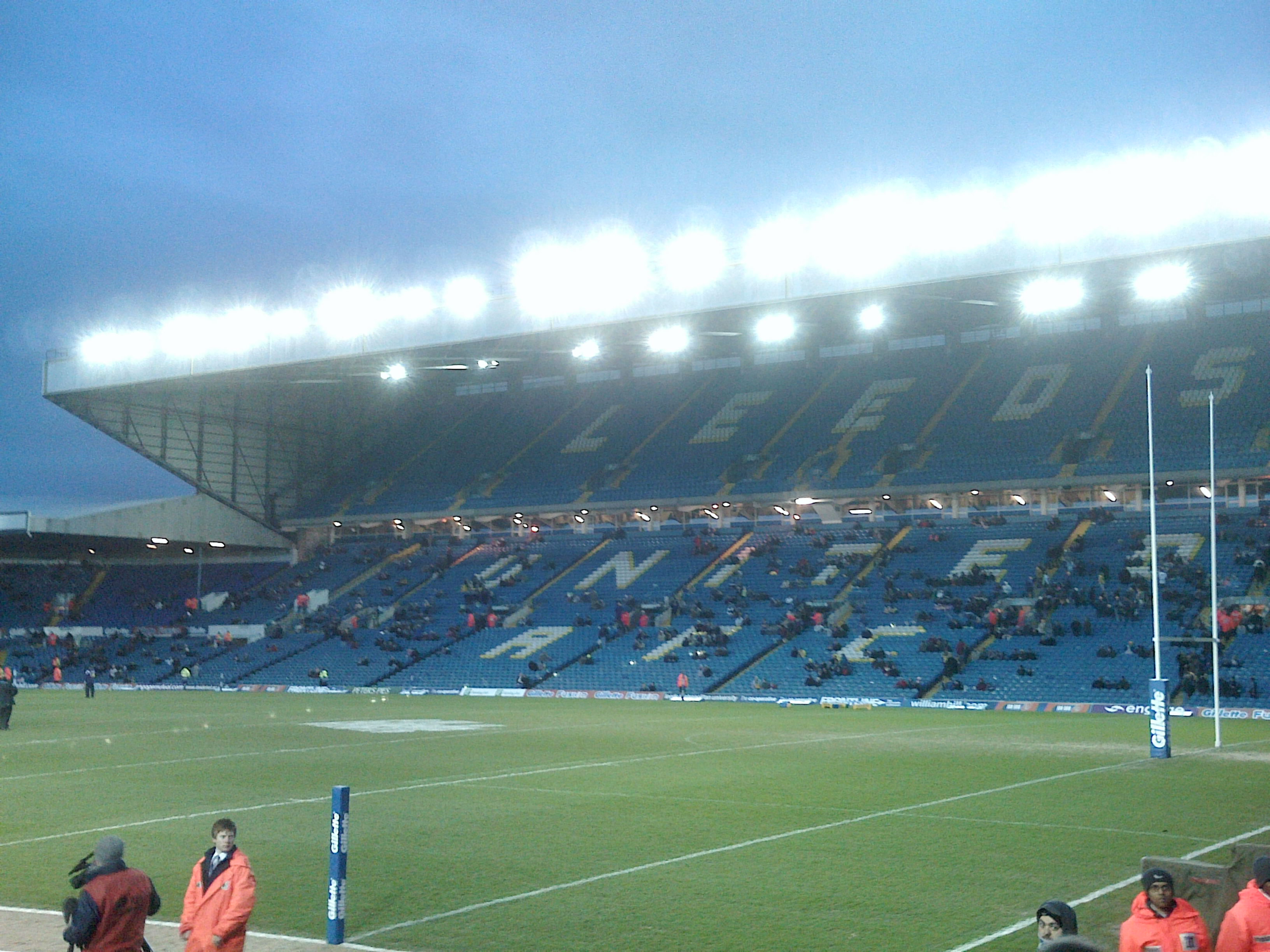

== Results ==
=== Tournament matches ===
2005-10-15

Australia	28–38	New Zealand
Tries: Brent Tate (2); Mark Gasnier (2); Andrew Johns; Matt King; Goals: Craig Fitzgibbon (1/4); Andrew Johns (1/2)	Report	Tries: Clinton Toopi (3); Brent Webb; Nathan Cayless; Nigel Vagana; Goals: Stacey Jones (7/7)

Telstra Stadium, Sydney
Attendance: 28,255
Referee: Steve Ganson (England)

AUSTRALIA
1. Anthony Minichiello · 2. Matt King · 3. Mark Gasnier · 4. Brent Tate · 5. Timana Tahu · 6. Darren Lockyer (c) · 7. Andrew Johns · 8. Petero Civoniceva · 9. Danny Buderus · 10. Steve Price · 11. Luke O'Donnell · 12. Craig Fitzgibbon · 13. Ben Kennedy
Interchange: 14. Craig Gower · 15. Jason Ryles · 16. Andrew Ryan · 17. Trent Waterhouse
Coach: Wayne Bennett

NEW ZEALAND
1. Brent Webb · 2. Jake Webster · 3. Paul Whatuira · 4. Clinton Toopi · 5. Manu Vatuvei · 6. Nigel Vagana · 7. Stacey Jones · 8. Paul Rauhihi · 9. Lance Hohaia · 10. Ruben Wiki (c) · 11. David Kidwell · 12. Frank Pritchard · 13. Louis Anderson
Interchange: 14. David Faiumu · 15. Roy Asotasi · 16. Nathan Cayless · 17. David Solomona
Coach: Brian McClennan

2005-10-21

New Zealand	26–28	Australia
Tries: Jake Webster (2); Nigel Vagana; Motu Tony; David Faiumu; Goals: Stacey Jones (3/6)	Report	Tries: Darren Lockyer (2); Matt Cooper (2); Mark Gasnier; Anthony Minichiello; Goals: Craig Fitzgibbon (2/5); Johns (0/1)

Ericsson Stadium, Auckland
Attendance: 15,400
Referee: Steve Ganson (England)

NEW ZEALAND
1. Brent Webb · 2. Jake Webster · 3. Paul Whatuira · 4. Shontayne Hape · 5. Manu Vatuvei · 6. Nigel Vagana · 7. Stacey Jones · 8. Paul Rauhihi · 9. Motu Tony · 10. Ruben Wiki (c) · 11. David Kidwell · 12. David Solomona · 13. Louis Anderson
Interchange: 14. David Faiumu · 15. Roy Asotasi · 16. Iafeta Palea'aesina · 17. Tony Puletua
Coach: Brian McClennan

AUSTRALIA
1. Anthony Minichiello · 2. Matt King · 3. Mark Gasnier · 4. Matt Cooper · 5. Brent Tate · 6. Darren Lockyer (c) · 7. Andrew Johns · 8. Petero Civoniceva · 9. Danny Buderus · 10. Steve Price · 11. Luke O'Donnell · 12. Craig Fitzgibbon · 13. Ben Kennedy
Interchange: 14. Trent Barrett · 15. Jason Ryles · 16. Mark O'Meley · 17. Trent Waterhouse
Coach: Wayne Bennett

2005-10-29

Great Britain	26–42	New Zealand
Tries: Paul Johnson (3); Keith Senior; Goals: Paul Deacon (1/1); Kevin Sinfield (4/4)	Report	Tries: Brent Webb (2); Clinton Toopi (2); Manu Vatuvei; Jake Webster; Paul Rauhihi; Goals: Stacey Jones (7/7)

Loftus Road, London
Attendance: 15,568
Referee: Glen Black (New Zealand)

GREAT BRITAIN
1. Paul Wellens · 2. Brian Carney · 3. Martin Gleeson · 4. Keith Senior · 5. Leon Pryce · 6. Kevin Sinfield · 7. Paul Deacon · 8. Stuart Fielden · 9. Keiron Cunningham · 10. Jamie Peacock (c) · 11. Lee Gilmour · 12. Paul Johnson · 13. Gareth Ellis
Interchange: 14. Rob Burrow · 15. Adrian Morley · 16. Chev Walker · 17. Nick Fozzard
Coach: Brian Noble

NEW ZEALAND
1. Brent Webb · 2. Jake Webster · 3. Paul Whatuira · 4. Clinton Toopi · 5. Manu Vatuvei · 6. Nigel Vagana · 7. Stacey Jones · 8. Paul Rauhihi · 9. Motu Tony · 10. Ruben Wiki (c) · 11. David Kidwell · 12. David Solomona · 13. Awen Guttenbeil
Interchange: 14. Louis Anderson · 15. Roy Asotasi · 16. Frank Pritchard · 17. Ali Lauiti'iti
Coach: Brian McClennan

2005-11-05

Great Britain	6–20	Australia
Tries: Adrian Morley; Goals: Kevin Sinfield (1/1)	Report	Tries: Matt Cooper (2); Anthony Minichiello; Goals: Craig Fitzgibbon (4/5)

JJB Stadium, Wigan
Attendance: 25,004
Referee: Tim Mander (Australia)

GREAT BRITAIN
1. Paul Wellens · 2. Brian Carney · 3. Martin Gleeson · 4. Keith Senior · 5. Leon Pryce · 6. Iestyn Harris · 7. Paul Deacon · 8. Stuart Fielden · 9. Keiron Cunningham · 10. Adrian Morley · 11. Jamie Peacock (c) · 12. Paul Johnson · 13. Kevin Sinfield
Interchange: 14. Lee Gilmour · 15. Chev Walker · 16. Jamie Thackray · 17. Mickey Higham
Coach: Brian Noble

AUSTRALIA
1. Anthony Minichiello · 2. Matt King · 3. Mark Gasnier · 4. Matt Cooper · 5. Brent Tate · 6. Darren Lockyer (c) · 7. Scott Prince · 8. Petero Civoniceva · 9. Danny Buderus · 10. Steve Price · 11. Luke O'Donnell · 12. Craig Fitzgibbon · 13. Ben Kennedy
Interchange: 14. Trent Barrett · 15. Jason Ryles · 16. Mark O'Meley · 17. Willie Mason
Coach: Wayne Bennett

2005-11-12

Great Britain	38–12	New Zealand
Tries: Brian Carney (2); Stuart Fielden; Paul Deacon; Chev Walker; Keith Senior; Goals: Paul Deacon (2/2); Iestyn Harris (5/5)	Report	Tries: Jake Webster (2); Ali Lauiti'iti; Goals: Stacey Jones (0/3)

Galpharm Stadium, Huddersfield
Attendance: 19,232
Referee: Tim Mander (Australia)

GREAT BRITAIN
1. Paul Wellens · 2. Brian Carney · 3. Martin Gleeson · 4. Keith Senior · 5. Leon Pryce · 6. Iestyn Harris · 7. Paul Deacon · 8. Stuart Fielden · 9. Keiron Cunningham · 10. Adrian Morley · 11. Jamie Peacock (c) · 12. Paul Johnson · 13. Gareth Ellis
Interchange: 14. Mickey Higham · 15. Chev Walker · 16. Jamie Thackray · 17. Richard Horne
Coach: Brian Noble

NEW ZEALAND
1. Brent Webb · 2. Jake Webster · 3. Shontayne Hape · 4. Clinton Toopi · 5. Manu Vatuvei · 6. Nigel Vagana · 7. Stacey Jones · 8. Paul Rauhihi · 9. Motu Tony · 10. Ruben Wiki (c) · 11. David Kidwell · 12. David Solomona · 13. Awen Guttenbeil
Interchange: 14. David Faiumu · 15. Roy Asotasi · 16. Louis Anderson · 17. Ali Lauiti'iti
Coach: Brian McClennan

- Australia were without their captain Darren Lockyer for this match and the remainder of the tournament after he injured his foot at training.

2005-11-19

Great Britain	14–26	Australia
Tries: Brian Carney; Richard Horne; Goals: Iestyn Harris (3/4)	Report	Tries: Matt Cooper; Mark O'Meley; Brent Tate; Mark Gasnier; Goals: Craig Fitzgibbon (5/5); Craig Gower (0/1)

KC Stadium, Hull
Attendance: 25,150
Referee: Steve Ganson (England)

GREAT BRITAIN
1. Leon Pryce · 2. Brian Carney · 3. Martin Gleeson · 4. Keith Senior · 5. Gareth Raynor · 6. Iestyn Harris · 7. Richard Horne · 8. Stuart Fielden · 9. Keiron Cunningham · 10. Adrian Morley · 11. Jamie Peacock (c) · 12. Paul Johnson · 13. Gareth Ellis
Interchange: 14. Mickey Higham · 15. Chev Walker · 16. Jamie Thackray · 17. Kevin Sinfield
Coach: Brian Noble

AUSTRALIA
1. Anthony Minichiello · 2. Matt King · 3. Mark Gasnier · 4. Matt Cooper · 5. Brent Tate · 6. Trent Barrett · 7. Craig Gower · 8. Petero Civoniceva · 9. Danny Buderus (c) · 10. Jason Ryles · 11. Luke O'Donnell · 12. Craig Fitzgibbon · 13. Ben Kennedy
Interchange: 14. Craig Wing · 15. Willie Mason · 16. Mark O'Meley · 17. Trent Waterhouse
Coach: Wayne Bennett

=== Tournament standings ===
Team	Played	Won	Drew	Lost	For	Against	Difference	Points
Australia	4	3	0	1	102	84	+18	6
New Zealand	4	2	0	2	118	120	−2	4
Great Britain	4	1	0	3	84	100	−16	2

=== Final ===
Saturday, 26 November

New Zealand
Tries:
Paul Whatuira
Manu Vatuvei (2)
Brent Webb

Goals: Stacey Jones (4/7)

24–0

Australia

Elland Road, Leeds
Attendance: 26,534
Referee: Steve Ganson (England)
Player of the Match: Ruben Wiki (New Zealand)

Australia	Position	New Zealand
Anthony Minichiello	FB	Brent Webb
Matt King	WG	Jake Webster
Mark Gasnier	CE	Paul Whatuira
Matt Cooper	CE	Clinton Toopi
Brent Tate	WG	Manu Vatuvei
Trent Barrett	FE	Nigel Vagana
Craig Gower	HB	Stacey Jones
Petero Civoniceva	PR	Paul Rauhihi
Danny Buderus (c)	HK	Motu Tony
Jason Ryles	PR	Ruben Wiki (c)
Luke O'Donnell	SR	David Kidwell
Craig Fitzgibbon	SR	Louis Anderson
Ben Kennedy	LK	Shontayne Hape
Craig Wing	Int	David Faiumu
Willie Mason	Int	Roy Asotasi
Mark O'Meley	Int	David Solomona
Steve Price	Int	Ali Lauiti'iti
Wayne Bennett	Coach	Brian McClennan

The historic win by the Kiwis over an Australian 17 containing only 3 Queensland players and one player from the previous month's 2005 NRL grand final put an end to the Kangaroos' dominance in international rugby league. It was the first time Australia, hot favourites for the match, had failed to win a series or tournament since France defeated them in both Tests of the 1978 Kangaroo tour.

The win by New Zealand was the first time the Kiwis had beaten Australia in a test series or tournament (not including one-off test wins in 1971, 1987 and 1998) since 1952. Australian coach Wayne Bennett resigned from the national coaching post just over a week after the final.

== Player statistics ==
Top point scorers
	Player	Team	T	G	FG	Pts
1	Stacey Jones	New Zealand	0	21	0	42
2	Craig Fitzgibbon	Australia	0	12	0	24
3	Clinton Toopi	New Zealand	5	0	0	20
3	Jake Webster	New Zealand	5	0	0	20
3	Matt Cooper	Australia	5	0	0	20

Top try scorers
	Player	Team	T
1	Clinton Toopi	New Zealand	5
1	Jake Webster	New Zealand	5
1	Matt Cooper	Australia	5
2	Brent Webb	New Zealand	4
2	Mark Gasnier	Australia	4

=== Non-series tests ===
During the series, Australia and New Zealand played additional Tests against France. This was the first time the two teams had met in a test match since Australia's 74–0 win in Béziers in the last game of the 1994 Kangaroo tour.

Australia: 1 Anthony Minichiello, 2 Eric Grothe, Jr., 3 Mark Gasnier, 4 Matt Cooper, 5 Brent Tate, 6 Scott Prince, 7 Craig Gower (c), 8 Jason Ryles, 9 Craig Wing, 10 Mark O'Meley, 11 Ben Creagh, 12 Willie Mason, 13 Trent Waterhouse
Interchange: 14 Steve Price, 15 Petero Civoniceva, 16 Andrew Ryan, 17 Matt King
France: 1 Renaud Guigue, 2 Frédéric Zitter, 3 Christophe Moly, 4 Jérôme Hermet, 5 Olivier Charles, 6 Laurent Frayssinous, 7 Julien Rinaldi, 8 David Ferriol, 9 David Berthezène, 10 Jérôme Guisset, 11 Aurélien Cologni, 12 Jamal Fakir, 13 Grégory Mounis
Interchange: 14 Maxime Grésèque, 15 Adel Fellous, 16 Jean Christophe Borlin, 17. Sébastien Raguin

11 November 2005

France	12–44	Australia

Stade Aimé Giral, Perpignan
Attendance: 7,913
Referee: Ashley Klein (Australia)

For this match, Craig Gower was given the honour of captaining Australia for the first time.

Australia 44 (A Minichiello 2, T Waterhouse 2, M Cooper, S Prince, C Gower, W Mason tries; S Prince 6 goals) defeated France 12 (L Frayssinous, M Gresqueu tries; L Frayssinous 2 goals)

18 November 2005

France	22–38	New Zealand

Stadium Municipal, Toulouse
Attendance: 12,500
Referee: Karl Kirkpatrick (England)

=== Other game ===
New Zealand played a midweek match against England "A" which did not count as a test match. Halftime was 12-all.

7 November 2005

England A	22–30	New Zealand

Halliwell Jones Stadium, Warrington

== See also ==
- 2005 NRL season
- Super League X
