= List of Catalans Dragons records and statistics =

This is a list of all the records and statistics of rugby league side the Catalans Dragons. It concentrates on the records of the team and the performances of the players who have played for this team. Since their entry to the English leagues the Dragons played their first game against Wigan Warriors in Super League XI on 11 February 2006, Catalans won the match 38–30. As of 25 September 2012 the Dragons have played 220 games.

== Team records ==
=== Team wins, losses, ties and draws ===
==== Matches played ====
Team	1st Game	Matches	Won	Lost	Drawn	Points For	Points Against	% Won
Catalans Dragons	11 February 2006	228	109	114	5	5463	5756	47.80
Source:. Last updated: 23 March 2013.

==== Results summary ====
Opposition	Span	Matches	Won	Lost	Drawn	Points For	Points Against	% Won
Batley Bulldogs	2010–	1	1	0	0	74	12	100.00
Bradford Bulls	2006–2013	19	8	10	1	431	558	00.00
Castleford Tigers	2006–2013	15	8	6	1	445	349	00.00
Crusaders RL	2009–2011	7	5	2	0	190	132	00.00
Featherstone Rovers	2007–2008	2	2	0	0	92	24	100.00
Huddersfield Giants	2006–2012	17	7	10	0	329	434	00.00
Hull F.C.	2006–2012	16	5	9	2	310	363	00.00
Hull Kingston Rovers	2007–2013	15	9	6	0	345	304	00.00
Leeds Rhinos	2006–2012	17	4	13	0	322	629	00.00
Leigh Centurions	2011–	1	1	0	0	22	16	100.00
London Broncos	2006–2012	20	12	8	0	514	449	00.00
Salford Red Devils	2006–2013	15	9	6	0	402	228	00.00
Sheffield Eagles	2012–	1	1	0	0	68	6	100.00
St Helens R.F.C.	2006–2012	18	6	12	0	340	551	00.00
Thornhill Trojans	2006	1	1	0	0	66	0	100.00
Wakefield Trinity	2006–2013	18	9	9	0	448	459	00.00
Warrington Wolves	2006–2013	19	9	10	0	450	488	00.00
Whitehaven R.L.F.C.	2007	1	1	0	0	24	14	100.00
Widnes Vikings	2006–2013	4	4	0	0	198	70	100.00
Wigan Warriors	2006–2013	21	7	13	1	403	664	00.00
Source:. Last updated: 23 March 2013.

==== Highest scores ====
Rank	Score	Opposition	Competition	Venue	Date
1	76-6	vs. Widnes Vikings	2012 Super League	Stade Gilbert Brutus, Perpignan, France	31 March 2012
2	74-12	vs. Batley Bulldogs	2010 Challenge Cup	(England) Mount Pleasant, Batley, West Yorkshire	30 May 2010
3	70-12	vs. Featherstone Rovers	2007 Challenge Cup	Stade Gilbert Brutus, Perpignan, France	29 March 2007
4	68-6	vs. Sheffield Eagles	2012 Challenge Cup	Stade Gilbert Brutus, Perpignan, France	28 April 2012
5	66-0	vs. Thornhill Trojans	2006 Challenge Cup	Stade Jean-Laffon, Perpignan, France	1 April 2006
6	66-6	vs. Salford City Reds	2007 Super League	Stade Gilbert Brutus, Perpignan, France	19 May 2007
7	56-6	vs. Hull Kingston Rovers	2011 Super League	Stade Gilbert Brutus, Perpignan, France	17 September 2011
8	54-20	vs. Castleford Tigers	2011 Super League	Stade Gilbert Brutus, Perpignan, France	25 June 2011
9	52-14	vs. Warrington Wolves	2008 Super League	Stade Gilbert Brutus, Perpignan, France	21 June 2008
10	51-14	vs. Castleford Tigers	2006 Super League	Stade Albert Domec, Carcassonne, France	8 April 2006
Source:. Last updated: 5 May 2012.

==== Lowest scores ====
Rank	Score	Opposition	Competition	Venue	Date
1	0-10	vs. Salford City Reds	2007 Super League	(England) The Willows, Salford, Greater Manchester	4 March 2007
2	0-16	vs. Salford City Reds	2006 Super League	(England) The Willows, Salford, Greater Manchester	17 February 2006
3	0-30	vs. Wigan Warriors	2007 Super League	(England) JJB Stadium, Wigan, Greater Manchester	15 June 2007
4	0-38	vs. Wigan Warriors	2013 Super League	(England) DW Stadium, Wigan, Greater Manchester	8 March 2013
5	0-44	vs. Wigan Warriors	2011 Super League	(England) DW Stadium, Wigan, Greater Manchester	25 September 2011
6	0-58	vs. Wigan Warriors	2010 Super League	(England) DW Stadium, Wigan, Greater Manchester	26 February 2010
7	4-11	vs. Harlequins RL	2011 Super League	Millennium Stadium, Cardiff, Wales	12 February 2011
8	4-16	vs. Harlequins RL	2010 Super League	(England) Twickenham Stoop, Twickenham, Greater London	14 February 2010
9	4-40	vs. Wigan Warriors	2006 Super League	(England) JJB Stadium, Wigan, Greater Manchester	4 August 2006
10	6-14	vs. Crusaders RL	2010 Super League	Racecourse Ground, Wrexham, Wales	19 March 2010
Source:. Last updated: 8 March 2013.

==== Biggest wins ====
Rank	Margin	Opposition	Competition	Venue	Date
1	70 points	vs. Widnes Vikings	2012 Super League	Stade Gilbert Brutus, Perpignan, France	31 March 2012
2	66 points	vs. Thornhill Trojans	2006 Challenge Cup	Stade Jean-Laffon, Perpignan, France	1 April 2006
3	62 points	vs. Batley Bulldogs	2010 Challenge Cup	(England) Mount Pleasant, Batley, West Yorkshire	30 May 2010
4	62 points	vs. Sheffield Eagles	2012 Challenge Cup	Stade Gilbert Brutus, Perpignan, France	28 April 2012
5	60 points	vs. Salford City Reds	2007 Super League	Stade Gilbert Brutus, Perpignan, France	19 May 2007
6	58 points	vs. Featherstone Rovers	2007 Challenge Cup	Stade Gilbert Brutus, Perpignan, France	29 March 2007
7	50 points	vs. Hull Kingston Rovers	2011 Super League	Stade Gilbert Brutus, Perpignan, France	17 September 2011
8	48 points	vs. Huddersfield Giants	2008 Super League	Stade Gilbert Brutus, Perpignan, France	24 May 2008
9	38 points	vs. Warrington Wolves	2008 Super League	Stade Gilbert Brutus, Perpignan, France	21 June 2008
10	38 points	vs. Warrington Wolves	2008 Super League	Stade Gilbert Brutus, Perpignan, France	13 September 2008
Source:. Last updated: 28 April 2012.

==== Biggest losses ====
Rank	Margin	Opposition	Competition	Venue	Date
1	58 points	vs. Wigan Warriors	2010 Super League	(England) DW Stadium, Wigan, Greater Manchester	26 February 2010
2	48 points	vs. Leeds Rhinos	2006 Super League	Stade Aimé Giral, Perpignan, France	11 March 2006
3	48 points	vs. Bradford Bulls	2006 Super League	(England) Odsal Stadium, Bradford, West Yorkshire	28 April 2006
4	48 points	vs. Leeds Rhinos	2006 Super League	(England) Headingley Stadium, Leeds, West Yorkshire	15 September 2006
5	46 points	vs. St Helens R.F.C.	2006 Challenge Cup	(England) Knowsley Road, St Helens, Merseyside	3 June 2006
6	46 points	vs. Leeds Rhinos	2007 Super League	(England) Headingley Stadium, Leeds, West Yorkshire	27 April 2007
7	46 points	vs. Leeds Rhinos	2010 Super League	(England) Headingley Stadium, Leeds, West Yorkshire	20 August 2010
8	44 points	vs. Wigan Warriors	2011 Super League	(England) DW Stadium, Wigan, Greater Manchester	25 September 2011
9	43 points	vs. St Helens R.F.C.	2006 Challenge Cup	(England) Knowsley Road, St Helens, Merseyside	13 April 2007
Source:. Last updated: 25 September 2011.

== Individual records ==
=== Most matches as captain ===
Name	Years As Captain	Total	Won	Lost	Drawn
(New Zealand) Stacey Jones	2006–2007	44	17	27	0
(France) Jérôme Guisset	2006–2010	34	13	19	2
(Australia) Casey McGuire	2008–2010	20	11	9	0
(Australia) Jason Croker	2008–2009	8	5	2	1
(Australia) Greg Bird	2009	21	12	9	0
(France) Olivier Elima	2010	8	1	7	0
(France) Thomas Bosc	2010	22	8	14	0
(France) Grégory Mounis	2011–present	59	33	24	2
(France) Rémi Casty	2012–present	12	9	3	0
Source: Last updated: 23 March 2013.

=== Most career appearances ===
Rank	Apps	Player	Span
1	192	(France) Grégory Mounis	2006–present
2	168	(France) Rémi Casty	2006–present
3	150	(Morocco) Jamal Fakir	2006–present
4	150	(France) Thomas Bosc	2006–present
5	146	(Australia) Clint Greenshields	2007–2012
6	144	(France) David Ferriol	2007–2012
7	141	(France) Jérôme Guisset	2006–2010
8	137	(France) Sébastien Raguin	2007–2012
9	99	(Australia) Casey McGuire	2007–2010
10	93	(France) Cyrille Gossard	2006–2012
Source:. Last updated: 23 March 2013.

=== Most career points ===
Rank	Points	Player	Span
1	941	(France) Thomas Bosc	2006–present
2	558	(Australia) Scott Dureau	2011–present
3	340	(Australia) Clint Greenshields	2007–2012
4	216	(Australia) Justin Murphy	2006–2008
5	168	(Australia) Damien Blanch	2011–present
6	164	(France) Vincent Duport	2007–2009; 2011–present
7	152	(France) Dimitri Pelo	2007–2010
8	150	(New Zealand) Stacey Jones	2006–2007
9	144	(France) Olivier Elima	2008–2010; 2013–present
10	140	(France) Grégory Mounis	2006–present
Source:. Last updated: 23 March 2013.

=== Most career tries ===
Rank	Tries	Player	Span
1	85	(Australia) Clint Greenshields	2007–2012
2	54	(Australia) Justin Murphy	2006–2008
3	46	(France) Thomas Bosc	2006–present
4	42	(Australia) Damien Blanch	2011–present
5	41	(France) Vincent Duport	2007–2009; 2011–present
6	38	(France) Dimitri Pelo	2007–2010
7	36	(France) Olivier Elima	2008–2010; 2013–present
8	29	(Australia) Casey McGuire	2007–2010
9	29	(France) Sébastien Raguin	2007–2012
10	27	(Australia) Steve Menzies	2011–present
11	26	(France) Grégory Mounis	2006–present
12	24	(France) Jean-Philippe Baile	2008–present
13	24	(Fiji) Daryl Millard	2011–present
14	23	(Australia) Scott Dureau	2011–present
15	22	(France) Rémi Casty	2006–present
16	20	(France) Frédéric Vaccari	2009–present
Source:. Last updated: 23 March 2013.

=== Most career goals ===
Rank	Goals	Player	Span
1	375	(France) Thomas Bosc	2006–present
2	229	(Australia) Scott Dureau	2011–present
3	49	(New Zealand) Stacey Jones	2006–2007
4	41	(Australia) Michael Dobson	2006
5	37	(France) Laurent Frayssinous	2006
6	18	(France) Grégory Mounis	2006–present
7	14	(Australia) Aaron Gorrell	2007–2008
8	9	(France) Rémy Marginet	2011
9	3	(Australia) Greg Bird	2009
10	3	(France) William Barthau	2010–present
11	3	(France) Tony Gigot	2010–2011
Source:. Last updated: 23 March 2013.

=== Most career drop goals ===
Rank	DG's	Player	Span
1	8	(Australia) Scott Dureau	2011–present
2	7	(France) Thomas Bosc	2006–present
3	4	(New Zealand) Stacey Jones	2006–2007
4	1	(Australia) Michael Dobson	2006
5	1	(Australia) Jason Croker	2007–2009
6	1	(France) Jérôme Guisset	2006–2010
7	1	(Australia) Adam Mogg	2007–2010
8	1	(Australia) Brent Sherwin	2010
Source:. Last updated: 2 March 2013.

=== Most points in a season ===
Rank	Points	Player	Season
1	319 points	(Australia) Scott Dureau	2012
2	275 points	(France) Thomas Bosc	2008
3	239 points	(Australia) Scott Dureau	2011
4	196 points	(France) Thomas Bosc	2009
5	189 points	(France) Thomas Bosc	2007
6	137 points	(France) Thomas Bosc	2010
7	112 points	(Australia) Justin Murphy	2006
8	103 points	(Australia) Michael Dobson	2006
Source:. Last updated: 25 September 2012.

=== Most tries in a season ===
Rank	Tries	Player	Season
1	28	(Australia) Justin Murphy	2006
2	21	(Australia) Damien Blanch	2011
3	19	(France) Olivier Elima	2009
4	19	(France) Vincent Duport	2012
5	19	(Australia) Clint Greenshields	2012
6	18	(Australia) Clint Greenshields	2008
7	17	(France) Dimitri Pelo	2009
8	16	(Australia) Justin Murphy	2008
9	15	(Australia) Damien Blanch	2012
10	14	(Australia) Steve Menzies	2011
Source:. Last updated: 25 September 2012.

=== Most goals in a season ===
Rank	Goals	Player	Season
1	134 goals	(Australia) Scott Dureau	2012
2	123 goals	(France) Thomas Bosc	2008
3	95 goals	(Australia) Scott Dureau	2011
4	85 goals	(France) Thomas Bosc	2009
5	68 goals	(France) Thomas Bosc	2007
6	62 goals	(France) Thomas Bosc	2010
7	41 goals	(Australia) Michael Dobson	2006
8	37 goals	(France) Laurent Frayssinous	2006
Source:. Last updated: 25 September 2012.

=== Most drop goals in a season ===
Rank	DG's	Player	Season
1	5	(Australia) Scott Dureau	2011
2	4	(New Zealand) Stacey Jones	2007
3	3	(Australia) Scott Dureau	2012
4	2	(France) Thomas Bosc	2009
Source:. Last updated: 25 September 2012.

=== Most points in a match ===
Rank	Points	Player	Opposition	Competition	Venue	Date
1	26 points	(France) Thomas Bosc	vs. Featherstone Rovers	2007 Challenge Cup	Stade Gilbert Brutus, Perpignan, France	29 March 2007
2	26 points	(France) Thomas Bosc	vs. Salford City Reds	2007 Super League	Stade Gilbert Brutus, Perpignan, France	19 May 2007
3	23 points	(Australia) Scott Dureau	vs. Wigan Warriors	2011 Super League	(England) DW Stadium, Wigan, Greater Manchester	8 April 2011
4	22 points	(France) Thomas Bosc	vs. Batley Bulldogs	2010 Challenge Cup	(England) Mount Pleasant, Batley, West Yorkshire	30 May 2010
5	22 points	(Australia) Scott Dureau	vs. Widnes Vikings	2012 Super League	Stade Gilbert Brutus, Perpignan, France	31 March 2012
6	20 points	(France) Thomas Bosc	vs. Warrington Wolves	2008 Super League	Stade Gilbert Brutus, Perpignan, France	21 June 2008
7	20 points	(France) Thomas Bosc	vs. Bradford Bulls	2009 Challenge Cup	Stade Gilbert Brutus, Perpignan, France	5 April 2009
8	20 points	(Australia) Scott Dureau	vs. Sheffield Eagles	2012 Challenge Cup	Stade Gilbert Brutus, Perpignan, France	28 April 2012
9	20 points	(Australia) Scott Dureau	vs. Hull F.C.	2012 Super League	Stade Gilbert Brutus, Perpignan, France	14 July 2012
Source:. Last updated: 14 July 2012.

=== Most tries in a match ===
Rank	Tries	Player	Opposition	Competition	Venue	Date
1	4 tries	(Australia) Justin Murphy	vs. Warrington Wolves	2008 Super League	Stade Gilbert Brutus, Perpignan, France	13 September 2008
2	4 tries	(France) Damien Cardace	vs. Widnes Vikings	2012 Super League	Stade Gilbert Brutus, Perpignan, France	31 March 2012
3	3 tries	(France) Bruno Verges	vs. Castleford Tigers	2006 Super League	Stade Albert Domec, Carcassonne, France	8 April 2006
4	3 tries	(Australia) John Wilson	vs. Castleford Tigers	2006 Super League	(England) Wheldon Road, Castleford, West Yorkshire	14 May 2006
5	3 tries	(Australia) Justin Murphy	vs. St Helens R.F.C.	2006 Super League	(England) Knowsley Road, St Helens, Merseyside	7 July 2006
6	3 tries	(Australia) Justin Murphy	vs. Salford City Reds	2007 Super League	Stade Gilbert Brutus, Perpignan, France	19 May 2007
7	3 tries	(Australia) Clint Greenshields	vs. Wigan Warriors	2008 Super League	Stade Gilbert Brutus, Perpignan, France	14 June 2008
8	3 tries	(France) Jean-Philippe Baile	vs. Hull Kingston Rovers	2009 Super League	Stade Gilbert Brutus, Perpignan, France	4 July 2009
9	3 tries	(France) Olivier Elima	vs. Hull F.C.	2009 Super League	Stade de la Méditerranée, Béziers, France	15 August 2009
10	3 tries	(France) Vincent Duport	vs. Leeds Rhinos	2009 Super League	(England) Headingley Stadium, Leeds, West Yorkshire	2 October 2009
11	3 tries	(Samoa) Setaimata Sa	vs. Crusaders RL	2010 Challenge Cup	Racecourse Ground, Wrexham, Wales	9 May 2010
12	3 tries	(Australia) Clint Greenshields	vs. Crusaders RL	2011 Super League	Racecourse Ground, Wrexham, Wales	18 March 2011
13	3 tries	(Australia) Damien Blanch	vs. Hull Kingston Rovers	2011 Super League	Stade Gilbert Brutus, Perpignan, France	17 September 2011
14	3 tries	(Australia) Clint Greenshields	vs. Widnes Vikings	2012 Super League	Stade Gilbert Brutus, Perpignan, France	31 March 2012
15	3 tries	(France) Damien Cardace	vs. Sheffield Eagles	2012 Challenge Cup	Stade Gilbert Brutus, Perpignan, France	28 April 2012
Source:. Last updated: 28 April 2012.

=== Most goals in a match ===
Rank	Goals	Player	Opposition	Competition	Venue	Date
1	11 goals	(France) Thomas Bosc	vs. Featherstone Rovers	2007 Challenge Cup	Stade Gilbert Brutus, Perpignan, France	29 March 2007
2	11 goals	(France) Thomas Bosc	vs. Batley Bulldogs	2010 Challenge Cup	(England) Mount Pleasant, Batley, West Yorkshire	30 May 2010
3	11 goals	(Australia) Scott Dureau	vs. Widnes Vikings	2012 Super League	Stade Gilbert Brutus, Perpignan, France	31 March 2012
4	10 goals	(Australia) Scott Dureau	vs. Sheffield Eagles	2012 Challenge Cup	Stade Gilbert Brutus, Perpignan, France	28 April 2012
5	9 goals	(France) Thomas Bosc	vs. Salford City Reds	2007 Super League	Stade Gilbert Brutus, Perpignan, France	19 May 2007
6	8 goals	(France) Thomas Bosc	vs. Huddersfield Giants	2008 Super League	Stade Gilbert Brutus, Perpignan, France	24 May 2008
7	8 goals	(France) Thomas Bosc	vs. Wigan Warriors	2008 Super League	Stade Gilbert Brutus, Perpignan, France	14 June 2008
8	8 goals	(France) Thomas Bosc	vs. Warrington Wolves	2008 Super League	Stade Gilbert Brutus, Perpignan, France	21 June 2008
9	8 goals	(France) Rémy Marginet	vs. Harlequins RL	2011 Super League	Stade Gilbert Brutus, Perpignan, France	30 July 2011
10	8 goals	(Australia) Scott Dureau	vs. Hull Kingston Rovers	2011 Super League	Stade Gilbert Brutus, Perpignan, France	17 September 2011
Source:. Last updated: 28 April 2012.

=== Most drop goals in a match ===
Rank	DG's	Player	Opposition	Competition	Venue	Date
1	1	(Australia) Michael Dobson	vs. Castleford Tigers	2006 Super League	Stade Albert Domec, Carcassonne, France	8 April 2006
2	1	(New Zealand) Stacey Jones	vs. Huddersfield Giants	2007 Super League	Stade Gilbert Brutus, Perpignan, France	17 March 2007
3	1	(Australia) Jason Croker	vs. Bradford Bulls	2007 Super League	(England) Odsal Stadium, Bradford, West Yorkshire	25 March 2007
4	1	(New Zealand) Stacey Jones	vs. Warrington Wolves	2007 Super League	Stade Gilbert Brutus, Perpignan, France	21 April 2007
5	1	(France) Thomas Bosc	vs. Hull F.C.	2007 Challenge Cup	(England) KC Stadium, Kingston upon Hull, West Yorkshire	10 June 2007
6	1	(France) Jérôme Guisset	vs. Hull F.C.	2007 Challenge Cup	(England) KC Stadium, Kingston upon Hull, West Yorkshire	10 June 2007
7	1	(New Zealand) Stacey Jones	vs. Wigan Warriors	2007 Challenge Cup	(England) Halliwell Jones Stadium, Warrington, Cheshire	29 July 2007
8	1	(New Zealand) Stacey Jones	vs. St Helens R.F.C.	2007 Super League	Stade Gilbert Brutus, Perpignan, France	11 August 2007
9	1	(France) Thomas Bosc	vs. Castleford Tigers	2008 Super League	(England) Wheldon Road, Castleford, West Yorkshire	9 February 2008
10	1	(Australia) Adam Mogg	vs. Wigan Warriors	2008 Super League	Stade Gilbert Brutus, Perpignan, France	14 June 2008
11	1	(France) Thomas Bosc	vs. Hull Kingston Rovers	2009 Super League	Stade Gilbert Brutus, Perpignan, France	4 July 2009
12	1	(France) Thomas Bosc	vs. Wakefield Trinity Wildcats	2009 Super League	(England) Belle Vue, Wakefield, West Yorkshire	19 September 2009
13	1	(France) Thomas Bosc	vs. Crusaders RL	2010 Challenge Cup	Racecourse Ground, Wrexham, Wales	9 May 2010
14	1	(Australia) Brent Sherwin	vs. Warrington Wolves	2010 Super League	(England) Stade Aimé Giral, Perpignan, France	24 July 2010
Source:. Last updated: 25 September 2011.

== Attendance records ==
=== Season average attendance ===
Rank	Average	Highest	Opposition	Season
1	9,005	13,858	vs. Wigan Warriors	2012
2	8,965	18,150	vs. Warrington Wolves	2009
3	8,487	9,985	vs. Wigan Warriors	2008
4	8,401	10,688	vs. Leeds Rhinos	2011
5	7,706	9,300	vs. Harlequins RL	2007
6	6,694	8,884	vs. Bradford Bulls	2010
7	6,163	11,000	vs. Wigan Warriors	2006
Source:. Last updated: 25 September 2012.

=== Highest match attendance ===
Rank	Att	Opposition	Competition	Date
1	18,150	vs. Warrington Wolves	2009 Super League	20 June 2009
2	13,858	vs. Wigan Warriors	2012 Super League	9 June 2012
3	11,523	vs. Leeds Rhinos	2012 Super League	21 September 2012
4	11,500	vs. Warrington Wolves	2012 Super League	9 April 2012
5	11,000	vs. Wigan Warriors	2006 Super League	11 February 2006
6	10,688	vs. Leeds Rhinos	2011 Super League	10 July 2011
7	10,684	vs. Huddersfield Giants	2012 Super League	5 May 2012
8	10,387	vs. St Helens R.F.C.	2012 Super League	20 July 2012
9	10,269	vs. Leeds Rhinos	2012 Super League	18 August 2012
10	9,985	vs. Wigan Warriors	2008 Super League	20 September 2008
Source:. Last updated: 21 September 2012.

== Coaching ==
=== Coaching records ===
Name	Years As Coach	Total	Won	Lost	Drawn
(Australia) David Waite	2006	5	1	4	0
(Australia) Michael Potter	2006–2008	89	41	45	3
(Australia) Kevin Walters	2009–2010	63	25	38	0
(Australia) Trent Robinson	2011–2012	63	37	25	1
(France) Laurent Frayssinous	2013–present	8	5	2	1
Source: Last updated: 23 March 2013.
