= Bill Peden =

Australian rugby league footballer

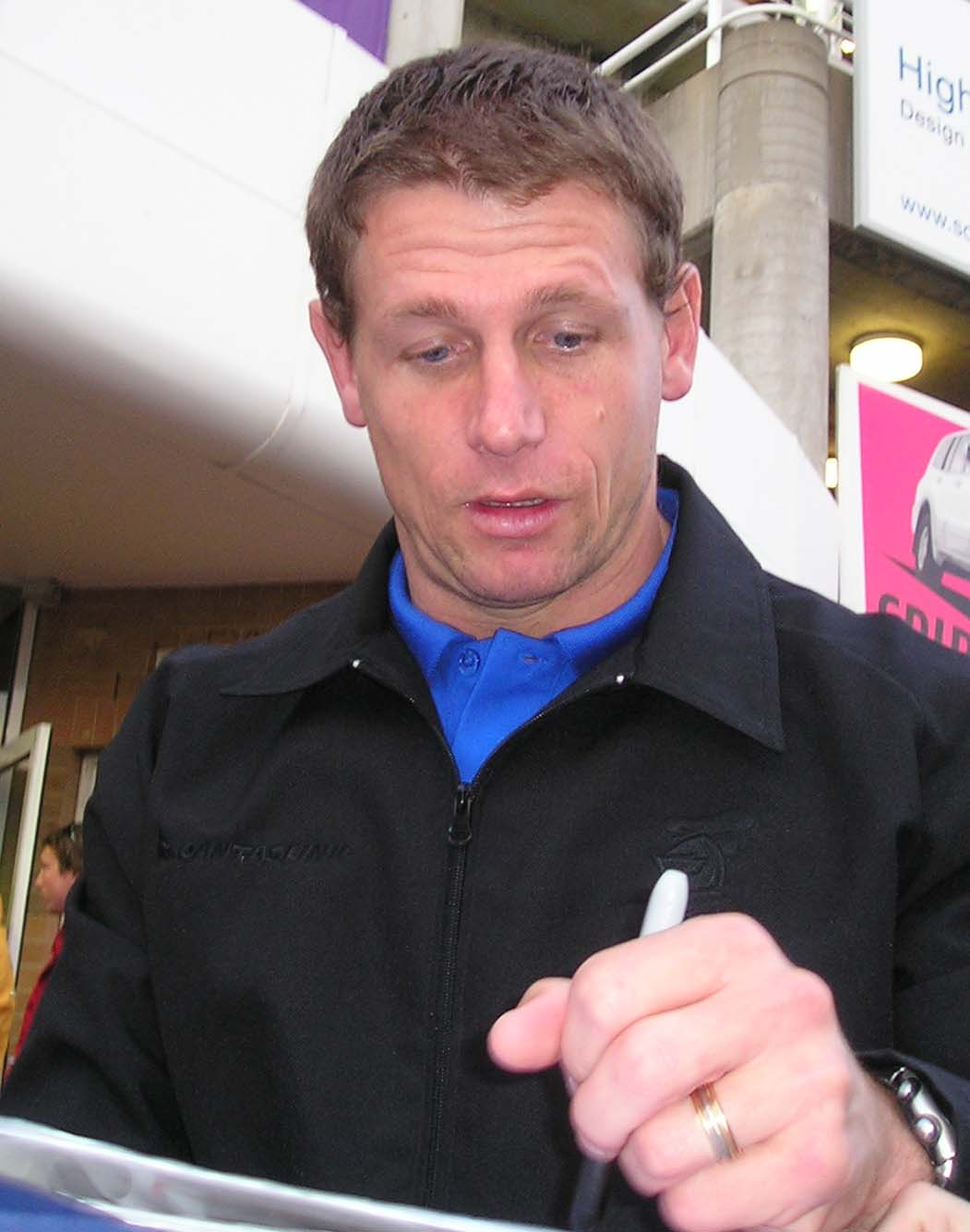

Personal information
- Full name: Bill Peden
- Born: 10 February 1970 (age 55); Cessnock, New South Wales, Australia
- Height: 181 cm (5 ft 11 in)
- Weight: 90 kg (14 st 2 lb)

Playing information
- Position: Hooker, Lock, Prop, Second-row
Club
Years	Team	Pld	T	G	FG	P
1994–02	Newcastle Knights	190	42	35	0	238
2003	London Broncos	25	8	0	0	32
	Total	215	50	35	0	270
- Source: As of 6 February 2019

Billy Peden is an Australian former rugby league footballer who played in the 1990s and 2000s. He played in Australasia's National Rugby League for the Newcastle Knights (winning the 1997 and 2001 premierships with them) and in the Super League for the London Broncos. Peden's usual position was at Lock but he could also operate at Hooker, Second-row, Prop.

== Background ==
Peden was born in Cessnock, New South Wales. Peden is a former car mechanic.

== Playing career ==
Peden played in the 1997 ARL grand final victory over Manly-Warringah which was the club's first premiership. The game is remembered for Darren Albert scoring under the posts in the final 10 seconds of the game after receiving an inside ball from Andrew Johns.

Peden played at Lock for the Knights in the 2001 NRL grand final and scored two tries in his side's win over the Parramatta Eels. Having won the 2001 NRL Premiership, the Knights traveled to England to play the 2002 World Club Challenge against Super League champions, the Bradford Bulls. Peden played at Lock in Newcastle's loss.

In 2011, Peden spoke at the Once-A-Knight Old Boys grand final lunch about the 2001 grand final saying ‘"In 1997 it was special because it was the first one ... and all the emotion involved with that, but 2001 had its own emotions attached to it in terms of being a unified premiership and we were challenged on the fact that 1997 wasn’t. "I was lucky to have played in two great sides. You look at the blokes sitting here today and you have to pinch yourself to think you actually played with those blokes, so I was very blessed".

== Post playing ==
In 2006, Peden signed a three-year deal to join the coaching staff at Harlequins RL. Peden has also had a coaching role with his former club Newcastle Knights. In 2011, the Cessnock club's centenary year, Peden was named on the bench in a Cessnock 'Team of the Century'. Peden later took a job working in underground coal mining around the Lake Macquarie area.
