= 2001 NRL Grand Final =

Australian rugby league championship match

- Cover of Big League match program

Parramatta Eels	Newcastle Knights
24	30
	1	2	Total
PAR	0	24	24
NEW	24	6	30
- Date: 30 September 2001
- Stadium: Stadium Australia
- Location: Sydney
- Clive Churchill Medal: Andrew Johns (NEW)
- Australian National anthem: Christine Anu
- Referee: Bill Harrigan
- Attendance: 90,414

Broadcast partners
- Broadcasters: Nine Network
- Commentators: Ken Sutcliffe (host); Ray Warren; Peter Sterling; Paul Vautin; Phil Gould Andrew Voss (sideline)

The 2001 NRL Grand Final was the conclusive and premiership-deciding game of the 2001 NRL season. It was contested at Stadium Australia in Sydney by the Newcastle Knights (who had finished the regular season in third place), and the Parramatta Eels (who had finished the regular season in first place), after the other six teams that had competed in the top-eight finals series had been eliminated. The attendance of 90,414 was the fourth highest ever seen at a rugby league match in Australia and it was the first nighttime grand final in the competition’s 93-year history. Domestically, live free-to-air television coverage was provided by Nine's Wide World of Sports. The match was also broadcast live in the United States by Fox Sports World. Newcastle Knights won, with their captain Andrew Johns receiving the Clive Churchill Medal for man of the match.

== Background ==
The 2001 NRL season was the 94th season of professional rugby league football in Australia and the fourth run by the National Rugby League. Also called the 2001 Telstra Premiership (due to sponsorship from Telstra), it was contested by 13 Australian-based clubs plus one New Zealand-based club. Parramatta had also finished as minor premiers, breaking several records in the process which, as of 2024, still stand, including most points scored in a regular season, most points scored in a full season and most tries scored in a season.

Newcastle had finished in third place at the end of the regular season with 16 wins, 9 losses, and a singular draw. They defeated the 2000 runner-ups, the Sydney Roosters in the first week of the finals and Cronulla-Sutherland in the preliminary final to progress through to the grand final.

== Teams ==
Team details
Parramatta Eels		Position	Newcastle Knights
Name	Number	Position	Number	Name
Brett Hodgson	1	Fullback	1	Robbie O'Davis
Luke Burt	2	Wing	2	Timana Tahu
Jamie Lyon	3	Centre	3	Matthew Gidley
David Vaealiki	4	Centre	4	Mark Hughes
Jason Moodie	5	Wing	5	Adam MacDougall
Michael Buettner	6	Five eighth	6	Sean Rudder
Jason Taylor	7	Half back	7	Andrew Johns (c)
Nathan Cayless (c)	8	Prop forward	8	Josh Perry
Brad Drew	9	Hooker	9	Danny Buderus
Michael Vella	10	Prop forward	10	Matt Parsons
Nathan Hindmarsh	11	Second row	11	Steve Simpson
Ian Hindmarsh	12	Second row	12	Ben Kennedy
Daniel Wagon	13	Lock forward	13	Bill Peden
PJ Marsh	14	Interchange	14	Paul Marquet
Andrew Ryan	15	Interchange	15	Clinton O'Brien
Alex Chan	16	Interchange	16	Glenn Grief
David Solomona	17	Interchange	17	Daniel Abraham
Brian Smith		Coach		Michael Hagan
RLP

== Match details ==
=== First half ===
Newcastle were first to score with a try to Bill Peden in the third minute, with Andrew Johns converting to take the Knights out to a 6–0 lead. Four minutes later, the Newcastle side scored again through Steve Simpson, with Johns failing to convert, taking the score to 10–0. Johns not long after took a shot at penalty goal due to a leg pull from Brad Drew which was penalised by referee Bill Harrigan to make the score 12–0. By the 24th minute, Newcastle already had an 18–0 lead to the courtesy of Peden’s second try and another conversion by Johns.

Not long after, the Parramatta side had their best chance of the first half with Andrew Ryan getting over the line but he was held up by Simpson (who was injured in the process of making the tackle) and failed to score. In the following set, Parramatta spread the ball wide to the left, but a pass which would have put Luke Burt in for a try in the corner was directed well behind him and he failed to catch it. In the 32nd minute, Ben Kennedy scored for the Newcastle club, with Johns converting again to take the score to 24–0. Parramatta had a couple of chances in the Knights’ half after that but failed to capitalise on their opportunities, so the score remained the same until half time. The 24 points scored by Newcastle remains the highest total by a team in the first half of a grand final and the biggest ever grand final half-time lead.

=== Second half ===
Parramatta were the first to score in the second half to make the score 24–6. In the 64th minute, Newcastle seemed to have wrapped up the 2001 Premiership following a wide pass from Peden to Johns who put up a towering bomb to Timana Tahu's wing. Tahu got tangled up with Burt before getting the ball down about 50 cm inside the touch-in-goal line. Two minutes later, however, Jamie Lyon scored for Parramatta to make it 28–12, thus keeping the Eels in the game. Three minutes later, the Newcastle side once again made the margin three converted tries at 30–12 thanks to a penalty goal to Johns after an attempted short goal-line drop-out by Drew went out on the full. One more try each to both Lyon and Brett Hodgson in the final ten minutes got the scoreline back to a difference of a converted try at 30–24, but despite this comeback, there was to be no further scoring in the match, leaving the Newcastle side to clinch the 2001 Premiership, their second title in five seasons. The combined tally of 54 points for the match remains the second-highest in a grand final after the 1951 Grand Final in which 56 were scored (an era during which tries were worth only three points). The 2001 decider was also the first grand final in which 20 or more points were scored in both halves, a feat which was replicated in the 2020 NRL Grand Final.

Newcastle have not played in another grand final since then, whilst Parramatta were unsuccessful in both 2009 when the club lost to the Melbourne Storm, and 2022 when the club lost to Penrith Panthers, stretching their premiership drought which goes back to 1986.

== Match summary ==
2001 NRL Grand Final

Sunday, 30 September
20:00 AEST (UTC+10)

Parramatta Eels	24 – 30	Newcastle Knights
Tries: 4 Lyon 66', 73'; Hodgson 58', 79'; Goals: 4 Luke Burt 58', 67', 73', 80' (4/4)	1st: 0–24; 2nd: 24–6; Report	Tries: 5 Peden 4', 21'; Simpson 7'; Kennedy 32'; Tahu 63'; Goals: 5 Johns 5', pen 13', 23', 32', pen 71' (5/7); Field goals: Johns (0/3)

Stadium Australia, Sydney
Attendance: 90,414
Referee: Bill Harrigan
Touch judges: Steve Richards, Shayne Hayne
Clive Churchill Medal: Andrew Johns (Newcastle)

== Aftermath ==
In 2011, 10 years after Newcastle's grand final victory, Kennedy spoke to the media at The Once a Knight reunion lunch recalling his memories of the 2001 final. Kennedy said "They came into the game under a shitload of pressure but for us, it was just a good time and a heap of fun. Parra were shitting themselves and we were having a good time". Newcastle centre Mark Hughes recalled the game saying "I remember how nervous and stiff Parramatta were". "The Parramatta players came dressed to the grand final breakfast wearing "Miami Vice black suits."

Newcastle prop Josh Perry said of the week building up to the game that he knew Newcastle were going to win saying "It started at the midweek grand final breakfast. We lined up next to Parramatta to walk out onto the stage, and they were so tense. They weren't talking to us, while we were being ourselves and having a joke and enjoying the moment – they were anything but that. From that moment on we knew we were going to win." Parramatta captain Nathan Cayless in 2017 spoke of the game saying "It was disappointing for us, and it took a long time to get into another grand final [2009]. We'd had a good season, and just wanted to stick to what we had done, and what worked for us so well. We didn’t change too much and just looked at it as if it were another game of football. Newcastle just played out of their skins".

It would be Newcastle's last appearance in an NRL Grand Final for 25 years, eventually breaking the drought in 2026.

== See also ==
- 2002 World Club Challenge
