= Teddy Sadaoui =

Former France international rugby league footballer

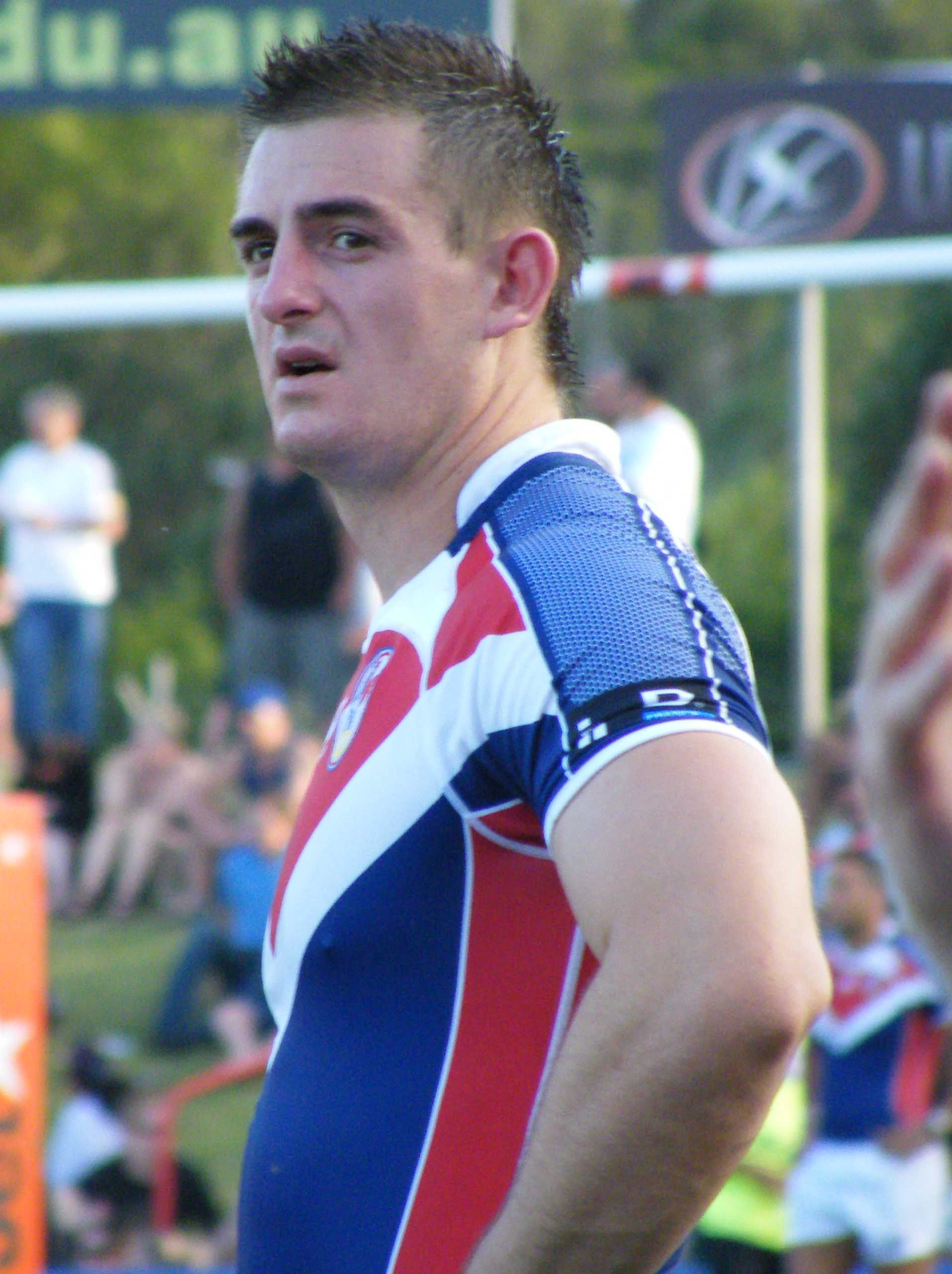
- Sadaoui playing for France in 2008

Personal information
- Born: 18 April 1983 (age 43) Carcassonne, Aude, France

Playing information
- Height: 1.90 m (6 ft 3 in)
- Weight: 106 kg (16 st 10 lb)
- Position: Wing, Centre, Second-row
Club
Years	Team	Pld	T	G	FG	P
2005–06	Catalans Dragons	7	0	0	0	0
2007–	AS Carcassonne	164	50	0	0	200
	Total	171	50	0	0	200
Representative
Years	Team	Pld	T	G	FG	P
2003–12	France	25	6	0	0	24

Teddy Sadaoui (born 18 April 1983, in France) is a French professional rugby league footballer who plays for AS Carcassonne in the French Rugby League Championship. A France international representative centre, he previously played for Catalans Dragons of Super League and was released at the end of 2006's Super League XI.

He was named in the France squad for the 2008 Rugby League World Cup.

He was also named in the French national squad for the 2009 Four Nations. He played again for France in the 2010 European Cup.
