= Ian Hindmarsh =

Australian rugby league footballer

Personal information
- Full name: Ian Bruce Hindmarsh
- Born: 31 March 1977 (age 49) Bowral, New South Wales, Australia

Playing information
- Height: 183 cm (6 ft 0 in)
- Weight: 97 kg (15 st 4 lb)
- Position: Second-row
Club
Years	Team	Pld	T	G	FG	P
1999–02	Parramatta Eels	71	10	0	0	40
2003–05	Canberra Raiders	67	5	0	0	20
2006	Catalans Dragons	27	3	0	0	12
2007	Parramatta Eels	24	4	0	1	17
	Total	189	22	0	1	89
Representative
Years	Team	Pld	T	G	FG	P
2001	NSW Country	1	0	0	0	0
- Education: Patrician Brothers' College, Fairfield
- Relatives: Nathan Hindmarsh (brother); Jim Hindmarsh (uncle)

Ian Hindmarsh (born 31 March 1977) is an Australian former professional rugby league footballer who played in the 1990s and 2000s. Hindmarsh attended renowned rugby league school Fairfield Patrician Brothers College. A Country New South Wales representative forward, he played his club football in the National Rugby League for Australian clubs Parramatta Eels and Canberra Raiders as well as in the Super League for French club the Catalans Dragons.

== Background ==
Hindmarsh was born in Bowral, New South Wales, Australia.

== Playing career ==
Hindmarsh started his career with Parramatta Eels and made his first grade debut for the club in Round 10 1999 against the Auckland Warriors in which Hindmarsh scored a try during a 28–6 victory.

In 2000, Hindmarsh played 19 games including the club's 16–10 loss against the Brisbane Broncos. In 2001, Hindmarsh played 28 games including the club's 2001 NRL grand final loss to the Newcastle Knights.

Salary cap restrictions forced the Parramatta Eels to release him and he signed with the Canberra Raiders. Hindmarsh played three seasons with the Canberra Raiders before signing on with the Catalans Dragons of the Super League. After one season with the French side, Hindmarsh decided to return to Australia to finish his career with the Parramatta Eels, playing as a second-row with his younger brother Nathan. In his last season with Parramatta and in the top grade, Hindmarsh played 24 games as the club finished 5th. Hindmarsh's final game was Parramatta's preliminary final defeat against Melbourne at Docklands Stadium.

== Post-playing ==
At the end of the 2007 season, Hindmarsh retired from professional football to work full-time on the family dairy farm.
