= Lionel Teixido =

French rugby league footballer

Personal information
- Born: 26 September 1979 (age 46) France

Playing information
- Position: Hooker
Club
Years	Team	Pld	T	G	FG	P
2003–07	Catalans Dragons	30	4	0	0	16
2008	Doncaster	4	0	0	0	0
	Total	34	4	0	0	16

Lionel Teixido (born 26 September 1979) is a French former professional rugby league footballer who played in the 2000s, he played for the Catalans Dragons in the Super League competition

Texido played for Union Treiziste Catalane in the French Elite 1 and then in the Super League following their rebranding as Catalans Dragons. In the 2007–08 season, Texido played for RC Albi who were runners-up in the Lord Derby Cup before joining Doncaster in National League Two. Texido then returned to France joining Palau Broncos who won the Elite 2 championship in the 2009–10 season.
