= Chris Beattie =

Australian rugby league footballer

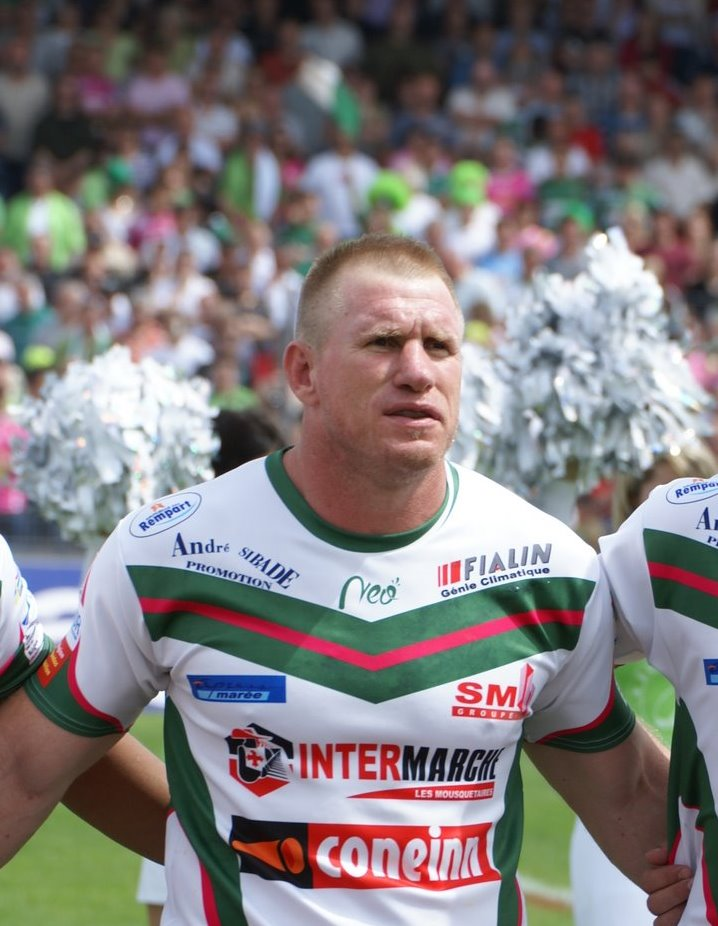
- Beattie while playing for Lézignan Sangliers in 2009

Personal information
- Full name: Chris Beattie
- Born: 26 August 1975 (age 51) Ipswich, Queensland, Australia

Playing information
- Height: 188 cm (6 ft 2 in)
- Weight: 108 kg (17 st 0 lb)
- Position: Prop
Club
Years	Team	Pld	T	G	FG	P
2000–04	Cronulla-Sutherland	86	6	0	0	24
2006	Catalans Dragons	29	4	0	0	16
2007	Sydney Roosters	6	0	0	0	0
2008	Lézignan Sangliers	0	0	0	0	0
	Total	121	10	0	0	40
Representative
Years	Team	Pld	T	G	FG	P
2001–02	Queensland	3	0	0	0	0

Chris Beattie (born 26 August 1975 in Ipswich, Queensland) is an Australian former professional rugby league footballer who last played for Lézignan Sangliers in the Elite One Championship rugby league competition in France.

== Playing career ==
Beattie made his debut in the National Rugby League in 2000, playing for the Cronulla-Sutherland Sharks, as a 24-year-old.

A regular in the Sharks side, Beattie went on to represent Queensland in the State of Origin, playing two games in 2001 and one in 2002.

Beattie was signed by the Perpignan-based Catalans Dragons in their inaugural Super League season in 2006, after five seasons with the Sharks.

He signed a one-year deal with the Sydney City Roosters for 2007, and in 2008 he joined the Lézignan Sangliers, a French rugby league club.
