= Sean Rudder =

Australian rugby league footballer

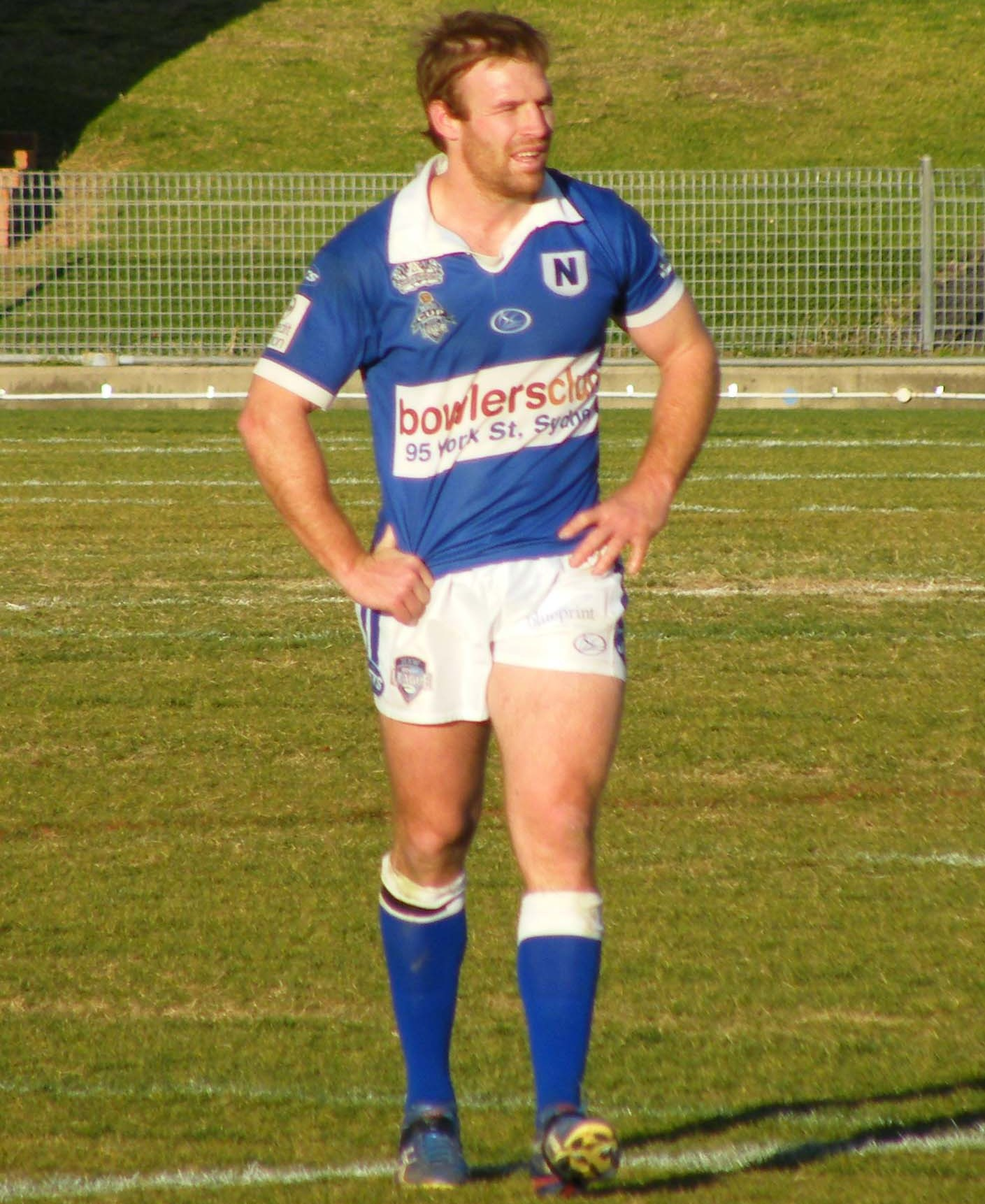

Personal information
- Full name: Sean Rudder
- Born: 13 February 1979 (age 47) Newcastle, New South Wales, Australia

Playing information
- Height: 186 cm (6 ft 1 in)
- Weight: 100 kg (15 st 10 lb)
- Position: Five-eighth, Second-row, Lock
Club
Years	Team	Pld	T	G	FG	P
1998–03	Newcastle Knights	131	21	0	0	84
2004	Castleford Tigers	13	3	0	0	12
2006	Catalans Dragons	26	7	0	0	28
2008	Sydney Roosters	1	0	0	0	0
	Total	171	31	0	0	124

Sean Rudder (born 13 February 1979) is an Australian former professional rugby league footballer who played in the 1990s and 2000s. Rudder played for the Newcastle Knights, Sydney Roosters, Castleford Tigers and the Catalans Dragons as a five-eighth or loose forward.

== Playing career ==
Rudder made his first grade debut for Newcastle in Round 17 1998 against Penrith. Rudder played at five-eighth for the Newcastle Knights in their upset 2001 NRL Grand Final victory over the Parramatta Eels. Having won the 2001 NRL Premiership, the Newcastle side traveled to England to play the 2002 World Club Challenge against Super League champions, the Bradford Bulls. Rudder played at five-eighth in Newcastle's loss. In 2004, Rudder joined Castleford in the Super League. Castleford finished the 2004 season on the bottom of the table and were relegated. In 2005, he played for Saint-Estève XIII Catalan before signing with the Catalans Dragons who were admitted to the Super League in 2006. Rudder played at five-eighth in Catalan's inaugural Super League match against Wigan with Catalans winning 38-30.

Rudder later played for Newtown in the NSWRL Premier League. In round 16 of the 2008 NRL season, Rudder was called into Sydney Roosters side against Canterbury. He played at five-eighth in the club's 24-14 victory.
