= Mark Hughes (rugby league, born 1976) =

Australian rugby league footballer

Personal information
- Born: 15 December 1976 (age 48) Kurri Kurri, New South Wales, Australia

Playing information
- Height: 186 cm (6 ft 1 in)
- Weight: 93 kg (14 st 9 lb)
- Position: Fullback, Centre
Club
Years	Team	Pld	T	G	FG	P
1997–05	Newcastle Knights	161	66	0	0	264
2006	Catalans Dragons	26	11	0	0	44
	Total	187	77	0	0	308
Representative
Years	Team	Pld	T	G	FG	P
2001	New South Wales	3	0	0	0	0
2002	NSW Country Origin	1	0	0	0	0

Mark Hughes (born 15 December 1976 in Kurri Kurri, New South Wales) is an Australian former professional rugby league footballer who played in the 1990s and 2000s. He played club football for the Newcastle Knights in the Australian National Rugby League (NRL) and later for the Catalans Dragons in the Super League, primarily as a fullback or centre. In 2013, he was diagnosed with brain cancer and subsequently established the Mark Hughes Foundation.

== Club career ==
Hughes played for the Kurri Kurri Bulldogs in their 1995 grand final victory. He then joined the Newcastle Knights and in his debut season he was on the wing in Newcastle's maiden Grand Final victory over Manly in the 1997 Optus Cup final. He subsequently shifted to the centres where he played in the Knights' 2001 NRL grand final victory.

Having won the 2001 NRL Premiership, the Knights traveled to England to play the 2002 World Club Challenge against Super League champions, the Bradford Bulls. Hughes played at centre in Newcastle's loss. Hughes was selected for all three games for the New South Wales Blues in the 2001 Origin series where he played at fullback. In 2011, 10 years after The 2001 final at The once a knight reunion lunch, Hughes spoke about his memories of The 2001 final and the buildup to the game. Hughes said "I remember how nervous and stiff The Parramatta players were and how they were dressed in their "Miami Vice black suits" to the grand final breakfast".

Injuries hampered Hughes' later career and limited his representative appearances. At the end of 2005, he left the Knights to join French club the Catalans Dragons for the 2006 Super League season.

In 2010 he was named fullback of Kurri Rugby League Club's team of the century.

== Career highlights ==
- First Grade Debut: 1997 – Round 9, Newcastle Knights v Gold Coast Chargers at Gold Coast Stadium, 3 May. He scored a try on debut.
- Representative selection: 2001, State of Origin
- Premierships: 1997, Newcastle Knights defeated Manly-Warringah Sea Eagles 22–16 and 2001, Newcastle Knights defeated Parramatta Eels 30–24.
