= Adel Fellous =

French rugby league footballer

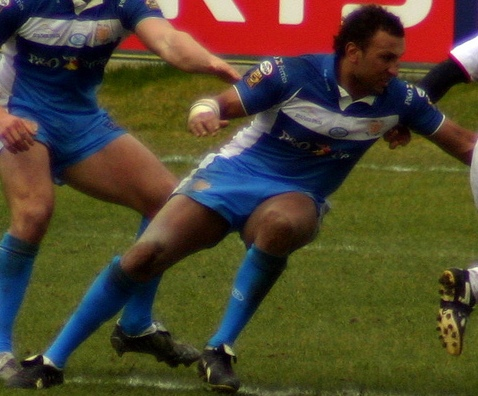

Personal information
- Born: 16 February 1978 (age 48) Gaillac, Tarn, France
- Height: 184 cm (6 ft 0 in)
- Weight: 100 kg (15 st 10 lb)

Playing information
- Position: Prop
Club
Years	Team	Pld	T	G	FG	P
2002–07	Catalans Dragons	38	4	0	0	16
2008	Toulouse Olympique	1	0	0	0	0
2008	Hull FC	3	0	0	0	0
2009–10	Lézignan Sangliers	2	1	0	0	4
	Total	44	5	0	0	20
Representative
Years	Team	Pld	T	G	FG	P
2001–08	France	21	1	0	0	4

Adel Fellous (born 16 February 1978) is a former professional rugby league footballer who last played for the Lézignan Sangliers club in the Elite One Championship. His usual position was prop-forward. He was an experienced French international who had previously played for the Catalans Dragons, Hull FC and Toulouse Olympique.

== Background ==
Fellous was born in Gaillac, France.

== Career ==
In 2008, he joined injury-hit Hull F.C. on loan until the end of March.

He was named in the France squad for the 2008 Rugby League World Cup and played in two matches.
