= 2006 Super League season =

British rugby league season

Super League XI
- League: Super League
- Duration: 28 Rounds
- Teams: 12
- Highest attendance: 18,358; Wigan Warriors vs St. Helens (17 April)
- Lowest attendance: 3,046; Salford City Reds vs Harlequins (11 Aug)
- Attendance: 1,516,342 ▲ (average 9,026)
- Broadcast partners: Sky Sports

2006 Season
- Champions: St. Helens; 5th Super League title 12th British title
- League Leaders: St. Helens
- Man of Steel: (England) Paul Wellens
- Top point-scorer(s): (Australia) Jamie Lyon (316)
- Top try-scorer(s): (Australia) Justin Murphy (26)

Promotion and relegation
- Promoted from National League One: Hull Kingston Rovers
- Relegated to National League One: Castleford

Engage Super League XI was the official name for the year 2006's Super League season in the sport of rugby league in Europe. Bradford Bulls were looking to retain the title they won in Super League X.

The competition kicked off the weekend after the World Club Challenge. This season saw the entry of the Catalans Dragons, who are the first French team to compete since the demise of Paris Saint-Germain at the end of Super League II.

Castleford Tigers were relegated from the Super League on Saturday 16 September after finishing the regular season in 11th place (Catalans Dragons were exempt from relegation and finished 12th, therefore 11th-placed team was relegated).

In the Grand Final St. Helens beat Hull F.C. by 26–4 at Old Trafford, Manchester in front of a crowd of 72,575 which is a record for a Super League Grand Final. At half time the score stood at 10–4 for St. Helens. Saints raced ahead in the second half with several tries. This victory, in addition to their Challenge Cup win and League Leaders' Shield, meant that they had completed the league treble.

The 2006 Super League generated the highest weekly average attendance in the 11-year history of the competition. The average weekly attendance for the regular season stood at 9,026, generated by an aggregate attendance of 1,516,342 supporters. This is an increase on the 2005 season average of 8,887.

== Events ==
The lead up to round 18 saw the shock move of Stuart Fielden from Bradford Bulls to Wigan Warriors for a Super League record fee of £450,000. Despite a 30–12 home win over Warrington Wolves, Wigan Warriors remain bottom of the league after round 18.

In the latter part of the season, following round 19, the bottom half of the league table was very close, with 6 teams able to reach the play-offs and 5 still at risk of relegation.

Wigan left the bottom of the table for the first time in three months following round 20 but were still in the relegation position as Les Catalans were exempt from relegation. Warrington ended their bad run of results by beating Huddersfield in the same round.

The next week Wigan climbed out of the relegation zone after beating Salford - their fifth consecutive win. Wakefield Trinity had a chance to put Wigan back in the drop zone but blew a 20–0 lead against Huddersfield to allow them to record a crucial victory. Elsewhere Hull's Richard Horne became the first player in 91 years to score tries in eleven straight games for the club in their victory over Warrington.

Hull's 13 match winning streak came to an end at Harlequins in round 22 but 2nd place rivals Leeds lost to leaders St Helens, who had Jamie Lyon sent off. Wigan's recent revival was halted by Warrington.

In round 23, Wakefield Trinity re-ignited the relegation battle with a win against local rivals Castleford, despite being reduced to 11 men by the end of the game. Leeds lost the battle for second place, and their third league match in a row.

The relegation battle went down to the wire as Wakefield Trinity beat Bradford while Castleford lost to Salford in the penultimate round of the season. The two clubs at risk of relegation, Wakefield Trinity and Castleford, were scheduled to meet in what had become a relegation decider in the last match of the regular season.

St Helens receive the League Leaders' Shield for a second successive year as recognition for finishing top of the competition league table for the regular season. Harlequins secured survival after beating Wigan. Salford secure a top-6 play-off spot for the first time in their history.

At the end of the regular season, Castleford were relegated as a consequence of their 29–17 defeat away to Wakefield Trinity.

== Table ==
| Pos | Team | Pld | W | D | L | PF | PA | PD | Pts | Qualification |
|---|---|---|---|---|---|---|---|---|---|---|
| 1 | St Helens (L, C) | 28 | 24 | 0 | 4 | 939 | 430 | +509 | 48 | Semi-final |
| 2 | Hull F.C. | 28 | 20 | 0 | 8 | 720 | 578 | +142 | 40 | Semi-final |
| 3 | Leeds Rhinos | 28 | 19 | 0 | 9 | 869 | 543 | +326 | 38 | Elimination play-offs |
| 4 | Bradford Bulls | 28 | 16 | 2 | 10 | 802 | 568 | +234 | 32 (Note: Bradford deducted 2 points for salary cap breaches in 2005.) | Elimination play-offs |
| 5 | Salford City Reds | 28 | 13 | 0 | 15 | 600 | 539 | +61 | 26 | Elimination play-offs |
| 6 | Warrington Wolves | 28 | 13 | 0 | 15 | 743 | 721 | +22 | 26 | Elimination play-offs |
| 7 | Harlequins | 28 | 11 | 1 | 16 | 556 | 823 | −267 | 23 | |
| 8 | Wigan Warriors | 28 | 12 | 0 | 16 | 644 | 715 | −71 | 22 (Note: Wigan deducted 2 points for salary cap breaches in 2005.) | |
| 9 | Huddersfield Giants | 28 | 11 | 0 | 17 | 609 | 753 | −144 | 22 | |
| 10 | Wakefield Trinity Wildcats | 28 | 10 | 0 | 18 | 591 | 717 | −126 | 20 | |
| 11 | Castleford Tigers (R) | 28 | 9 | 1 | 18 | 575 | 968 | −393 | 19 | Relegation to National League One |
| 12 | Catalans Dragons (X) | 28 | 8 | 0 | 20 | 601 | 894 | −293 | 16 | |

Source: Rugby League Project
Rules for classification: 1) Points; 2) Points difference; 3) Number of points scored;
(C) Champions; (L) League Leaders' Shield Winners; (R) Relegated; (X) Exempt from relegation

== Play-offs ==
Elimination play-offs
22 September 2006
3 | Leeds | 17
6 | Warrington | 18
23 September 2006
4 | Bradford | 52
5 | Salford | 6

Qualifying / elimination semifinals
29 September 2006
1 | St. Helens | 12
2 | Hull | 8
30 September 2006
Bradford | 40
Warrington | 24

Elimination final
6 October 2006
Hull | 19
Bradford | 12

Grand Final
11 October 2006
St. Helens | 26
Hull | 4

=== Grand Final ===
In the Grand Final St. Helens beat Hull F.C. by 26–4 at Old Trafford, Manchester. At half time the score stood at 10-4 for St. Helens. Saints raced ahead in the second half with several tries. This victory, in addition to their Challenge Cup win and League Leaders' Shield, meant that they had completed the league treble.

== See also ==
- Super League
- 2006 Challenge Cup
- Rugby league in 2006
