= Justin Murphy (rugby league) =

Australian rugby league coach & former France international rugby league footballer

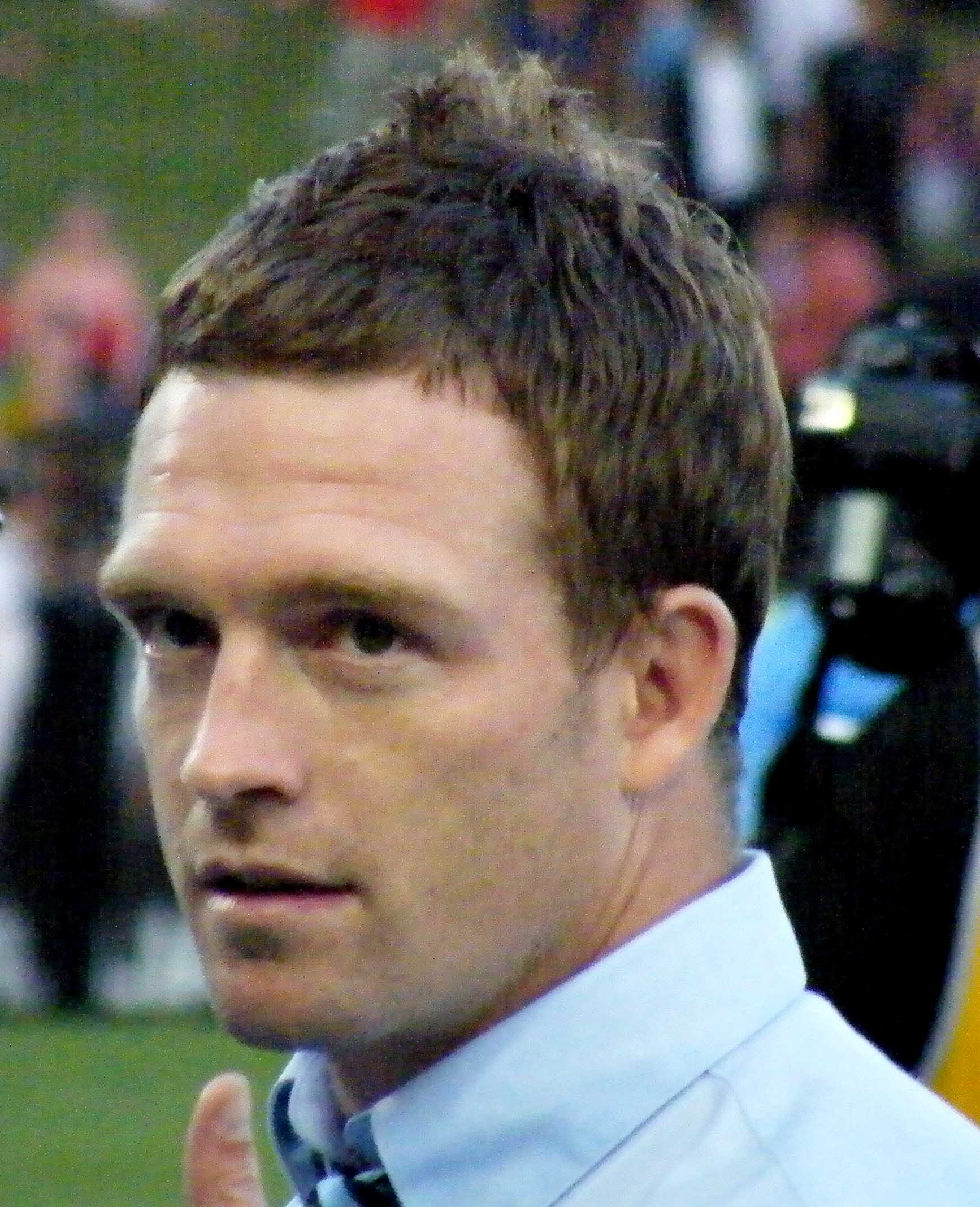

Personal information
- Born: 14 February 1978 (age 48) Sydney, New South Wales, Australia

Playing information
- Height: 5 ft 10 in (1.78 m)
- Weight: 12 st 6 lb (79 kg)
- Position: Wing
Club
Years	Team	Pld	T	G	FG	P
1999–00	Canterbury Bulldogs	1	1	0	0	4
2001–04	New Zealand Warriors	43	10	0	0	40
2004–04	Widnes Vikings	5	1	0	0	4
2004–05	UTC	26	38	0	0
2006–08	Catalans Dragons	66	54	0	0	216
	Total	141	104	0	0	264
Representative
Years	Team	Pld	T	G	FG	P
2007–08	France	6	2	0	0	8

Coaching information
Club
Years	Team	Gms	W	D	L	W%
2010	Toowoomba Valleys	26	23		3	88
2011	Toowoomba Valleys	26	22		4	85
2020	Sporting Treiziste Toulonnais ELITE 2	16	2		14	13
2021	Saint-Estève XIII Catalan ELITE 1	20	14		8	70
2022–2024	Saint-Estève XIII Catalan U19 ELITE	42	40		2	95
2024–2025	Saint-Estève XIII Catalan SUPER 13	48	30		18	63
2025–2026	Saint-Estève XIII Catalan U19 ELITE	29	27		2	93
	Total	207	158	0	51	76

Justin Murphy is a Rugby League coach who is the head coach of Saint-Estève XIII Catalan in FFR Elite One Championship; previously coaching Toulon Métropole XIII in the Elite Two Championship, and a former professional rugby league footballer who played for France at international level and in the NRL and Super League competitions.

== Background ==
Murphy was born in Sydney, New South Wales, Australia. Grew up in Narrabri where he started playing Rugby League before going to board at St Johns College Woodlawn a renowned rugby league nursery. In year 9 he started at St Mary's College Toowoomba where he would finish his schooling.

== Playing career ==
While with the Brisbane Broncos, he represented QLD and Australia U19s also playing for the Reserve team Past Brothers in the Queensland Cup.

Murphy played for the New Zealand Warriors on the wing in their 2002 NRL Grand Final loss to the Sydney Roosters.

Murphy joined the Catalans Dragons club at the end of 2004 when the club was in the national French competition. He quickly established himself as one of the better players, topping the try scoring charts and helping the club become the first French team to go through a season without defeat, winning the Coupe de France and the French championship where he was man of the match in the Final. It was his first full season in Super League that saw him shoot to prominence. He finished as Top try-scorer in 2006's Super League XI with 26 tries and also making the Super League "Dream Team" despite his team, the Catalans Dragons coming bottom of the table.

He was part of the French squad for the 2008 World Cup.

Following retirement, Murphy moved to Toowoomba.
