= John Wilson (rugby league, born 1978) =

France international rugby league footballer

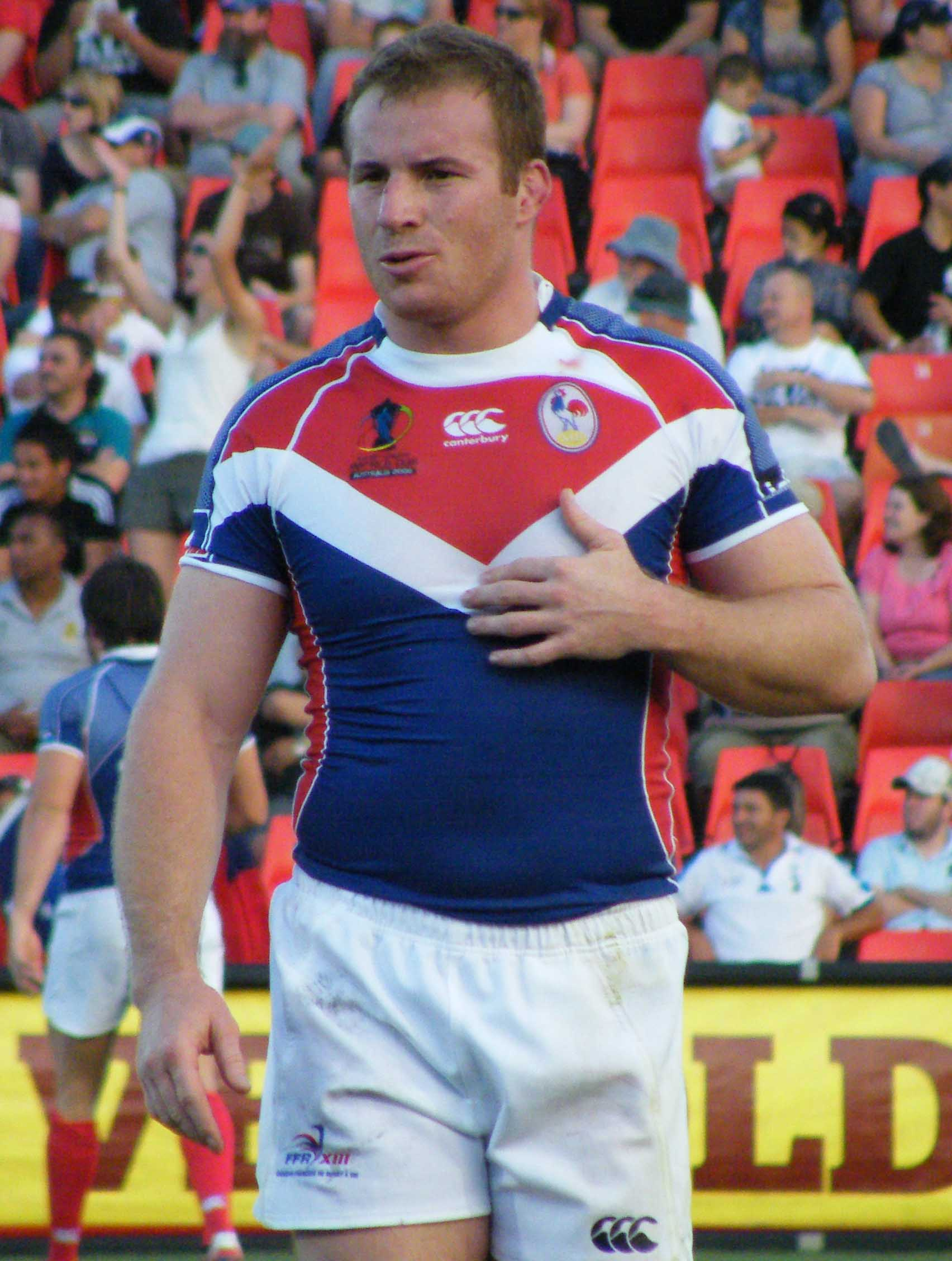

Personal information
- Full name: John Wilson
- Born: 2 July 1978 (age 47) Coffs Harbour, New South Wales, Australia

Playing information
- Height: 1.85 m (6 ft 1 in)
- Weight: 93 kg (14 st 9 lb)
- Position: Centre, Five-eighth, Lock
Club
Years	Team	Pld	T	G	FG	P
2000	Parramatta Eels	3	0	0	0	0
2001–05	Wests Tigers	62	30	0	0	120
2006–08	Catalans Dragons	77	25	0	0	100
	Total	142	55	0	0	220
Representative
Years	Team	Pld	T	G	FG	P
2008	France	3	2	0	0	8

John Wilson (born 2 July 1978) is a former France international rugby league footballer who last played for the Catalans Dragons in the Super League. Wilson previously played for the Parramatta Eels and the Wests Tigers in the National Rugby League (NRL). Wilson's usual position was second-row, but he had mainly played as a centre for the Catalans Dragons.

== Background ==
Wilson was born in Coffs Harbour, New South Wales, Australia.

== Playing career ==
Wilson was one of the most experienced campaigners in the fledgling Dragons outfit. Nicknamed 'Sergeant' by English Dragons followers after the Dad's Army character, he was a popular figure with fans.

Wilson was named in the France squad for the 2008 Rugby League World Cup.

== Career highlights ==
- Junior Club: Wentworthville
- First Grade Debut: Round 22, Parramatta v New Zealand Warriors at Ericsson Stadium, 30 June 2000
- First Grade Record: 65 appearances scoring 30 tries
