= Aurélien Cologni =

Professional RL coach & former France international rugby league footballer

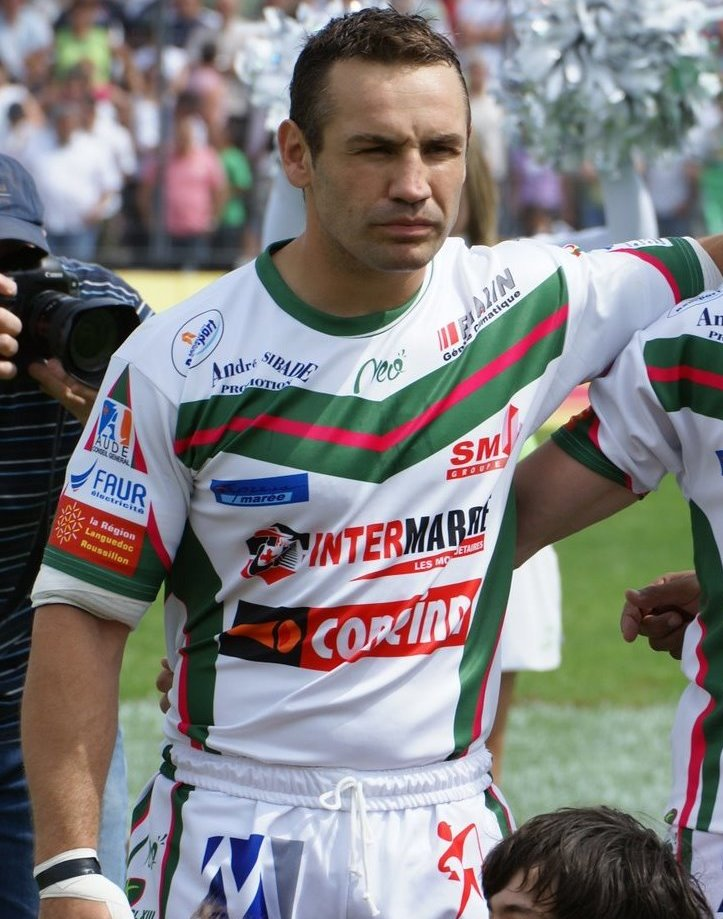

Personal information
- Born: 11 February 1978 (age 48) France
- Height: 1.80 m (5 ft 11 in)
- Weight: 95 kg (14 st 13 lb)

Playing information
- Position: Second-row
Club
Years	Team	Pld	T	G	FG	P
2006	Catalans Dragons	5	3	0	0	12
2007	Crusaders RL	5	1	0	0	4
2007–15	Lézignan Sangliers	63	31	0	0	124
	Total	73	35	0	0	140
Representative
Years	Team	Pld	T	G	FG	P
2005–07	France	3	0	0	0	0

Coaching information
Club
Years	Team	Gms	W	D	L	W%
	Lézignan Sangliers
Representative
Years	Team	Gms	W	D	L	W%
2011–12	France	4	2	0	2	50
2016–20	France	9	4	0	5	44
- Source: As of 10 February 2021
- Father: Jean-Jacques Cologni

Aurélien Cologni (born 11 February 1978 in France) is the head coach of FC Lezignan in the Elite One Championship and the French national rugby league team. Cologni is a former player, a French international who played for the Lézignan Sangliers club in France's Elite One Championship. He is the son of Jean-Jacques Cologni, who was also a rugby league player and coach.

== Coaching ==
He coached the France 9s squad at the 2019 Rugby League World Cup 9s.

Cologni was France head coach on two separate occasions.
