= Frédéric Zitter =

France international rugby league footballer

Personal information
- Born: 28 October 1979 (age 47) France

Playing information
- Position: Wing
Club
Years	Team	Pld	T	G	FG	P
2001–02	Toulouse Olympique	2
2004	Limoux	2	1	0	0	4
2004	Featherstone Rovers	19	8	0	0	32
2005	Barrow Raiders	25	14	0	0	56
2006	Catalans Dragons	2	2	0	0	8
	Total	50	25	0	0	100
Representative
Years	Team	Pld	T	G	FG	P
2002–06	France	7	5	0	0	20

Frédéric Zitter (born 28 October 1979) is a French professional rugby league footballer who played for Catalans Dragons in the Super League competition. He has also represented the French national team, scoring a try against Australia in 2004.

Zitter signed for Catalans Dragons from the Barrow Raiders, making one Super League appearance during the 2006 season.
