= David Berthezène =

Former France international rugby league footballer

David Berthezene
Personal information
- Born: 27 October 1980 (age 45) France

Playing information
- Position: Hooker
Club
Years	Team	Pld	T	G	FG	P
2006–07	Catalans Dragons	21	0	0	0	0
2007	Salford City Reds	10	0	0	0	0
	Total	31	0	0	0	0
Representative
Years	Team	Pld	T	G	FG	P
2002–05	France	15	2	0	0	8

David Berthezène (born 27 October 1980) is a French former professional rugby league footballer.

== Career ==
Berthezène played for the Catalans Dragons and the Salford City Reds in the Super League competition. His position of choice is hooker.

At the international level, Berthezène represented France.
