= Julien Rinaldi =

Former France international rugby league footballer

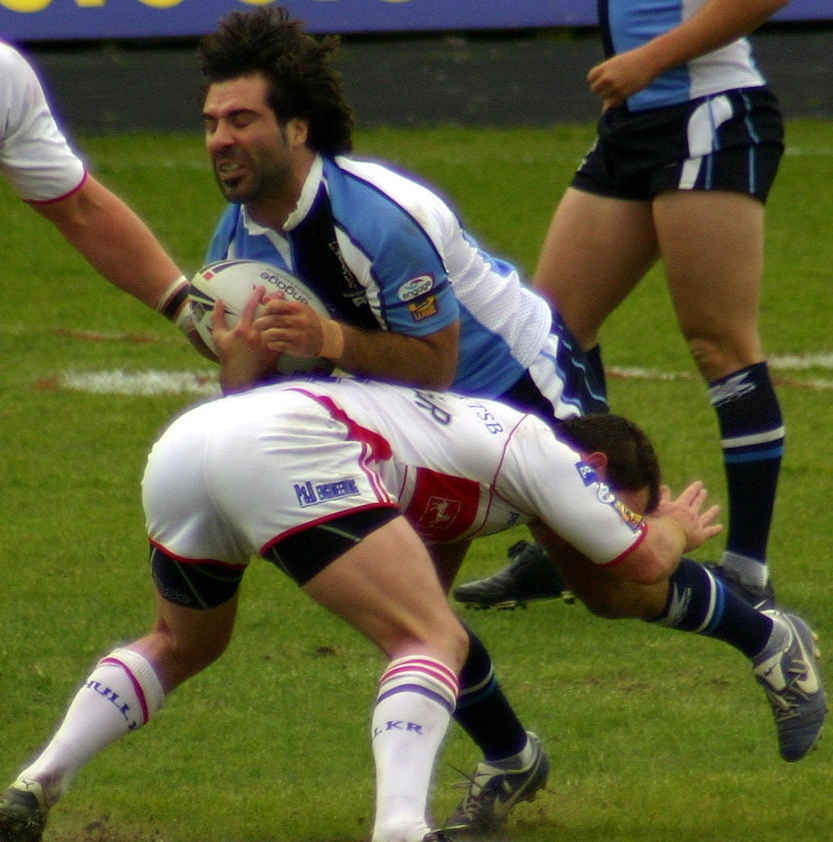

Personal information
- Born: 27 April 1979 (age 47) Villeneuve-lès-Avignon, Gard, France
- Height: 1.775 m (5 ft 9.9 in)
- Weight: 87 kg (13 st 10 lb)

Playing information
- Position: Hooker, Scrum-half
Club
Years	Team	Pld	T	G	FG	P
2002	Wakefield Trinity Wildcats	3	1	0	0	4
2006	Catalans Dragons	24	3	1	0	14
2007–09	Harlequins RL	52	9	0	0	36
2009	Bradford Bulls	7	1	0	0	4
2010–11	Wakefield Trinity Wildcats	34	5	0	0	20
2012	London Broncos	19	1	0	0	4
	Total	139	20	1	0	82
Representative
Years	Team	Pld	T	G	FG	P
2000–08	France	35
- Source: As of 15 February 2012

Julien Rinaldi (born 27 April 1979) is a French former professional rugby league footballer who played for the Wakefield Trinity Wildcats, Catalans Dragons, London Broncos and the Bradford Bulls in the Super League. He also played for and coached the Villeneuve Leopards in the Elite One Championship in France. Rinaldi was a France international. His preferred position is scrum-half, however, he has spent most of his career at hooker.

Rinaldi has also played for the Bradford Bulls, Sunshine Coast Sea Eagles, the Catalans Dragons and the Wakefield Trinity Wildcats.

== Background ==
Rinaldi was born in Villeneuve-lès-Avignon, France.

== Playing career ==
He was named in the France squad for the 2008 Rugby League World Cup. Rinaldi signed a one-month deal to play for the Wakefield Trinity Wildcats after returning from France. He then signed a new contract to remain with Wakefield Trinity until the end of the 2011 season. He played in the 2012 London Broncos season before retiring from Super League.
