= Bruno Verges =

France international rugby league footballer

Personal information
- Full name: Bruno Verges
- Born: 18 November 1975 (age 49) France

Playing information
- Position: Wing
Club
Years	Team	Pld	T	G	FG	P
2006	Catalans Dragons	28	9	0	0	36
Representative
Years	Team	Pld	T	G	FG	P
1997–03	France	3	0	0	0	0

Bruno Verges (born 18 November 1975) is a French former professional rugby league footballer who played as a winger for the Catalans Dragons in the Super League.
