= Renaud Guigue =

Former French rugby footballer and coach

Personal information
- Full name: Renaud Guigue
- Born: 14 August 1979 (age 47) France

Playing information
- Position: right wing, fullback
Club
Years	Team	Pld	T	G	FG	P
2002–06	Saint-Estève XIII Catalan	26	6	0	0	24
2006	Catalans Dragons	21	3	0	0	12
	Total	47	9	0	0	36
Representative
Years	Team	Pld	T	G	FG	P
2001–06	France	17	4	0	0	16

Coaching information
Club
Years	Team	Gms	W	D	L	W%
2018	Sporting Olympique Avignon
Representative
Years	Team	Gms	W	D	L	W%
2015	France	1	1			100

Renaud Guigue (born 14 August 1979) is a French professional rugby league footballer who previously played for the Catalans Dragons in the Super League competition. He is the son of Jacques Guigue, who was also a French rugby league international. Guigue was included on the 2001 French rugby league tour of New Zealand and Papua New Guinea.

He was named in the France training squad for the 2008 Rugby League World Cup but did not make the final squad.

During Richard Agar's spell as France head coach, Renaud took charge for one fixture in the 68–8 defeat of Serbia in Perpignan on 22 May 2015.

As of 2018, he is coach of Sporting Olympique Avignon
