= Sébastien Raguin =

French rugby league footballer and coach

Séb Raguin
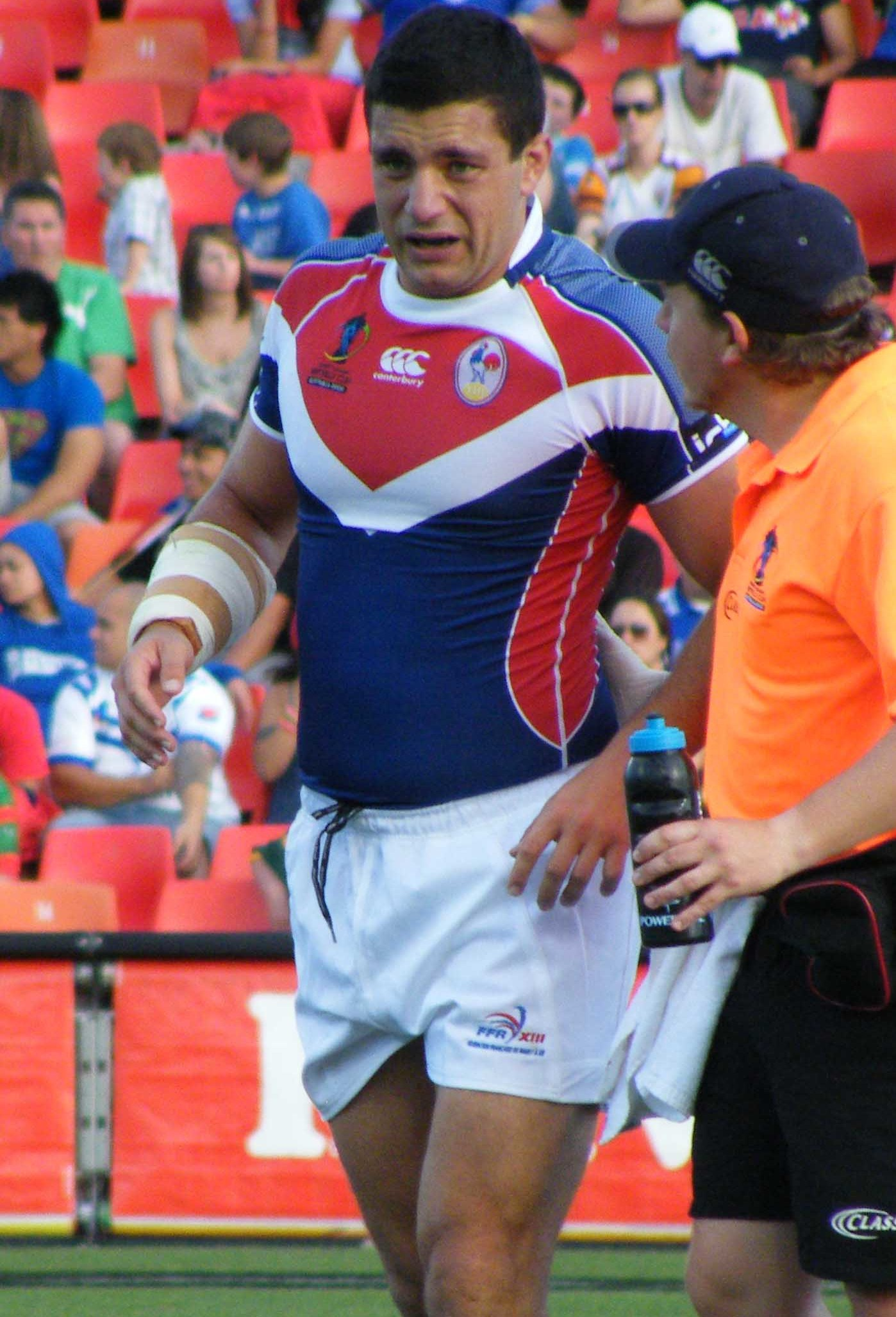

Personal information
- Full name: Sébastien Raguin
- Born: 14 February 1980 (age 46) Toulouse, Midi-Pyrénées, France

Playing information
- Height: 1.89 m (6 ft 2 in)
- Weight: 105 kg (16 st 7 lb)
- Position: Second-row, Centre
Club
Years	Team	Pld	T	G	FG	P
2001–06	Toulouse Olympique	10	3	0	0	12
2007–12	Catalans Dragons	137	29	0	0	116
	Total	147	32	0	0	128
Representative
Years	Team	Pld	T	G	FG	P
2002–13	France	34	6	0	0	24

Coaching information
Club
Years	Team	Gms	W	D	L	W%
	Toulouse Olympique Broncos

Sébastien Raguin (born 14 February 1980) is a French former professional rugby league footballer who played for the Catalans Dragons in the Super League; he played as a second-row or centre. He is the current first team coach for Toulouse Olympique in the RFL League 1.

== Background ==
Raguin was born in Toulouse, France.

== Career ==
Raguin first caught the eye in 2005 playing for Toulouse Olympique during their famous run to the semi-finals of the Challenge Cup. He famously played for them semi-professionally whilst working during the week as a traffic warden in the city of Toulouse.

In 2007 he signed with the Catalans Dragons, and quickly established himself as a key component of the Catalans pack. His 2007 season was punctuated by injury, however he became an ever-present in the Catalans Dragons side during their run to the Super League play-offs in 2008, where he frequently played in the centres striking up a good partnership with Younes Khattabi.

He was named in the France training squad for the 2008 Rugby League World Cup.

He was named in the France squad for the 2008 Rugby League World Cup.
