= Grégory Mounis =

Former France international rugby league footballer

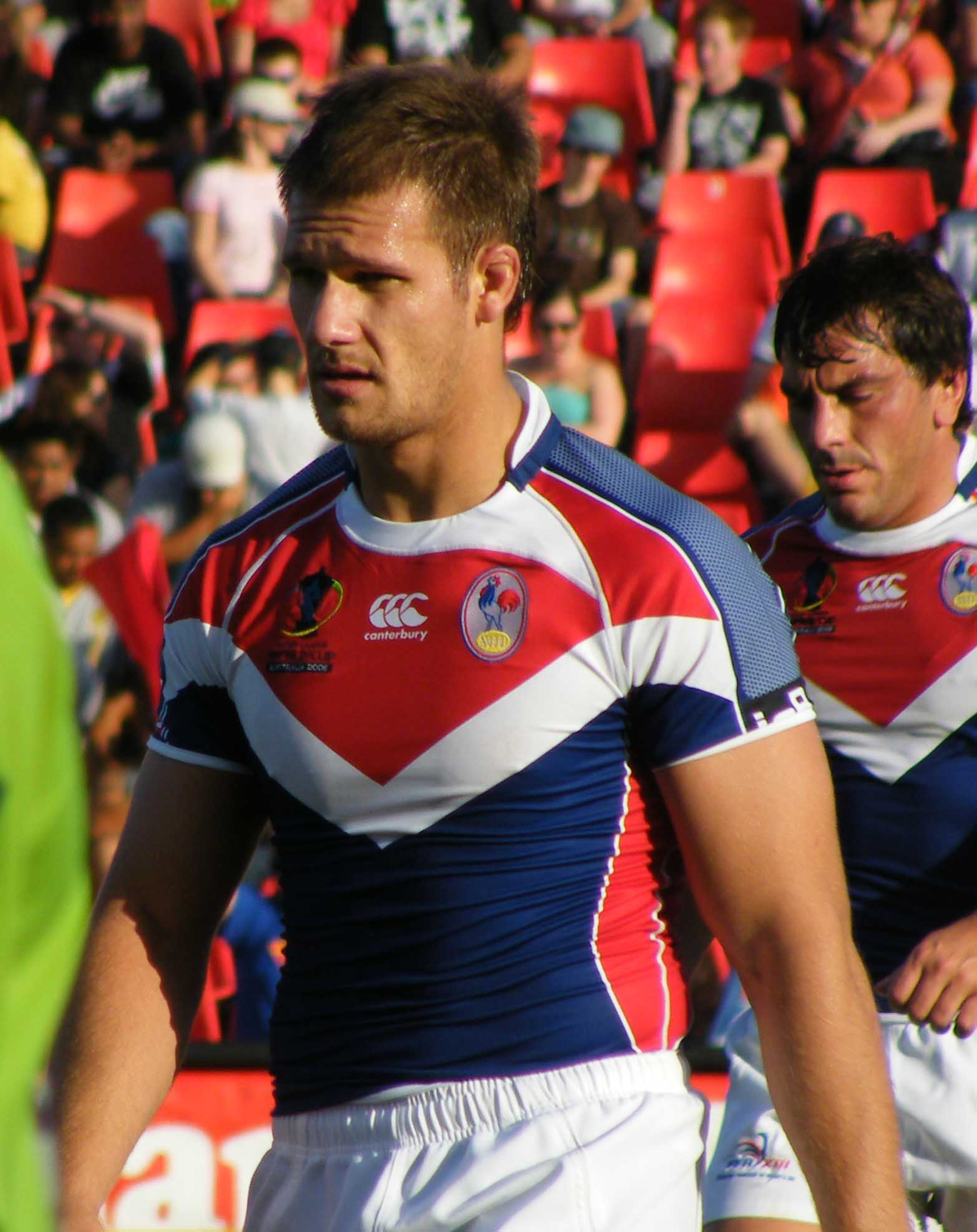

Personal information
- Born: 18 January 1985 (age 41) Perpignan, Pyrénées-Orientales, Occitania, France

Playing information
- Height: 182 cm (6 ft 0 in)
- Weight: 97 kg (15 st 4 lb)
- Position: Loose forward
Club
Years	Team	Pld	T	G	FG	P
2006–16	Catalans Dragons	274	30	20	0	160
Representative
Years	Team	Pld	T	G	FG	P
2004–13	France	14	4	0	0	16

Grégory Mounis (born 18 January 1985 in Perpignan, France) is a French former professional rugby league footballer who played in the 2000s and 2010s. He played for Catalans Dragons in the Super League competition. Equally comfortable at second-row or at loose forward, Mounis became the first French captain of Catalans in 2007 and featured in every Super League season for the club between 2006 and 2016, having made his debut in the club's inaugural Super League match against Wigan Warriors in 2006.

== Playing career ==
An established international, Mounis featured for France in the 2008 Rugby League World Cup and the 2013 Rugby League World Cup.

In 2016 Mounis was named at loose forward in the Dragons' Team of the Decade. He announced his retirement from the sport following the 2016 Super League season.

== Coaching ==
On 19 January 2021 it was announced that Mounis would take up the role of defensive consultant at Palau Broncos for the remainder of the season.
