= 2007 Catalans Dragons season =

- Super League XII Rank: 10th
- Play-off result: Did not qualify
- Challenge Cup: Runners Up
- 2007 record: Wins: 14; draws: 1; losses: 17
- Points scored: For: 735; against: 788

Team information
- Chairman: Bernard Guasch
- Head Coach: Michael Potter
- Captain: Stacey Jones
- Stadium: Stade Gilbert Brutus
- Avg. attendance: 7,706
- High attendance: 9,300 vs. Harlequins RL

Top scorers
- Tries: Thomas Bosc, Adam Mogg & Clint Greenshields (13)
- Goals: Thomas Bosc (68)
- Points: Thomas Bosc (189)
← 2006	List of seasons	2008 →

This article details the Catalans Dragons rugby league football club's 2007 season. This is their 2nd season in the Super League.

== Table ==
Pos	Team	Pld	W	D	L	PF	PA	PD	Pts	Qualification
1	St Helens (L)	27	19	0	8	783	422	+361	38	Semifinal
2	Leeds Rhinos (C)	27	18	1	8	747	487	+260	37	Semifinal
3	Bradford Bulls	27	17	1	9	778	560	+218	33 (Note: Bradford deducted 2 points for salary cap breaches.)	Elimination semifinal
4	Hull F.C.	27	14	2	11	573	553	+20	30	Elimination semifinal
5	Huddersfield Giants	27	13	1	13	638	543	+95	27	Elimination semifinal
6	Wigan Warriors	27	15	1	11	621	527	+94	27 (Note: Wigan deducted 4 points for salary cap breaches.)	Elimination semifinal
7	Warrington Wolves	27	13	0	14	693	736	−43	26	
8	Wakefield Trinity Wildcats	27	11	1	15	596	714	−118	23	
9	Harlequins	27	10	3	14	495	636	−141	23	
10	Catalans Dragons	27	10	1	16	570	685	−115	21	
11	Hull Kingston Rovers	27	10	0	17	491	723	−232	20	
12	Salford City Reds (R)	27	6	1	20	475	874	−399	13	Relegation to National League One

Source: Rugby League Project
Rules for classification: 1) Points; 2) Points difference; 3) Number of points scored;
(C) Champions; (L) League Leaders' Shield Winners; (R) Relegated

== Milestones ==
- Round 1: Clint Greenshields, Adam Mogg, Vincent Duport, Dimitri Pelo, Casey McGuire, Aaron Gorrell, Sébastien Raguin, Jason Croker and David Ferriol made their debuts for the Dragons.
- Round 1: Vincent Duport and Adam Mogg scored their 1st try for the Dragons.
- Round 1: Aaron Gorrell kicked his 1st goal for the Dragons.
- Round 3: Casey McGuire and Dimitri Pelo scored their 1st try for the Dragons.
- Round 5: Jason Croker scored his 1st try for the Dragons.
- Round 6: Clint Greenshields scored his 1st try for the Dragons.
- Round 6: Stacey Jones kicked his 1st drop-goal for the Dragons.
- Round 7: Luke Quigley made his debut for the Dragons.
- Round 7: David Ferriol scored his 1st try for the Dragons.
- Round 7: Jason Croker kicked his 1st drop-goal for the Dragons.
- CCR4: Andrew Bentley and Kane Bentley made their debut for the Dragons.
- CCR4: Cyrille Gossard, Andrew Bentley and Younes Khattabi scored their 1st try for the Dragons.
- Round 8: Kane Bentley scored his 1st try for the Dragons.
- Round 8: Thomas Bosc reached 100 points for the Dragons.
- Round 10: Julien Touxagas scored his 1st try for the Dragons.
- Round 11: Olivier Charles made his debut for the Dragons.
- Round 11: Olivier Charles scored his 1st try for the Dragons.
- Round 14: Justin Murphy scored his 2nd hat-trick for the Dragons.
- CCQF: Thomas Bosc and Jérôme Guisset kicked their 1st drop-goal for the Dragons.
- Round 18: Jérôme Guisset made his 50th appearance for the Dragons.
- Round 19: Sébastien Raguin scored his 1st try for the Dragons.
- Round 19: Thomas Bosc reached 200 points for the Dragons.
- Round 20: Alex Chan made his 50th appearance for the Dragons.
- Round 21: Luke Quigley scored his 1st try for the Dragons.
- CCSF: Stacey Jones reached 100 points for the Dragons.
- Round 23: John Wilson made his 50th appearance for the Dragons.
- Round 26: Cyril Stacul made his debut for the Dragons.
- Round 26: Grégory Mounis made his 50th appearance for the Dragons.
- Round 27: Cyril Stacul scored his 1st try for the Dragons.

== Fixtures and results ==
LEGEND
Win
Draw
Loss

2007 Super League

Date	Competition	Rnd	Vrs	H/A	Venue	Result	Score	Tries	Goals	Att	Report
11 February 2007	Super League XII	1	Hull F.C.	A	KC Stadium	D	10-10	Duport, Mogg	Gorrell 1/2	12,673	Report
17 February 2007	Super League XII	2	Wigan Warriors	H	Stade Gilbert Brutus	L	16-18	Chan, Murphy	Gorrell 4/5	7,052	Report
24 February 2007	Super League XII	3	Leeds Rhinos	H	Stade Gilbert Brutus	W	30-22	Bosc, Chan, Duport, McGuire, Pelo	Gorrell 5/6	7,630	Report
3 March 2007	Super League XII	4	Salford City Reds	A	The Willows	L	0-10	-	-	4,085	Report
11 March 2007	Super League XII	5	Wakefield Trinity Wildcats	A	Belle Vue	L	20-40	Murphy (2), Croker	Bosc 4/4, Jones 0/1	5,332	Report
17 March 2007	Super League XII	6	Huddersfield Giants	H	Stade Gilbert Brutus	W	23-22	Bosc, Greenshields, Mogg, Teixido	Bosc 3/4, Jones 1 DG	8,300	Report
25 March 2007	Super League XII	7	Bradford Bulls	A	Odsal Stadium	W	29-22	Bosc (2), Ferriol, Greenshields, Wilson	Bosc 4/6, Croker 1 DG	11,298	Report
6 April 2007	Super League XII	8	Hull Kingston Rovers	A	Craven Park	W	34-20	K.Bentley, Croker, Duport, Greenshields, Jones, Pelo	Bosc 5/6	6,701	Report
9 April 2007	Super League XII	9	Harlequins RL	H	Stade Gilbert Brutus	L	16-38	Bosc, Fellous, Pelo	Bosc 2/3	9,300	Report
13 April 2007	Super League XII	10	St Helens R.F.C.	A	Knowsley Road	L	10-53	Pelo, Touxagas	Bosc 1/2	7,918	Report
21 April 2007	Super League XII	11	Warrington Wolves	H	Stade Gilbert Brutus	W	27-16	Bosc, Chan, Charles, McGuire	Bosc 5/5, Jones 1 DG	9,050	Report
27 April 2007	Super League XII	12	Leeds Rhinos	A	Headingley Stadium	L	8-54	Charles, Mogg	Bosc 0/2	15,581	Report
5 May 2007	Magic Weekend	13	Harlequins RL	N	Millennium Stadium	L	28-32	Jones (2), A.Bentley, Greenshields, Wilson	Bosc 4/5	32,384	Report
19 May 2007	Super League XII	14	Salford City Reds	H	Stade Gilbert Brutus	W	66-6	Murphy (3), Bosc (2), Mogg (2), McGuire (2), Gossard, Greenshields, Guisset	Bosc 9/13	8,820	Report
27 May 2007	Super League XII	15	Wakefield Trinity Wildcats	A	Belle Vue	L	12-18	Wilson (2)	Bosc 2/2	4,023	Report
2 June 2007	Super League XII	16	Bradford Bulls	H	Stade Gilbert Brutus	L	20-28	Bosc, Gossard, McGuire, Wilson	Bosc 2/4	7,555	Report
15 June 2007	Super League XII	17	Wigan Warriors	A	JJB Stadium	L	0-30	-	-	12,641	Report
30 June 2007	Super League XII	18	Warrington Wolves	H	Stade Gilbert Brutus	W	24-22	Croker, Ferriol, Khattabi, McGuire, Wilson	Bosc 2/5	8,850	Report
7 July 2007	Super League XII	19	Harlequins RL	A	Twickenham Stoop	L	22-30	Bosc, Greenshields, McGuire, Raguin	Bosc 3/4	2,546	Report
14 July 2007	Super League XII	20	Hull Kingston Rovers	H	Stade Gilbert Brutus	L	20-22	Khattabi (2), Greenshields, Jones	Bosc 2/4	7,830	Report
21 July 2007	Super League XII	21	Hull F.C.	H	Stade Gilbert Brutus	L	18-34	Bosc, Ferriol, Mogg, Quigley	Bosc 1/4	7,560	Report
5 August 2007	Super League XII	22	Huddersfield Giants	A	Galpharm Stadium	L	22-42	Chan, Croker, Khattabi, Mogg	Jones 3/4	4,319	Report
11 August 2007	Super League XII	23	St Helens R.F.C.	H	Stade Gilbert Brutus	W	21-0	Croker, Greenshields, Khattabi, Murphy	Jones 2/4, Jones 1 DG	8,655	Report
19 August 2007	Super League XII	24	Warrington Wolves	A	Halliwell Jones Stadium	L	18-22	Greenshields, Jones, Murphy	Jones 3/3	8,125	Report
1 September 2007	Super League XII	25	Wakefield Trinity Wildcats	H	Stade Gilbert Brutus	W	38-20	Casty, Croker, Gossard, Greenshields, Mogg, Murphy	Jones 7/7	7,325	Report
9 September 2007	Super League XII	26	Bradford Bulls	A	Odsal Stadium	L	8-40	Fellous	Jones 2/2	9,350	Report
15 September 2007	Super League XII	27	Harlequins RL	H	Stade Gilbert Brutus	W	30-14	Greenshields (2), Wilson (2), Stacul	Jones 5/5	8,420	Report

== Player appearances ==
- Super League only

FB=Fullback	C=Centre	W=Winger	SO=Stand-off	SH=Scrum half	PR=Prop	H=Hooker	SR=Second Row	L=Loose forward	B=Bench

No	Player	1	2	3	4	5	6	7	8	9	10	11	12	13	14	15	16	17	18	19	20	21	22	23	24	25	26	27
1	Clint Greenshields	FB	FB	FB	FB	FB	FB	FB	FB	FB	FB	FB	FB	FB	FB	FB	FB	FB	FB	FB	FB	FB	FB	FB	FB	FB	FB	FB
2	Justin Murphy	W	W	W	W	W								W	W	W	W	W						W	W	W	W	W
3	John Wilson	SH	SH		C			C			C	C	C	C	C	C	C	C	C	C	C	C	C	C	C			C
4	Adam Mogg	C	C	C	C	C	C	C	C	C	C	C	C	C	C	C	C	C	C	C	C	C	C	SO	SO	SO	x	SO
5	Dimitri Pelo	W	W	W	W	W	W	W	W	W	W	W	W															
6	Casey McGuire	SO	SO	SH	SH	SO	SO	SO	SO	SO	SO	B	B	B	SO	SO	SO	SO	SO	SO	SO	SO	SO					
7	Stacey Jones					SH	SH	SH	SH	SH	SH	SH	SH	SH	SH	SH	SH	SH	SH	SH	SH	SH	SH	SH	SH	SH	SH	SH
8	David Ferriol	B	B	B	B	P	P	B	B	B	B	B	B	B	B		B	B	B			B	B	B	P	P	P	x
9	David Berthezène				B	x	x	x	x	x	x	x	x	x	x	x	x	x	x	x	x	x	x	x	x	x	x	x
10	Jérôme Guisset	P	P	B	P	B	B	P	P	P	P	P	P	B	P	P	P	P	P	P	P	P	P	P		x	x	B
11	Sébastien Raguin	SR		SR	SR	SR	B	B											B	B	B	SR	SR	C	C	C	C	C
12	Jason Croker	SR	SR	SR	SR	SR	SR	SR	L	SR	SR	SR							SR	SR	SR	SR	SR	SR	SR	SR	SO	SR
13	Grégory Mounis	L	L	L	L	L	L	L							L	L	L	L	L	L	L	L	L	L	L	B	SR	B
14	Thomas Bosc	x	x	SO	SO	B	W	W	W	W	W	SO	SO	SO	W	W	W	W	W	W	W	W						
15	Mathieu Griffi	x	x	x	x	x	B	B	x	B	B	x	x	x	B	B	B	B	B	B	B	B	B			B	B	B
16	Lionel Teixido	B	B	B	H	H	H	H	H	H	H			B	x	B	B	x	x	x	x	x	x	x	x	B	B	B
17	Cyrille Gossard	B	B	B	B	B	SR	SR	SR				SR	L	SR	SR	SR	SR	SR	SR	SR	B	B	SR	SR	SR	SR	SR
18	Vincent Duport	C	C	C	x	C	C	x	C	C				W	x	x	x	x	x	x	B	B	W	x	x	C	C	x
19	Alex Chan	P	SR	P	B	P	P	P	P	P	P	P	P	P	P	P	P	P	P	P	P	P	P	P	P	P	x	P
20	Adel Fellous	B	P	P	P	B	B			B	B									B	B				B	x	B	x
21	Julien Touxagas	x	x	x	x	x	x	x	B	L	L	L	L	SR	SR	SR	SR	SR	B	B	x	x	B	B	B	x	B	x
22	Jamal Fakir														B	B												
23	Aaron Gorrell	H	H	H																								
24	Rémi Casty	x	B	x	x	x	x	x	B	x	x	B	B	P	x	x	x	x	x	x	x	x	x	B	B	B	P	P
25	Younes Khattabi	x	x	x	x	x	x	x	x	x	x	B	B	x	x	x	x	B	W	W	W	W	W	W	W	W	x	x
26	Luke Quigley	x	x	x	x	x	x	B					H	H	H	H	H	H	H	H	H	H	H	H	H	H	H	H
27	Andrew Bentley	x	x	x	x	x	x	x	SR	SR	SR	SR	SR	SR	B	B	B	B								L	L	L
28	Kane Bentley	x	x	x	x	x	x	x	B	B	B	H												B	B	x	x	x
29	Olivier Charles	x	x	x	x	x	x	x	x	x	x	W	W	x	x	x	x	x	x	x	x	x	x	x	x	x	x	x
30	Cyril Stacul	x	x	x	x	x	x	x	x	x	x	x	x	x	x	x	x	x	x	x	x	x	x	x	x	x	W	W

= Injured

= Suspended

== Challenge Cup ==
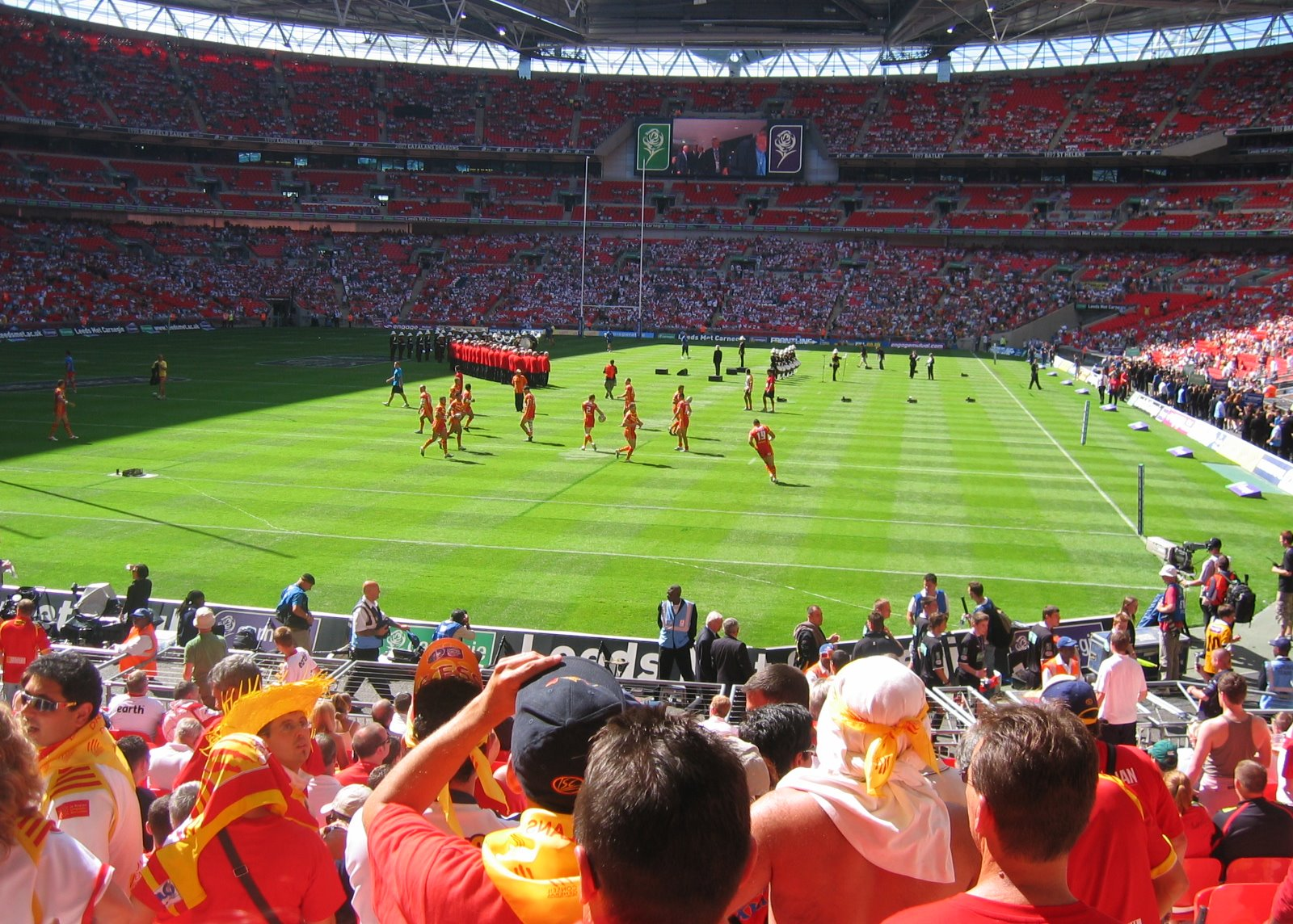
Catalans Dragons fans at Wembley ahead of the 2007 Challenge Cup Final

LEGEND
Win
Draw
Loss

Date	Competition	Rnd	Vrs	H/A	Venue	Result	Score	Tries	Goals	Att	TV	Report
29 March 2007	Cup	4th	Featherstone Rovers	H	Stade Gilbert Brutus	W	70-12	Gossard (2), Mogg (2), A.Bentley, Bosc, Casty, Chan, Duport, Fellous, Ferriol, Khattabi	Bosc 11/12	1,545	-	Report
13 May 2007	Cup	5th	Whitehaven R.L.F.C.	A	Recreation Ground	W	24-14	K.Bentley, Bosc, Duport, Touxagas	Bosc 4/4	3,008	-	Report
10 June 2007	Cup	QF	Hull F.C.	A	KC Stadium	W	26-23	Mogg (2), Greenshields, Wilson	Bosc 4/5, Bosc 1 DG, Guisset 1 DG	7,441	-	Report
29 July 2007	Cup	SF	Wigan Warriors	N	Halliwell Jones Stadium	W	37-24	Duport (2), Croker, McGuire, Mogg, Wilson	Jones 6/7, Jones 1 DG	10,218	BBC Sport	Report
25 August 2007	Cup	Final	St Helens R.F.C.	N	Wembley Stadium	L	8-30	Khattabi, Murphy	Jones 0/2	84,241	BBC Sport	Report

2007 Challenge Cup Final
Catalans Dragons	positions	St Helens R.F.C.
1. Clint Greenshields	Fullback	1. Paul Wellens
2. Justin Murphy	Winger	2. Ade Gardner
3. John Wilson	Centre	3. Matt Gidley
11. Sébastien Raguin	Centre	4. Willie Talau
25. Younes Khattabi	Winger	5. Francis Meli
4. Adam Mogg	Stand off	6. Leon Pryce
7. Stacey Jones (c)	Scrum half	7. Sean Long
10. Jérôme Guisset	Prop	8. Nick Fozzard
26. Luke Quigley	Hooker	9. Kieron Cunningham (c)
19. Alex Chan	Prop	10. Jason Cayless
12. Jason Croker	2nd Row	11. Lee Gilmour
17. Cyrille Gossard	2nd Row	15. Mike Bennett
13. Grégory Mounis	Loose forward	12. Jon Wilkin
8. David Ferriol	Interchange	14. James Roby
18. Vincent Duport	Interchange	17. James Graham
24. Rémi Casty	Interchange	22. Paul Clough
27. Andrew Bentley	Interchange	23. Maurie Fa'asavalu
Mick Potter	Coach	Daniel Anderson

== Player appearances ==
- Challenge Cup games only

FB=Fullback	C=Centre	W=Winger	SO=Stand Off	SH=Scrum half	P=Prop	H=Hooker	SR=Second Row	L=Loose forward	B=Bench

No	Player	4	5	QF	SF	F
1	Clint Greenshields	x	FB	FB	FB	FB
2	Justin Murphy		W	W		W
3	John Wilson	SO	C	C	C	C
4	Adam Mogg	C	C	C	C	SO
5	Dimitri Pelo	W				
6	Casey McGuire	x	B	x	SO	
7	Stacey Jones	SH	SH	SH	SH	SH
8	David Ferriol	P	B	B	B	B
9	David Berthezène	x	x	x	x	x
10	Jérôme Guisset	L	P	P	P	P
11	Sébastien Raguin	x			SR	C
12	Jason Croker	x			SR	SR
13	Grégory Mounis	x	L		L	L
14	Thomas Bosc	FB	SO	SO		
15	Mathieu Griffi	x	B	P	B	x
16	Lionel Teixido	H	B	B	x	x
17	Cyrille Gossard	SR	SR	SR	B	SR
18	Vincent Duport	C	W	x	W	B
19	Alex Chan	B	P	L	P	P
20	Adel Fellous	B			x	x
21	Julien Touxagas	B	SR	SR	B	x
22	Jamal Fakir					
23	Aaron Gorrell					
24	Rémi Casty	P	x	x	x	B
25	Younes Khattabi	W	x	W	W	W
26	Luke Quigley	x		H	H	H
27	Andrew Bentley	SR		B		
28	Kane Bentley	B	H	B		B

== Squad statistics ==
- Appearances and Points include (Super League, Challenge Cup and Play-offs) as of 15 September 2007.

No	Player	Position	Age	Previous club	Apps	Tries	Goals	DG	Points
1	Clint Greenshields	Fullback	25	St George Illawarra Dragons	31	13	0	0	52
2	Justin Murphy	Wing	28	Widnes Vikings	18	10	0	0	40
3	John Wilson	Centre	29	Wests Tigers	25	10	0	0	40
4	Adam Mogg	Centre	30	Canberra Raiders	31	13	0	0	52
5	Dimitri Pelo	Wing	22	Unattached	13	4	0	0	16
6	Casey McGuire	Stand off	27	Brisbane Broncos	24	8	0	0	32
7	Stacey Jones	Scrum half	31	New Zealand Warriors	28	5	28	4	80
8	David Ferriol	Prop	28	Limoux Grizzlies	28	4	0	0	16
9	David Berthezène	Hooker	26	Catalans Dragons Academy	1	0	0	0	0
10	Jérôme Guisset	Prop	29	Wigan Warriors	29	1	0	1	5
11	Sébastien Raguin	Second row	28	Toulouse Olympique	18	1	0	0	4
12	Jason Croker	Second row	34	Canberra Raiders	23	7	0	1	29
13	Grégory Mounis	Loose forward	22	Catalans Dragons Academy	24	0	0	0	0
14	Thomas Bosc	Stand off	24	Catalans Dragons Academy	22	13	68	1	189
15	Mathieu Griffi	Prop	24	Catalans Dragons Academy	19	0	0	0	0
16	Lionel Teixido	Hooker	28	Catalans Dragons Academy	19	1	0	0	4
17	Cyrille Gossard	Second row	25	Catalans Dragons Academy	29	5	0	0	20
18	Vincent Duport	Wing	19	Catalans Dragons Academy	17	7	0	0	28
19	Alex Chan	Prop	32	Melbourne Storm	31	5	0	0	20
20	Adel Fellous	Prop	29	Catalans Dragons Academy	13	3	0	0	12
21	Julien Touxagas	Second row	23	Catalans Dragons Academy	20	2	0	0	8
22	Jamal Fakir	Prop	25	Villeneuve Leopards	2	0	0	0	0
23	Aaron Gorrell	Hooker	26	St George Illawarra Dragons	3	0	10	0	20
24	Rémi Casty	Prop	22	Catalans Dragons Academy	12	2	0	0	8
25	Younes Khattabi	Wing	23	Catalans Dragons Academy	15	7	0	0	28
26	Luke Quigley	Hooker	26	Newcastle Knights	20	1	0	0	4
27	Andrew Bentley	Second row	22	Catalans Dragons Academy	15	2	0	0	8
28	Kane Bentley	Hooker	20	Catalans Dragons Academy	10	2	0	0	8
29	Olivier Charles	Wing	28	Villeneuve Leopards	2	2	0	0	8
30	Cyril Stacul	Wing	22	Catalans Dragons Academy	2	1	0	0	4

== Transfers ==
=== In ===
	Name	Position	Signed from	Date
(Australia)	Clint Greenshields	Fullback	St George Illawarra Dragons	June 2006
(Australia)	Casey McGuire	Stand off	Brisbane Broncos	June 2006
(Australia)	Adam Mogg	Centre	Canberra Raiders	July 2006
(France)	David Ferriol	Prop	Limoux Grizzlies	October 2006
(France)	Dimitri Pelo	Wing	Unattached	October 2006
(Australia)	Jason Croker	Second row	Canberra Raiders	August 2006
(Australia)	Aaron Gorrell	Hooker	St George Illawarra Dragons	October 2006
(France)	Sébastien Raguin	Second row	Toulouse Olympique	October 2006
(Australia)	Luke Quigley	Hooker	Newcastle Knights	March 2007

=== Out ===
	Name	Position	Club Signed	Date
(Australia)	Ian Hindmarsh	Second row	Parramatta Eels	August 2006
(Australia)	Chris Beattie	Prop	Sydney Roosters	September 2006
(France)	Julien Rinaldi	Hooker	Harlequins RL	September 2006
(France)	Pascal Jampy	Second row	Retired	September 2006
(France)	Renaud Guigue	Fullback	Released	September 2006
(France)	Bruno Verges	Wing	Released	September 2006
(France)	Frédéric Zitter	Wing	Released	September 2006
(France)	Laurent Frayssinous	Stand off	Retired	September 2006
(France)	Teddy Sadaoui	Centre	AS Carcassonne	November 2006
(Australia)	Sean Rudder	Stand off	Retired	November 2006
(Australia)	Mark Hughes	Centre	Retired	November 2006
(France)	Aurélien Cologni	Loose forward	Crusaders RL	November 2006
(France)	Sébastien Martins	Second row	Leigh Centurions (Loan)	November 2006
(France)	David Berthezène	Hooker	Salford City Reds	March 2007
(France)	Olivier Charles	Wing	Released	June 2007
