= 2008 Catalans Dragons season =

- Super League XIII Rank: 3rd
- Play-off result: Elimination Semi Final
- Challenge Cup: 5th Round
- 2008 record: Wins: 18; draws: 2; losses: 11
- Points scored: For: 804; against: 741

Team information
- Chairman: Bernard Guasch
- Head Coach: Michael Potter
- Captain: Casey McGuire
- Stadium: Stade Gilbert Brutus
- Avg. attendance: 8,487
- High attendance: 9,985 vs. Wigan Warriors

Top scorers
- Tries: Clint Greenshields (18)
- Goals: Thomas Bosc (123)
- Points: Thomas Bosc (275)
← 2007	List of seasons	2009 →

This article details the Catalans Dragons rugby league football club's 2008 season. This is their 3rd season in the Super League.

== Table ==
Super League XIII
Pos	Team	Pld	W	D	L	PF	PA	PD	Pts	Qualification
1	St. Helens (L)	27	21	1	5	940	457	+483	43	Semi-final
2	Leeds Rhinos (C)	27	21	0	6	863	413	+450	42	Semi-final
3	Catalans Dragons	27	16	2	9	694	625	+69	34	Elimination semi-finals
4	Wigan Warriors	27	13	3	11	648	698	−50	29	Elimination semi-finals
5	Bradford Bulls	27	14	0	13	705	625	+80	28	Elimination semi-finals
6	Warrington Wolves	27	14	0	13	690	713	−23	28	Elimination semi-finals
7	Hull Kingston Rovers	27	11	1	15	564	713	−149	23	
8	Wakefield Trinity Wildcats	27	11	0	16	574	760	−186	22	
9	Harlequins	27	11	0	16	569	763	−194	22	
10	Huddersfield Giants	27	10	1	16	638	681	−43	21	
11	Hull F.C.	27	8	1	18	538	699	−161	17	
12	Castleford Tigers	27	7	1	19	593	869	−276	15	

Source: superleague.co.uk
Rules for classification: 1st on competition points; 2nd on match points difference.
Competition points: for win = 2; for draw = 1; for loss = 0.
(C) Champions; (L) League Leaders' Shield Winners

== Milestones ==
- Round 1: Dane Carlaw and Jean-Philippe Baile made their debuts for the Dragons.
- Round 2: Aaron Gorrell scored his 1st try for the Dragons.
- Round 5: Justin Murphy made his 50th appearance for the Dragons.
- Round 7: Dane Carlaw scored his 1st try for the Dragons.
- Round 9: Thomas Bosc kicked his 100th goal for the Dragons.
- Round 10: Thomas Bosc reached 300 points for the Dragons.
- CCR4: Olivier Elima and Florian Quintilla made their debuts for the Dragons.
- Round 14: Thomas Bosc made his 50th appearance for the Dragons.
- Round 17: Clint Greenshields scored his 1st hat-trick for the Dragons.
- Round 17: Clint Greenshields scored his 25th try and reached 100 points for the Dragons.
- Round 17: Olivier Elima scored his 1st try for the Dragons.
- Round 18: Clint Greenshields made his 50th appearance for the Dragons.
- Round 18: Thomas Bosc reached 400 points for the Dragons.
- Round 20: Adam Mogg made his 50th appearance for the Dragons.
- Round 25: Jamal Fakir made his 50th appearance for the Dragons.
- Round 26: Jean-Philippe Baile scored his 1st try for the Dragons.
- Round 26: Thomas Bosc scored his 25th try for the Dragons.
- EPO: Justin Murphy scored his 1st four-try haul and his 3rd hat-trick for the Dragons.
- EPO: Justin Murphy scored his 50th try and reached 200 points for the Dragons.
- ESF: John Wilson scored his 25th try and reached 100 points for the Dragons.

== Fixtures and results ==
LEGEND
Win
Draw
Loss

2008 Super League

Date	Competition	Rnd	Vrs	H/A	Venue	Result	Score	Tries	Goals	Att	Report
9 February 2008	Super League XIII	1	Castleford Tigers	A	Wheldon Road	W	21-14	Bosc, Croker, Mounis	Bosc 4/4, Bosc 1 DG	7,060	Report
16 February 2008	Super League XIII	2	Hull Kingston Rovers	H	Stade Gilbert Brutus	L	20-24	Gorrell, Greenshields, Wilson	Bosc 4/5	8,350	Report
22 February 2008	Super League XIII	3	Leeds Rhinos	A	Headingley Stadium	L	6-34	Pelo	Bosc 1/1	14,083	Report
2 March 2008	Super League XIII	4	Warrington Wolves	A	Halliwell Jones Stadium	L	18-38	Greenshields, Murphy, Raguin	Bosc 3/3	9,060	Report
8 March 2008	Super League XIII	5	Bradford Bulls	H	Stade Gilbert Brutus	L	18-20	Bosc, Chan, Greenshields	Bosc 3/3	7,485	Report
15 March 2008	Super League XIII	6	St Helens R.F.C.	H	Stade Gilbert Brutus	W	24-10	Pelo (2), Casty, Chan	Bosc 4/5	7,828	Report
21 March 2008	Super League XIII	7	Harlequins RL	A	Twickenham Stoop	W	24-22	Carlaw, Gorrell, Mounis, Pelo	Bosc 4/4	3,854	Report
24 March 2008	Super League XIII	8	Wakefield Trinity Wildcats	H	Stade Gilbert Brutus	W	28-20	Carlaw, Chan, Ferriol, Greenshields, Stacul	Bosc 4/5	8,120	Report
29 March 2008	Super League XIII	9	Hull F.C.	H	Stade Gilbert Brutus	D	28-28	Bosc, Duport, Mounis, Pelo	Bosc 6/6	8,450	Report
4 April 2008	Super League XIII	10	Huddersfield Giants	A	Galpharm Stadium	W	20-16	Bosc, Fakir, Ferriol	Bosc 4/5	4,071	Report
11 April 2008	Super League XIII	11	Wigan Warriors	A	JJB Stadium	W	26-24	Carlaw, Greenshields, Guisset, Murphy	Bosc 5/6	13,044	Report
26 April 2008	Super League XIII	12	Castleford Tigers	H	Stade Gilbert Brutus	W	38-30	Gorrell, Greenshields, Guisset, Mounis, Murphy, Pelo, Raguin	Bosc 5/8	8,745	Report
4 May 2008	Magic Weekend	13	Harlequins RL	N	Millennium Stadium	W	18-16	Croker, Murphy, Touxagas	Bosc 3/3	15,000	Report
17 May 2008	Super League XIII	14	St Helens R.F.C.	A	Knowsley Road	L	10-28	Greenshields, Mogg	Bosc 1/2	8,550	Report
24 May 2008	Super League XIII	15	Huddersfield Giants	H	Stade Gilbert Brutus	W	48-0	Greenshields (2), Casty, Fakir, Mounis, Murphy, Pelo, Wilson	Bosc 8/9	7,785	Report
8 June 2008	Super League XIII	16	Bradford Bulls	A	Odsal Stadium	W	24-16	McGuire, Murphy, Raguin, Wilson	Bosc 4/6	8,346	Report
14 June 2008	Super League XIII	17	Wigan Warriors	H	Stade Gilbert Brutus	W	45-38	Greenshields (3), Elima, Mogg, Raguin, Wilson	Bosc 8/8, Mogg 1 DG	9,125	Report
21 June 2008	Super League XIII	18	Warrington Wolves	H	Stade Gilbert Brutus	W	52-14	Murphy (2), Bosc, Elima, Khattabi, McGuire, Mogg, Raguin, Wilson	Bosc 8/10	9,040	Report
1 July 2008	Super League XIII	19	Wakefield Trinity Wildcats	A	Belle Vue	W	30-14	Khattabi (2), McGuire (2), Raguin	Bosc 5/7	5,479	Report
6 July 2008	Super League XIII	20	Hull F.C.	A	KC Stadium	W	30-18	Elima, Fakir, Greenshields, Mounis, Murphy	Bosc 5/5	11,006	Report
12 July 2008	Super League XIII	21	Harlequins RL	H	Stade Gilbert Brutus	W	32-26	Greenshields (2), Chan, Elima, McGuire	Bosc 6/6	6,225	Report
19 July 2008	Super League XIII	22	Leeds Rhinos	H	Stade Gilbert Brutus	L	24-37	Elima (2), Raguin, Stacul	Bosc 4/4	9,880	Report
1 August 2008	Super League XIII	23	Hull Kingston Rovers	A	Craven Park	L	16-30	Duport, Khattabi, Mounis	Bosc 2/3	8,074	Report
9 August 2008	Super League XIII	24	Wigan Warriors	H	Stade Gilbert Brutus	D	16-16	Gorrell, Greenshields, Wilson	Bosc 2/4	9,535	Report
16 August 2008	Super League XIII	25	Huddersfield Giants	A	Galpharm Stadium	W	22-20	Mogg (2), Gorrell, Murphy	Bosc 3/5	12,127	Report
23 August 2008	Super League XIII	26	Wakefield Trinity Wildcats	H	Stade Gilbert Brutus	L	32-38	Baile, Bosc, Elima, Gorrell, Raguin, Touxagas	Bosc 4/6	8,320	Report
7 September 2008	Super League XIII	27	Harlequins RL	A	Twickenham Stoop	L	24-34	Pelo (2), McGuire, Mogg	Gorrell 4/5	2,447	Report

Super League Play-offs

Date	Competition	Rnd	Vrs	H/A	Venue	Result	Score	Tries	Goals	Att	Report
13 September 2008	Super League XIII	EPO	Warrington Wolves	H	Stade Gilbert Brutus	W	46-8	Murphy (4), Bosc, Greenshields, McGuire, Mounis, Pelo	Bosc 5/9	8,442	Report
20 September 2008	Super League XIII	ESF	Wigan Warriors	H	Stade Gilbert Brutus	L	26-50	Pelo (2), Elima, Murphy, Wilson	Bosc 3/5	9,985	Report

== Player appearances ==
- Super League only

FB=Fullback	C=Centre	W=Winger	SO=Stand-off	SH=Scrum half	PR=Prop	H=Hooker	SR=Second Row	L=Loose forward	B=Bench

No	Player	1	2	3	4	5	6	7	8	9	10	11	12	13	14	15	16	17	18	19	20	21	22	23	24	25	26	27	EPO	ESF
1	Clint Greenshields	FB	FB	FB	FB	FB	FB	FB	FB	FB	FB	FB	FB	FB	FB	FB	FB	FB	FB	FB	FB	FB	FB	FB	FB	FB	FB	FB	FB	FB
2	Justin Murphy				W	W					W	W	W	W		W	W		W	W	W	W				W	W	x	W	W
3	John Wilson	C	C	C	C	C	C	SO	C	SO					C	C	C	C	C	C	C	C	C	W	C	C	x	C	C	C
4	Adam Mogg		C	C	SO	SO	SO	x	SO		SO	SO	C	C	C	SO	SO	SO	SO	SO	SO	SO	Red card	C	SO	SO	SO	SO	SO	SO
5	Dimitri Pelo		W	W	W	W	W	W	W	W	W	W	W	W	W	W	W	W					W		W	W	W	W	W	W
6	Thomas Bosc	SO	SO	SO	SH	SH	SH	SH	SH	SH	SH	SH	SO	SO	SO	SH	SH	SH	SH	SH	SH	SH	SO	SO	SH	SH	SH	x	SH	SH
7	Casey McGuire	SH	SH	SH								B	SH	SH	SH	H	H	H	H	H	H	H	SH	SH				SH	H	H
8	David Ferriol	P	P	P			B	P	P		B	B	x	B	P					B	B				B	B	x	x	x	x
9	Aaron Gorrell	H	H	H	H	H	H	H	H	H	H	H	H	H	H								H	H	H	H	H	H		
10	Jérôme Guisset	B	P	P	P	P	P			P	P	P	P	P	B	P	P	P				B	B	B	B	P	P	P	B	B
11	Sébastien Raguin	B	B	L	SR	SR	SR	SR	SR	SR	C	C	C	C	SR	C	C	C	C	C	C	C	C	C	C	C	C	C	C	C
12	Jason Croker	SR			SR	SR	SR	SR	SR	SR	SR	SR	SR	SR	SR	SR	SR	SR	SR			SR	SR	SR				SR	SR	SR
13	Grégory Mounis	B	B	B	L	B	L	L	L	B	B	B	SR	L	L	SR	SR	SR	L	SR	SR	SR	SR	SR	SR	SR	x	SR	SR	
14	Dane Carlaw	L	SR	SR				B	B	L	L	L	L	SR	B	L	L	L	SR	L	L	L	L	L	L	L	SR	L	L	L
15	Mathieu Griffi	x	B	B	x	x	x	x	x	x	x	x	x	x	x	x	x	x	x	x	x	x	x	x	x	x	B	x	x	x
16	Olivier Elima	x	x	x	x	x	x	x	x	x	x	x	x	x	x	B	B	B	B	P	P	P	P	P	P	P	P	P	P	P
17	Cyrille Gossard	SR	SR	x	B	L	x	x	x	x	x	x	x	x	x	x	x	x	x	x	x	x	x	x	x	x	x	x	x	x
18	Vincent Duport	x	x	x	x	x	x	C	C	C	x	x	B	x	x	B	B	B	B	B	x	x	x	B	B	B	B	x	x	B
19	Alex Chan	P	L	SR	P	P	P	P	P	P	P	P	P	P	P	P	P	P	P	P	P	P	P	P		B	x	B	P	P
20	Kane Bentley	x	x	x	x	x	x	x	x	x	x	x	x	x	x	x	x	x	x	x	x	x	x	x	x	x	x	x	x	x
21	Andrew Bentley	x	x	x	x	x	x	x	x	x	x	x	B	B	x	x	x	x	B	x	x	x	x	x	x	x	B	x	x	x
22	Jamal Fakir	x	x	x	x	B	B	B	B	B	SR	SR	x	x	B	B	B	B	P	SR	SR				SR	SR	x	B	B	SR
23	Cyril Stacul	W	W	W	C	C	C	C	W	W	x	C	x	x	x	x	x	W	x	x	x	x	W	x	x	x	x	W	x	x
24	Rémi Casty	B	B	B	B	B	B	B	B	B	B	B	B	x	B	B	B	B	B	B	B	B	B	B	P		x	B	B	B
25	Younes Khattabi	W	x	x	x	B	W	W	x	C	C	x	x	x	W	x	x	x	W	W	W	W	x	W	W	x	C	x	x	x
26	Jean-Philippe Baile	C	x	B	B	x	x	x	x	x	x	x	x	x	x	x	x	x	x	x	x	x	x	x	x	x	SR	x	B	B
27	Florian Quintilla	x	x	x	x	x	x	x	x	x	x	x	x	x	x	x	x	x	x	x	B	B	B	x	x	x	B	x	x	x
28	Julien Touxagas	x	x	x	B	x	B	B	B	B	B	x	B	B						B	B	B	B	B	B	B	L	B	x	x

= Injured

= Suspended

== Challenge Cup ==
LEGEND
Win
Draw
Loss

Date	Competition	Rnd	Vrs	H/A	Venue	Result	Score	Tries	Goals	Att	TV	Report
20 April 2008	Cup	4th	Featherstone Rovers	A	Post Office Road	W	22-12	Duport (2), Mogg, Murphy	Bosc 3/5	890	-	Report
11 May 2008	Cup	5th	Bradford Bulls	A	Odsal Stadium	L	16-46	Greenshields, Pelo, Touxagas	Bosc 2/3	5,057	-	Report

== Player appearances ==
- Challenge Cup games only

FB=Fullback	C=Centre	W=Winger	SO=Stand Off	SH=Scrum half	P=Prop	H=Hooker	SR=Second Row	L=Loose forward	B=Bench

No	Player	4	5
1	Clint Greenshields	x	FB
2	Justin Murphy	W	W
3	John Wilson		
4	Adam Mogg	SO	C
5	Dimitri Pelo	FB	W
6	Thomas Bosc	SH	SO
7	Casey McGuire	x	SH
8	David Ferriol	P	B
9	Aaron Gorrell	x	H
10	Jérôme Guisset	P	P
11	Sébastien Raguin	C	C
12	Jason Croker	x	SR
13	Grégory Mounis	H	SR
14	Dane Carlaw	SR	L
15	Mathieu Griffi	x	x
16	Olivier Elima	L	x
17	Cyrille Gossard	x	x
18	Vincent Duport	C	x
19	Alex Chan	x	P
20	Kane Bentley	B	x
21	Andrew Bentley	B	x
22	Jamal Fakir	x	B
23	Cyril Stacul	W	x
24	Rémi Casty	B	B
25	Younes Khattabi	x	x
26	Jean-Philippe Baile	x	x
27	Florian Quintilla	B	x
28	Julien Touxagas	SR	B

== Squad statistics ==
- Appearances and Points include (Super League, Challenge Cup and play-offs) as of 20 September 2008.

No	Player	Position	Age	Previous club	Apps	Tries	Goals	DG	Points
1	Clint Greenshields	Fullback	26	St George Illawarra Dragons	30	18	0	0	72
2	Justin Murphy	Wing	29	Widnes Vikings	18	16	0	0	64
3	John Wilson	Centre	30	Wests Tigers	24	7	0	0	28
4	Adam Mogg	Centre	31	Canberra Raiders	27	7	0	1	29
5	Dimitri Pelo	Wing	23	Unattached	25	13	0	0	52
6	Thomas Bosc	Stand off	25	Catalans Dragons Academy	30	7	123	1	275
7	Casey McGuire	Stand off	28	Brisbane Broncos	20	7	0	0	28
8	David Ferriol	Prop	29	Limoux Grizzlies	16	2	0	0	8
9	Aaron Gorrell	Hooker	27	St George Illawarra Dragons	21	6	4	0	32
10	Jérôme Guisset	Prop	30	Wigan Warriors	26	2	0	0	8
11	Sébastien Raguin	Second row	29	Toulouse Olympique	31	8	0	0	32
12	Jason Croker	Second row	35	Canberra Raiders	23	2	0	0	8
13	Grégory Mounis	Loose forward	23	Catalans Dragons Academy	29	8	0	0	32
14	Dane Carlaw	Loose forward	28	Brisbane Broncos	28	3	0	0	12
15	Mathieu Griffi	Prop	25	Catalans Dragons Academy	3	0	0	0	0
16	Olivier Elima	Second row	25	Wakefield Trinity Wildcats	16	8	0	0	32
17	Cyrille Gossard	Second row	26	Catalans Dragons Academy	4	0	0	0	0
18	Vincent Duport	Wing	20	Catalans Dragons Academy	15	4	0	0	16
19	Alex Chan	Prop	33	Melbourne Storm	28	4	0	0	16
20	Kane Bentley	Hooker	21	Catalans Dragons Academy	1	0	0	0	0
21	Andrew Bentley	Second row	23	Catalans Dragons Academy	5	0	0	0	0
22	Jamal Fakir	Prop	26	Villeneuve Leopards	21	3	0	0	12
23	Cyril Stacul	Wing	23	Catalans Dragons Academy	14	2	0	0	8
24	Rémi Casty	Prop	23	Catalans Dragons Academy	28	2	0	0	8
25	Younes Khattabi	Wing	24	Catalans Dragons Academy	14	4	0	0	16
26	Jean-Philippe Baile	Centre	21	Rugby Union	6	1	0	0	4
27	Florian Quintilla	Second row	19	Catalans Dragons Academy	5	0	0	0	0
28	Julien Touxagas	Second row	24	Catalans Dragons Academy	19	3	0	0	12

== Transfers ==
=== In ===
	Name	Position	Signed from	Date
(Australia)	Dane Carlaw	Second row	Brisbane Broncos	July 2007
(France)	Jean-Philippe Baile	Centre	Rugby Union	September 2007
(France)	Olivier Elima	Second row	Wakefield Trinity Wildcats	September 2007

=== Out ===
	Name	Position	Club Signed	Date
(New Zealand)	Stacey Jones	Scum Half	Retired	September 2007
(France)	Adel Fellous	Prop	Toulouse Olympique	October 2007
(France)	Lionel Teixido	Hooker	Released	October 2007
(Australia)	Luke Quigley	Hooker	Released	October 2007
(France)	Sébastien Martins	Second row	Pia Donkeys	November 2007
