= 2009 Catalans Dragons season =

- Super League XIV Rank: 8th
- Play-off result: Qualifying Semi Final
- Challenge Cup: 5th Round
- 2009 record: Wins: 16; draws: 0; losses: 16
- Points scored: For: 722; against: 789

Team information
- Chairman: Bernard Guasch
- Head Coach: Kevin Walters
- Captain: Greg Bird
- Stadium: Stade Gilbert Brutus
- Avg. attendance: 8,965
- High attendance: 18,150 vs. Warrington Wolves

Top scorers
- Tries: Olivier Elima (19)
- Goals: Thomas Bosc (85)
- Points: Thomas Bosc (196)
← 2008	List of seasons	2010 →

This article details the Catalans Dragons rugby league football club's 2009 season. This is their 4th season in the Super League.

== Table ==
Pos	Team	Pld	W	D	L	PF	PA	PD	Pts	Qualification
1	Leeds Rhinos (L, C)	27	21	0	6	805	453	+352	42	Play-offs
2	St Helens	27	19	0	8	733	466	+267	38	Play-offs
3	Huddersfield Giants	27	18	0	9	690	416	+274	36	Play-offs
4	Hull Kingston Rovers	27	17	1	9	650	516	+134	35	Play-offs
5	Wakefield Trinity Wildcats	27	16	0	11	685	609	+76	32	Play-offs
6	Wigan Warriors	27	15	0	12	659	551	+108	30	Play-offs
7	Castleford Tigers	27	14	0	13	645	702	−57	28	Play-offs
8	Catalans Dragons	27	13	0	14	613	660	−47	26	Play-offs
9	Bradford Bulls	27	12	1	14	653	668	−15	25	
10	Warrington Wolves	27	12	0	15	649	705	−56	24	
11	Harlequins	27	11	0	16	591	691	−100	22	
12	Hull F.C.	27	10	0	17	502	623	−121	20	
13	Salford City Reds	27	7	0	20	456	754	−298	14	
14	Celtic Crusaders	27	3	0	24	357	874	−517	6	

Source: Rugby League Project
Rules for classification: 1) Points; 2) Points difference; 3) Number of points scored;
(C) Champions; (L) League Leaders' Shield Winners

== Milestones ==
- Round 1: Steven Bell, Shane Perry and Jason Ryles made their debuts for the Dragons.
- Round 1: Rémi Casty made his 50th appearance for the Dragons.
- Round 2: Thomas Bosc reached 500 points for the Dragons.
- Round 2: Thomas Bosc kicked his 200th goal for the Dragons.
- Round 4: Greg Bird made his debut for the Dragons.
- Round 4: Jason Croker made his 50th appearance for the Dragons.
- Round 6: David Ferriol made his 50th appearance for the Dragons.
- Round 6: Greg Bird scored his 1st try for the Dragons.
- Round 7: Casey McGuire made his 50th appearance for the Dragons.
- Round 7: Steven Bell scored his 1st try for the Dragons.
- Round 9: Jason Ryles scored his 1st try for the Dragons.
- Round 10: Greg Bird kicked his 1st goal for the Dragons.
- Round 11: Dimitri Pelo made his 50th appearance for the Dragons.
- Round 11: Grégory Mounis kicked his 1st goal for the Dragons.
- Round 14: Jérôme Guisset made his 100th appearance for the Dragons.
- Round 14: Julien Touxagas made his 50th appearance for the Dragons.
- Round 14: Shane Perry scored his 1st try for the Dragons.
- Round 14: Thomas Bosc reached 600 points for the Dragons.
- Round 18: Dimitri Pelo scored his 25th try and reached 100 points for the Dragons.
- Round 19: Jean-Philippe Baile scored his 1st hat-trick for the Dragons.
- Round 20: Cyrille Gossard made his 50th appearance for the Dragons.
- Round 21: Grégory Mounis made his 100th appearance for the Dragons.
- Round 24: Sébastien Raguin made his 50th appearance for the Dragons.
- Round 24: Olivier Elima scored his 1st hat-trick for the Dragons.
- Round 26: Casey McGuire kicked his 1st goal for the Dragons.
- Round 27: Olivier Elima scored his 25th try and reached 100 points for the Dragons.
- PSF: Dane Carlaw made his 50th appearance for the Dragons.
- QSF: Adam Mogg scored his 25th try and reached 100 points for the Dragons.
- QSF: Vincent Duport scored his 1st hat-trick for the Dragons.

== Fixtures and results ==
LEGEND
Win
Draw
Loss

2009 Super League

Date	Competition	Rnd	Vrs	H/A	Venue	Result	Score	Tries	Goals	Att	Report
14 February 2009	Super League XIV	1	Huddersfield Giants	H	Stade Gilbert Brutus	L	8-30	Pelo	Bosc 2/2	7,520	Report
21 February 2009	Super League XIV	2	Warrington Wolves	A	Halliwell Jones Stadium	W	40-20	Greenshields (2), Baile, Elima, Mounis, Pelo, Stacul	Bosc 6/7	7,947	Report
27 February 2009	Super League XIV	3	Hull F.C.	A	KC Stadium	L	12-28	Elima, Mogg	Bosc 2/2	12,482	Report
7 March 2009	Super League XIV	4	Castleford Tigers	H	Stade Gilbert Brutus	L	22-24	Stacul (2), Fakir, Greenshields	Bosc 3/4	8,150	Report
15 March 2009	Super League XIV	5	Wakefield Trinity Wildcats	A	Belle Vue	L	10-30	Baile, Pelo	Bosc 1/2	4,807	Report
21 March 2009	Super League XIV	6	Bradford Bulls	H	Stade Gilbert Brutus	L	24-30	Baile, Bird, Duport, Elima	Bosc 4/4	7,620	Report
27 March 2009	Super League XIV	7	Leeds Rhinos	A	Headingley Stadium	L	14-42	Bell, Bosc, Duport	Bosc 1/3	13,425	Report
9 April 2009	Super League XIV	8	Harlequins RL	A	Twickenham Stoop	W	28-24	Guisset (2), Elima, Greenshields, McGuire	Bosc 4/5	2,540	Report
13 April 2009	Super League XIV	9	Wigan Warriors	H	Stade Gilbert Brutus	W	40-24	Greenshields (2), Ryles (2), Bird, Mounis, Pelo	Bosc 6/7	9,490	Report
18 April 2009	Super League XIV	10	Salford City Reds	H	Stade Gilbert Brutus	W	38-6	Baile (2), Pelo (2), Bell, K.Bentley, Casty, Guisset	Bosc 1/4, Bird 2/4	8,327	Report
26 April 2009	Super League XIV	11	Hull Kingston Rovers	A	Craven Park	L	10-44	Greenshields, Pelo	Mounis 1/2	8,115	Report
3 May 2009	Magic Weekend	12	Leeds Rhinos	N	Murrayfield Stadium	L	16-36	K.Bentley, Elima, McGuire	Mounis 2/3	30,122	Report
16 May 2009	Super League XIV	13	St Helens R.F.C.	H	Stade Gilbert Brutus	L	28-32	Bell (2), Bosc (2), Mogg	Bosc 4/5	9,065	Report
23 May 2009	Super League XIV	14	Celtic Crusaders	A	Brewery Field	W	30-18	Bell, Bird, Elima, Mogg, Perry, Stacul	Bosc 3/6	2,927	Report
6 June 2009	Super League XIV	15	Leeds Rhinos	H	Stade Gilbert Brutus	W	32-30	Elima (2), Baile, Bell, Stacul	Bosc 6/7	7,913	Report
20 June 2009	Super League XIV	17	Warrington Wolves	N	Estadi Olímpic Lluís Companys	L	12-24	Croker, Stacul	Bosc 2/3	18,150	Report
27 June 2009	Super League XIV	18	Castleford Tigers	A	Wheldon Road	W	22-20	Baile, Carlaw, Greenshields, Pelo	Bosc 3/4	5,508	Report
4 July 2009	Super League XIV	19	Hull Kingston Rovers	H	Stade Gilbert Brutus	W	23-12	Baile (3), Croker	Bosc 3/4, Bosc 1 DG	9,073	Report
10 July 2009	Super League XIV	20	Wigan Warriors	A	JJB Stadium	L	22-24	Bell, Bird, Elima, Pelo	Bosc 3/4	11,543	Report
19 July 2009	Super League XIV	21	Harlequins RL	H	Stade Gilbert Brutus	W	38-16	Pelo (2), Baile, Bell, Bosc, Elima, McGuire	Bosc 5/7	8,324	Report
26 July 2009	Super League XIV	22	Huddersfield Giants	A	Galpharm Stadium	L	12-36	Greenshields, Pelo	Bosc 2/2	5,823	Report
1 August 2009	Super League XIV	23	Celtic Crusaders	H	Stade Gilbert Brutus	W	34-0	Bell, K.Bentley, Bird, Croker, Greenshields, McGuire, Pelo	Bosc 3/7	6,874	Report
7 August 2009	Super League XIV	16	Salford City Reds	A	The Willows	W	18-16	Carlaw, Elima, Mogg, McGuire	Bosc 0/3, Mounis 1/1	3,475	Report
15 August 2009	Super League XIV	24	Hull F.C.	N	Stade de la Méditerranée	W	18-6	Elima (3)	Mounis 2/2, Bird 1/1	9,800	Report
23 August 2009	Super League XIV	25	Bradford Bulls	A	Odsal Stadium	L	18-42	Gossard, Martins, Raguin	Mounis 3/3	7,919	Report
5 September 2009	Super League XIV	26	Wakefield Trinity Wildcats	H	Stade Gilbert Brutus	L	20-34	McGuire (2), Raguin (2)	Bosc 1/3, McGuire 1/1	8,755	Report
11 September 2009	Super League XIV	27	St Helens R.F.C.	A	Knowsley Road	W	24-12	Elima, Greenshields, McGuire, Pelo	Bosc 4/4	8,268	Report

Super League Play-offs

Date	Competition	Rnd	Vrs	H/A	Venue	Result	Score	Tries	Goals	Att	Report
19 September 2009	Super League XIV	EPO	Wakefield Trinity Wildcats	A	Belle Vue	W	25-16	Pelo (2), Duport, Elima	Bosc 4/4, Bosc 1 DG	4,008	Report
25 September 2009	Super League XIV	PSF	Huddersfield Giants	A	Galpharm Stadium	W	16-6	Elima, Greenshields, Pelo	Bosc 2/3	4,263	Report
2 October 2009	Super League XIV	QSF	Leeds Rhinos	A	Headingley Stadium	L	20-27	Duport (3), Mogg	Bosc 2/4	13,409	Report

== Player appearances ==
- Super League only

FB=Fullback	C=Centre	W=Winger	SO=Stand-off	SH=Scrum half	PR=Prop	H=Hooker	SR=Second Row	L=Loose forward	B=Bench

No	Player	1	2	3	4	5	6	7	8	9	10	11	12	13	14	15	17	18	19	20	21	22	23	16	24	25	26	27	EPO	PSF	QSF
1	Clint Greenshields	FB	FB	FB	FB	FB	FB	FB	FB	FB	FB	FB	FB	FB	FB		FB	FB	FB	FB	FB	FB	FB		FB		FB	FB	FB	FB	FB
2	Cyril Stacul	W	W	W	W	W									W	W	W				W			W	W	W	W				
3	Steven Bell	C	C		C	C	C	C	C	C	C	C	C	C	W	W	W	W	W	W	C	W	W								
4	Adam Mogg	C	C	C	C	C			x	x	x	x	SH	SO	C	SH	SO	SO	SO					SO	SH	SH	SO	SO	SO	SO	SO
5	Dimitri Pelo	W	W	W	W	W	W	W	W	W	W	W	W	W				W	W	W	W	W	W	W	W	FB	W	W	W	W	W
6	Thomas Bosc	SO	SO	SO	SO	SO	SO	SO	SH	SH	SH			SH	SH	FB	SH	SH	SH	SH	SH	SH	SH	FB			SH	SH	SH	SH	SH
7	Shane Perry	SH	SH	SH	SH	SH	SH	SH				SH			B	B	B	B	B	B	B	B									
8	David Ferriol	B	B	P	P	P	B		B	B	B	P	B	B	B	B	B	P	P	P	P	P		B	B	L	B	B	B	B	B
9	Casey McGuire	H		H	H	H	H	H	H	H	H	H	H	H		H	H	H	H	H	H	H	H	SH	H	H	H	H	H	H	H
10	Jérôme Guisset	P	P	P	P	B	B	B	P	P	P	P	P	P	P	P	P	P	P	P		P	P	P	P	P	P	P	P	P	P
11	Sébastien Raguin																								C	C	C	C	C	C	C
12	Jason Croker	B	SR	SR	SR			SR	SR	SR						C	C	C	C	C			C	C			B				
13	Grégory Mounis	L	L	L	L	SR	SR	L	B	B	SR	SO	L	B	L	L		B	B	B	B	L	B	B	B	SR	B				
14	Dane Carlaw	SR	P					B	B	L	L	L	SR	P	P	P	P	L			L	B	SR	SR	B				B	B	B
15	Jean-Philippe Baile	x	H	C	B	B	C	C	C	C	C	C	C	C	C	C	C	C	C	C	C	C	C	C	C		C	C	C	C	C
16	Olivier Elima	B	B	SR	B	P	B	P	SR	SR	SR	SR	SR		SR	SR	SR	SR	SR	SR	SR	SR		B	SR	SR	SR	SR	SR	SR	SR
17	Cyrille Gossard	x	B	B	x	SR	SR	B	L	x	B	x	B	x	SR	SR	SR	SR	SR	SR	SR	C	SR	SR	SR	C	SR	SR	SR	SR	SR
18	Vincent Duport	x	x	B	x	x	W	W	W	W	W	W	W	W	x	x	x	x	x	x	x	x	x	x	x	W	x	W	W	W	W
19	Julien Touxagas	x	x	B	x	x	x	x	x	x	x	B	x	SR	B	B	B	x	x	x	x	x	x	x	x	B	x	B	B	B	B
20	Kane Bentley	x	x	x	x	x	x	x	B	B	B	B	B	B	H								B	H		B	x	x	x	x	x
21	Florian Quintilla	x	x	x	x	x	x	x	x	x	x	SR	x	x	x	x	x	x	– (Note: On loan at Toulouse Olympique)												
22	Jamal Fakir	SR	SR		SR	L	P					B	B	SR			L	x	x	B	B	B	L	L	L						
23	Jason Ryles	P					P	P	P	P	P						B	B	L	L	P	SR	P	P	P	P	P	P	P	P	P
24	Rémi Casty	B	B	B	B	B	B	B	x	B	B	B	P	B	B	B		B	B	B	B	B	B	B	B	B	B	B	B	B	B
25	Frédéric Vaccari	x	x	x	x	x	x	x	x	x	x	x	x	x	x	x	x	x	x	x	x	x	x	x	x	x	x	x	x	x	x
26	Greg Bird	– (Note: Was at Cronulla-Sutherland Sharks)			B	B	L	SR	SO	SO	SO		SO	L	SO	SO				SO	SO	SO	SO		SO	SO	L	L	L	L	L
27	Sébastien Martins	– (Note: Was at Pia Donkeys)																	B	x	x	x	B	x	x	B	x	B	x	x	x
28	Andrew Bentley	x	x	x	x	x	x	x	x	x	x	x	x	x	x	x	x	x	x	x	x	x	x	x	x	x	x	x	x	x	x

= Injured

= Suspended

== Challenge Cup ==
LEGEND
Win
Draw
Loss

Date	Competition	Rnd	Vrs	H/A	Venue	Result	Score	Tries	Goals	Att	TV	Report
5 April 2009	Cup	4th	Bradford Bulls	H	Stade Gilbert Brutus	W	40-38	Bosc (2), Elima (2), Baile, Ferriol, Gossard	Bosc 6/7	6,450	BBC Two	Report
10 May 2009	Cup	5th	St Helens R.F.C.	A	Knowsley Road	L	8-42	Gossard	Bosc 2/2	7,176	BBC Two	Report

== Player appearances ==
- Challenge Cup games only

FB=Fullback	C=Centre	W=Winger	SO=Stand Off	SH=Scrum half	P=Prop	H=Hooker	SR=Second Row	L=Loose forward	B=Bench

No	Player	4	5
1	Clint Greenshields	FB	FB
2	Cyril Stacul		
3	Steven Bell	C	C
4	Adam Mogg	SO	SO
5	Dimitri Pelo	W	W
6	Thomas Bosc	SH	SH
7	Shane Perry	x	
8	David Ferriol	B	B
9	Casey McGuire	H	B
10	Jérôme Guisset	P	P
11	Sébastien Raguin		
12	Jason Croker	SR	
13	Grégory Mounis	x	L
14	Dane Carlaw	B	B
15	Jean-Philippe Baile	C	C
16	Olivier Elima	SR	SR
17	Cyrille Gossard	B	SR
18	Vincent Duport	W	W
19	Julien Touxagas	x	x
20	Kane Bentley	B	H
21	Florian Quintilla	x	x
22	Jamal Fakir		B
23	Jason Ryles	P	
24	Rémi Casty	x	P
25	Frédéric Vaccari	x	x
26	Greg Bird	L	
27	Andrew Bentley	x	x

== Squad statistics ==
- Appearances and Points include (Super League, Challenge Cup and play-offs) as of 2 October 2009.

No	Player	Position	Age	Previous club	Apps	Tries	Goals	DG	Points
1	Clint Greenshields	Fullback	27	St George Illawarra Dragons	29	12	0	0	48
2	Cyril Stacul	Wing	24	Catalans Dragons Academy	13	6	0	0	24
3	Steven Bell	Centre	33	Manly-Warringah Sea Eagles	23	9	0	0	36
4	Adam Mogg	Centre	32	Canberra Raiders	22	5	0	0	20
5	Dimitri Pelo	Wing	24	Unattached	29	17	0	0	68
6	Thomas Bosc	Stand off	26	Catalans Dragons Academy	28	6	85	2	196
7	Shane Perry	Scrum half	32	Brisbane Broncos	16	1	0	0	4
8	David Ferriol	Prop	30	Limoux Grizzlies	30	1	0	0	4
9	Casey McGuire	Hooker	29	Brisbane Broncos	30	8	1	0	34
10	Jérôme Guisset	Prop	31	Wigan Warriors	31	3	0	0	12
11	Sébastien Raguin	Second row	30	Toulouse Olympique	7	3	0	0	12
12	Jason Croker	Second row	36	Canberra Raiders	16	3	0	0	12
13	Grégory Mounis	Loose forward	24	Catalans Dragons Academy	26	2	9	0	26
14	Dane Carlaw	Loose forward	29	Brisbane Broncos	23	2	0	0	8
15	Jean-Philippe Baile	Centre	22	Rugby Union	30	12	0	0	48
16	Olivier Elima	Second row	26	Wakefield Trinity Wildcats	30	19	0	0	76
17	Cyrille Gossard	Second row	27	Catalans Dragons Academy	27	3	0	0	12
18	Vincent Duport	Wing	21	Catalans Dragons Academy	16	6	0	0	24
19	Julien Touxagas	Second row	25	Catalans Dragons Academy	11	0	0	0	0
20	Kane Bentley	Hooker	22	Catalans Dragons Academy	12	3	0	0	12
21	Florian Quintilla	Second row	20	Catalans Dragons Academy	1	0	0	0	0
22	Jamal Fakir	Prop	27	Villeneuve Leopards	16	1	0	0	4
23	Jason Ryles	Prop	30	St George Illawarra Dragons	22	2	0	0	8
24	Rémi Casty	Prop	24	Catalans Dragons Academy	29	1	0	0	4
25	Frédéric Vaccari	Wing	21	Toulouse Olympique	0	0	0	0	0
26	Greg Bird	Loose forward	25	Cronulla-Sutherland Sharks	23	5	3	0	26
27	Sébastien Martins	Second row	24	Pia Donkeys	4	1	0	0	4
28	Andrew Bentley	Second row	24	Catalans Dragons Academy	0	0	0	0	0

== Transfers ==
=== In ===
	Name	Position	Signed from	Date
(Australia)	Steven Bell	Centre	Manly-Warringah Sea Eagles	June 2008
(Australia)	Jason Ryles	Prop	St George Illawarra Dragons	June 2008
(Australia)	Shane Perry	Scrum half	Brisbane Broncos	July 2008
(France)	Frédéric Vaccari	Wing	Toulouse Olympique	July 2008
(Australia)	Greg Bird	Loose forward	Cronulla-Sutherland Sharks	March 2009
(France)	Sébastien Martins	Second row	Pia Donkeys	July 2009

=== Out ===
	Name	Position	Club Signed	Date
(Australia)	John Wilson	Centre	Retirement	September 2007
(New Zealand)	Alex Chan	Prop	Retirement	September 2008
(Australia)	Justin Murphy	Wing	Retirement	September 2008
(Morocco)	Younes Khattabi	Wing	RC Carpentras XIII	October 2008
(Australia)	Aaron Gorrell	Hooker	Brisbane Broncos	November 2008
(France)	Mathieu Griffi	Prop	Toulouse Olympique	November 2008
(France)	Florian Quintilla	Second row	Toulouse Olympique (Loan)	July 2009
