= 2010 Catalans Dragons season =

- Super League XV Rank: 14th
- Play-off result: Did not qualify
- Challenge Cup: Semi-final
- 2010 record: Wins: 9; draws: 0; losses: 22
- Points scored: For: 580; against: 855

Team information
- Chairman: Bernard Guasch
- Head Coach: Kevin Walters
- Captain: Thomas Bosc
- Stadium: Stade Gilbert Brutus
- Avg. attendance: 6,694
- High attendance: 8,884 vs. Bradford Bulls

Top scorers
- Tries: Clint Greenshields (11)
- Goals: Thomas Bosc (62)
- Points: Thomas Bosc (137)
← 2009	List of seasons	2011 →

This article details the Catalans Dragons rugby league football club's 2010 season. This is their 5th season in the Super League.

== Table ==
Pos	Team	Pld	W	D	L	PF	PA	PD	Pts	Qualification
1	Wigan Warriors (L, C)	27	22	0	5	922	411	+511	44	Play-offs
2	St Helens	27	20	0	7	946	547	+399	40	Play-offs
3	Warrington Wolves	27	20	0	7	885	488	+397	40	Play-offs
4	Leeds Rhinos	27	17	1	9	725	561	+164	35	Play-offs
5	Huddersfield Giants	27	16	1	10	758	439	+319	33	Play-offs
6	Hull F.C.	27	16	0	11	569	584	−15	32	Play-offs
7	Hull Kingston Rovers	27	14	1	12	653	632	+21	29	Play-offs
8	Celtic Crusaders	27	12	0	15	547	732	−185	24	Play-offs
9	Castleford Tigers	27	11	0	16	648	766	−118	22	
10	Bradford Bulls	27	9	1	17	528	728	−200	19	
11	Wakefield Trinity Wildcats	27	9	0	18	539	741	−202	18	
12	Salford City Reds	27	8	0	19	448	857	−409	16	
13	Harlequins	27	7	0	20	494	838	−344	14	
14	Catalans Dragons	27	6	0	21	409	747	−338	12	

Source: Rugby League Project
Rules for classification: 1) Points; 2) Points difference; 3) Number of points scored;
(C) Champions; (L) League Leaders' Shield Winners

== Milestones ==
- Round 1: Setaimata Sa, Dallas Johnson and Chris Walker made their debuts for the Dragons.
- Round 1: Chris Walker scored his 1st try for the Dragons.
- Round 1: Chris Walker kicked his 1st goal for the Dragons.
- Round 2: William Barthau made his debut for the Dragons.
- Round 3: Setaimata Sa scored his 1st try for the Dragons.
- Round 5: Olivier Elima made his 50th appearance for the Dragons.
- Round 7: David Guasch and Tony Gigot made their debuts for the Dragons.
- Round 9: Frédéric Vaccari and Mickaël Simon made their debuts for the Dragons.
- Round 9: William Barthau kicked his 1st goal for the Dragons.
- Round 10: Dallas Johnson scored his 1st try for the Dragons.
- Round 11: Frédéric Vaccari scored his 1st try for the Dragons.
- Round 11: Grégory Mounis reached 100 points for the Dragons.
- Round 11: Thomas Bosc reached 700 points for the Dragons.
- CCR4: Casey McGuire scored his 25th try and reached 100 points for the Dragons.
- CCR5: Thomas Bosc made his 100th appearance for the Dragons.
- CCR5: Setaimata Sa scored his 1st hat-trick for the Dragons.
- Round 15: Brent Sherwin made his debut for the Dragons.
- CCQF: Tony Gigot scored his 1st try for the Dragons.
- CCQF: Thomas Bosc kicked his 300th goal for the Dragons.
- Round 21: Brent Sherwin scored his 1st try for the Dragons.
- Round 21: Clint Greenshields scored his 50th try and reached 200 points for the Dragons.
- Round 22: Clint Greenshields made his 100th appearance for the Dragons.
- Round 23: Thomas Bosc reached 800 points for the Dragons.
- Round 23: Brent Sherwin kicked his 1st drop goal for the Dragons.
- CCSF: Rémi Casty made his 100th appearance for the Dragons.
- Round 27: Tony Gigot kicked his 1st goal for the Dragons.

== Pre-season friendlies ==
LEGEND
Win
Draw
Loss

Dragons score is first.

Date	Competition	Vrs	H/A	Venue	Result	Score	Tries	Goals	Att	Report
27 January 2009	Pre Season	Toulouse Olympique	A	Stade des Minimes	W	46-22	Bell (2), Greenshields (2), Raguin (2), Elima, Guisset, Mounis	Bosc 5/9	4,128	Report

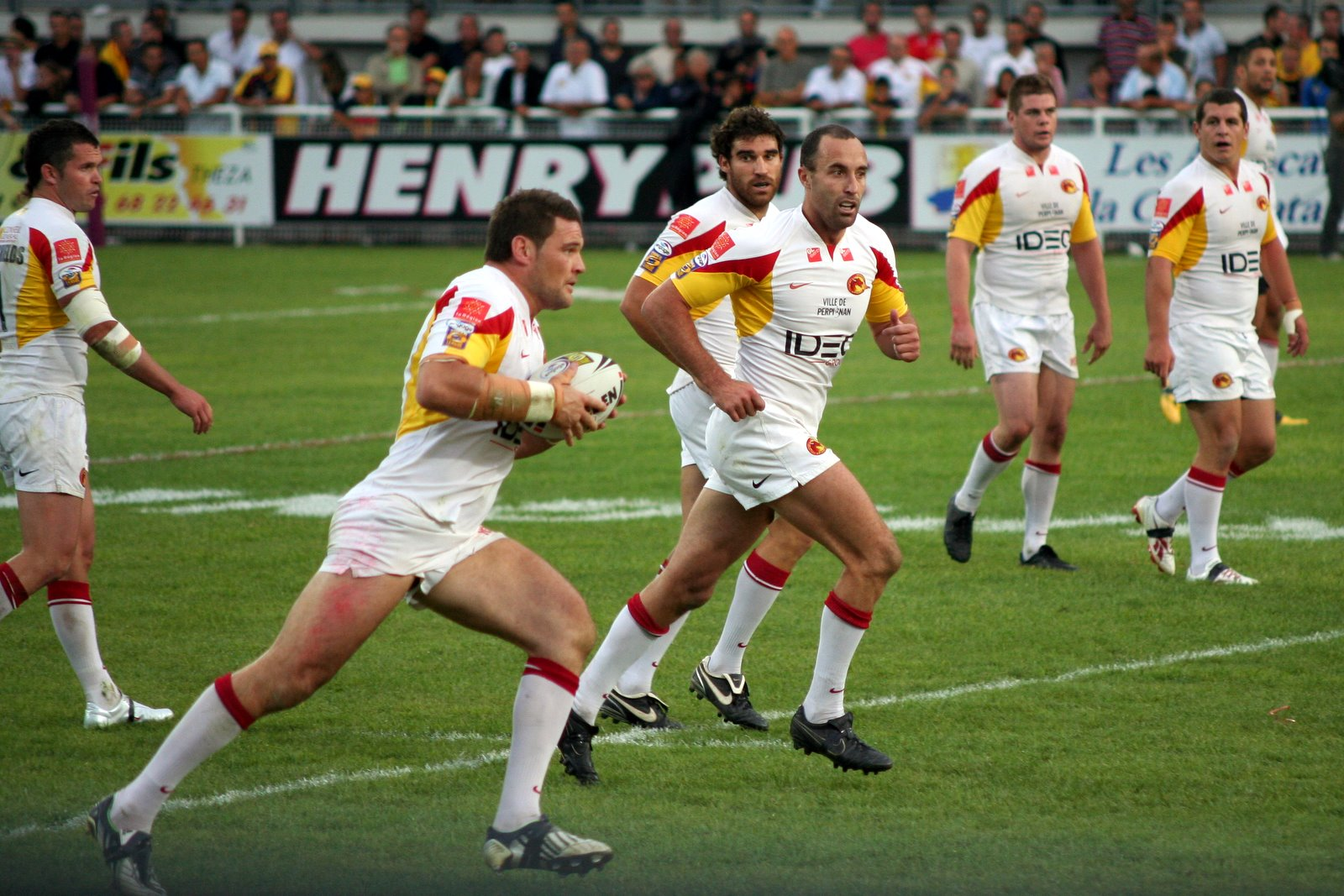
Dragons during a Super League game in September

== Fixtures and results ==
LEGEND
Win
Draw
Loss

2010 Super League

Date	Competition	Rnd	Vrs	H/A	Venue	Result	Score	Tries	Goals	Att	Report
7 February 2010	Super League XV	1	Wakefield Trinity Wildcats	A	Belle Vue	L	20-28	Elima, Martins, Pelo, Walker	Walker 2/4	5,818	Report
14 February 2010	Super League XV	2	Harlequins RL	A	Twickenham Stoop	L	4-16	Greenshields	Barthau 0/1	2,330	Report
20 February 2010	Super League XV	3	St Helens R.F.C.	H	Stade Gilbert Brutus	L	12-42	Walker (2), Sa	Barthau 0/3	7,825	Report
26 February 2010	Super League XV	4	Wigan Warriors	A	DW Stadium	L	0-58	-	-	12,001	Report
5 March 2010	Super League XV	5	Salford City Reds	A	The Willows	W	24-12	Walker (2), Greenshields, Raguin, Sa	Walker 0/2, Mounis 2/3	3,022	Report
13 March 2010	Super League XV	6	Castleford Tigers	H	Stade Gilbert Brutus	L	16-20	Fakir, McGuire, Walker	Walker 0/1, Mounis 2/2	6,810	Report
19 March 2010	Super League XV	7	Crusaders RL	A	Racecourse Ground	L	6-14	Elima	Mounis 1/1	6,124	Report
27 March 2010	Super League XV	8	Hull Kingston Rovers	H	Stade Gilbert Brutus	W	16-10	Bell, Carlaw, Gossard	Bosc 2/3	6,513	Report
2 April 2010	Super League XV	9	Huddersfield Giants	A	Galpharm Stadium	L	6-48	Pelo	Barthau 1/1	5,926	Report
5 April 2010	Super League XV	10	Leeds Rhinos	H	Stade Aimé Giral	L	24-34	K. Bentley, Guisset, Johnson, Touxagas	Bosc 4/4	8,230	Report
10 April 2010	Super League XV	11	Bradford Bulls	H	Stade Aimé Giral	L	14-36	Bell, Mounis, Vaccari	Bosc 1/3	8,884	Report
25 April 2010	Super League XV	12	Warrington Wolves	A	Halliwell Jones Stadium	L	6-40	Carlaw	Mounis 1/1	9,619	Report
2 May 2010	Magic Weekend	13	Castleford Tigers	N	Murrayfield Stadium	L	18-34	Baile, Elima, Mounis, Vaccari	Mounis 1/4	25,401	Report
15 May 2010	Super League XV	14	Hull F.C.	H	Stade Gilbert Brutus	L	14-28	Bell, Pelo, Raguin	Bosc 1/3	6,512	Report
22 May 2010	Super League XV	15	Salford City Reds	H	Stade Gilbert Brutus	L	14-22	Bosc (2)	Bosc 3/3	5,115	Report
6 June 2010	Super League XV	16	Hull Kingston Rovers	A	Craven Park	L	6-24	Raguin	Bosc 1/1	7,102	Report
15 June 2010	Super League XV	17	Castleford Tigers	A	Wheldon Road	L	20-24	Vaccari (2), McGuire, Raguin	Barthau 2/4	4,209	Report
19 June 2010	Super League XV	18	Wakefield Trinity Wildcats	H	Stade Gilbert Brutus	W	30-23	Elima, Greenshields, Pelo, Raguin, Sa	Bosc 5/5	5,055	Report
25 June 2010	Super League XV	19	Hull F.C.	A	KC Stadium	L	8-10	McGuire	Bosc 2/2	11,466	Report
4 July 2010	Super League XV	20	Wigan Warriors	H	Stade Gilbert Brutus	L	16-34	Greenshields (2), Stacul	Bosc 2/3	7,612	Report
9 July 2010	Super League XV	21	St Helens R.F.C.	A	Knowsley Road	W	30-20	Greenshields (2), Carlaw, McGuire, Sherwin	Bosc 5/5	8,442	Report
17 July 2010	Super League XV	22	Crusaders RL	H	Stade Gilbert Brutus	L	22-26	Greenshields (2), Casty	Bosc 5/5	6,208	Report
24 July 2010	Super League XV	23	Warrington Wolves	H	Stade Aimé Giral	W	29-28	Bell, Carlaw, Casty, Stacul, Vaccari	Bosc 4/5, Sherwin 1 DG	7,852	Report
1 August 2010	Super League XV	24	Bradford Bulls	A	Odsal Stadium	W	24-22	Bell, Elima, Raguin, Sa	Bosc 4/4	6,217	Report
14 August 2010	Super League XV	25	Harlequins RL	H	Stade Gilbert Brutus	L	12-16	Carlaw, Raguin	Bosc 2/2	6,152	Report
20 August 2010	Super League XV	26	Leeds Rhinos	A	Headingley Stadium	L	6-52	McGuire	Bosc 1/1	15,154	Report
4 September 2010	Super League XV	27	Huddersfield Giants	H	Stade Gilbert Brutus	L	12-26	Sa, Vaccari	Gigot 2/2	5,708	Report

== Player appearances ==
- Super League only

FB=Fullback	C=Centre	W=Winger	SO=Stand-off	SH=Scrum half	PR=Prop	H=Hooker	SR=Second Row	L=Loose forward	B=Bench

No	Player	1	2	3	4	5	6	7	8	9	10	11	12	13	14	15	16	17	18	19	20	21	22	23	24	25	26	27
1	Clint Greenshields		FB	FB	FB	FB	FB												FB	FB	FB	FB	FB			FB		FB
2	Steven Bell	W	W			W	W	W	W	W	W	C	W	W	W	W	W	W	W			W	W	W	W	W	W	
3	Sébastien Raguin	B	B	B	SR	C	C	C	C				C	C	C	C	C	C	C	C	C	C	C	C	C	C		C
4	Setaimata Sa	C	C	C	C	SO	SO	SO	SO			SR	B	C	C	C	C	SO	C	C				B	L	B	B	SR
5	Dimitri Pelo	W	W	W	W	W		C	C	FB	FB	W	FB	FB	FB	FB	FB		W						FB			
6	Adam Mogg	SO	SO	SO	SO				– (Note: Joined Canberra Raiders)																			
7	Thomas Bosc								SH	SH	SH	SH	SH	SH	SH	SH	SH		SO	SO	SO	SO	SO	SO	SO	SO	SO	
8	David Ferriol	P	P	P	P	P	P	P	P		P	P	P		P		P	P	P	P					B	P	P	
9	Casey McGuire	SH	H	H	H	SH	SH	SH	H	H	SO	SO	SO	SO				H	H	H	H	H	H	H			H	H
10	Jérôme Guisset	P	P		B	B	B	B	B	P	P	P	P	P	P	P	P	P	P	P	P	P	P	B				
11	Olivier Elima	SR	SR	SR	Red card	SR	SR	SR	SR				SR	SR	SR	SR	SR	SR	SR	SR	SR		SR	SR	SR	SR	SR	SR
12	Grégory Mounis	H	B	B	B	B	B	B	B	SR	SR	B	SR	SR	SR	SR	H	B	SR	SR		SR	SR	SR	SR	SR		
13	Dallas Johnson	L	L	L	L	L	L	L	L	L	L	L	L	L	L	L	L	L	L	L	L	L	L	L		L	L	L
14	David Guasch	x	x	x	x	x	x	FB	x	x	x	x	x	x	x	x	x	x	x	x	x	x	x	x	x	x	x	x
15	Jean-Philippe Baile	C										C	C	H	H													
16	William Barthau	x	SH	SH	SH	x	x	x	x	SO	x	x	x	x	x	x	x	FB	x	x	B	x	x	x	x	SH	x	x
17	Cyrille Gossard	SR	SR	SR	SR	SR	SR	SR	SR				B					C	B	B	SR	SR	B		B	B	SR	B
18	Dane Carlaw	x	B	P	P	P	P	P	P	SR	C	SR	B	P	B	B	SR	SR	B	W	C	C	C	C	C	C	C	C
19	Julien Touxagas	x	x	x	x	x	x	x	x	C	C	x	x	B	x	x	x	x	x	x	x	x	x	B	x	x	B	x
20	Kane Bentley	B	x	x	x	H	H	H	x	B	H	H	x	B	B	H		x	x	x	x	x	x	x	H	H	B	x
21	Sébastien Martins	B	x	x	x	B	x	x	B	B	B	B	x	B	x	x	x	x	x	x	x	x	x	x	x	x	x	B
22	Jamal Fakir		B	B	B	B	B	B		P	SR				B	B	B	B		B	B	B	B	P	P			P
23	Chris Walker	FB	C	C	C	C	C		FB	Red card	Red card	FB													W	W	C	
24	Rémi Casty	B		B	B	x	B					B	B	B	B	P	B	B	B	B	P	P	P	P	P	P	P	P
25	Tony Gigot	x	x	x	x	x	x	B	B	C	B	B	H	x	SO	B	B	x	x	x	x	B	B	x	B	B	B	SO
26	Cyril Stacul	x	x	W	W	x	W	W	W	x	B	x	x	x	x	x	x	x	x	x	W	W	W	FB	x	x	FB	W
27	Mickaël Simon	x	x	x	x	x	x	x	x	B	x	x	x	x	x	x	x	x	x	B	B	B	B	B	B	B	x	B
28	Frédéric Vaccari	x	x	x	x	x	x	x	x	W	W	W	W	W	W	W	W	W	B	W	W	x	x	W	x	x	W	W
29	Andrew Bentley	x	x	x	x	x	x	x	x	B	B	x	x	x	x	B	B	B	x	x	B	B	x	x	x	x	x	B
30	Brent Sherwin	– (Note: Was at Castleford Tigers)														SO	SO	SH	SH	SH	SH	SH	SH	SH	SH		SH	SH

= Injured

= Suspended

== Challenge Cup ==
LEGEND
Win
Draw
Loss

Date	Competition	Rnd	Vrs	H/A	Venue	Result	Score	Tries	Goals	Att	TV	Report
18 April 2010	Cup	4th	Salford City Reds	H	Stade Gilbert Brutus	W	30-8	Vaccari (2), Bell, Casty, Guisset, McGuire	Bosc 2/5, Mounis 1/1, Gigot 0/1	5,238	-	Report
9 May 2010	Cup	5th	Crusaders RL	A	Racecourse Ground	W	35-34	Sa (3), Bell, Bosc, Carlaw	Bosc 5/6, Bosc 1 DG	1,817	-	Report
30 May 2010	Cup	QF	Batley Bulldogs	A	Mount Pleasant	W	74-12	Elima (2), Fakir (2), Bell, A. Bentley, Carlaw, Casty, Ferriol, Gigot, Guisset, Raguin, Vaccari	Bosc 11/13	2,132	-	Report
8 August 2010	Cup	SF	Warrington Wolves	N	Stobart Stadium	L	12-54	Greenshields (2)	Bosc 2/2	12,265	BBC Sport	Report

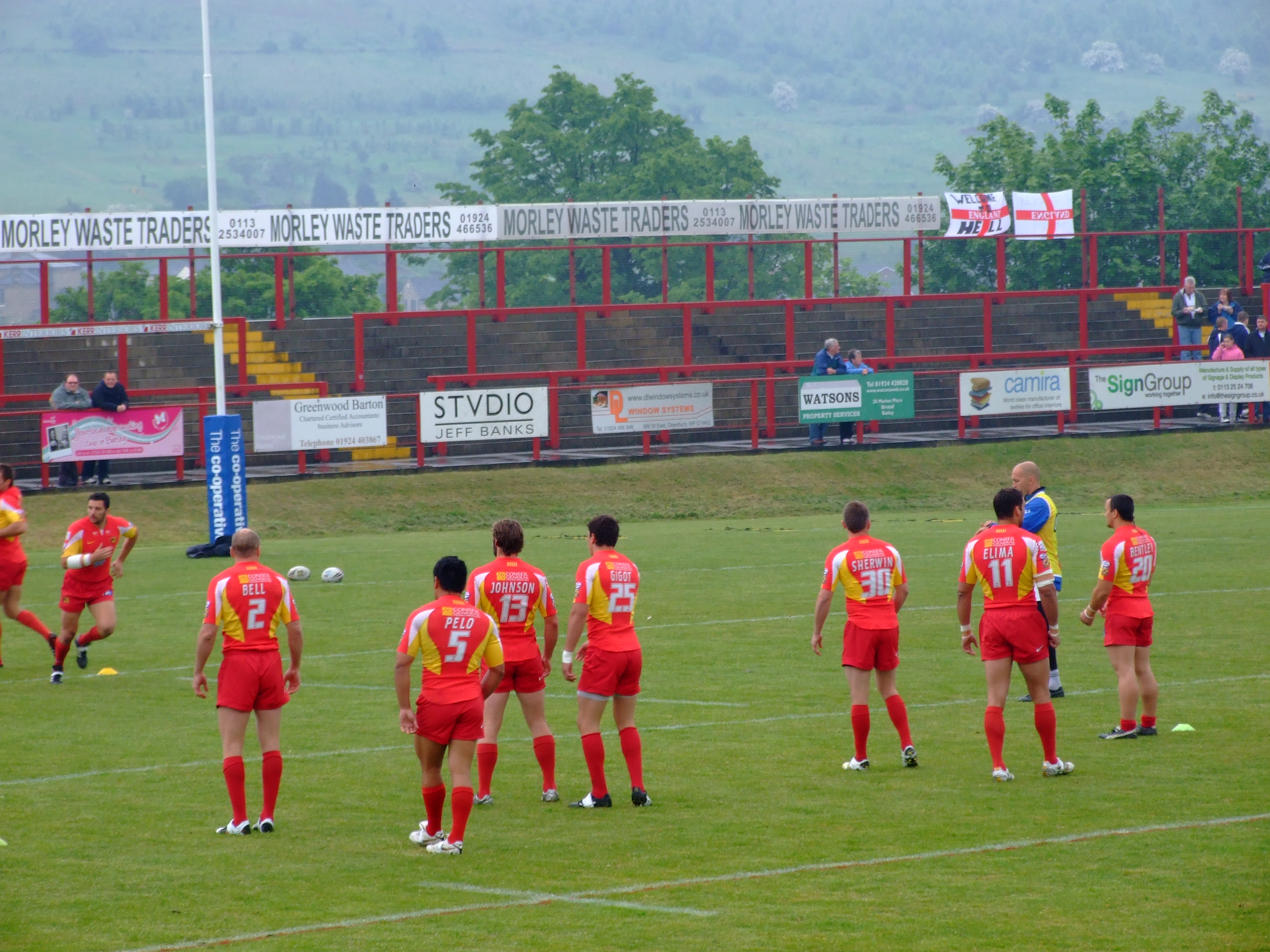
The Catalans Dragons warming up against the Batley Bulldogs at Mount Pleasant in 2010

== Player appearances ==
- Challenge Cup games only

FB=Fullback	C=Centre	W=Winger	SO=Stand Off	SH=Scrum half	P=Prop	H=Hooker	SR=Second Row	L=Loose forward	B=Bench

No	Player	4	5	QF	SF
1	Clint Greenshields				FB
2	Steven Bell	W	W	W	W
3	Sébastien Raguin	C	C	C	C
4	Setaimata Sa		C	C	L
5	Dimitri Pelo	FB	FB	FB	
6	Adam Mogg	– (Note: Joined Canberra Raiders)			
7	Thomas Bosc	SH	SH	SH	SO
8	David Ferriol	P	P	P	B
9	Casey McGuire	SO	SO		H
10	Jérôme Guisset	P	P	P	B
11	Olivier Elima	SR	SR	SR	SR
12	Grégory Mounis	L	SR	Red card	SR
13	Dallas Johnson		L	L	
14	David Guasch	x	x	x	x
15	Jean-Philippe Baile	C	H		
16	William Barthau	x	x	x	x
17	Cyrille Gossard	SR			B
18	Dane Carlaw	B	B	SR	C
19	Julien Touxagas	x	x	x	x
20	Kane Bentley	H	B	H	x
21	Sébastien Martins	B	x	x	x
22	Jamal Fakir		B	B	P
23	Chris Walker				W
24	Rémi Casty	B	B	B	P
25	Tony Gigot	B	x	B	x
26	Cyril Stacul	x	x	x	x
27	Mickaël Simon	x	x	x	B
28	Frédéric Vaccari	W	W	W	x
29	Andrew Bentley	x	x	B	x
30	Brent Sherwin	– (Note: Was at Castleford Tigers)		SO	SH

= Injured

= Suspended

== Squad statistics ==
- Appearances and Points include (Super League, Challenge Cup and Play-offs) as of 4 September 2010.

No	Player	Position	Age	Previous club	Apps	Tries	Goals	DG	Points
1	Clint Greenshields	Fullback	28	St George Illawarra Dragons	13	11	0	0	44
2	Steven Bell	Wing	34	Manly-Warringah Sea Eagles	26	8	0	0	32
3	Sébastien Raguin	Centre	31	Toulouse Olympique	27	8	0	0	32
4	Setaimata Sa	Centre	22	Sydney Roosters	25	8	0	0	32
5	Dimitri Pelo	Wing	25	Unattached	20	4	0	0	16
6	Adam Mogg	Stand off	33	Canberra Raiders	4	0	0	0	0
7	Thomas Bosc	Scrum half	27	Catalans Dragons Academy	22	3	62	1	137
8	David Ferriol	Prop	31	Limoux Grizzlies	23	1	0	0	4
9	Casey McGuire	Hooker	30	Brisbane Broncos	25	6	0	0	24
10	Jérôme Guisset	Prop	32	Wigan Warriors	26	3	0	0	12
11	Olivier Elima	Second row	27	Wakefield Trinity Wildcats	26	7	0	0	28
12	Grégory Mounis	Second row	25	Catalans Dragons Academy	27	2	8	0	24
13	Dallas Johnson	Loose forward	27	Melbourne Storm	28	1	0	0	4
14	David Guasch	Fullback	20	Catalans Dragons Academy	1	0	0	0	0
15	Jean-Philippe Baile	Centre	23	Rugby Union	7	1	0	0	4
16	William Barthau	Stand off	20	Catalans Dragons Academy	7	0	3	0	6
17	Cyrille Gossard	Second row	28	Catalans Dragons Academy	21	1	0	0	4
18	Dane Carlaw	Loose forward	30	Brisbane Broncos	30	7	0	0	28
19	Julien Touxagas	Second row	26	Catalans Dragons Academy	5	1	0	0	4
20	Kane Bentley	Hooker	23	Catalans Dragons Academy	16	1	0	0	4
21	Sébastien Martins	Second row	25	Pia Donkeys	9	1	0	0	4
22	Jamal Fakir	Prop	28	Villeneuve Leopards	22	3	0	0	12
23	Chris Walker	Centre	30	Gold Coast Titans	12	6	2	0	28
24	Rémi Casty	Prop	25	Catalans Dragons Academy	25	4	0	0	16
25	Tony Gigot	Stand off	19	Catalans Dragons Academy	17	1	2	0	8
26	Cyril Stacul	Wing	25	Catalans Dragons Academy	12	2	0	0	8
27	Mickaël Simon	Prop	23	Limoux Grizzlies	10	0	0	0	0
28	Frédéric Vaccari	Wing	22	Toulouse Olympique	18	9	0	0	36
29	Andrew Bentley	Second row	25	Catalans Dragons Academy	9	1	0	0	4
30	Brent Sherwin	Scrum half	32	Castleford Tigers	14	1	0	1	5

== Transfers ==
=== In ===
	Name	Position	Signed from	Date
(Samoa)	Setaimata Sa	Centre	Sydney Roosters	November 2009
(Australia)	Dallas Johnson	Loose forward	Melbourne Storm	November 2009
(France)	Mickaël Simon	Prop	Limoux Grizzlies	November 2009
(Australia)	Chris Walker	Centre	Gold Coast Titans	December 2009
(Australia)	Brent Sherwin	Scrum half	Castleford Tigers	May 2010

=== Out ===
	Name	Position	Club Signed	Date
(Australia)	Shane Perry	Scrum half	Released	October 2009
(Australia)	Jason Croker	Second row	Retired	October 2009
(France)	Vincent Duport	Wing	Toulouse Olympique	October 2009
(France)	Florian Quintilla	Second row	Released	October 2009
(Australia)	Jason Ryles	Prop	Sydney Roosters	November 2009
(Australia)	Greg Bird	Loose forward	Gold Coast Titans	December 2009
(Australia)	Adam Mogg	Stand off	Canberra Raiders	March 2010
