= Olivier Charles =

France international rugby league footballer

Personal information
- Full name: Olivier Charles
- Born: 12 July 1979 (age 46) France

Playing information
- Position: Wing
Club
Years	Team	Pld	T	G	FG	P
2000–06	Villeneuve Leopards	?
2006	Villefranche XIII
2007	Catalans Dragons	2	2	0	0	8
2007–2009	Villeneuve Leopards
	Total		2	0	0	8
Representative
Years	Team	Pld	T	G	FG	P
2005–06	France	9	5	0	0	20

Olivier Charles (born 12 July 1979) is a former France international rugby league footballer. He had a brief spell at the Catalans Dragons in the Super League, but was released due to off-field reasons.
