= Luke Quigley =

Australian rugby league footballer

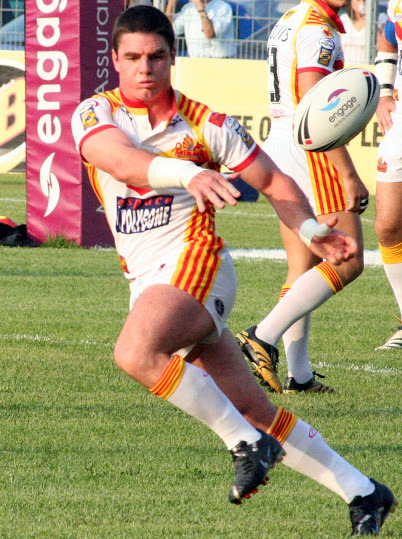

Personal information
- Born: 20 July 1981 (age 44) Dubbo, New South Wales, Australia

Playing information
- Position: Hooker
Club
Years	Team	Pld	T	G	FG	P
2002–06	Newcastle Knights	41	1	0	0	4
2007	Catalans Dragons	20	1	0	0	4
	Total	61	2	0	0	8
- Source: As of 7 February 2019

Luke Quigley (born 20 July 1981) is an Australian former professional rugby league footballer who played as a hooker for the Newcastle Knights in the National Rugby League (NRL) and the Catalans Dragons in the Super League.

== Background ==
Quigley went to school at St Gregory's College, Campbelltown.

== Playing career ==
Quigley made his first grade debut for Newcastle against the Wests Tigers in Round 15 2002. In 2003, Quigley made 21 appearances as Newcastle reached the finals but were eliminated by the Sydney Roosters.

In 2005, Quigley made 16 appearances as Newcastle finished last claiming the wooden spoon. Quigley's final game in the NRL came in 2006 in a 50–6 loss against Brisbane in the elimination semi final.

In 2007, Quigley joined the Catalans Dragons and played one season with the club. In March 2007 he was signed to French Super League club Catalans Dragons to replace the injured Aaron Gorrell.

Quigley last played in the Newcastle Rugby League for the Kurri Kurri Bulldogs.
