= Casey McGuire =

Australian rugby league footballer

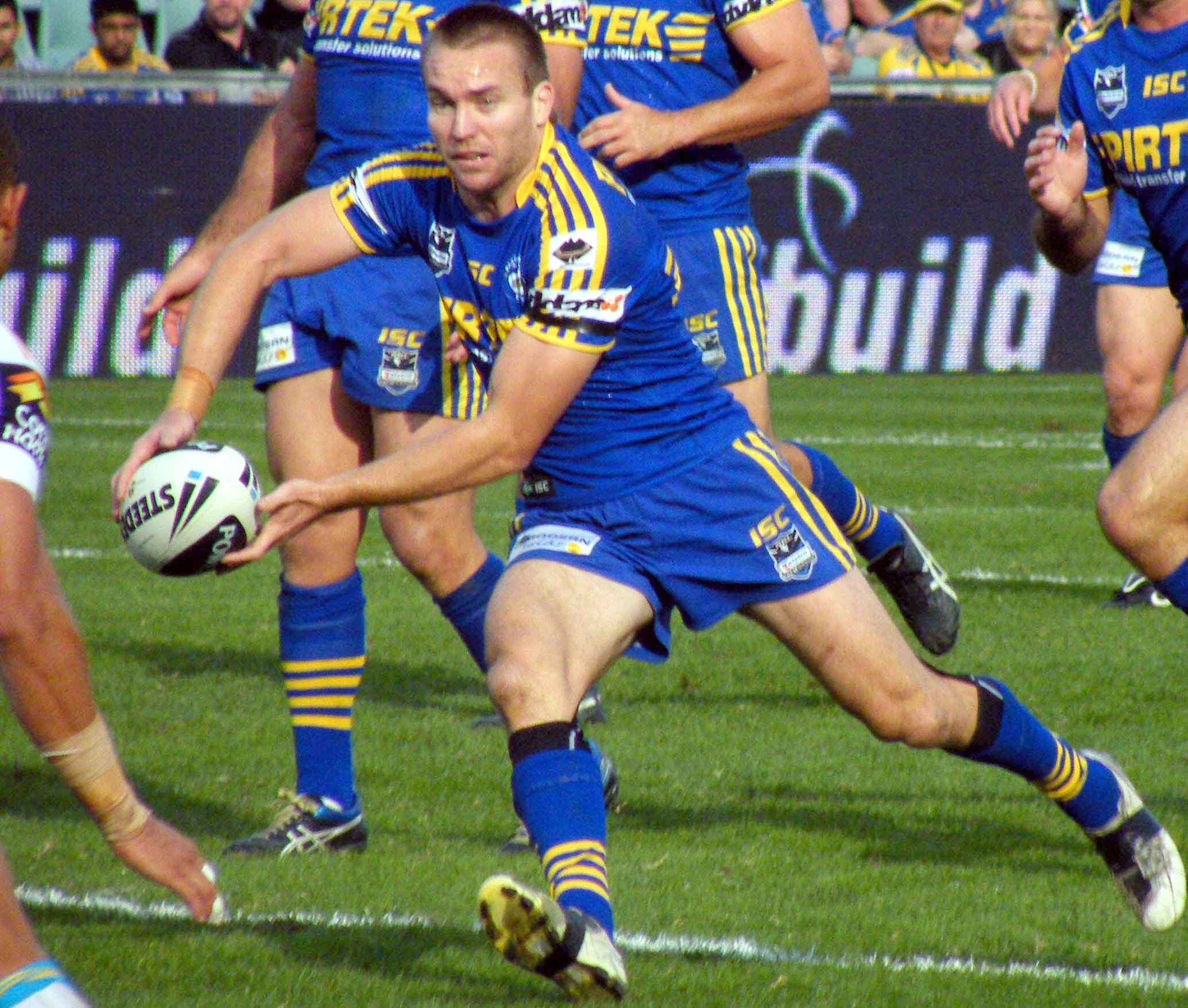

Personal information
- Full name: Casey Jon McGuire
- Born: 24 January 1980 (age 46) Nambour, Queensland, Australia

Playing information
- Height: 6 ft 0 in (184 cm)
- Weight: 14 st 7 lb (92 kg)
- Position: Hooker, Five-eighth, Halfback
Club
Years	Team	Pld	T	G	FG	P
1998	Parramatta Eels	2	0	0	0	0
2001–06	Brisbane Broncos	115	25	0	1	101
2007–10	Catalans Dragons	99	29	1	0	118
2011–12	Parramatta Eels	33	4	0	0	16
	Total	249	58	1	1	235
Representative
Years	Team	Pld	T	G	FG	P
2005	Queensland	2	0	0	0	0

Casey McGuire (born 24 January 1980) is an Australian former professional rugby league footballer. A State of Origin representative for Queensland and up and coming New South Wales debutante, he played his club football in the National Rugby League (NRL) for the Brisbane Broncos (with whom he won the 2006 NRL Premiership) and Parramatta Eels, as well as in the Super League for the Catalans Dragons.

== Early life ==
Born 24 January 1980 in Nambour, Queensland, McGuire was playing junior league for Caloundra Sharks & Kawana Dolphins. He then attended Caloundra State High QSSRL in 1997 when he was selected for the Australian Schoolboys rugby league team.

== Professional career ==
=== Parramatta Eels ===
McGuire made his NRL debut in round 22 of the 1998 season for the Parramatta Eels against Penrith at Penrith Park. The following week, he played in the club's 50–4 victory over Western Suburbs at Parramatta Stadium.

=== Brisbane Broncos ===
The next season, he returned to Queensland to play for the Brisbane Broncos. At Brisbane, he was a utility player, normally used in games from the bench. In the 2002 NRL season, he played in Brisbane's preliminary final defeat against eventual premiers the Sydney Roosters. McGuire subsequently played in the club's 2004 and 2005 finals campaigns.

McGuire played from the interchange bench in the 2006 NRL Grand Final victory over Melbourne at Telstra Stadium.

=== Queensland ===
He was selected for the Queensland Maroons in the 2005 State of Origin series playing off the bench for games 1 and 2.

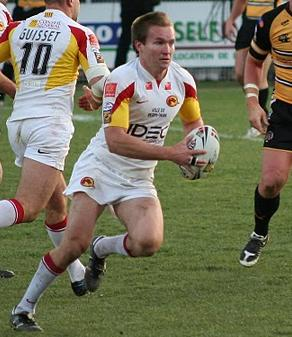
McGuire playing for Catalans in 2010

=== Super League ===
McGuire missed the Broncos' 2007 World Club Challenge appearance due to his move to France to play in the Super League for Catalans Dragons. Having initially started playing stand-off at Catalans Dragons, McGuire increasingly found himself playing at hooker and sharing much of the creative responsibilities with Adam Mogg and Thomas Bosc. had also been named in the France squad for the Four Nations tournament, qualifying under the three-year residency rule, but did not play.

=== Return to Australia ===
McGuire returned to Australia and the club where he made his NRL comeback with his first club, the Parramatta Eels for the 2011 season, playing as five-eighth. McGuire played 21 games in 2011 for Parramatta as the club narrowly avoided the wooden spoon.

A pectoral muscle injury during the 2012 NRL season put the remainder of McGuire's playing career in doubt. McGuire returned for Parramatta in their final game of the season which came against St. George Illawarra in round 26 at ANZ Stadium. It was also the final game for retiring Parramatta players Nathan Hindmarsh and Luke Burt. Parramatta would go on to lose the match 29-8 and the club finished last for the first time since 1972. The game was subsequently McGuire's last in the top grade.
