= Florian Quintilla =

French rugby league footballer

Personal information
- Full name: Florian Quintilla
- Born: 20 August 1988 (age 38) Narbonne, Aude, France

Playing information
- Height: 181 cm (5 ft 11 in)
- Weight: 92 kg (14 st 7 lb)
- Position: Second-row
Club
| Years | Team | Pld | T | G | FG | P |
|---|---|---|---|---|---|---|
| 2008–09 | Catalans Dragons | 6 | 0 | 0 | 0 | 0 |
| 2009 | Toulouse Olympique | 3 | 0 | 0 | 0 | 0 |
| 20??–?? | Lézignan Sangliers | | 0 | 0 | 0 | 0 |
| | Total | 9 | 0 | 0 | 0 | 0 |

Florian Quintilla (born 20 Augusta 1988) is a French former professional rugby league footballer. He played for Catalans Dragons in the Super League and for Toulouse Olympique in the Co-operative Championship. He is now playing for Lézignan Sangliers in the Elite One Championship.

He primarily plays in the second-row.

Quintilla named in the France training squad for the 2008 Rugby League World Cup. He was not selected to play.
