= Younes Khattabi =

Moroccan rugby league footballer

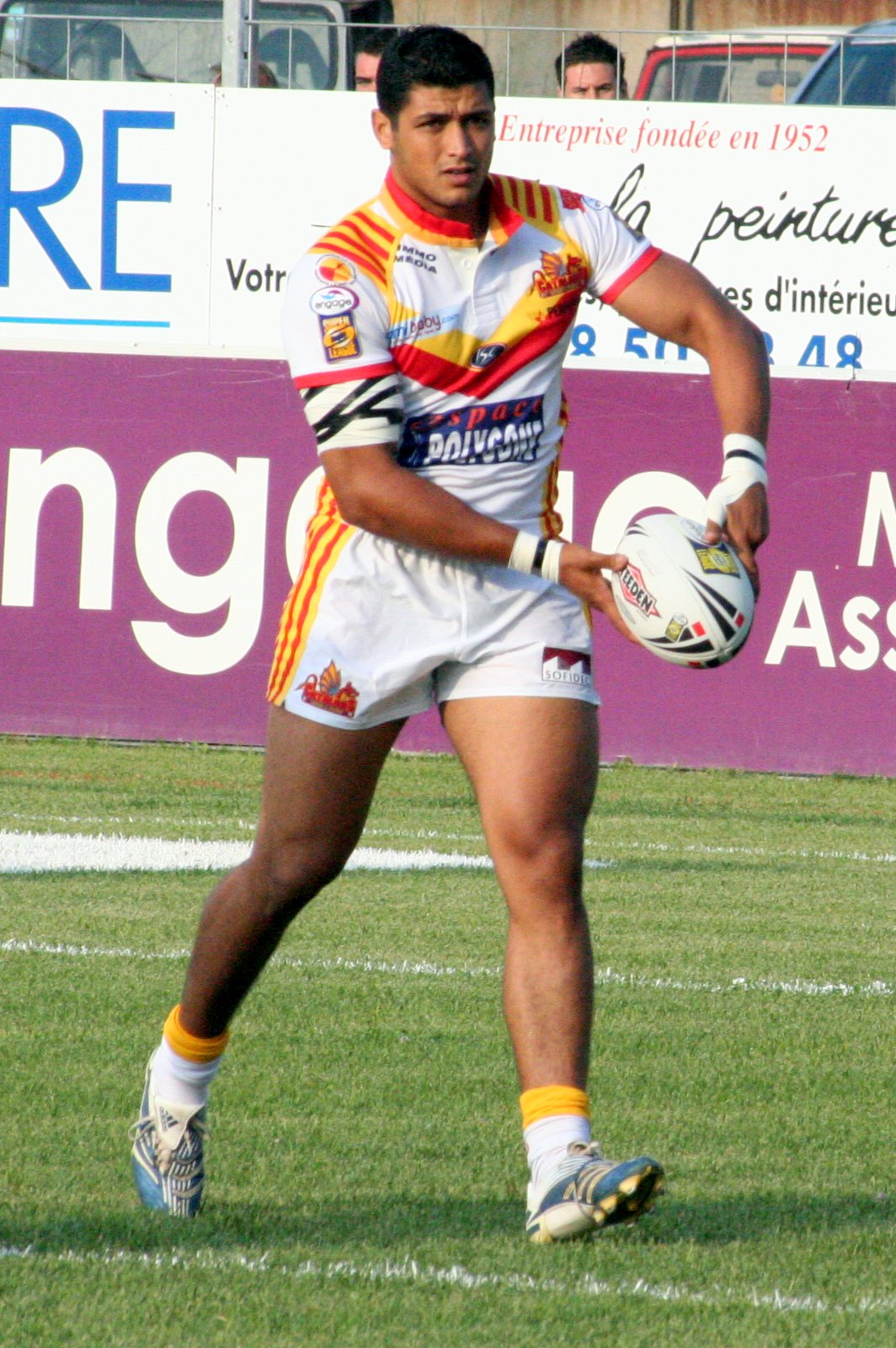

Personal information
- Born: 28 March 1984 (age 41) Rabat, Morocco

Playing information
- Height: 1.80 m (5 ft 11 in)
- Weight: 93 kg (14 st 9 lb)
- Position: Wing, Centre
Club
Years	Team	Pld	T	G	FG	P
2006–08	Catalans Dragons	32	11	0	0	44
2008–11	RC Carpentras XIII	36	23	0	0	92
2011–13	SO Avignon	33	13	0	0	52
2013	AS Carcassonne	12	7	0	0	28
–	US Entraigues XIII
	Total	113	54	0	0	216
Representative
Years	Team	Pld	T	G	FG	P
2008–13	France	2	0	0	0	0
2003–09	Morocco	2	3	0	0	12

Younes Khattabi (born 28 March 1984) is a Moroccan former rugby league footballer who last played as a wing or centre for US Entraigues XIII in the Elite 2. He previously played for SO Avignon and the Catalans Dragons in the Super League.

== Background ==
Khattabi was born in Rabat, Morocco.

== Career ==
=== Club ===
In the 2007 Challenge Cup Final against St. Helens, Khattabi scored the first try for the Catalans Dragons thus becoming the first Muslim to score a try at Wembley Stadium and the first Frenchman to score a try in a Challenge Cup final.

In 2018, Khattabi joined US Entraigues XIII. He made 15 appearances for the club before re-joining SO Avignon during the 2019–20 season. He returned to US Entraigues the following season.

In July 2022, Khattabi was elected as the president of SO Avignon. In January 2023, having retired from the running game, he announced his intention to play for the club's wheelchair rugby league team.

=== International ===
In 2003, Khattabi represented Morocco in the Mediterranean Cup scoring twice in their 58–4 win over Serbia. In 2009, he scored a try in a RLEF Euro Med Challenge match against Catalonia which Morocco won 29–6.

In June 2008, Khattabi represented France in a match against England. He played again for France at the 2013 Rugby League World Cup in the quarter-final match against England.
