= Aaron Gorrell =

Australian rugby league footballer

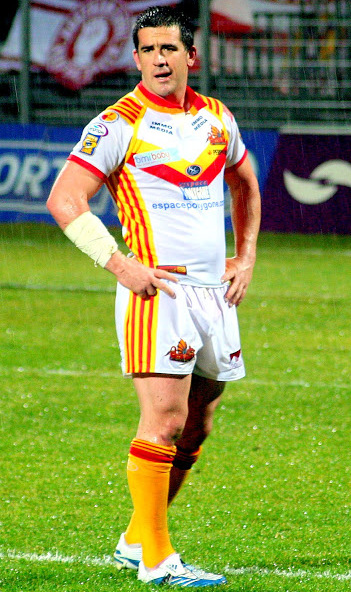

Personal information
- Born: 31 March 1981 (age 45) Wollongong, New South Wales, Australia

Playing information
- Height: 178 cm (5 ft 10 in)
- Weight: 88 kg (13 st 12 lb)
- Position: Hooker
Club
Years	Team	Pld	T	G	FG	P
2002–06	St. George Illawarra	48	7	94	0	216
2007–08	Catalans Dragons	24	6	14	0	42
2009	Brisbane Broncos	12	0	1	0	2
	Total	84	13	109	0	260
Representative
Years	Team	Pld	T	G	FG	P
2004	NSW Residents	1	1	0	0	4

Aaron Gorrell (born 31 March 1981) is an Australian former professional rugby league footballer who played as a hooker in the 2000s. He played for the St. George Illawarra Dragons and the Brisbane Broncos in the NRL, and for the Catalans Dragons in the Super League.

== Background ==
Gorrell was born in Wollongong, New South Wales, Australia.

== Playing career ==
Gorrell made his first grade debut for St. George Illawarra in round 5 of the 2002 NRL season against Parramatta which ended in a 20-all draw at WIN Stadium. Gorrell was made famous by slotting in the last-minute conversion in a round 15 of the 2006 NRL season game against the Brisbane Broncos at Suncorp Stadium. St. George won the match 18-16. Gorrell had converted rookie Brett Morris' try in the 78th minute after coach Nathan Brown gave him the goal-kicking duties after Mathew Head had kicked the last two conversions.

In 2007 he joined Catalans Dragons for their second season in the Super League. With his NRL experience he proved a key influence in the opening rounds of the season, before suffering a season-ending knee injury in round four which required a knee reconstruction. It was confirmed by the Brisbane Broncos on 27 September 2007 that Gorrell has signed with them for the 2009 season, where he will fill the vacancy left by the departing Michael Ennis.

Gorrell made his club debut for Brisbane in round 1 of the 2009 NRL season against North Queensland. He played a total of twelve games for the Brisbane club. Gorrell played for and coached the Queanbeyan Kangaroos in the Canberra Raiders cup between 2012 and 2017 but then moved into a full time coach role with the club in 2018.

== Career highlights ==
- Junior Club: Albion Park-Oak Flats
- First Grade Debut: Round 5, St George Illawarra v Parramatta, WIN Stadium, 14 April 2002
- First Grade Record: 2002 - 2006 8 tries & 94 goals
- Super League: 2007-2010 signing with Catalans Dragons
