= Jason Croker =

Australia international rugby league footballer

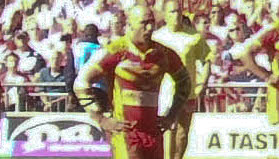

Personal information
- Born: 10 March 1973 (age 53) Crookwell, New South Wales, Australia

Playing information
- Height: 180 cm (5 ft 11 in)
- Weight: 100 kg (15 st 10 lb)
- Position: Second-row, Centre, Lock, Wing
Club
Years	Team	Pld	T	G	FG	P
1991–06	Canberra Raiders	318	120	1	0	482
2007–09	Catalans Dragons	62	12	0	1	49
	Total	380	132	1	1	531
Representative
Years	Team	Pld	T	G	FG	P
2000	Australia	5	2	0	0	8
1993–01	New South Wales	5	0	0	0	0
1994–01	NSW Country	3	0	0	0	0
- Relatives: Lachlan Croker (nephew); Millie Boyle (niece); Morgan Boyle (nephew); David Boyle (brother-in-law)

Jason Croker (born 10 March 1973) is an Australian former professional rugby league footballer. An Australian international and New South Wales State of Origin representative utility player, he previously played club football in the NRL for the Canberra Raiders, with whom he won the 1994 Winfield Cup and set club records for both highest total games and tries. Croker saw out his career with French Super League club Catalans Dragons.

Croker competed in and won the Gladiator Individual Sports Athletes Challenge in 1995.

== Playing career ==
=== Canberra ===
Croker was named the Canberra Raiders' rookie of the year in 1991 and he went on to play somewhat of a utility position over his long career, filling into many spots throughout his team. His 120 tries for Canberra was a club record until it was surpassed by Jarrod Croker and in 2000 he was named the Raiders' player of the year. He also gained selection in Australia's 2000 World Cup winning squad.

In 2006, Croker played his 300th game for Canberra, becoming the first to achieve this honour for the club.

In Croker's last game in Canberra he was given the keys to the city by Chief Minister Jon Stanhope in front of over 21,000 fans.

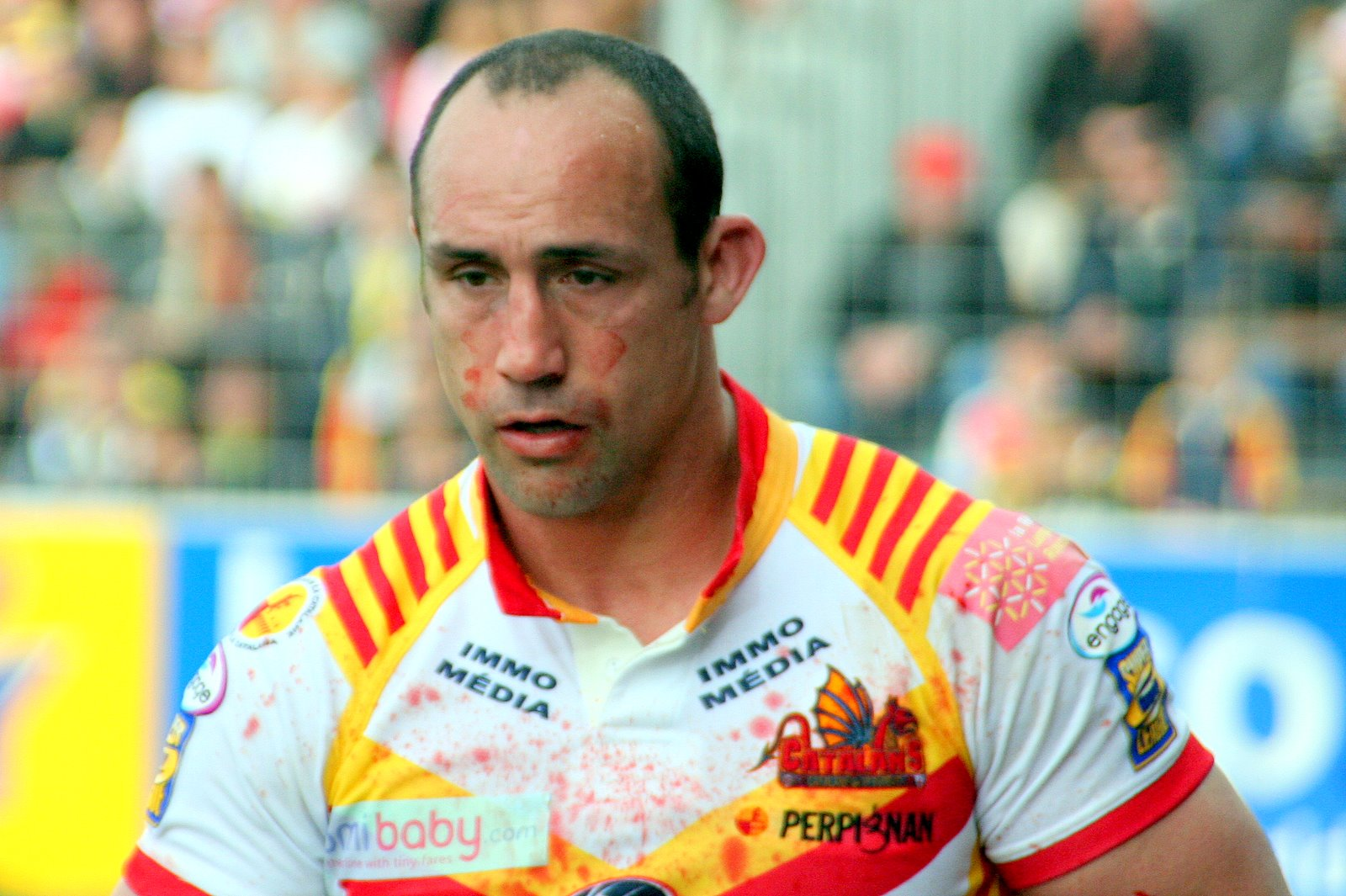
Croker playing with the Catalans Dragons in 2007

=== Catalans Dragons ===
Croker signed a two-year deal to play for the French team the Catalans Dragons from 2007, which, after two successful campaigns, was extended by a further year in 2008. Croker's experience was of increasing value to the fledgling French side, and his physical fitness and hunger for the game are admired by many. He is regarded fondly by many Catalans Dragons fans for an audacious drop-goal scored in a 29–22 win over the Bradford Bulls at Odsal in March 2007.

Croker was the oldest player in the Super League until retiring at the end of the 2009 season at age 36.

=== Return to Australia ===
He currently acts as a player-coach for the Gungahlin Bulls in the Canberra Raiders Cup. Croker was named in Canberra's 2016 NRL Auckland Nines squad.

=== Representative ===
- Country: Played two games for Country
- State of Origin: Played 5 games in total for New South Wales
- International: Played 4 tests for Australia in the 2000 World Cup
