= Julien Touxagas =

France international rugby league footballer

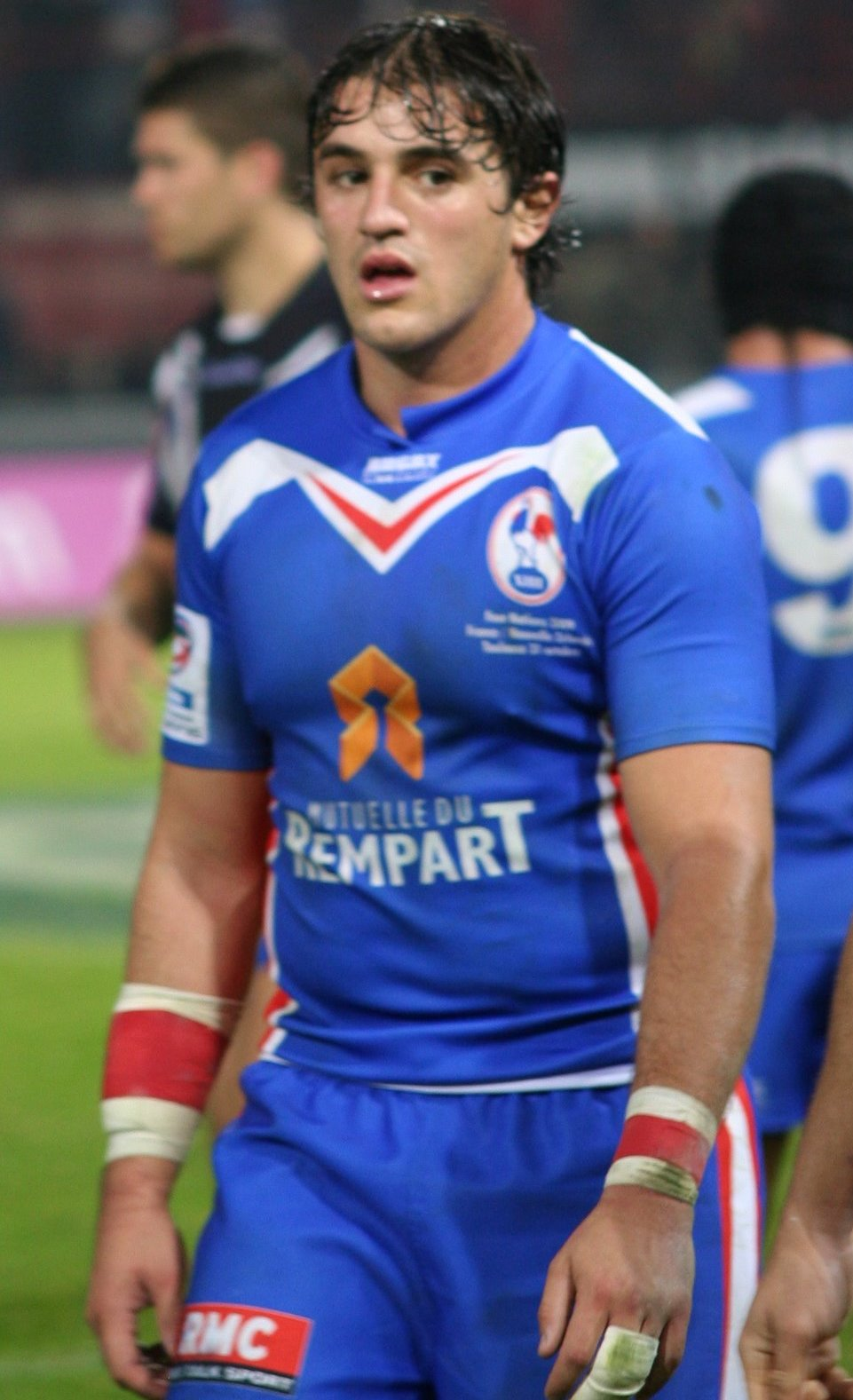

Personal information
- Born: 12 February 1984 (age 42) Perpignan, Pyrénées-Orientales, France
- Height: 1.85 m (6 ft 1 in)
- Weight: 100 kg (15 st 10 lb)

Playing information
- Position: Second-row, Loose forward, Centre
Club
Years	Team	Pld	T	G	FG	P
2006–11	Catalans Dragons	64	6	0	0	24
Representative
Years	Team	Pld	T	G	FG	P
2009–10	France	6	0	0	0	0
- Source: As of 10 Jun 2021

Julien Touxagas (born 12 February 1984 in Perpignan, France) is a French former professional rugby league footballer. He most recently played for the Catalans Dragons in the Super League competition.

== Career ==
Touxagas position of choice was Second-row, although he had also featured at loose forward. He fell out of favour at Les Catalans at the back end of 2007, a year in which he appeared in the Challenge Cup Final at Wembley Stadium. During 2008, he forced his way back into the side, making a number of appearances and notably scoring a 90-metre try in Cardiff, against Harlequins RL

He was named in the France training squad for the 2008 Rugby League World Cup. Touxagas continued to represent France in the 2009 Four Nations tournament.
