= Cyrille Gossard =

France international rugby league footballer

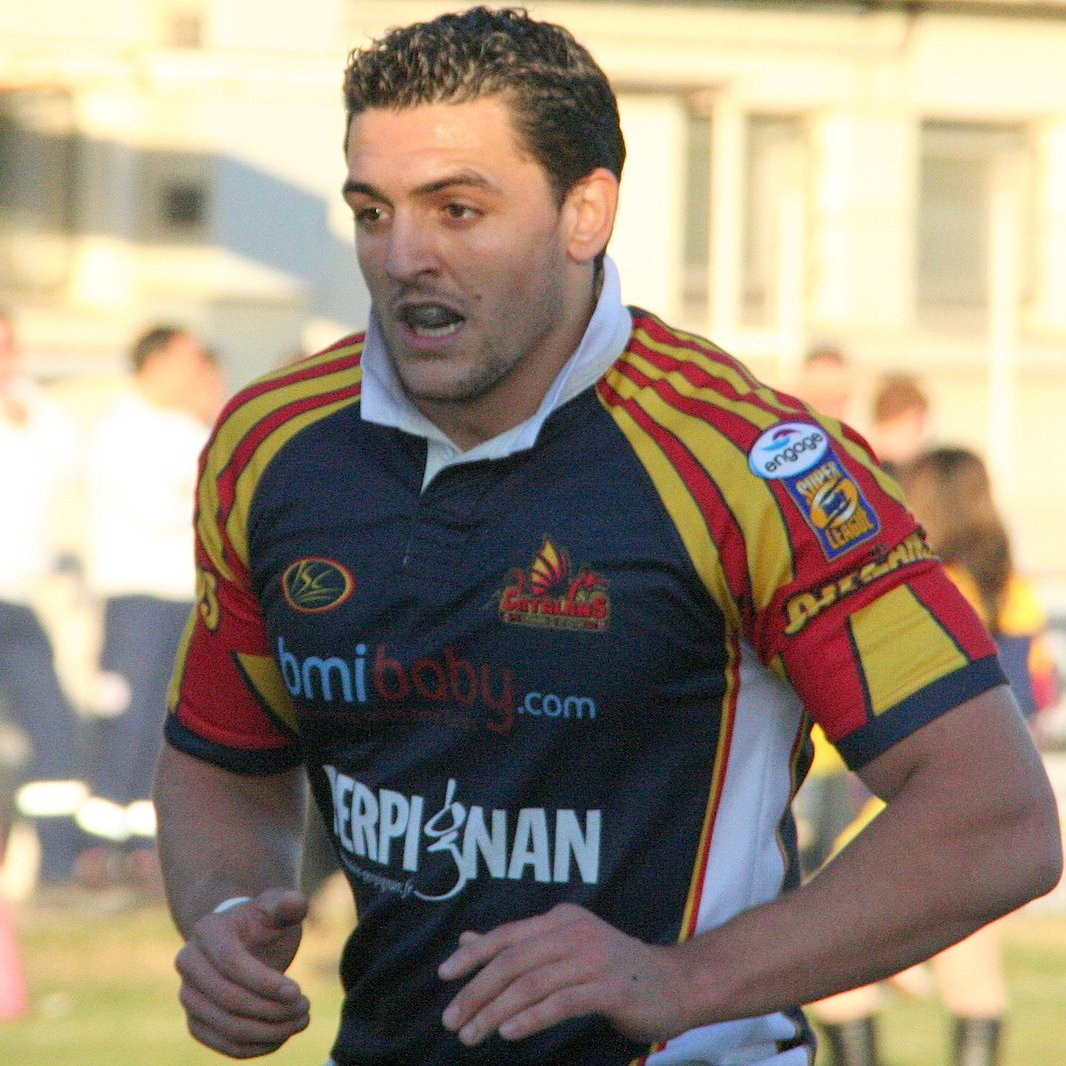

Personal information
- Full name: Cyrille Gossard
- Born: 7 February 1982 (age 44) Perpignan, Languedoc-Roussillon, France
- Height: 1.87 m (6 ft 2 in)
- Weight: 104 kg (16 st 5 lb)

Playing information
- Position: Second-row
Club
Years	Team	Pld	T	G	FG	P
2006–12	Catalans Dragons	93	9	0	0	36
Representative
Years	Team	Pld	T	G	FG	P
2007–11	France	9	1	0	0	4
- Source: As of 2 November 2022

Cyril Gossard (born 7 February 1982) is a rugby league footballer who most recently played for the Catalans Dragons in the Super League. He plays as a second-row.

== Background ==
Gossard was born in France.

== Career ==
Gossard made 93 appearances for Catalans between 2006 and 2012. In 2014, he became the head coach of St Esteve XIII Catalan. On 13 November 2015, Gossard stepped down as head coach of St Esteve XIII Catalan for personal reasons.
