= Jérôme Guisset =

France international rugby league & union footballer

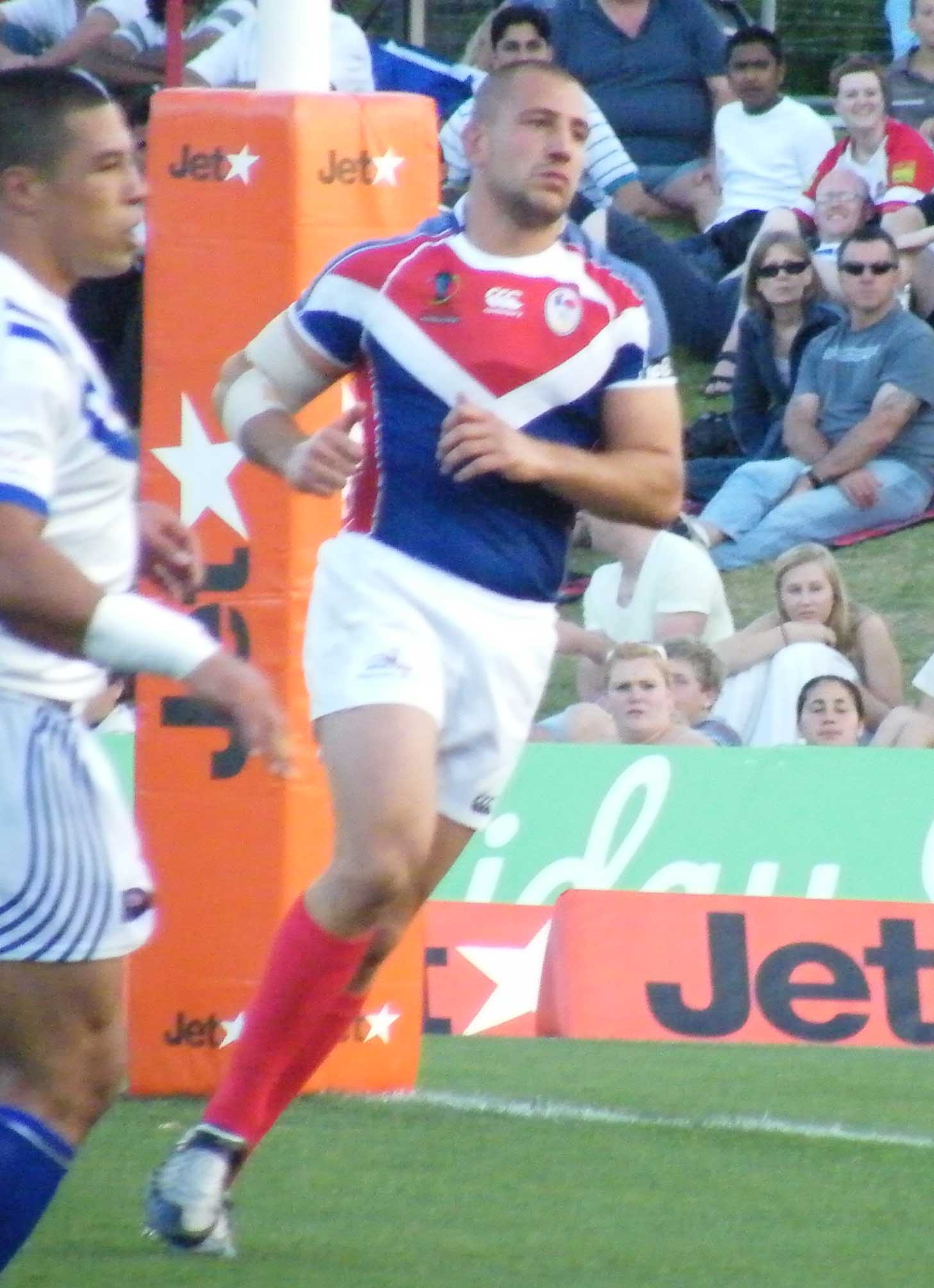

Personal information
- Born: 19 August 1978 (age 48) Perpignan, France
- Height: 1.85 m (6 ft 1 in)
- Weight: 100 kg (15 st 10 lb)

Playing information

Rugby league
- Position: Prop, Second-row
Club
Years	Team	Pld	T	G	FG	P
	AS Saint Estève
1999	Canberra Raiders	4	0	0	0	0
2000–04	Warrington Wolves	137	25	0	0	100
2005	Wigan Warriors	25	3	0	0	12
2006–10	Catalans Dragons	141	11	0	1	45
	Total	307	39	0	1	157
Representative
Years	Team	Pld	T	G	FG	P
1997–2009	France	28	9	0	0	36
	France 9s

Rugby union
Club
Years	Team	Pld	T	G	FG	P
2005	CA Brive	22	2	1	0	12
- Source: As of 15 January 2021

Jérôme Guisset (born 29 October 1978) is a French former professional rugby league footballer. He most recently played for the Catalans Dragons as prop or second-row, and is now the assistant coach at the club.

== Playing career ==
He started his career with AS Saint Estève, then as a 16-year-old centre with the Canberra Raiders in the National Rugby League, where he played five times for the first grade, before bulking up and moving up to the front row. He was part of the 1997 and 1998 French senior championship-winning St Estève sides.

In 1999 Guisset played a season with Australian National Rugby League club, the Canberra Raiders.

From 2000, Guisset spent four seasons with Warrington, making 124 appearances, but he left at the end of 2004 when he was not offered a new deal. He spent some time in 2005 playing rugby union for CA Brive, and toured with the France rugby sevens squad in New Zealand and the United States.

At the start of the 2005 season, Guisset signed for Wigan after a career-ending injury to newly-signed prop Luke Davico. Jerome made 25 appearances for Wigan in 2005 and was one of the most consistent performers in an injury-ravaged season.

Midway through 2005, Guisset agreed a deal to join Catalans Dragons for their debut season in 2006 and, in September, Wigan confirmed that he would be released from the second year of his contract. In May 2008, he signed a two-year contract extension with the Dragons, and retired at the end of the 2010 season.

=== International ===
Guisset debuted for France in a draw with Ireland national rugby league team, and played in every game of the 2000 Rugby League World Cup, which France jointly hosted.. In 2008, he was selected in the pre-tournament training squad for the 2008 World Cup, before being selected for the final France squad.
