= David Ferriol =

France international rugby league footballer

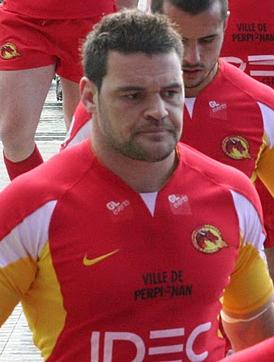

Personal information
- Born: 24 April 1979 (age 47) Carcassonne, France
- Height: 1.90 m (6 ft 3 in)
- Weight: 107 kg (16 st 12 lb)

Playing information
- Position: Prop
Club
Years	Team	Pld	T	G	FG	P
2005	Limoux Grizzlies	2	0	0	0	0
2007–12	Catalans Dragons	144	10	0	0	40
	Total	146	10	0	0	40
Representative
Years	Team	Pld	T	G	FG	P
2004–11	France	17	3	0	0	12
- Source: As of 3 October 2017

David Ferriol (born 24 April 1979) is a French former professional rugby league footballer. He previously played for the Catalans Dragons club in the Super League.

== Background ==
Ferriol was born in Carcassonne, France.

== Career ==
A powerful, ball-carrying prop forward, Ferriol made his Catalans debut in the 2007 season and quickly became a crowd favourite amongst the Dragons faithful. He had previously played for the Limoux Grizzlies in the French Elite Championship.
