= Thomas Bosc =

France international rugby league footballer

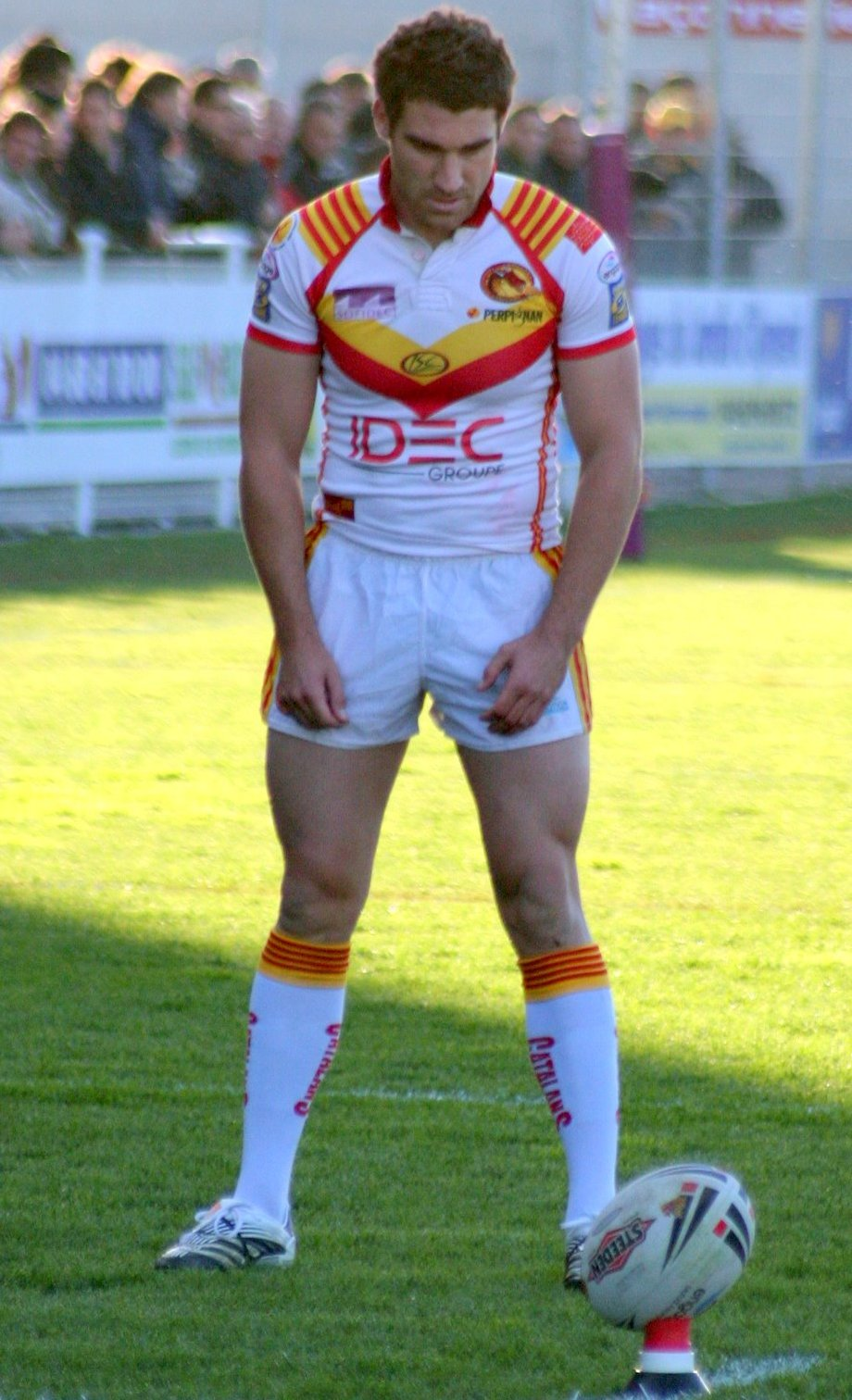

Personal information
- Born: 5 August 1983 (age 43) Perpignan, Pyrénées-Orientales, Occitania, France

Playing information
- Height: 182 cm (6 ft 0 in)
- Weight: 90 kg (14 st 2 lb)
- Position: Stand-off, Scrum-half, Fullback
Club
| Years | Team | Pld | T | G | FG | P |
|---|---|---|---|---|---|---|
| 2006–17 | Catalans Dragons | 243 | 60 | 562 | 14 | 1374 |
Representative
| Years | Team | Pld | T | G | FG | P |
| 2005–13 | France | 27 | 6 | 45 | 0 | 110 |

Thomas Bosc (born 5 August 1983) is a French former professional rugby league footballer who played for the Catalans Dragons in the Super League. Having spent his entire professional career with the Dragons, he is the club's all-time leading points scorer and is considered one of the finest French players to have played for the club.

== Background ==
Bosc was born in Perpignan, Languedoc-Roussillon, France. His father is Jean-Marie Bosc, who is a former rugby league international for France, who played the 1975 Rugby League World Championship.

== Playing career ==
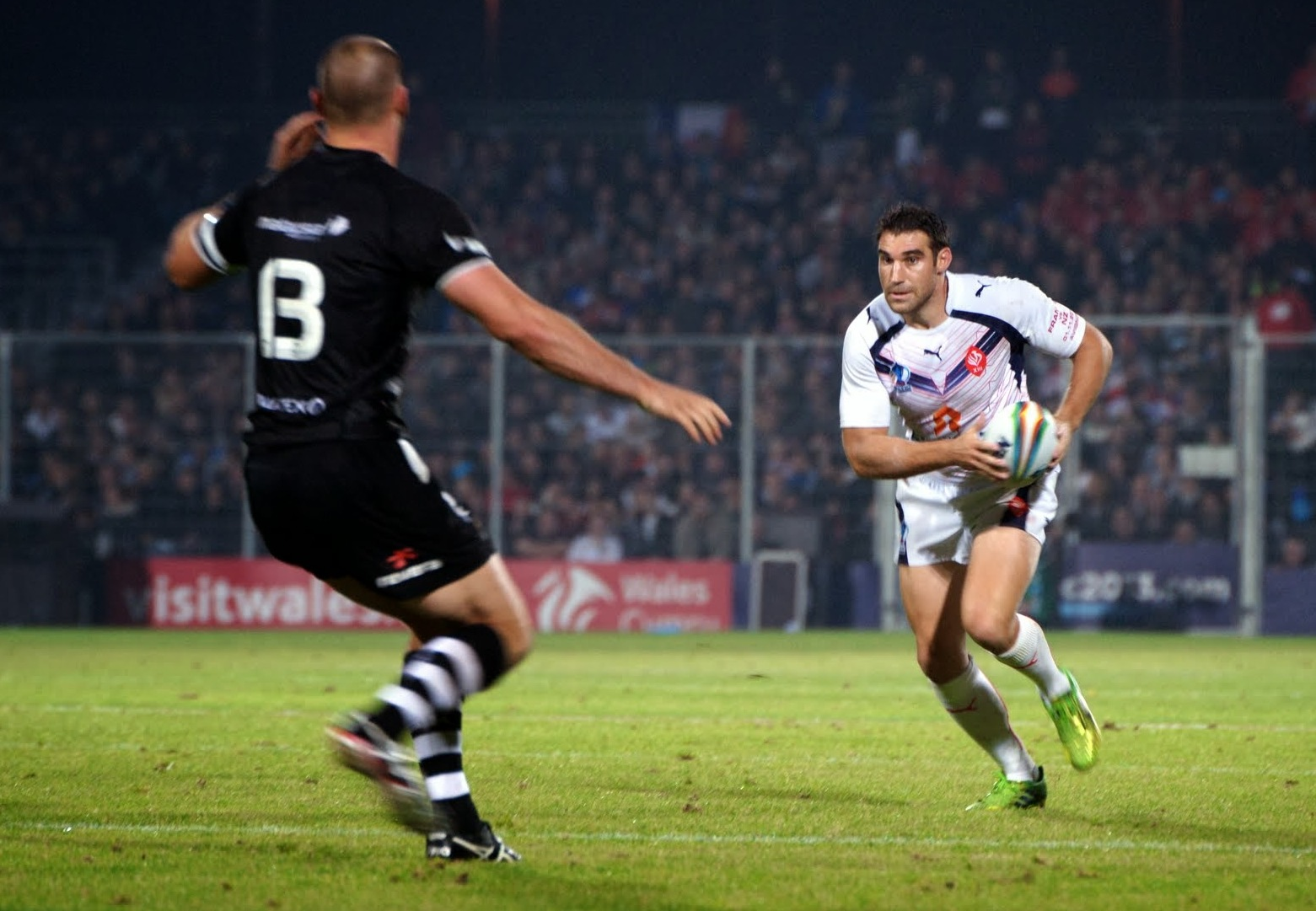
Bosc playing for France in the 2013 Rugby League World Cup

After coming through the ranks at Elite One Championship side Union Treiziste Catalane (the precursor to Catalans Dragons), Bosc was part of the Dragons' inaugural Super League squad and made his Super League debut against Castleford Tigers on 26 February 2006, in what was only the club's third Super League match. He spent most of 2006 as a fringe player, occasionally called upon to play at full-back. In 2007, with the arrival of Clint Greenshields, he was switched to the wing and enjoyed a successful campaign, albeit one curtailed by injury. With the retirement of Stacey Jones in 2008, Bosc was handed the opportunity to fill his considerable gap in the halves. He was a revelation in the role and went on to become a key player for the team, taking over the playmaking and goal-kicking responsibilities and setting a number of points-scoring records including becoming the first player to reach 1,000 points for the club.

He was named in the France training squad and ultimately to the final France squad for the 2008 Rugby League World Cup.

Bosc continued to represent France in the 2009 Four Nations and the 2013 Rugby League World Cup.

In September 2017, Bosc announced he would be retiring at the end of the season.
