= Adam Mogg =

Australian rugby league footballer

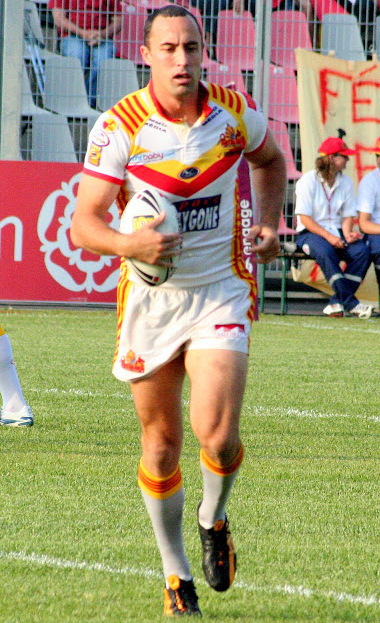

Personal information
- Born: 31 July 1977 (age 49) Toowoomba, Queensland, Australia

Playing information
- Height: 185 cm (6 ft 1 in)
- Weight: 94 kg (14 st 11 lb)
- Position: Centre, Five-eighth, Wing
Club
Years	Team	Pld	T	G	FG	P
2002	Parramatta Eels	9	2	0	0	8
2003–06	Canberra Raiders	81	37	0	0	148
2007–10	Catalans Dragons	84	25	0	1	101
2010	Canberra Raiders	15	1	0	0	4
	Total	189	65	0	1	261
Representative
Years	Team	Pld	T	G	FG	P
2006	Queensland	2	3	0	0	12

Coaching information
Club
Years	Team	Gms	W	D	L	W%
2016–19	Redcliffe Dolphins	101	68	1	32	67

Adam Mogg (born 31 July 1977) is an Australian former professional rugby league footballer who played in the 2000s. A Queensland State of Origin representative centre, he played in the National Rugby League (NRL) for Australian clubs the Canberra Raiders and Parramatta Eels, as well as in the Super League for French club the Catalans Dragons.

== Background ==
Mogg was born in Toowoomba, Queensland, Australia.

== Playing career ==
Mogg spent five years with the Redcliffe Dolphins, participating in four grand finals in the Queensland Cup and winning the club's player of the year award in 2001, before being scouted in 2002 by the Parramatta Eels. Mogg made his first grade debut for Parramatta in round 10 of the 2002 NRL season against Melbourne at Olympic Park.

In the 2003 season, the Canberra Raiders picked him up and he became a regular member of the squad.

Normally a centre, Mogg was selected as a wing for Queensland for games II and III of the 2006 State of Origin series; he was included after Greg Inglis was replaced due to injury. Mogg scored two tries on his Origin debut and a further try in game III. He was one of the oldest players to make an Origin debut.

Mogg was selected to play for Catalans at stand-off in the 2007 Challenge Cup Final in which the Dragons were defeated by St. Helens 30–8. He was selected at centre in the 2007 season's Super League Dream Team. The Queenslander grew in confidence in 2008, and in May 2008 signed a contract extension which tied him to the Dragons until 2011. In Perpignan he played the majority of his rugby at centre, but also played at stand-off.

On 22 March 2010 it was announced that Mogg had been released from his contract and would rejoin Canberra Raiders.

Mogg retired from the game at the end of 2010, scoring only one try for the season.

== Coaching career ==
Mogg coached the Sunshine Coast Sea Eagles in the 2011 Queensland Cup. He was then involved with the Redcliffe Dolphins, before being signed by former teammate Andrew McFadden as an assistant coach for the New Zealand Warriors.

On 21 October 2021, it was reported that Mogg would leave the Redcliffe Dolphins, after six seasons in charge as head-coach.

== Career highlights ==
- First Grade Debut - 2002, round 10 Parramatta v Melbourne Storm, Olympic Park, 18 May
- Representative Selection - 2006, two games for the Queensland Maroons, scoring three tries
