= 2021 Catalans Dragons season =

English rugby league season

2021 Catalans Dragons Season
- Super League XXVI Rank: 4
- Play-off result: TBA
- Challenge Cup: Quarter-final (lost 6-16 to Warrington)
- 2021 record: Wins: 5; draws: 0; losses: 2
- Points scored: For: 137; against: 86

Team information
- Chairman: Bernard Guasch
- Head Coach: Steve McNamara
- Captain: Benjamin Garcia
- Stadium: Stade Gilbert Brutus; Perpignan, France

Top scorers
- Tries: Fouad Yaha (5)
- Goals: James Maloney (21) +1 Drop Goal
- Points: Maloney (47)
← 2020	List of seasons	2022 →

This article details the Catalans Dragons rugby league football club's 2021 season. During the season, they will compete in the Super League XXVI and the 2021 Challenge Cup.

== Pre Season ==
Date and time	Versus	H/A	Venue	Result	Score	Tries	Goals	Attendance	TV	Report
6 March, 15:00	French Elite 1 (Note: This team was made up of French players from across the Elite 1 Championship)	A	Stade Aimé Giral	W	50–18	Davies (2), Séguier, S.Tomkins, McMeeken, Brochon, Dezaria, Franco, Le Cam	Maloney (4), Mourgue (3)	—N/a (Note: Played behind closed doors due to the COVID-19 pandemic)	—N/a.	
13 March, 15:00	Toulouse Olympique	H	Stade Gilbert Brutus	W	40–28	Drinkwater, Yaya (3), Whitley, Bousquet, Goudemand	Maloney (6)	—N/a	—N/a.	

== Super League ==
Win Draw Loss Postponed/Cancelled/Expunged

- All fixtures are subject to change

Date and time	Round	Versus	H/A	Venue	Result	Score	Tries	Goals	Attendance	TV	Report
27 March, 18:15	1	Hull KR	N	Emerald Headingley	W	29–28 (Note: After golden-point extra time)	Yaha (2), Whitley, Laguerre, Garcia	Maloney (4), Maloney DG	—N/a. (Note: Played behind closed doors due to the COVID-19 pandemic)	Sky Sports	report
3 April, 14:30	2	Huddersfield Giants	N	Totally Wicked Stadium	W	20-10	Whitley, Garcia, McMeeken	Maloney (2), Tomkins	—N/a.	Sky Sports	report
17 April, 16:45	3	Salford Red Devils	H	Stade Gilbert Brutus	W	42-6	Garcia, Langi, Drinkwater, Yaha (3), Davies	Maloney (7)	—N/a.	Sky Sports	

== League table ==
Pos	Team	Pld	W	D	L	PF	PA	PP	Pts	PCT	Qualification (Note: Teams must have played at least 70% of scheduled fixtures to qualify for the play-offs.)
1	Catalans Dragons (L)	23	19	0	4	688	398	172.9	38	82.61	Semi-final
2	St. Helens (C)	21	16	0	5	548	229	239.3	32	76.19	Semi-final
3	Warrington Wolves	21	15	1	5	588	354	166.1	31	73.81	Elimination Semi-finals
4	Wigan Warriors	25	15	0	10	387	385	100.5	30	60.00	Elimination Semi-finals
5	Leeds Rhinos	24	13	0	11	556	440	126.4	26	54.17	Elimination Semi-finals
6	Hull Kingston Rovers	20	10	0	10	497	458	108.5	20	50.00	Elimination Semi-finals
7	Castleford Tigers	23	11	0	12	437	552	79.2	22	47.83	
8	Hull FC	21	8	1	12	409	476	85.9	17	40.48	
9	Huddersfield Giants	24	9	0	15	460	516	89.1	18	37.50	
10	Wakefield Trinity	24	9	0	15	482	548	88.0	18	37.50	
11	Salford Red Devils	22	7	0	15	402	584	68.8	14	31.82	
12	Leigh Centurions (R)	22	2	0	20	356	870	40.9	4	9.09	Relegated to the Championship

Rules for classification: 1) win percentage; 2) points scored percentage (points scored divided by points conceded).
(C) Champions; (L) League Leaders' Shield Winners; (R) Relegated

== Player statistics ==
#	Player	Position	Tries	Goals	Drop Goals	Points
1	Arthur Mourgue	Fullback	0	0	0	0
2	Tom Davies	Wing	0	0	0	0
3	Samisoni Langi	Centre	0	0	0	0
4	Dean Whare	Centre	0	0	0	0
5	Fouad Yaha	Wing	2	0	0	8
6	James Maloney	Stand-off	0	7	1	15
7	Josh Drinkwater	Scrum-half	0	0	0	0
8	Gil Dudson	Prop	0	0	0	0
9	Michael McIlorum	Hooker	0	0	0	0
10	Julian Bousquet	Prop	0	0	0	0
11	Matt Whitley	Second-row	2	0	0	8
12	Mike McMeeken	Second-row	1	0	0	4
13	Benjamin Garcia	Centre	2	0	0	8
14	Alrix Da Costa	Prop	0	0	0	0
15	Benjamin Julien	Prop	0	0	0	0
16	Paul Séguier	Prop	0	0	0	0
17	Mickael Goudemand	Second-row	0	0	0	0
18	Lambert Belmas	Second-row	0	0	0	0
19	Arthur Romano	Centre	0	0	0	0
20	Mathieu Laguerre	Centre	0	0	0	0
21	Correntin Le Cam	Second-row	0	0	0	0
22	Joel Tomkins	Second-row	0	0	0	0
23	Mathieu Cozza	Prop	0	0	0	0
24	Jason Baitieri	Loose forward	0	0	0	0
28	Sam Kasiano	Prop	0	0	0	0
29	Sam Tomkins	Fullback	0	1	0	2
30	Jordan Dezaria	Second-row	0	0	0	0

- As of 3 May 2021

== 2021 transfers ==
=== Gains ===
Player	Club	Contract	Date
(Wales) Gil Dudson	Salford Red Devils	2 Years	March 2020
(England) Mike McMeeken	Castleford Tigers	3 Years	June 2020
(New Zealand) Dean Whare	Penrith Panthers	2 Years	February 2021

=== Losses ===
Player	Club	Contract	Date
(France) Antoni Maria	FC Lézignan	1 Year	July 2020
(Tonga) Sam Moa	FC Lézignan	1 Year	November 2020
(France) Mickaël Simon	AS Carcassonne		November 2020
(Papua New Guinea) David Mead	Brisbane Broncos	2 Years	November 2020
(France) Remi Casty	Released	N/A	November 2020
(France) Lucas Albert	AS Carcassonne	1 Year	November 2020
(France) Gavin Marguerite	Villeneuve Leopards	1 Year	December 2020
(Scotland) Lewis Tierney	Leigh Centurions	2 Years	December 2020

== 2021 squad ==
2021 Catalans Dragons Squad
First team squad		Coaching staff
1 (France) Arthur Mourgue – FB, SH, SO; 2 (England) Tom Davies – WG; 3 (Tonga) Samisoni Langi – CE, SO; 4 (New Zealand) Dean Whare – CE; 5 (France) Fouad Yaha – WG; 6 (Australia) James Maloney – SH, SO; 7 (England) Josh Drinkwater – SH, SO; 8 (Wales) Gil Dudson – PR; 9 (England) Michael McIlorum – HK; 10 (France) Julian Bousquet – PR; 11 (England) Matt Whitley – SR; 12 (England) Mike McMeeken – SR; 13 (France) Benjamin Garcia (c) – SR	14 (France) Alrix Da Costa – HK; 15 (France) Benjamin Julien – SR, PR; 16 (France) Paul Séguier – PR; 17 (France) Mickael Goudemand – SR, LF; 18 (France) Lambert Belmas – PR; 19 (France) Arthur Romano – CE, WG; 20 Mathieu Laguerre; 21 Corentin Le Cam; 22 (England) Joel Tomkins – SR; 23 Mathieu Cozza; 24 (France) Jason Baitieri – LF; 28 (New Zealand) Sam Kasiano – PR; 29 (England) Sam Tomkins – FB, SH	Head coach: (England) Steve McNamara; Assistant coach: (France) Thomas Bosc; Legend: (c) Captain(s); (vc) Vice-captain(s); Updated: 3 March 2021; Source(s): 2021 Squad Numbers
