= 2020 Catalans Dragons season =

- Super League Rank: 4
- Challenge Cup: Quarter-final (lost to Salford Red Devils 18-22)
- 2020 record: Wins: 9; draws: 0; losses: 6
- Points scored: For: 376; against: 259

Team information
- CEO: Bernard Guasch
- Head Coach: Steve McNamara
- Captain: Rémi Casty
- Stadium: Stade Gilbert Brutus; Perpignan, France
- Avg. attendance: 6,674
- Agg. attendance: 40,044
- High attendance: 8,886
- Low attendance: 5,000 (Note: French Covid restrictions allow spectators to attend Catalans home games with the total crowd limited to 5,000.)

Top scorers
- Tries: Tom Davies (12)
- Goals: James Maloney (56)
- Points: James Maloney (120)
← 2019	List of seasons	2021 →

This article details the Catalans Dragons's rugby league football club's 2020 season.

== Fixtures and results ==
Win Loss

- All fixtures are subject to change

=== Challenge Cup ===
Date and time	Rnd	Versus	H/A	Venue	Result	Score	Tries	Goals	TV	Report
22 August 2020, 14:30	6	Castleford Tigers	N	John Smiths Stadium	W	36-24	Mead (3), Yaha, Garcia, Whitley	Maloney (6)	BBC One	
18 September 2020, 18:00	QF	Salford Red Devils	N	Totally Wicked Stadium	L	18–22 (Note: After golden-point extra time)	Yaha, Maloney, Whitley	Maloney (3)	BBC One	

=== Regular season ===
Date and time	Rnd	Versus	H/A	Venue	Result	Score	Tries	Goals	Attendance	TV	Report
1 February, 17:00	1	Huddersfield Giants	H	Stade Gilbert Brutus	L	12–32	S. Tomkins, Yaha	Maloney (2)	8,254	—N/a	Report
C–C (Note: Match cancelled after Super League meeting on 3 November rescheduled the play-offs and ended the regular season early.)	2	Wakefield Trinity									
15 February, 17:00	3	Castleford Tigers	H	Stade Gilbert Brutus	W	38–16	Tomkins (3), Folau, Langi, Yaha	Maloney (6)	8,886	—N/a	Report
2 August 2020, 16:15 (Note: Match postponed on original date, Due to St Helens' involvement in the WCC)	4	St. Helens	A	Emerald Headingley (Note: Until further notice, all games will resume Behind closed doors, at neutral venues due to the COVID-19 pandemic in the United Kingdom)	L	6–34	Maloney	Maloney	0 (Note: Match played behind closed doors)	Sky Sports	Report
1 March, 15:00	5	Hull F.C.	A	KCOM Stadium	W	34–29	Jullien (2), Yaha, Drinkwater, Langi, Maloney	Maloney (5)	12,003	—N/a	Report
7 March, 17:00	6	Salford Red Devils	H	Stade Gilbert Brutus	W	30–12	McIlorum, Whitley (2), Yaha, Tierney	Maloney (5)	7,904	—N/a	
C–C	7	Leeds Rhinos									
8 August 2020, 16:15	8	Castleford Tigers	N	Emerald Headingley	W	40–14	Davies (2), Da Costa, Folau, Garcia, J.Tomkins, Baitieri	Maloney (6)	0	Sky Sports	
8 August 2020, 16:15	9	Wakefield Trinity (Note: Wakefield were scheduled to play St Helens, but due to Salford's game being postponed, they will now play Catalans.)	N	Totally Wicked Stadium	W	58–0	Whitley (3), Langi (2), Davies (3), Bousquet, Yaha	Maloney (7), S Tomkins (2)	0	Sky Sports	
C–C	10	Wigan Warriors									
12 September 2020, 17:00	12	Wigan Warriors	H	Stade Gilbert Brutus	L	12–28	Yaha, Bousquet	Maloney (2)	5,000	Sky Sports	
25 September 2020, 17:00	13	Warrington Wolves	A	Halliwell Jones Stadium	L	16–36	Davies, Langi, Yaha	Maloney (2)	0	Sky Sports	
30 September 2020, 18:00	14	Leeds Rhinos	A	Emerald Headingley	W	34–6	Davies (3), Yaha (2), Mourgue	Maloney (5)	0	Sky Sports	
4 October 2020, 18:00	15	Wakefield Trinity	H	Stade Gilbert Brutus	W	40–8	Whitley, Folau, Mead (2), Kasiano, S.Tomkins, Bousquet	Maloney (6)	5,000	Sky Sports	
9 October 2020, 18:00	16	Hull KR	H	Stade Gilbert Brutus	W	34–4	J.Tomkins (3), Garcia, Davies (2), Folau,	Maloney (5)	5,000	Sky Sports	
C–C	17	Warrington Wolves									
C–C	18	St Helens									

=== Play-offs ===
Date and time	Rnd	Versus	H/A	Venue	Result	Score	Tries	Goals	TV	Report
13 November 2020, 19:45	Eliminator play-off	Leeds Rhinos	A	Halliwell Jones Stadium	W	26–14	Davies, Folau, Langi, Mead	Maloney (5)	Sky Sports	
20 November 2020, 19:45	Semi Final	st Helens	A	Totally Wicked Stadium					Sky Sports	

== League standings ==
Pos	Team	Pld	W	D	L	PF	PA	PP	Pts	PCT	Qualification (Note: Where teams have the same win percentage, position is decided by points scored percentage (points scored divided by points conceded).)
1	Wigan Warriors (L)	17	13	0	4	408	278	146.8	26	76.47	Semi-finals
2	St Helens (C)	17	12	0	5	469	195	240.5	24	70.59	Semi-finals
3	Warrington Wolves (Note: Salford forfeited a game against Warrington. Under RFL operational rules, the game is recorded as a 24–0 victory for Warrington and converse loss for Salford with the points scored/conceded applying to both teams.)	17	12	0	5	365	204	178.9	24	70.59	Elimination semi-finals
4	Catalans Dragons	13	8	0	5	376	259	145.2	16	61.54	Elimination semi-finals
5	Leeds Rhinos	17	10	0	7	369	390	94.6	20	58.82	Elimination semi-finals
6	Hull F.C.	17	9	0	8	405	436	92.9	18	52.94	Elimination semi-finals
7	Huddersfield Giants (Note: Huddersfield were placed on standby to take the place of any of the four teams in the elimination finals should one be unable to fulfil their fixture.)	18	7	0	11	318	367	86.6	14	38.89	
8	Castleford Tigers	16	6	0	10	328	379	86.5	12	37.50	
9	Salford Red Devils	18	8	0	10	354	469	75.5	10 (Note: Salford deducted 3 wins by the Rugby Football League for failing to meet the terms of a financial commitment agreed in 2013.)	27.78	
10	Wakefield Trinity	19	5	0	14	324	503	64.4	10	26.32	
11	Hull Kingston Rovers	17	3	0	14	290	526	55.1	6	17.65	

Source: BBC Sport
Rules for classification: 1) Points; 2) Points difference; 3) Number of points scored;
(C) Champions; (L) League Leaders' Shield Winners

== Discipline ==
Red Cards

Rank	Player	Red Cards
1		

Yellow Cards

Rank	Player	Yellow Cards
1	(France) Benjamin Garcia	1
1	(Australia) James Maloney	1
1	(England) Sam Tomkins	1

== Player statistics ==
#	Player	Position	Tries	Goals	DG	Points
1	David Mead	Fullback	3	0	0	12
2	Lewis Tierney	Wing	1	0	0	4
3	Samisoni Langi	Centre	7	0	0	28
5	Fouad Yaha	Wing	9	0	0	36
6	James Maloney	Stand-off	2	56	0	120
7	Josh Drinkwater	Stand-off	1	0	0	4
8	Rémi Casty	Prop	0	0	0	0
9	Michael McIlorum	Hooker	1	0	0	4
10	Sam Moa	Prop	0	0	0	0
11	Matt Whitley	Second-row	6	0	0	24
12	Joel Tomkins	Second-row	4	0	0	16
13	Benjamin Garcia	Centre	2	0	0	8
14	Julian Bousquet	Prop	3	0	0	12
15	Mickael Simon	Prop	0	0	0	0
16	Tom Davies	Wing	12	0	0	48
17	Benjamin Julien	Second-row	2	0	0	8
18	Alrix Da Costa	Hooker	1	0	0	4
19	Mickael Goudemand	Second-row	0	0	0	0
20	Lucas Albert	Scrum-half	0	0	0	0
21	Paul Séguier	Prop	1	0	0	4
22	Arthur Romano	Centre	0	0	0	0
23	Antoni Maria	Prop	0	0	0	0
24	Jason Baitieri	Loose forward	1	0	0	4
25	Arthur Mourgue	Scrum-half	1	0	0	4
26	Israel Folau	Centre	5	0	0	20
27	Gavin Marguerite	Centre	0	0	0	0
28	Sam Kasiano	Prop	2	0	0	8
29	Sam Tomkins	Fullback	5	0	0	20
30	Jordan Dezaria	Second-row	0	0	0	0

- As of 1 November 2020

== 2020 squad ==
2020 Catalans Dragons Squad
First team squad			Coaching staff
1 (Papua New Guinea) David Mead – CE, FB, WG; 2 (Scotland) Lewis Tierney – WG, FB; 3 (Australia) Samisoni Langi – CE, SO, LF; 4; 5 (France) Fouad Yaha – WG; 6 (Australia) James Maloney – SO, SH; 7 (Australia) Josh Drinkwater – SO, SH; 8 (France) Rémi Casty (c) – PR; 9 (England) Michael McIlorum – HK; 10 (Samoa) Sam Moa – PR; 11 (England) Matt Whitley – SR; 12 (England) Joel Tomkins – SR; 13 (France) Benjamin Garcia – CE, SR	14 (France) Julian Bousquet – PR; 15 (France) Mickael Simon – PR; 16 (England) Tom Davies – WG; 17 (France) Benjamin Julien – SR; 18 (France) Alrix Da Costa – HK; 19 (France) Mickael Goudemand – SR; 20 (France) Lucas Albert – SH, SO; 21 (France) Paul Séguier – PR; 22 (France) Arthur Romano – CE, WG; 23 (France) Antoni Maria – PR; 24 (France) Jason Baitieri – LF; 25 (France) Arthur Mourgue – SH; 26 (Australia) Israel Folau – CE	27 (France) Gavin Marguerite – CE, WG; 28 (New Zealand) Sam Kasiano – PR; 29 (England) Sam Tomkins – FB, SH, SO; 30 (France) Jordan Dezaria – PR, SR	Head coach: (England) Steve McNamara; Assistant coach: (France) Thomas Bosc; Legend: (c) Captain(s); (vc) Vice-captain(s); Updated: 7 November 2019; Source(s): 2020 Squad Numbers

== 2020 transfers ==
Gains

Player	Club	Contract	Date
(England) Tom Davies	Wigan Warriors	2 Years	September 2019
(Australia) Josh Drinkwater	Hull Kingston Rovers	2 Years	October 2019
(Australia) James Maloney	Penrith Panthers	2 Years	November 2019
(England) Joel Tomkins	Hull Kingston Rovers	2 Years	November 2019
(France) Jordan Dezaria	Toulouse Olympique	2 Years	December 2019
(France) Gavin Marguerite	Toulouse Olympique	2 Years	December 2019

Losses

Player	Club	Contract	Date
(Australia) Greg Bird	Retirement	N/A	October 2019
(England) Jodie Broughton	Halifax	1 Year	November 2019
(France) Tony Gigot	Released	N/A	November 2019
(England) Matty Smith	Released	N/A	November 2019
(Australia) Kenny Edwards	Huddersfield Giants	2 Years	November 2019
