= 2022 Catalans Dragons season =

Rugby team season

Catalans Dragons 2022 season
- Super League XXVII Rank: 4
- Challenge Cup: QF
- 2022 record: Wins: 17; draws: 0; losses: 11
- Points scored: For: 535; against: 465

Team information
- Chairman: Bernard Guasch
- Head Coach: Steve McNamara
- Captain: Benjamin Garcia
- Stadium: Stade Gilbert Brutus
- Avg. attendance: 8,068
- Agg. attendance: 104,894
- High attendance: 10,260
- Low attendance: 6,487

Top scorers
- Tries: Fouad Yaha (20)
- Goals: Sam Tomkins (46)
- Points: Sam Tomkins (105)
Home colours	Away colours
← 2021	List of seasons	2023 →

The 2022 season was Catalans Dragons' 15th consecutive season playing in England's top division of rugby league. During the season they competed in the Super League XXVII and the 2022 Challenge Cup.

== Results ==
=== Pre-season friendlies ===
W Win L Loss

Pre-season results
Date	Versus	H/A	Venue	Result	Score	Tries	Goals	Attendance	Report
29 January	Toulouse Olympique	A	Stade Ernest Wallon	W	26–10			5,000	

=== Super League ===
==== Table ====
Pos	Team	Pld	W	D	L	PF	PA	PD	Pts	Qualification
1	St Helens (C, L)	27	21	0	6	674	374	+300	42	Advance to semi-finals
2	Wigan Warriors	27	19	0	8	818	483	+335	38	Advance to semi-finals
3	Huddersfield Giants	27	17	1	9	613	497	+116	35	Advance to elimination finals
4	Catalans Dragons	27	16	0	11	539	513	+26	32	Advance to elimination finals
5	Leeds Rhinos	27	14	1	12	577	528	+49	29	Advance to elimination finals
6	Salford Red Devils	27	14	0	13	700	602	+98	28	Advance to elimination finals
7	Castleford Tigers	27	13	0	14	544	620	−76	26	
8	Hull Kingston Rovers	27	12	0	15	498	608	−110	24	
9	Hull FC	27	11	0	16	508	675	−167	22	
10	Wakefield Trinity	27	10	0	17	497	648	−151	20	
11	Warrington Wolves	27	9	0	18	568	664	−96	18	
12	Toulouse Olympique (R)	27	5	0	22	421	745	−324	10	Relegated to the Championship

(C) Champions; (L) League Leaders' Shield Winners; (R) Relegated

==== Super League results ====
W Win D Draw L Loss

Super League results
Date	Round	Versus	H/A	Venue	Result	Score	Tries	Goals	Attendance	Report
10 February	1	St Helens	A	Totally Wicked Stadium	L	8–28			13,178	RLP
19 February	2	Wakefield Trinity	H	Stade Gilbert Brutus	W	24–22			7,623	RLP
24 February	3	Leeds Rhinos	A	Headingley	W	10–4			10,655	RLP
4 March	4	Warrington Wolves	A	Halliwell Jones Stadium	W	24–18			9,295	RLP
12 March	5	Wigan Warriors	H	Stade Gilbert Brutus	W	28–0			7,481	RLP
18 March	6	Hull KR	H	Stade Gilbert Brutus	W	27–14			6,782	RLP
1 April	7	Huddersfield Giants	A	John Smiths Stadium	L	12–28			3,845	RLP
14 April	8	Toulouse Olympique	H	Stade Gilbert Brutus	W	18–10			8,922	RLP
18 April	9	Salford Red Devils	A	AJ Bell Stadium	W	36–10			3,221	RLP
24 April	10	Hull FC	A	MKM Stadium	L	8–14			9,101	RLP
29 April	11	Castleford Tigers	H	Stade Gilbert Brutus	W	44–12			6,487	RLP
14 May	12	Warrington Wolves	H	Stade Gilbert Brutus	W	40–8			9,307	RLP
22 May	13	Hull KR	A	Hull College Community Stadium	W	20–8			7,199	RLP
3 June	14	Huddersfield Giants	H	Stade Gilbert Brutus	L	14–22			7,240	RLP
11 June	15	Hull FC	H	Stade Gilbert Brutus	W	36–8			8,847	RLP
26 June	16	Castleford Tigers	A	Mend-A-Hose Jungle	L	16–17			6,510	RLP
2 July	17	St Helens	H	Stade Gilbert Brutus	W	20–18			10,260	RLP
10 July	18	Warrington Wolves	N	St James' Park	L	10–36			25,333	RLP
17 July	19	Salford Red Devils	A	AJ Bell Stadium	L	6–32			2,607	RLP
23 July	20	Huddersfield Giants	H	Stade Gilbert Brutus	W	13–12			6,845	RLP
30 July	21	Leeds Rhinos	H	Stade Gilbert Brutus	L	32–36			8,165	RLP
7 August	22	Wakefield Trinity	A	Be Well Support Stadium	W	20–16			3,227	RLP
12 August	23	Castleford Tigers	A	Mend-A-Hose Jungle	L	8–18			6,147	RLP
20 August	24	Salford Red Devils	H	Stade Gilbert Brutus	L	14–46			7,133	RLP
25 August	25	Toulouse Olympique	A	Stade Ernest Wallon	W	24–14			9,168	RLP
29 August	26	Leeds Rhinos	H	Stade Gilbert Brutus	W	32–18			9,802	RLP
3 September	27	Wigan Warriors	A	DW Stadium	L	4–48			13,275	RLP

==== Play-offs ====
Play-off results
Date	Round	Versus	H/A	Venue	Result	Score	Tries	Goals	Attendance	Report
18 September	Eliminators	Leeds Rhinos	H	Stade Gilbert Brutus	L	10–20			9,514	RLP

===== Team bracket =====
Eliminators
4	Catalans Dragons	10
5	Leeds Rhinos	20
3	Huddersfield Giants	0
6	Salford Red Devils	28

Semi-finals
2	Wigan Warriors	8
5	Leeds Rhinos	20
1	St Helens	19
6	Salford Red Devils	12

Grand Final
5	Leeds Rhinos	12
1	St Helens	24

Source:Rugby League Project

=== Challenge Cup ===
W Win L Loss

Challenge Cup results
Date	Round	Versus	H/A	Venue	Result	Score	Tries	Goals	Attendance	Report
26 March	6	Featherstone Rovers	H	Stade Gilbert Brutus	W	27–14			3,624	RLP
9 April	Quarter-final	St Helens	H	Stade Gilbert Brutus	L	20–36			8,624	RLP

== Players ==
=== Squad ===
2022 Catalans Dragons squad
First team squad			Coaching staff
1 (France) Arthur Mourgue – FB, SH, SO; 2 (England) Tom Davies – WG; 3 (Tonga) Samisoni Langi – CE, SO; 4 (New Zealand) Dean Whare – CE; 5 (France) Fouad Yaha – WG; 6 (Australia) Mitchell Pearce – SO, SH; 7 (Australia) Josh Drinkwater – SH, SO; 8 (Wales) Gil Dudson – PR; 9 (Ireland) Michael McIlorum – HK; 10 (France) Julian Bousquet – PR; 11 (England) Matt Whitley – SR; 12 (England) Mike McMeeken – SR; 13 (France) Benjamin Garcia (c) – SR	14 (France) Alrix Da Costa – HK; 15 (France) Benjamin Julien – SR, PR; 16 (France) Paul Séguier – PR; 17 (France) Mickael Goudemand – SR, LF; 18 (France) Mathieu Laguerre – CE; 19 (France) Arthur Romano – CE, WG; 20 (Samoa) Tyrone May – SO, LF, CE; 21 (France) Corentin Le Cam – SR; 22 (Cook Islands) Dylan Napa – PR; 23 (France) Jordan Dezaria – LF, SR, PR; 24 (France) Mathieu Cozza – PR; 25 (France) César Rougé – SH; 26 (France) Romain Franco – WG	27 (France) Joe Chan – SR; 28 (Samoa) Sam Kasiano – PR; 29 (England) Sam Tomkins – FB, SH; 30 (France) Florian Vailhen – PR	Head coach: (England) Steve McNamara; Assistant coach: (France) Thomas Bosc; Legend: (c) Captain(s); (vc) Vice-captain(s); Updated: 15 December 2021; Source(s): 2022 Squad Numbers

=== Transfers ===
==== Gains ====
Player	Club	Contract	Date
(Australia) Mitchell Pearce	Newcastle Knights	2 years	November 2021
(Cook Islands) Dylan Napa	Canterbury Bulldogs	2 years	November 2021
(Samoa) Tyrone May	Penrith Panthers	1 year	December 2021

==== Losses ====
Player	Club	Contract	Date
(Australia) James Maloney	FC Lézignan	1 year	August 2021
(England) Joel Tomkins	Retired	N/A	November 2021
