= List of Catalans Dragons seasons =

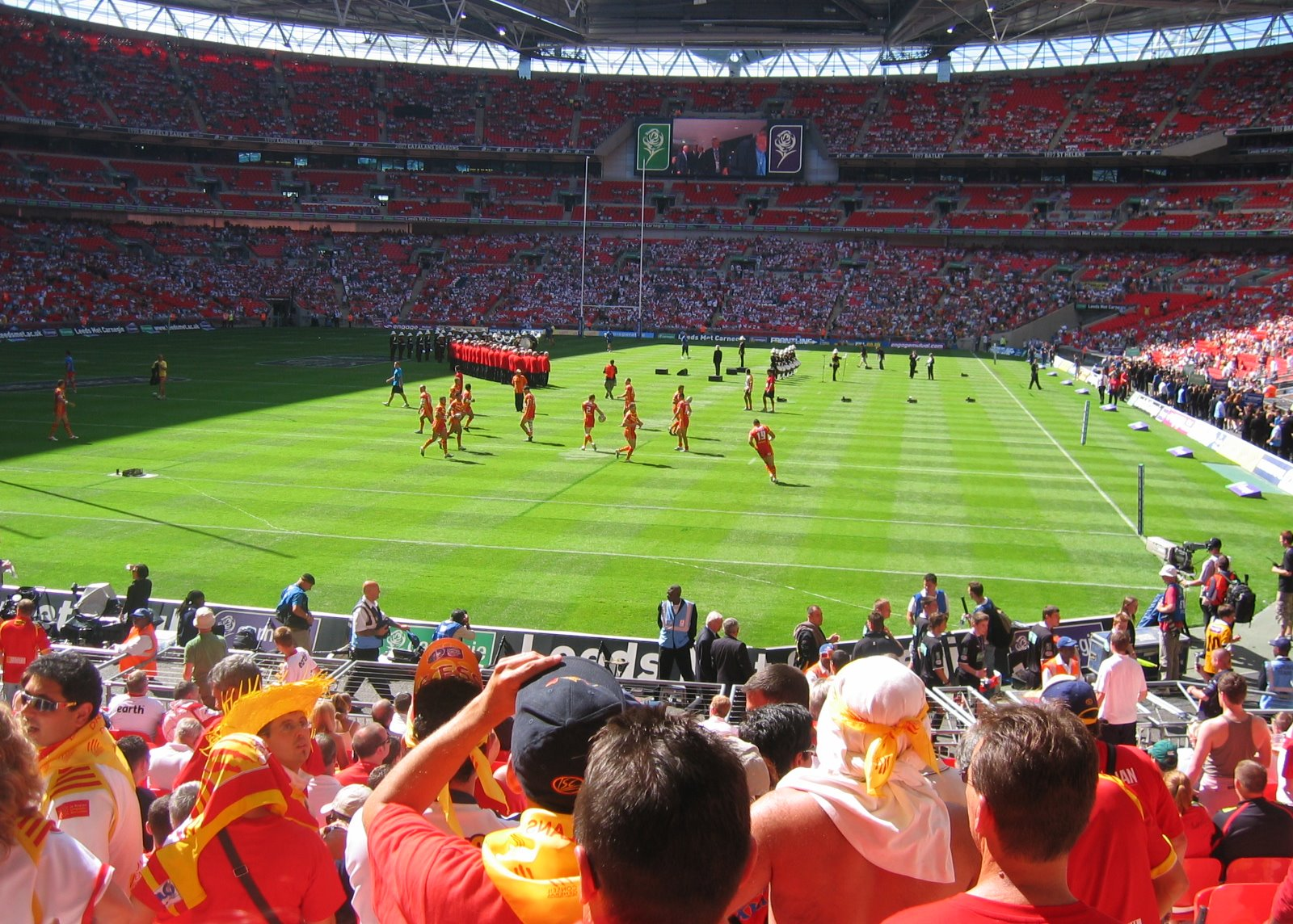
Catalans Dragons fans at Wembley ahead of the 2007 Challenge Cup Final

This is a list of seasons played by Catalans Dragons. It covers the period from the club's inaugural season in the Super League in 2006, to the current 2020 season. It also covers their inaugural five seasons in the French Rugby League Championship as Union Treiziste Catalane. It details the club's achievements in all major competitions and the top try and points scorers for each season.

== Seasons ==
Season (As Union Treiziste Catalane)	League										Lord Derby Cup	Top try scorer		Top points scorer	
Season (As Union Treiziste Catalane)	Division	P	W	D	L	F	A	Pts	Pos	Play-offs	Lord Derby Cup	Name	Goals	Name	Goals
2000–01 (Note: Inaugural Season)	French Championship	Unknown							3rd	Unknown	W				
2001–02	French Championship	Unknown								Runners-up	Unknown				
2002–03		Unknown								Unknown	Unknown				
2003–04	Elite One Championship	18	15	0	3	669	280	48	1st	Runners-up	Unknown				
2004–05	Elite One Championship	18	17	1	0	834	214	53	1st	Champions	W				
2005–06	Elite One Championship	20	13	1	6	714	458	47	4th	Unknown	W				
Season (As Catalans Dragons)	League										Challenge Cup (Note: Catalans Dragons had previously competed on the Challenge Cup as Union Treiziste Catalane in addition to the French equivalent. They Achieved a Round 5 finish in 2002 and 2005, and a Round 4 finish in 2003 and 2004.)	Top try scorer		Top points scorer	
Season (As Catalans Dragons)	Division	P	W	D	L	F	A	Pts (Note: Win Percentage for 2020 and 2021)	Pos	Play-offs	Challenge Cup	Name	Goals	Name	Goals
2006	Super League	28	8	0	20	601	894	16	12th (Note: Although Catalans finished bottom of the league, they remained in the Super League due to their exemption from relegation in their first three seasons in the league.)	Did not quality	QF	Justin Murphy	28	Justin Murphy	112
2007	Super League	27	10	1	16	570	685	21	10th	Did not quality	RU	Three Players (Note: Thomas Bosc, Clint Greenshields, and Adam Mogg)	13	Thomas Bosc	189
2008	Super League	27	16	2	9	694	625	34	3rd	Lost in elimination semi-final	R5	Clint Greenshields	18	Thomas Bosc	275
2009	Super League	27	13	0	14	613	660	26	8th	Lost in qualifying semi-final	R5	Olivier Elima	19	Thomas Bosc	196
2010	Super League	27	6	0	21	409	747	12	14th (Note: Reprieved from relegation due to licensing)	Did not quality	SF	Clint Greenshields	11	Thomas Bosc	135
2011	Super League	27	15	1	11	689	626	31	6th	Lost in preliminary semi-final	R5	Damien Blanch	21	Scott Dureau	237
2012	Super League	27	18	0	9	812	611	36	4th	Lost in preliminary semi-final	QF	Vincent Duport	19	Scott Dureau	323
2013	Super League	27	13	2	12	619	604	28	7th	Lost in Elimination Playoff	QF	Morgan Escaré	19	Thomas Bosc	213
2014	Super League	27	14	1	12	733	667	29	7th	Lost in qualifying semi-final	R5	Morgan Escaré	29	Thomas Bosc	175
2015	Super League	30	13	2	15	739	770	28	8th	Did not quality	QF	TBA	TBA	TBA	TBA
2016	Super League	30	15	0	15	723	716	30	6th	Did not quality	QF	TBA	TBA	TBA	TBA
2017	Super League	23	7	1	15	469	689	15	10th	Won Million Pound Game	R6	TBA	TBA	TBA	TBA
2017	The Qualifiers	7	4	0	3	130	143	8	5th	Won Million Pound Game	R6	TBA	TBA	TBA	TBA
2018	Super League	30	12	1	17	596	750	25	7th	Did not quality	W	TBA	TBA	TBA	TBA
2019	Super League	29	13	0	16	553	745	26	7th	Did not quality	QF	TBA	TBA	TBA	TBA
2020	Super League	13	8	0	5	376	259	61.54	4th	Lost in semi-final	QF	TBA	TBA	TBA	TBA
2021	Super League	23	19	0	4	688	398	82.61	1st	Lost in Grand Final	QF	TBA	TBA	TBA	TBA
2022	Super League	27	16	0	11	539	513	32	4th	Lost in elimination playoffs	QF	TBA	TBA	TBA	TBA
2023	Super League	27	20	0	7	722	420	40	2nd	Lost in Grand Final	R6	TBA	TBA	TBA	TBA
2024	Super League	27	15	0	12	474	427	30	7th	Did not qualify	QF	TBA	TBA	TBA	TBA
2025	Super League	27	10	0	17	425	652	20	9th	Did not qualify	SF	TBA	TBA	TBA	TBA
2026	Super League	27	10	0	17	537	802	20	9th	Did not qualify	QF	TBA	TBA	TBA	TBA

== Key ==
Key to league record:

- P = Played
- W = Games won
- D = Games drawn
- L = Games lost
- F = Points for
- A = Points against
- Pts = League points
- Pos = Final league position

Key to rounds:

- R4 = Round 4
- R5 = Round 5
- QF = Quarter-finals
- SF = Semi-finals
- RU = Runners-up
- W = Winners
