= 2018 Challenge Cup final =

Rugby league match in the United Kingdom

2018 Challenge Cup Final
Catalans Dragons	Warrington Wolves
20	14
	1	2	Total
CAT	14	6	20
WAR	6	8	14
- Date: 25 August 2018
- Stadium: Wembley Stadium, London
- Location: London, United Kingdom
- Lance Todd Trophy: Tony Gigot
- God Save The Queen and Abide with Me: Laura Wright
- Referee: Robert Hicks
- Attendance: 50,672

Broadcast partners
- Broadcasters: BBC One

The 2018 Challenge Cup Final was the 117th cup-deciding game of the rugby league 2018 Challenge Cup Season. It was held at Wembley Stadium in London on 25 August 2018, kick off 15:00. The final was contested by the Catalans Dragons and the Warrington Wolves. The game saw Catalans Dragons beat Warrington Wolves by 20 points to 14 and saw the Dragons win the competition for the first time.

== Background ==
This would be Catalans Dragons second appearance in a Challenge Cup Final having come runners-up to St Helens during the 2007 Challenge Cup Final. By contrast, this would be warrington's 18th cup final and the 5th of the Super League era, having most recently achieving a runners-up place in 2016, and winning the competition in 2009, 2010, and 2012.

== Route to the final ==
=== Catalans Dragons ===
Having played in the qualifiers during the 2017 Super League, Catalans Dragons entered in one round earlier than their finalist opponents. In the fifth round they drew eventual League 1 champions York City Knights who they beat 34–22. The sixth round saw them face a second League 1 team, Whitehaven who they thrashed 56 points to 10. The quarter finals saw the Dragons play Super League side Huddersfield Giants beating them 20 points to six. In the semi-finals, Catalans Dragons beat eventual Super League league leaders St Helens 53 points to 16 to reach the final.

Round	Opposition	Score
5th	York City Knights (A)	34–22
6th	Whitehaven (H)	56–10
QF	Huddersfield (A)	20–6
SF	St Helens (N)	35–16

=== Warrington Wolves ===
Warrington Wolves drew Championship side Toronto Wolfpack, thrashing them 66–10, before nilling rivals and eventual league champions Wigan Warriors, scoring 23 points, to reach the semi-finals. The semi-final saw the Wolves comfortably beat relegation threatened Leeds Rhinos 48–12 to reach the final.

Round	Opposition	Score
6th	Toronto Wolfpack (H)	66–10
QF	Wigan Warriors (H)	23–0
SF	Leeds Rhinos (N)	48–12

== Match details ==
Saturday, 25 August
15:00

Catalans Dragons
Tries
Lewis Tierney ('2)
Benjamin Garcia ('35)
Brayden Wiliame ('46)
Goals
Josh Drinkwater ('3, '8, '36, '47)
20 - 14
Report

Warrington Wolves
Tries
Ben Murdoch-Masila ('29)
George King ('56)

Goals
Tyrone Roberts ('30, '57,)
Penalty Goals
Tyrone Roberts ('70)

Wembley Stadium, London
Attendance: 50,672
Referee: (England) Robert Hicks
Player of the Match: (France) Tony Gigot

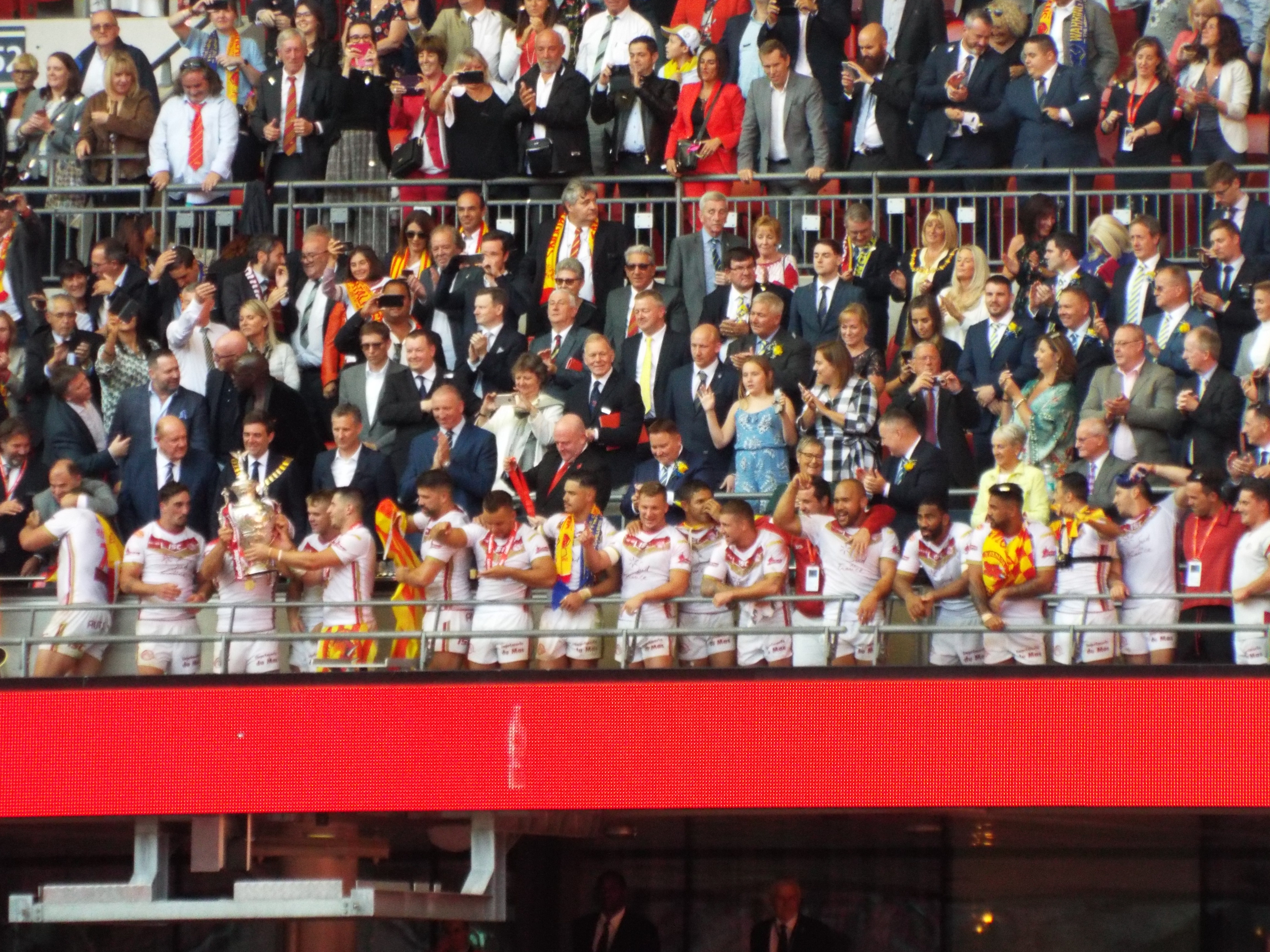
Catalans lifting the Challenge Cup at Wembley in 2018

Catalans Dragons	Posit.		Warrington Wolves
Tony Gigot	.	.	Stefan Ratchford
Lewis Tierney	.	.	Tom Lineham
David Mead	.	.	Bryson Goodwin
Brayden Wiliame	.	.	Toby King
Fouad Yaha	.	.	Josh Charnley
Samisoni Langi	.	.	Kevin Brown
Josh Drinkwater	.	.	Tyrone Roberts
Mickael Simon	.	.	Chris Hill (c)
Michael McIlorum	.	.	Daryl Clark
Sam Moa	.	.	Michael Cooper
Benjamin Jullien	.	.	Harvey Livett
Benjamin Garcia	.	.	Jack Hughes
Rémi Casty (c)	.	.	Ben Westwood
Julian Bousquet	Int.		Ben Murdoch-Masila
Jason Baitieri	Int.		George King
Mickael Goudemand	Int.		Declan Patton
Kenny Edwards	Int.		Joe Philbin
Steve McNamara	Coach		Steve Price

== Post match ==
As winners of the 2018 Challenge Cup Final, Catalans Dragons became the first non-English team to win the tournament. Unfortunately, the match attendance of 50,672 was the lowest since the second world war. The presence of Catalans Dragons, a French team, in the final was thought to be a factor; despite an attendance of almost 35,000 more making the journey to Wembley for the 2007 Challenge Cup Final where the Dragons finished as runners-up.
