= 2021 Super League Grand Final =

Rugby league final match

Catalans Dragons	St Helens
10	12
	1	2	Total
CAT	4	6	10
STH	6	6	12
- Date: 9 October 2021
- Stadium: Old Trafford
- Location: Manchester
- Harry Sunderland Trophy: (Fiji) Kevin Naiqama ( St Helens)
- Jerusalem: Laura Wright
- Referee: Liam Moore
- Attendance: 45,177

Broadcast partners
- Broadcasters: (United Kingdom) Sky Sports (Australia) Fox League

The 2021 Super League Grand Final was the 24th official grand final and championship-deciding game of Super League XXVI. The game was contested between Catalans Dragons and St Helens at Old Trafford. The game concluded by St Helens edging out Catalans by two points.

== Background ==
The two finalists finished first and second in the regular season with Catalans winning 19 of their 23 games and St Helens 16 out of 21. These league positions earned both clubs the chance to go to the second (semi-final) round of the play-offs and home advantage in their semi-final matches.

Pos	Team	Pld	W	D	L	PF	PA	PP	WPCT
1	Catalans Dragons	23	19	0	4	688	398	172.9	82.61
2	St Helens	21	16	0	5	548	229	239.3	76.19

=== Route to the final ===
==== Catalans Dragons ====
Catalans finished first in the regular season, to claim their first League Leaders Shield since entering the competition in 2000. In their semi-final, they played Hull KR, the lowest ranked winning team from the elimination finals. Catalans won the match 28–10, with tries from Benjamin Garcia, Josh Drinkwater, Arthur Mourgue, Fouad Yaha and Joe Chan to reach their first ever grand final, and becoming the first non English team in super league era to do so.

Round	Opposition	Score
Preliminary Final	Hull KR (H)	28-10
Key: (H) = Home venue; (A) = Away venue; (N) = Neutral venue.

==== St Helens ====
Reigning and defending champions St Helens finished second in the regular season and faced Leeds Rhinos (the highest ranked team to win an elimination final), in their semi-final. St Helens won the match 36–8, to reach the grand final for a 3rd consecutive year, a record 13th time.

Round	Opposition	Score
Preliminary Final	Leeds Rhinos (H)	36-8
Key: (H) = Home venue; (A) = Away venue; (N) = Neutral venue.

== Match details ==
9 October 2021
18:00 BST (UTC+01)

Catalans Dragons	10–12	St Helens
Tries: McMeeken 50'; Goals: Maloney 9' (pen), 27' (pen), 51'	Report (RFL); Report (Sky Sports)	Tries: Naiqama 13' 66; Makinson (yellow card) 45'; Goals: Coote 21' (pen), 67'

Old Trafford, Manchester
Attendance: 45,177
Referee: Liam Moore
Harry Sunderland Award:
Kevin Naiqama (St Helens)

Catalans Dragons		Position	St Helens	
29	(England) Sam Tomkins	Fullback	1	(Scotland) Lachlan Coote
2	(England) Tom Davies	Wing	2	(England) Tommy Makinson (yellow card) 45'
3	(Tonga) Samisoni Langi	Centre	3	(Fiji) Kevin Naiqama 13', 66', (substituted off) 68'
4	(New Zealand) Dean Whare (substituted off) 44'	Centre	4	(England) Mark Percival
5	(France) Fouad Yaha	Wing	5	(Wales) Regan Grace
6	(Australia) James Maloney	Stand-off	6	(England) Jonny Lomax
7	(Australia) Josh Drinkwater	Scrum-half	21	(England) Lewis Dodd
8	(Wales) Gil Dudson (substituted off) 20' (substituted off) 71'	Prop	8	(England) Alex Walmsley (substituted off) 27' (substituted on) 58'
9	(England) Michael Mcilorum (substituted off) 62'	Hooker	9	(England) James Roby
10	(France) Julian Bousquet (substituted off) 23' (substituted on) 57'	Prop	10	(England) Matty Lees (substituted off) 30' (substituted on) 68'
11	(England) Matt Whitley	Second-row	14	(Australia) Sione Mata'utia
12	(England) Mike McMeeken 50'	Second-row	20	(England) Joe Batchelor
13	(France) Benjamin Garcia (substituted off) 61' (substituted on) 71'	Prop	13	(England) Morgan Knowles (substituted off) 35' (substituted on) 54'
1	(France) Arthur Mourgue (substituted on) 62'	Interchange	15	(England) Louie McCarthy-Scarsbrook (substituted on) 27' (substituted off) 54'
17	(France) Mickael Goudemand (substituted on) 44'	Interchange	16	(England) Kyle Amor
22	(England) Joel Tomkins (substituted on) 20' (substituted off) 57' (substituted on) 61'	Interchange	17	(Tonga) Agnatius Paasi (substituted on) 30' (substituted off) 58'
28	(New Zealand) Sam Kasiano (substituted on) 23' (substituted off) 75'	Interchange	18	(England) Jack Welsby (substituted on) 35'
	(England) Steve McNamara	Coach		(Australia) Kristian Woolf
