= Sam Moa =

Tonga & NZ international rugby league footballer

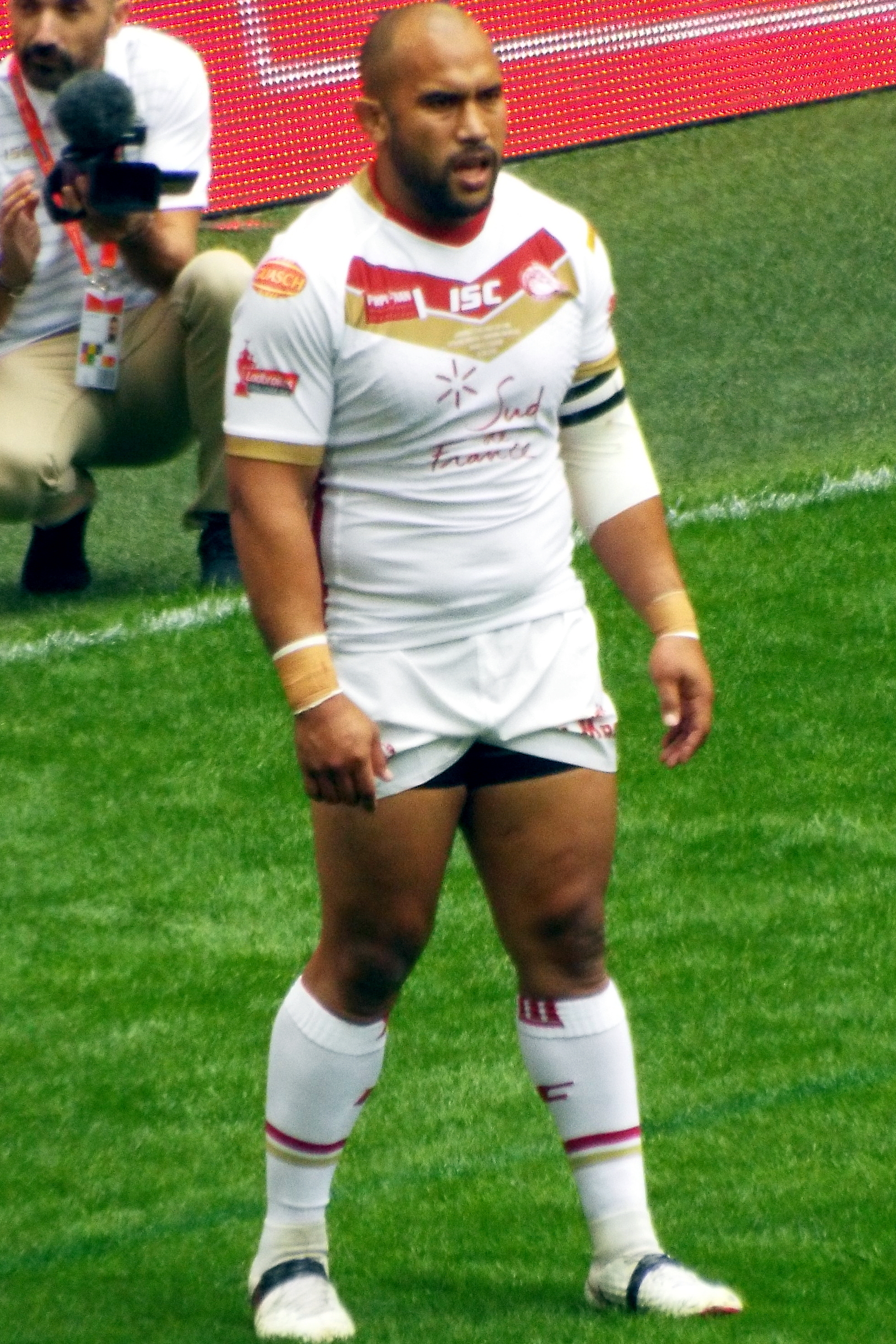

Personal information
- Full name: Samuela Moa
- Born: 14 August 1986 (age 40) Tonga
- Height: 6 ft 0 in (183 cm)
- Weight: 17 st 0 lb (108 kg)

Playing information
- Position: Prop
Club
Years	Team	Pld	T	G	FG	P
2008	Cronulla Sharks	1	0	0	0	0
2009–12	Hull FC	78	7	0	0	28
2013–16	Sydney Roosters	96	9	0	0	36
2017–20	Catalans Dragons	91	8	0	0	32
2021	FC Lézignan	13	3	0	0	12
	Total	279	27	0	0	108
Representative
Years	Team	Pld	T	G	FG	P
2006–17	Tonga	10	0	0	0	0
2013–16	New Zealand	9	2	0	0	8
- Source: As of 22 December 2020 (UTC)

Samuela Moa (born 14 August 1986) is a former professional rugby league footballer who played as a prop, most recently for the FC Lézignan XIII in the French Elite One Championship. He is both Tonga and New Zealand international.

Moa has previously played for the Cronulla-Sutherland Sharks and the Sydney Roosters, with whom he won the 2013 Telstra Premiership in the NRL, and Hull F.C. in the Super League.

== Background ==
Moa was born in Tonga and raised in New Zealand.

== Playing career ==
=== Wests Tigers ===
Moa started his career at NRL side Wests Tigers.

=== Cronulla-Sutherland Sharks ===
He then signed with the Cronulla-Sutherland Sharks in 2008 and playing in one National Rugby League match.

=== Hull FC ===
He was signed by Hull F.C. in January 2009 and arrived a week before the club's fixture with Huddersfield Giants which he featured off the bench in his debut. Moa is good friends with former Hull F.C. and Tonga teammate Willie Manu and former Hull F.C. and Tonga teammate Epalahame Lauaki (now at Bradford Bulls). The trio were commonly known by the Hull fans as 'The Tongan Mafia'.

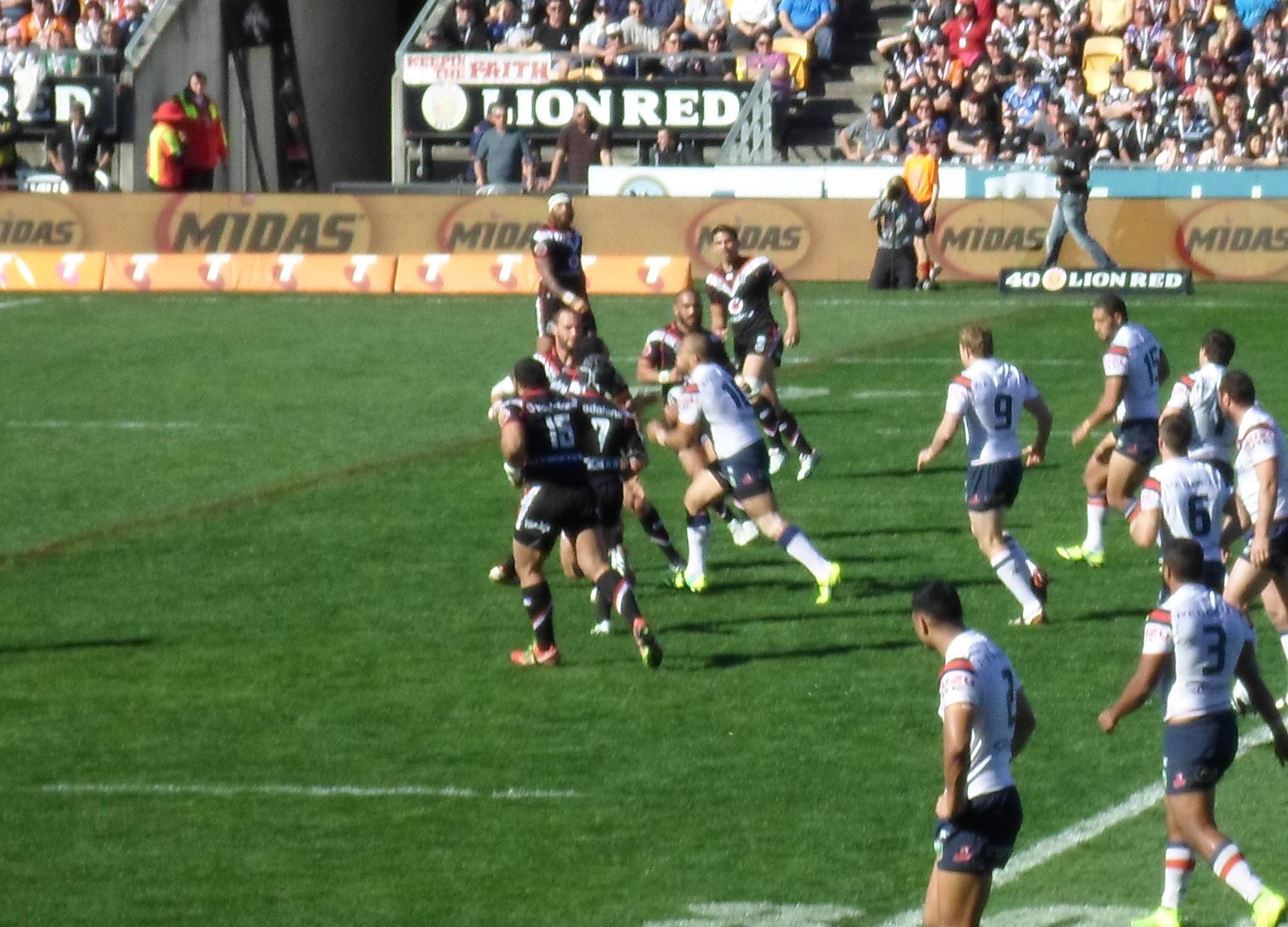
Sam Moa with a dominant run in the Roosters victory against Warriors 2014

=== Sydney Roosters ===
Sam signed for the Sydney Roosters for the 2013 NRL season, winning the premiership with them at the end of the season. Many observed that Moa's performance in the grand final was particularly memorable, flattening Manly's Glenn Stewart with an aggressive kick-off return in the 1st minute.

=== Catalans Dragons ===
Moa joined the French side ahead of the 2017 Super League season.

He played in the 2018 Challenge Cup Final victory over the Warrington Wolves at Wembley Stadium.

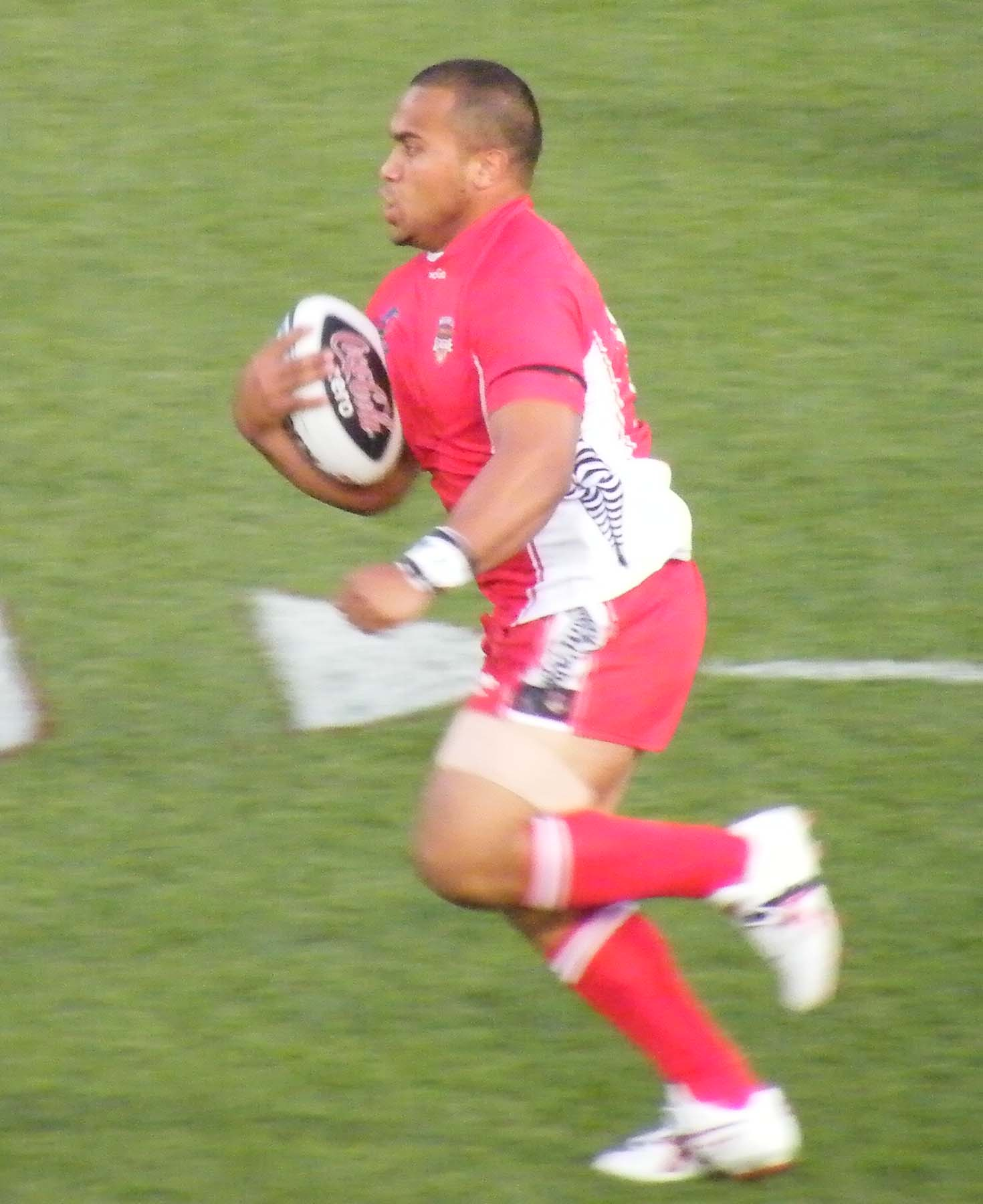
Moa playing for Tonga

On 2 December 2020 it was reported that Moa would leave the club at the end of the 2020 season

=== FC Lézignan XIII ===
On 11 December 2020 it was reported that Moa had signed for FC Lézignan XIII

== Coaching career ==
In November 2021, Catalans Dragons appointed Sam Moa as assistant coach to Steve McNamara. He returned to the club one year after having left the club and retired from playing professional rugby. Sam Moa has signed with the Parramatta Eels for the 2025 season as assistant coach.

== International career ==
=== Tonga ===
Moa first played for Tonga in 2006 as part of the 2008 World Cup qualifying series.

Moa was subsequently picked in the 2008 World Cup squad and went on to feature in all three of Tonga's matches at the tournament.

=== New Zealand ===
He declared himself eligible for selection for New Zealand at the next world cup citing his desire to be part of a world cup winning squad. Despite playing for Tonga against Samoa in the Pacific Rugby League International in April 2013, he played for New Zealand in the 2013 Rugby League World Cup.
