= Sam Kasiano =

New Zealand and Samoa international rugby league footballer

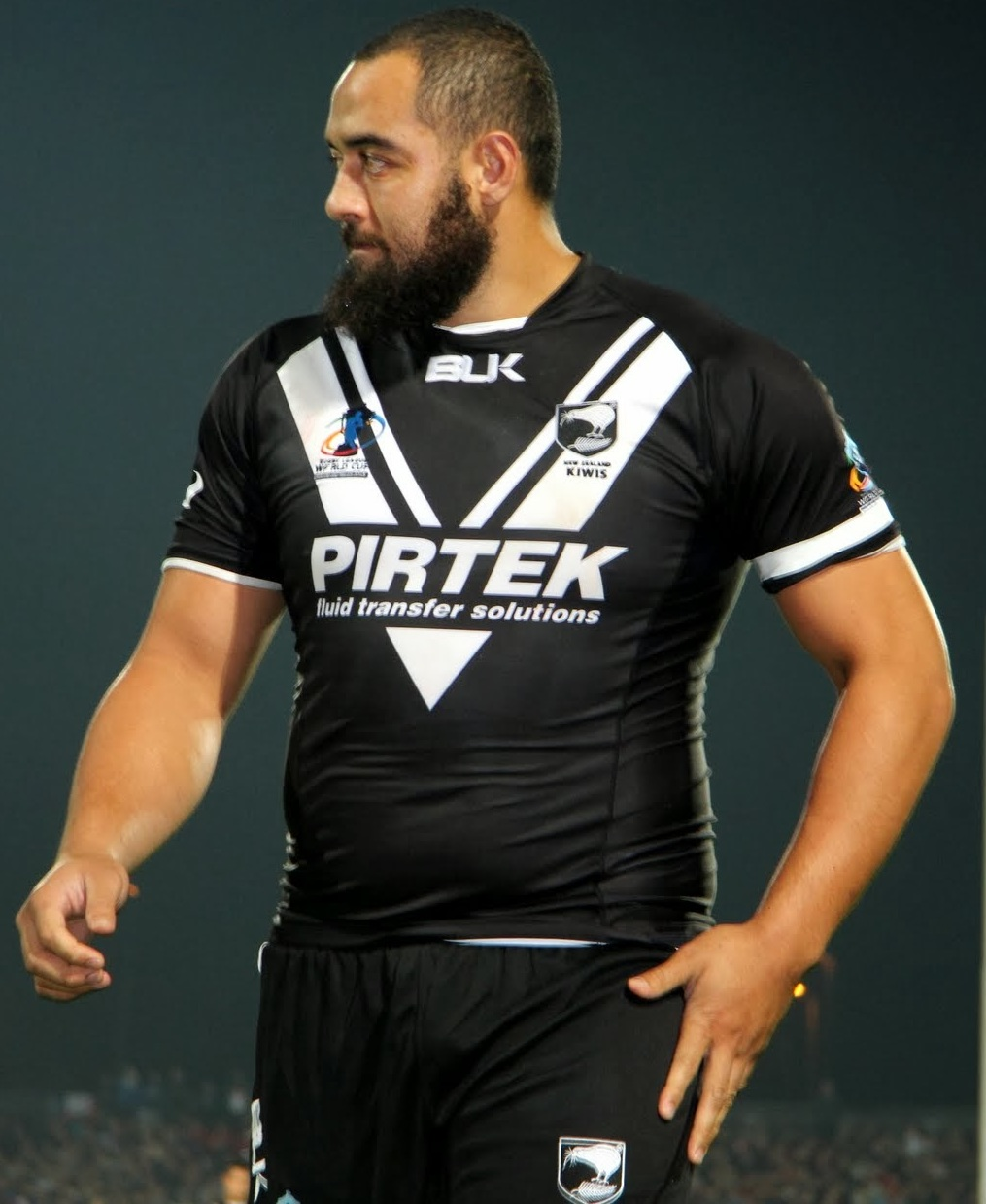

Personal information
- Full name: Sam Kasiano
- Born: 21 September 1990 (age 36) Auckland, New Zealand
- Height: 6 ft 5 in (1.95 m)
- Weight: 19 st 12 lb (126 kg)

Playing information
- Position: Prop
Club
Years	Team	Pld	T	G	FG	P
2011–17	Canterbury Bulldogs	139	15	0	0	60
2018	Melbourne Storm	14	1	0	0	4
2019–22	Catalans Dragons	83	13	0	0	52
2023	Warrington Wolves	26	3	0	0	12
	Total	262	32	0	0	128
Representative
Years	Team	Pld	T	G	FG	P
2012–13	New Zealand	6	0	0	0	0
2015–18	Samoa	5	1	0	0	4
- Source: As of 10 January 2024

Sam Kasiano (born 21 September 1990) is a professional rugby league footballer who plays as a prop for the Souths Sharks in the Mackay & District Rugby League; he is player-coach. He is both a New Zealand and Samoan international.

Kasiano previously played for the Canterbury-Bankstown Bulldogs and Melbourne Storm in the NRL.

== Background ==
Kasiano was born and raised in Auckland, New Zealand. He is of Samoan descent.

Kasiano started playing rugby league at the age of eight for the Otahuhu Leopards but stopped once he started high school. However, in 2007 he played for the Mount Albert Grammar School's 1st XIII.

After moving to Brisbane as a teenager, Kasiano was educated at Wavell State High School where he played for the Aspley Devils under 18s before being picked up by the Norths Devils Colts for the 2009 season. He was then signed by the Bulldogs, and played for their Toyota Cup (Under-20s) team for the 2010 season, where he quickly became one of the competition standouts. His form saw him rewarded with a spot in the 2010 Junior Kiwis team.

== Playing career ==
=== 2011 - 2017: Canterbury Bankstown Bulldogs ===
In Round 1, Kasiano made his NRL debut for the Canterbury-Bankstown Bulldogs at prop against the Wests Tigers in the 24–14 win at ANZ Stadium. He played 19 games in his debut season and picked up the Steve Mortimer Medal for the Bulldogs Rookie of the Year.

In March 2012, it was reported that Kasiano had declared his representative allegiance to the Queensland Maroons and Australian national team, however Kasiano himself sent a letter to the NZRL indicating he wanted to play for the country of his birth, New Zealand. In Round 2 match against the New Zealand Warriors at Mt Smart Stadium, Kasiano scored his first NRL try in the Bulldogs 32–18 win. At the 2012 Dally M Awards Kasiano was named the NRL's prop forward of the year. In the Bulldogs 2012 NRL Grand Final against the Melbourne Storm, Kasiano started at prop in the Bulldogs 14–4 loss. He played in 24 matches and scored a try in the NRL season. Kasiano made his New Zealand test debut in the October Test at prop in the 20–12 loss to Australia at 1300SMILES Stadium.

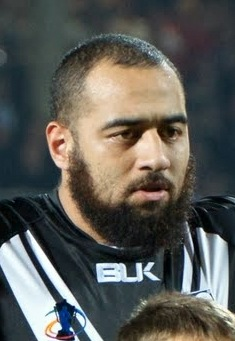
Kasiano playing for New Zealand at the 2013 RLWC

Kasiano missed the first 7 matches of 2013 with a leg injury. In Round 21 match against the St George Illawarra Dragons at Jubilee Oval, Kasiano scored a double in the 39–20 win. He played in scored 3 tries in 13 matches for the Bulldogs in the 2013. Kasiano was selected in the New Zealand 2013 World Cup squad, playing in 5 matches including playing off the interchange bench in the 34–2 loss to Australia in the World Cup final.

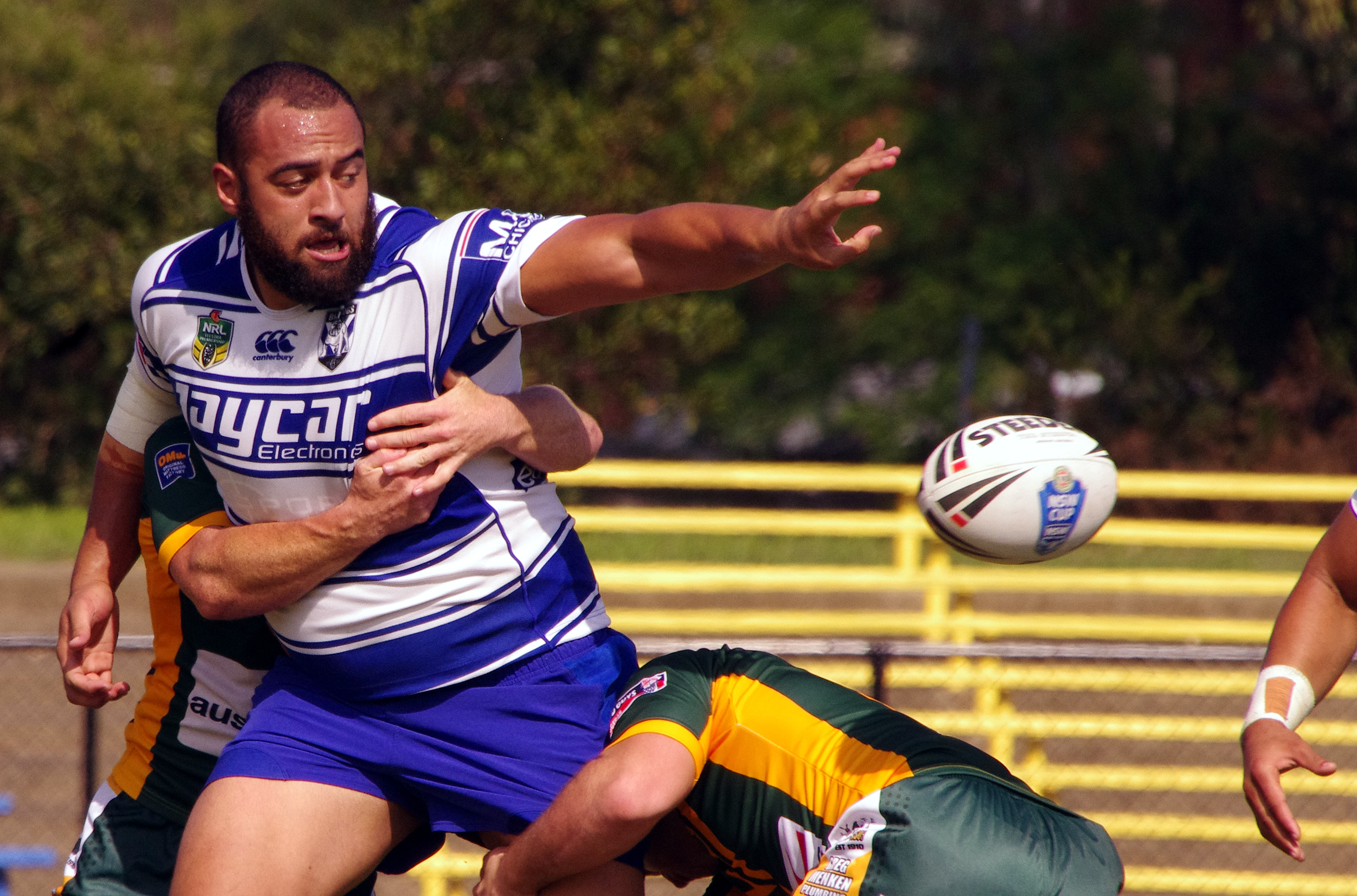
Kasiano playing for the Bulldogs in 2014

Kasiano returned to the Bulldogs first grade squad in Round 7 of the 2014 season against the South Sydney Rabbitohs off the interchange bench in the 15–14 win after missing the early round recovering from a foot injury and playing in NSW Cup. In Round 22 against the Brisbane Broncos at Suncorp Stadium, Kasiano suffered a season ending ankle injury in the Bulldogs 41–10 loss. Kasiano finished the season with him playing 14 matches and scoring 3 tries.

On 3 March 2015, Kasiano extended his contract with the Bulldogs to the end of the 2018 season. On 2 May 2015, Kasiano represented Samoa in the Polynesian Cup against Tonga. He was named man-of-the-match in the test. He and fellow Bulldogs teammate Frank Pritchard, who was captaining the team, made headlines in the match after making a 'double-team' try-saving hit on Tonga's Jorge Taufua in 77th minute forcing him over the sideline and securing Samoa the narrow margin 18–16 victory at Cbus Super Stadium. In Round 21 against the Sydney Roosters, Kasiano was on the receiving end of a shoulder charge from Roosters forward Kane Evans, making headlines as one of the biggest hits of the year. Kasiano finished off the 2015 season having played in 24 games and scoring 2 tries.

On 1 February 2016, Kasiano was named in the Bulldogs 2016 Auckland Nines squad. In Round 6 against the Melbourne Storm, Kasiano played his 100th NRL career match in the Bulldogs 18–12 win at AAMI Park. On 7 May 2016, Kasiano played for Samoa in the 2016 Polynesian Cup against Tonga, where he started at prop in the 18–6 win at Parramatta Stadium. In Round 24 against the Brisbane Broncos, Kasiano was charged with a grade two dangerous contact charge after he kicked Broncos veteran Corey Parker in the face when he attempted to leave a tackle, leaving him with a split lip and chin during the Bulldogs 20–10 loss at Suncorp Stadium. Kasiano was later given a two-match suspension. Kasiano finished the 2016 NRL season with him playing in 23 matches and scoring 6 tries for the Bulldogs. On 8 October 2016, Kasiano represented Samoa in the Samoa vs. Fiji test match, where he started at prop and scored a try in the 20–18 loss in Apia, Samoa.

In February 2017, Kasiano was selected in the Bulldogs 2017 NRL Auckland Nines squad. On 6 May 2017, Kasiano played for Samoa in the test against England, starting at prop in the 30–10 loss at Campbelltown Stadium. On 5 July 2017, it was announced that Kasiano signed a 3-year contract with the Melbourne Storm to the end of the 2020 season. Kasiano finished his last year the Canterbury-Bankstown Bulldogs with playing in 22 matches in the 2017 NRL season.

=== 2018: Melbourne Storm ===
In Round 1 of the 2018 NRL season, Kasiano made his club debut for the Melbourne Storm against his former club the Canterbury-Bankstown Bulldogs, playing off the interchange bench in the 36–18 win at Perth Stadium. In round 6, Kasiano scored his first club try for the Storm in the 40–14 win over the Newcastle Knights at AAMI Park. Out of favour for much of the second half of the season, Kasiano played with Melbourne Storm affiliate Easts Tigers, where he played in the 2018 Queensland Cup Grand Final. He went onto represent Toa Samoa in the 2018 Pacific Rugby League Tests.

=== 2019-22: Catalans Dragons ===
At the end of the 2018 NRL season Kasiano was released by Melbourne, and signed with Super League's Catalan Dragons. On 9 October 2021, Kasiano played for Catalans in their 2021 Super League Grand Final defeat against St. Helens. On 23 May 2022, it was announced that Kasiano had signed a contract to join Warrington for the 2023 Super League season.

=== 2023: Warrington ===
Kasiano played 24 games for Warrington in the 2023 Super League season as Warrington finished sixth on the table and qualified for the playoffs. He played in the clubs elimination playoff loss against St Helens.

=== 2024: Dapto Canaries ===
On 1 March 2024, it was reported that he had joined Dapto Canaries in the Illawarra Rugby League.

=== 2025: South Sharks ===
On 6 February 2025, it was reported that he had joined Mackay & District Rugby League club Souths Sharks as player-coach.
