= Arthur Romano (rugby league) =

France international rugby league footballer

Personal information
- Born: 17 August 1997 (age 29) Carpentras, Provence-Alpes-Côte d'Azur, France
- Height: 6 ft 1 in (1.86 m)
- Weight: 14 st 11 lb (94 kg)

Playing information
- Position: Wing, Centre
Club
Years	Team	Pld	T	G	FG	P
2015–16	Saint-Esteve Catalan	31	12	0	0	48
2017–25	Catalans Dragons	95	22	0	0	88
2018(loan)	→ Toulouse Olympique	3	1	0	0	4
2019(loan)	→ Toulouse Olympique	3	0	0	0	0
2026	Hull FC	12	2	0	0	8
2027–	Catalans Dragons	0	0	0	0	0
	Total	144	37	0	0	148
Representative
Years	Team	Pld	T	G	FG	P
2019	France 9s	3	1	0	0	4
2022–	France	12	3	0	0	12
- Source: As of 24 October 2026

Arthur Romano (born 17 August 1997) is a French professional rugby league footballer who plays as a winger or centre for Catalans Dragons in the Super League and France at international level.

He has previously played for Saint-Esteve in the Elite One Championship. Romano has spent time on loan from Catalans at Toulouse Olympique in the Championship.

== Background ==
Romano was born in Carpentras, Provence-Alpes-Côte d'Azur, France.

== Career ==
=== Catalans Dragons ===
In 2017 he made his Catalans debut in the Challenge Cup against Hull FC. He made his Super League appearance on May 29, 2017, also against Hull FC.

=== Hull FC ===
On 29 September 2025 he signed for Hull FC in the Super League on a 2-year deal.

=== Catalans Dragons (re-join) ===
On 11 September 2026 it was reported that he had signed for Catalans Dragons in the Super League

== International career ==
He was selected in France 9s squad for the 2019 Rugby League World Cup 9s.

On 1 October 2026 he was named in the 2026 France World Cup squad
