= Tom Davies (rugby league) =

England international rugby league footballer

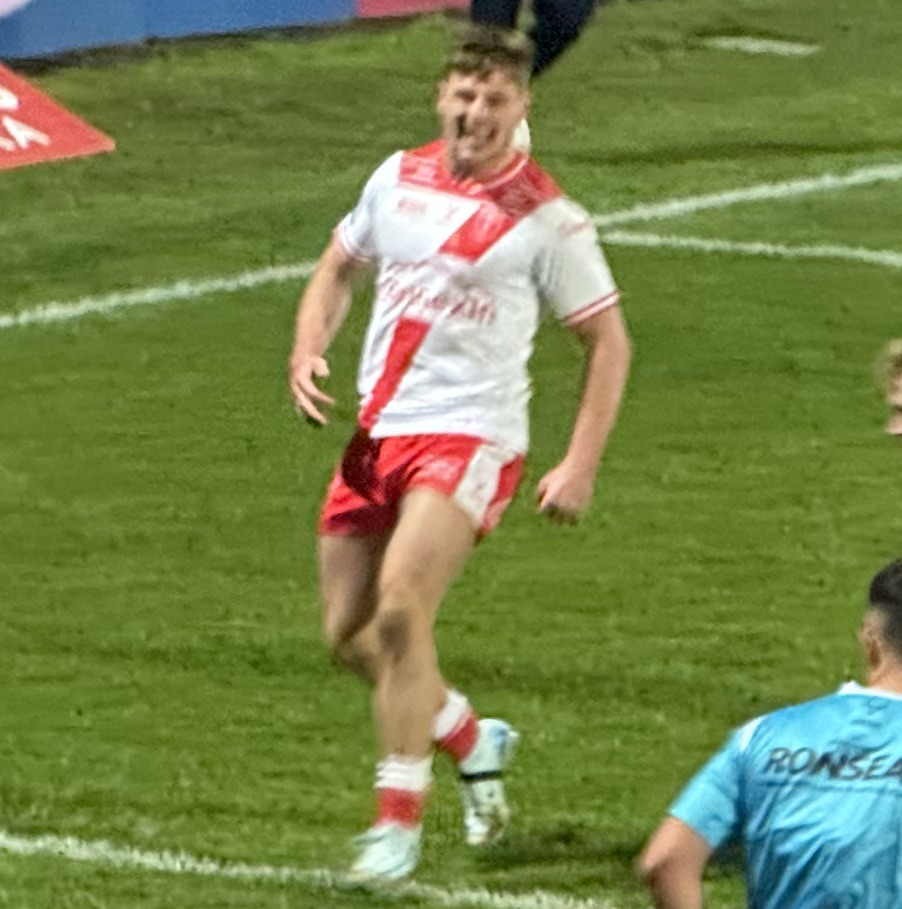

Personal information
- Full name: Thomas Davies
- Born: 11 January 1997 (age 29) Wigan, Lancashire, England
- Height: 6 ft 1 in (1.85 m)
- Weight: 13 st 10 lb (87 kg)

Playing information
- Position: Wing
Club
Years	Team	Pld	T	G	FG	P
2017–19	Wigan Warriors	62	30	0	0	120
2017(loan)	→ Swinton Lions	4	1	0	0	4
2020–24	Catalans Dragons	109	63	0	0	184
2025–	Hull Kingston Rovers	64	36	0	0	144
	Total	239	130	0	0	452
Representative
Years	Team	Pld	T	G	FG	P
2018	England Knights	2	2	0	0	8
2021	England	1	1	0	0	4
- Source: As of 19 September 2026

Tom Davies (born 11 January 1997) is an English rugby league footballer who plays as a winger for Hull Kingston Rovers in the Super League and England at international level.

He previously played for the Wigan Warriors in the Super League, and spent time on loan from Wigan at the Swinton Lions in the Championship.

== Background ==
Davies was born in Wigan, Lancashire, England.

He signed for Wigan after an initial trial having played amateur rugby league for Shevington Sharks, Orrell St. James and Wigan St. Patrick’s. At the time of the trial he was playing semi-professional rugby union with Fylde after being released from a scholarship with Leigh Centurions. He made his professional début on 19 March 2017, scoring a try against Huddersfield Giants in a 16–16 draw.

== Club career ==
=== Wigan Warriors ===
Following the departure of Josh Charnley to the Sale Sharks, and injuries to first team wingers Joe Burgess, Lewis Tierney and Dom Manfredi, Davies got his début against Huddersfield. After scoring on début he kept his place despite the return of Burgess and Tierney. He then scored a brace of long range tries against the Catalans Dragons. Further tries against Swinton, St. Helens and Hull FC helped him to a total of 14 tries in his rookie season.

After an impressive rookie season, Davies was handed the number 2 shirt at the Wigan club replacing the injured Dominic Manfredi. Davies scored Wigan's first try of the year with a diving effort against the Salford Red Devils followed by further tries against Widnes and Wakefield followed by a brace against Huddersfield to give him five tries in six appearances. His next try came four games later against Warrington at the Magic Weekend after Morgan Escare scooped up a loose pass and selflessly passed the ball to Davies rather than running to the line himself. Further tries came against Leeds, Warrington, Huddersfield, Wakefield and a 50m solo run against Castleford. After four games without scoring he scored a try in the derby against St Helens from a seemingly impossible position with two tacklers holding him up 2m from the line, but drove forward and reached out to plant the ball on the white line just after halftime to halt a potential Saints fightback. Known for his aggressive ball carrying he averaged 148m per game as well as averaging 3 tackle breaks and a clean break per match. Following his early season form he was called up to the England Knights Performance Squad before signing a new five year deal with the Wigan Warriors just a year after making his debut despite only recently signing a new improved deal.

He played in the 2018 Super League Grand Final victory over the Warrington Wolves at Old Trafford.

=== Catalans Dragons ===
In round 5 of the 2021 Super League season, he scored a hat-trick for Catalans in their victory over Wakefield Trinity. On 9 October, Davies played for Catalans in their 2021 Super League Grand Final defeat against St. Helens. On 14 October 2023, Davies played in Catalans 2023 Super League Grand Final loss against Wigan. Davies was sent to the sin bin during the second half of the match for a professional foul.

=== Hull Kingston Rovers ===
On 5 June 2024 it was reported that he had signed for Hull Kingston Rovers in the Super League on a three-year deal. On 7 June 2025, Davies played in Hull Kingston Rovers 8-6 2025 Challenge Cup final victory over Warrington. It was the clubs first major trophy in 40 years. Davies scored the winning try with less than two minutes remaining. On 18 September 2025, Davies played in Hull Kingston Rovers 2025 Final game of the regular season in victory over Warrington to claim the League Leaders Shield On 9 October 2025, Davies played in Hull Kingston Rovers 2025 Super League Grand Final victory over Wigan. On 19 February 2026, Davies played in Hull Kingston Rovers World Club Challenge victory against Brisbane.

== International career ==
In July 2018 he was selected in the England Knights Performance squad. Later that year he was selected for the England Knights on their tour of Papua New Guinea. He played against Papua New Guinea at the Lae Football Stadium. Davies also played against PNG at the Oil Search National Football Stadium.

On 25 June 2021 he made a try-scoring début for England in their 24-26 defeat to the Combined Nations All Stars, staged at the Halliwell Jones Stadium, Warrington, as part of England’s 2021 Rugby League World Cup preparation.

He scored his second try for England in the 10-30 win over France on 23 Oct 2021, staged in Perpignan.

== Career stats ==
Club	Season	Appearances	Tries	Goals	F/G	Points
Wigan Warriors	2017	25	14	-	-	56
Wigan Warriors	2018	27	13	-	-	52
Wigan Warriors	Total	52	27	-	-	108
Swinton Lions (Loan)	2017	4	1	-	-	4
Total		56	28	-	-	112
