= Benjamin Garcia =

France international rugby league footballer

Ben Garcia
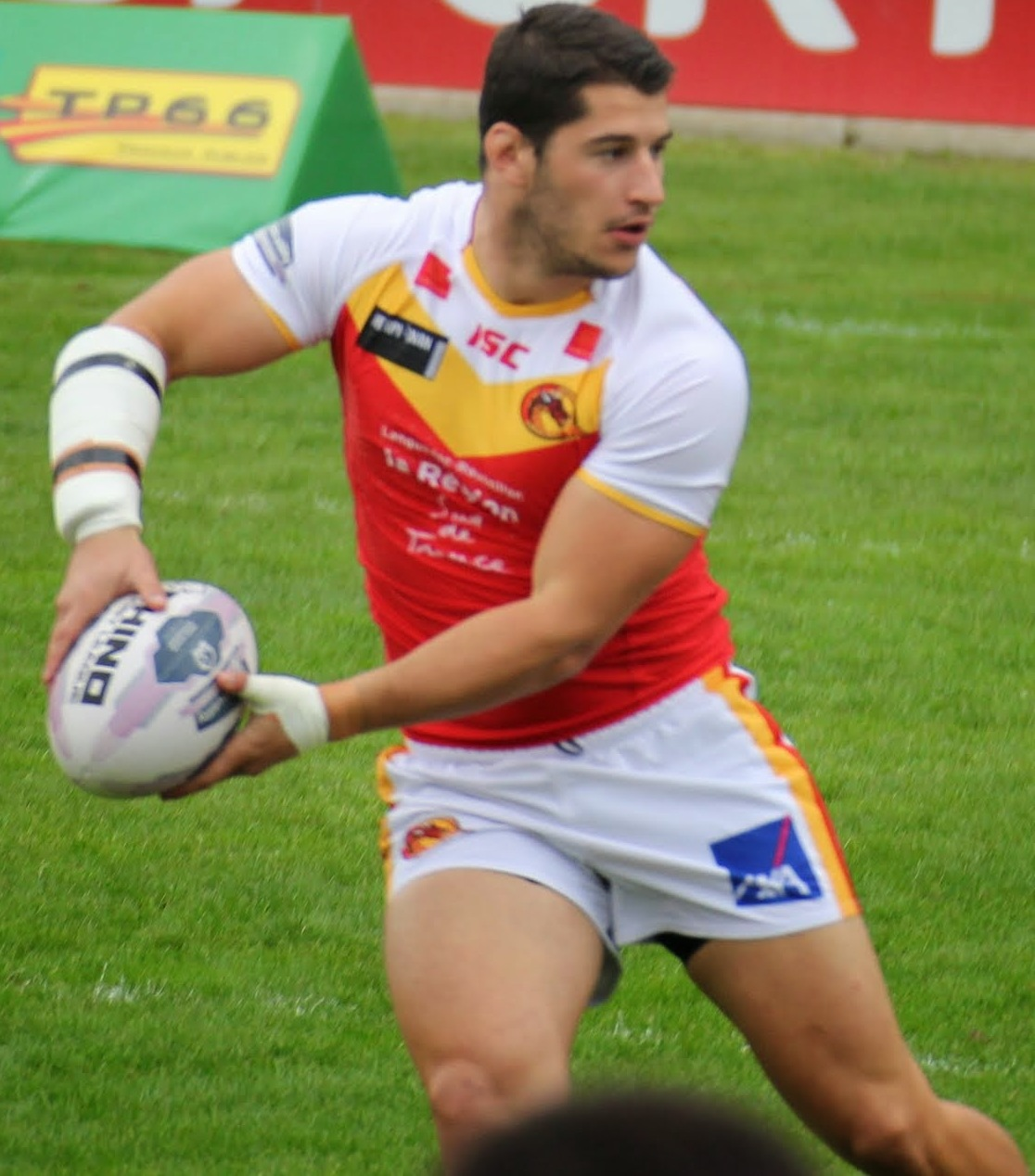

Personal information
- Full name: Benjamin Garcia
- Born: 5 April 1993 (age 33) Apt, Vaucluse, Provence-Alpes-Côte d'Azur, France
- Height: 5 ft 11 in (1.80 m)
- Weight: 15 st 6 lb (98 kg)

Playing information
- Position: Loose forward, Hooker, Second-row
Club
Years	Team	Pld	T	G	FG	P
2013–15	Catalans Dragons	49	10	0	0	40
2016	Penrith Panthers	0	0	0	0	0
2016–26	Catalans Dragons	238	33	1	0	134
	Total	287	43	1	0	174
Representative
Years	Team	Pld	T	G	FG	P
2013–26	France	20	3	0	0	12
- Source: As of 22 November 2026

Benjamin Garcia (born 5 April 1993) is a French former professional rugby league footballer who played as a loose forward, hooker or second-row for the Catalans Dragons in the Super League and France at international level.

He spent time with the Penrith Panthers as part of their squad during the 2016 NRL season.

== Background ==
He was born in Apt, Vaucluse, France. He is of Spanish and Algerian descent.

== Playing career ==
A SO Avignon junior and French junior international representative, Garcia moved to Australia to play for the Wynnum Manly Seagulls in the FOGS Colts Challenge in 2012. After winning the Seagulls' FOGS Colts player of the year award, Garcia moved into the Brisbane Broncos' National Youth Competition squad in 2013. In June 2013, he moved to the Catalans Dragons mid-season on a two-year contract, making his Super League debut against the Leeds Rhinos on 31 August 2013.

On 10 June 2015, Garcia signed a two-year contract with Penrith of the National Rugby League, starting in 2016. Garcia was named in Penrith's squad for the 2016 Auckland Nines, scoring a try in their match against the North Queensland Cowboys. He rejoined the Dragons in June 2016.

He played in the 2018 Challenge Cup Final victory over the Warrington Wolves at Wembley Stadium.

On 9 October 2021, Garcia played for Catalans in their 2021 Super League Grand Final defeat against St. Helens. On 14 October, Garcia played in Catalans 2023 Super League Grand Final loss against Wigan.

His last game was the 50-12 defeat to Wigan Warriors on 11 September 2026; he scored one goal in the 78th minute.

=== International career ===
On 24 October 2012, Garcia was called into France's train-on squad for the 2012 Autumn International Series. Following injuries to Clément Soubeyras and Mathias Pala, Garcia was called into France's squad for the 2013 Rugby League World Cup. He made his international debut on 27 October 2013 and played in three of France's Group B matches.

Garcia played for France in all three of their matches at the 2014 European Cup. He was unavailable for selection for the 2015 European Cup. Garcia played in France's lone international fixture of 2016, an end of year test match against England.

On 1 October 2026 he was named in the 2026 France World Cup squad
