= Bernard Guasch =

French businessman & former rugby league player (born 1960)

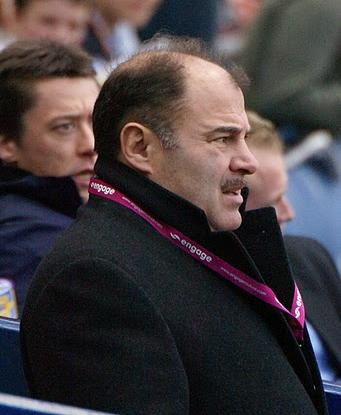
- Born: 3 April 1960 (age 65); Perpignan, France
- Title: Chairman of the Catalans Dragons
- Rugby league career

Playing information
- Position: Stand-off
Club
Years	Team	Pld	T	G	FG	P
1977–82	XIII Catalan
1982–89	Saint-Estève XIII
	Total	0	0	0	0	0

Bernard Guasch (born 3 April 1960) is a French former rugby league player, who played as stand-off and the current CEO of the Super League and French Rugby League Championship team, the Catalans Dragons and has been since their formation in 2001.

== Biography ==
Guasch's grandfather, José Guasch, was a Catalan politician, mayor of L'Espluga de Francolí during the Spanish Second Republic and, after fleeing to Northern Catalonia due to the outbreak of the Spanish Civil War, he was taken prisoner to the Argelers concentration camp. His parents and siblings also moved as refugees to join their grandfather. José became a rugby union player for USA Perpignan, notably disputing the final of the 1951-52 French Rugby Union Championship. Wanting to open a butchery, he asked for a loan for USAP, however, the latter refused and XIII Catalan supported his initiative if he played rugby league, which was what he did. He speaks Catalan fluently.

== Playing career ==
Guasch played as stand-off for XIII Catalan between 1977 and 1982 and for Saint-Estève XIII between 1982 and 1989. His brother, Bruno Guasch, played for XIII Catalan, and his son Joan Guasch played for Dragons Catalans and Saint-Estève XIII Catalan.

== The Catalans Dragons project ==
The Rugby League authorities complimented Guasch for his "leadership skills". In 2000, two great French clubs, XIII Catalan and Saint-Estève, merge to form Union Treiziste Catalane, which dominated the French Rugby League Championship, later the club became Catalans Dragons before its integration into Super League, becoming in 2006 the only French elite team in the Northern Hemisphere. It was a sports success as the club qualified for both the 2007 Challenge Cup final and the 2008 Super League play-offs, as well as an economic success the club achieved greater than 8,000 spectators at home, which convinced GL Events to invest into the club by taking shares and Nike became the kit supplier in 2009.

== Creation of a moral agreement with USA Perpignan? ==
Since the late 2010s, it was attributed to him the wish to "create a moral agreement with USA Perpignan, done like on the other side of the Channel". However, the rugby union club did not seem to answer concretely to this will.
