= Mickaël Goudemand =

France international rugby league footballer

Mickael Goudemand
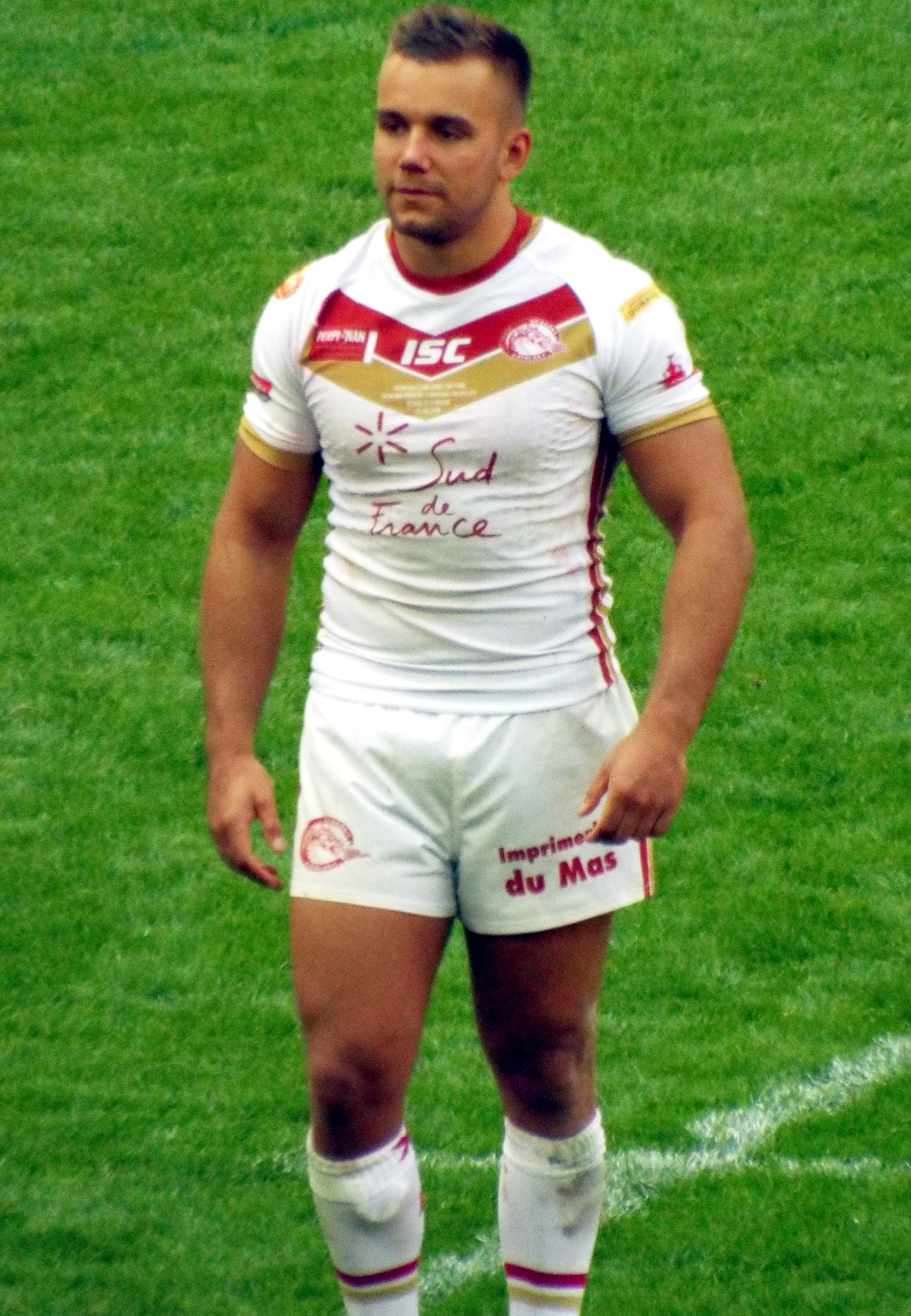

Personal information
- Full name: Mickaël Goudemand
- Born: 9 March 1996 (age 30) Avignon, Vaucluse, Provence-Alpes-Côte d'Azur, France
- Height: 5 ft 10 in (1.78 m)
- Weight: 15 st 6 lb (98 kg)

Playing information
- Position: Prop, Second-row
Club
Years	Team	Pld	T	G	FG	P
2010–16	SO Avignon	65	12	0	1	49
2017	Dewsbury Rams	8	1	0	0	4
2018–23	Catalans Dragons	99	11	0	0	44
2024	Leeds Rhinos	18	1	0	0	4
2025	Albi	15	1	0	0	4
2026	Newcastle Knights (NSW Cup)	2	0	0	0	0
2026–	Catalans Dragons	1	0	0	0	0
	Total	208	26	0	1	105
Representative
Years	Team	Pld	T	G	FG	P
2018–	France	12	1	0	0	4
- Source: As of 30 August 2026

Mickael Goudemand (born 9 March 1996) is a French professional rugby league footballer who plays as a second-row and loose forward for the Catalans Dragons in the Super League and France at international level.

Goudemand has previously played for SO Avignon in the Elite One Championship, Dewsbury Rams in the Championship, and for Newcastle Knights's NSW Cup side.

== Background ==
Goudemand was born in Vaucluse, Avignon, Provence-Alpes-Côte d'Azur, France.

== Playing career ==
=== Catalans Dragons ===
In 2018 he made his Challenge Cup début for the Dragons against Whitehaven. In May 2018 he made his Super League début for Catalans against the Leeds Rhinos, scoring a try.

He played in the 2018 Challenge Cup Final victory over the Warrington Wolves at Wembley Stadium.

On 9 October 2021, he played for Catalans in their 2021 Super League Grand Final defeat against St. Helens. Goudemand played 17 games for Catalans in 2023 Super League season but did not feature in their 2023 Super League Grand Final loss against Wigan.

=== Leeds Rhinos ===
On 27 June 2023 it was reported that he had signed with Leeds for the 2024 season on a two-year deal. He played 18 games for Leeds in the 2024 Super League season which saw the club finish 8th on the table.

=== Racing Club Albi XIII ===
On 28 Nov 2024 it was reported that he had signed for Albi in the Super XIII

=== Junee Diesels, Newcastle Knights (NSW Cup) ===
On 21 June 2025 it was reported that he had signed for Australian Group 9 Rugby League side Junee Diesels

He then joined Newcastle Knights's NSW Cup side for the 2026 season, making two appearances.

=== Catalans Dragons (return) ===
On 24 June 2026, it was reported that he had re-joined the Catalans Dragons on a deal until the end of the 2026 Super League season.
