= Paul Séguier =

France international rugby league footballer

Paul Seguier
Personal information
- Full name: Paul Séguier
- Born: 8 September 1997 (age 28) Albi, Tarn, Occitania, France
- Height: 6 ft 3 in (1.91 m)
- Weight: 15 st 7 lb (98 kg)

Playing information
- Position: Prop, Second-row
Club
Years	Team	Pld	T	G	FG	P
2016–22	Saint-Estève Catalan	39	7	0	0	28
2016–25	Catalans Dragons	93	7	0	0	28
2018(loan)	→ Toulouse Olympique	4	2	0	0	8
2019(loan)	→ Barrow Raiders	6	0	0	0	0
2025–	AS Carcassonne	0	0	0	0	0
	Total	142	16	0	0	64
Representative
Years	Team	Pld	T	G	FG	P
2021–	France	6	1	0	0	4
- Source: As of 27 October 2025

Paul Séguier (born 8 September 1997) is a French professional rugby league footballer who plays as a prop for the AS Carcassonne in the Super XIII and France at international level.

He has spent time on loan at Saint-Esteve in the Elite One Championship, and Toulouse Olympique and the Barrow Raiders in the Championship.

== Background ==
Seguier was born in Albi, France.

== Playing career ==
=== Catalans Dragons ===
Séguier is a French under 19 international. On 14 October 2023, he played in Catalans 2023 Super League Grand Final loss against Wigan.

=== AS Carcassonne ===
On 4 August 2025 it was reported that he had signed for AS Carcassonne in the Super XIII

=== International ===
He made his international debut on 25 October 2019 in the 62–4 defeat to the Junior Kangaroos.
