= Matt Whitley =

English professional rugby league footballer

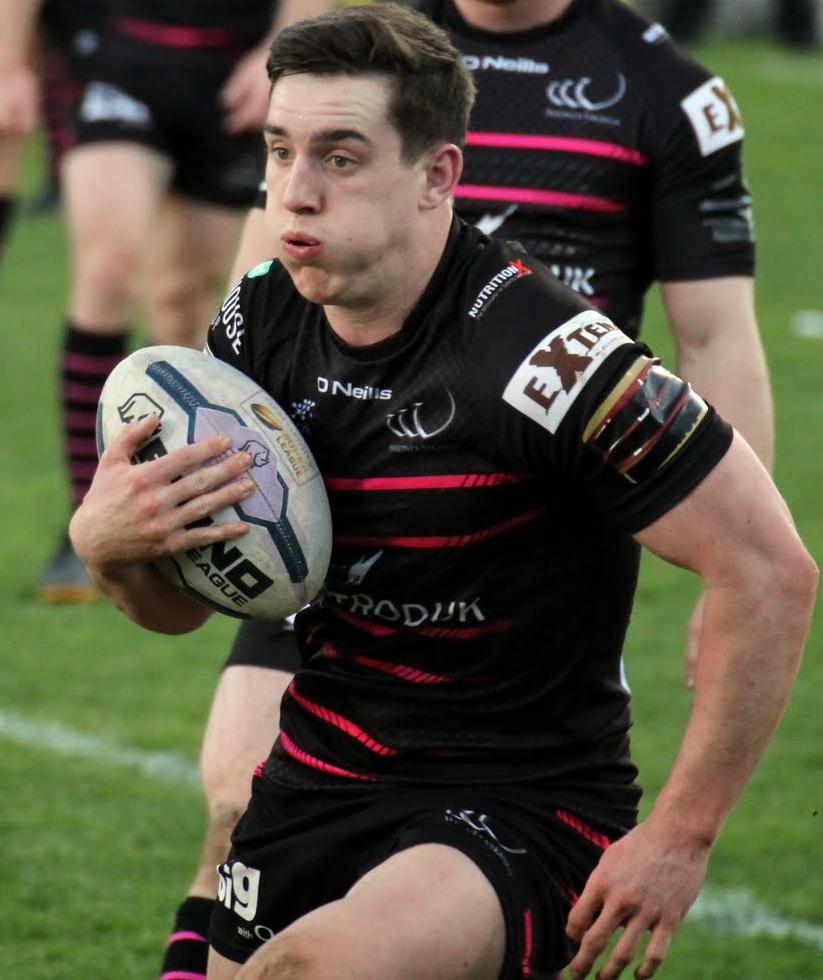

Personal information
- Full name: Matthew Whitley
- Born: 20 January 1996 (age 30) St Helens, Merseyside, England
- Height: 6 ft 0 in (1.82 m)
- Weight: 14 st 5 lb (91 kg)

Playing information
- Position: Second-row
Club
Years	Team	Pld	T	G	FG	P
2015–18	Widnes Vikings	100	20	0	0	80
2019–23	Catalans Dragons	103	35	0	0	140
2024–	St Helens	70	11	0	0	44
	Total	273	66	0	0	264
Representative
Years	Team	Pld	T	G	FG	P
2018–	England Knights	3	0	0	0	0
- Source: As of 12 August 2026

Matt Whitley (born 20 January 1996) is an English rugby league footballer who plays as a second-row forward for St Helens in the Super League and the England Knights at international level.

He previously played for the Widnes Vikings and Catalans Dragons in the Super League.

== Background ==
Whitley was born in Billinge, Merseyside, England.

== Career ==
=== Widnes Vikings ===
He made his début for Widnes on 10 April 2015 against the Warrington Wolves, and signed a full-time contract with the club two weeks later.

=== Catalans Dragons ===
On 9 October 2021, Whitley played for Catalans Dragons in their 2021 Super League Grand Final defeat against St. Helens. On 14 October 2023, Whitley played in Catalans 2023 Super League Grand Final loss against Wigan.

=== St Helens ===
On 18 October 2023, Whitley signed a two-year deal to join his boyhood club St Helens. In round 1 of the 2024 Super League season, Whitley made his club debut for St Helens and scored two tries as the club defeated the newly promoted London Broncos 40-4. Whitley played 20 matches for St Helens in the 2024 Super League season which saw the club finish sixth on the table. Whitley played 30 games for St Helens in the 2025 Super League season including the clubs 20-12 semi-final loss against Hull Kingston Rovers.

== International career ==
In July 2018 he was selected in the England Knights Performance squad. Later that year he was selected for the England Knights on their tour of Papua New Guinea. He played against Papua New Guinea at the Oil Search National Football Stadium.
