= Arthur Mourgue =

France international rugby league footballer

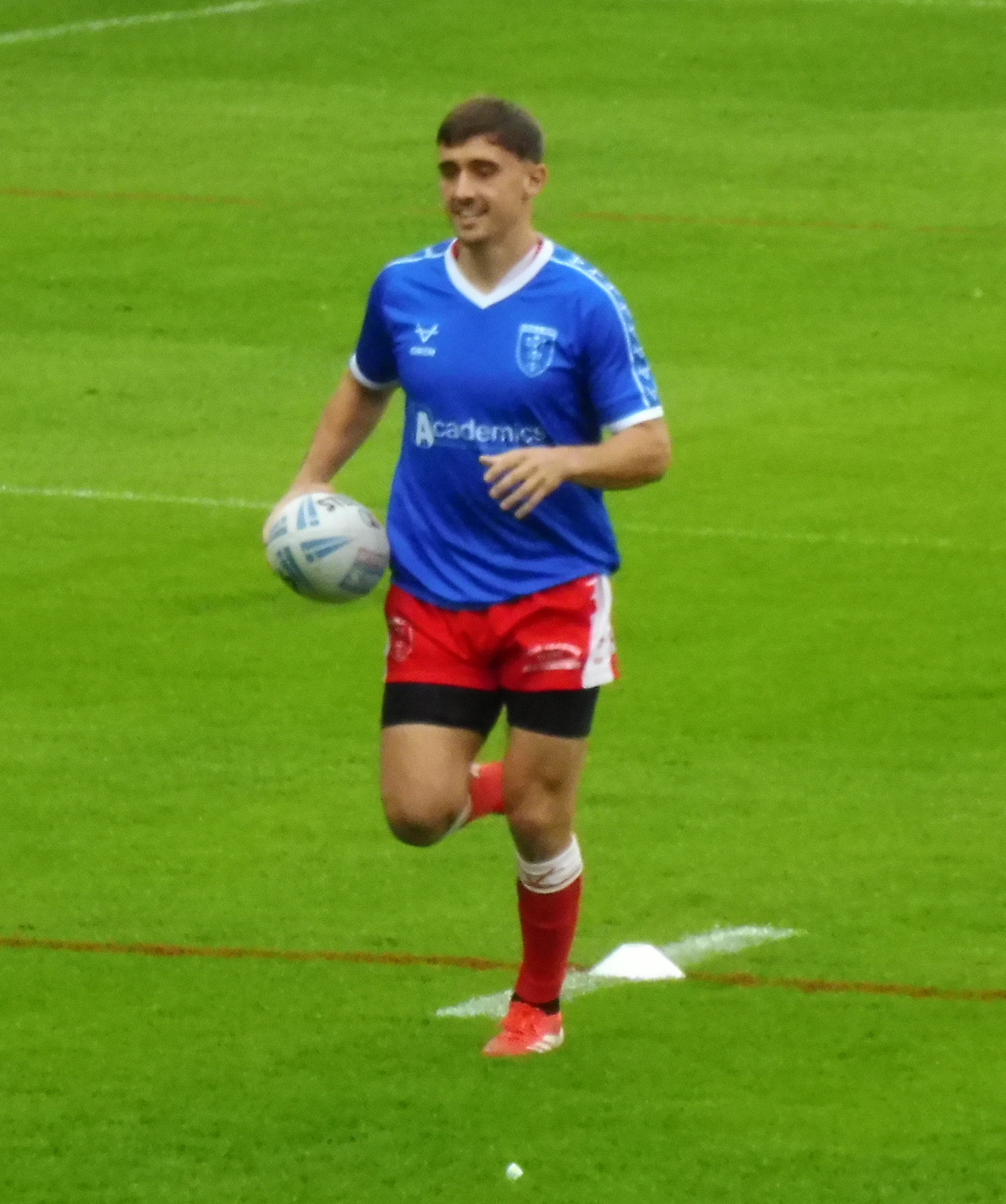

Personal information
- Born: 2 May 1999 (age 27) Saint-Étienne, Loire, Auvergne-Rhône-Alpes, France
- Height: 5 ft 9 in (1.75 m)
- Weight: 11 st 9 lb (74 kg)

Playing information
- Position: Scrum-half, Stand-off, Fullback
Club
Years	Team	Pld	T	G	FG	P
2018–25	Catalans Dragons	103	25	165	1	431
2025–	Hull Kingston Rovers	35	14	96	0	248
	Total	138	39	261	1	679
Representative
Years	Team	Pld	T	G	FG	P
2021–	France	12	2	21	1	52
- Source: As of 2 November 2026

Arthur Mourgue (born 2 May 1999) is a French professional rugby league footballer who plays as a scrum-half, stand-off and fullback for Hull Kingston Rovers in the Super League and France at international level.

He has previously played for Saint-Esteve in the Elite One Championship.

== Background ==
Mourgue was born in Saint-Étienne, Auvergne-Rhône-Alpes, France.

== Playing career ==
=== Catalans Dragons ===
In 2018, Mourgue made his début for the Catalans Dragons in the Super League against the Warrington Wolves. In 2021, Mourgue was part of the Catalans team that won the League Leaders' Shield. On 9 October, 2021, Mourgue played for Catalans in their 2021 Super League Grand Final defeat against St Helens. On 14 October, 2023, Mourgue played in Catalans' 2023 Super League Grand Final loss to the Wigan Warriors, coming off the interchange bench with 15 minutes remaining.

=== Hull Kingston Rovers ===
On 16 March, 2025, Mourgue joined Hull Kingston Rovers until the end of the 2028 season. At the 2025 Magic Weekend, Mourgue scored two tries and kicked nine goals as Hull Kingston Rovers defeated Salford 54-0. On 18 september 2025, Mourge Scored a crucial try in Hull Kingston Rovers victory against Warrington in the final game of the season to win the League Leaders Shield On 9 October 2025, Mourgue played in Hull Kingston Rovers 2025 Super League Grand Final victory over Wigan. On 19 February 2026, Mourgue played in Hull Kingston Rovers World Club Challenge victory against Brisbane.

== International career ==
He was selected in France 9s squad for the 2019 Rugby League World Cup 9s. In France's opening match of the 2021 Rugby League World Cup against Greece, Mourgue scored a try and kicked seven goals during Les Blues 34-12 victory.

He kicked four conversions in the 36-0 World Cup play-off win over Jamaica on 25 October 2025

On 1 October 2026 he was named in the 2026 France World Cup squad
