= Samisoni Langi =

France & Tonga international rugby league footballer

Soni Langi
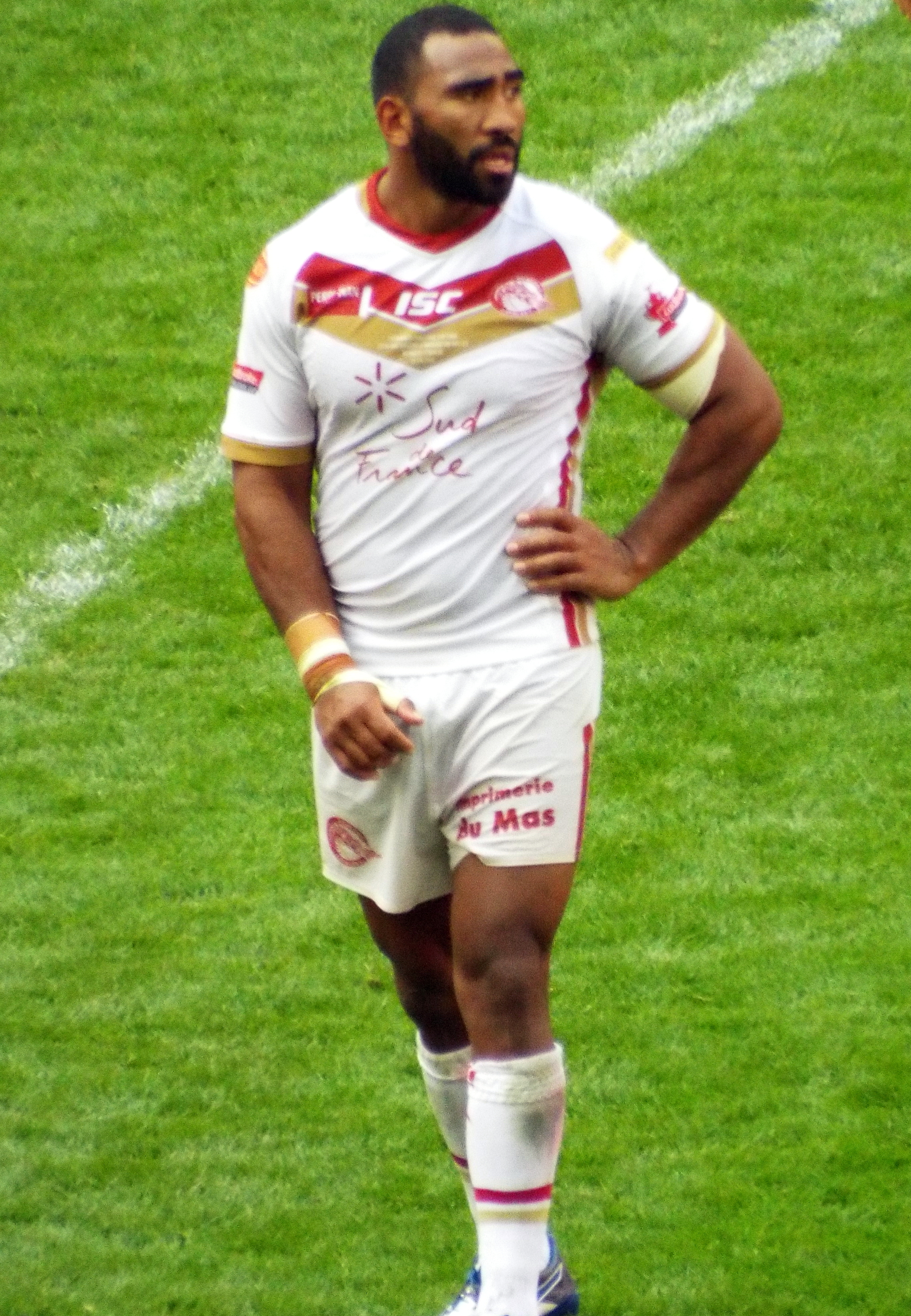

Personal information
- Full name: Samisoni Langi
- Born: 11 June 1993 (age 32); Auburn, New South Wales, Australia
- Height: 6 ft 0 in (1.84 m)
- Weight: 16 st 3 lb (103 kg)

Playing information
- Position: Five-eighth, Lock, Centre
Club
Years	Team	Pld	T	G	FG	P
2013–14	Sydney Roosters	3	0	0	0	0
2017	Leigh Centurions	9	1	0	0	4
2018–22	Catalans Dragons	107	27	0	0	108
2023	Wakefield Trinity	14	2	0	0	8
	Total	133	30	0	0	120
Representative
Years	Team	Pld	T	G	FG	P
2013–16	Tonga	7	2	11	0	30
2022–	France	4	0	0	0	0
- Source: As of 22 December 2023

Samisoni Langi (born 11 June 1993) is a professional rugby league footballer who last played as a centre and for Wakefield Trinity in the Super League.

Langi previously played for the Sydney Roosters in the NRL, and for the Leigh Centurions and the Catalans Dragons in the Super League, signing from the Penrith Panthers in June 2017. He has played for both Tonga and France at international level. He played as a stand-off earlier in his career.

== Early life ==
Langi was born in Auburn, New South Wales, Australia and is of Tongan descent.

He played his junior rugby league for the Berala Bears. While attending Trinity Catholic College, Auburn, he was selected to play for the NSW Combined Catholic Colleges Schoolboys and the Australian Schoolboys teams, both in 2011.

== Playing career ==
=== Sydney Roosters ===
Langi played for Canterbury-Bankstown Bulldogs in the National Youth Competition before being signed by the Sydney Roosters. On 20 April 2013, Langi made his international debut for Tonga in their Pacific International against Samoa, scoring two tries and kicking four goals in a man-of-the-match performance. Playing at centre, Langi made his NRL debut for the Roosters on 19 August 2013, in their round 23 match against the Wests Tigers. On 27 August 2013, Langi was named at five-eighth in the 2013 NYC Team of the Year. In 2016, Langi joined the South Sydney Rabbitohs' feeder team, the North Sydney Bears, in the NSW Cup.

=== Penrith Panthers ===
Langi joined the Penrith Panthers in 2017, playing for their NSW Cup team.

=== Leigh Centurions ===
In June 2017 he moved to Leigh on a deal lasting until the end of the season.

=== Catalans Dragons ===
In November 2017, Langi signed with the Catalans Dragons on a two-year deal. Langi played in the 2018 Challenge Cup Final victory over the Warrington Wolves at Wembley Stadium. On 9 October 2021, Langi played for Catalans Dragons in their 2021 Super League Grand Final defeat against St. Helens.

In the 2022 Super League season, Langi made 19 appearances including the clubs upset loss to Leeds in the elimination play off.

=== Wakefield Trinity ===
Langi then signed for Wakefield Trinity ahead of the 2023 Super League season and made his club debut in round 1 against his former club Catalans which saw Wakefield Trinity lose 24–38.

Langi played 14 games for Wakefield Trinity in the Super League XXVIII season as the club finished bottom of the table and were relegated to the RFL Championship which ended their 24-year stay in the top flight.

On 3 November 2023 it was reported that he had left Wakefield Trinity after completing just one year of his two-year deal.

== International career ==
=== Tonga ===
Langi was a member of Tonga's squad for the 2013 World Cup. He played in all three of Tonga's matches, kicking a total of 7 goals. On 19 October 2014, Langi played at five-eighth in Tonga's match against Papua New Guinea. On 2 May 2015, he played for Tonga in the 2015 Polynesian Cup against Samoa. He missed Tonga's first two conversion attempts, and the goal-kicking duties were given to Solomone Kata for the remainder of the match.

On 7 May 2016, Langi played for Tonga against Samoa in the 2016 Polynesian Cup, suffering a game-ending injury inside the opening 10 minutes. Langi was named as 18th man for Tonga's 2017 Pacific Test against Fiji.

=== France ===
In 2022, Langi switched his allegiance from Tonga where he represented them on 7 occasions, to play for France at this year's Rugby league World Cup, qualifying through residency. Langi made his debut for France in the opening round of the 2021 Rugby League World Cup against Greece.
