= Julian Bousquet =

France international rugby league footballer

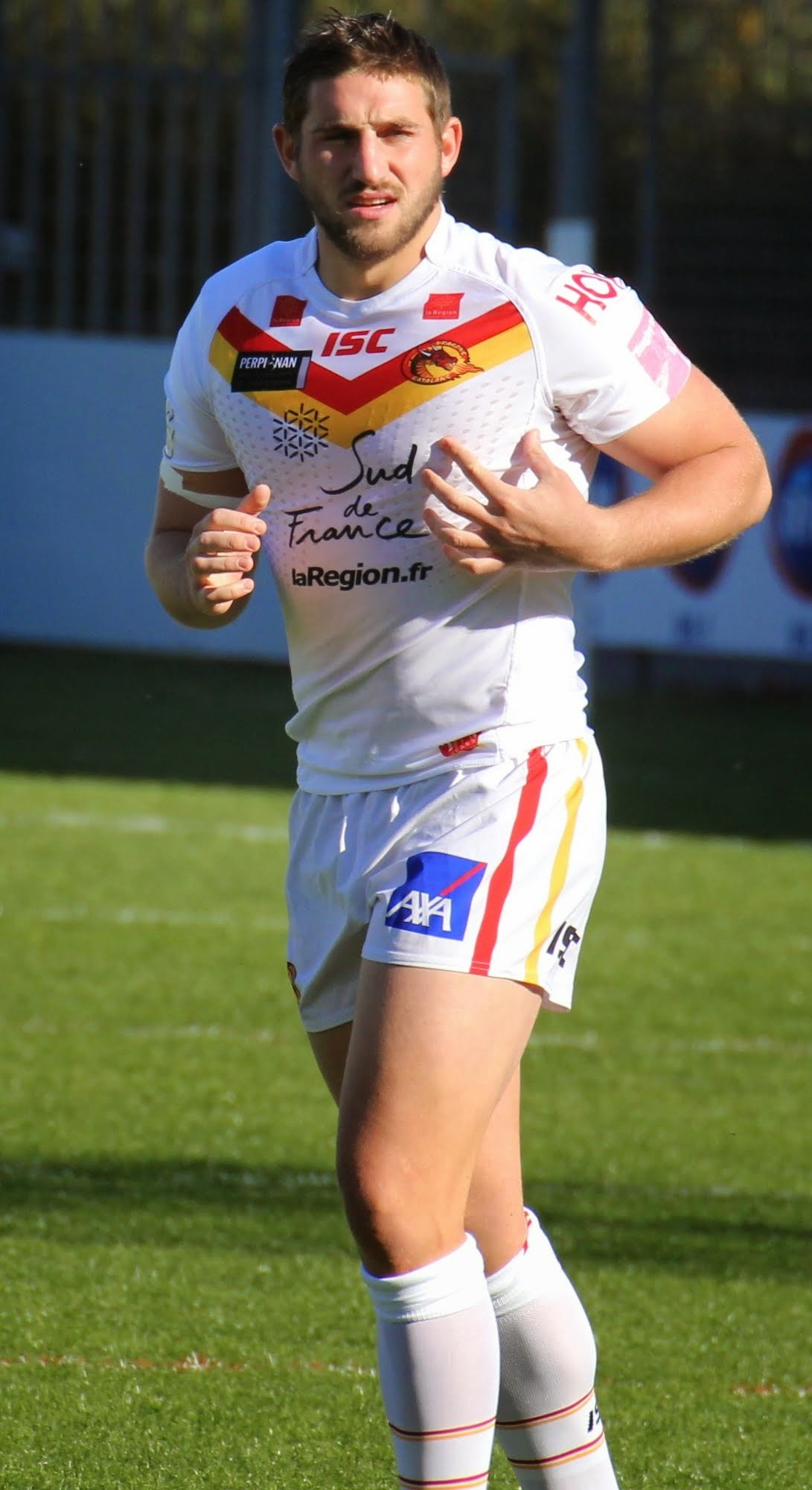

Personal information
- Born: 8 July 1991 (age 35) Fabrezan, Aude, Occitania, France
- Height: 6 ft 4 in (1.93 m)
- Weight: 18 st 6 lb (117 kg)

Playing information
- Position: Prop
Club
Years	Team	Pld	T	G	FG	P
2009–11	Lézignan Sangliers	33	4	0	0	16
2012–	Catalans Dragons	323	35	0	0	136
	Total	356	39	0	0	152
Representative
Years	Team	Pld	T	G	FG	P
2011–	France	19	2	0	0	8
- Source: As of 20 November 2026

Julian Bousquet (born 8 July 1991) is a French professional rugby league footballer who plays as a prop for the Catalans Dragons in the Super League and at international level for France.

He previously played in the Elite One Championship for the Lézignan Sangliers.

== Background ==
Bousquet was born in Fabrezan, Occitanie, France.

== Club career ==
Bousquet began his career at Lézignan Sangliers. He moved to Catalans Dragons and made his debut in 2012. In early 2013 he was involved in a controversial incident during a match against Salford when he knocked Théo Fages unconscious with an illegal challenge, receiving a red card and subsequently being banned for four matches.

On 30 May 2015, Bousquet signed an extension to his Catalans contract.

He played in the 2018 Challenge Cup Final victory over the Warrington Wolves at Wembley Stadium.

On 9 October 2021, Bousquet played for Catalans in their 2021 Super League Grand Final defeat against St. Helens. On 14 October 2023, Bousquet played in Catalans 2023 Super League Grand Final loss against Wigan.

== International career ==
Bousquet made his début for France as a Substitute in the 46–10 victory over Scotland in the 2011 Autumn International Series match at Stade Gilbert Brutus, Perpignan on Saturday 29 October 2011.

Bousquet played in all three French matches of the 2014 European Cup campaign.

Bousquet appeared for France again in the 2015 European Cup tournament. He also played for France in their mid-tournament test-match against England. He was a part what was considered a 'weakened' French side due to injury and it showed with an appalling showing against their opponents.

Bousquet played in France's lone international fixture of 2016, an end of year test match against England in Avignon.

Bousquet was named in the 24 man squad to head to Australia for the 2026 Rugby League World Cup.
