= Josh Drinkwater =

Australian rugby league footballer

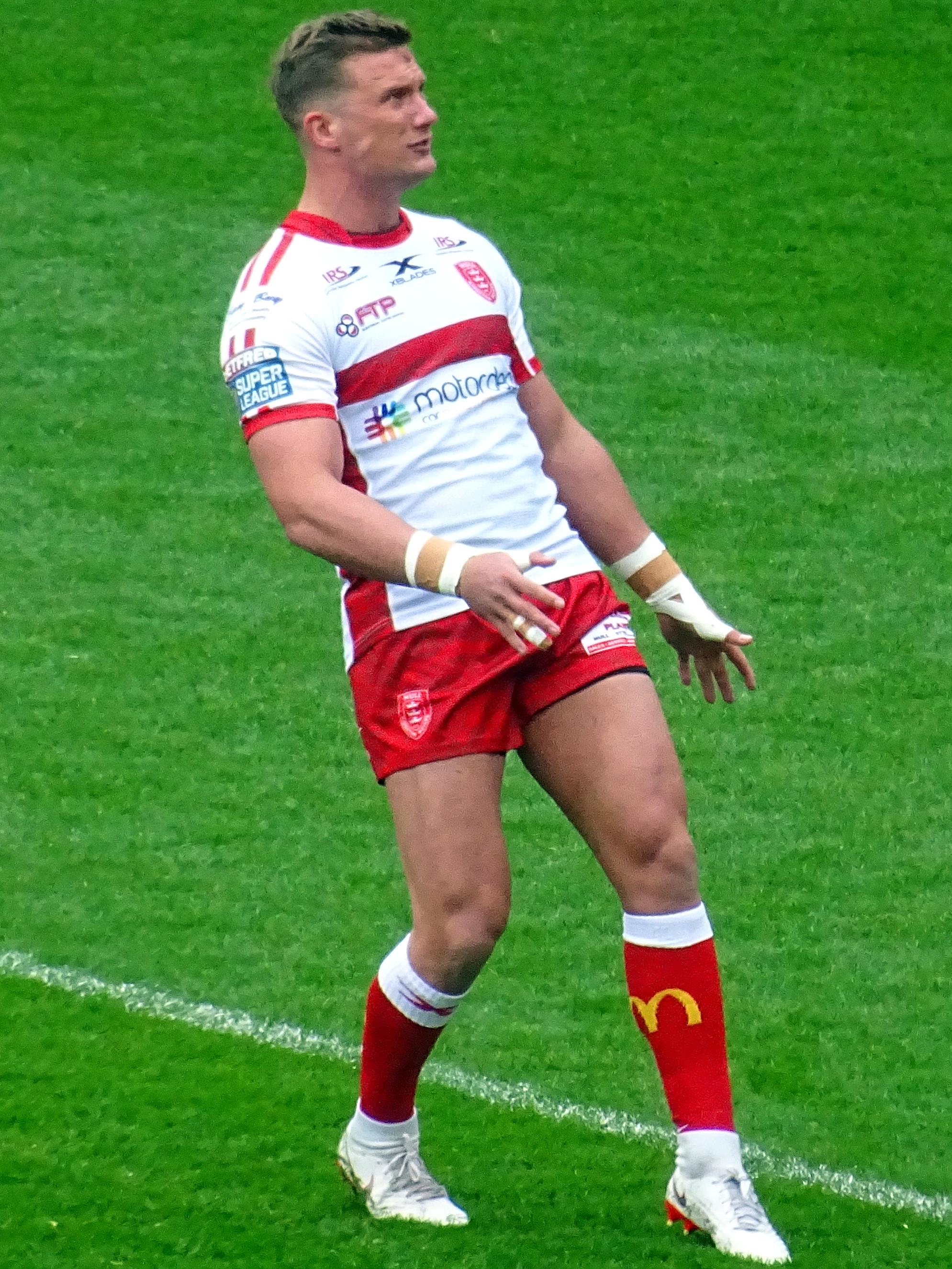

Personal information
- Full name: Joshua Drinkwater
- Born: 15 June 1993 (age 33) Sydney, New South Wales, Australia

Playing information
- Height: 5 ft 10 in (1.79 m)
- Weight: 13 st 8 lb (86 kg)
- Position: Scrum-half, Stand-off
Club
Years	Team	Pld	T	G	FG	P
2013	St. George Illawarra	4	0	0	1	1
2014	London Broncos	25	5	58	0	136
2015	Wests Tigers	1	0	0	0	0
2016–17	Leigh Centurions	43	12	29	2	108
2018	Catalans Dragons	21	9	75	0	186
2019	Hull Kingston Rovers	32	7	6	0	40
2020–22	Catalans Dragons	64	8	7	0	44
2023–24	Warrington Wolves	50	5	10	0	40
2025–26	Oldham	56	17	73	1	215
	Total	296	63	258	4	770
Representative
Years	Team	Pld	T	G	FG	P
2016	NSW Residents	1	1	0	0	4
- Relatives: Scott Drinkwater (brother)

Joshua Drinkwater (born 15 June 1992) is an Australian former professional rugby league footballer who last played as a scrum-half or stand-off for Oldham RLFC in the RFL Championship.

He has previously played for the St. George Illawarra Dragons and the Wests Tigers in the NRL. He has also played for the London Broncos, Leigh Centurions, Catalans Dragons and Hull Kingston Rovers in the Super League.

Drinkwater won the 2018 Challenge Cup with Catalans.

== Background ==
Drinkwater was born in Sydney, New South Wales, Australia, and is of German descent. He is the brother of fellow rugby league footballer, Scott Drinkwater who plays for the North Queensland Cowboys in the National Rugby League.

Drinkwater played his junior football for the Terrigal Sharks, where he partnered best friend Josh English in the halves, before being signed by the Manly-Warringah Sea Eagles.

== Playing career ==
=== National Youth Competition ===
From 2010 to 2012, Drinkwater played for the Manly Warringah Sea Eagles' National Youth Competition (NYC) team.

He was Manly's NYC top point-scorer in 2012, with 137 points from 10 tries, 48 goals and 1 field goal.

On 4 September 2012, he signed a two-year contract with the St. George Illawarra Dragons starting in 2013, where he was seen as a “possible saviour to a club reeling in the post-Wayne Bennett era.”

=== St. George Illawarra Dragons (2013) ===
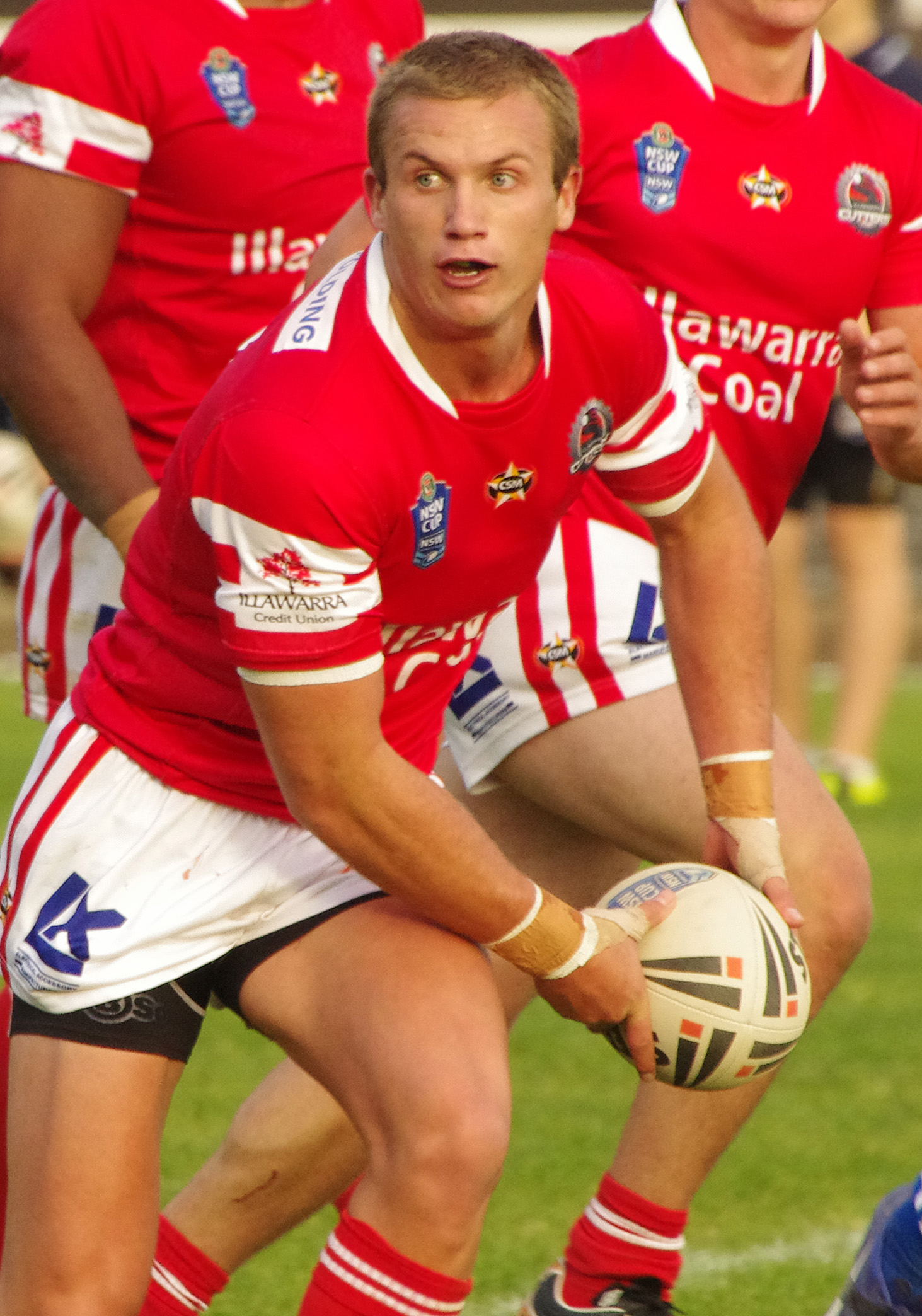
Drinkwater playing for the Illawarra Cutters in 2013

In round 5 of the 2013 NRL season, Drinkwater made his National Rugby League début for the St. George Illawarra Dragons against the Newcastle Knights.

He finished off his début year in the NRL having only played in four games.

=== London Broncos ===
In February 2014, Drinkwater joined the London Broncos effective immediately for the rest of the season in a straight swap for Michael Witt, after being released from the final year of his St. George Illawarra contract.

He scored 136 points for the London Broncos, but the club managed just one victory for the entire Super League season.

=== Wests Tigers ===
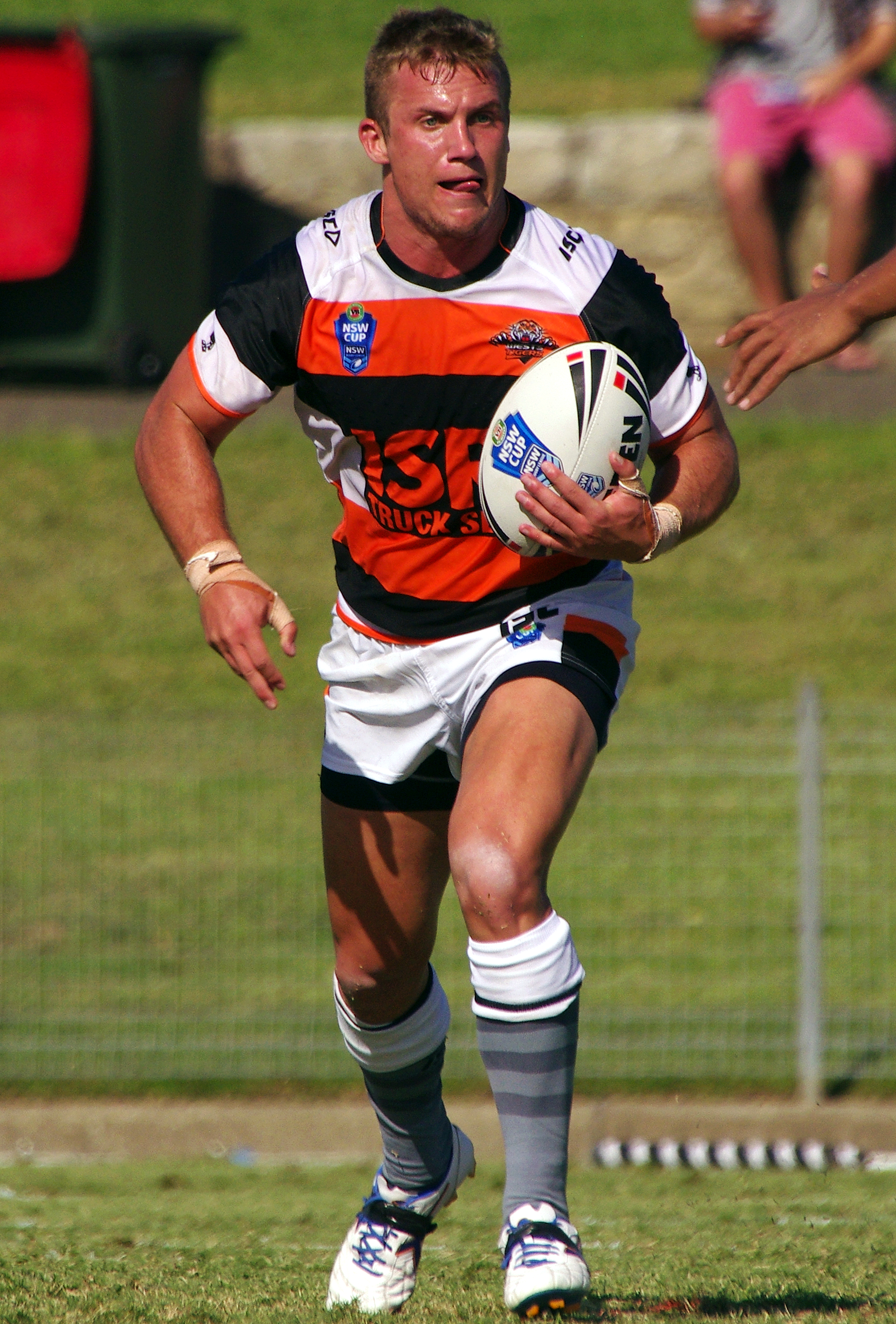
Drinkwater playing for the West Tigers in 2015

On 5 November 2014, he signed a two-year contract with the Wests Tigers, commencing in 2015.

Drinkwater was initially signed as a back-up for halves Mitchell Moses and Luke Brooks. Drinkwater commented on the situation saying, "I know I'm behind those boys, Jason Taylor told me straight away that "Mitch" and "Brooksy" were going to start the year in the first-grade team. I just want to come here, play good footy and if something happens and Jason Taylor calls my name, I've got to take my opportunity".

In round 17 of the 2015 NRL season, Drinkwater made his Tigers' début against the Parramatta Eels.

=== Leigh Centurions ===
On 17 May 2016, he was released from his contract at the Wests Tigers to take up an opportunity with the Leigh Centurions in the Championship.

Drinkwater subsequently went onto help his new club gain promotion in 2016, back to the top-flight of English rugby league.

Drinkwater left the Leigh Centurions after a two-year stay at the club, following relegation from the Super League via the Million Pound Game in a loss to the Catalans Dragons at the end of the 2017 season.

=== Western Suburbs Magpies ===
Drinkwater joined Intrust Super Premiership NSW side the Western Suburbs Magpies for the 2018 season.

=== Catalans Dragons ===
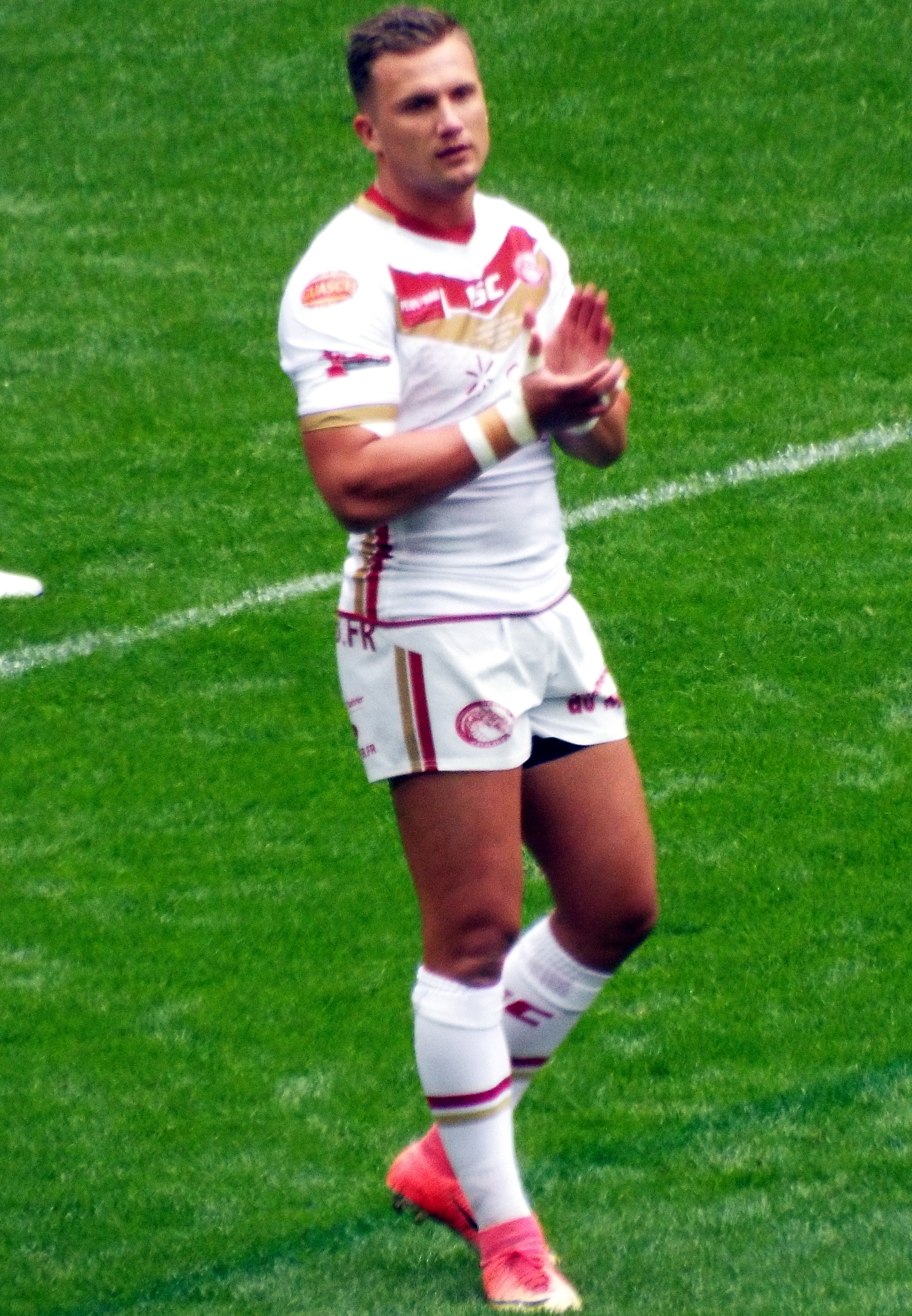
Drinkwater playing for the Catalans Dragons in 2018

On 24 April 2018, Drinkwater signed a one-year deal to join the Catalans Dragons.

On 25 August 2018, Drinkwater was part of the Dragons' historic 2018 Challenge Cup Final triumph over the Warrington Wolves.

Securing the clubs first-ever piece of silverware, Drinkwater who started the game at halfback went onto kick four goals (8 points), subsequently helping the Perpignan based side secure a 20–14 victory.

=== Hull Kingston Rovers ===
On 23 December 2018, it was revealed that he had signed a one-year deal to play for Hull Kingston Rovers in the Super League.

On 9 January 2019, Drinkwater received the number 24 jersey ahead of the start of the Super League season.

On 13 January 2019, Drinkwater made his non-competitive Hull Kingston Rovers' début in a pre-season friendly against the Widnes Vikings, Drinkwater claimed a 30–16 victory with his new club.

Drinkwater made his first competitive appearance for Hull Kingston Rovers in round 1 of the 2019 Super League season, Drinkwater who added 6 points with the boot recorded a thrilling 18–16 victory over cross-city rivals Hull F.C. at Craven Park.

Drinkwater also subsequently picked up the Sky Sports' 'Man of the Match Award.'

Drinkwater played his 100th career game on 10 March 2019, in a 6–10 victory over Wakefield Trinity at Belle Vue.

On 4 April 2019, Drinkwater opened his try scoring account for Hull Kingston Rovers in a 45-26 Super League home victory over the Leeds Rhinos.

Drinkwater scored a brace of tries on 31 May 2019, in Hull Kingston Rovers' 22-28 Challenge Cup Quarter Final defeat by the Warrington Wolves.

=== Catalans Dragons (rejoin) ===
On 31 October 2019, it was announced that Drinkwater was re-joining Catalans Dragons.

On 9 October 2021, Drinkwater played for Catalans in their 2021 Super League Grand Final defeat against St. Helens.

=== Warrington Wolves ===
On 23 November 2022, Drinkwater signed a two-year deal to join Warrington.

Drinkwater warming up for Oldham in 2026

Drinkwater played 24 games for Warrington in the 2023 Super League season as Warrington finished sixth on the table and qualified for the playoffs. Drinkwater played in the clubs elimination playoff loss against St Helens. On 8 June 2024, Drinkwater played in Warrington's 2024 Challenge Cup final defeat against Wigan.

Drinkwater played 23 games for Warrington in the 2024 Super League season as the club reached the semi-final before losing to Hull Kingston Rovers.

=== Oldham RLFC ===
On 27 November 2024 it was announced by chairman Bill Quinn that he had signed for Oldham RLFC in the RFL Championship on a one year deal.

On 14 September 2026 it was reported that he would be leaving Oldham RLFC at the end of the 2026 season to take up a coaching role

== Honours ==
=== Club (Catalans Dragons 2018) ===
- Challenge Cup (1): 2018
