= 2008 Rugby League World Cup Group B =

Group B of the 2008 Rugby League World Cup was one of the three groups of teams that competed in the 2008 Rugby League World Cup. Group B consisted of three teams: Fiji, Scotland and France. After all teams played had each other once, only Fiji advanced to 2008 Rugby League World Cup knockout stage.

== Standings ==
In the knockout stage, Fiji played in the qualifying final while Scotland and France played for 7th and 9th place respectively.

Pos	Team	Pld	W	D	L	PF	PA	PD	Pts	Qualification
1	Fiji	2	1	0	1	58	24	+34	2	Advance to knockout stage
2	Scotland	2	1	0	1	36	52	−16	2	
3	France	2	1	0	1	42	60	−18	2	

== Matches ==
=== France vs Scotland ===
26 October 2008
17:25 ADST (UTC+11:00)

France	36–18	Scotland
Tries: Jared Taylor 16' c Jérôme Guisset 28' c, 75' c John Wilson 33' c Sébastien Raguin 54' c Christophe Moly 80' c Goals: Thomas Bosc (6)	Report	Tries: Jon Steel 20' c Oliver Wilkes 46' c Dean Colton 62' c Goals: Danny Brough (3)

Canberra Stadium, Canberra
Attendance: 9,287
Referee: Leon Williamson (New Zealand)

France	Scotland

FB	1	Jared Taylor
RW	2	Justin Murphy
RC	3	John Wilson
LC	4	Sébastien Raguin
LW	5	Teddy Sadaoui
SO	6	Thomas Bosc
SH	7	Maxime Grésèque
PR	8	Adel Fellous
HK	9	Julien Rinaldi
PR	10	Olivier Elima
SR	11	Jérôme Guisset (c)
SR	12	Éric Anselme
LF	13	Grégory Mounis
Substitutions:
IC	14	James Wynne
IC	15	Rémi Casty
IC	16	Jamal Fakir
IC	17	Christophe Moly
Coach:
(Australia) John Monie

FB	1	Michael Robertson
RW	2	Dean Colton
RC	3	Gavin Cowan
LC	4	Kevin Henderson
LW	5	Jon Steel
SO	6	John Duffy
SH	7	Danny Brough (c)
PR	8	Scott Logan
HK	9	Ian Henderson
PR	10	Paul Jackson
SR	11	Duncan MacGillivray
SR	12	Iain Morrison
LF	13	Lee Patterson
Substitutions:
IC	14	Andrew Henderson
IC	15	Oliver Wilkes
IC	16	Chris Armit
IC	17	Mick Nanyn
Coach:
(England) Steve McCormack

=== Fiji vs France ===
1 November 2008
17:25 ADST (UTC+11:00)

Fiji	42–6	France
Tries: Akuila Uate (3); Jarryd Hayne (2); Iowane Divavesi; Semisi Tora; Goals: Wes Naiqama (7)	Report	Tries: John Wilson Goals: Thomas Bosc (1)

Wollongong Showground, Wollongong
Attendance: 9,213
Referee: Ashley Klein (England)
Player of the Match: Jarryd Hayne (Fiji)

Fiji	France

FB	1	Jarryd Hayne
LW	2	Semi Tadulala
RC	3	Wes Naiqama (c)
LC	4	Daryl Millard
RW	5	Akuila Uate
FE	6	Alipate Noilea
HB	7	Aaron Groom
PR	8	Iowane Divavesi
HK	9	Waisale Sukanaveita
PR	10	Ilisoni Vonomateiratu
SR	11	Ashton Sims
SR	12	Sevanaia Koroi
LK	13	Jayson Bukuya
Substitutions:
IC	14	Osea Sadrau
IC	15	James Storer
IC	16	Nick Bradley-Qalilawa
IC	17	Semisi Tora
Coach:
(Fiji) Joe Dakuitoga

FB	1	Jared Taylor
RW	2	Justin Murphy
RC	3	John Wilson
LC	4	Sébastien Raguin
LW	5	Dimitri Pelo
SO	6	Thomas Bosc
SH	7	Christophe Moly
PR	8	Jean-Christophe Borlin
HK	9	James Wynne
PR	10	Olivier Elima
SR	11	Jérôme Guisset (c)
SR	12	Teddy Sadaoui
LF	13	Grégory Mounis
Substitutions:
IC	14	Laurent Carrasco
IC	15	Rémi Casty
IC	16	Jamal Fakir
IC	17	Maxime Grésèque
Coach:
(Australia) John Monie

=== Scotland vs Fiji ===
5 November 2008
19:55 ADST (UTC+11:00)

Scotland	18–16	Fiji
Tries: Jon Steel; Michael Robertson; Oliver Wilkes; Goals: Danny Brough (3)	Report	Tries: Semi Tadulala (2); Jason Bukuya Goals: Wes Naiqama (2)

Central Coast Stadium, Gosford
Attendance: 9,720
Referee: Leon Williamson (New Zealand)

Scotland	Fiji

FB	1	Michael Robertson
RW	2	Wade Liddell
RC	3	Mick Nanyn
LC	4	Kevin Henderson
LW	5	Jon Steel
SO	6	John Duffy
SH	7	Danny Brough (c)
PR	8	Oliver Wilkes
HK	9	Ben Fisher
PR	10	Scott Logan
SR	11	Duncan MacGillivray
SR	12	Chris Armit
LF	13	Ian Henderson
Substitutions:
IC	14	Andrew Henderson
IC	15	Gareth Morton
IC	16	Paul Jackson
IC	17	Neil Lowe
Coach:
(England) Steve McCormack

FB	1	Jarryd Hayne
LW	2	Semi Tadulala
RC	3	Wes Naiqama (c)
LC	18	Sevanaia Koroi
RW	5	Akuila Uate
FE	15	Nick Bradley-Qalilawa
HB	7	Aaron Groom
PR	8	Iowane Divavesi
HK	9	Waisale Sukanaveita
PR	10	Ilisoni Vonomateiratu
SR	11	Ashton Sims
SR	17	Semisi Tora
LK	13	Jayson Bukuya
Substitutions:
IC	12	Osea Sadrau
IC	19	Jone Wesele
IC	20	Jone Macilai
IC	22	Kaliova Nauqe Tani
Coach:
(Fiji) Joe Dakuitoga
