= 2008 Rugby League World Cup knockout stage =

Rugby league tournament stage

The 2008 Rugby League World Cup knockout stage took place after the group stage of the 2008 Rugby League World Cup and culminated in the 2008 Rugby League World Cup final.

== Bracket ==
Quarter-final
B1	Fiji	30
C1	Ireland	14

Semi-finals
A2	New Zealand	32
A3	England	22
A1	Australia	52
Fiji	0

Final
New Zealand	34
Australia	20

== Matches ==
=== 7th-place play-off: Scotland vs Tonga ===
This was the lowest-attended match of the tournament, however it was filled to capacity for a ground that had never seen top-level rugby league before.

8 November 2008
16:00 AEST (UTC+10:00)

Scotland	0–48	Tonga
	Report	Tries: Vuna (2); Mateo; Paea; Uaisele; Williams; Talanoa; Jennings; Goals: Williams (7); Paea

Browne Park, Rockhampton
Attendance: 5,930
Referee: Shane Hayne (Australia)

Scotland	Tonga

FB	1	Michael Robertson
RW	2	Wade Liddell
RC	3	Mick Nanyn
LC	4	Kevin Henderson
LW	5	Gavin Cowan
SO	6	Dave McConnell
SH	7	John Duffy
PR	8	Oliver Wilkes
HK	9	Ben Fisher (c)
PR	10	Scott Logan
SR	11	Iain Morrison
SR	12	Duncan MacGillivray
LF	13	Ian Henderson
Substitutions:
IC	14	Andrew Henderson
IC	15	Paddy Coupar
IC	16	Chris Armit
IC	17	Jack Howieson
Coach:
(England) Steve McCormack

FB	1	Fetuli Talanoa
RW	2	Cooper Vuna
RC	3	Michael Jennings
LC	4	Toshio Laiseni
LW	5	Etu Uaisele
FE	6	Feleti Mateo
HB	7	Eddie Paea
PR	8	Antonio Kaufusi
HK	9	Tevita Leo-Latu
PR	11	Lopini Paea (c)
SR	12	Richard Fa'aoso
SR	13	Andrew Emelio
LK	20	Tony Williams
Substitutions:
IC	10	Mickey Paea
IC	15	Sam Moa
IC	16	Kim Uasi
IC	19	Willie Manu
Coach:
(Australia) Jim Dymock

==== 9th-place play-off: France vs Samoa ====
9 November 2008
17:25 ADST (UTC+11:00)

France	10–42	Samoa
Tries: Guisset; Planas; Goals: Bosc	Report	Tries: Te'o (2); Utai; Meli; Carmont; Taulapapa; Roberts; T. Puletua; Goals: Roberts (3); Paulo (2)

Penrith Stadium, Sydney
Attendance: 8,028
Referee: Thierry Alibert (France)

France	Samoa

FB	1	Jared Taylor
RW	2	Sébastien Planas
RC	3	Teddy Sadaoui
LC	4	Sébastien Raguin
LW	5	Dimitri Pelo
SO	6	John Wilson
SH	7	Thomas Bosc
PR	8	Jérôme Guisset (c)
HK	9	Christophe Moly
PR	10	Adel Fellous
SR	11	Jamal Fakir
SR	12	Éric Anselme
LF	13	Grégory Mounis
Substitutions:
IC	14	Olivier Elima
IC	15	Laurent Carrasco
IC	16	Mathieu Griffi
IC	17	Jean-Philippe Baile
Coach:
(Australia) John Monie

FB	1	Tangi Ropati
RW	2	Matt Utai
RC	3	Francis Meli
LC	4	George Carmont
LW	5	Misi Taulapapa
FE	6	Ben Roberts
HB	7	Alby Talipeau
PR	8	Kylie Leuluai
HK	9	Terrence Seu Seu
PR	10	Frank Puletua
SR	11	Ben Te'o
SR	12	Tony Puletua (c)
LK	13	Harrison Hansen
Substitutions:
IC	14	Wayne McDade
IC	15	Ali Lauitiiti
IC	16	Joseph Paulo
IC	17	Smith Samau
Coach:
(New Zealand) John Ackland

=== Quarter-final: Fiji vs Ireland ===
Fiji and Ireland, who had finished at the top of their respective groups, faced off at Queensland's Gold Coast. At stake was the chance to play Australia in the semi-final. Fiji had lost prop Iowane Divavesi to a two-match ban for tripping just hours before the match.

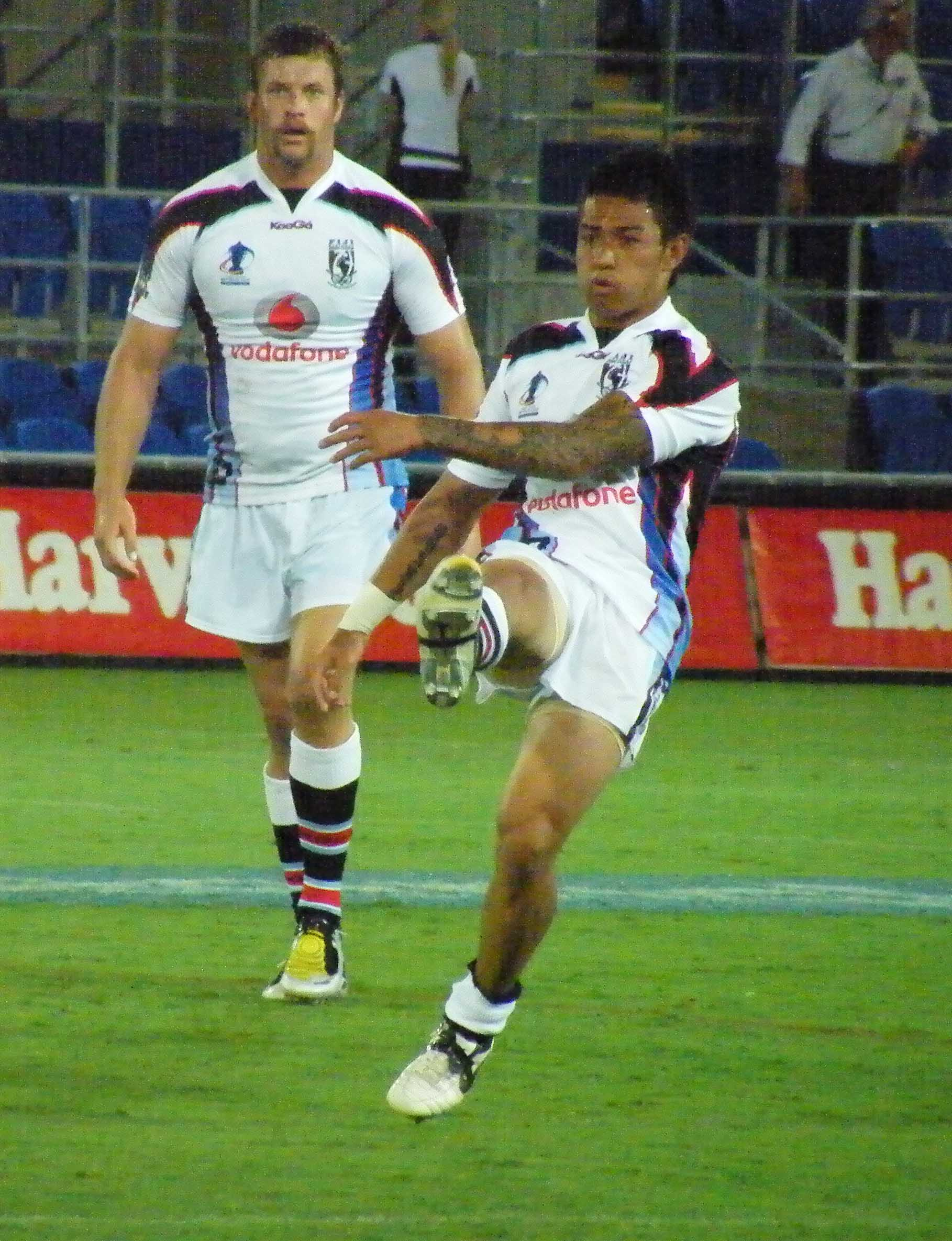
Man-of-the-match, Aaron Groom with Ashton Sims in the background.

Amhrán na bhFiann was performed as the Ireland team's national anthem before the match. Fiji opened the scoring early with their captain Wes Naiqama from the half way line finding space down the right side of the field and scoring on the 2-minute mark. He then converted his own try so the score was 6–0. About 5 minutes later Ireland responded with their own 50-metre runaway try down the right side thanks to winger Damien Blanch. Pat Richards kicked the extras so the scores were level at 6–6. In the 25th minute Fiji were penalised just over 40 metres out from their own line and the Irish decided to take the shot at goal. Richards' attempt went wide so the score remained unchanged. Fiji scored again about five minutes later when from close-range, Akuila Uate ran from dummy half on his wing infield to find a gap in the defence and score near the uprights. Naiqama's conversion was successful so Fiji led 12 - 6. It was Ireland's turn to score again and they did so in the 46th minute when from within Fiji's 10-metre line, captain Scott Grix decided to run from first receiver, charging through a gap and getting the ball down. Richards' kick to level the scores hit the upright and missed, so Fiji remained two points ahead at 12 - 10 and this was the score until half-time.

About a minute into the second half Fiji were up at their opponents' try-line when hooker James Storer ran from dummy half and crashed over but was held up by the defence. After repeated raids on the Irish try-line and despite some enormous drop-outs from Pat Richards, Fiji kept on coming and scored just on 55 minutes, when from close range Jason Bukuya found a gap in the defence and reached out to plant the ball down. Naiqama's conversion was successful so Fiji led 18 - 10. A few minutes later Fiji were again down close to Ireland's try-line when they got a penalty for a ruck infringement. Naiqama decided to take the shot at goal and didn't miss, so the score was 20 - 10 in favour of Fiji with seventeen minutes left on the clock. Ireland continued to be under siege and 10 metres out from their line, Fiji's halfback Aaron Groom stabbed a kick in behind the defence for Jarryd Hayne to chase and put down after clipping one of the uprights in his haste in the 66th minute. The video referee awarded the try and Naiqama kicked the simple conversion so Fiji had a comfortable lead at 26 - 10. Ten minutes later Fiji scored again after continuing to attack Ireland's line, this time Uate crossing out wide on the right wing. Naiqama's kick from the sideline hit the upright and missed, so with just over 5 minutes of the game remaining, the score was 30 - 10. Ireland got one more chance to attack Fiji's line in the closing minutes and it was Blanch who scored for them again, benefiting from a good offload from Lee Doran close to the try-line. Richards missed the conversion attempt so the final score was Fiji 30, Ireland 14. The Bati would play Australia next, with the winner of that match going to the World Cup final, while the Irish exited the tournament with A$75,000 prize money.

10 November 2008
18:55 AEST (UTC+10:00)

Fiji	30–14	Ireland
Tries: Uate (2); Bukuya; Hayne; Naiqama; Goals: Wes Naiqama (5/6)	Report	Tries: Blanch (2); Grix; Goals: Richards (1/4)

Robina Stadium, Gold Coast
Attendance: 8,224
Referee: Ashley Klein (England)
Player of the Match: Aaron Groom (Fiji)

Fiji	Ireland

FB	1	Jarryd Hayne
LW	2	Semi Tadulala
RC	3	Wes Naiqama (c)
LC	4	Daryl Millard
RW	5	Akuila Uate
FE	6	Alipate Noilea
HB	7	Aaron Groom
PR	12	Osea Sadrau
HK	9	Waisale Sukanaveita
PR	10	Ilisoni Vonomateiratu
SR	11	Ashton Sims
SR	18	Sevanaia Koroi
LK	13	Jayson Bukuya
Substitutions:
IC	14	James Storer
IC	15	Nick Bradley-Qalilawa
IC	17	Semisi Tora
IC	23	Kaliova Nauqe
Coach:
(Fiji) Joe Dakuitoga

FB	1	Michael Platt
RW	2	Damien Blanch
RC	3	Sean Gleeson
LC	4	Stuart Littler
LW	5	Pat Richards
SO	6	Scott Grix (c)
SH	7	Liam Finn
PR	8	Eamon O'Carroll
HK	9	Bob Beswick
PR	10	Gareth Haggerty
SR	11	Ben Harrison
SR	12	Lee Doran
LF	13	Simon Finnigan
Substitutions:
IC	14	Michael McIlorum
IC	15	Karl Fitzpatrick
IC	16	Ged Corcoran
IC	17	Ryan Tandy
Coach:
(England) Andy Kelly

=== Semi-finals ===
==== Semi-final 1: New Zealand vs England ====
In a re-play of both sides' last match, New Zealand once again faced England, this time for the right to play in the World Cup final. English coach Tony Smith left it to within an hour of kick-off before naming his team for the match. Kevin Sinfield was dropped from his position on the bench. Ben Westwood was promoted from the bench to the run-on side. For New Zealand Jason Nightingale was replaced by Sam Perrett. Sika Manu's faster than expected recovery from an eye socket injury saw his return with David Kidwell dropped in his place.

No British side had won a test match in Brisbane since Wales had defeated England at Lang Park during the 1975 World Cup. New Zealand had lost their last 8 international matches in the city.

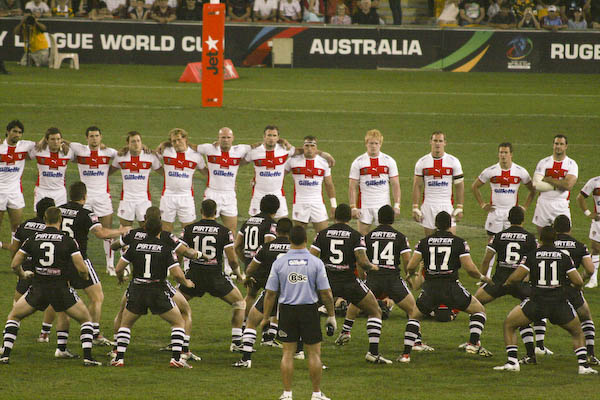
The Kiwis performing their Haka before the match.

This time when the Kiwis performed their haka, the England side stood in a line ten metres away and faced them.

In the ninth minute New Zealand were on the attack courtesy of a mistake from England and got the first try of the match, passing to Sam Perrett on the right wing who crossed out wide, then improved his kicker's position before putting the ball down. Jeremy Smith's conversion was successful so England trailed 6–nil. England, also benefitting from some New Zealand mistakes, were attacking the Kiwis' line and threw the ball out wide to the right wing as well and Ade Gardner dived over in the corner just before the fifteen-minute mark. The video referee showed that Gardner's toe touched the sideline before he grounded the ball so the try was not given. Four minutes later the Kiwis were back down at England's end when Lance Hohaia got over for a close-range try. Smith's kick went wide so the score was 10–nil in favour of New Zealand with a quarter of the match gone. Rob Purdham's restart kick went over the sideline on the full so New Zealand got the ball back and in the following set of six they scored again through Jerome Ropati. Smith's kick was good this time, so the Kiwis had 16 unanswered points. Then in the twenty-ninth minute England had an opportunity in attack down at New Zealand's end and kept the ball alive, the ball going to captain Jamie Peacock who forced his way over from close range. Purdham missed the conversion attempt so the score remained 16–4 in favour of the Kiwis. A New Zealand knock-on less than two minutes from half time saw the English get a scrum a few metres into the opposition's half. In a bold set move from the scrum base, England's loose forward Purdham broke away with the ball and immediately kicked it ahead for Danny Maguire racing through to regather and dive over by the goal posts. The video referee ruled that the chaser was only just in line with the kicker so the try was awarded. Rob Burrow was given the conversion attempt and kicked it, so England were back within a converted try at 16–10 at the half-time break.

After a few minutes of the second half, England second-rower Gareth Ellis was forced from the field with a rib injury. Both sides had attacking opportunities during the first 16 minutes of the half, but it was New Zealand's Bronson Harrison who scored first after receiving a good short ball from halfback Nathan Fien on England's twenty metre line which saw him cut through the defence, step past the fullback and score by the uprights. Smith's conversion meant the score was New Zealand 22, England 10 with twenty-two minutes of the match remaining. After a bomb from England which Hohaia failed to take securely, England were on the attack again. They moved the ball out through the hands to the right, and centre Martin Gleeseon dragged himself through the defence to reach out and score in the sixty-first minute. Burrow kicked the sideline conversion so England were back within a converted try of New Zealand at 22–16. The Kiwis then got repeat sets down near England's line and were the next to score: Fien kicked the ball over towards the goal posts and as it came down in-goal two English defenders failed to secure it and Jerome Ropati was there to fall onto it. Benji Marshall was given the conversion this time and kicked it successfully so the score was 28–16 with ten minutes to go. Three minutes later England gave themselves a glimmer of hope when Maguire found space between New Zealand's defence and ran through it from fifteen metres out to score by the posts. Burrow's conversion meant that England were back within six points with six minutes of the game left to go. However the English were let down by further handling errors and New Zealand were the last to score after England again failed to defend against a bomb out to the left, Marshall putting it down in the corner at the 78th minute, placing the game beyond doubt. Smith missed the sideline conversion so the final score was 32–22. England then went home with A$130,000 prize money and New Zealand had booked a place in the final the following week.

15 November 2008
18:55 AEST (UTC+10:00)

New Zealand	32–22	England
Tries: Ropati (2); Perrett; Hohaia; Harrison; Marshall; Goals: Smith (3); Marshall	Report	Tries: McGuire (2); Peacock; Gleeson; Goals: Burrow (3)

Lang Park, Brisbane
Attendance: 26,659
Referee: Shane Hayne (Australia)
Player of the Match: Benji Marshall (New Zealand)

New Zealand	England

FB	1	Lance Hohaia
RW	2	Sam Perrett
RC	3	Simon Mannering
LC	4	Jerome Ropati
LW	5	Manu Vatuvei
FE	6	Benji Marshall
HB	7	Nathan Fien
PR	8	Nathan Cayless (c)
HK	9	Thomas Leuluai
PR	10	Adam Blair
SR	17	Bronson Harrison
SR	12	David Fa'alogo
LK	13	Jeremy Smith
Substitutions:
IC	11	Sika Manu
IC	14	Isaac Luke
IC	15	Greg Eastwood
IC	16	Sam Rapira
Coach:
(New Zealand) Stephen Kearney

FB	1	Paul Wellens
RW	2	Ade Gardner
RC	3	Martin Gleeson
LC	4	Keith Senior
LW	5	Mark Calderwood
SO	6	Danny McGuire
SH	7	Rob Burrow
PR	8	James Graham
HK	9	James Roby
PR	10	Jamie Peacock (c)
SR	11	Ben Westwood
SR	12	Gareth Ellis
LF	13	Rob Purdham
Substitutions:
IC	14	Leon Pryce
IC	15	Adrian Morley
IC	16	Mickey Higham
IC	17	Jon Wilkin
Coach:
(Australia) Tony Smith

==== Semi-final 2: Australia vs Fiji ====
16 November 2008
19:55 ADST (UTC+11:00)

Australia	52–0	Fiji
Tries: Gallen 2'; Tate (2) 5', 16'; Slater (3) 9', 38', 49'; Thurston (3) 62', 66', 72'; Inglis 77'; Goals: Thurston (6/10)	Report

Sydney Football Stadium, Sydney
Attendance: 15,855
Referee: Ashley Klein (England)
Player of the Match: Billy Slater (Australia)

Australia	Fiji

FB	1	Billy Slater
RW	2	Joel Monaghan
RC	3	Greg Inglis
LC	4	Israel Folau
LW	5	Brent Tate
FE	6	Darren Lockyer (c)
HB	7	Johnathan Thurston
PR	8	Steve Price
HK	9	Cameron Smith
PR	10	Petero Civoniceva
SR	11	Anthony Laffranchi
SR	12	Glenn Stewart
LF	13	Paul Gallen
Substitutions:
IC	14	Karmichael Hunt
IC	15	Brent Kite
IC	16	Anthony Tupou
IC	17	Craig Fitzgibbon
Coach:
(Australia) Ricky Stuart

FB	1	Jarryd Hayne
LW	2	Semi Tadulala
RC	3	Wes Naiqama (c)
LC	4	Daryl Millard
RW	5	Akuila Uate
FE	6	Alipate Noilea
HB	7	Aaron Groom
PR	8	Osea Sadrau
HK	9	Waisale Sukanaveita
PR	10	Ilisoni Vonomateiratu
SR	11	Ashton Sims
SR	12	Sevanaia Koroi
LK	13	Jayson Bukuya
Substitutions:
IC	14	James Storer
IC	15	Nick Bradley-Qalilawa
IC	17	Semisi Tora
IC	19	Jone Wesele
Coach:
(Fiji) Joe Dakuitoga

=== Final: Australia vs New Zealand ===
22 November 2008
19:00 AEST (UTC+10:00)

Australia	20–34	New Zealand
Tries: Lockyer 11', 35'; Williams 15'; Inglis 64'; Goals: Thurston (2/4)	Report	Tries: Hohaia 53', 70' (pen.); Smith 24'; Ropati 28'; Marshall 60'; Blair 75'; Goals: Luke (3/3); Marshall (2/3)

Lang Park, Brisbane
Attendance: 50,599
Referee: Ashley Klein (England)
Player of the Match: Darren Lockyer
