= Fetuli =

Fetuli is a given name. Notable people with the given name include:

- Fetuli Paea (born 1994), Tongan rugby union player
- Fetuli Talanoa (born 1987), Tongan rugby league player
