= Central Coast Stadium =

Sports venue in New South Wales, Australia

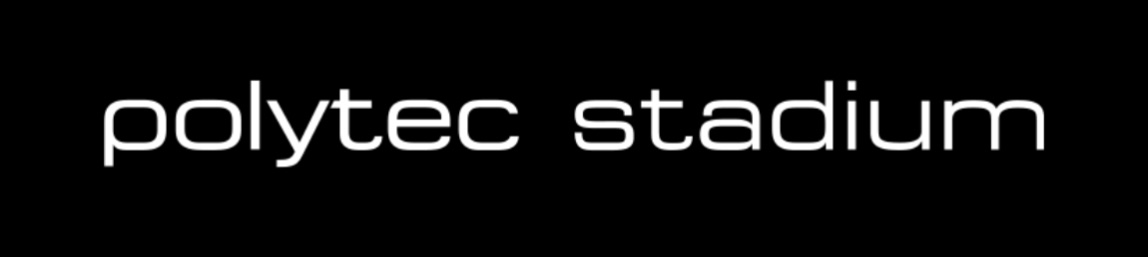

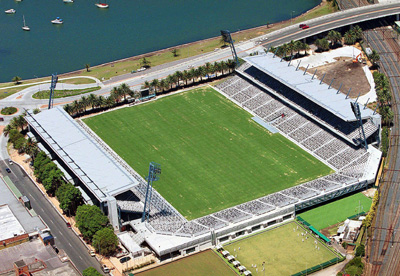
- Interactive map of Central Coast Stadium
- Address: 14 Dane Dr & Central Coast Highway; Gosford, New South Wales
- Coordinates: 33°25′42″S 151°20′17″E
- Owner: Central Coast Council
- Operator: VenuesLive
- Capacity: 20,059
- Surface: Grass
- Record attendance: 21,379 – Central Coast Mariners vs Melbourne Victory, 25 May 2024 A-League Men Grand Final
- Field size: 133 x 82 m
- Public transit: Gosford

Construction
- Built: 1999
- Opened: February 2000

Tenants
- Central Coast Mariners FC (A-League) (2005–present); Northern Eagles (NRL) (2000–2002); New Zealand Warriors (NRL) (2020–2021); Sydney Roosters (NRL) (one pre-season game per year, one home game per year, 2015-present); Sydney Roosters Women (NRLW) (two home game per year, 2025-present); South Sydney Rabbitohs (NRL) (one home game per year, 2025-present)

Website
- polytecstadium.com.au

Ground information

International information
- Only women's Test: 12 January 1985: Australia v England
- As of 7 September 2020; Source: CricketArchive

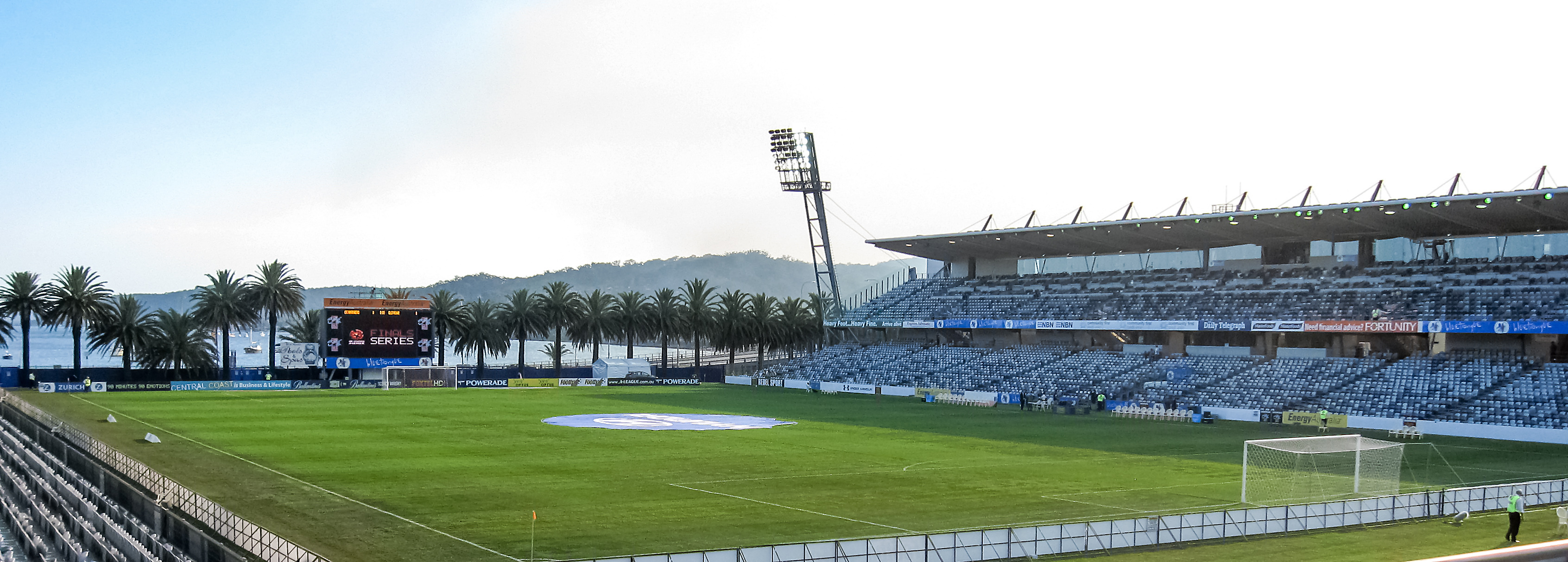
Central Coast Stadium in 2009

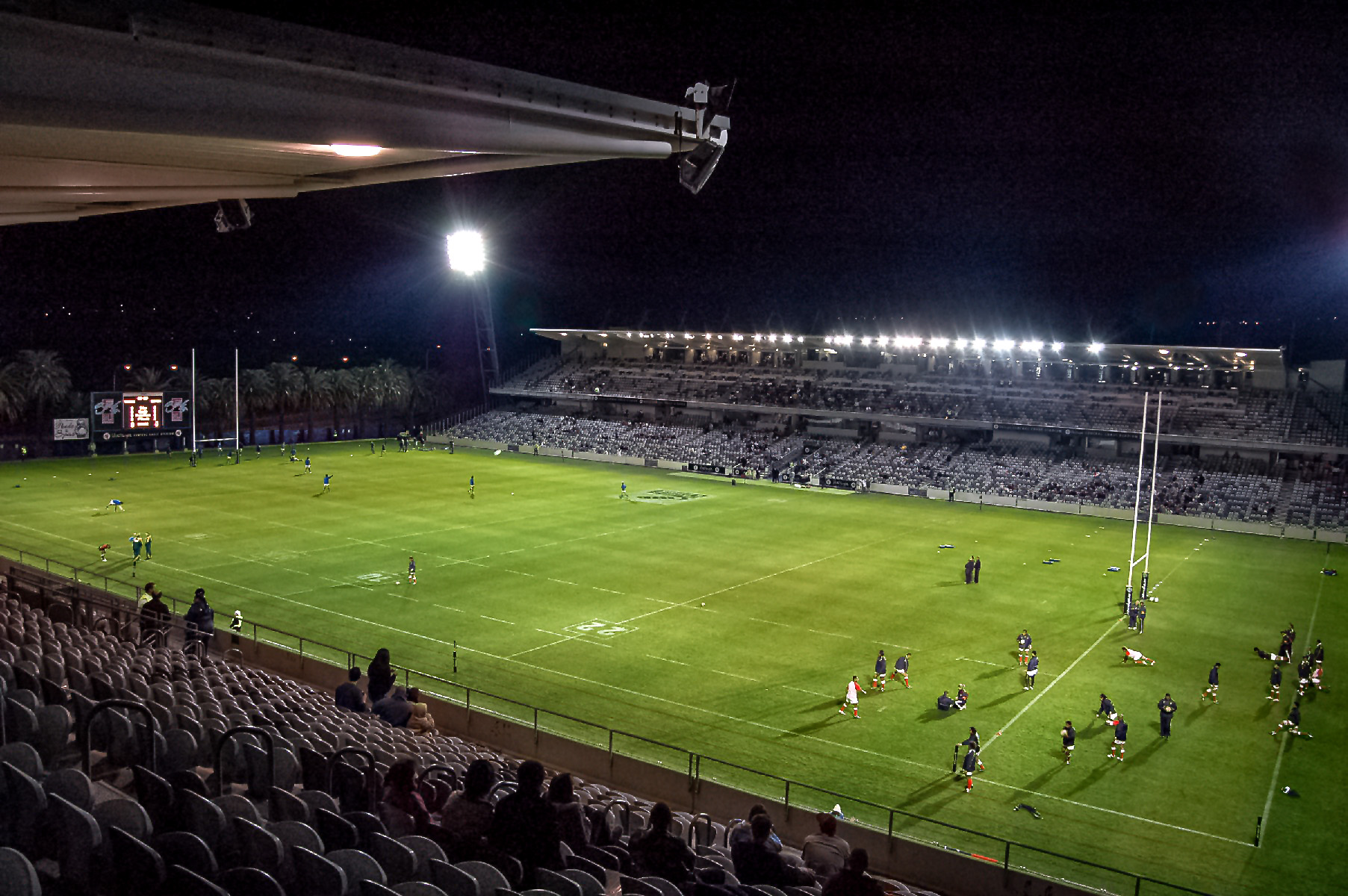
Bluetongue Central Coast Stadium at night

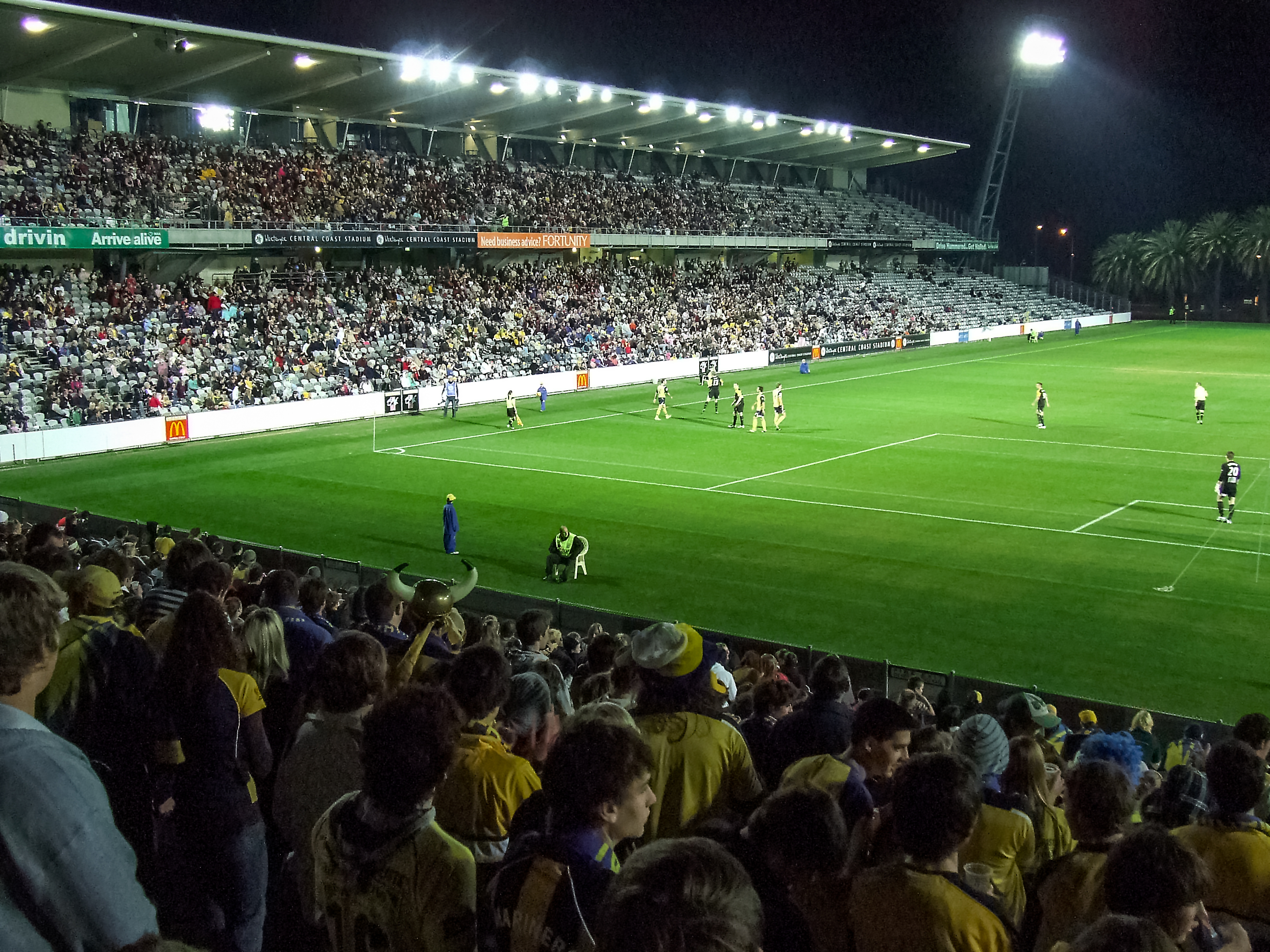
East stand of Bluetongue Stadium during a 2007 Preseason Cup match

Central Coast Stadium (known under naming rights as Polytec Stadium) is a sports venue in Gosford on the Central Coast of New South Wales. It is primarily used for football as the home ground of the Central Coast Mariners FC in the A-League Men.

From the establishment of the first venue at the site in 1915 it was known as Waterside Park, being renamed Grahame Park after significant expansion in 1939. Since then it has had several names incorporating that name. The stadium was originally designed in its current form to be the home stadium for the North Sydney Bears rugby league football club. Since 2025, interior design company Polytec has owned naming rights to the stadium.

== History ==
In 1911, Erina Shire Council proposed to create a park on the shore of Brisbane Water. The park required much land to be reclaimed from marshland. It also required privately owned land to be purchased by the council and a section of road to be demolished. Waterside Park was opened in 1915 and a cricket pitch was added during that year. Further reclamation of the foreshore extended the park during the Depression that gave work to the unemployed. By 1939 surplus railway land had been added and a bowling club and green, as well as tennis courts, had been constructed. In 1939 the park was renamed Grahame Park, after the then mayor of Gosford, William Calman Grahame.

A full stadium was then touted and later built in the late 1990s, planned to be ready in 1999 for NRL club the North Sydney Bears, before construction problems including large spells of inclement weather delayed completion. Three grandstands with a combined capacity of 20,000 were built by Abigroup. The stadium finally opened in early 2000 as NorthPower Stadium at Grahame Park, the Northern Eagles National Rugby League team (a merging of the aforementioned Bears and the Manly Warringah Sea Eagles) taking residence there until their dissolving after the 2002 season.

In 2003, with no major sporting team in residence, the stadium played host to three group matches in the 2003 Rugby World Cup. The Pacific Islanders rugby union team played one match at the stadium on their 2004 tour.

The stadium gained its second full-time tenant in 2005 with the formation of the Central Coast Mariners, a team in the newly formed national A-League football competition. It became the first full-time national sporting competition to have a team play at the stadium. Further use of the stadium in 2006 follows from it being the home ground to the Central Coast Waves rugby union team, which joined the Shute Shield in 2006.

The stadium continues to host NRL competition matches from time to time, as well as some pre-season trials. The Central Coast Rays, the Central Coasts' Australian Rugby Championship team, played out of the stadium during the only season of the competition in 2007. The stadium continued as a home to the Mariners A-League side as of 2007, and hosted NRL matches throughout the 2008 Centenary Year. In 2014, the NSW Country Eagles hosted a National Rugby Championship match at Central Coast.

In recent years the Sydney Roosters have hosted one NRL game per season at Central Coast Stadium; other clubs such as the South Sydney Rabbitohs, Wests Tigers, Manly-Warringah Sea Eagles and Canterbury-Bankstown Bulldogs have also taken games to the Central Coast. In 2004, Central Coast Stadium played host to two North Queensland Cowboys matches, the first of which resulted in a historic 20–20 draw with wooden spooners South Sydney, the first such result since golden point was introduced in 2003.

A photo taken at the stadium appeared in a Season 5 episode of the U.S. TV series The Office. A photo appears of two players, taken from an A-League game between Central Coast Mariners and Perth Glory, played at Bluetongue Stadium on 31 December 2008. The players in the photo (taken by Corey Davis of Getty Images) are Marc Anthony (Perth) and Matthew Osman (Central Coast).

In the 2020, and the first four months of the 2021 NRL seasons, the ground was used as a temporary home ground for the New Zealand Warriors, due to border restrictions between Australia and New Zealand which prevented the club from travelling freely between the two countries during the COVID-19 pandemic.

VenuesLive took over the management of the ground from the Central Coast Council on 1 July 2022, and Industree Group acquired naming right on 14 November 2022.

=== Name changes ===
There have been several name changes since the Stadium was built, primarily reactions relating to sponsorship:

- Waterside Park, from 1915
- Grahame Park, from 1939
- NorthPower Stadium at Grahame Park, from January 2000
- Central Coast Stadium at Grahame Park, from 23 September 2002
- Central Coast Express Advocate Stadium at Grahame Park, from 11 February 2003
- Central Coast Stadium at Grahame Park, from 21 March 2005
- Central Coast Bluetongue Stadium at Grahame Park, from 28 March 2006
- Central Coast Stadium at Grahame Park, from 25 January 2014
- Industree Group Stadium, from 14 November 2022
- Polytec Stadium, from 1 July 2025

== Description ==
The stadium is rectangular and unusual in that seating is located on only three sides of the ground. The southern end is open giving filtered views of Brisbane Water through a row of palm trees. With an all seater capacity of 20,059, it was as of 2012 the second smallest stadium in the A-League. It is within walking distance of the Gosford CBD and Gosford railway station. The Central Coast Leagues Club and League Club Field are adjacent to the stadium, across Dane Drive.

== Transport ==
Gosford railway station is nearby. The station is served by the Central Coast & Newcastle Line and a small number of long-distance services.

== Osprey nest ==
There is a nest of eastern ospreys, a vulnerable species of bird, nesting in one of the light towers. The breeding pair produced chicks every year from 2016 until July 2023, when a video of the osprey family was posted on Facebook. The parents were named Rosie and Hutch by patrons of the stadium.

== Attendance records ==
Record crowds for different sports:

Sport	Date	Match	Crowd
Association football	25 May 2024	Central Coast Mariners def. Melbourne Victory 2023–24 A-League Men, Grand Final	21,379
Rugby league	16 August 2013	South Sydney Rabbitohs def. Manly-Warringah Sea Eagles 22–10 2013 NRL season, Round 23	20,060
Rugby league	1 July 2017	Cronulla-Sutherland Sharks def. Sydney Roosters 44–12 2017 NRL season, Round 17	20,060
Rugby union	27 October 2003	Japan def. by United States 26–39 2003 Rugby World Cup Pool B match	19,653

== Rugby league test matches ==
The stadium has hosted one rugby league international.

Date	Result	Attendance	Notes
1 November 2008	Scotland def. Fiji 18–16	9,720	2008 Rugby League World Cup Group B

== Rugby World Cup ==
The stadium hosted three games of the 2003 Rugby World Cup which was held in Australia.

Date	Competition	Home team		Away team		Attendance
11 October 2003	2003 Rugby World Cup Pool A	Ireland	45	Romania	17	19,123
14 October 2003	2003 Rugby World Cup Pool A	Argentina	67	Namibia	14	17,887
27 October 2003	2003 Rugby World Cup Pool B	Japan	26	United States	39	19,653

== See also ==
- List of soccer stadiums in Australia
- Lists of stadiums
