= Lee Patterson (rugby league) =

Rugby league footballer

Personal information
- Full name: Lee Philip Paterson
- Born: 20 Jul 1982

Playing information
- Position: Wing, Centre
Club
Years	Team	Pld	T	G	FG	P
2004	Chorley Lynx	26	15	0	0	60
2005	Swinton Lions	30	20	0	0	80
2006–07	Rochdale Hornets	46	22	0	0	88
2008–13	Halifax RLFC	151	65	406	0	1072
2014	Batley Bulldogs	24	5	33	0	86
2015	Rochdale Hornets	22	5	0	0	20
	Total	299	132	439	0	1406
- Source: As of 14 April 2023

Lee Patterson is a former professional rugby league footballer who played in the 2000s. He played at club level for St. Helens, Chorley Lynx, Swinton Lions, York City Knights, and Rochdale Hornets, as a wing, or centre.

Somewhat confusingly, there was a professional rugby league player named Lee Paterson, who played during the same period.
