= Dean Colton =

Former Scotland international rugby league footballer

Personal information
- Full name: Dean Colton
- Born: 18 February 1983 (age 43) Doncaster, South Yorkshire, England

Playing information
- Position: Wing, Centre
Club
Years	Team	Pld	T	G	FG	P
2001–06	Doncaster	122	53	0	0	212
2007	Featherstone Rovers	19	6	0	0	24
2008–12	Doncaster	94	26	0	0	104
	Total	235	85	0	0	340
Representative
Years	Team	Pld	T	G	FG	P
2008	Scotland	1	1	0	0	4

Dean Colton (born 18 February 1983) is a former Scotland international rugby league footballer who played in the 2000s and 2010s. He played at club level for Toll Bar ARLFC (in Doncaster), Doncaster (two spells), and Featherstone Rovers, as a wing or centre.

== Background ==
Dean Colton was born in Doncaster, South Yorkshire, England.

== Playing career ==
Dean Colton made his début for Doncaster in 2001. He played 10 of his 11-year career at Doncaster, spending one season with Featherstone Rovers in 2007. Dean Colton made his début for Featherstone Rovers on Sunday 18 March 2007, and he played his last match for Featherstone Rovers during 2007. He announced his retirement in 2012.

He represented Scotland in the 2008 Rugby League World Cup, playing once and scoring a try in the 18–36 defeat by France.
