= Kaliova Nauqe Tani =

Fijian rugby league footballer (born 1985)

Kaliova Nauqe
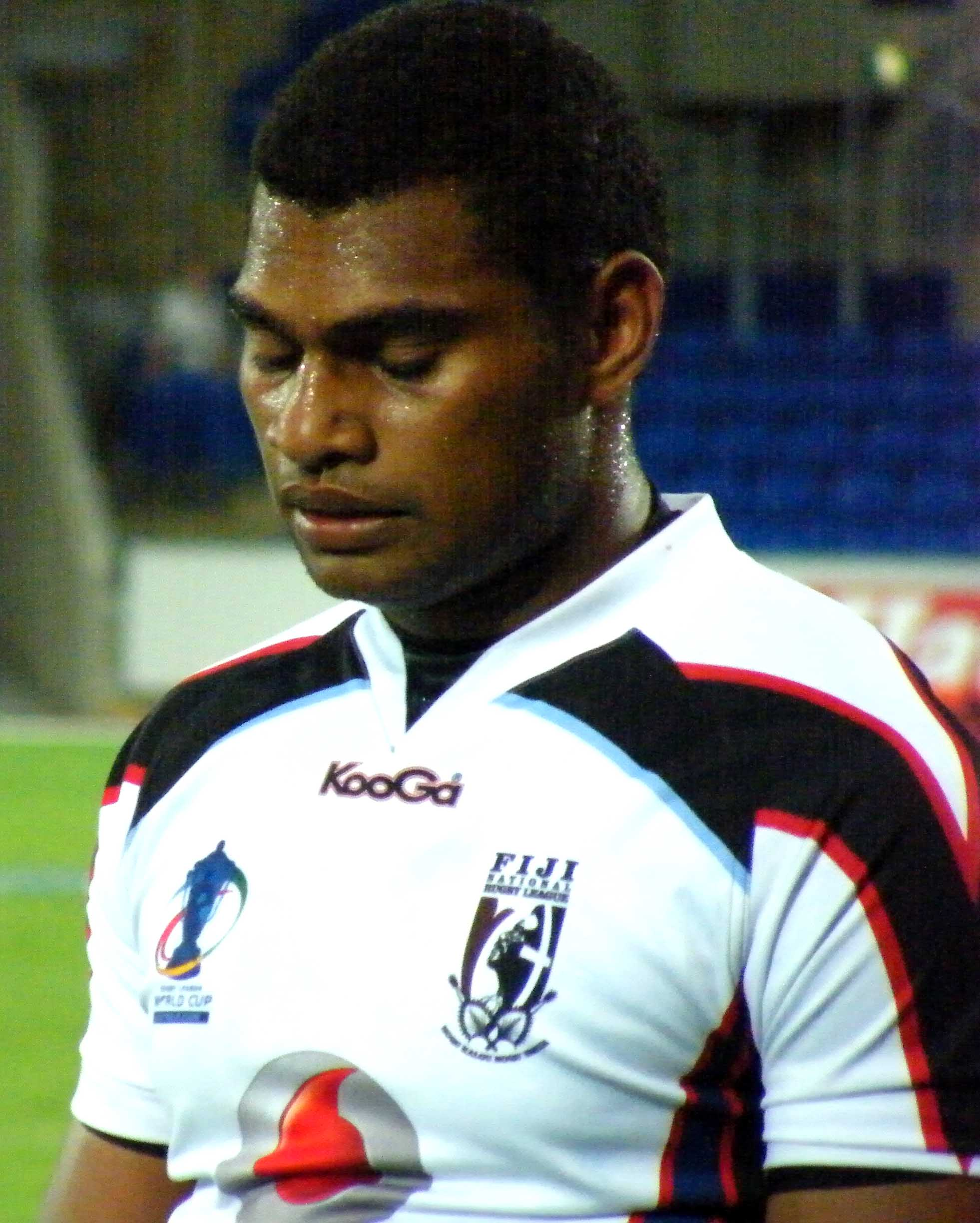
- Nauqe playing for Fiji in 2008

Personal information
- Full name: Kaliova Nauqe Tani
- Born: 7 May 1985 (age 40); Fiji
- Height: 167 cm (5 ft 6 in)
- Weight: 80 kg (12 st 8 lb)

Playing information
- Position: Five-eighth, Halfback
Representative
Years	Team	Pld	T	G	FG	P
2008–13	Fiji	3	0	0	0	0

Kaliova Nauqe Tani is a Fijian rugby league footballer who represented Fiji in the 2008 World Cup.

At the time he represented the Fassifern RLFC.

He was selected in the squad for the 2013 Rugby League World Cup.
