= Sevanaia Koroi =

Fiji international rugby league footballer

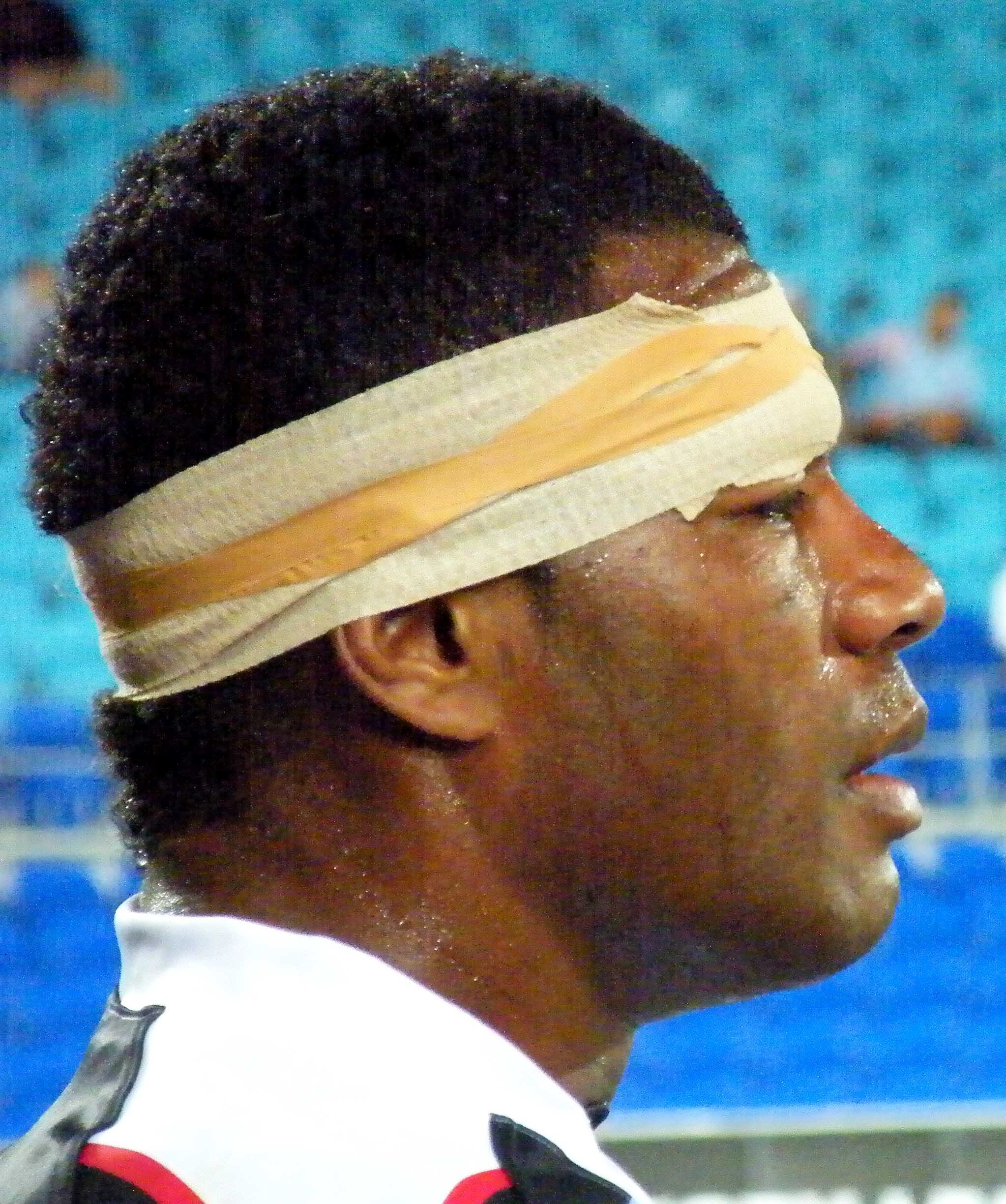
- Koroi playing for Fiji

Personal information
- Born: Fiji

Playing information
- Position: Centre, Second-row
Representative
Years	Team	Pld	T	G	FG	P
2006–09	Fiji	7	0	0	0	0

Sevanaia Koroi is a professional rugby league footballer. He represented Fiji at the 2008 Rugby League World Cup. Koroi signed with the British side Barrow Raiders for 2009, but the deal was cancelled due to the player being unable to obtain a visa.
