= James Storer =

Fiji international rugby league footballer

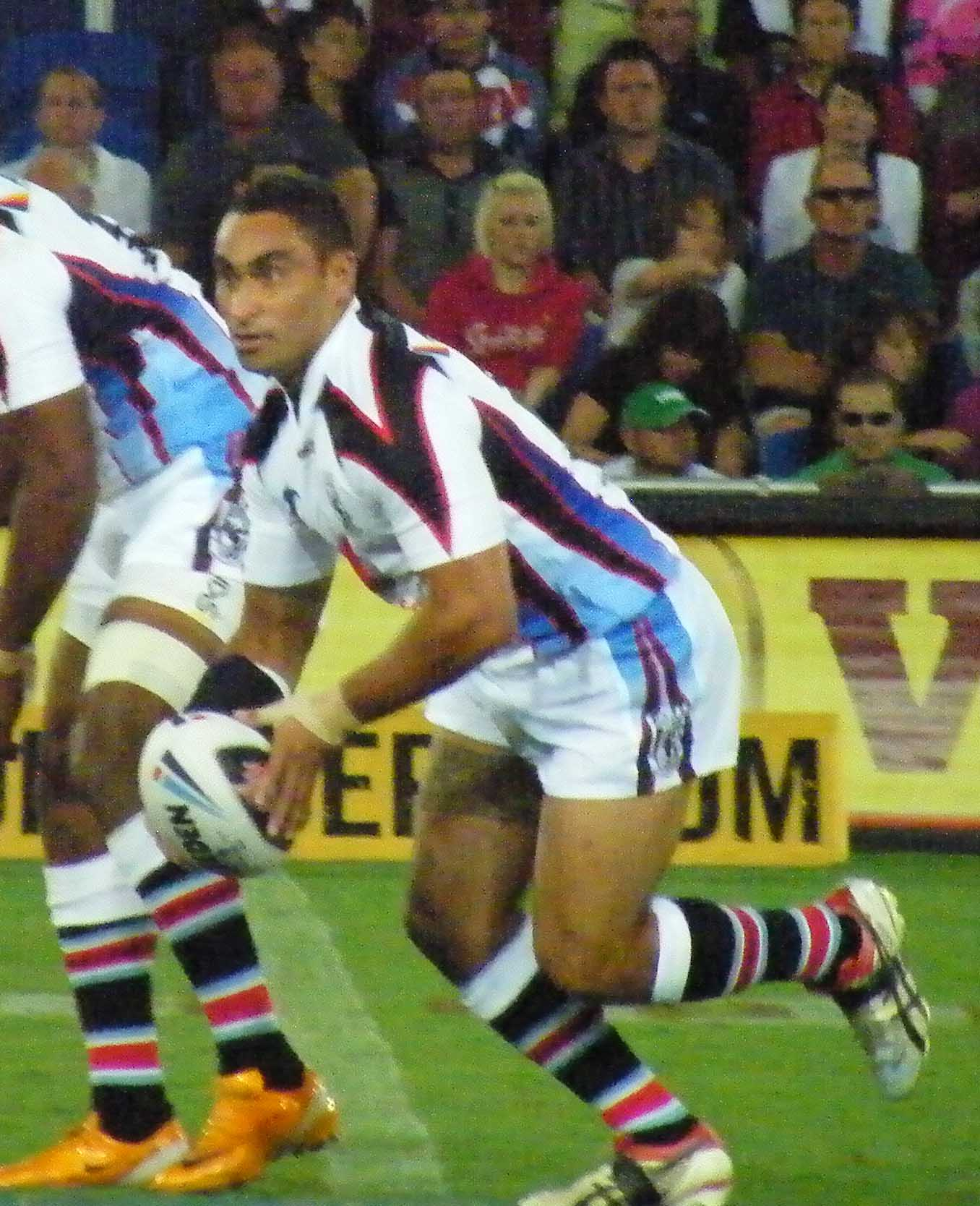
- Storer playing for Fiji at the 2008 World Cup

Personal information
- Born: 16 February 1982 (age 43); Sydney, New South Wales, Australia

Playing information
- Position: Hooker
Club
Years	Team	Pld	T	G	FG	P
2003	South Sydney	2	0	0	0	0
Representative
Years	Team	Pld	T	G	FG	P
2008–17	Fiji	12	2	0	0	8
- Source: As of 2 March 2018

James Storer (born 16 February 1982) is a Fiji international rugby league footballer who last played for the Port Kembla Blacks in the Group 7 Rugby League competition. He represented Fiji in three Rugby League World Cups.

== Background ==
He is of Indigenous & Fijian heritage.

== Playing career ==
Storer joined the St. George-Illawarra Dragons when aged 16. He left the club after the 2001 season.

In 2003 he played two National Rugby League games for the South Sydney Rabbitohs.

In 2006 he played for the Parramatta Eels in the NSWRL Premier League, scoring one try. Storer had also played for the Cronulla-Sutherland Sharks in the NSWRL Premier League.

He played for Fiji at the 2008 World Cup. After the tournament Storer suffered serious injuries to his left arm which forced him into early retirement. However, he made a comeback in 2013 and earned selection in Fiji's 2013 Rugby League World Cup squad.

In May 2014, Storer played for Fiji in the 2014 Pacific Test. He scored a try in Fiji's 32–16 defeat.

On 7 May 2016 Storer captained Fiji, for the first time, in the 2016 Melanesian Cup where he played at hooker in the 24–22 loss at Parramatta Stadium.

On 6 May 2017, Storer played in the Pacific Test against Tonga. Storer scored a try just moments after coming off the bench in the first half. Later that year, he was picked in the Fijian squad for the 2017 Rugby League World Cup.

Storer was the Captain/Coach of the Port Kembla Blacks before they withdrew from the South Coast Group 7 Competition at the end of 2017.

Storer runs a fitness boot camp called YUIN FITT just north of Wollongong.
