= Osea Sadrau =

Fiji international rugby league footballer (born 1986)

Personal information
- Born: 24 April 1986 (age 40) Fiji
- Height: 180 cm (5 ft 11 in)
- Weight: 108 kg (17 st 0 lb)

Playing information
- Position: Prop
Club
Years	Team	Pld	T	G	FG	P
	AS Carcassonne
Representative
Years	Team	Pld	T	G	FG	P
2008–15	Fiji	8	0	0	0	0
2019	Fiji Prime Minister's XIII	1	0	0	0	0
- Source: As of 10 November 2023

Osea Sadrau is a Fijian rugby league footballer who plays as a prop for the West Coast Storms in the Fiji National Rugby League Competition and also contracted to the Kaiviti Silktails. He previously played for AS Carcassonne in the Elite One Championship in France. He is a Fijian international.

Sadrau represented Fiji at both the 2008 and 2013 Rugby League World Cups.

In May 2014, Sadrau played for Fiji in the 2014 Pacific Rugby League International.

In May 2015, Sadrau played for Fiji in the 2015 Melanesian Cup.
