= Alipate Noilea =

Fiji dual-code rugby international footballer

Personal information
- Full name: Alipate Tani Noilea
- Born: 21 February 1983 (age 42); Namatakula, Fiji
- Height: 185 cm (6 ft 1 in)
- Weight: 98 kg (15 st 6 lb)

Playing information

Rugby league
- Position: Five-eighth
Representative
| Years | Team | Pld | T | G | FG | P |
|---|---|---|---|---|---|---|
| 2006–14 | Fiji | 11 | 0 | 1 | 0 | 2 |

Rugby union
- Position: Outside back
Representative
| Years | Team | Pld | T | G | FG | P |
|---|---|---|---|---|---|---|
| 2009 | Fiji | 1 | 1 | 0 | 0 | 5 |

Alipate Tani Noilea is a Fijian rugby league and rugby union footballer. He is a rugby league international and represented Fiji at the 2008 Rugby League World Cup.

He was one of Fiji's stand-out players in the 2008 tournament and earned widespread praise for his performances from the stand-off position. Noilea signed with the English club Barrow Raiders for the 2009 season but was not able to join the club due to issues with his visa application.

He switched codes to union, playing for the Fiji Warriors and was selected by the Fiji national side. He has since changed codes back to league and was selected for the 2009 Pacific Cup in which Fiji finished 3rd.

He was signed by Wests Tigers ahead of the 2011 NRL season.

He was named in the Fiji squad for the 2013 Rugby League World Cup.

In May 2014, Noilea played for Fiji in the 2014 Pacific Rugby League International. Later on in October, Noilea played in Fiji's clash with Lebanon in the inaugural Hayne/Mannah Cup.
