= Wade Liddell =

Scotland international rugby league footballer

Personal information
- Full name: Wade Liddell
- Born: 1 June 1979 (age 47) Brisbane, Queensland, Australia
- Height: 6 ft 0 in (1.83 m)
- Weight: 12 st 8 lb (80 kg)

Playing information
- Position: Fullback
Club
Years	Team	Pld	T	G	FG	P
	Gateshead Thunder
	Easts Tigers
	Total	0	0	0	0	0
Representative
Years	Team	Pld	T	G	FG	P
	Scotland	5	1	0	0	4

Wade "Wade-o" Liddell born 1 June 1979 is a former Scotland international rugby league footballer who played as a fullback for the Easts Tigers in the Queensland Cup. He has previously played for the Gateshead Thunder.

== Background ==
Wade Liddell was born in Brisbane, Queensland, Australia, he has Scottish ancestors, and eligible to play for Scotland due to the grandparent rule.

== Playing career ==
Liddell was named in the Scotland squad for the 2008 Rugby League World Cup.

He played in 163 games for the Easts Tigers in the Queensland Cup. He scored 65 tries and a total of 290 points.

He played for the Souths Logan Magpies in the 2011 Queensland Cup.
