= Chris Armit =

Former Scotland international rugby league footballer

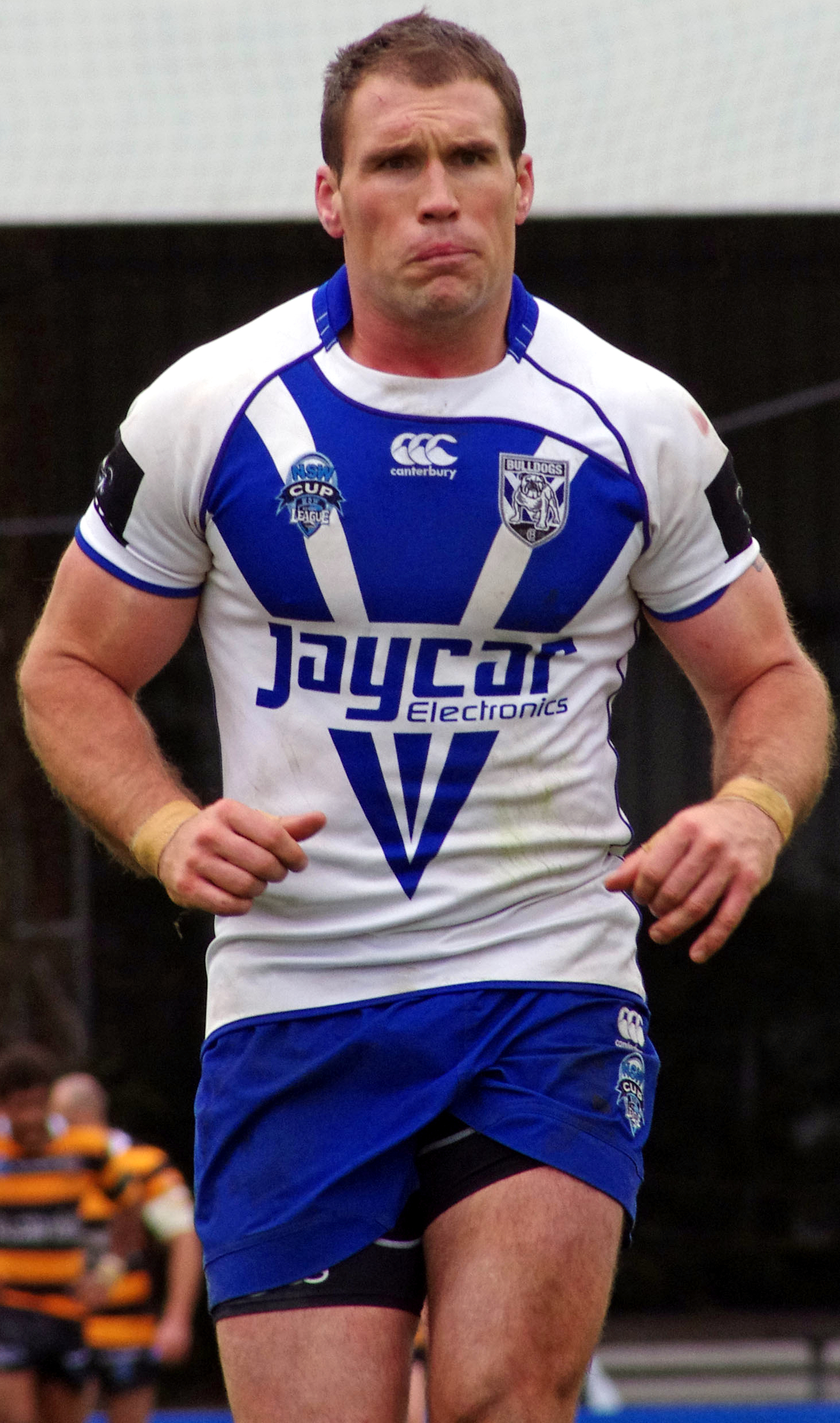

Personal information
- Full name: Christopher Armit
- Born: 7 October 1983 (age 43) Newcastle, New South Wales, Australia

Playing information
- Height: 1.86 m (6 ft 1 in)
- Weight: 106 kg (16 st 10 lb)
- Position: Prop
Club
Years	Team	Pld	T	G	FG	P
2003–04	Parramatta Eels	15	1	0	0	4
2005–11	Canterbury Bulldogs	134	4	0	0	16
2012	Penrith Panthers	11	0	0	0	0
	Total	160	5	0	0	20
Representative
Years	Team	Pld	T	G	FG	P
2008	Scotland	3	0	0	0	0

Chris Armit (born 7 October 1983) is a former Scotland international rugby league footballer who played as a prop in the NRL. He retired in 2012 and has played for the Parramatta Eels, Canterbury-Bankstown Bulldogs and Penrith Panthers. He has represented Scotland.

== Early life ==
Armit was born in Newcastle, New South Wales, Australia and grew up in the Sydney suburb of Baulkham Hills. His junior club was Merrylands Rams.

== Playing career ==
Armit started his career with the Parramatta Eels. At the end of the 2004 season, he was told by coach Brian Smith that he was unwanted for next season and subsequently left the club.

As 2004 NRL premiers, Canterbury-Bankstown faced Super League IX champions, Leeds in the 2005 World Club Challenge. Armit played at prop forward in the Bulldogs' 32–39 loss. In the 2006 NRL season, he played 24 games as Canterbury finished second on the table. The club were expected along with Melbourne to reach the 2006 NRL Grand Final but suffered a shock 37-20 loss against the Brisbane Broncos at the Sydney Football Stadium. Canterbury had led 20-6 at halftime but conceded 31 points in the second half.

In the 2007 NRL season, Canterbury again qualified for the finals. Armit played in the club's elimination final loss against his former club Parramatta at Telstra Stadium. In the 2008 NRL season, he played 18 games as Canterbury finished last on the table.

He was eligible for Scotland's 2008 Rugby League World Cup campaign. He was later named in the Scotland squad for the 2008 Rugby League World Cup.

The following year in 2009, Canterbury finished second on the table and were among the favorites to win the competition alongside St. George Illawarra. Armit played in Canterbury's preliminary final defeat against Parramatta at Telstra Stadium.

Armit signed a deal with the Penrith Panthers in August 2011. He played one season with Penrith in 2012 which saw the club finish second last above bottom placed Parramatta.

== Post-playing ==
Armit undertook an apprenticeship in turf management.

He is an Australian Apprenticeships Ambassador for the Australian Government and an Apprentice Mentor in the NRL's Trade UP With The NRL Program.
