= Fetuli Talanoa =

Former Tonga international rugby league footballer

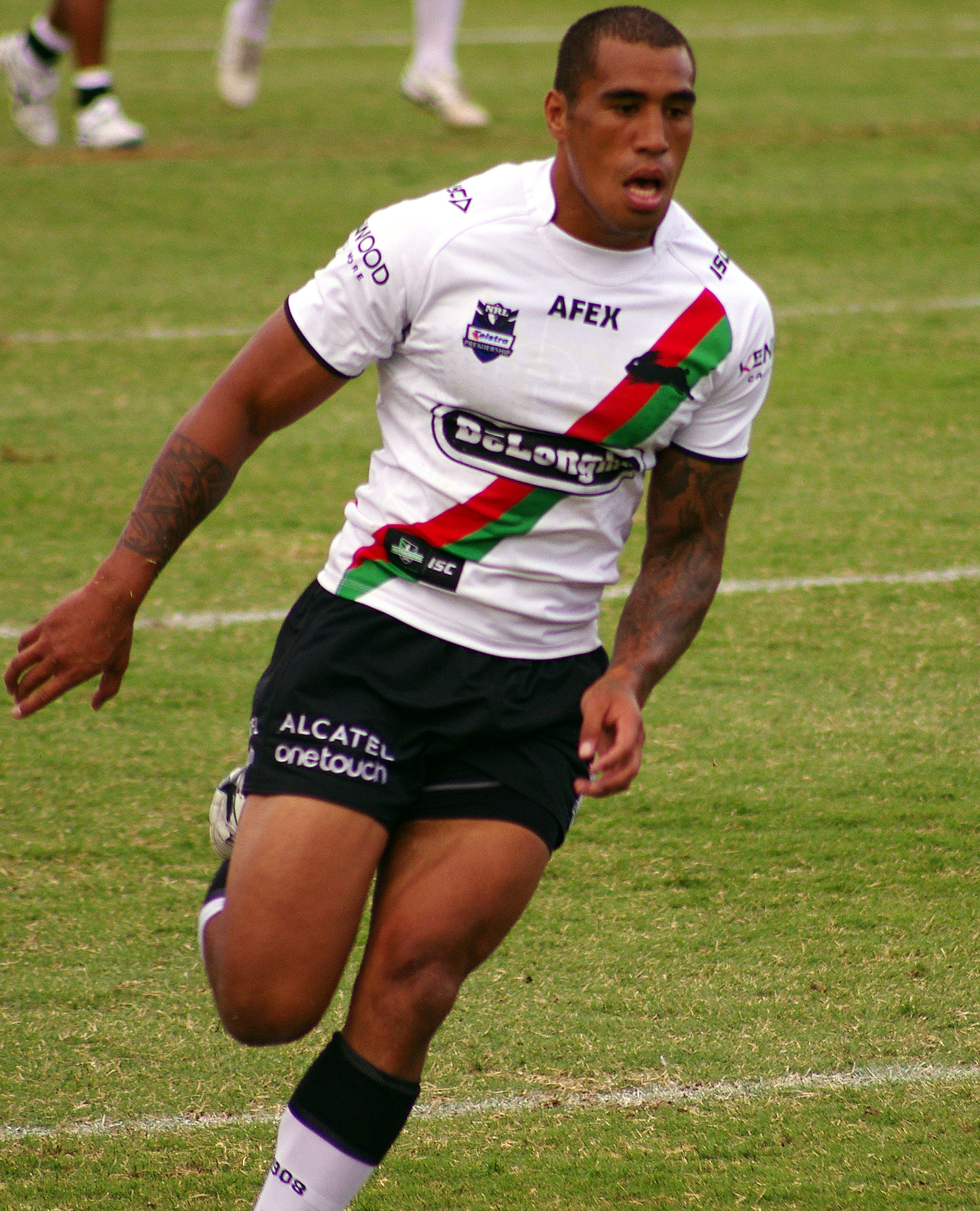

Personal information
- Born: 23 November 1987 (age 38) Auckland, New Zealand

Playing information
- Height: 183 cm (6 ft 0 in)
- Weight: 99 kg (15 st 8 lb)
- Position: Wing, Centre
Club
Years	Team	Pld	T	G	FG	P
2006–13	South Sydney	95	40	0	0	160
2014–19	Hull F.C.	128	59	0	0	236
	Total	223	99	0	0	396
Representative
Years	Team	Pld	T	G	FG	P
2008	Tonga	3	1	0	0	4

Fetuli Talanoa (born 23 November 1987) is a former Tonga international rugby league footballer who played as a wing or centre. He played for the South Sydney Rabbitohs in the National Rugby League (NRL) and for Hull F.C. in the Super League. He announced his retirement in April 2019.

== Background ==
Talanoa was born in Auckland, New Zealand. He is of Tongan ancestry.

== Playing career ==
Talanoa began his playing career for the South Sydney Rabbitohs in the NRL and also played for Souths feeder side The North Sydney Bears in The NSW Cup.

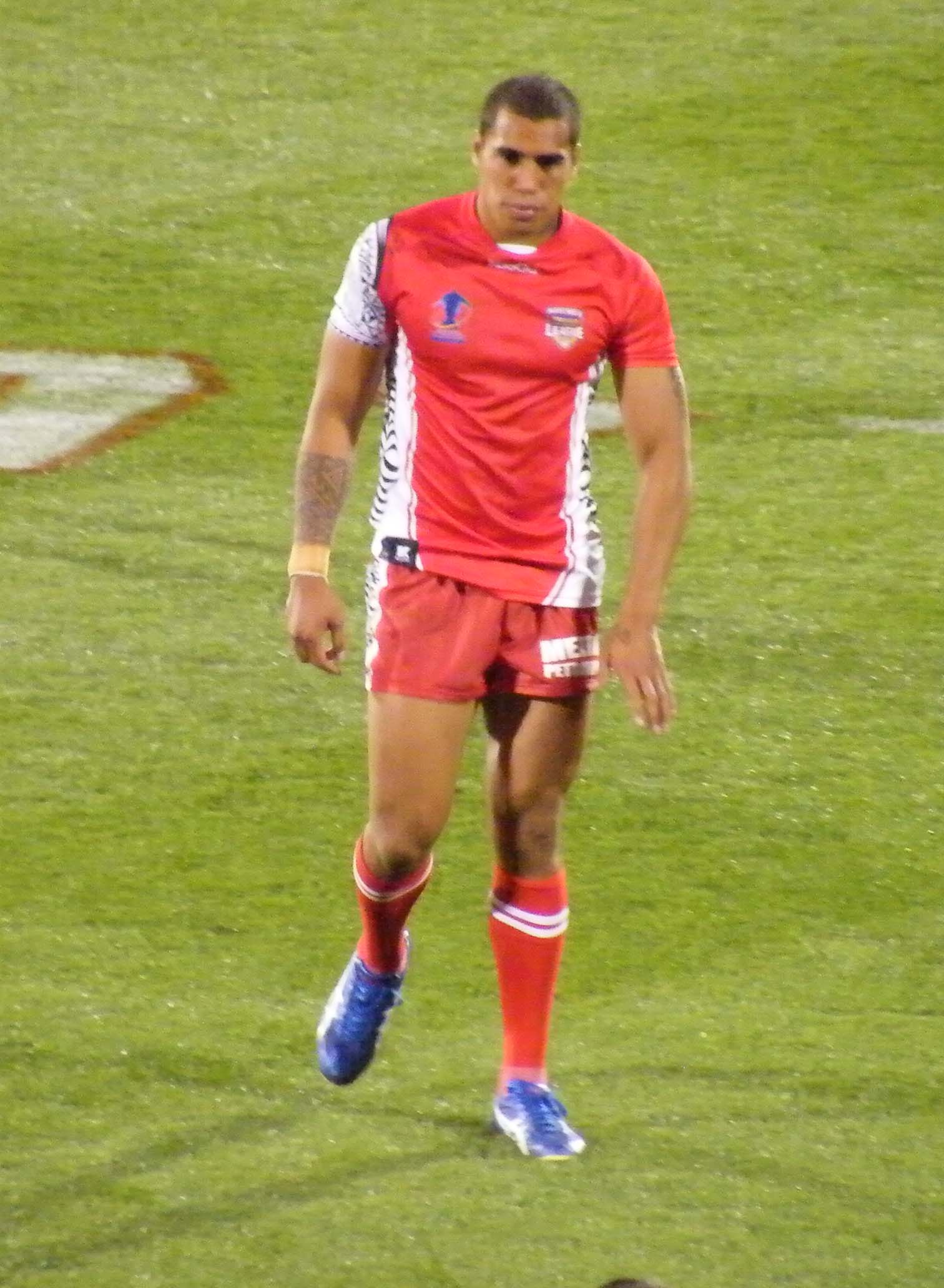
Fetuli Talanoa playing for Tonga

With Norths, Talanoa played 38 games and scored 14 tries.

In 2014, Talanoa signed for Super League club Hull FC. In 2016, he would play in Hull's 12-10 win over the Warrington Wolves in the 2016 Challenge Cup final. This was the first time that Hull had won the cup at Wembley Stadium after 8 previous attempts.

In 2017, Hull won the Challenge Cup again with Talanoa scoring a try in the 18-14 win over the Wigan Warriors at Wembley Stadium.

Talanoa announced his immediate retirement from playing on 9 April 2019 after discovering that a pre-season wrist injury which prevented him from making any appearances for Hull F.C. during the first half of the 2019 Super League season would require further surgery.

== International ==
Fetuli has appeared on several occasions for the Tonga with his first international appearances coming during the 2006 Federation Shield competition.

In August 2008, Talanoa was named in the Tonga training squad for the 2008 Rugby League World Cup, and in October 2008 he was named in the final 24-man Tonga squad.

He was named in the New Zealand training squad for the 2008 Rugby League World Cup.

== Honours ==
- Challenge Cup: (2) 2016, 2017
