= Ilisoni Vonomateiratu =

Fiji international rugby league footballer

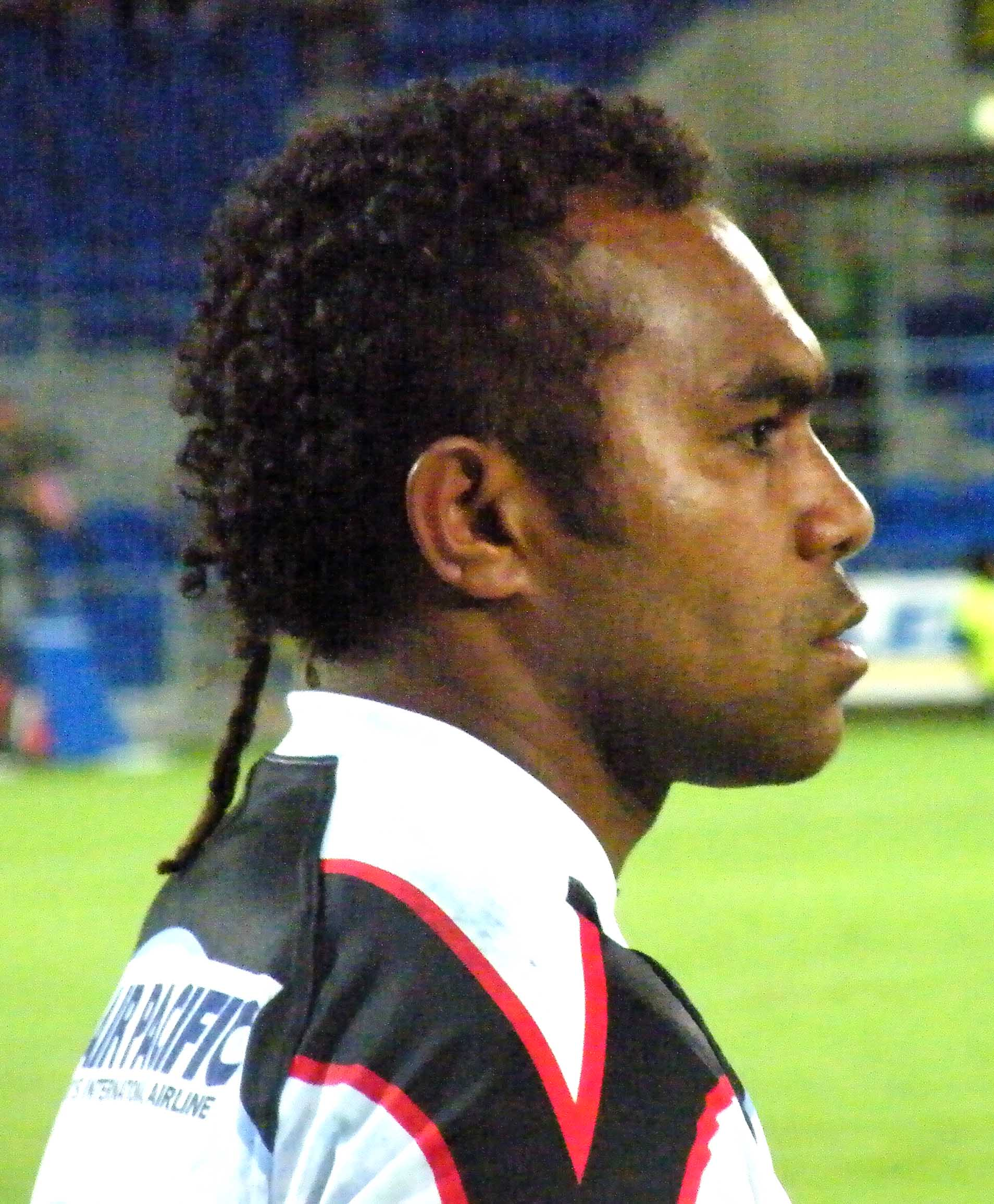

Personal information
- Born: 5 December 1981 (age 43); Fiji

Playing information
- Position: Prop
Club
Years	Team	Pld	T	G	FG	P
	Parkes Spacemen
	Dubbo CYMS (Fishies)
	Total	0	0	0	0	0
Representative
Years	Team	Pld	T	G	FG	P
2006–08	Fiji	6	0	0	0	0

Ilisoni Vonomateiratu is a professional rugby league footballer. He is a Fijian international.
