= Sébastien Planas =

France international rugby league footballer (born 1984)

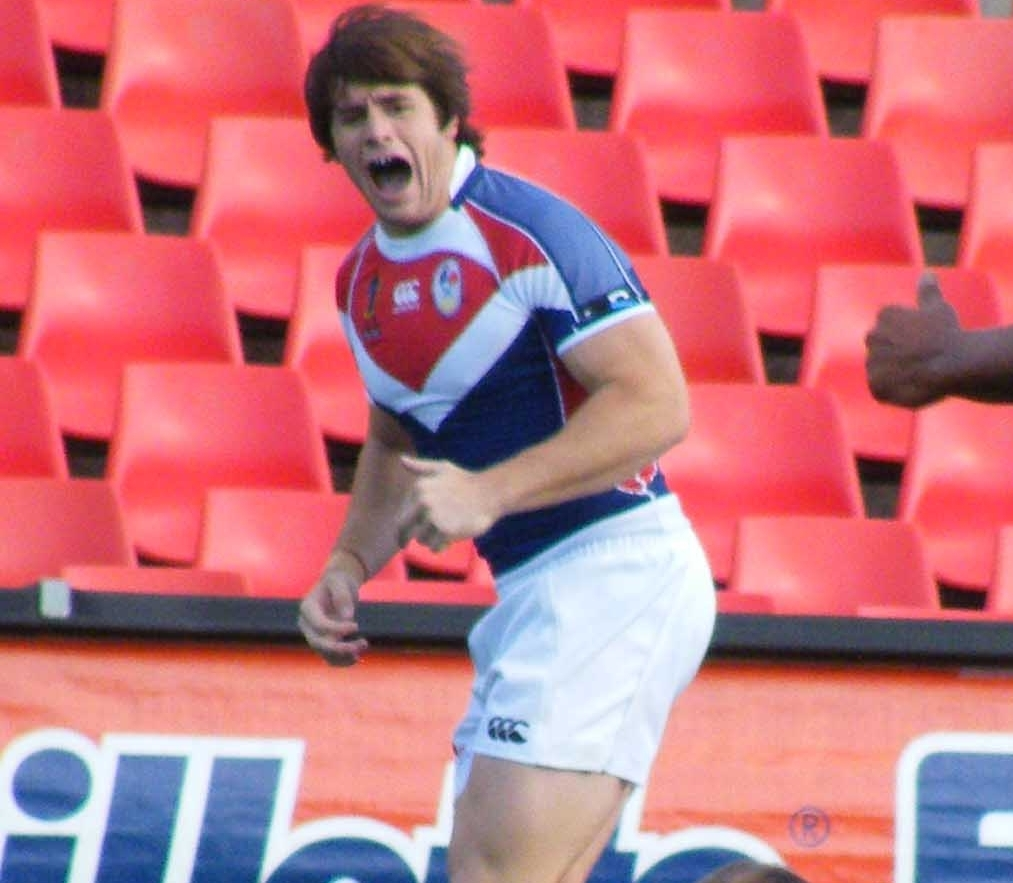

Personal information
- Born: 5 May 1984 (age 42) Perpignan, Languedoc-Roussillon, France
- Height: 1.82 m (6 ft 0 in)
- Weight: 90 kg (14 st 2 lb)

Playing information
- Position: Second-row, Centre
Club
Years	Team	Pld	T	G	FG	P
2004	Limoux Grizzlies	1	0	0	0	0
2007–18	Toulouse Olympique	179	43	0	0	172
	Total	180	43	0	0	172
Representative
Years	Team	Pld	T	G	FG	P
2007–09	France	8	2	0	0	8
- Source: As of 29 April 2018

Sébastien Planas (born 5 May 1984) is a French rugby league footballer who plays for Toulouse Olympique in the Championship. He has captained the club. He plays as a second-row or centre.

== Career ==
Planas joined Toulouse in 2007 and has spent his entire professional career with the club. He was named in the France squad for the 2008 Rugby League World Cup.
