= Jared Taylor (rugby league) =

Former France international rugby league footballer

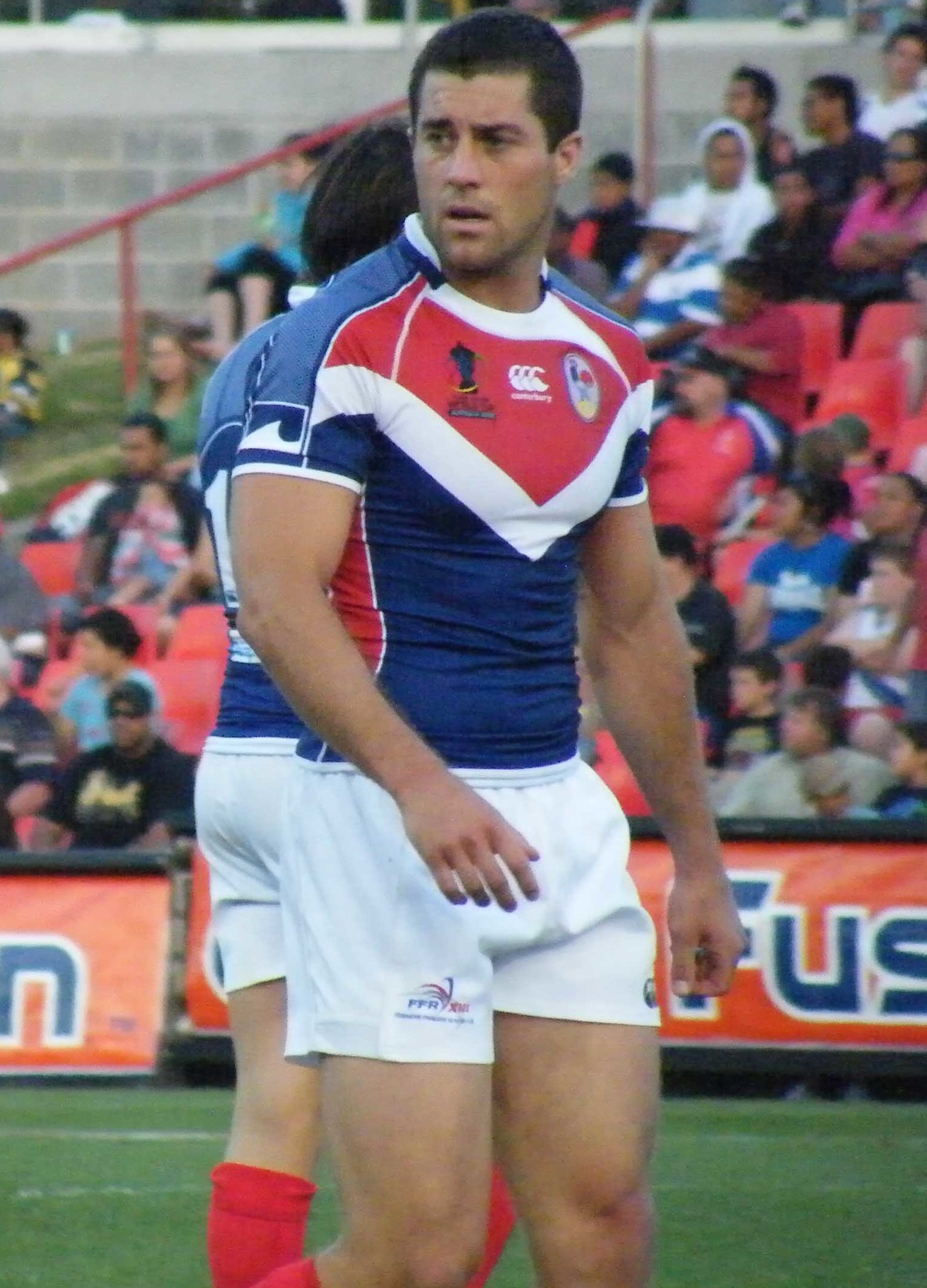

Personal information
- Full name: Jared Taylor
- Born: 21 May 1981 (age 45) Australia

Playing information
- Position: Fullback, Wing
Club
Years	Team	Pld	T	G	FG	P
2002	Cronulla Sharks	2	0	0	0	0
2003	South Sydney	1	0	0	0	0
2005–06	Villefranche-Aveyron	2	1	1	1	7
2006–09	Lézignan Sangliers	42	48	2	0	194
2009–10	Pia Donkeys	20	9	0	0	36
2012–14	Limoux Grizzlies	14	1	0	0	4
	Total	81	59	3	1	241
Representative
Years	Team	Pld	T	G	FG	P
2008	France	3	1	0	0	4
- Source: As of 3 March 2018

Jared Taylor is a former France international rugby league footballer who played for the Pia Donkeys in the Elite One Championship. Lézignan Sangliers in the Elite One Championship. He played as a fullback or on the wing.

== Background ==
Taylor was born in Australia.

== Career ==
In 2008 he was named in the France squad for the 2008 Rugby League World Cup.
