= Semisi Tora =

Fiji international rugby league footballer (born 1979)

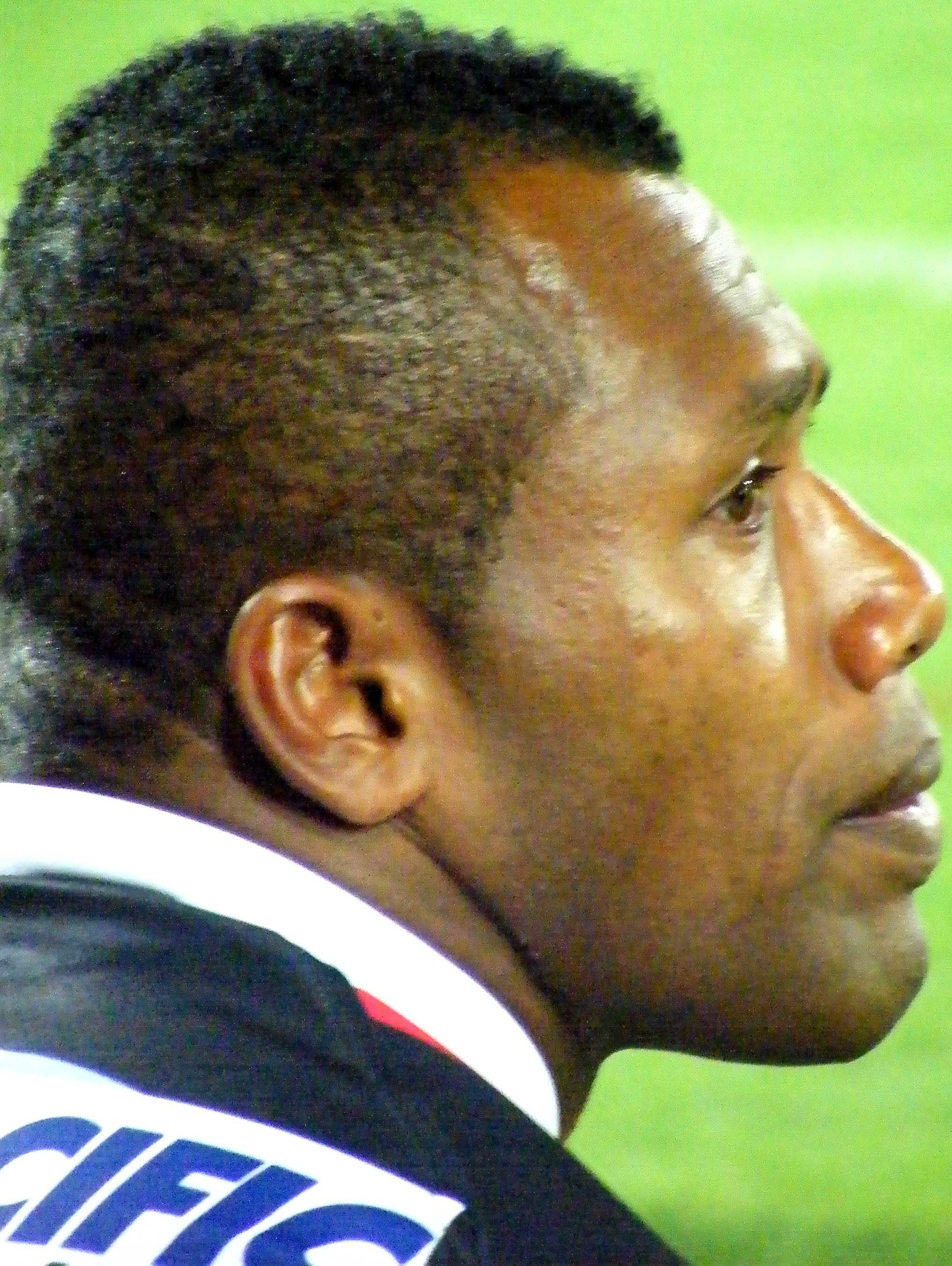

Personal information
- Born: 28 January 1979 (age 47)

Playing information
- Position: Second-row, Prop
Representative
Years	Team	Pld	T	G	FG	P
2006–11	Fiji	11	4	0	0	16
- Father: Kaiava Salusalu

Semisi Tora (born 28 January 1979) is a Fijian rugby league footballer who represented his country at the 2008 Rugby League World Cup. He plays as a prop or second-row forward. He is the son of dual-code rugby international Kaiava Salusalu.

As of 2012, he was playing for the Nyngan Tigers. Tora also competed for Fiji at the 2006 Pacific Cup.
