= Christophe Moly =

French rugby league footballer

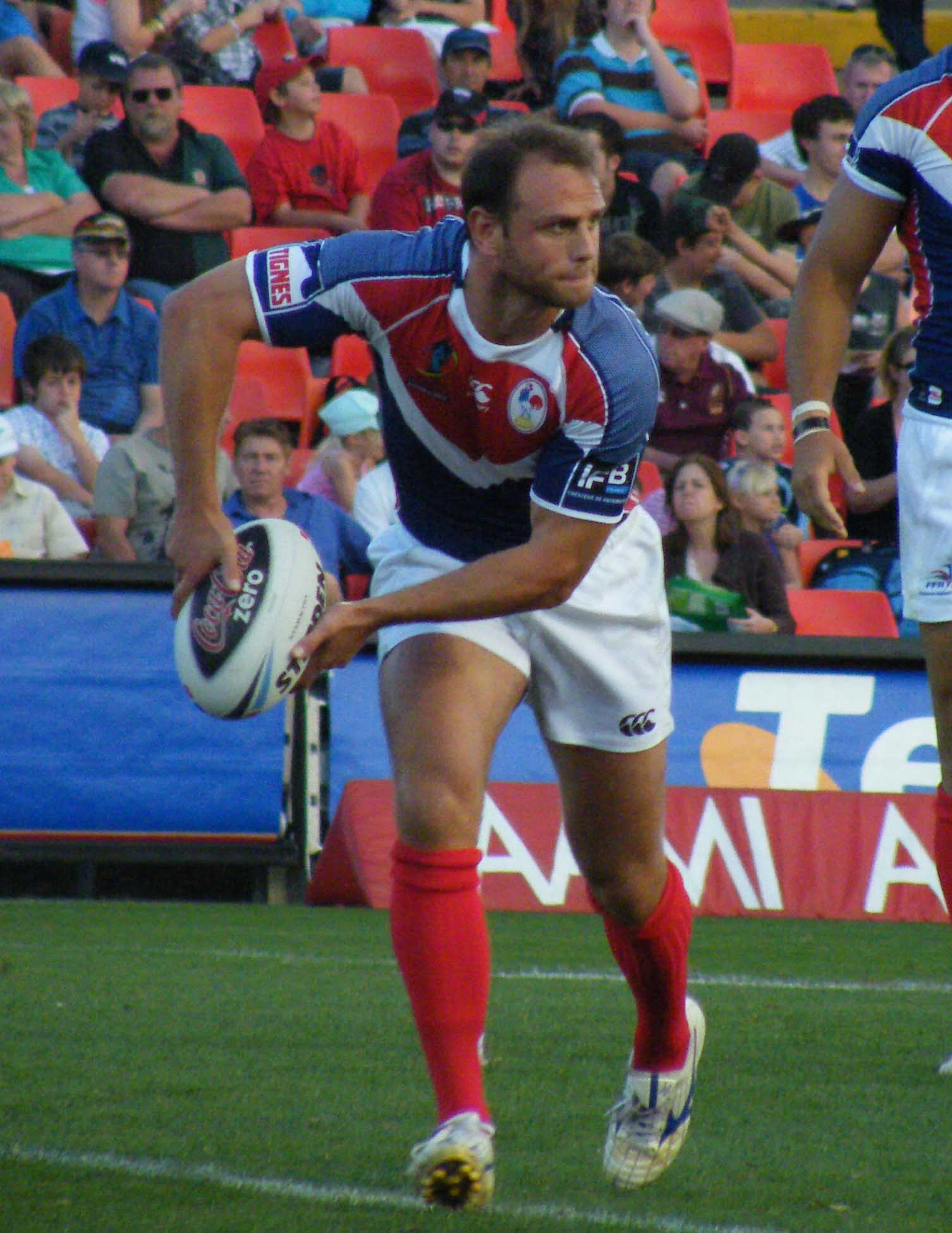

Personal information
- Born: 16 July 1982 (age 44) France

Playing information
- Position: Loose forward, Hooker, Second-row, Five-eighth, Halfback, Centre
Club
Years	Team	Pld	T	G	FG	P
	Baroudeurs de Pia XIII
	AS Carcassonne
	Total	0	0	0	0	0
Representative
Years	Team	Pld	T	G	FG	P
2005–08	France	10	3	0	0	12
- Source: As of 30 January 2021

Christophe Moly (born 16 July 1982) is a French former professional rugby league footballer who played in the 2000s. He played for the Pia Donkeys and Carcassonne club in the French Rugby League Championship competition.

He was named in the France training squad for the 2008 Rugby League World Cup.

He was named in the France squad for the 2008 Rugby League World Cup.

Moly continued to represent France in the 2009 Four Nations tournament.
