= Aaron Groom =

Fiji international rugby league footballer

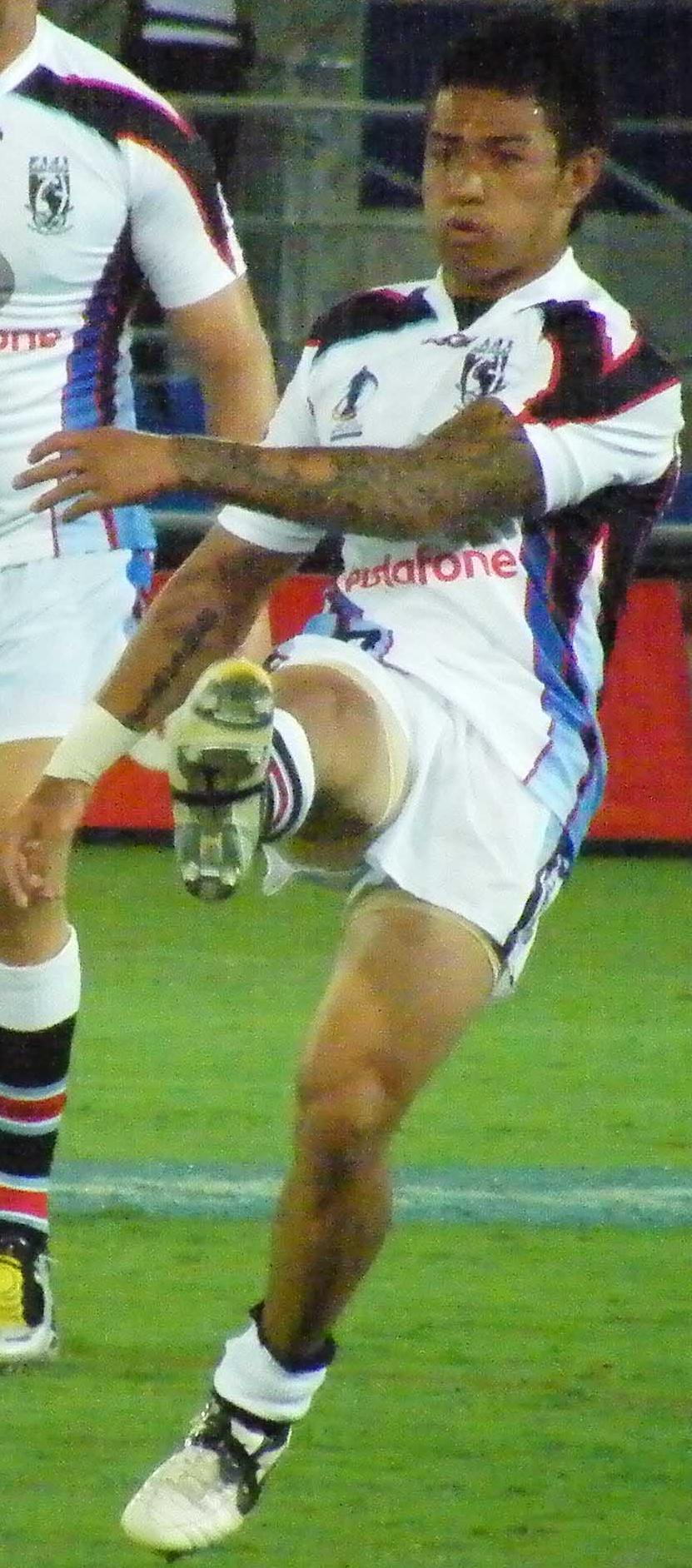
- Groom playing for Fiji in the 2008 Rugby League World Cup

Personal information
- Born: 23 June 1987 (age 39) Suva, Fiji
- Height: 176 cm (5 ft 9 in)
- Weight: 83 kg (13 st 1 lb)

Playing information
- Position: Halfback, Hooker
Club
Years	Team	Pld	T	G	FG	P
2008	Canterbury-Bankstown	6	0	0	0	0
2009–10	Sheffield Eagles	14	5	0	0	20
	Total	20	5	0	0	20
Representative
Years	Team	Pld	T	G	FG	P
2008–14	Fiji	10	1	0	0	4
- Source: Loverugbyleague As of 30 October 2023

Aaron Groom (born 23 June 1987) is a Fijian former professional rugby league footballer who last played for the Asquith Magpies in the Ron Massey Cup. Groom previously played for the Canterbury-Bankstown Bulldogs in the National Rugby League and Sheffield Eagles in the 2009 Challenge Cup. He primarily played as a halfback, but can also fill in at hooker.

== Background ==
Groom was born in Suva, Fiji.

== Career ==
Groom previously played for Canterbury-Bankstown in 2008, and made his début against the Gold Coast Titans in round 10 of the 2008 season. Groom was previously with the Manly-Warringah Sea Eagles in the NRL.

Groom played in the 2008 Rugby League World Cup for Fiji, picking up two man of the match awards.

Groom signed with the Sheffield Eagles for the 2009–2010 seasons but suffered a serious knee injury that limited his appearances in England.

Groom then went on to play for the Asquith Magpies in the North Sydney-Manly local A Grade competition and joined the North Sydney Bears for the 2013 season, making his first appearance for them in Round 4 against Illawarra.

Groom was named in the Fiji squad for the 2013 Rugby League World Cup. Groom scored the opening try and was named man of the match in Fiji's quarter-final victory over Samoa. Groom played 6 games for Norths in The 2013 NSW Cup

In May 2014, Groom played for Fiji in the 2014 Pacific Test against Samoa.

In 2014, Groom returned to the Asquith Magpies in the Ron Massey Cup and went on to captain the side.
