= Iowane Divavesi =

Fiji international rugby league footballer

Personal information
- Born: 13 July 1980 (age 45); Fiji
- Height: 180 cm (5 ft 11 in)
- Weight: 101 kg (15 st 13 lb)

Playing information
- Position: Prop
Representative
Years	Team	Pld	T	G	FG	P
2006–2009	Fiji	7	2	0	0	8

Iowane Divavesi is a professional rugby league footballer who plays for the Terrigal Sharks He also plays for Fiji.

He was a member of the Fiji squad for the 2008 Rugby League World Cup. However, he missed the final two games of the tournament due to suspension.
