= Waisale Sukanaveita =

Fiji dual-code rugby international footballer

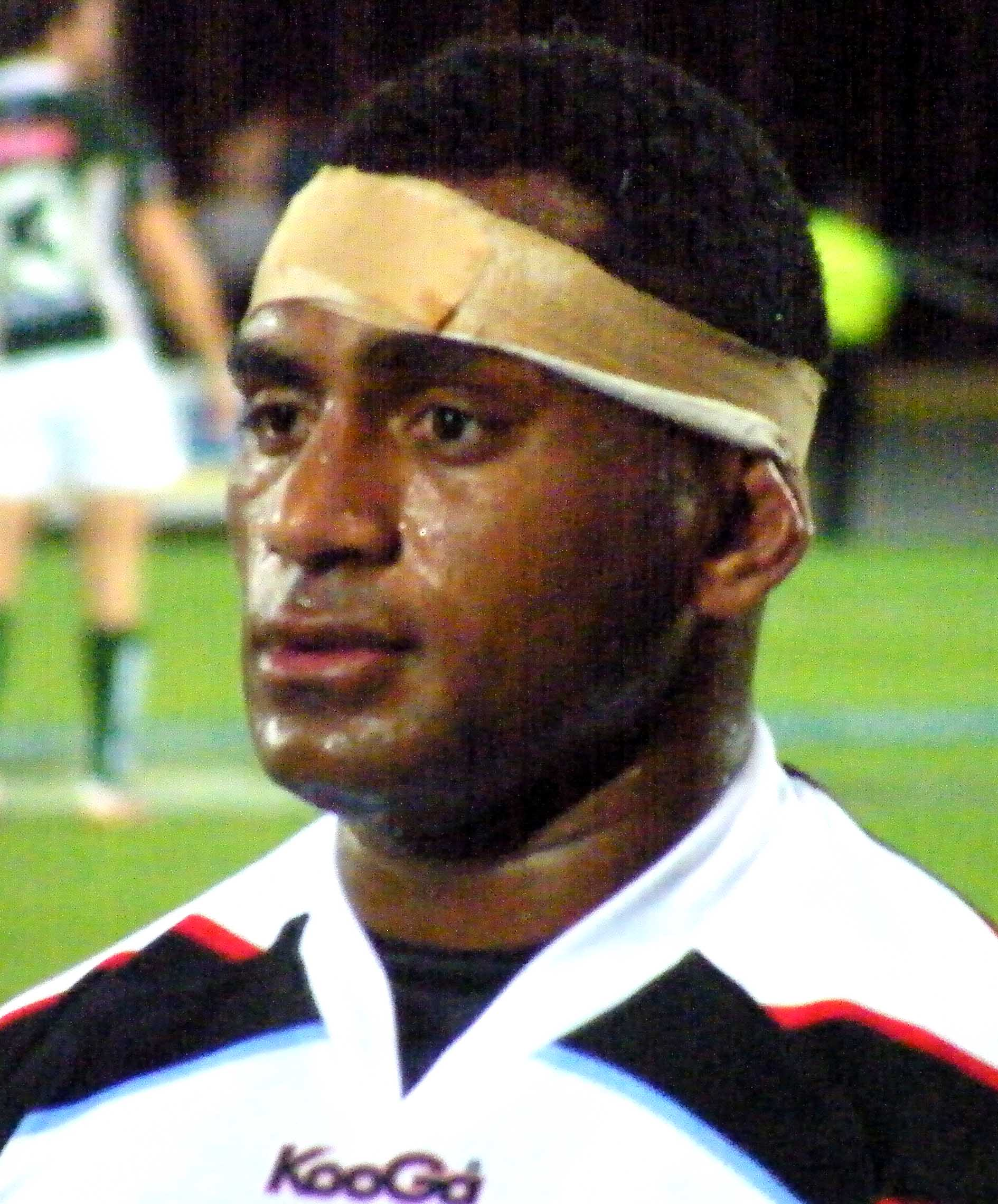

Personal information
- Born: 19 July 1984 (age 42) Suva, Fiji
- Height: 1.86 m (6 ft 1 in)
- Weight: 97 kg (15 st 4 lb)

Playing information
- Position: Hooker
Club
Years	Team	Pld	T	G	FG	P
	Barrow Raiders
Representative
Years	Team	Pld	T	G	FG	P
2006–08	Fiji	8				8

Rugby union career
- Position(s): Halfback, Centre
- Current team: Lyon
Senior career
Years	Team	Apps	(Points)
2013-16	Lyon		
2016-19	Montauban		
International career
Years	Team	Apps	(Points)
- Fiji
National sevens team
Years	Team		Comps
- Fiji

Waisale Sukanaveita (born 19 July 1984) is a rugby league and union footballer who plays for the Terrigal Sharks. He is a Fijian international. In rugby league he plays as a hooker and in rugby union he is a utility back (halfback/center). In his earlier rugby league career he played for the Nadera Panthers. Then later representing the Fiji Bati side in the World Cup 2008

Sukanaveita plied his trade in rugby union with French club Montauban. He was named in the Fiji 7s team for the Rugby World Cup 7s (rugby union) tournament being held in Dubai.
