= 2008 Rugby League World Cup =

13th Rugby League World Cup tournament

- Number of teams: 10
- Host country: Australia
- Winner: New Zealand (1st title)
- Matches played: 18
- Attendance: 293,442 (16,302 per match)
- Points scored: 890 (49.44 per match)
- Tries scored: 156 (8.67 per match)
- Top scorer: (Australia) Johnathan Thurston
- Top try scorer: (Australia) Billy Slater (7 tries)

The 2008 Rugby League World Cup was the thirteenth World Cup for men's rugby league national teams. It was held between 26 October and 22 November and was won by New Zealand, who defeated Australia 34–20 in the final in one of the greatest upsets in the sport's history.

Originally there was a plan to hold a World Cup in Australia in 2004, however the lack of competitiveness at the 2000 World Cup and rise of the Tri-Nations between Australia, New Zealand and Great Britain meant that plans for another World Cup were shelved.

For the World Cup to regain some credibility, the number of teams was reduced to ten with Australia, England, France, Papua New Guinea and New Zealand automatically qualifying and a qualifying tournament to determine the other five teams. The tournament ended a year of celebrations commemorating the centenary of the game in the Southern Hemisphere and was part of the Festival of World Cups.

== Format ==
=== Qualification ===
The hosts, Australia, were given automatic entry into the World Cup, along with New Zealand, England, France and Papua New Guinea. The five remaining places in the World Cup were determined by qualification rounds. Two European rounds and Pacific, Atlantic and Repêchage rounds were scheduled.

Tonga and Fiji became the first two nations to qualify after Tonga defeated Samoa 18–10 in Leeds on 22 October, forcing Samoa to enter the repêchage. In the European Group Two, Ireland drew 16–16 with Lebanon to ensure qualification, while Lebanon were forced to enter the repêchage. The final automatic place went to Scotland, who defeated Wales 37–32 on aggregate after two legs. Wales then faced Lebanon in the repêchage semi-final, where they lost in a surprise 50–26 defeat, to knock them out of World Cup Qualifying. Lebanon then faced Samoa, who beat USA 42–10 in the first semi-final, on 14 November for the final qualifying position. The game was won by Samoa, 38–16, and so they booked the tenth and final place. Many qualification matches were broadcast live by Sky Sports in the United Kingdom and New Zealand, whilst BigPondTV broadcast matches online for other fans around the world.

| Team | Nickname | Coach | Captain | RLIF Rank |
|---|---|---|---|---|
| Australia | The Kangaroos | Ricky Stuart | Darren Lockyer | 1 |
| England | The Lions | Tony Smith | Jamie Peacock | 3 |
| Fiji | The Bati | Joe Dakuitoga | Wes Naiqama | 6 |
| France | Les Chanticleers | John Monie | Jerome Guisset | 5 |
| Ireland | The Wolfhounds | Andy Kelly | Scott Grix | 9 |
| New Zealand | The Kiwis | Stephen Kearney | Nathan Cayless | 2 |
| Papua New Guinea | The Kumuls | Adrian Lam | John Wilshere | 7 |
| Samoa | Toa Samoa | John Ackland | Nigel Vagana | 12 |
| Scotland | The Bravehearts | Steve McCormack | Danny Brough | 11 |
| Tonga | Mate Ma'a Tonga | Jim Dymock | Lopini Paea | 4 |

=== Draw ===
The draw, after being confirmed by the RLIF on 19 April 2007, involved three groups. The first group was made up of four teams; Australia, England, New Zealand and Papua New Guinea. Whilst the other two groups involved three teams each. The semi finals were made up of the first three teams in the first group and the winner of a playoff between the winners of the second and third groups.

The draw was put into doubt after the Papua New Guinea team claimed that it was unfair to them and threatened to boycott the tournament should it not be changed. Marcus Bai, former Papua New Guinean winger and captain, said:

They have to change it and if they don't, we won't come. We will ring up the other island nations and teams elsewhere who don't qualify and we can have our own competition. They have shown no respect for our country or for our efforts to promote the game up there.

Fortunately for the tournament, this separate island competition did not eventuate. Papua New Guinea still remained upset with the draw, seeing it as a huge challenge but one which would have seen them be rewarded if they had won. The draw was finalised on 4 October 2007.

The first match took place in Townsville between England and Papua New Guinea, although the official opening ceremony of the competition occurred before the Australia and New Zealand match the following day in Sydney. The final took place at Lang Park (Suncorp Stadium) in Brisbane.

Teams received 2 points for a win, and 1-point for a draw. This meant that, unlike in the Australasian National Rugby League, there was no "golden point" rule enforced. In group stages, if two teams had the same number of points then positions were determined on points difference, the number of points scored minus the number of points conceded.

After group matches were completed, a match featuring the second placed teams in Group B and Group C took place with the winner receiving 7th place. Similarly the third placed teams in Group B and Group C played off for 9th place. It was believed that these results were to be taken into account in the 2009 RLIF World Rankings.

=== Squads ===
Each nation competing in the tournament named 24-man squads in the weeks prior to the group stage commencing.

== Venues ==
Due to Rugby League World Cup rules prohibiting the use of commercial venue names, all venues were known by their non-commercial names, e.g. Suncorp Stadium was known as Lang Park during the tournament. Lang Park would also host the World Cup final.

| Brisbane | Melbourne | Sydney | Gold Coast |
|---|---|---|---|
| Lang Park | Docklands Stadium | Sydney Football Stadium | Robina Stadium |
| Capacity: 52,500 | Capacity: 56,347 | Capacity: 42,500 | Capacity: 27,400 |
| Townsville | Newcastle | Canberra | Wollongong |
| Willows Sports Complex | Newcastle International Sports Centre | Canberra Stadium | Wollongong Showground |
| Capacity: 26,500 | Capacity: 26,126 | Capacity: 25,011 | Capacity: 23,000 |
| Sydney | Sydney | Gosford | Rockhampton |
| Penrith Stadium | Parramatta Stadium | Central Coast Stadium | Browne Park |
| Capacity: 22,500 | Capacity: 21,500 | Capacity: 20,059 | Capacity: 8,000 |
| 2008 Rugby League World Cup is located in Australia | | 2008 Rugby League World Cup is located in New South Wales | |

== Officiating ==
Six referees from four countries controlled matches in the tournament. These four nations also provided touch judges while England and Australia provided the video referees. In support of the Australian National Breast Cancer Foundation, the referees wore pastel pink shirts while officiating matches to raise awareness. The shirts, which carried the NBCF logo on the collar, were signed by the team captains at each World Cup game and were later auctioned off with the proceeds going to the NBCF.

Referees

- Thierry Alibert (France)
- Tony Archer (Australia)
- Steve Ganson (England)
- Shayne Hayne (Australia)
- Ashley Klein (England)
- Leon Williamson (New Zealand)

Video referees

- Steve Clark (Australia)
- Phil Cooley (Australia)
- Steve Ganson (England)
- Ashley Klein (England)
- Paul Simpkins (Australia)

Touch judges

- Adam Burns (New Zealand)
- Steve Chiddy (Australia)
- James Child (England)
- Tony De Las Hera (Australia)
- Paul Holland (Australia)
- Jose Perrara (France)
- Bernard Sutton (Australia)
- Gerard Sutton (Australia)
- Russell Turner (Australia)

== Opening ceremony ==
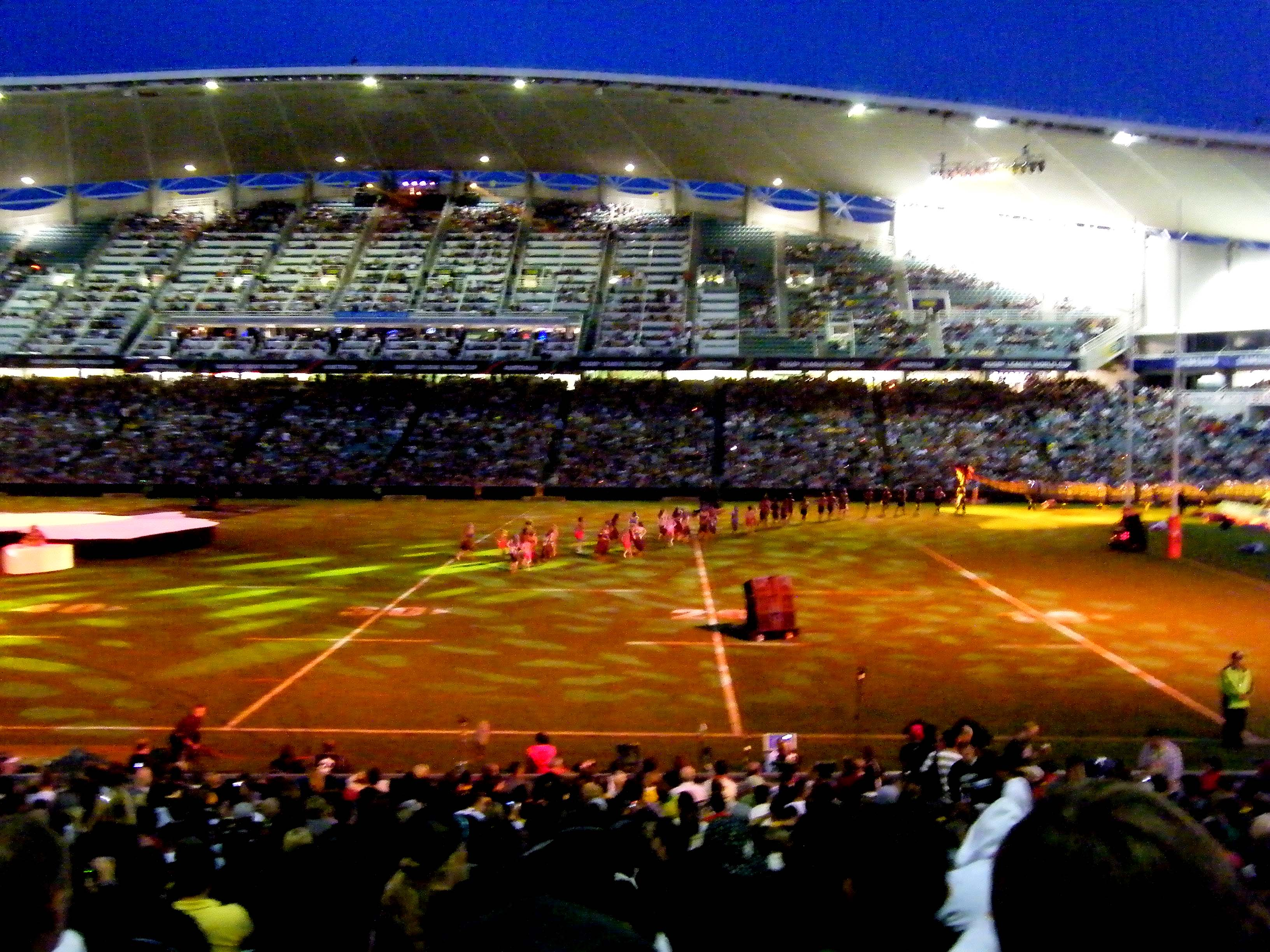
The 2008 World Cup's opening ceremony

On Sunday night, 26 October, the Sydney Football Stadium hosted the Opening Ceremony of the World Cup. It started with Greg Inglis reciting a speech about "Playing Fair". Following Inglis' speech there was an Aboriginal Smoking ceremony to welcome all the athletes and participants. This included a rather large sized Rainbow Serpent which represented the Aboriginal Dreamtime. The last part of the ceremony involved a performance of the Rugby League World Cup anthem "Hero" by Natalie Bassingthwaighte. A curtain raiser to the Australia vs. New Zealand match included an Indigenous Australian squad playing against New Zealand Māori which featured several prominent NRL players and rising stars, including Chris Sandow, Wairangi Koopu, Preston Campbell, Sam Thaiday, Shaun Kenny-Dowall and Carl Webb.

As part of the official opening of the World Cup on 26 October, an exhibition game was played between an Aboriginal selection and a New Zealand Māori side.

Welcome to Country Match

26 October 2008

| Indigenous Dreamtime | 34 – 26 | (Māori people) New Zealand Māori |
|---|---|---|
| Tries: Rod Jensen (33', 53') 2 Rhys Wesser (22', 71') 2 Justin Carney (18') 1 Yileen Gordon (80') 1 Goals: Jamie Soward 4/5 (20', 34', 54', 72'); Derrick Watkins 1/1 (80'); Field Goals: Jamie Soward 0/1 | Report; 1st: 16 - 8; 2nd: 18 - 18 | Tries: Sam McKendry (2') 1 Shaun Kenny-Dowall (25') 1 Chase Stanley (48') 1 Jordan Rapana (58') 1 Arana Taumata (67') 1 Goals: Bronx Goodwin 2/4 (49', 69'); Chase Stanley 1/1 (59') |

Sydney Football Stadium
Referee: Tony Archer

Team lists:

| FB | 1 | Rhys Wesser |
| WG | 2 | Justin Carney |
| CE | 3 | Maurice Blair |
| CE | 4 | Jamal Idris |
| WG | 5 | Ty Williams |
| FE | 6 | Jamie Soward |
| HB | 7 | Preston Campbell (c) |
| PR | 8 | Carl Webb |
| HK | 9 | Ian Lacey |
| PR | 17 | Peter Jensen |
| SR | 11 | Daine Laurie |
| SR | 12 | Derrick Watkins |
| LK | 13 | Dean Widders |
Interchange:
| IC | 14 | Chris Sandow |
| IC | 15 | Rod Jensen |
| IC | 16 | Yileen Gordon |
| IC | 10 | George Rose |
| IC | 18 | Dennis Moran |
Coach:
Neil Henry

| FB | 1 | Bronx Goodwin |
| WG | 2 | Jordan Rapana |
| CE | 3 | Chase Stanley |
| CE | 4 | Karl Johnson |
| WG | 5 | Shaun Kenny-Dowall |
| FE | 14 | Charlie Herekotukutuku |
| HB | 7 | Rangi Chase |
| PR | 8 | Weller Hauraki |
| HK | 9 | Ben Ellis (c) |
| PR | 10 | Sam McKendry |
| SR | 11 | Craig Smith |
| SR | 12 | Wairangi Koopu |
| LK | 13 | Lee Te Maari |
Interchange:
| IC | 6 | Arana Taumata |
| IC | 15 | Hep Cahill |
| IC | 16 | Chance Bunce |
| IC | 17 | James Tamou |
| IC | 18 | Kevin Proctor |
Coach:
Luke Goodwin

== Group stage ==
The 2008 Rugby League World Cup's eighteen matches were played during October and November in various locations throughout the east coast of Australia. The tournament's teams were divided into three pool groups. The teams finishing highest amongst those groups progressed to the play-offs.

All teams from group A (shaded in green) with the exception of the bottom qualifying team progressed to the semi-finals, the other two groups the top finisher progressed to a playoff match, in which the winner would qualify to the semi-finals.

=== Group A ===
| Pos | Team | Pld | W | D | L | PF | PA | PD | Pts | Qualification |
|---|---|---|---|---|---|---|---|---|---|---|
| 1 | Australia (H) | 3 | 3 | 0 | 0 | 128 | 16 | +112 | 6 | Advance to knockout stage |
| 2 | New Zealand | 3 | 2 | 0 | 1 | 90 | 60 | +30 | 4 | Advance to knockout stage |
| 3 | England | 3 | 1 | 0 | 2 | 60 | 110 | −50 | 2 | Advance to knockout stage |
| 4 | Papua New Guinea | 3 | 0 | 0 | 3 | 34 | 126 | −92 | 0 | |

(H) Hosts

25 October 2008
19:00 AEST (UTC+10:00)

| England | 32–22 | Papua New Guinea |
|---|---|---|
| Tries: Ade Gardner 12' c, 70' c Lee Smith 28' c, 51' m, 73' m Martin Gleeson 58' c Goals: Kevin Sinfield (4) | Report | Tries: Rod Griffin 20' c Jason Chan 36' c George Keppa 40' m Paul Aiton 75' c Goals: John Wilshere (3) |

Willows Sports Complex, Townsville
Attendance: 10,780
Referee: Shayne Hayne (Australia)
Player of the Match: James Roby (England)

26 October 2008
20:00 ADST (UTC+11:00)

| Australia | 30–6 | New Zealand |
|---|---|---|
| Tries: Greg Inglis 14' c Joel Monaghan 30' c Israel Folau 48' m, 80' c Billy Slater 60' c Goals: Johnathan Thurston (4); Cameron Smith (1) | Report | Tries: Manu 26' c Goals: Steve Matai (1) |

Sydney Football Stadium, Sydney
Attendance: 34,157
Referee: Ashley Klein (Australia)
Player of the Match: Johnathan Thurston (Australia)

1 November 2008
19:00 AEST (UTC+10:00)

| New Zealand | 48–6 | Papua New Guinea |
|---|---|---|
| Tries: Simon Mannering (2); Sam Perrett (2); Jerome Ropati; Issac Luke; David Fa'alogo; Adam Blair; Greg Eastwood; Goals: Krisnan Inu (5) | Report | Tries: David Moore; Goals: John Wilshire (1) |

Robina Stadium, Gold Coast
Attendance: 11,278
Referee: Steve Ganson (England)
Player of the Match: Adam Blair (New Zealand)

2 November 2008
20:00 ADST (UTC+11:00)

| Australia | 52–4 | England |
|---|---|---|
| Tries: Billy Slater 5', 63', 70'; Greg Inglis 10', 33'; Anthony Laffranchi 37', 77'; Joel Monaghan 56'; Scott Prince 65'; Goals: Scott Prince (8/10) | Report | Tries: James Roby 20'; Goals: Kevin Sinfield (0/1) |

Docklands Stadium, Melbourne
Attendance: 36,297
Referee: Tony Archer (Australia)
Player of the Match: Billy Slater (Australia)

8 November 2008
20:00 ADST (UTC+11:00)

| England | 24–36 | New Zealand |
|---|---|---|
| Tries: Rob Burrow (2); Mickey Higham; Martin Gleeson; Goals: Rob Purdham (4) | Report | Tries: Manu Vatuvei (4); Lance Hohaia; Jason Nightingale; Nathan Fien; Goals: Issac Luke (3); Jeremy Smith (1) |

Newcastle International Sports Centre, Newcastle
Attendance: 15,145
Referee: Tony Archer (Australia)
Player of the Match: Manu Vatuvei (New Zealand)

9 November 2008
19:00 AEST (UTC+10:00)

| Australia | 46–6 | Papua New Guinea |
|---|---|---|
| Tries: David Williams (3); Scott Prince (2); Joel Monaghan; Anthony Tupou; Goals: Johnathan Thurston (7) | Report | Tries: Menzie Yere; Goals: John Wilshire (1) |

Willows Sports Complex, Townsville
Attendance: 16,239
Referee: Steve Ganson (England)
Player of the Match: Craig Fitzgibbon (Australia)

=== Group B ===
| Pos | Team | Pld | W | D | L | PF | PA | PD | Pts | Qualification |
|---|---|---|---|---|---|---|---|---|---|---|
| 1 | Fiji | 2 | 1 | 0 | 1 | 58 | 24 | +34 | 2 | Advance to knockout stage |
| 2 | Scotland | 2 | 1 | 0 | 1 | 36 | 52 | −16 | 2 | |
| 3 | France | 2 | 1 | 0 | 1 | 42 | 60 | −18 | 2 | |

26 October 2008
17:25 ADST (UTC+11:00)

| France | 36–18 | Scotland |
|---|---|---|
| Tries: Jared Taylor 16' c Jérôme Guisset 28' c, 75' c John Wilson 33' c Sébastien Raguin 54' c Christophe Moly 80' c Goals: Thomas Bosc (6) | Report | Tries: Jon Steel 20' c Oliver Wilkes 46' c Dean Colton 62' c Goals: Danny Brough (3) |

Canberra Stadium, Canberra
Attendance: 9,287
Referee: Leon Williamson (New Zealand)

1 November 2008
17:25 ADST (UTC+11:00)

| Fiji | 42–6 | France |
|---|---|---|
| Tries: Akuila Uate (3); Jarryd Hayne (2); Iowane Divavesi; Semisi Tora; Goals: Wes Naiqama (7) | Report | Tries: John Wilson Goals: Thomas Bosc (1) |

Wollongong Showground, Wollongong
Attendance: 9,213
Referee: Ashley Klein (England)
Player of the Match: Jarryd Hayne (Fiji)

5 November 2008
19:55 ADST (UTC+11:00)

| Scotland | 18–16 | Fiji |
|---|---|---|
| Tries: Jon Steel; Michael Robertson; Oliver Wilkes; Goals: Danny Brough (3) | Report | Tries: Semi Tadulala (2); Jason Bukuya Goals: Wes Naiqama (2) |

Central Coast Stadium, Gosford
Attendance: 9,720
Referee: Leon Williamson (New Zealand)

=== Group C ===
| Pos | Team | Pld | W | D | L | PF | PA | PD | Pts | Qualification |
|---|---|---|---|---|---|---|---|---|---|---|
| 1 | Ireland | 2 | 1 | 0 | 1 | 54 | 38 | +16 | 2 | Advance to knockout stage |
| 2 | Tonga | 2 | 1 | 0 | 1 | 34 | 40 | −6 | 2 | |
| 3 | Samoa | 2 | 1 | 0 | 1 | 36 | 46 | −10 | 2 | |

27 October 2008
18:55 ADST (UTC+11:00)

| Tonga | 22–20 | Ireland |
|---|---|---|
| Tries: Michael Jennings 10' c Cooper Vuna 36' m Etuate Uaisele 59' c Esikeli Tonga 74' m Goals: Joel Taufa'ao (2); Tony Williams (1) | Report | Tries: Damien Blanch 26' m, 51' m, 67' c Michael Platt 30' c Goals: Pat Richards (2) |

Parramatta Stadium, Sydney
Attendance: 6,165
Referee: Steve Ganson (England)

31 October 2008
18:55 ADST (UTC+11:00)

| Samoa | 20–12 | Tonga |
|---|---|---|
| Tries: Francis Meli; Nigel Vagana; Matt Utai; George Carmont; Goals: Ben Roberts (2) | Report | Tries: Michael Jennings; Tevita Leo-Latu Goals: Tony Williams (2) |

Penrith Stadium, Sydney
Attendance: 11,787
Referee: Shayne Hayne (Australia)

5 November 2008
18:55 ADST (UTC+11:00)

| Ireland | 34–16 | Samoa |
|---|---|---|
| Tries: Pat Richards 12', 43', 79'; Simon Finnigan 14'; Sean Gleeson 19'; Liam Finn 71'; Goals: Pat Richards (5) | Report | Tries: Nigel Vagana 25'; Misi Taulapapa 35'; David Solomona 75' Goals: Ben Roberts (2) |

Parramatta Stadium, Sydney
Attendance: 8,067
Referee: Thierry Alibert (France)
Player of the Match: Pat Richards (Ireland)

== Knockout stage ==
The top three teams from pool A advanced to the semi-finals, while the top teams from pools B and C played off in the qualifying final to decide the fourth spot in the semi-finals.

Quarter-final
B1 | Fiji | 30
C1 | Ireland | 14

Semi-finals
A2 | New Zealand | 32
A3 | England | 22
A1 | Australia | 52
Fiji | 0

Final
New Zealand | 34
Australia | 20

=== 7th place play-off ===
8 November 2008
16:00 AEST (UTC+10:00)

| Scotland | 0–48 | Tonga |
|---|---|---|
| | Report | Tries: Vuna (2); Mateo; Paea; Uaisele; Williams; Talanoa; Jennings; Goals: Williams (7); Paea |

Browne Park, Rockhampton
Attendance: 5,930
Referee: Shane Hayne (Australia)

=== 9th place play-off ===
9 November 2008
17:25 ADST (UTC+11:00)

| France | 10–42 | Samoa |
|---|---|---|
| Tries: Guisset; Planas; Goals: Bosc | Report | Tries: Te'o (2); Utai; Meli; Carmont; Taulapapa; Roberts; T. Puletua; Goals: Roberts (3); Paulo (2) |

Penrith Stadium, Sydney
Attendance: 8,028
Referee: Thierry Alibert (France)

=== Quarter-final ===
10 November 2008
18:55 AEST (UTC+10:00)

| Fiji | 30–14 | Ireland |
|---|---|---|
| Tries: Uate (2); Bukuya; Hayne; Naiqama; Goals: Wes Naiqama (5/6) | Report | Tries: Blanch (2); Grix; Goals: Richards (1/4) |

Robina Stadium, Gold Coast
Attendance: 8,224
Referee: Ashley Klein (England)
Player of the Match: Aaron Groom (Fiji)

=== Semi-finals ===
15 November 2008
18:55 AEST (UTC+10:00)

| New Zealand | 32–22 | England |
|---|---|---|
| Tries: Ropati (2); Perrett; Hohaia; Harrison; Marshall; Goals: Smith (3); Marshall | Report | Tries: McGuire (2); Peacock; Gleeson; Goals: Burrow (3) |

Lang Park, Brisbane
Attendance: 26,659
Referee: Shane Hayne (Australia)
Player of the Match: Benji Marshall (New Zealand)

16 November 2008
19:55 ADST (UTC+11:00)

| Australia | 52–0 | Fiji |
|---|---|---|
| Tries: Gallen 2'; Tate (2) 5', 16'; Slater (3) 9', 38', 49'; Thurston (3) 62', 66', 72'; Inglis 77'; Goals: Thurston (6/10) | Report |

Sydney Football Stadium, Sydney
Attendance: 15,855
Referee: Ashley Klein (England)
Player of the Match: Billy Slater (Australia)

=== Final: Australia vs New Zealand ===
22 November 2008
19:00 AEST (UTC+10:00)

| Australia | 20–34 | New Zealand |
|---|---|---|
| Tries: Lockyer 11', 35'; Williams 15'; Inglis 64'; Goals: Thurston (2/4) | Report | Tries: Hohaia 53', 70' (pen.); Smith 24'; Ropati 28'; Marshall 60'; Blair 75'; Goals: Luke (3/3); Marshall (2/3) |

Lang Park, Brisbane
Attendance: 50,599
Referee: Ashley Klein (England)
Player of the Match: Darren Lockyer

== Statistics ==
=== Try scorers ===
7 tries

- (Australia) Billy Slater

6 tries

- (Australia) Greg Inglis

5 tries

- (Fiji) Akuila Uate
- (Ireland) Damien Blanch

4 tries

- (Australia) Joel Monaghan
- (Australia) David Williams
- (New Zealand) Lance Hohaia
- (New Zealand) Jerome Ropati
- (New Zealand) Manu Vatuvei

3 tries

- (Australia) Scott Prince
- (Australia) Johnathan Thurston
- (England) Martin Gleeson
- (England) Lee Smith
- (Fiji) Jarryd Hayne
- (France) Jérôme Guisset
- (Ireland) Pat Richards
- (New Zealand) Sam Perrett
- (Tonga) Michael Jennings

2 tries

- (Australia) Israel Folau
- (Australia) Anthony Laffranchi
- (Australia) Darren Lockyer
- (Australia) Brent Tate
- (England) Rob Burrow
- (England) Ade Gardner
- (England) Danny McGuire
- (Fiji) Jayson Bukuya
- (Fiji) Semi Tadulala
- (France) John Wilson
- (New Zealand) Adam Blair
- (New Zealand) Simon Mannering
- (New Zealand) Benji Marshall
- (Papua New Guinea) George Keppa
- (Samoa) George Carmont
- (Samoa) Francis Meli
- (Samoa) Misi Taulapapa
- (Samoa) Ben Te'o
- (Samoa) Matt Utai
- (Samoa) Nigel Vagana
- (Scotland) Jon Steel
- (Scotland) Oliver Wilkes
- (Tonga) Etuate Uaisele

1 try

- (Australia) Paul Gallen
- (Australia) Anthony Tupou
- (England) Jamie Peacock
- (England) Mickey Higham
- (England) James Roby
- (France) Christophe Moly
- (France) Sébastien Planas
- (France) Sébastien Raguin
- (France) Jared Taylor
- (Fiji) Iowane Divavesi
- (Fiji) Semisi Tora
- (Fiji) Wes Naiqama
- (Ireland) Liam Finn
- (Ireland) Simon Finnigan
- (Ireland) Sean Gleeson
- (Ireland) Scott Grix
- (Ireland) Michael Platt
- (New Zealand) Greg Eastwood
- (New Zealand) David Fa'alogo
- (New Zealand) Nathan Fien
- (New Zealand) Bronson Harrison
- (New Zealand) Issac Luke
- (New Zealand) Sika Manu
- (New Zealand) Jason Nightingale
- (Papua New Guinea) Paul Aiton
- (Papua New Guinea) Jason Chan
- (Papua New Guinea) Rod Griffin
- (Papua New Guinea) Menzie Yere
- (Samoa) Joseph Paulo
- (Samoa) Frank Puletua
- (Samoa) Ben Roberts
- (Samoa) David Solomona
- (Scotland) Paddy Coupar
- (Scotland) Michael Robertson
- (Tonga) Tevita Leo-Latu
- (Tonga) Feleti Mateo
- (Tonga) Eddie Paea
- (Tonga) Fetuli Talanoa
- Esikeli Tonga
- (Tonga) Tony Williams

=== Attendances ===
| Date | Match | | Venue | Location | Attendance |
|---|---|---|---|---|---|
| 25 October 2008 | England | Papua New Guinea | Willows Sports Complex | Townsville | 10,780 |
| 26 October 2008 | Australia | New Zealand | Sydney Football Stadium | Sydney | 34,157 |
| 26 October 2008 | France | Scotland | Canberra Stadium | Canberra | 9,287 |
| 27 October 2008 | Tonga | Ireland | Parramatta Stadium | Sydney | 6,165 |
| 31 October 2008 | Samoa | Tonga | Penrith Stadium | Sydney | 11,787 |
| 1 November 2008 | Fiji | France | Wollongong Showground | Wollongong | 9,213 |
| 1 November 2008 | New Zealand | Papua New Guinea | Robina Stadium | Gold Coast | 11,278 |
| 2 November 2008 | Australia | England | Docklands Stadium | Melbourne | 36,297 |
| 5 November 2008 | Ireland | Samoa | Parramatta Stadium | Sydney | 8,067 |
| 5 November 2008 | Scotland | Fiji | Central Coast Stadium | Gosford | 9,720 |
| 8 November 2008 | Scotland | Tonga | Browne Park | Rockhampton | 5,942 |
| 8 November 2008 | England | New Zealand | Newcastle International Sports Centre | Newcastle | 15,145 |
| 9 November 2008 | Australia | Papua New Guinea | Willows Sports Complex | Townsville | 16,239 |
| 9 November 2008 | France | Samoa | Penrith Stadium | Sydney | 8,028 |
| 10 November 2008 | Fiji | Ireland | Robina Stadium | Gold Coast | 8,224 |
| 15 November 2008 | New Zealand | England | Lang Park | Brisbane | 26,659 |
| 16 November 2008 | Australia | Fiji | Sydney Football Stadium | Sydney | 15,855 |
| 22 November 2008 | Australia | New Zealand | Lang Park | Brisbane | 50,599 |

== Critical reception ==
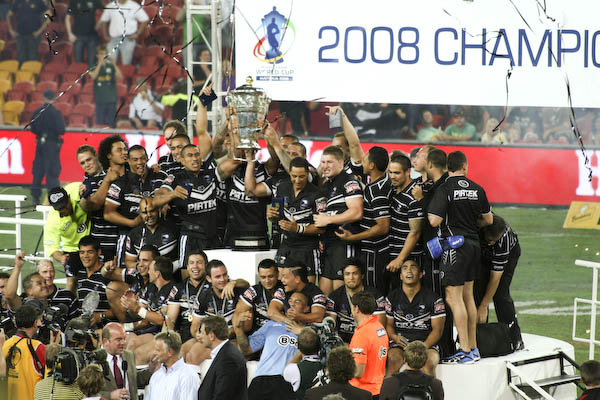
New Zealand lifting the Paul Barrière Trophy after their victory in the final.

Due to the generally poor response of the 2000 World Cup, there were several key criticisms of the tournament before any matches had kicked off. The RLIF were forced to defend the credibility of the tournament in October 2007 after New Zealand, one of the favourites for the competition, were heavily beaten in a Test match 58–0 in Wellington against Australia. Another concern was whether there would be enough competitiveness throughout the ten teams, with some fans worried about the possibility of too many one-sided matches, which was a common sight in the Group Stages of the 2000 tournament.

Ricky Stuart, coach of the Australian team, was reported to be so incensed by his team's defeat in the final that he verbally attacked Geoff Carr, the chief executive of Australian Rugby League, claiming that tournament organisers and match officials conspired to cause the Australian loss. The next morning he had a chance meeting with Ashley Klein, who refereed the final, and Stuart Cummings, the Rugby Football League's director of match officials, at their hotel. He reportedly abused both officials in front of a number of witnesses, calling Klein a cheat, and behaved in an aggressive and physically intimidating manner. Stuart later apologised for his behaviour and resigned from his post.

The tournament proved a commercial success, delivering a profit of over A$6.5 million and re-establishing the credibility of the competition.

== Marketing ==
=== Branding ===
Promotional video scene

Heroes Here 08 strapline

The World Cup's "Heroes Here 08" promotional campaign was launched at the Sydney Opera House on 6 May 2008. At the launch, Paul Kind, the World Cup Director of Marketing, explained, "Heroes Here 08 underlines that fact that the international game, and particularly this tournament, will bring out the best in every player who takes part. It will create heroes."

Natalie Bassingthwaighte recorded an "Australian version" of the Mariah Carey song "Hero" which accompanied the "Heroes 08" promotional video and other World Cup advertising. The World Cup Opening Ceremony featured a live performance of the song by Bassingthwaighte.

Filming of visuals for the promotional video began in Leeds during the worldwide ticketing launch for the event in November 2007.

Advertising agency MJW, photographer Garry Heery, and production company Engine collaborated on a production that used digital animation and a dark set to depict players representing their country internationally.

The Heroes campaign featured Mark Gasnier (Australia), Roy Asotasi (New Zealand), Rob Burrow (England), Keith Peters (PNG), Waisale Sukanaveita (Fiji), Nigel Vagana (Samoa), Jerome Guisset (France), Lee Paterson (Scotland), Stuart Littler (Ireland) and Lopini Paea (Tonga). Gasnier was later removed from some of the promotional material after he left the sport mid-season and was replaced by Darren Lockyer.

The video also appeared in the video game Rugby League 2: World Cup Edition, which featured a world cup mode based on the event.

=== Ticketing ===
Tickets for Australian residents went on sale 7 November 2007 and internationally on 18 February. However tickets were not distributed until 3 March. Ticketek were announced as the official ticketing agency for the competition, selling tickets for all matches. Ticketmaster and Pilbeam Theatre were selling tickets to the Telstra Dome and Browne Park matches respectively.

The World Cup final sold out months in advance.

=== Sponsorship ===
The Official Sponsors of the Rugby League World Cup 2008 were:

- Jetstar: Official Airline
- Foster's: Official Beer
- Bundaberg Rum: Official Spirit
- AAMI: Official referee sponsor
- Telstra: Official Telecommunications sponsor
- Gillette: Official Male products
- Holiday Inn: Official Accommodation Supplier
- Coca-Cola: Official Soft drink
- Harvey Norman: Official retailer
- Bic: Official stationery

== Broadcasting ==
=== Television ===
The 2008 World Cup had 26 separate television deals taking coverage to 127 countries and generating more than $20 million income. A global television audience of 19.2 million made it the most widely broadcast event in the game's history.

Channel 9 broadcast all Group A matches and the Knockout Stage matches in Australia. Fox Sports broadcast all Group B and C matches plus Ranking Stage matches live. In the United Kingdom, Sky Sports broadcast all matches live, meaning that all were shown in the morning and some as early as 06:00 am with highlights being shown on the BBC. Sky Sport showed all games live across New Zealand. Mai TV broadcast all matches live in Papua New Guinea, Fiji, Samoa, Cook Islands and the Solomon Islands. Orange Sport provided coverage of all matches live in France.

Coverage of the competition also extended to countries not taking part. Showtime showed all matches live across the Middle East. G offered coverage of all games in many countries in Africa. Astro showed all matches in Malaysia, and ESPN360 showed all matches in the United States. In Brazil, some matches were broadcast by Bandsports.

The only participating country with no television coverage of the matches was Tonga; the RLIF were hoping to secure a deal before the World Cup started, but this never happened.

BigPondTV, an online television station, broadcast all matches live and also repeated matches. This service was available to everyone for free.

=== Radio ===
- UK – BBC Radio 5 Live and its sister station BBC Radio 5 Live Sports Extra broadcast selected games.
- UK – some non-rights holders used Australian freelance reporter Tim Stackpool to report on games for UK broadcasters. An extensive archive can be heard here: RLWC Archive
- AUS – ABC and 2GB Radio broadcast selected games.
- NZ – Radio Sport broadcast the Kiwi's games, including the Kiwi's victory in the final.
