= 2010 Rugby League European Cup =

- Number of teams: 4
- Winner: Wales
- Matches played: 6
- Attendance: 35,687 (5,948 per match)
- Top scorer: (Ireland) Gregg McNally (30)
- Top try scorer: (Wales) Rhys Williams (5)

The 2010 Rugby League European Cup, known as the Alitalia European Cup for sponsorship purposes, is a rugby league football tournament. Three of the competing teams participated in the 2009 Rugby League European Cup, with France also being included in the tournament after competing in the 2009 Four Nations. The winner of the competition, Wales, competed in the 2011 Four Nations tournament.

== Squads ==
=== France ===
preliminary squad:

- Coach: (England) Bobbie Goulding

Club Team	Players
(France) AS Carcassonne	Romaric Bemba, Roman Gagliazzo, Teddy Sadaoui
(France) Catalans Dragons	Jean-Philippe Baile, Thomas Bosc, Rémi Casty, Olivier Elima (c), Jamal Fakir, David Ferriol, Cyril Gossard, Clint Greenshields, Grégory Mounis, Sébastien Raguin
(France) Lézignan Sangliers	Matthew Alberola, Thibault Ancely, Andrew Bentley, Julian Bousquet, Nicolas Munoz, Florian Quintilla, Micheal Tribillac
(Australia) Melbourne Storm	Dane Chisholm
(France) Pia Donkeys	Maxime Grésèque, Christophe Moly
(Australia) Sydney Roosters	Jason Baitieri
(France) Toulouse Olympique	Vincent Duport, Mathieu Griffi, Kevin Larroyer, Antoni Maria, Yoan Tisseyre
(France) Union Treiziste Catalans	William Barthau, Kane Bentley, Tony Gigot, Sebastien Martins, Quentin Nauroy, Éloi Pélissier, Michael Simon, Cyril Stacul, Julien Touxagas, Frédéric Vaccari

=== Ireland ===
30 Man Squad

- Coach: (England) Andy Kelly

Club Team	Players
(England) Barrow Raiders	Liam Harrison, Brett McDermott
(England) Batley Bulldogs	Sean Hesketh
(England) Bradford Bulls	Michael Platt
(Ireland) Carlow Crusaders	Paddy Barcoe
(England) Dewsbury Rams	Matthew Fox
(England) Featherstone Rovers	Liam Finn
(England) Halifax	Bob Beswick
(England) Harlequins RL	Jason Golden, Jamie O'Callaghan
(England) Huddersfield Giants	Simon Finnigan, Scott Grix, Gregg McNally
(Ireland) Irish Students	Adam Aigbokhae
(England) Leeds Rhinos	Luke Ambler, Kyle Amor
(England) Leeds Met	Stevie Gibbons
(Ireland) North Dublin Eagles	Joseph Taylor
(England) Oldham	John Gillam, Wayne Kerr, Marcus St Hilaire, Matty Ashe
(England) Salford City Reds	Sean Gleeson, Ryan Boyle
(England) Sheffield Eagles	Tim Bergin
(Ireland) Treaty City Titans	Brendan Guilfoyle
(England) Warrington Wolves	Simon Grix, Tyrone McCarthy
(England) Widnes Vikings	David Allen
(England) Wigan Warriors	Michael McIlorum, Eamon O'Carroll

=== Scotland ===
Preliminary Squad

- Coach: (England) Steve McCormack

Club Team	Players
(England) Batley Bulldogs	Gareth Moore
(England) Bradford Bulls	Joe Wardle
(France) Carpentras XIII	Lee Paterson
(England) Castleford Panthers	Jamie Benn
(England) Coventry Bears	Brad Massey
(England) Doncaster	Dean Colton, Rob Lunt
(Scotland) Edinburgh Eagles	Craig Borthwick, Giles Lomax
(England) Featherstone Rovers	Jon Steel
(England) Gateshead Thunder	Crawford Matthews
(England) Halifax	Sam Barlow
(England) Harlequins RL	Oliver Wilkes
(England) Huddersfield Giants	Danny Brough
(England) Hull Kingston Rovers	Ben Fisher
(England) Hunslet Hawks	Neil Lowe
(England) Leigh Centurions	John Duffy
(England) London Skolars	Dave Arnot
(England) Sheffield Eagles	Andrew Henderson, Jack Howieson, Brendon Lindsay, Mitch Stringer, Alex Szostak
(England) Swinton Lions	Richard Hawkyard
(England) Wakefield Trinity Wildcats	Dale Ferguson, Kevin Henderson
(England) Whitehaven	Dexter Miller, Spencer Miller
(England) Workington Town	Brett Carter, Paddy Coupar

=== Wales ===
48 Man Squad:

- Coach: (Wales) Iestyn Harris

Club Team	Players
(France) AS Carcassonne	Gareth Dean
(England) Barrow Raiders	Andy Bracek, Matt James
(England) Batley Bulldogs	Byron Smith
(England) Bradford Bulls	Craig Kopczak
(Australia) Burleigh Bears	Mark Lennon
(England) Castleford Tigers	James Evans
(Australia) Central Queensland Comets	Chris Beasley, Ian Webster
(Wales) Crusaders	Anthony Blackwood, Ben Flower, Chris Davies, Dafydd Carter, Elliot Kear, Gareth Thomas, Gil Dudson, Jack Pring, Jamie Murphy, Jordan James, Lee Williams, Lewis Mills, Lloyd White, Luke Dyer, Rhodri Lloyd
(England) Featherstone Rovers	Ross Divorty
(England) Gateshead Thunder	Matt Barron
(England) Halifax	Sean Penkywicz
(England) Hull Kingston Rovers	David Mills
(England) Leeds Met	Rhys Griffiths
(England) Leigh East	Owain Brown
(England) London Skolars	Matt Thomas
(Australia) Mackay Cutters	Neil Budworth
South Wales Scorpions	Aled James, Andrew Gay, Ashley Bateman, Christiaan Roets, Geraint Davies, Joe Burke, Lewis Reece, Steve Parry
(England) St Helens R.F.C.	Jacob Emmitt
(England) Swinton Lions	Ian Watson, Phil Joseph
(England) Warrington Wolves	Ben Evans, Rhys Evans, Rhys Williams
(England) Wigan Warriors	Ben Davies
Unattached	Mark Roberts

== Standings ==
Team	Played	Won	Drew	Lost	For	Against	Diff	Points
Wales	3	3	0	0	103	63	+40	6
France	3	2	0	1	95	48	+47	4
Scotland	3	1	0	2	76	108	-32	2
Ireland	3	0	0	3	76	131	-55	0

== Pre-tournament matches ==
Wales announced that they would be playing two friendly warm-up matches against Italy at the Racecourse Ground in Wrexham on 3 and 6 October in preparation for the European Cup. However the first match was cancelled due to a waterlogged pitch, making it a one-off match.

=== Wales vs Italy ===
6 October 2010
19:30

Wales	6–13	Italy
Try: Gareth Thomas; Goal: Lewis Reece (1/1)	Report	Tries: Christophe Caligari; Ben Falcone; Goals: Josh Mantellato (2/2); Field Goal: Ben Stewart

Racecourse Ground, Wrexham, Wales
Attendance: 2,971
Referee: Ben Thaler (Rugby Football League)

== Fixtures ==
=== Round 1 ===
9 October 2010

France	58–24	Ireland
Tries: Olivier Elima (4), Rémi Casty, Teddy Sadaoui, Cyril Stacul, Tony Gigot, Andrew Bentley, Jason Baitieri; Goals: Maxime Grésèque (4), Nicolas Munoz (5)	Report	Tries: John Gillam (2), Sean Hesketh, Jamie O'Callaghan, Greg McNally; Goals: Greg McNally, Liam Finn

Parc des Sports, Avignon, France
Attendance: 14,522
Referee: Phil Bentham (England)
Player of the Match: Rémi Casty

10 October 2010

Scotland	22–60	Wales
Tries: Ben Fisher (2), Andrew Henderson (2)	Report	Tries: Rhys Williams (3), Elliot Kear (3), Gareth Thomas, Mark Lennon, Lloyd White, Jacob Emmitt, Jordan James; Goals: Lee Briers (8)

Old Anniesland, Glasgow, Scotland
Attendance: 787
Referee: Thierry Alibert (France)

=== Round 2 ===
16 October 2010

France	26–12	Scotland
Tries: Frédéric Vaccari, Tony Gigot, Sébastien Martins, Mickaël Simon, Kane Bentley; Goals: T Munoz (3)	Report	Tries: Alex Szostack, Sam Barlow; Goals: T Danny Brough (2)

Stade Municipal d'Albi, Albi, France
Attendance: 7,150
Referee: Phil Bentham

Teams:

FRANCE: 1. William Barthau, 2. Frédéric Vaccari, 3. Jean-Philippe Baile, 4. Teddy Sadaoui, 5. Cyril Stacul, 6. Tony Gigot, 7. Nicolas Munoz, 8. Mickaël Simon, 9. Kane Bentley, 10. Rémi Casty, 11. Olivier Elima, 12. Julien Touxagas, 13. Jason Baitieri. Subs: 14. Andrew Bentley, 15. Mathieu Griffi, 16. Sébastien Martins, 17. Romaric Bemba.

SCOTLAND: 1 Lee Paterson, 2. Dave Arnot, 3. Joe Wardle, 4. Kevin Henderson, 5. Jon Steel, 6. Brendan Lindsay, 7. Danny Brough, 8. Oliver Wilkes, 9. Ben Fisher, 10, Mitch Stringer, 11. Alex Szostak, 12. Sam Barlow, 13. Dale Ferguson. Subs: 14. Andrew Henderson, 15. Paddy Coupar, 16. Neil Lowe, 17. Jack Howieson.

17 October 2010

Wales	31–30	Ireland
Tries: Lennon (2), Webster, Williams (2), Roets; Goals: White (3); Drop-goal: Briers.	Report	Tries: Bergin, McNally (2), Boyle, Ambler; Goals: McNally (5)

The Gnoll, Neath, Wales
Attendance: 2,165
Referee: Thierry Alibert (France)
Player of the Match: Gregg McNally

=== Round 3 ===
23 October 2010

France	11–12	Wales
Tries: Nauroy, Sadaoui; Goals: Munoz (1/2); Drop goals: Gigot	Report	Tries: Williams, Thomas; Goals: White (2/3)

Stade Municipal d'Albi, Albi, France
Attendance: 10,413
Referee: Phil Bentham (England)

- Wales are Champions and will play in the 2011 Four Nations.

24 October 2010

Ireland	22–42	Scotland
Tries: Gillam (5, 65) Grix (15), Finn (38); Goals:McNally (3/4)	Report	Tries: Fisher, K.Henderson, A.Henderson, Ferguson 2, Carter, Stringer, Wardle; Goals:Patterson (5/8)

Tallaght Stadium, Dublin, Ireland
Attendance: 1,063
Referee: Thierry Alibert (France)
Player of the Match: Dale Ferguson
