= 2008 Rugby League World Cup squads =

The 2008 Rugby League World Cup featured the national teams (selected from twenty-four-man squads) of ten nations: Australia, England, New Zealand, Papua New Guinea, Fiji, France, Scotland, Ireland, Samoa, and Tonga.

== Pool A ==
=== Australia ===
Head coach: Ricky Stuart (Australia)
Assistant coaches: John Cartwright and Allan Langer

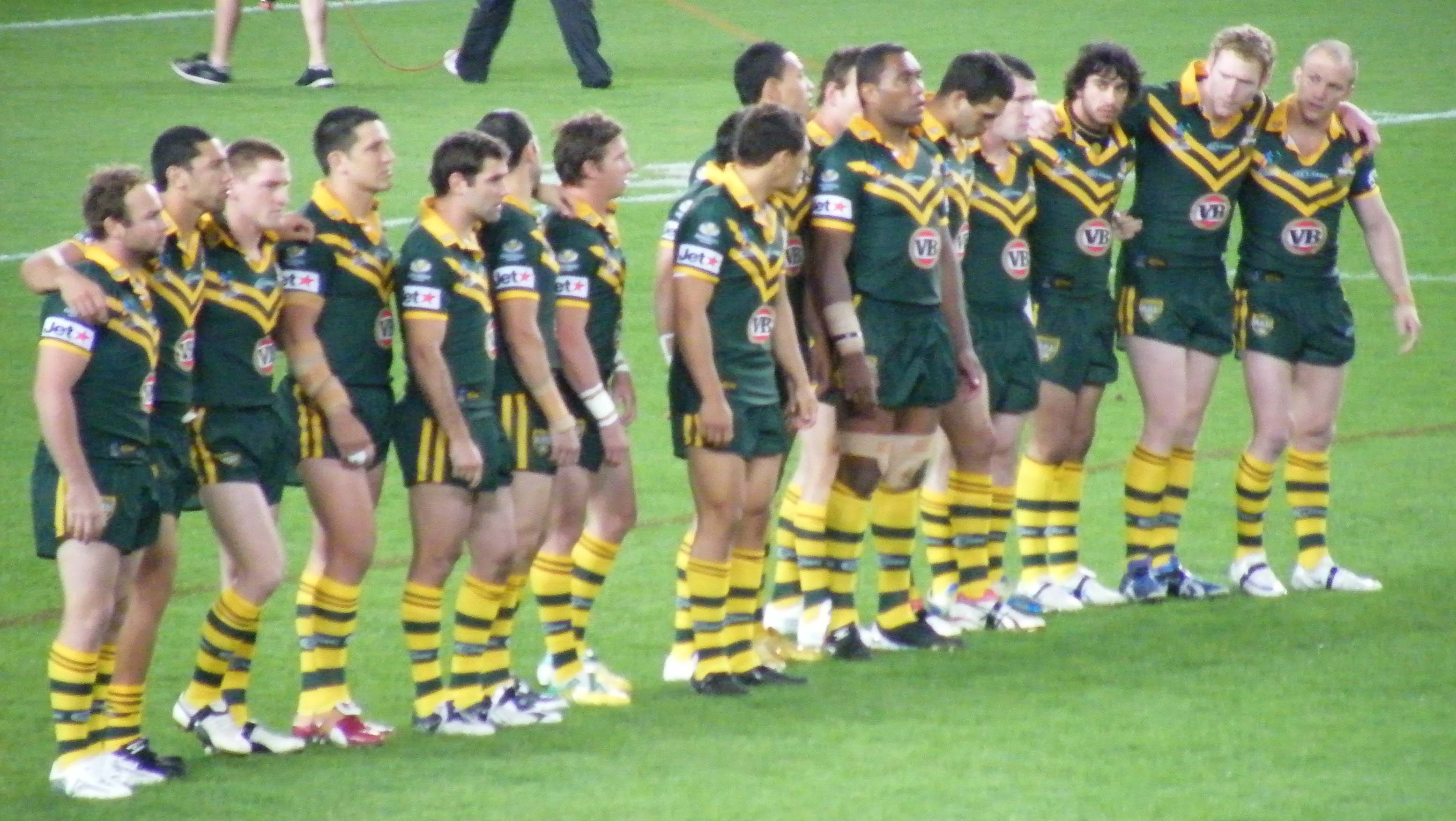

Player	Games	Points	Position	Club
Darren Lockyer (capt)	4	8	FE	Brisbane Broncos
Darius Boyd^{1}	1	0	WG	Brisbane Broncos
Terry Campese	1	0	FE	Canberra Raiders
Petero Civoniceva	4	0	PR	Penrith Panthers
Craig Fitzgibbon	3	0	SR	Sydney Roosters
Israel Folau	5	8	CE	Melbourne Storm
Paul Gallen	5	4	SR	Cronulla-Sutherland Sharks
Kurt Gidley	1	0	UB	Newcastle Knights
Karmichael Hunt^{1}	3	0	FB	Brisbane Broncos
Greg Inglis	4	24	UB	Melbourne Storm
Brent Kite	5	0	PR	Manly-Warringah Sea Eagles
Anthony Laffranchi	4	8	SR	Gold Coast Titans
Joel Monaghan	5	16	CE	Canberra Raiders
Josh Perry	3	0	PR	Manly-Warringah Sea Eagles
Steve Price	4	0	PR	New Zealand Warriors
Scott Prince	2	24	HB	Gold Coast Titans
Billy Slater	4	28	FB	Melbourne Storm
Cameron Smith	5	2	HK	Melbourne Storm
Glenn Stewart	4	0	SR	Manly-Warringah Sea Eagles
Brent Tate	4	8	CE	New Zealand Warriors
Johnathan Thurston	4	50	HB	North Queensland Cowboys
Anthony Tupou^{2}	5	4	SR	Sydney Roosters
Anthony Watmough	2	0	SR	Manly-Warringah Sea Eagles
David Williams	2	16	WG	Manly-Warringah Sea Eagles

^{1} Replaced originally selected Brett Stewart and Justin Hodges who withdrew on 16 October.

^{2} Replaced originally selected Michael Crocker who withdrew due to injury on 9 October.

=== England ===
Head coach: Tony Smith (Australia) / (England)
Assistant coach: Steve McNamara

Player	Games	Points	Position	Club
Jamie Peacock (capt)	4	4	PR	Leeds Rhinos
Rob Burrow	4	22	SH	Leeds Rhinos
Mark Calderwood	3	0	WG	Wigan Warriors
Gareth Ellis	4	0	SR	Leeds Rhinos
Maurie Fa'asavalu	2	0	PR	St. Helens
Ade Gardner	3	8	WG	St. Helens
Martin Gleeson	4	12	CE	Warrington Wolves
James Graham	3	0	PR	St. Helens
Mickey Higham	2	4	HK	Warrington Wolves
Gareth Hock	4	0	SR	Wigan Warriors
Jamie Jones-Buchanan	1	0	SR	Leeds Rhinos
Jamie Langley	1	0	LF	Bradford Bulls
Danny McGuire	3	8	FE	Leeds Rhinos
Adrian Morley	4	0	PR	Warrington Wolves
Leon Pryce	3	0	SO	St. Helens
Rob Purdham	2	0	LF	Harlequins RL
James Roby	3	4	HK	St. Helens
Keith Senior	4	0	CE	Leeds Rhinos
Kevin Sinfield	3	8	LK	Leeds Rhinos
Lee Smith	2	12	WG	Leeds Rhinos
Paul Sykes	1	0	CE	Bradford Bulls
Paul Wellens	4	0	FB	St. Helens
Ben Westwood	1	0	SR	Warrington Wolves
Jon Wilkin	3	0	SR	St. Helens

=== New Zealand ===
Head coach: Stephen Kearney (New Zealand)
Assistant coach: Wayne Bennett (Australia)

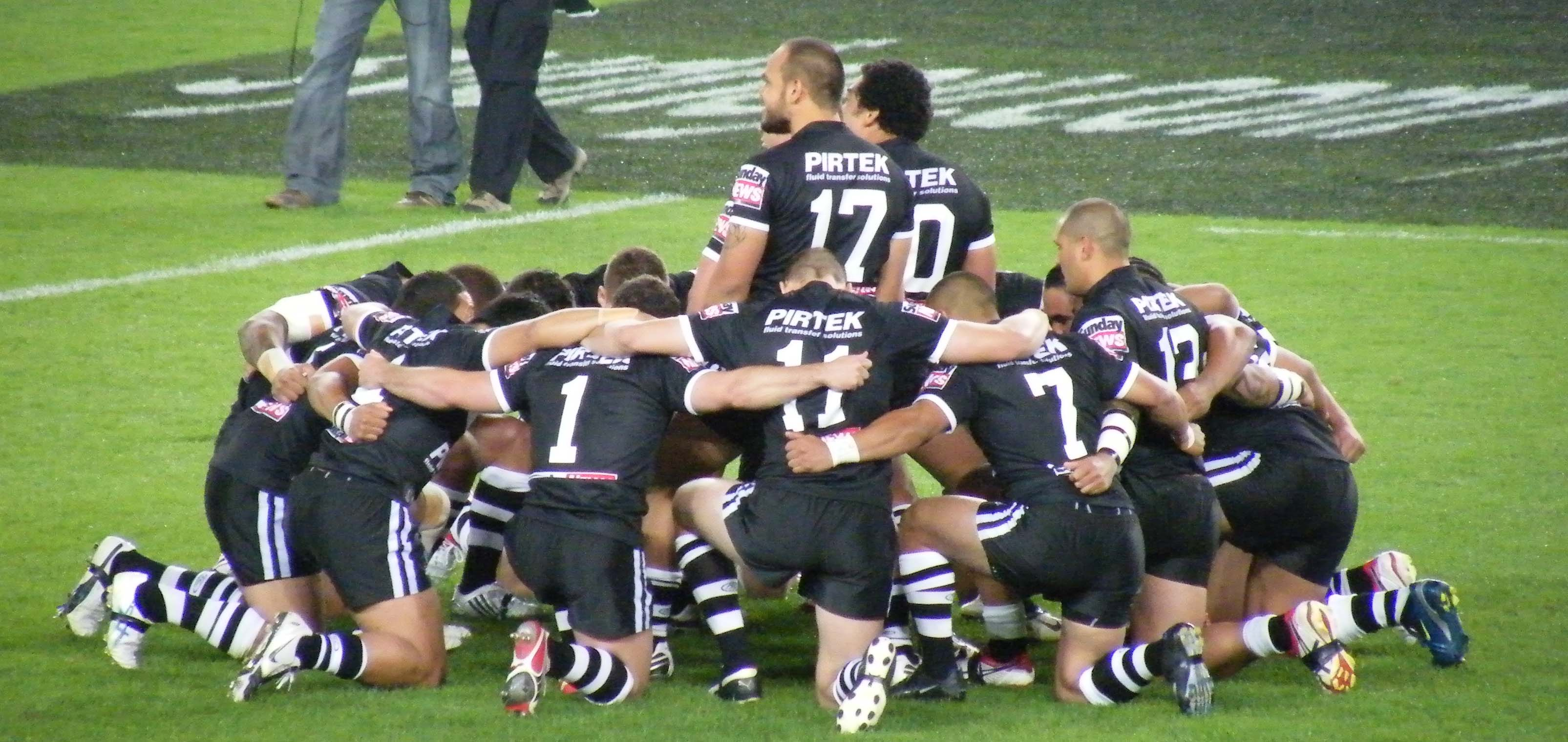

Player	Games	Points	Position	Club
Nathan Cayless (capt)	4	0	PR	Parramatta Eels
Adam Blair	5	8	PR	Melbourne Storm
Greg Eastwood	5	4	LK	Brisbane Broncos
David Fa'alogo	4	4	SR	South Sydney Rabbitohs
Nathan Fien	5	4	UH	New Zealand Warriors
Dene Halatau	1	0	HK	Wests Tigers
Bronson Harrison^{1}	3	4	SR	Wests Tigers
Lance Hohaia	5	16	UH	New Zealand Warriors
Krisnan Inu	1	10	UB	Parramatta Eels
David Kidwell	1	0	SR	South Sydney Rabbitohs
Thomas Leuluai	5	0	HB	Wigan Warriors
Issac Luke	4	16	HK	South Sydney Rabbitohs
Simon Mannering	5	8	SR	New Zealand Warriors
Sika Manu	4	4	PR	Melbourne Storm
Benji Marshall	5	14	FE	Wests Tigers
Steve Matai	2	2	CE	Manly Sea Eagles
Jason Nightingale^{2}	1	4	WG	St. George Illawarra Dragons
Sam Perrett	4	12	UB	Sydney Roosters
Sam Rapira	4	0	PR	New Zealand Warriors
Jerome Ropati	5	16	CE	New Zealand Warriors
Setaimata Sa	1	0	CE	Sydney Roosters
Jeremy Smith	5	12	SR	Melbourne Storm
Evarn Tuimavave^{2}	1	0	PR	New Zealand Warriors
Manu Vatuvei	5	16	WG	New Zealand Warriors

^{1} Replaced originally named Iosia Soliola who withdrew due to injury on 21 October.

^{2} Replaced originally named Brent Webb and Jeff Lima who withdrew due to injury on 7 October.

=== Papua New Guinea ===
Head coach: Adrian Lam (Papua New Guinea)

Player	Games	Points	Position	Club
John Wilshire (capt)	3	10	UB	Salford City Reds
David Moore	3	0	WG	Gold Coast Titans
George Keppa	2	8	WG	Norths Devils
Stanley Gene	3	0	LK	Hull Kingston Rovers
Keith Peters	3	0	HB	Penrith Panthers
Charlie Wabo	2	0	PR	(Papua New Guinea) MMabey & Johnson Muruks
Rodney Pora	1	0	PR	(Papua New Guinea) Mabey & Johnson Muruks
George Moni	2	0	SR	(Papua New Guinea) MMabey & Johnson Muruks
Nickson Kolo	1	0	CE	(Papua New Guinea) Masta Mark City Rangers
Paul Aiton	3	4	HK	Penrith Panthers
Jessie Joe Parker	3	0	FE	(Papua New Guinea) Masta Mark City Rangers
Makali Aizue	2	0	PR	Hull Kingston Rovers
Trevor Exton	3	0	SR	Ipswich Jets
Neville Costigan	3	0	SR	Canberra Raiders
James Nightingale	3	0	LK	Penrith Panthers
Rod Griffin	3	4	LK	Northern Pride
Larsen Marabe	0	0	FB	(Papua New Guinea) Agmark Gurias
Kevin Prior	1	0	CE	Wentworthville Magpies
Jay Aston	1	0	SR	Melbourne Storm
Tu'u Maori	3	0	WG	Sydney Roosters
Menzie Yere	1	4	FE	(Papua New Guinea) Agmark Gurias
Jason Chan	3	4	CE	Windsor Wolves
Nico Slain	1	0	HK	(Papua New Guinea) Bintangor Lahanis
Anton Kui	1	0	HB	(Papua New Guinea) Bingtangor Lahanis

== Pool B ==
=== Fiji ===
Head coach: Joe Dakuitoga (Fiji)

Player	Games	Points	Position	Club
Wes Naiqama (capt)	4	32	WG	Newcastle Knights
Nick Bradley-Qalilawa	4	0	WG	Manly-Warringah Sea Eagles
Jayson Bukuya	4	8	CE	Cronulla-Sutherland Sharks
Iowane Divavesi	2	4	PR	Terrigal Sharks
Aaron Groom	4	0	HB	Bulldogs RLFC
Jarryd Hayne	4	12	FB/WG/FE	Parramatta Eels
Sevania Koroi	4	0	CE/LK	Western Suburbs Magpies
Josua Koroibulu	0	0		(Australia) Milton-Ulladulla Bulldogs
Jone Macilai	1	0	CE/FB/WG	Fassifern RLFC
Daryl Millard	3	0	CE	Bulldogs RLFC
Vula Louis Dakuitoga Naqau	0	0		Terrigal Sharks
Kaliova Nauqe	2	0		Fassifern RLFC
Alipate Noilea	3	0	FE	Parkes Spacemen
Josateki Ravueta				Sawtell Panthers
Osea Sadrau	4	0	PR	Fassifern RLFC
Ashton Sims	4	0	PR	Brisbane Broncos
James Storer	3	0		Cronulla-Sutherland Sharks
Nemani Suguturaga	0	0		Nabua Broncos
Waisale Sukanaveita	4	0	HK	Terrigal Sharks
Semi Tadulala	4	8	WG	Bradford Bulls
Semisi Tora	4	4	LK	Parkes Spacemen
Malakai Yalimaiwai Tuiloa				(Australia) Milton-Ulladulla Bulldogs
Akuila Uate	4	20	WG	Newcastle Knights
Ilisoni Vonomateiratu	4	0	PR	Lautoka Crushers
Jone Wesele	2	0		(Australia) Darlington Point

=== France ===
Head coach: John Monie (Australia)

Player	Games	Points	Position	Club
Jérôme Guisset (capt)	3	12	PR	Catalans Dragons
Éric Anselme	2	0	CE	Leeds Rhinos
Jean-Philippe Baile	1	0	CE	Catalans Dragons
Jean-Christophe Borlin	1	0	FR	Saint-Gaudens Bears
Thomas Bosc	3	16	FE	Catalans Dragons
Laurent Carrasco	2	0	LK	Villeneuve Leopards
Rémi Casty	2	0	PR	Catalans Dragons
Olivier Elima	3	0	SR	Catalans Dragons
Jamal Fakir	3	0	SR	Catalans Dragons
Adel Fellous	2	0	PR	Lézignan Sangliers
Maxime Grésèque	2	0	HB	Pia Donkeys
Mathieu Griffi	1	0	FR	Catalans Dragons
Christophe Moly	3	4	UH/UB	AS Carcassonne
Grégory Mounis	3	0	LK	Catalans Dragons
Justin Murphy	2	0	WG	Catalans Dragons
Dimitri Pelo	2	0	WG	Catalans Dragons
Sébastien Planas	1	4	WG	Toulouse Olympique
Sébastien Raguin	3	4	SR	Catalans Dragons
Julien Rinaldi	1	0	HB	Harlequins RL
Teddy Sadaoui	3	0	CE	AS Carcassonne
Jared Taylor	3	4	FB	Lézignan Sangliers
John Wilson	3	8	CE	Catalans Dragons
James Wynne	2	0	HB	Lézignan Sangliers

=== Scotland ===
Except for Edinburgh Eagles stand-off Paddy Couper, all of the Scottish team's players were selected under the grandparent rule.

Head coach: Steve McCormack (England)

Player	Games	Points	Position	Club
Danny Brough (capt)	2	12	HB	Wakefield Trinity Wildcats
Chris Armit	3	0	PR	Bulldogs RLFC
Dean Colton	1	4	WG	Doncaster
Paddy Coupar	1	0	HB/CE	Edinburgh Eagles
Gavin Cowan	2	0	CE	Easts Tigers
John Duffy	3	0	HB	Widnes Vikings
Ben Fisher	2	0	HK	Hull Kingston Rovers
Andrew Henderson	3	0	HK	Castleford Tigers
Ian Henderson	3	0	HK	New Zealand Warriors
Kevin Henderson	3	0	CE	Wakefield Trinity Wildcats
Jack Howieson	1	0	PR	Sheffield Eagles
Paul Jackson	2	0	PR	Huddersfield Giants
Wade Liddell	2	0	FB	Easts Tigers
Scott Logan	3	0	PR	Canberra Raiders
Neil Lowe	1	0	SR	Keighley Cougars
Dave McConnell	1	0	HK	Leigh Centurions
Duncan MacGillivray	2	0	SR	Wakefield Trinity Wildcats
Iain Morrison	3	0	SR	Widnes Vikings
Gareth Morton	1	0	CE	Oldham
Mick Nanyn	3	0	CE	Oldham
Lee Paterson	1	0	FE	Widnes Vikings
Michael Robertson	3	4	WG	Manly-Warringah Sea Eagles
Jon Steel	2	8	WG	Hull Kingston Rovers
Oliver Wilkes	3	8	PR	Wakefield Trinity Wildcats

== Pool C ==
=== Ireland ===
Head coach: Andy Kelly (England)

Player	Games	Points	Position	Club
Scott Grix (capt)	3	4	FB	Wakefield Trinity Wildcats
Ross Barbour	0	0	CE	(Ireland) Carlow Crusaders
Bob Beswick	3	0	LK	Halifax
Damien Blanch	3	20	WG	Wakefield Trinity Wildcats
Mick Cassidy	1	0	SR	Barrow Raiders
Ged Corcoran	1	0	PR	Sheffield Eagles
Lee Doran	3	0	SR	Widnes Vikings
Liam Finn	3	4	HB	Dewsbury Rams
Simon Finnigan	3	4	SR	Huddersfield Giants
Karl Fitzpatrick	3	0	FB	Salford City Reds
Stevie Gibbons	0	0	WG	London Skolars
Sean Gleeson	3	4	CE	Wakefield Trinity Wildcats
Brendan Guilfoyle	0	0	PR	(Ireland) Treaty City Titans
Gareth Haggerty	3	0	PR	Harlequins RL
Ben Harrison	3	0	PR	Warrington Wolves
Graham Holroyd	0	0	FE	Halifax
Wayne Kerr	1	0	PR	London Skolars
Stuart Littler	3	0	CE	Salford City Reds
Michael McIlorum	3	0	HK	Wigan Warriors
Shayne McMenemy	0	0	SR	WA Reds
Eamon O'Carroll	3	0	PR	Wigan Warriors
Michael Platt	3	4	FB	Bradford Bulls
Pat Richards	3	28	WG	Wigan Warriors
Ryan Tandy	3	0	PR	Wests Tigers

- Brett White was originally named but withdrew due to injury on 9 October. He was replaced by Brendan Guilfoyle.
- Shannon McDonnell has also withdrawn due to injury. He was replaced by Shayne McMenemy.

=== Samoa ===
Head coach: John Ackland (New Zealand)

Player	Games	Points	Position	Club
Nigel Vagana (capt)	2	8	CE	South Sydney Rabbitohs
George Carmont	3	8	WG/CE	Wigan Warriors
David Faiumu	0	0	HK	North Queensland Cowboys
Harrison Hansen	3	0	SR	Wigan Warriors
Ali Lauitiiti	3	0	SR	Leeds Rhinos
Tuaalagi Lepupa	0	0		Marist Saints
Kylie Leuluai	2	0	PR	Leeds Rhinos
Wayne McDade	2	0	PR	Auckland Vulcans
Francis Meli	3	8	WG	St Helens R.F.C.
Joseph Paulo	3	4	SR/FE	Penrith Panthers
Frank Puletua	3	4	PR	Penrith Panthers
Tony Puletua	3	0	SR	Penrith Panthers
Ben Roberts	3	18	HB/FE	Bulldogs RLFC
Tangi Ropati	1	0	FB	Easts Tigers
Smith Samau	3	0	WG	Gold Coast Titans
Lagi Setu	2	0	SR	St. George Illawarra Dragons
Terrence Seu Seu	3	0	HK	Cronulla-Sutherland Sharks
David Solomona	2	4	SR	Bradford Bulls
Willie Talau	2	0	CE	St Helens R.F.C.
Alby Talipeau	2	0	HB	Souths Logan Magpies
Misi Taulapapa	2	8	WG	Cronulla-Sutherland Sharks
Ben Te'o	1	8	SR	Wests Tigers
Tupu Ulufale	0	0		Marist Saints
Matt Utai	3	8	WG	Bulldogs RLFC

=== Tonga ===
Head coach: Jim Dymock (Australia)

Player	Games	Points	Position	Club
Lopini Paea (capt)	3	0	PR	Sydney Roosters
Andrew Emelio	1	0	CE	Bulldogs RLFC
Richard Fa'aoso	2	0	SR	Newcastle Knights
Awen Guttenbeil	1	0	SR	Castleford Tigers
Michael Jennings	3	12	CE	Penrith Panthers
Antonio Kaufusi	3	0	SR	Melbourne Storm
Toshio Laiseni	1	0	FB	Newtown Jets
Stephen Latu	100	3,015	WG	Parramatta Eels
Epalahame Lauaki	3	0	SR	New Zealand Warriors
Tevita Leo-Latu	3	4	HK	Wakefield Trinity Wildcats
Willie Manu	3	0	SR	Hull F.C.
Manase Manuokafoa	2	0	SR	South Sydney Rabbitohs
Feleti Mateo	3	4	SR	Parramatta Eels
Sam Moa	3	0	PR	Cronulla-Sutherland Sharks
Eddie Paea	2	6	HB	South Sydney Rabbitohs
Mickey Paea	1	0	SR	Sydney Roosters
Fetuli Talanoa	3	4	WG	South Sydney Rabbitohs
Joel Taufa'ao	1	4	HB	South Sydney Rabbitohs
Esikeli Tonga	2	4	FB	Gold Coast Titans
Etuate Uaisele	3	8	WG	Parramatta Eels
Kim Uasi	2	0	HK	Auckland Vulcans
Cooper Vuna	3	12	WG	Newcastle Knights
Tony Williams	3	24	WG	Parramatta Eels

- Fuifui Moimoi and Taniela Tuiaki were originally named for Tonga but were ruled ineligible by the Rugby League International Federation after both switched from Tonga to New Zealand in 2007. A New South Wales court later ruled that they could join the team after 12 November, making them available if Tonga made the Semi-finals.
- Fraser and Louis Anderson both were originally named but withdrew due to injury. They were replaced by Kim Usai and Sam Moa.
- Anthony Tupou was originally named but withdrew on 9 October after being called into the Australian squad.

== Welcome to Country ==
As part of the official opening of the World Cup on 26 October, an exhibition game was played between an Aboriginal selection and a New Zealand Māori side.

=== Indigenous Dreamtime Team ===
Head coach: Neil Henry (Australia)

Player	Games	Points	Position	Club
Rhys Wesser	1	8	FB	Penrith Panthers
Justin Carney	1	4	WG	Canberra Raiders
Maurice Blair	1	0	CE	Penrith Panthers
Jamal Idris	1	0	CE	Bulldogs RLFC
Ty Williams	1	0	WG	North Queensland Cowboys
Jamie Soward	1	10	FE	St George Illawarra Dragons
Preston Campbell (capt)	1	0	HB	Gold Coast Titans
Carl Webb	1	0	PR	North Queensland Cowboys
Ian Lacey	1	0	HK	Ipswich Jets
George Rose	1	0	PR	Manly-Warringah Sea Eagles
Daine Laurie	1	0	SR	Wests Tigers
Derrick Watkins	1	0	SR	Brisbane Broncos
Dean Widders	1	0	LK	South Sydney Rabbitohs
Chris Sandow	1	0	HB	South Sydney Rabbitohs
Rod Jensen	1	8	UB	Huddersfield Giants
Yileen Gordon	1	4	CE	South Sydney Rabbitohs
Peter Jensen	1	0	UB	CRL
Denis Moran	0	0	HB	Narwan Eels

=== New Zealand Māori ===
Head coach: Luke Goodwin (New Zealand)

Player	Games	Points	Position	Club
Bronx Goodwin	1	4	FB, WG	Canberra Raiders
Jordan Rapana	1	4	WG	Gold Coast Titans
Chase Stanley	1	6	CE	St George Illawarra Dragons
Karl Johnson	1	0	CE	Central Comets
Shaun Kenny-Dowall	1	4	WG, CE	Sydney Roosters
Arana Taumata	1	4	FE	Bulldogs RLFC
Rangi Chase	1	0	HB, FE	St George Illawarra Dragons
Weller Hauraki	1	0	PR	Parramatta Eels
Ben Ellis (capt)	1	0	HK	St George Illawarra Dragons
Sam McKendry	1	4	FR	Penrith Panthers
Wairangi Koopu	1	0	S1	New Zealand Warriors
Craig Smith	1	0	S2	Unattached
Lee Te Maari	1	0	LF, S1	Bulldogs RLFC
Charlie Herekotukutuku	1	0	FB, WG, HB	South Sydney Rabbitohs
Joseph Cahill	1	0		Sydney Roosters
Chance Bunce	1	0		Cronulla Sharks
James Tamou	1	0	HK	Sydney Roosters
Kevin Proctor	0	0	SR	Melbourne Storm

== Notes and references ==
=== Positions ===
Northern Hemisphere terms
- FB – Fullback
- WG – Wing
- CE – Centre
- SO – Stand-off
- SH – Scrum-half
- PR – Prop
- HK – Hooker
- SR – Second-Row
- LF – Loose-forward
- UB – Utility Back
- N/A
Southern Hemisphere terms
- FB – Fullback
- WG – Wing
- CE – Centre
- FE – Five-Eighth
- HB – Halfback
- PR – Prop
- HK – Hooker
- SR – Second-Row
- LK – Lock
- UB – Utility Back
- UH – Utility Half
