= 2006 Whitehaven R.L.F.C. season =

- National League One Rank: 4th
- Play-off result: Final Eliminator
- Challenge Cup: Round Five
- Northern Rail Cup: Quarter Finalists
- 2006 record: Wins: 12; draws: 1; losses: 5

Team information
- Coach: Dave Rotherham
- Stadium: Recreation Ground
- Avg. attendance: 1,961 (Excluding Challenge Cup)
- High attendance: 4,010 (vs. Workington, 12 February)
- Low attendance: 1,200 (vs. Batley, 9 April)
← 2005 Whitehaven RLFC Season	List of seasons	2007 Whitehaven RLFC season →

Whitehaven once again competed in the National League One in the 2006 season after falling to defeat against Castleford Tigers in the 2005 grand final for a second successive year. They were led by new coach Dave Rotheram who replaced the outgoing Steve McCormack, after he took up the head coaching role at newly relegated Widnes Vikings. Throughout much of the season, the club struggled with injuries which hindered their attempts to reach a third consecutive final and finally secure promotion. At one point, 15-first team players were unavailable for selection. Nevertheless, they mounted a late challenge, led by new-scrum half John Duffy and supported by Steve Trindall and Gary Broadbent before ultimately falling short.

== Squad ==
Player	D.O.B.	Appearances	Tries	Goals	F Goals	Points
Marc Bainbridge	22/12/87	2	0	0	0	0
Daniel Barker	1/12/88	3	0	0	0	0
Neil Baynes	14/9/77	20	2	0	0	8
Gary Broadbent	31/10/76	28	3	0	0	12
Craig Calvert	10/2/84	28	25	0	0	100
Craig Chambers	25/4/73	11	2	0	0	8
Mark Deans	11/5/82	6	1	0	0	4
John Duffy	2/7/80	28	11	13	0	70
Derry Eilbeck	1/6/84	22	9	0	0	36
Scott Farmer	13/1/85	3	0	0	0	0
David Fatialofa	11/6/74	14	0	0	0	0
Howard Hill	16/1/75	31	5	0	0	20
Marc Jackson	21/8/79	22	5	3	0	26
Rob Jackson	4/9/81	24	14	0	0	56
Leroy Joe	31/12/74	32	10	0	0	40
Mark Leafa	4/12/80	16	3	0	0	12
John Lebbon	30/12/84	5	3	0	0	12
Aaron Lester	16/5/73	9	2	0	0	8
Steve Maden	13/9/82	30	16	0	0	64
Graeme Mattinson	24/4/85	13	1	0	0	4
Scott McAvoy	9/4/86	17	3	0	0	12
Chris McKinney	12/11/76	12	0	0	0	0
Spencer Miller	27/2/80	8	6	0	0	24
Paul O'Neil	23/11/79	3	0	0	0	0
Carl Rudd	10/10/82	28	5	120	0	260
David Seeds	23/6/74	26	15	0	0	60
Carl Sice	13/4/80	23	19	1	0	78
Aaron Smith	10/9/82	15	2	0	0	8
Daniel Smith	29/11/87	4	1	0	0	4
Scott Teare	22/12/78	8	1	0	0	4
Steve Trindall	23/4/73	32	3	0	0	12
Craig Walsh	19/9/78	4	1	0	0	4
Oliver Wilkes	2/5/80	6	2	0	0	8
Ricky Wright	15/3/77	11	0	0	0	0

== League results ==
LEGEND
Win
Draw
Loss

Date	Vrs	H/A	Result	Score	Tries	Goals	Field goals	Att	Lineup	Subs	
9/4/06	Batley	H	W	26-8	R. Jackson (7), Chambers (32,46), Sice (72,77)	Rudd 3/7	N/A	1,200	Steve Maden, Derry Eilbeck, David Seeds, Rob Jackson, Craig Calvert, Leroy Joe, John Duffy, Neil Baynes, Carl Sice, Steve Trindall, Scott McAvoy, Howard Hill, Carl Rudd	Mark Deans, Craig Chambers, Marc Jackson, Graeme Mattinson	-
14/4/06	Doncaster Lakers	A	D	32-32	Maden (10), Calvert (34), Duffy (43), M. Jackson (57), Seeds (65)	Rudd 4/4, M. Jackson 2/2	N/A	817	Steve Maden, Craig Calvert, David Seeds, Rob Jackson, Derry Eilbeck, Leroy Joe, John Duffy, Marc Jackson, Carl Sice, Steve Trindall, Scott McAvoy, Howard Hill, Carl Rudd	Graeme Mattinson, Chris McKinney, Craig Chambers, Neil Baynes	-
17/4/06	Rochdale	H	W	38-24	Sice (13), Maden (18,69), Eilbeck (30), Hill (32), Rudd (63)	Rudd 7/8	N/A	2.057	Gary Broadbent, Derry Eilbeck, David Seeds, Rob Jackson, Steve Maden, Leroy Joe, John Duffy, Chris McKinney, Carl Sice, Steve Trindall, Scott McAvoy, Howard Hill, Carl Rudd	Craig Calvert, Marc Jackson, Craig Chambers, Neil Baynes	-
30/4/06	Widnes	H	L	16-38	Calvert (48), Duffy (51), Joe (70)	Rudd 2/3, Seeds 0/1	N/A	3,048	Gary Broadbent, Craig Calvert, David Seeds, Rob Jackson, Derry Eilbeck, Carl Rudd, Leroy Joe, Neil Baynes, John Duffy, Chris McKinney, Ricky Wright, Howard Hill, Steve Trindall	Carl Sice, Scott Farmer, Craig Walsh, Craig Chambers	-
14/5/06	Oldham	A	W	10-48	Teare (27), Sice (30,69,76), McAvoy (40), Walsh (45), Eilbeck (60), Joe (64)	Rudd 8/9	N/A	813	Gary Broadbent, Craig Calvert, David Seeds, Rob Jackson, Steve Maden, Leroy Joe, John Duffy, Neil Baynes, Carl Sice, Steve Trindall, Ricky Wright, Howard Hill, Carl Rudd	Derry Eilbeck, Scott McAvoy, Craig Walsh, Scott Teare	-
28/5/06	Halifax	H	W	30-20	Duffy (12), Sice (20,41), Hill (78), Calvert (80)	Duffy 5/5	N/A	2,048	Gary Broadbent, Craig Calvert, Derry Eilbeck, Rob Jackson, Steve Maden, Leroy Joe, John Duffy, Neil Baynes, Carl Sice, Steve Trindall, Scott McAvoy, Howard Hill, Mark Leafa	Marc Jackson, Aaron Smith, Ricky Wright, Scott Teare	-
4/6/06	Rochdale	A	W	32-6	Maden (48)	M. Jackson 1/1	N/A	449	Gary Broadbent, Craig Calvert, David Seeds, Derry Eilbeck, Steve Maden, Leroy Joe, John Duffy, Howard Hill, Carl Sice, Steve Trindall, Scott McAvoy, Mark Leafa, Aaron Smith	Daniel Barker, Marc Jackson, Chris McKinney, Daniel Smith	-
11/6/06	Hull KR	A	L	74-12	Broadbent (7), Seeds (44)	Rudd 2/2	N/A	3,151	Gary Broadbent, Craig Calvert, David Seeds, Derry Eilbeck, Steve Maden, Leroy Joe, Carl Rudd, Marc Jackson, Aaron Smith, Steve Trindall, Scott McAvoy, Howard Hill, Mark Leafa	Carl Sice, Scott Farmer, Chris McKinney, Scott Teare	-
25/6/06	Leigh	H	W	32-22	Calvert (41,57,60), Duffy (45), Eilbeck (71)	Rudd 4/6	N/A	1,809	Gary Broadbent, Craig Calvert, David Seeds, Derry Eilbeck, Steve Maden, Leroy Joe, John Duffy, Marc Jackson, Aaron Smith, Steve Trindall, Scott McAvoy, Mark Leafa, Carl Rudd	Carl Sice, David Fatialofa, Ricky Wright, Howard Hill	-
2/7/06	Widnes	A	L	26-12	Maden (8), Eilbeck (80)	Rudd 2/2	N/A	3,016	Gary Broadbent, Craig Calvert, Scott McAvoy, Derry Eilbeck, Steve Maden, Leroy Joe, John Duffy, Marc Jackson, Aaron Smith, Steve Trindall, Ricky Wright, Mark Leafa, Carl Rudd	Carl Sice, David Fatialofa, Scott Teare, Howard Hill	-
9/7/06	York	H	W	42-24	Duffy (21), Baynes (34), Calvert (43,65), Joe (46), Broadbent (58), Trindall (62)	Rudd 7/7	N/A	1,608	Gary Broadbent, Steve Maden, Carl Rudd, Derry Eilbeck, Craig Calvert, Leroy Joe, John Duffy, Steve Trindall, Aaron Smith, David Fatialofa, Ricky Wright, Mark Leafa, Aaron Lester	Carl Sice, Scott Teare, Howard Hill, Neil Baynes	-
23/7/06	Leigh	A	W	12-22	Calvert (30), Maden (50), Seeds (62)	Rudd 5/7	N/A	1,920	Gary Broadbent, Craig Calvert, David Seeds, Derry Eilbeck, Steve Maden, Leroy Joe, John Duffy, Steve Trindall, Aaron Smith, David Fatialofa, Rob Jackson, Mark Leafa, Carl Rudd	Carl Sice, Aaron Lester, Howard Hill, Neil Baynes	-
30/7/06	Batley	A	W	12-20	Lester (37), Seeds (42), Maden (62)	Rudd 4/5	N/A	858	Gary Broadbent, Craig Calvert, David Seeds, Derry Eilbeck, Steve Maden, Leroy Joe, Carl Rudd, Steve Trindall, Aaron Smith, David Fatialofa, Mark Leafa, Rob Jackson, Aaron Lester	Carl Sice, Howard Hill, Ricky Wright, Neil Baynes	-
6/8/06	Doncaster Lakers	H	W	22-12	Trindall (9), Calvert (39,54)	Rudd 5/5	N/A	1,829	Gary Broadbent, Craig Calvert, David Seeds, Rob Jackson, Steve Maden, Leroy Joe, John Duffy, Steve Trindall, Aaron Smith, David Fatialofa, Aaron Lester, Mark Leafa, Carl Rudd	Graeme Mattinson, Ricky Wright, Howard Hill, Neil Baynes	-
13/8/06	York	A	L	28-18	Duffy (10), Lester (47), Eilbeck (50)	Rudd 3/3	N/A	1,210	Gary Broadbent, Craig Calvert, David Seeds, Derry Eilbeck, Steve Maden, Leroy Joe, John Duffy, Steve Trindall, Aaron Smith, David Fatialofa, Aaron Lester, Mark Leafa, Carl Rudd	Graeme Mattinson, Spencer Miller, Howard Hill, Neil Baynes	-
20/8/06	Hull KR	H	W	48-12	Lebbon (6,76), Rudd (9), Maden (23,32), Joe (40), Mattinson (42), Hill (49), Miller (59)	Rudd 6/7, Duffy 0/1, Seeds 0/1	N/A	2,063	Gary Broadbent, John Lebbon, David Seeds, Derry Eilbeck, Steve Maden, John Duffy, Leroy Joe, Steve Trindall, Aaron Smith, David Fatialofa, Spencer Miller, Mark Leafa, Carl Rudd	Graeme Mattinson, Howard Hill, Ricky Wright, Scott Teare	-
3/9/06	Halifax	A	W	18-26	Joe (37), Hill (40), R. Jackson (54), Maden (59), Eilbeck (75)	Duffy 3/5	N/A	2,247	Gary Broadbent, John Lebbon, Rob Jackson, Derry Eilbeck, Steve Maden, Leroy Joe, John Duffy, Steve Trindall, Aaron Smith, David Fatialofa, Spencer Miller, Mark Leafa, Carl Rudd	Graeme Mattinson, Ricky Wright, Howard Hill, Scott Teare	-
10/9/06	Oldham	H	W	66-4	R. Jackson (2,4), A. Smith (20), Calvert (22,35), Eilbeck (38), Joe (41), Duffy (56,69), Baynes (63), Miller (75), Leafa (80)	Rudd 9/12	N/A	1,764	Gary Broadbent, Craig Calvert, Rob Jackson, Derry Eilbeck, Steve Maden, Leroy Joe, John Duffy, Steve Trindall, Aaron Smith, David Fatialofa, Spencer Miller, Mark Leafa, Carl Rudd	Graeme Mattinson, Marc Jackson, Howard Hill, Neil Baynes	-

Playoffs

Date	Rd	Vrs	H/A	Result	Score	Tries	Goals	Field goals	Att	Lineup	Subs	
17/9/06	Elimination Play-Off	Rochdale	H	W	38-10	A. Smith (1), Miller (7), Calvert (9), Duffy (12), Seeds (15), R. Jackson (46,56,63)	Rudd 3/8	N/A	1,461	Gary Broadbent, Craig Calvert, David Seeds, Rob Jackson, Steve Maden, Leroy Joe, John Duffy, Steve Trindall, Aaron Smith, David Fatialofa, Spencer Miller, Mark Leafa, Carl Rudd	Graeme Mattinson, Marc Jackson, Howard Hill, Aaron Lester	-
24/9/06	Elimination Semi-Final	Batley	H	W	30-0	Duffy (6), Leafa (16,79), Miller (58), Calvert (71)	Rudd 5/6	N/A	1,906	Gary Broadbent, Craig Calvert, David Seeds, Rob Jackson, Steve Maden, Leroy Joe, John Duffy, Steve Trindall, Aaron Smith, David Fatialofa, Spencer Miller, Mark Leafa, Carl Rudd	Graeme Mattinson, Marc Jackson, Howard Hill, Aaron Lester	-
1/10/06	Final Eliminator	Widnes	A	L	24-20	Miller (3,76), Joe (44), Seeds (67)	Rudd 2/5	N/A	4,808	Gary Broadbent, Steve Maden, Rob Jackson, David Seeds, Craig Calvert, Leroy Joe, John Duffy, Steve Trindall, Aaron Lester, David Fatialofa, Spencer Miller, Mark Leafa, Carl Rudd	Graeme Mattinson, Marc Jackson, Howard Hill, Scott McAvoy	

Northern Rail Cup

Date	Rd	Vrs	H/A	Result	Score	Tries	Goals	Field goals	Att	Lineup	Subs	
12/2/06	Group 2	Workington	H	W	10-0	Calvert (34), Broadbent (59)	Duffy 1/2	N/A	4,010	Gary Broadbent, Craig Calvert, David Seeds, Derry Eilbeck, Steve Maden, Leroy Joe, John Duffy, Steve Trindall, Aaron Lester, David Fatialofa, Oliver Wilkes, Howard Hill, Spencer Miller	Rob Jackson, Graeme Mattinson, Marc Jackson, Neil Baynes	-
19/2/06	Group 2	Barrow	A	W	20-36	Wilkes (12), Trindall (20), Sice (42,44), Calvert (50,71,75)	Duffy 4/6, Seeds 0/1	N/A	1,686	Gary Broadbent, Craig Calvert, David Seeds, Daniel Smith, Steve Maden, Leroy Joe, John Duffy, Neil Baynes, Graeme Mattinson, Steve Trindall, Oliver Wilkes, Howard Hill, Rob Jackson	Carl Sice, Scott McAvoy, Marc Jackson, Mark Deans	-
26/2/06	Group 2	Gateshead	H	W	36-12	Maden (5,65), R. Jackson (13), Sice (17), Calvert (30), Seeds (55), M. Jackson (62)	Rudd 4/7	N/A	1,306	Gary Broadbent, Craig Calvert, David Seeds, Rob Jackson, Steve Maden, Leroy Joe, John Duffy, Steve Trindall, Carl Sice, Mark Deans, Oliver Wilkes, Howard Hill, Carl Rudd	Paul O'Neill, Marc Jackson, Craig Chambers, Chris McKinney	-
5/3/06	Group 2	Barrow	H	W	26-18	R. Jackson (12), Joe (16), Hill (31), Lebbon (61), Seeds (72)	Rudd 3/5	N/A	1,863	Gary Broadbent, John Lebbon, David Seeds, Rob Jackson, Steve Maden, Leroy Joe, Carl Rudd, Steve Trindall, Carl Sice, Craig Chambers, Oliver Wilkes, Scott McAvoy, Howard Hill	Marc Bainbridge, Mark Deans, Marc Jackson, Chris McKinney	-
19/3/06	Group 2	Workington	A	W	0-48	Joe (4), Rudd (9), Duffy (14), M. Jackson (24,69), Sice (32,57), Wilkes (66)	Rudd 8/8	N/A	2,576	Gary Broadbent, Craig Calvert, David Seeds, Scott McAvoy, Steve Maden, Leroy Joe, John Duffy, Craig Chambers, Carl Sice, Steve Trindall, Oliver Wilkes, Howard Hill, Carl Rudd	Paul O'Neil, Marc Jackson, Chris McKinney, Neil Baynes	-
29/3/06	Group 2	Gateshead	A	W	20-44	Rudd (22), Sice (36,66), R. Jackson (47,70), McAvoy (51), Deans (55), D. Smith (72)	Rudd 6/8	N/A	408	Paul O'Neil, Craig Calvert, David Seeds, Rob Jackson, Daniel Smith, Leroy Joe, Marc Bainbridge, Neil Baynes, Carl Sice, Steve Trindall, Scott McAvoy, Craig Walsh, Carl Rudd	Daniel Barker, Mark Deans, Chris McKinney, Marc Jackson	-
23/4/06	QF Qualifying Round	Sheffield	H	W	38-30	Maden (8), Calvert (9,61), Seeds (16,26), Eilbeck (29), Sice (53)	Rudd 5/7	N/A	1,451	Gary Broadbent, Craig Calvert, David Seeds, Derry Eilbeck, Steve Maden, Leroy Joe, John Duffy, Marc Jackson, Carl Sice, Steve Trindall, Howard Hill, Rob Jackson, Carl Rudd	Scott Farmer, Chris McKinney, Craig Chambers, Neil Baynes	-
7/5/06	QF	Hull KR	A	L	37-10	Sice (55), R. Jackson (65)	Rudd 1/2	N/A	2,366	Gary Broadbent, Craig Calvert, David Seeds, Rob Jackson, Steve Maden, Leroy Joe, John Duffy, Neil Baynes, Carl Sice, Steve Trindall, Ricky Wright, Howard Hill, Carl Rudd	Derry Eilbeck, Scott McAvoy, John Lebbon, Scott Teare	-

Playoffs

Date	Rd	Vrs	H/A	Result	Score	Tries	Goals	Field goals	Att	Lineup	Subs	
10/3/06	3	Pia	H	W	72-0	Seeds (3,16,72), R. Jackson (5), Maden (9,36,61), Joe (31), Calvert (43,54,63), M. Jackson (57), Sice (68)	Rudd 9/12, Sice 1/1	N/A	2,300	Gary Broadbent, Craig Calvert, David Seeds, Rob Jackson, Steve Maden, Leroy Joe, John Duffy, Craig Chambers, Carl Sice, Steve Trindall, Oliver Wilkes, Howard Hill, Carl Rudd	Graeme Mattinson, Marc Jackson, Chris McKinney, Neil Baynes	-
2/4/06	4	Batley	A	W	16-28	Seeds (2,69), R. Jackson (19), Sice (33), Eilbeck (50), Rudd (75)	Rudd 2/6	N/A	679	Steve Maden, Daniel Smith, David Seeds, Rob Jackson, Derry Eilbeck, Leroy Joe, John Duffy, Neil Baynes, Carl Sice, Steve Trindall, Scott McAvoy, Howard Hill, Carl Rudd	Mark Deans, Marc Jackson, Chris McKinney, Craig Chambers	-
21/5/06	5	Warrington	A	W	46-2	N/A	Rudd 1/1	N/A	4,751	Gary Broadbent, Craig Calvert, Rob Jackson, Derry Eilbeck, Steve Maden, Leroy Joe, John Duffy, Marc Jackson, Carl Sice, Steve Trindall, Scott McAvoy, Howard Hill, Carl Rudd	Daniel Barker, Craig Chambers, Craig Walsh, John Lebbon	-
