= 2007 Bradford Bulls season =

- Super League XII Rank: 3rd
- Play-off result: Elimination Playoff
- Challenge Cup: Semi-final
- 2007 record: Wins: 20; draws: 1; losses: 11
- Points scored: For: 912; against: 666

Team information
- Chairman: Peter Hood
- Head Coach: Steve McNamara
- Captain: Paul Deacon
- Stadium: Odsal Stadium
- Avg. attendance: 11,476
- High attendance: 18,195 vs. Leeds Rhinos

Top scorers
- Tries: Lesley Vainikolo (19)
- Goals: Paul Deacon (112)
- Points: Paul Deacon (244)
← 2006	List of seasons	2008 →

This article details the Bradford Bulls rugby league football club's 2007 season. This is the 12th season of the Super League era.

== 2007 Milestones ==
- Round 1: Shontayne Hape scored his 75th try and reached 300 points for the Bulls.
- Round 1: Glenn Morrison and David Solomona scored their 1st tries for the Bulls.
- Round 2: Michael Platt and James Evans scored their 1st tries for the Bulls.
- Round 2: Michael Platt scored his 1st hat-trick for the Bulls.
- Round 3: Lesley Vainikolo scored his 11th hat-trick for the Bulls.
- Round 3: Paul Deacon reached 2,000 points for the Bulls.
- Round 5: Michael Platt scored his 2nd hat-trick for the Bulls.
- Round 10: Iestyn Harris reached 200 points for the Bulls.
- Round 10: Dave Halley scored his 1st try for the Bulls.
- Round 11: Paul Deacon kicked his 900th goal for the Bulls.
- Round 12: Paul Deacon reached 2,100 points for the Bulls.
- CCR5: Matt Cook scored his 1st try for the Bulls.
- Round 15: Lesley Vainikolo scored his 12th hat-trick for the Bulls.
- Round 15: Richard Hawkyard scored his 1st try for the Bulls.
- CCQF: Tame Tupou scored his 1st try for the Bulls.
- Round 17: Terry Newton scored his 1st four-try haul and 1st hat-trick for the Bulls.
- Round 17: Lesley Vainikolo kicked his 1st goal for the Bulls.
- Round 19: Paul Deacon reached 2,200 points for the Bulls.
- Round 22: Sam Burgess kicked his 1st goal for the Bulls.
- Round 25: Ben Harris scored his 25th try and reached 100 points for the Bulls.
- EPO: David Solomona scored his 1st hat-trick for the Bulls.

== Table ==
Pos	Team	Pld	W	D	L	PF	PA	PD	Pts	Qualification
1	St Helens (L)	27	19	0	8	783	422	+361	38	Semifinal
2	Leeds Rhinos (C)	27	18	1	8	747	487	+260	37	Semifinal
3	Bradford Bulls	27	17	1	9	778	560	+218	33 (Note: Bradford deducted 2 points for salary cap breaches.)	Elimination semifinal
4	Hull F.C.	27	14	2	11	573	553	+20	30	Elimination semifinal
5	Huddersfield Giants	27	13	1	13	638	543	+95	27	Elimination semifinal
6	Wigan Warriors	27	15	1	11	621	527	+94	27 (Note: Wigan deducted 4 points for salary cap breaches.)	Elimination semifinal
7	Warrington Wolves	27	13	0	14	693	736	−43	26	
8	Wakefield Trinity Wildcats	27	11	1	15	596	714	−118	23	
9	Harlequins	27	10	3	14	495	636	−141	23	
10	Catalans Dragons	27	10	1	16	570	685	−115	21	
11	Hull Kingston Rovers	27	10	0	17	491	723	−232	20	
12	Salford City Reds (R)	27	6	1	20	475	874	−399	13	Relegation to National League One

Source: Rugby League Project
Rules for classification: 1) Points; 2) Points difference; 3) Number of points scored;
(C) Champions; (L) League Leaders' Shield Winners; (R) Relegated

== 2007 Fixtures and results ==
LEGEND
Win
Draw
Loss

2007 Engage Super League

Date	Competition	Rnd	Vrs	H/A	Venue	Result	Score	Tries	Goals	Att
11 February 2007	Super League XII	1	Huddersfield Giants	H	Odsal Stadium	W	18–14	Hape, Morrison, Solomona	Deacon 3/4	12,130
18 February 2007	Super League XII	2	Warrington Wolves	A	Halliwell Jones Stadium	W	36–20	Platt (3), Evans, Morrison, Vainikolo	Deacon 6/7	12,607
24 February 2007	Super League XII	3	Wigan Warriors	H	Odsal Stadium	W	32–28	Vainikolo (3), Morrison, Newton	Deacon 6/6	12,798
2 March 2007	Super League XII	4	St. Helens	A	Knowsley Road	L	22–34	Hape (2), Langley, Solomona	Deacon 3/4	11,793
11 March 2007	Super League XII	5	Salford City Reds	H	Odsal Stadium	W	56–18	Platt (3), Hape (2), McKenna (2), Henderson, Solomona, St Hilaire	Deacon 8/10	10,640
17 March 2007	Super League XII	6	Harlequins RL	A	Twickenham Stoop	W	36–22	Morrison (2), I.Harris, Langley, Platt, Vainikolo	Deacon 6/6	4,011
25 March 2007	Super League XII	7	Catalans Dragons	H	Odsal Stadium	L	22–29	Evans (2), Deacon, Platt	Deacon 3/4	11,298
5 April 2007	Super League XII	8	Leeds Rhinos	H	Odsal Stadium	L	14–18	St Hilaire, Vainikolo	Deacon 3/5	16,706
9 April 2007	Super League XII	9	Wakefield Trinity Wildcats	A	Belle Vue	W	36–24	Vainikolo (2), Henderson, McKenna, Platt, Solomona	Deacon 6/7	9,106
15 April 2007	Super League XII	10	Hull Kingston Rovers	H	Odsal Stadium	W	52–22	I.Harris (2), Lynch (2), Halley, B.Harris, Langley, Platt, Solomona	Deacon 8/9	10,881
20 April 2007	Super League XII	11	Hull F.C.	A	KC Stadium	W	32–22	Evans (2), B.Harris, Lynch, Newton, Vagana	Deacon 4/6	12,767
29 April 2007	Super League XII	12	Warrington Wolves	H	Odsal Stadium	W	36–24	Platt (2), Deacon, Evans, Langley, Vainikolo	Deacon 3/3, I.Harris 3/5	11,276
6 May 2007	Magic Weekend	13	Leeds Rhinos	N	Millennium Stadium	L	38–42	Platt (2), B.Harris, Henderson, Lynch, Vainikolo	Deacon 7/7	26,447
18 May 2007	Super League XII	14	Huddersfield Giants	A	Galpharm Stadium	L	12–36	B.Harris, Vainikolo	I.Harris 2/2	8,667
27 May 2007	Super League XII	15	Harlequins RL	H	Odsal Stadium	W	44–18	Vainikolo (3), Deacon, Hawkyard, Henderson, Morrison, Vagana	Deacon 6/8	10,418
2 June 2007	Super League XII	16	Catalans Dragons	A	Stade Gilbert Brutus	W	28–20	Deacon, Evans, Newton, Vagana, Vainikolo	Deacon 4/6	7,555
17 June 2007	Super League XII	17	Hull F.C.	H	Odsal Stadium	W	34–8	Newton (4), Deacon, Tupou	Deacon 4/5, Vainikolo 1/1	11,557
29 June 2007	Super League XII	18	Leeds Rhinos	A	Headingley Stadium	W	38–14	Evans, Lynch, Morrison, St Hilaire, Tupou, Vainikolo	Deacon 7/7	22,000
6 July 2007	Super League XII	19	Wigan Warriors	A	JJB Stadium	L	18–25	Evans, B.Harris	Deacon 5/5	15,107
13 July 2007	Super League XII	20	St. Helens	H	Odsal Stadium	W	10–4	St Hilaire	Deacon 3/5	11,214
21 July 2007	Super League XII	21	Salford City Reds	A	The Willows	L	10–14	Tupou (2)	Deacon 1/2	3,438
5 August 2007	Super League XII	22	Wakefield Trinity Wildcats	H	Odsal Stadium	W	38–24	Evans (2), Burgess, Halley, Morrison, Solomona, Tupou	Burgess 5/8	10,701
12 August 2007	Super League XII	23	Hull Kingston Rovers	A	Craven Park	W	28–10	Burgess, Henderson, Morrison, Newton, St Hilaire	I.Harris 4/5	6,695
19 August 2007	Super League XII	24	Huddersfield Giants	A	Galpharm Stadium	L	22–26	Henderson, McKenna, Solomona	I.Harris 5/5	6,824
2 September 2007	Super League XII	25	Leeds Rhinos	H	Odsal Stadium	D	16–16	Evans, B.Harris, Lynch	Deacon 2/4	18,195
9 September 2007	Super League XII	26	Catalans Dragons	H	Odsal Stadium	W	40–8	Halley, I.Harris, Morrison, McAvoy, Newton, Solomona, Vagana	I.Harris 6/7	9,350
14 September 2007	Super League XII	27	Hull F.C.	A	KC Stadium	L	10–20	Solomona, Tupou	I.Harris 1/2	14,402

== Challenge Cup ==
LEGEND
Win
Draw
Loss

Date	Competition	Rnd	Vrs	H/A	Venue	Result	Score	Tries	Goals	Att
28 March 2007	Cup	4th	Castleford Tigers	H	Odsal Stadium	W	24–16	Morrison, Solomona, St Hilaire, Vainikolo	Deacon 4/4	6,748
13 May 2007	Cup	5th	Wakefield Trinity Wildcats	A	Belle Vue	W	14–4	Vainikolo (2), Cook	Deacon 1/3	3,700
10 June 2007	Cup	QF	Huddersfield Giants	H	Odsal Stadium	W	52–20	B.Harris (2), Tupou (2), Burgess, Henderson, Newton, Solomona, St Hilaire	Deacon 8/10	7,811
28 July 2007	Cup	SF	St. Helens	H	Galpharm Stadium	L	14–35	Evans, Tupou, Vagana	Deacon 1/3	14,316

== Playoffs ==
LEGEND
Win
Draw
Loss

Date	Competition	Rnd	Vrs	H/A	Venue	Result	Score	Tries	Goals	Att
21 September 2007	Play-offs	EPO	Wigan Warriors	H	Odsal Stadium	L	30–31	Solomona (3), I.Harris, Tupou	I.Harris 5/6	9,055

== 2007 squad statistics ==
- Appearances and Points include (Super League, Challenge Cup and Play-offs) as of 2012.

No	Player	Position	Tries	Goals	DG	Points
1	Marcus St Hilaire	Fullback	7	0	0	28
2	Nathan McAvoy	Wing	1	0	0	4
3	Ben Harris	Centre	8	0	0	32
4	Shontayne Hape	Centre	5	0	0	20
5	Lesley Vainikolo	Wing	19	1	0	78
6	Iestyn Harris	Stand-off	5	26	0	72
7	Paul Deacon	Scrum-half	5	112	0	244
8	Joe Vagana	Prop	5	0	0	20
9	Terry Newton	Hooker	10	0	0	40
10	Andy Lynch	Prop	6	0	0	24
11	Chris McKenna	Second-row	4	0	0	16
12	Glenn Morrison	Second-row	11	0	0	44
13	Jamie Langley	Loose forward	11	0	0	44
14	Chris Feather	Prop	0	0	0	0
15	Matt Cook	Second-row	1	0	0	4
16	Ian Henderson	Hooker	7	0	0	28
17	James Evans	Centre	13	0	0	52
18	Sam Burgess	Loose forward	3	5	0	22
19	Michael Platt	Fullback	14	0	0	56
20	Tame Tupou	Wing	10	0	0	40
22	Craig Kopczak	Prop	0	0	0	0
23	Matt James	Prop	0	0	0	0
24	Dave Halley	Wing	3	0	0	12
25	Jason Crookes	Centre	0	0	0	0
26	David Solomona	Second-row	14	0	0	56
27	Richard Hawkyard	Scrum-half	1	0	0	4
