= Gavin Cowan =

Gavin Cowan may refer to:

- Gavin Cowan (footballer) (born 1981), German-born English footballer
- Gavin Cowan (rugby league) (born 1987), rugby league player
