= Ulufale =

Ulufale is a surname. Notable people with the surname include:

- Mike Ulufale (born 1972), American football player
- Tupu Ulufale (born 1987), Samoan rugby league footballer
