= Norman Harris (rugby) =

Wales international rugby league footballer

Personal information
- Full name: Norman Harris
- Born: c. 1918 Abercarn, Wales
- Died: 2007 (aged c. 88–89) Oldham, England

Playing information

Rugby union
Club
Years	Team	Pld	T	G	FG	P
	Abercarn RFC
	Ebbw Vale RFC
	Pontypool RFC
	Newbridge RFC
	Total	0	0	0	0	0

Rugby league
- Position: Centre
Club
Years	Team	Pld	T	G	FG	P
1946–49	Oldham	119	37	9		119
1949–52	Leigh
1952–54	Rochdale Hornets	57	9			27
	Total	176	46	9	0	146
Representative
Years	Team	Pld	T	G	FG	P
1947–53	Wales	7	3			9
- Relatives: Iestyn Harris (grandson)

Norman Harris (c. 1918 – 2007) was a Welsh rugby union, and professional rugby league footballer who played in the 1940s and 1950s. He played club level rugby union (RU) for Abercarn, Ebbw Vale, Pontypool and Newbridge, and representative level rugby league (RL) for Wales, and at club level for Oldham, Leigh and Rochdale Hornets, as a centre.

== Background ==
Harris was born in Abercarn, Monmouthshire, Wales, and he died aged c. 88–89 in Oldham, Greater Manchester, England.

== Rugby career ==
Harris started his rugby career as a rugby union player in Wales. Born in Abercarn, Harris played for four South Wales clubs Abercarn, Ebbw Vale, Pontypool and Newbridge. In 1946, Harris left behind amateur rugby union by signing for professional rugby league club Oldham. It was while playing for Oldham that Harris was first selected for the Wales national rugby league team, a home match on 12 April 1947 against France. Wales won the match 17–15, and Harris scored his first international points with a try during the game. He was awarded his second cap just seven months later in the next encounter with France, this time played away at Bordeaux; Harris again appeared on the score sheet with his second international try. he played two more internationals while at Oldham, two encounters with England, in December 1947 and February 1949. By the time of his fifth international game for Wales, just two months later, Harris had left Oldham and signed for Leigh.

Harris played for Leigh from 1949 until the end of the 1951–52 season; and was awarded another two caps for Wales during his time at the club, against France and Other Nationalities teams, both in 1949.

Harris played at centre in Leigh's 7–20 defeat by Wigan in the 1949–50 Lancashire Cup Final during the 1949–50 season at Wilderspool Stadium, Warrington on Saturday 29 October 1949, and played at centre, and scored a try in the 6–14 defeat by Wigan in the 1951–52 Lancashire Cup Final during the 1951–52 season at Station Road, Swinton on Saturday 27 October 1951. At the start of the 1952–53 season, Harris joined Leigh becoming the team's player-coach. He made 67 appearances for Leigh and was awarded a final international cap while with the club in 1953. He retired from rugby in October 1954, and died in Oldham, Greater Manchester.

Harris' international career was eclipsed by his grandson, Iestyn Harris, who made 25 rugby union appearances for Wales and 19 rugby league appearances for Wales.

=== International matches ===
Wales

- England 1947, 1949
- France 1947, 1947, 1949
- Other nationalities 1949, 1953
