= Andrew Bentley =

Scotland & France international rugby league footballer

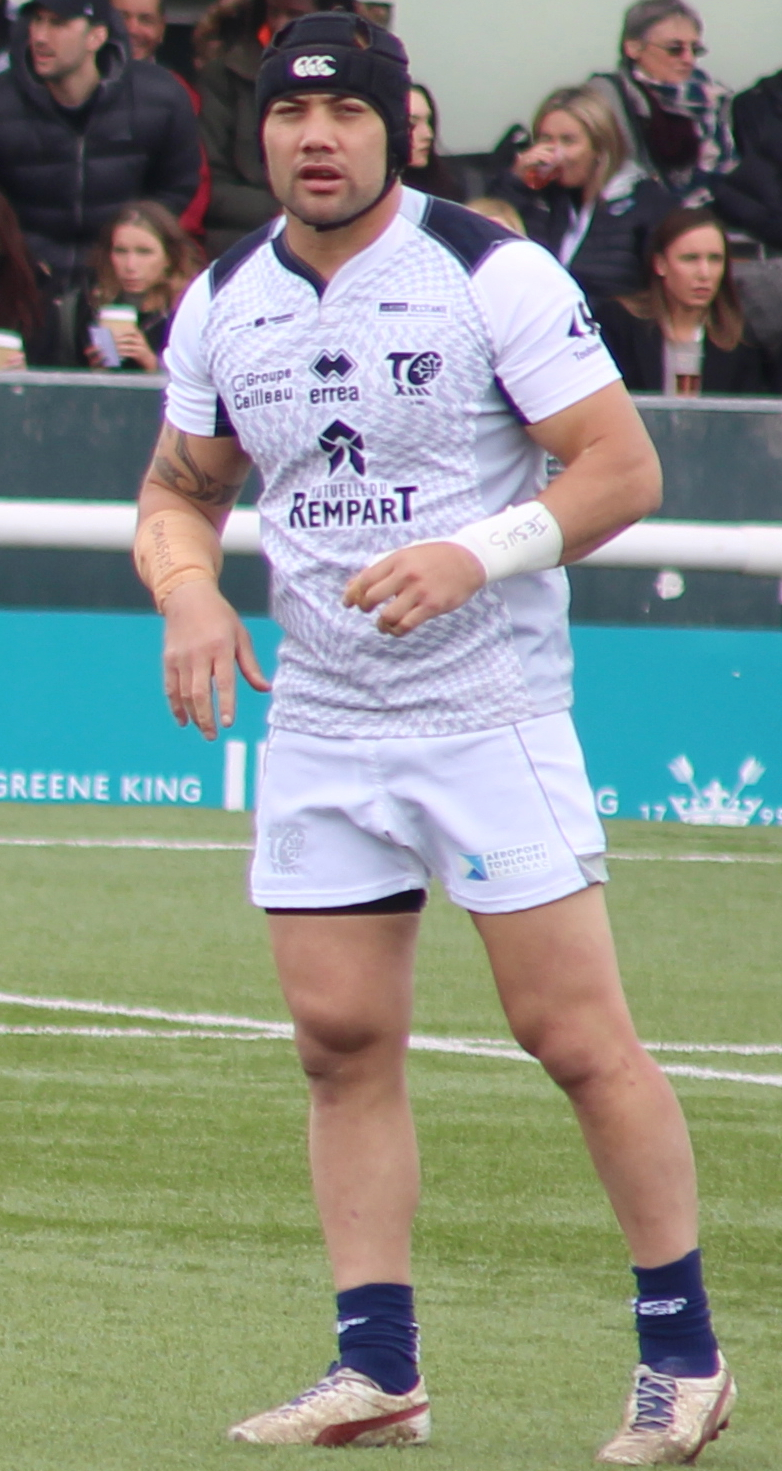

Personal information
- Born: 13 May 1985 (age 41) Auckland, New Zealand
- Height: 5 ft 11 in (181 cm)
- Weight: 231 lb; 16 st 7 lb (105 kg)

Playing information
- Position: Second-row, Loose forward, Hooker
Club
Years	Team	Pld	T	G	FG	P
2007–10	Catalans Dragons	29	3	0	0	12
2010–12	Lézignan Sangliers	20	3	0	0	12
2012–13	Pia	23	3	0	0	12
2013	Oxford	3	0	0	0	0
2013–19	Toulouse Olympique	82	5	0	0	20
	Total	157	14	0	0	56
Representative
Years	Team	Pld	T	G	FG	P
2009–13	France	9	4	0	0	16
2017	Scotland	3	0	0	0	0
- Source: As of 29 April 2018
- Relatives: Kane Bentley (brother)

Andrew Bentley (born 13 May 1985) is a New Zealand professional rugby league footballer who plays as a hooker, second-row or loose forward for Toulouse Olympique in the Championship.

He is a France and Scotland international representative forward and has previously played for the Catalans Dragons in the Super League.

== Background ==
Bentley was born in New Zealand. Born to a New Zealand/Samoan father and New Zealand Maori/Scottish mother in Auckland, Bentley moved to France at a young age where his father played for La Réole XIII.

He is the older brother of fellow Scotland, and French international, Kane Bentley.

== Representative career ==
Bentley represented France at junior level for a number of years.

He was named in the France training squad for the 2008 Rugby League World Cup but did not make the final squad. Andrew represented France in 2009 4 nations (England, France, New Zealand and Australia) He represented France in the 2010 Alitalia European Cup. Bentley represented France in the 2013 Rugby League World Cup with his brother Kane.
