= Tuaalagi Lepupa =

Samoa international rugby league & 7s player

Personal information
- Born: Samoa

Playing information

Rugby league
- Position: Hooker, Lock
Representative
Years	Team	Pld	T	G	FG	P
2008–09	Samoa

Rugby union
- Position: Hooker
Club
Years	Team	Pld	T	G	FG	P
2008–09	Samoa (sevens)

Tuaalagi Lepupa is a Samoan rugby football international who has represented Samoa in both rugby league and rugby sevens, most notably at the 2008 Rugby League World Cup. Lepupa plays as a hooker or lock.

== Playing career ==
From the Marist Saints club in Samoa, Lepupua was named in the 2008 World Cup squad for Samoa. Lepupua was, along with Saints teammate Tupu Ulufale, one of only two domestic players named in the squad. Lepupua was named the Marist Saints Forward of the Year in 2008.

In 2009 Lepupa played in matches for the national side against PNG and British Amateur Rugby League Association. He was also part of the Samoan residents side that played a match against the New Zealand Residents in Auckland to raise funds for victims of the 2009 Samoa earthquake and tsunami.

Lepupa has also represented the Samoa rugby union sevens side in 2008 and 2009, being named in the squad for the 2008 London Sevens, and 2009 Hong Kong Sevens and Adelaide Sevens tournaments.
