= Gavin Cowan (rugby league) =

Former Scotland international rugby league footballer

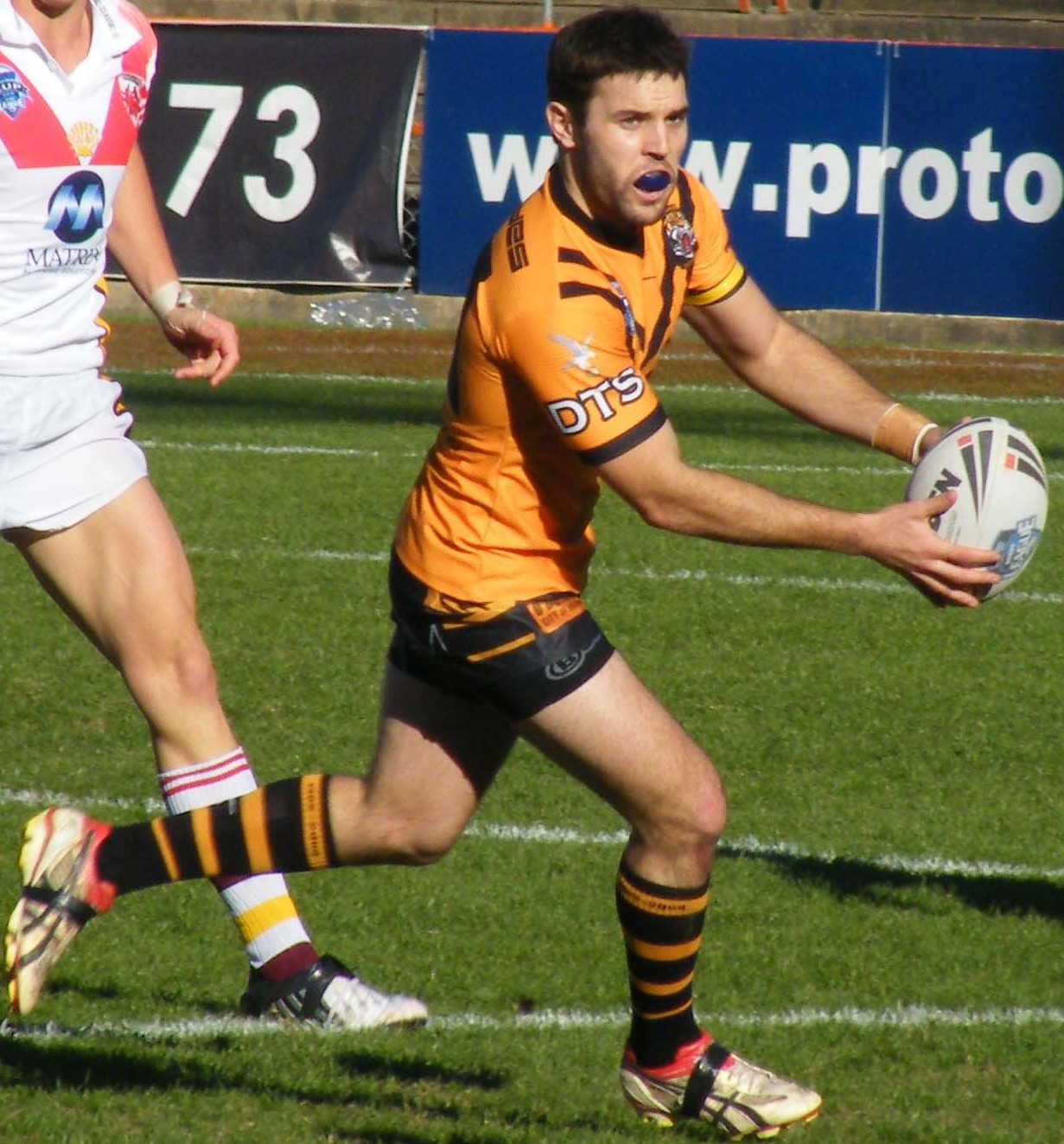

Personal information
- Born: 18 January 1987 (age 39) Australia
- Height: 5 ft 10 in (178 cm)
- Weight: 13 st 8 lb (86 kg)

Playing information
- Position: Centre, Wing
Representative
| Years | Team | Pld | T | G | FG | P |
|---|---|---|---|---|---|---|
| 2008 | Scotland | 2 | 0 | 0 | 0 | 0 |
- Source: As of 1 January 2009

Gavin Cowan (born 18 January 1987) is an Australian former professional rugby league footballer who played in the 2000s. He played at representative level for Scotland at the 2008 Rugby League World Cup, and at club level for Wests Tigers (reserve grade), as a fullback, wing or centre.

== Background ==
Gavin Cowan was born in Australia, he has Scottish ancestors, and eligible to play for Scotland due to the grandparent rule.

== Playing career ==
Cowan is a Scotland international player. He was named in the Scotland squad for the 2008 Rugby League World Cup. At the time, he was contracted to the Wests Tigers in Australia.
