= Josua Koroibulu =

Fijian rugby league footballer

Personal information
- Born: 13 March 1982 (age 43); Suva, Fiji
- Height: 181 cm (5 ft 11 in)
- Weight: 104 kg (16 st 5 lb)

Playing information
- Position: Prop, Second-row
Club
Years	Team	Pld	T	G	FG	P
	Milton-Ulladulla Bulldogs
	Guyra Super Spuds
	Armidale Rams
	Gympie Devils
	Total	0	0	0	0	0

Josua "Josh" Koroibulu is a Fijian professional rugby league footballer who has played for the Milton-Ulladulla Bulldogs, the Guyra Super Spuds and the Armidale Rams (of Group 19 Rugby League, in Armidale, New South Wales). In 2008 he was named rookie of the year by the Fiji National Rugby League. He was selected for Fiji squad in the 2008 Rugby League World Cup, but he did not play in any of Fiji's four matches.

In March 2010 he was selected for the Gympie Devils.
