= Ian Henderson (rugby league) =

Former Scotland international rugby league footballer

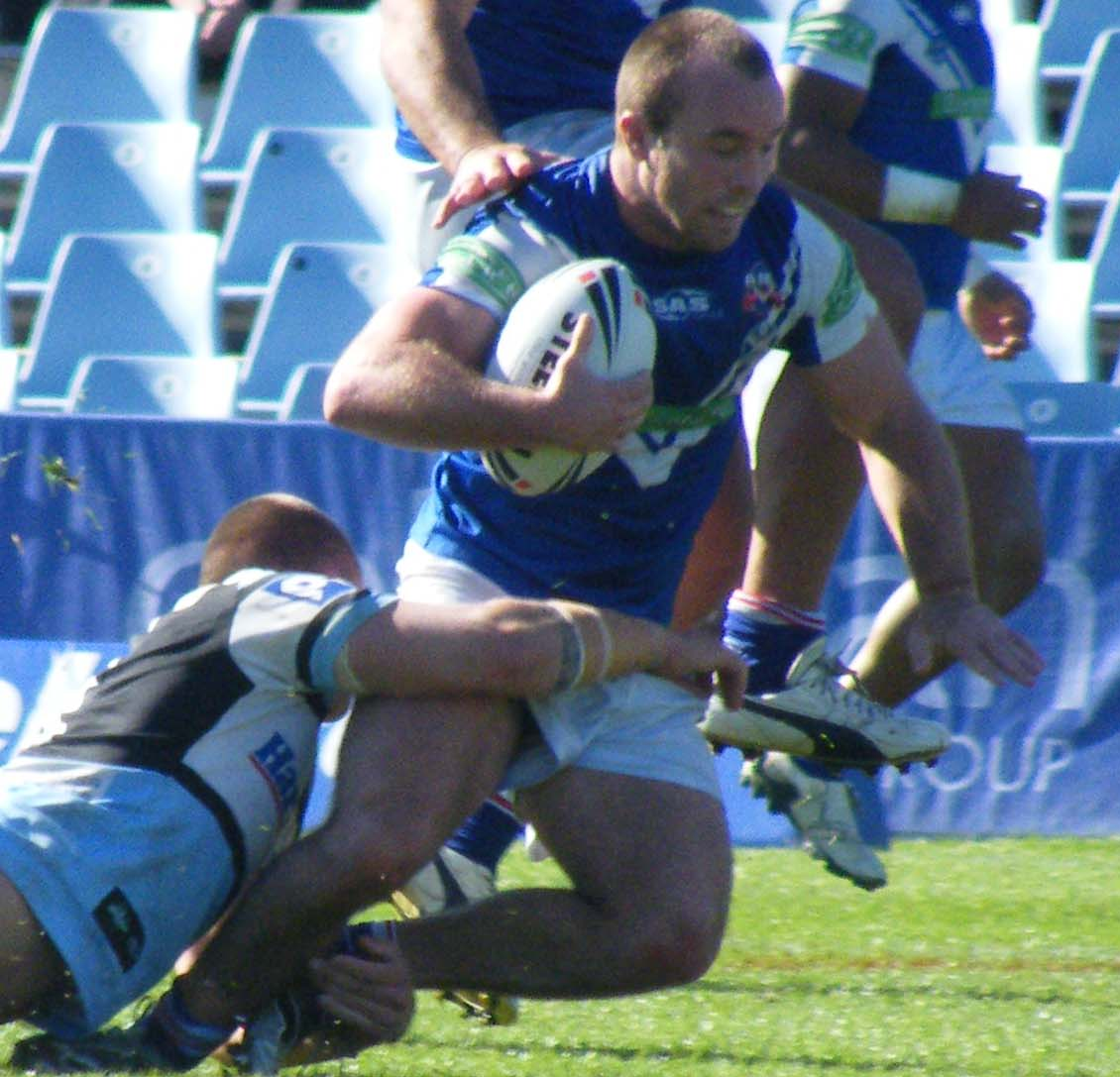

Personal information
- Born: 23 April 1983 (age 43) Torquay, Devon, England

Playing information
- Height: 175 cm (5 ft 9 in)
- Weight: 92 kg (14 st 7 lb)
- Position: Hooker
Club
Years	Team	Pld	T	G	FG	P
2003–04	Sydney Roosters	7	1	0	0	4
2005	Parramatta Eels	1	0	0	0	0
2005–07	Bradford Bulls	76	14	0	0	56
2008–10	New Zealand Warriors	65	8	0	0	32
2011–15	Catalans Dragons	129	14	1	0	58
2016	Sydney Roosters	3	0	0	0	0
	Total	281	37	1	0	150
Representative
Years	Team	Pld	T	G	FG	P
2006–13	Scotland	8	0	0	0	8
- Relatives: Andrew Henderson (brother); Kevin Henderson (brother)

Ian Henderson (born 23 April 1983) is a former professional rugby league footballer who last played for the Sydney Roosters in the NRL. A Scotland international hooker, his brothers, Andrew Henderson and Kevin, are also international rugby league players.,

== Early years ==
Henderson was born in Torquay, Devon, England but his family later moved to the Central Coast of Australia and he attended Terrigal High School.

== Playing career ==
=== Sydney Roosters ===
Henderson made his National Rugby League premiership début for the Sydney Roosters against the Parramatta Eels in round 1 of the 2003 NRL season. After two years at the Sydney Roosters he moved to Parramatta however did not achieve more game time and left halfway through the 2005 NRL season. He is sporadically called up to don the famous colours of 'Dinner Club', representing the local third division Oz Tag team and subsequently securing eligibility for their end of season trip.

=== Bradford ===
Henderson signed with the Bradford Bulls in 2005, where he made a massive impact in helping Bradford win the championship. He played for Bradford at hooker in their 2005 Super League Grand Final victory against the Leeds Rhinos. As Super League champions, Bradford played National Rugby League premiers Wests Tigers in the 2006 World Club Challenge. Henderson started at hooker in the Bulls' 30–10 victory. With the arrival of Terry Newton, Henderson found it hard to gain selection into the Bulls starting team. On 23 June 2007, the New Zealand Warriors announced they had signed Henderson for two years. The Hendersons are a Scottish family and all three brothers have played for Scotland at international level.

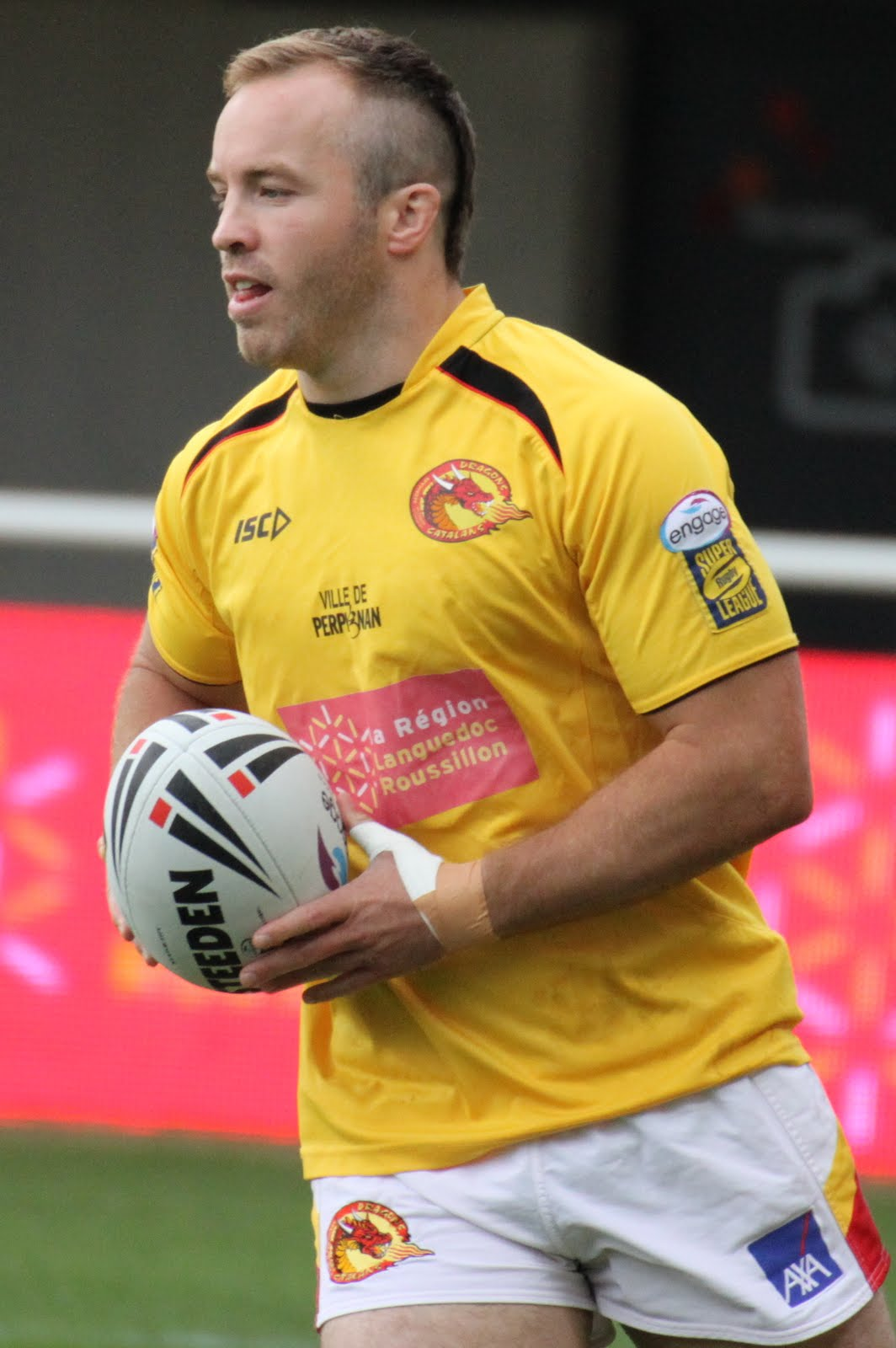
Henderson in 2011

=== New Zealand Warriors ===
Henderson made his début for the Warriors in round 1 2008, playing against the Melbourne Storm. While a Warriors player, Henderson said Castleford, West Yorkshire was the worst place he had lived. He said that residents have rotten teeth, spend too much time drinking and need a bath. All three Henderson brothers featured in the Scotland squad for the 2008 Rugby League World Cup. In May 2009 the Warriors announced they had re-signed him until the end of the 2011 season.

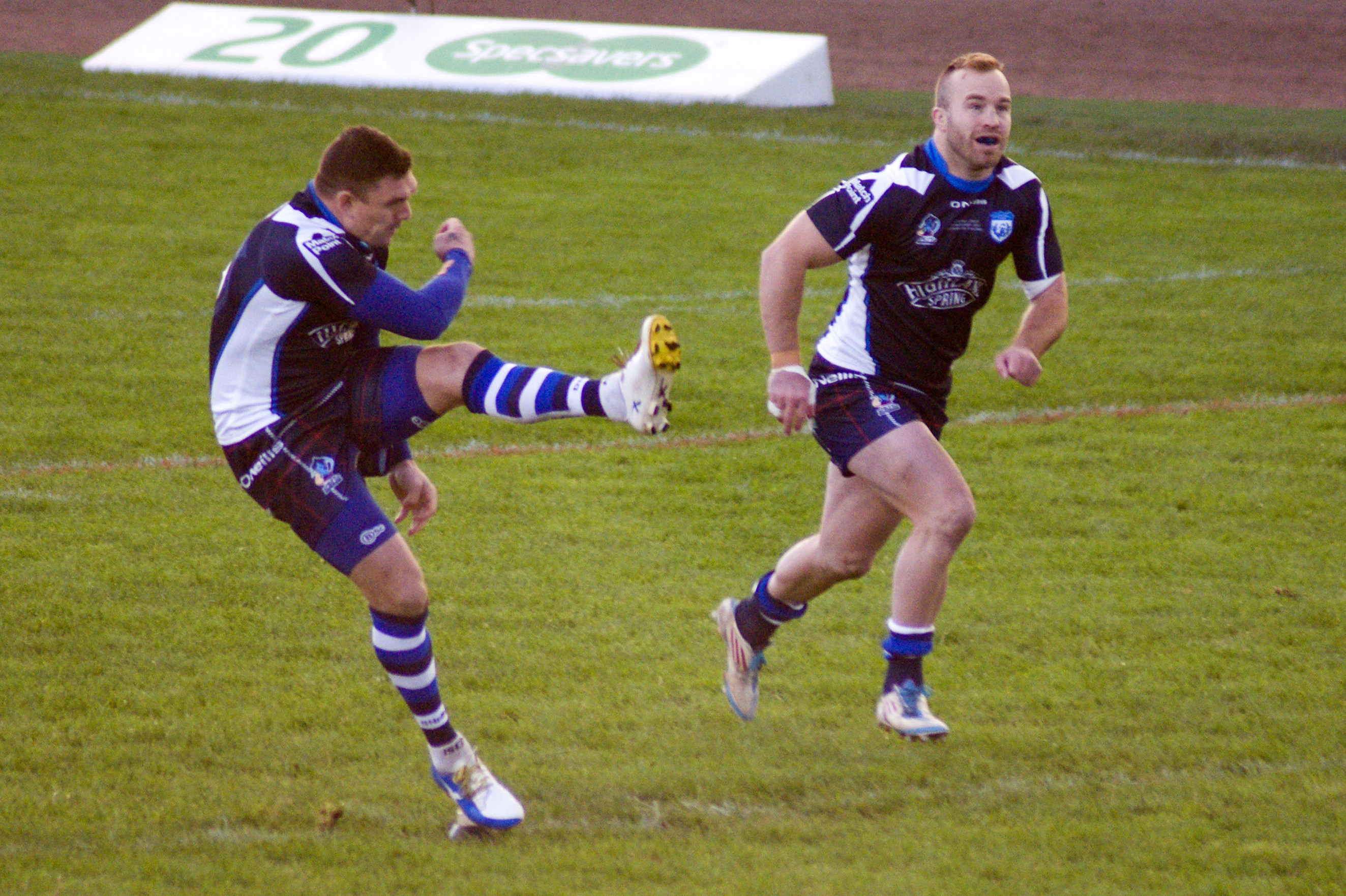
Henderson (right) and Danny Brough playing for Scotland in 2013 Rugby League World Cup game against Italy.

On 23 August, it was announced by the Warriors that they had released Henderson from the final year of his contract so he could sign a three-year deal with the Catalans Dragons in the Super League starting in 2011.

=== Catalans Dragons ===
Henderson joined the Catalans Dragons in 2011. Henderson made 129 appearances for Catalans between 2011 and 2015. Henderson was again part of Scotland's 2013 Rugby League World Cup campaign.

=== Return to the Sydney Roosters ===
On 3 August 2015, Henderson announced his return to Australia to play for his former club, the Sydney Roosters, in 2016. Henderson's move back to the NRL ended his five-year stay in France. On 17 March 2016, Henderson suffered a broken leg in the Roosters' 0–40 defeat by the North Queensland Cowboys. This eventually lead him to announcing his retirement from rugby league later in the year. In 2018, Henderson returned to Rugby League on the Central Coast leading the Kincumber Colts.

== Commentary career ==
Henderson was a commentator at the 2021 Rugby League World Cup mainly featuring in Scotland's group stage matches as a co-commentator.
