= Neil Lowe =

Former Scotland international rugby league footballer

Personal information
- Full name: Neil Lowe
- Born: 20 December 1978 (age 47) Leeds, West Yorkshire, England
- Height: 6 ft 1 in (1.85 m)
- Weight: 16 st 7 lb (105 kg)

Playing information
- Position: Second-row
Club
Years	Team	Pld	T	G	FG	P
1997–02	Featherstone Rovers
2003	Salford City Reds
2004–05	Featherstone Rovers
2006–07	Doncaster
2007	York City Knights
2008–09	Keighley Cougars
2009–12	Hunslet Hawks
	Total	0	0	0	0	0
Representative
Years	Team	Pld	T	G	FG	P
1999–11	Scotland	7	1	0	0	4

Neil Lowe (born 20 December 1978) is a former Scotland international rugby league footballer who played in the 1990s, 2000s and 2010s. He played at club level for Featherstone Rovers, Salford, Doncaster, York City Knights, Keighley Cougars and the Hunslet Hawks, as a second-row.

== Background ==
Lowe was born in Leeds, West Yorkshire, England.

== Playing career ==
He was named in the Scotland training squad for the 2008 Rugby League World Cup.

He was named in the Scotland squad for the 2008 Rugby League World Cup.

== First Division Grand Final appearances ==
Neil Lowe played at second-row in Featherstone Rovers' 22–24 defeat by Wakefield Trinity in the 1998 First Division Grand Final at McAlpine Stadium, Huddersfield on 26 September 1998.
