= Brendon Lindsay =

Former Scotland international rugby league footballer

Personal information
- Born: 21 September 1977 (age 48) Australia

Playing information
- Position: Halfback
Club
Years	Team	Pld	T	G	FG	P
–2006	Ipswich Jets	90	33			224
2006–10	Sheffield Eagles
	Total	90	33	0	0	224
Representative
Years	Team	Pld	T	G	FG	P
2007–10	Scotland
- As of 13 November 2014

Brendon Lindsay (born 21 September 1977) is a former Scotland international rugby league footballer who played as a stand-off.

== Background ==
Lindsay was born in Australia.

== Career ==
He played for the Gold Coast Vikings in the 1998 Queensland Cup.

He later played in 90 games for the Ipswich Jets in the Queensland Cup. He scored 33 tries and a total of 224 points.

He signed for Sheffield Eagles in 2006 and played for 5 seasons, combining his role as a player with community work and as part of the club administration staff.
