= Iestyn Harris =

Wales dual-code rugby international (born 1976)

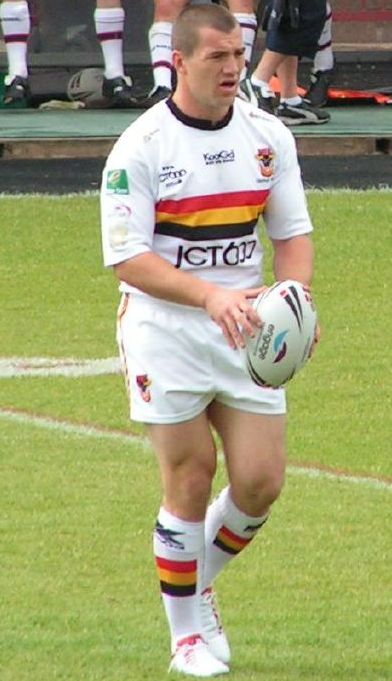

Personal information
- Full name: Iestyn Rhys Harris
- Born: 25 June 1976 (age 50) Oldham, Greater Manchester, England

Playing information
- Height: 5 ft 8 in (1.73 m)
- Weight: 14 st 6 lb (92 kg)

Rugby league
- Position: Stand-off, Fullback
Club
Years	Team	Pld	T	G	FG	P
1993–97	Warrington Wolves	92	37	182	4	516
1997–01	Leeds Rhinos	139	65	594	7	1455
2004–08	Bradford Bulls	132	37	111	2	372
2009	Featherstone Rovers	24	7	36	1	101
	Total	387	146	923	14	2444
Representative
Years	Team	Pld	T	G	FG	P
1994–07	Wales	20	12	58	1	165
1996–05	Great Britain	13	2	10	0	127

Rugby union
- Position: Outside-half, Inside centre
Club
Years	Team	Pld	T	G	FG	P
2001–03	Cardiff RFC	59	20	0	0	437
2003–04	Cardiff Blues	10	0	33	0	82
	Total	69	20	33	0	519
Representative
Years	Team	Pld	T	G	FG	P
2001–04	Wales	25	1	41	0	108

Coaching information
Club
Years	Team	Gms	W	D	L	W%
2011	Crusaders RL	28	6	0	22	21
2014–15	Salford Red Devils	21	8	1	12	38
	Total	49	14	1	34	29
Representative
Years	Team	Gms	W	D	L	W%
2009–13	Wales	17	7	0	10	41
- Education: North Chadderton School
- Relatives: Norman Harris (grandfather)

Iestyn Rhys Harris (born 25 June 1976) is a former dual-code international professional rugby league and rugby union footballer who played in the 1990s and 2000s, and coach in rugby league in the 2000s and 2010s. He played representative rugby league for Great Britain and Wales, and at club level for the Warrington Wolves, the Leeds Rhinos (captain) where he won the 1998 Man of Steel Award, the Bradford Bulls (captain), and Featherstone Rovers, and representative rugby union for Wales, and at club level for Cardiff RFC and Cardiff Blues, and has coached representative rugby league for Wales, and at club level for Featherstone Rovers (assistant coach), the Crusaders Rugby League (initially as assistant coach under Brian Noble, and then head coach), the Wigan Warriors (assistant coach), and Salford Red Devils (head coach).

== Early life ==
Harris was born in Oldham, Greater Manchester, England. His Abercarn-born grandfather Norman Harris played rugby union for Abercarn RFC, Ebbw Vale RFC, Pontypool RFC and Newbridge RFC before heading north to win eight Wales caps in rugby league.

== Early Rugby League career ==
=== Warrington ===
Harris' professional career began with league club Warrington at age 17 in 1993 before a record-breaking £350,000 transfer to Leeds in 1997.

Iestyn Harris played at centre in Warrington's 10–40 defeat by Wigan in the 1994–95 Regal Trophy Final during the 1994–95 season at Alfred McAlpine Stadium, Huddersfield on Saturday 28 January 1995.

=== Leeds ===
Harris was made captain of Leeds Rhinos in his first full season at the club at the age of twenty-one, and became the first Leeds captain in a decade to lift silverware when Leeds Rhinos claimed the 1999 Challenge Cup.

Harris initially played at fullback before being switched to stand-off. In 1998, despite having played most of his games at fullback, he was named in the half backs in 1998's Super League Dream Team and also collected the annual Man of Steel trophy as the best player in the Super League. He captained Leeds Rhinos from fullback in their 1998 Super League Grand Final defeat by the Wigan Warriors.

A superb goal-kicker, Harris broke the club record for goals in a season in 1999 with 168, he was named at stand-off in 1999's Super League IV Dream Team, and broke the 2,000 career points total two years later.

Harris matched the record for scoring the most points in a Challenge Cup Final when he scored 20 points (1 try, and 8 conversions) in Leeds' 52–16 victory over London Broncos in the 1999 Challenge Cup Final during Super League IV at Wembley Stadium, London on 1 May 1999. This equalled the record set by Neil Fox (2 tries and 7 goals) in Wakefield Trinity's victory over Hull F.C. in the 1960 Challenge Cup Final.

== Cardiff and Wales RU ==
In 2001, Harris made a £1.5 million switch to Cardiff RFC and Wales.

Harris made his debut for the Welsh side on 10 November 2001, playing against Argentina in Cardiff; Wales lost 16–30. Having played only 200 minutes of rugby union before his international debut, Harris struggled, particularly with his tactical kicking. This led to a move from fly-half to inside centre, where he could be creative with less pressure.

=== World Cup 2003 ===
Harris played in the 2003 Rugby World Cup in Australia, where Wales lost in the quarter-finals to eventual winners, England, despite leading the game for 60 minutes. Harris won 25 Wales caps as a union player but made it clear that he wanted to return to League.

== Return to Rugby League ==
=== Bradford Bulls ===
In 2004, Harris returned to rugby league, citing "family reasons". He joined Bradford Bulls after a contractual fight with former club Leeds. His salary was reputed to be £1 million over four seasons. Harris played for the Bradford Bulls at stand-off in their 2004 Super League Grand Final loss against the Leeds Rhinos. Harris was selected in the Great Britain team to compete in the end of season 2004 Rugby League Tri-Nations tournament. In the final against Australia he played at stand-off in the Lions' 44–4 loss.

Harris wrote a book, published in October 2005, detailing his moves between codes, called Iestyn Harris: There and Back – My Journey from League to Union and Back Again. Harris was part of the 2005 Bradford Bulls squad that became the first side in the history of Super League to win the Grand Final when finishing third in the final league ladder. He played for the Bradford Bulls at stand-off, kicking a goal in their 2005 Super League Grand Final victory against Leeds Rhinos.

Harris was Bradford Bulls' captain for one year in 2006, taking over from Leeds-bound Jamie Peacock. As Super League champions Bradford Bulls faced National Rugby League premiers Wests Tigers in the 2006 World Club Challenge. Harris captained the Bradford Bulls from stand-off, kicking five goals from six attempts in their 30–10 victory. On 10 May 2006, Harris announced he would be retiring from playing international rugby league with Great Britain, just a week after being named in a 36-strong training squad for a June 2006 Test against New Zealand. Harris, who won the last of his 15 Great Britain caps against Australia in November 2005, said he wanted to concentrate on his club career. On 26 September 2006, he confirmed that he would continue to play for Wales, and was scheduled to return to the side against Scotland at the Brewery Field, Bridgend in the 2008 Rugby League World Cup qualifying match on Sunday 29 October 2006. He was forced to pull out through injury hours before kick-off. Harris kicked a club record 15 goals against Toulouse Olympique in a record 98–6 win on 19 April 2008. Harris had been linked to a player-coach role with Crusaders, but he decided to sign for National League One club Featherstone Rovers instead.

=== Featherstone Rovers ===
Harris signed a 2-year deal at Featherstone Rovers, as well as playing, he also took his first steps into coaching and working in the marketing department of the club, he made his debut for Featherstone Rovers on Sunday 15 February 2009, he also ultimately made a lot of debt for Bradford Bulls, and he played his last match for Featherstone Rovers during the 2009 season. On announcement of his tenure as assistant coach to Brian Noble at Celtic Crusaders, he agreed termination of his contract at Featherstone Rovers and an immediate end to his playing career.

== Coaching career ==
=== Wales National Rugby League team ===
While still playing for Bradford, Harris was appointed Wales Assistant Coach on 18 June 2008. On 22 September 2009, Harris was appointed Wales's rugby league head coach, succeeding John Dixon. Appointed alongside Harris were the more experienced Kevin Ellis and Clive Griffiths, and the trio's first match was against England on 17 October, which they lost 48–12.

Wales qualified for the 2011 Rugby League Four Nations, and therefore won the Tournament's co-hosting rights with England. Unfortunately, as expected, Wales lost all of games, but they put up great fights. They lost by 42–4 against England, but they played well against the Kiwis at Wembley Stadium in London. Wales lost by 36–0, but New Zealand were frustrated by not being able to play their attacking football full of flair, and this was due to Harris' team's good defence. Then surprisingly, in Wales' (and Welsh legend Lee Briers last game of his international career) final game of the Tournament, Wales shocked all odds, as they had an early 8–0 lead, against world heavyweights Australia, after 14 minutes. It took Australia until just before half-time to take the lead. Harris' men would then go on to lose the game 56–14, but he still gave Lee Briers a fitting farewell.

Iestyn coached Wales in the 2013 Rugby League World Cup held in their own country and fellow British nation England. Unfortunately Iestyn's side didn't get a single win at the event, and they gave history to each of the teams that defeated them. Italy won their first World Cup match in their first appearance, USA in their annual tournament advanced to the quarter-final, and the Cook Islands won their first ever World Cup match.

On 9 April 2014, Harris resigned from the Wales post, after taking up the head coaching role at the Super League club, the Salford Red Devils.

=== Crusaders Rugby League ===
On 14 October 2009, Harris was announced as assistant coach to Brian Noble at Wales-based Crusaders Rugby League, alongside Jon Sharp. After a year as assistant it was announced in November 2010 that Harris would take over as head coach of Crusaders following the resignation of Brian Noble. His first official game in charge was against Salford on Sunday 13 February 2011 in the opening round of the Super League. The game was played at the Millennium Stadium as part of the Magic Weekend.

=== Wigan Warriors ===
In 2011, Harris became the assistant coach at former club Wigan.

=== Salford Red Devils ===
In 2014, it was announced by Marwan Koukash that Harris would take over from Brian Noble as head coach at Salford Red Devils. The appointment was described as a "huge gamble". In Harris' first match in charge, Salford played away from home and defeated Bradford Bulls by 38–24.

In September 2015, after being absent from the club for two months, Salford mutually sacked Harris from his post as head coach of the club.

== Media career ==
Iestyn regularly provides expert TV and radio analysis including BBC's Super League Show, and contributes to BBC Radio Five Live's rugby league coverage.

== Author ==
Harris released his autobiography Iestyn Harris: There and Back - My Journey from League to Union and Back Again in 2005.

== Personal life ==
Harris lives in Cheshire, England, he is married to Becky Harris with whom he has a daughter; Catrin, and a younger son; Cameron, he also has a sister; Rhiain.

== Statistics ==
=== Rugby League ===
==== Club career ====
Year	Club	Apps	Pts	T	G	FG
1993–94	Warrington	10	54	4	19	–
1994–95	Warrington	39	148	18	38	–
1995–96	Warrington	23	156	11	55	2
1996	Warrington	18	152	4	67	2
1997	Warrington	2	6	-	3	–
1997	Leeds	25	183	7	77	1
1998	Leeds	26	275	13	110	3
1999	Leeds	31	343	18	135	1
2000	Leeds	23	252	11	106	–
2001	Leeds	18	185	8	76	1
2004	Bradford Bulls	13	30	6	3	-
2005	Bradford Bulls	32	104	17	17	2
2006	Bradford Bulls	30	42	5	11	–
2007	Bradford Bulls	22	72	5	26	–
2008	Bradford Bulls	11	8	-	4	-
2009	Featherstone Rovers	24	101	8	34	1

==== Representative career ====
Year	Team	Matches	Tries	Goals	Field Goals	Points
1995	Wales	?	?	?	?	?
1999	Great Britain	1	1	1	0	6
2000	Wales	1	0	0	0	0
2004	Great Britain	3	0	2	0	4
2005	Great Britain	3	0	8	0	16
