= Jack Pring =

Welsh rugby league footballer

Personal information
- Full name: Jack Pring
- Born: 25 January 1993 (age 33) Cardiff, Wales

Playing information
- Position: Wing, Centre
Club
Years	Team	Pld	T	G	FG	P
2011	South Wales Scorpions	3	0	0	0	0
2012	Leeds Rhinos
2013–14	South Wales Scorpions	25	3	0	0	12
	Total	28	3	0	0	12
Representative
Years	Team	Pld	T	G	FG	P
2010–2012	Wales	2	0	0	0	0

Jack Pring (born 25 January 1993) is a Welsh professional rugby league footballer. He played at representative level for Wales, and at club level for Leeds Rhinos and South Wales Scorpions. His regular position is centre.

== Background ==
Jack Pring was born in Cardiff, Wales.

== Club career ==
Pring began his rugby league career in the junior ranks at Crusaders. South Wales Scorpions signed Pring on dual registration in 2011 before he joined Leeds Rhinos in 2012, playing in their U20's side. He rejoined South Wales Scorpions for the 2013 and 2014 seasons.

== International honours ==
Jack Pring made his début for Wales against Italy in 2010. He won his second cap against France in 2012.
