= Gary Broadbent =

English rugby league footballer

Personal information
- Born: 31 October 1976 (age 49) Barrow-in-Furness, England

Playing information
- Position: Fullback, Centre, Stand-off
Club
Years	Team	Pld	T	G	FG	P
1994–97	Widnes Vikings	60	6	0	0	24
1997–02	Salford City Reds	131	24	0	0	96
2003–08	Whitehaven	10	1	0	0	4
2009–11	Barrow Raiders	78	10	1	0	42
	Total	279	41	1	0	166
Representative
Years	Team	Pld	T	G	FG	P
1998	Emerging England	1	0	0	0	0
2003	Cumbria	1	1	0	0	4

Gary Broadbent (born 31 October 1976), also known as "Broady", is an English former rugby league footballer who played in the 1990s, 2000s and 2010s.

He played at representative level for England, and at club level for the Widnes Vikings and the Salford City Reds in the Super League and Whitehaven and the Barrow Raiders in National League One, as a fullback, centre or stand-off.

== Background ==
Broadbent was born in Barrow-in-Furness, Cumbria, England and raised on Walney Island.

== Club career ==
Broadbent left the Widnes Vikings for the Salford City Reds in 1997 for a fee of £50,000 (based on increases in average earnings, this would be approximately £86,080 in 2013).

He then joined Whitehaven in 2003. In 2008, he became the club record holder for most consecutive appearances, breaking the previous record set by David Fatialofa. He went on to make 83 appearances without missing a game for the club.

He finished his career with hometown club Barrow, playing his last game in September 2011 against Toulouse Olympique.

== International honours ==
Gary Broadbent won a cap for Emerging England while at Salford in 1998 in a 15–12 victory over Wales.

== Personal life ==
Broadbent is employed by BNFL at Sellafield, and currently resides in Barrow-in-Furness with his wife, Emma and together they have two children, Sophie (born 1999) and Luke (born 2002).
