= Crawford Matthews =

Former Scotland international rugby league footballer

Personal information
- Born: 23 November 1991 (age 34) Norwich, England

Playing information
- Position: Fullback
Club
| Years | Team | Pld | T | G | FG | P |
|---|---|---|---|---|---|---|
| | Gateshead Thunder |
Representative
| Years | Team | Pld | T | G | FG | P |
| 2011 | Scotland | 2 | 0 | 0 | 0 | 0 |
- Source: RLP As of 8 January 2021

Crawford Matthews (born 23 November 1991) is a former Scotland international rugby league footballer who previously played for the Gateshead Thunder in League 1.

== Background ==
Born in Norwich, Matthews attended Heaton Manor School, and started his rugby league career at the age of 14 with amateur club Gateshead Panthers. He later moved to Gateshead Thunder.

== Club career ==
=== Hull FC ===
In September 2010, Matthews joined Super League side Hull F.C. Where he combined his rugby with under-graduate studies at the University of Hull. Although he played regularly for the under-20 side, he never made an appearance for the first team.

== International career ==
Matthews has represented Scotland at under-16, under-18, 'A' team level, Students, 9s and made two appearances for the senior professional team against Ireland and France in 2011. He was also a member of the ashes winning Great Britain & Ireland Academic Lions squad in Australia 2011 - scoring a try in the final test.
