= Kane Bentley =

Scotland & France international rugby league footballer

Kane "Kano" Bentley
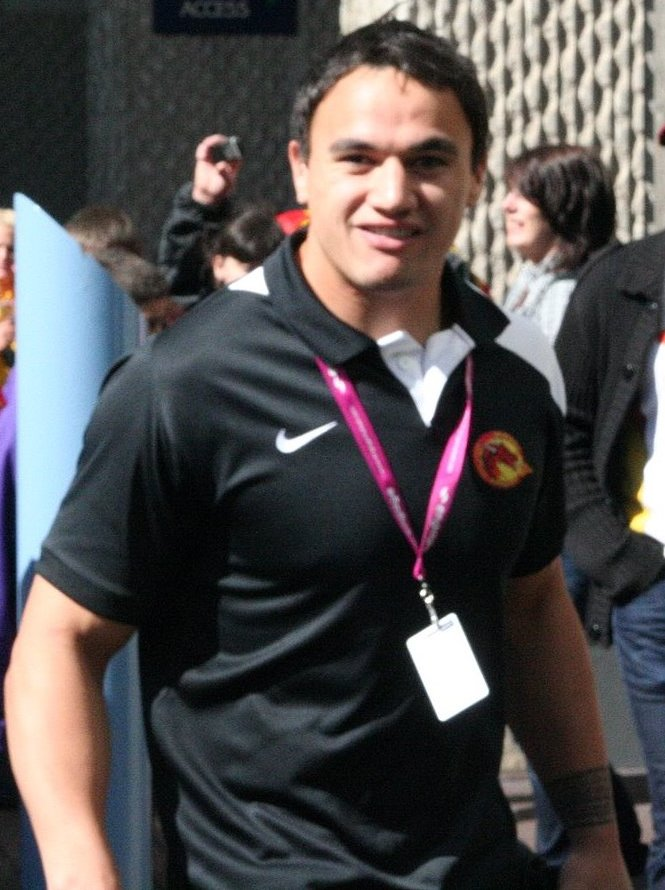

Personal information
- Full name: Kane Bentley
- Born: 16 April 1987 (age 39) Auckland, New Zealand
- Height: 5 ft 8 in (1.72 m)
- Weight: 14 st 0 lb (89 kg)

Playing information
- Position: Hooker
Club
| Years | Team | Pld | T | G | FG | P |
|---|---|---|---|---|---|---|
| 2007–10 | Catalans Dragons | 39 | 6 | 0 | 0 | 24 |
| 2010–11 | Pia Donkeys | 14 | 7 | 0 | 0 | 28 |
| 2011–12 | Lézignan Sangliers | 9 | 4 | 0 | 0 | 16 |
| 2013 | Dewsbury Rams | 13 | 2 | 0 | 0 | 8 |
| 2013–15 | Toulouse Olympique | 24 | 6 | 0 | 0 | 24 |
| 2016–20 | Toulouse Olympique | 35 | 8 | 0 | 0 | 12 |
| 2020– | St Gaudens Bears | 17 | 1 | 0 | 0 | 4 |
| | Total | 151 | 34 | 0 | 0 | 116 |
Representative
| Years | Team | Pld | T | G | FG | P |
| 2009–13 | France | 15 | 6 | 0 | 0 | 24 |
| 2017–18 | Scotland | 6 | 0 | 0 | 0 | 0 |
- Source: As of 1 November 2022
- Relatives: Andrew Bentley (brother)

Kane Bentley (born 16 April 1987) is a professional rugby league footballer who plays as a hooker for the St Gaudens Bears in the Elite One Championship. He has played for both France and Scotland at international level.

He previously played for Toulouse Olympique Broncos in the Elite One Championship.

== Early years ==
Bentley was born in New Zealand, he has Scottish ancestors, and eligible to play for Scotland due to the grandparent rule.

Born to a New Zealand/Samoan father and New Zealand Maori mother in Auckland, Bentley moved to France at a young age where his father played for La Réole XIII.

== Playing career ==
His senior league started at Marseilles then UTC. In 2007, he gained promotion to the Dragons first team squad alongside his brother Andrew, and then moved to Toulouse. In 2015 he signed with the Boston 13s in the United States, helping them to the 2015 USARL Championship.

=== Saint-Gaudens Bears ===
On 3 June 2020 it was reported that he had signed for Saint-Gaudens Bears in the Elite One Championship

== Representative career ==
Bentley represented France at junior level for a number of years.

He was named in the France squad for the 2008 Rugby League World Cup, and for the Four Nations tournament. Bentley was also eligible for Scotland but he was snubbed for the European Cup, and instead opted to play for France.

He has since been a regular for the senior side, and was named in the squad for the 2013 Rugby League World Cup.
