= Andrew Henderson (rugby league) =

Rugby league footballer and coach

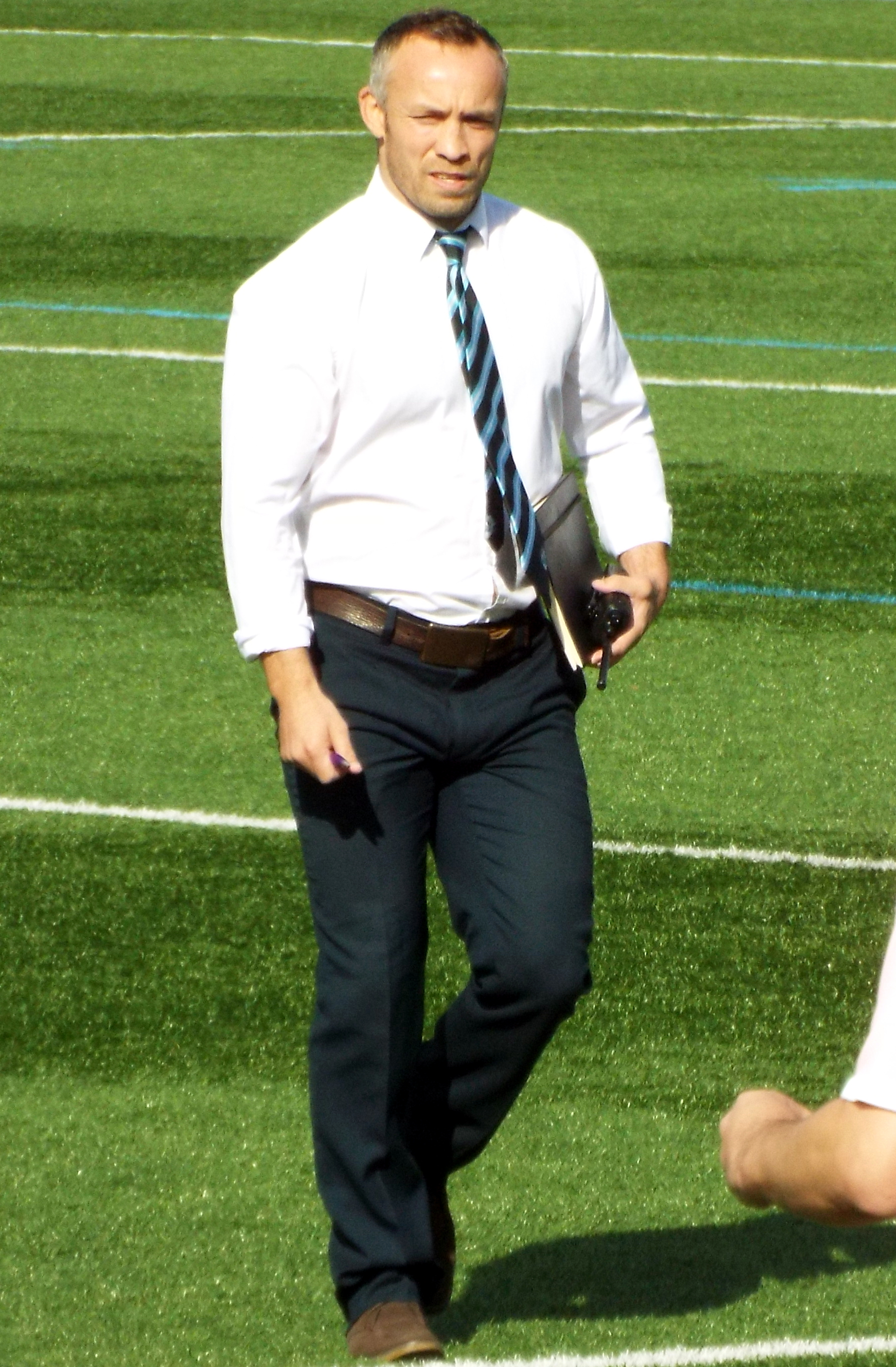

Personal information
- Born: 17 June 1979 (age 47) Torquay, Devon, England
- Height: 5 ft 8 in (172 cm)
- Weight: 13 st 3 lb (84 kg)

Playing information
- Position: Hooker
Club
Years	Team	Pld	T	G	FG	P
2001	Salford City Reds
2002–03	Barrow Raiders	71	22	0	0	100
2004	Balmain Tigers	26	10	0	0	40
2005–08	Castleford Tigers	115	22	0	0	88
2009	Gateshead Thunder	26	7	0	0	28
2010	Barrow Raiders	12	3	0	0	12
2010–14	Sheffield Eagles	130	20	0	0	80
2015	London Broncos	15	0	0	0	0
	Total	395	84	0	0	348
Representative
Years	Team	Pld	T	G	FG	P
2003–13	Scotland	23	4	0	0	16

Coaching information
Club
Years	Team	Gms	W	D	L	W%
2013	Sheffield Hallam Eagles	17	16	0	1	94
2015–17	London Broncos	92	54	1	37	59
2023–24	York Knights	48	25	0	23	52
	Total	157	95	1	61	61
- Source: As of 5 Jun 2024
- Relatives: Ian Henderson (brother); Kevin Henderson (brother)

Andrew Henderson (born 17 June 1979) is a professional rugby league coach who is the Director of Rugby at Leigh Leopards in the English Super League and a former professional rugby league footballer who played for Scotland at international level.

He is the former assistant coach of the Warrington Wolves in the Super League, the former head of rugby at the Keighley Cougars and former head coach of the London Broncos. He played professionally as a hooker, representing Gateshead Thunder, Castleford Tigers, Balmain Tigers, Salford City Reds, Barrow Raiders and the Sheffield Eagles over a 14 year playing career. He was also a former Scotland international rugby league footballer.

== Background ==
He was born in Torquay, Devon, England. In 1988, his family emigrated to Australia.

== Playing career ==
Henderson began his professional career in England in 2001 with Super League side Salford City Reds. With limited opportunities there, Henderson moved to Northern Ford Premiership club Barrow Raiders for the 2002 and 2003 seasons. He captained the Raiders for the 2003 season. Soon after, Super League side Widnes Vikings snapped up Henderson for a trial period, in which he featured for them in the 2004 Sydney World Sevens tournament, and a friendly match against the Wests Tigers. He failed to agree a deal with Widnes and subsequently joined the Wests Tigers, captaining their premier league side Balmain Tigers in 2004.

Henderson joined Castleford Tigers for the 2005 season after their relegation from the Super League. He spent 4 seasons at the club. Henderson captained the side twice to promotion to the Super League in 2005 and 2007. The 2008 Super League season was to be his final year at the Tigers.

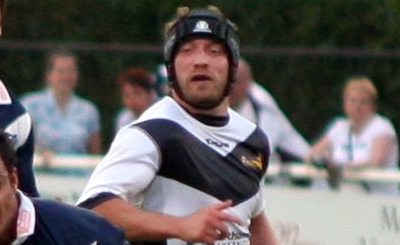
Henderson playing for Gateshead Thunder

Henderson signed for Championship side Gateshead Thunder for the 2009 season. He spent only one season with Gateshead as the club were faced with financial problems and a shareholders dispute leading them into administration. This forced him to look elsewhere and he joined Championship winners Barrow Raiders in the 2009 close season on a two-year deal. Henderson left Barrow not long after and joined Sheffield Eagles towards the end of the 2010 season, due to the Barrow club failing to honour his contract.

Henderson went on to play for just over four seasons with Sheffield, with 2014 being his final year. His time here was successful, helping his side make a grand final appearance in 2011 and achieve back to back grand final victories in 2012, and 2013.

The Hendersons are a Scottish family and all three brothers played for Scotland at international level. Henderson began his international career in 2003 featuring in the European Nations Cup. He went on to make 17 test appearances in European competitions and 5 World Cup appearances in 2008 and 2013 finishing his international career in Scotland's World Cup quarter final match against New Zealand in Leeds.

All three brothers featured in the Scotland squad for the 2008 Rugby League World Cup.

== Coaching career ==
=== Sheffield Hallam Eagles ===
On 24 February 2013, Henderson was appointed the head coach of a new community club, Sheffield Hallam Eagles, run by Sheffield Eagles, and Sheffield Hallam University. In their first season, Henderson's team lost just once all season, winning the Conference League South beating Nottingham Outlaws in the grand final.

=== London Broncos ===
On 11 July 2014, London Broncos head coach Joe Grima appointed Henderson as his assistant beginning in November. On 2 March 2015, Joey Grima resigned after ten months in charge and just three games into the Championship season. Henderson took charge of the Championship side on an interim basis. After 2 games in charge with 1 win and 1 loss, he was appointed as the Broncos new permanent head coach. In 2015, Henderson led the Broncos to 3rd place in the Championship Shield, eventually losing the Shield Final to Featherstone Rovers 34–6 at the Select Security Stadium in Widnes. In 2016, he guided the London Broncos to a 2nd-place finish in the Championship taking them into the Super 8's Qualifiers for the chance to gain promotion. The club finished a reasonable 6th place on points difference with wins over Batley, Salford and Featherstone. They just missed out on the million pound game to Salford. In 2017, they again finished 2nd in the Championship and 6th place in the Super 8's Qualifiers. Henderson was awarded the Kingstone Press Championship Coach of the Year award after another successful season with London. The London Broncos won on all three occasions under the guidance of Henderson at the Summer Bash event. They recorded a 42–6 win and 32–14 win over the Sheffield Eagles in 2015 and 2016. In 2017 they defeated Featherstone Rovers 42–16.

=== Warrington Wolves ===
Henderson joined Warrington ahead of the 2018 season as assistant coach to Steve Price. He spent 4 seasons at the club before moving into a Head of Rugby role with the Keighley Cougars. During his time the team finished as Challenge Cup and grand finalists in 2018, followed by a Challenge Cup final win in 2019. His final two seasons saw the wolves finish as semi finalists in both competitions.

=== York Knights ===
On 18 October 2022, Henderson signed a five-year deal to become the new head coach of York Knights.

On 5 June 2024, it was reported Henderson had taken the position of Head of Rugby at York and that the head coach role had been handed over to Mark Applegarth.

== Coaching statistics ==
As of 23 September 2017

Team	From	To	Record							
Team	From	To	G	W	D	L	PF	PA	PD	Win %
London Broncos	2 March 2015	Present	92	54	1	37	2,743	1,971	+772	58.70
