= Aaron Smith (rugby league, born 1982) =

English rugby league footballer

Personal information
- Born: 10 September 1982 (age 43) England

Playing information
- Position: Hooker, Loose forward
Club
Years	Team	Pld	T	G	FG	P
2003–04	Bradford Bulls	15	3	0	0	12
2005–06	Castleford Tigers	25	1	0	0	4
2006–07	Whitehaven	42	5	0	0	20
2008–09	Leigh Centurions	38	7	0	0	28
2010	Swinton Lions	6	0	0	0	0
2012	Sheffield Eagles	1	0	0	0	0
	Total	127	16	0	0	64

Aaron Smith (born 10 September 1982) is a former professional rugby league player. He played as a hooker and loose forward. He played for the Castleford Tigers, Bradford Bulls, Whitehaven, Leigh Centurions and Sheffield Eagles.

== Playing career ==
Smith debuted for Bradford Bulls in May 2003.

Having won Super League VIII, Bradford played against 2003 NRL Premiers, the Penrith Panthers in the 2004 World Club Challenge. Smith played at hooker in the Bulls' 22–4 victory. That year he also captained the Bradford Bulls Academy to victory against the Leeds Rhinos Academy in the Grand final, winning the man of the match and lifting the trophy.

In October 2004, Smith signed a two-year contract with Castleford Tigers.
