= Kevin Henderson (rugby league) =

Former Scotland international rugby league footballer

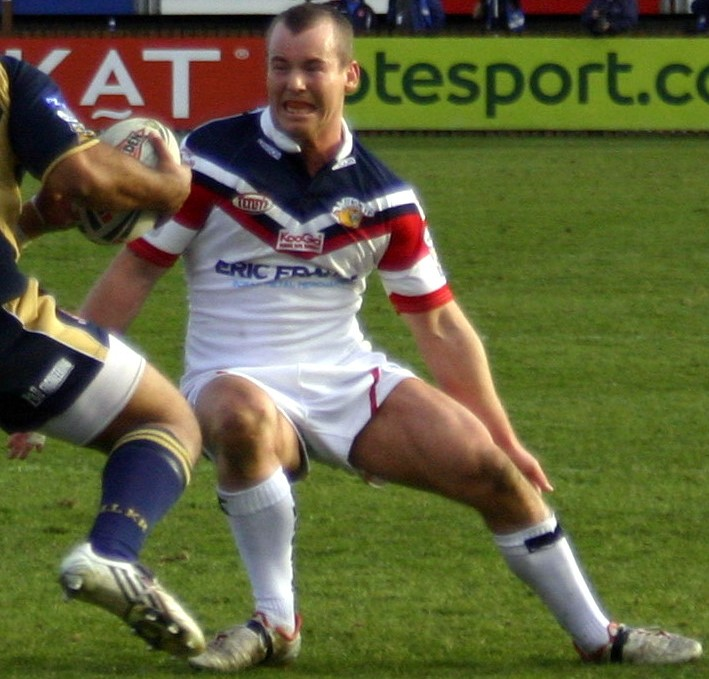

Personal information
- Born: 10 January 1981 (age 45) Torquay, Devon, England

Playing information
- Height: 5 ft 11 in (1.80 m)
- Weight: 15 st 4 lb (97 kg)
- Position: Second-row, Centre
Club
Years	Team	Pld	T	G	FG	P
2004	Newcastle Knights	4	0	0	0	0
2005	Leigh Centurions	1	0	0	0	0
2005–11	Wakefield Trinity Wildcats	127	12	0	0	48
2011–12	Montpellier	14	2	0	0	8
2012	Leigh Centurions	13	2	0	0	8
	Total	159	16	0	0	64
Representative
Years	Team	Pld	T	G	FG	P
2008	Scotland	4	0	0	0	0
- Relatives: Andrew Henderson (brother); Ian Henderson (brother)

Kevin Henderson is a former Scotland international rugby league footballer. Henderson previously played in Australia for the Newcastle Knights and in England for the Leigh Centurions and Wakefield Trinity Wildcats. Both of his brothers, Andrew (23 caps) and Ian (8 caps) have also played for Scotland.

== Background ==
Henderson was born in Torquay, Devon, England.

== Playing career ==
Henderson played only a handful of NRL games for the Newcastle Knights team, however played mostly in reserve grade. He also played reserve grade for the South Sydney Rabbitohs, and Central Coast Bears. He came to England to pursue his professional career in 2005. He joined Leigh in super league before transferring mid-season to rival super league club the Wakefield Trinity Wildcats. Henderson is one of three brothers playing rugby league, along with Ian Henderson and Andrew Henderson. Henderson played for the Montpellier Agglomération Rugby XIII in the Elite One Championship.

== Representative career ==
The Hendersons are a Scottish family and all three brothers played for Scotland at international level, he won five caps for Scotland, appearing in an international against France in 2007, before appearing in the world cup qualifier against Wales. He featured in all three World Cup Finals matches held in Australia in 2008.

All three brothers featured in the Scotland squad for the 2008 Rugby League World Cup.
