= James Evans (rugby league) =

Australian rugby league footballer

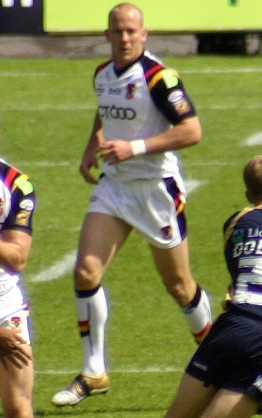

Personal information
- Full name: James Evans
- Born: 5 November 1978 (age 47) Canberra, Australian Capital Territory

Playing information
- Height: 1.89 m (6 ft 2 1/2 in)
- Weight: 89 kg (14 st 0 lb)
- Position: Centre
Club
Years	Team	Pld	T	G	FG	P
2001–04	Canberra Raiders	16	4	0	0	16
2004–06	Huddersfield Giants	54	23	0	0	92
2006	Wakefield Trinity Wildcats	6	3	0	0	12
2007–08	Bradford Bulls	53	22	0	0	88
2009–10	Castleford Tigers	31	16	0	0	64
	Total	160	68	0	0	272

James Evans (born 5 November 1978) is an Australian former professional rugby league footballer who played in the 2000s and 2010s. He played at club level for the Canberra Raiders, Huddersfield Giants, Wakefield Trinity Wildcats, Bradford Bulls and the Castleford Tigers, as a centre. Midway through the 2006 season, he was loaned to the Wakefield Trinity Wildcats and was released from his contract at the Huddersfield Giants at the end of the season. He announced his retirement from the game on 8 November 2010 after failing to recover from a groin injury.

== Background ==
Evans was born in Canberra, Australian Capital Territory, Australia.

== Australia ==
Evans started playing for the Canberra Raiders in 2001. He was injured in season 2002 against Parramatta after a strong start to the season. Evans collided with the goal post when scoring a try and required a complete knee reconstruction of all three ligaments of the knee, seeing him miss 12 months of football.

He was offered an opportunity to play with Huddersfield in the Super League where he played for three seasons. He was then loaned out after rumours of a rift with head coach Jon Sharp. Huddersfield's loss was Wakefields Trinity's gain as Evans secured top flight success with two tries in the Scratch night relegation battle against Castleford.

Evans was then courted by the Bradford Bulls for season 2007 where he was an instant hit scoring 15 tries in 23 games.

== Bradford Bulls ==
Evans signed for Bradford for the 2007 season, and was an ever-present in the centres scoring 15 tries in 23 games. It was announced in September 2008 that Evans would leave the Bulls at the end of 2008 to join Castleford due to salary cap restrictions.

== Statistics ==
=== Club career ===
Year	Club	Apps	Pts	T	G	FG
2001	Canberra Raiders	1	-	-	-	-
2002	Canberra Raiders	7	4	1	-	-
2003	Canberra Raiders	3	4	1	-	-
2004	Canberra Raiders	5	8	2	-	-
2004	Huddersfield Giants	17	44	11	-	-
2005	Huddersfield Giants	21	20	5	-	-
2006	Huddersfield Giants	13	28	7	-	-
2006	Wakefield Trinity Wildcats	6	12	3	-	-
2007	Bradford Bulls	21	48	12	-	-
2008	Bradford Bulls	13	20	5	-	-
2009	Castleford Tigers	21	44	9	-	-
