= Jack Howieson =

Scotland international rugby league footballer

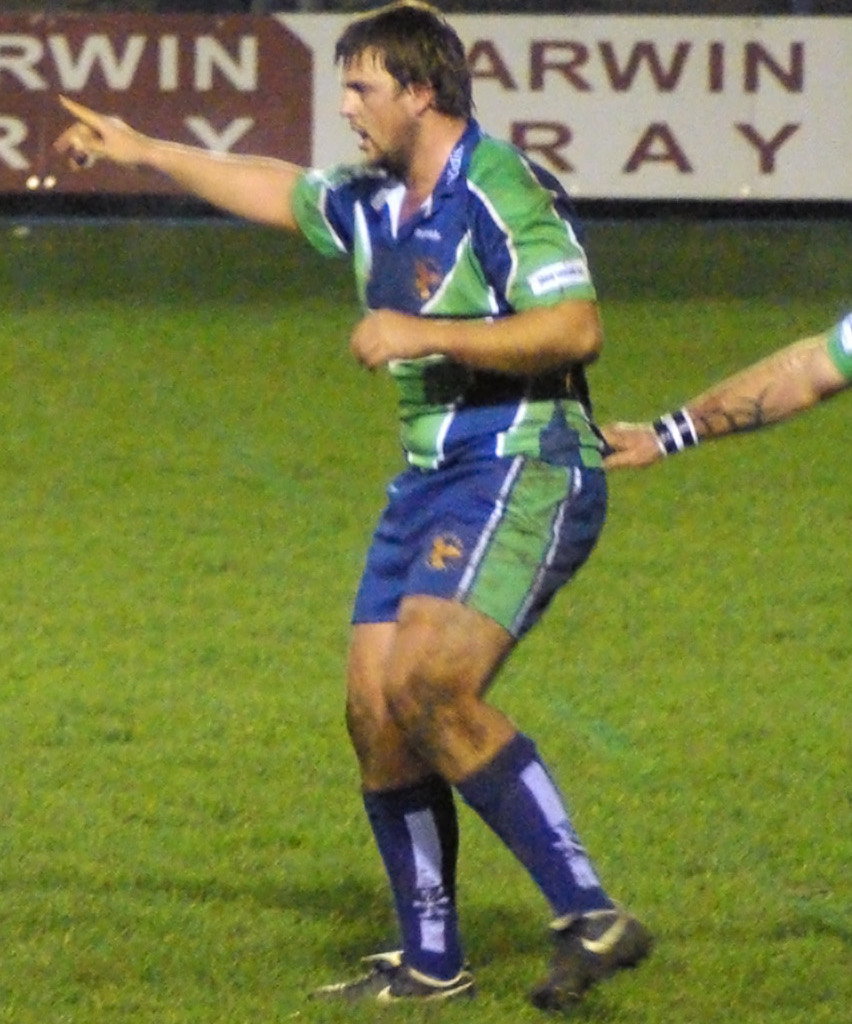

Personal information
- Full name: Jack Howieson
- Born: 28 July 1981 (age 44) Hemel Hempstead, Hertfordshire, England

Playing information
- Height: 190 cm (6 ft 3 in)
- Weight: 18 st 8 lb (118 kg)
- Position: Prop
Club
Years	Team	Pld	T	G	FG	P
2001–13	Sheffield Eagles	274	15	0	1	62
2018	Hemel Stags	10	2	0	0	8
	Total	284	17	0	1	70
Representative
Years	Team	Pld	T	G	FG	P
2003–12	Scotland	11	0	0	0	0

Jack Howieson (born 28 July 1981) is an English former professional rugby league footballer who played in the 2000s and 2010s. He played at representative level for Scotland, and at club level as captain for the Sheffield Eagles, as a prop, and now works in rugby union at sheffield tigers as general manager. Jack has 3 children Chloe, Max and Alana who are involved in rugby.

== Background ==
Jack Howieson was born in Hemel Hempstead, Hertfordshire, England.

In 2023 he was Director of Rugby at Sheffield Tigers RUFC.

== Playing career ==
Howieson began his playing career at Hemel Stags before signing for Sheffield Eagles and making his debut for them in 2001. Howieson played for Scotland at the 2008 Rugby League World Cup, he retired from Rugby on 24 April 2013, just 7 months after captaining Sheffield Eagles to their 20-16 Co-Operative Championship Grand Final win over Featherstone Rovers. In 2018, he returned to Hemel Stags as head coach and a player.
