= Richie Hawkyard =

Scotland international rugby league footballer

Ritchie Hawkyard
Personal information
- Full name: Ritchie Hawkyard
- Born: 21 January 1986 (age 39) Huddersfield, West Yorkshire, England
- Height: 5 ft 8 in (1.73 m)
- Weight: 12 st 0 lb (76 kg)

Playing information
- Position: Fullback, Scrum-half
Club
Years	Team	Pld	T	G	FG	P
2007	Bradford Bulls	3	1	0	0	4
2007–15	Swinton Lions	168	49	53	0	302
2016–18	Keighley Cougars	64	34	0	0	136
2019	Oldham	22	12	0	0	48
2020	Keighley Cougars	1	1	0	0	4
2025	Midlands Hurricanes	3	0	0	0	0
	Total	261	97	53	0	494
Representative
Years	Team	Pld	T	G	FG	P
2007	Scotland	4	0	0	0	0
- Source: As of 10 January 2026

Ritchie Hawkyard (born 21 January 1986), also known by the nicknames of "Hawky", and "Titch", is a Scotland former international rugby league footballer who last played at fullback for Midlands Hurricanes in the RFL League 1.

== Background ==
Hawkyard was born in Huddersfield, West Yorkshire, England.

== Playing career ==
=== Bradford Bulls ===
A product of Bradford Bulls senior academy Hawkyard, 21, was drafted in for Paul Deacon and made his début against Huddersfield Giants in round 14 of 2007 Super League season playing as a stand off.

=== Swinton Lions ===
At the end of the 2007 season having made three appearances for the Bulls, Hawkyard signed for Swinton Lions.

=== Keighley Cougars ===
After nine seasons with Swinton during which he scored 58 tries in 182 appearances for the Lions Hawkyard was captain of the team when helping them to the league 1 leaders in 2011 as well as the League 1 Play off final against Keighley Cougars in 2015, Hawkyard joined Keighley Cougars for the start of the 2016 season.

After being ever present for Keighley in the 2016 season and in his first season helping them win the ipro cup final, Hawkyard missed a number of games of the 2017 season after suffering severe facial injuries in a game against Hunslet at Easter and did not play again until July.

=== Oldham RLFC ===
The end of the 2018 season saw Hawkyard leave Keighley to join Oldham due to the financial uncertainty at the Keighley club. Hawkyard was also Granted a 1-year testimonial starting in 2018 for his services to Rugby League. During the 2019 season Hawkyard made 22 appearances for Oldham scoring 12 tries and helping Oldham win promotion to the Championship with a man-of-the-match performance in the League 1 play-off final against Newcastle Thunder.

=== Keighley Cougars (rejoin) ===
Hawkyard rejoined Keighley in October 2019 on a one-year contract but on 17 December 2019 announced his immediate retirement from the game, only to have a change of heart and rejoin the club in January 2020.

=== Midlands Hurricanes ===
On 22 August 2025 it was reported that he had signed for Midlands Hurricanes in the RFL League 1 until the end of the 2025 season

== Coaching ==
Hawkyard was released by Keighley at the end of the aborted 2020 season and became player-coach at amateur side Newsome Panthers helping them win promotion in his first season at the club.

== Representative ==
He is of Scottish descent and has played for Scotland at international level, playing in a friendly game against France in 2007.
