= Spencer Miller =

Scotland international rugby league footballer

Personal information
- Full name: Spencer Miller

Playing information
- Position: Second-row, Loose forward
Club
Years	Team	Pld	T	G	FG	P
≤2001–11	Whitehaven
Representative
Years	Team	Pld	T	G	FG	P
2003–06	Scotland	5	2	0	0	8

Spencer Miller is a professional rugby league footballer who has played as a second-row or loose forward in the 2000s and the 2010s. He has played at representative level for Scotland, and at club level for Whitehaven.

== International honours ==
Miller won caps for Scotland while at Whitehaven in 2003 against Ireland and France, in 2004 against Wales and Ireland, and in 2006 against Wales.
