= Tupu Ulufale =

Samoan rugby league footballer (born 1987)

Personal information
- Born: 10 May 1987 (age 37)
- Height: 1.85 m (6 ft 1 in)
- Weight: 82 kg (12 st 13 lb)

Playing information
- Position: Wing
Representative
Years	Team	Pld	T	G	FG	P
2008	Samoa

Tupu Ulufale (born 10 May 1987) is a Samoan rugby league footballer who represented Samoa in the 2008 World Cup.

== Playing career ==
He is from the Marist Saints club in Samoa and was the club's MVP in 2008. In 2010 he was one of five domestic players who traveled to New Zealand to be part of the squad that faced the New Zealand national rugby league team in the first ever test match between the two sides. He is a farmer by trade.
