= 2009 in rugby league =

This article contains information on rugby league events played in 2009. The season commenced with a friendly match between Super League clubs Leeds Rhinos and Salford City Reds in the United States in January, and concluded with the Scottish tour of South Africa in December.

== January ==
- 4 Auckland, New Zealand - Rising NRL star Sonny Fai is presumed dead after being swept out to sea at Bethells Beach.

== March ==
- 1st: Leeds, England – The 2009 World Club Challenge is won by Australia's Manly-Warringah Sea Eagles who defeated England's Leeds Rhinos.
- 13th: Australia – The 2009 NRL season begins with the first games of Round 1 being played.
- 13th: England – The 2009 Super League XIV begins with the first games of Round 1 being played.
- 22nd: Maesteg, South Wales – 20-year-old forward Leon Walker collapses and dies on the field in a reserve match between Wakefield Wildcats and Celtic Crusaders.

== April ==
- 6th: France – The 75th anniversary of the creation of the French Rugby League.

== May ==
=== 8th ===
==== City vs. Country Origin ====
Home	Score	Away	Match Information
Home	Score	Away	Date and Time	Venue	Referees	Crowd
Country Origin	18 – 40	City Origin	8 May 2009, 7:35pm	Wade Park, Orange	Gavin Badger; Shayne Hayne	8,226

Teams:

COUNTRY:
1. Luke Patten (1 try), 2. James McManus, 3. Beau Scott, 4. Jamie Lyon (1 try, 3 goals), 5. Joel Monaghan, 6. Terry Campese, 7. Jarrod Mullen
8. Josh Perry, 9. Michael Ennis, 10. Michael Weyman, 11. Andrew Ryan (c), 12. Ben Creagh, 13. Alan Tongue (1 try). Subs: 14. Justin Poore, 15. Chris Heighington, 16. Anthony Tupou, 17. Jamie Soward

CITY:
1. Wade McKinnon, 2. Jarryd Hayne (1 try), 3. Michael Jennings (1 try), 4. Ben Pomeroy, 5. David Williams (1 try), 6. John Sutton, 7. Peter Wallace (1 try, 6 goals)
8. Keith Galloway, 9. Robbie Farah (c), 10. Luke Stuart, 11. Trent Waterhouse, 12. Mark Minichiello (2 tries), 13. Luke O'Donnell. Subs: 14. Craig Wing (1 try), 15. Shane Shackleton, 16. Mark O'Meley, 17. Ryan Hoffman

==== ANZAC Test ====
Home	Score	Away	Match Information
Home	Score	Away	Date and Time	Venue	Referee	Crowd
Australia Kangaroos	38 – 10	New Zealand Kiwis	8 May 2009, 7:45pm	Suncorp Stadium	Richard Silverwood	37,152

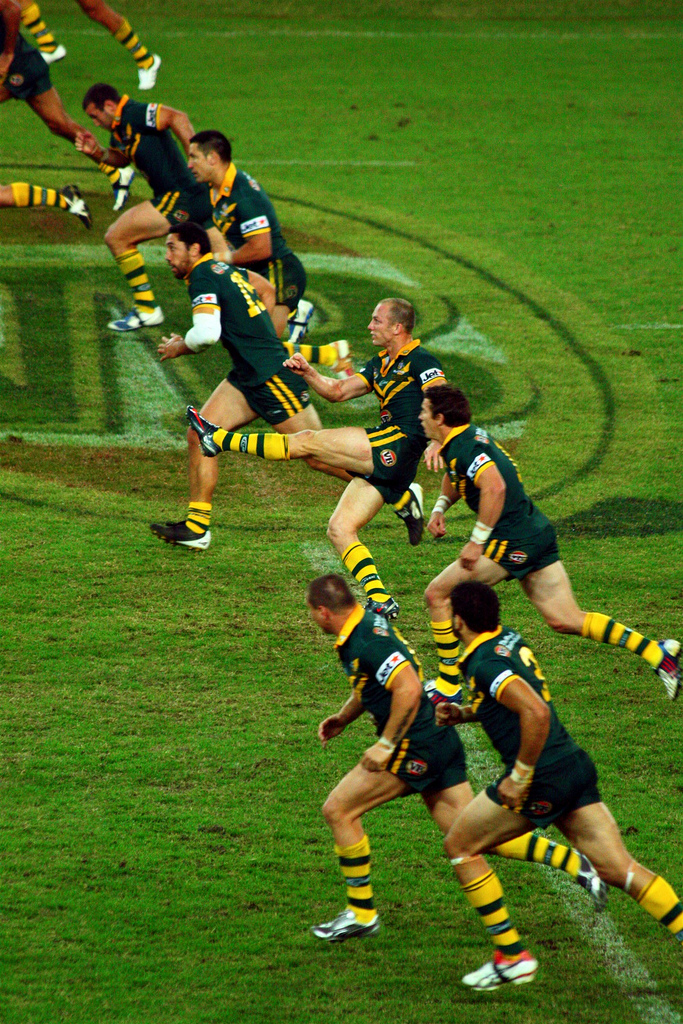
Captain Lockyer kicking off for the Australian side

Teams:

AUSTRALIA:
Billy Slater (Melbourne Storm), Israel Folau (Brisbane Broncos), Greg Inglis (Melbourne Storm), Justin Hodges (Brisbane Broncos), Darius Boyd (St George Illawarra Dragons), Darren Lockyer (captain – Brisbane Broncos), Johnathan Thurston (North Qld Cowboys)
Petero Civoniceva (Penrith Panthers), Cameron Smith (Melbourne Storm), Steve Price (NZ Warriors) Anthony Laffranchi (Gold Coast Titans), Paul Gallen (Cronulla Sharks), Glenn Stewart (Manly Sea Eagles)
Replacements: Kurt Gidley (Newcastle Knights), Brent Kite (Manly Sea Eagles), Luke Bailey (Gold Coast Titans), Anthony Watmough (Manly Sea Eagles)
Coach: Tim Sheens

NEW ZEALAND:
Lance Hohaia (New Zealand Warriors); Sam Perrett (Sydney Roosters), Iosia Soliola (Roosters), Jerome Ropati (Warriors), Manu Vatuvei (Warriors); Nathan Fien (Warriors), Benji Marshall (captain – Wests Tigers)
Roy Asotasi (South Sydney), Dene Halatau (Wests Tigers), Adam Blair (Melbourne Storm); David Fa'alogo (South Sydney), Bronson Harrison (Canberra Raiders); Simon Mannering (Warriors)
Replacements: Greg Eastwood (Canterbury Bulldogs), Jeff Lima (Storm), Jason Nightingale (St George Illawarra), Sika Manu (Storm)
Coach: Stephen Kearney

=== 22 ===
- Bridgend, Wales - The first Super League game to involve no English club is played when Celtic Crusaders play against Catalans Dragons at Brewery Field.

== June ==
=== England vs France ===
On 13 June England played the first rugby league international since the 2008 World Cup against France in Paris' Stade Jean-Bouin.

Teams:

France:
Constant Villegas (Toulouse); Vincent Duport (Catalans Dragons), Sébastien Planas (Toulouse), Jean-Philippe Baile (Catalans Dragons), Frédéric Vaccari (Catalans Dragons); Mickaël Murcia (Limoux), Thomas Bosc (Catalans Dragons); Rémi Casty (Catalans Dragons), Bentley (Catalans Dragons), Jérôme Guisset (Catalans Dragons, capt), Cyril Gossard (Catalans Dragons), Grégory Mounis (Catalans Dragons), Éric Anselme (Toulouse).

Replacements: Sébastien Martins (Pia), Romain Gagliazzo (Carcassonne), William Barthau (Catalans Dragons), Mathieu Griffi (Toulouse).

Coach: Bobbie Goulding

England:
Shaun Briscoe (Hull KR); Peter Fox (Hull KR), Michael Shenton (Castleford), Ryan Atkins (Wakefield), Ryan Hall (Leeds); Danny McGuire (Leeds), Richard Myler (Salford); Adrian Morley (Warrington), Scott Moore (Huddersfield), Jamie Peacock (Leeds, capt), Gareth Hock (Wigan), Ben Westwood (Warrington), Sam Burgess (Bradford).

Replacements: James Roby (St Helens), James Graham (St Helens), Tony Clubb (Harlequins), Eorl Crabtree (Huddersfield).

Coach: Tony Smith

== September ==
- 23rd – Sydney, Australia: The 11th annual Tom Brock Lecture, entitled The Lost Tribes of League – the fate of axed and merged clubs and their fans is delivered by Terry Williams.

== October ==
4- Melbourne Storm defeat Parramatta Eels 23–16 to win the NRL Premiership

=== New Zealand vs. Tonga ===
Wednesday, 14 October 2009

New Zealand	40–24	Tonga
Tries: Benji Marshall (2); Bryson Goodwin (2); Junior Sa'u; Sam Perrett; Nathan Fien; Steve Matai; Goals: Issac Luke (3); Benji Marshall	Report	Tries: Etuate Uaisele (2); Feleti Mateo; Sam Huihahau; Viliami Mataka; Goals: Eddie Paea (2)

Rotorua International Stadium, Rotorua, New Zealand
Attendance: 7,000
Referee: Leon Williamson (NZL)

New Zealand led 24–8 at half-time before Tonga fought back to level the scores at 24–24. New Zealand scored 16 points in a row to win the match 40–24. Four New Zealand players, Bryson Goodwin, Junior Sa'u, Frank-Paul Nuuausala and Jared Waerea-Hargreaves, made their débuts.

=== England vs. Wales ===
Saturday, 17 October 2009

Wales	12–48	England
Tries: Craig Kopczak; Ian Watson; Goals: Lloyd White (2)	Report; Report	Tries: Sam Tomkins (3); Louie McCarthy-Scarsbrook; Sam Burgess; Tom Briscoe (2); Sean O'Loughlin; Adrian Morley; Goals: Paul Sykes (6)

Brewery Field, Bridgend, Wales
Attendance: 3,249
Referee: Thierry Alibert (FRA)
Player of the Match: Sam Tomkins (ENG)

The last time these two sides met, England won 74–0. Wales took an early lead in the match but England were too strong. England's Sam Tomkins scored a hat-trick of tries on his début. England defeated Wales away from home, 48–12.

== November ==
- 14th: Leeds, England – The 2009 Four Nations tournament culminates in a final between Australia and England at Elland Road.

== December ==
In Australia in 2009, rugby league's popularity was confirmed as it had the highest television ratings of any football code.

== Super League ==
The English Super League will continue in 2009 with two more teams than in previous seasons. There used to be a relegation system whereby the lowest team in a season was relegated to National League 1 but this has now been abolished. Leeds Rhinos are the back-to-back defending champions after beating St Helens R.F.C. for the last two seasons.

== National Rugby League ==
The National Rugby League (NRL), contested between 16 teams from Australia and New Zealand, will hold its 102nd season in 2009. The Melbourne Storm won this competition in 2009, winning the final 23–16 against the Parramatta Eels. This title was later stripped from the Storm due to salary cap breaches exposed by the NRL in 2010.

== Four Nations ==
Later in the year, New Zealand, Australia, England and France will compete in a new 4 Nations competition. It replaces the previous Rugby League Tri-Nations, with France making its debut this year. All four teams have been playing regularly for a few years. However, due to France's poor performances at the 2008 Rugby League World Cup they may have to qualify to make this tournament.

== Bartercard Premiership ==
In August this competition will kick off. It started last year and features 6 teams all over New Zealand.
