= 2010 Anzac Test =

Australia	New Zealand
12	8
	1	2	Total
AUS	6	6	12
NZL	0	8	8
- Date: 7 May 2010
- Stadium: AAMI Park
- Location: Melbourne, Australia
- Sam Thaiday
- Referee: Richard Silverwood (England)
- Attendance: 29442

Broadcast partners
- Broadcasters: Nine Network
- Commentators: Ray Warren

The 2010 ANZAC Test was a rugby league test match played between Australia and New Zealand on 7 May 2010. The match coincided with the official opening of AAMI Park in Melbourne. The match was won by Australia with a score of 12–8.

== The teams ==
The squads for each side were announced on 2 May 2010. The selectors for the Australian team made only five changes to the squad that won the final of the 2009 Four Nations. Three of those changes were due to injuries. Notable among the selections was the omission of Brisbane Broncos centre Israel Folau. There had been rumours that Folau was considering moving to the Australian Football League or rugby union; however, the selectors insisted he had been dropped for form reasons. Manly centre Jamie Lyon was called up in Folau's place, and to act as goal-kicker due to Johnathan Thurston's injury-enforced absence. Thurston, the incumbent Australian half back, missed the match with a shoulder injury. He was replaced in the position by Cooper Cronk. Michael Weyman, a prop forward from the St. George Illawarra Dragons was the only member of the squad representing Australia for the first time.

Australia	Position	New Zealand
Billy Slater	Fullback	Lance Hohaia
Brett Morris	Wing	Sam Perrett
Greg Inglis	Centre	Junior Sa'u
Jamie Lyon	Centre	Steve Matai
Jarryd Hayne	Wing	Jason Nightingale
Darren Lockyer (c)	Five-eighth	Benji Marshall (c)
Cooper Cronk	Halfback	Kieran Foran
Petero Civoniceva	Prop	Frank-Paul Nu'uausala
Cameron Smith	Hooker	Issac Luke
David Shillington	Prop	Sam Rapira
Luke Lewis	Second-row	Bronson Harrison
Sam Thaiday	Second-row	Zeb Taia
Paul Gallen	Lock	Adam Blair
Kurt Gidley	Bench	Aaron Heremaia
Josh Perry	Bench	Sika Manu
Anthony Watmough	Bench	Jared Waerea-Hargreaves
Michael Weyman	Bench	Ben Matulino
Tim Sheens	Coach	Stephen Kearney

The New Zealand team included two debutants: Aaron Heremaia and Zeb Taia. Alex Glenn was named in the 18-man squad but was left out of the 17-man team. One of the notable selections was 19-year-old Kieran Foran being named as half back for the first time: Commentators predicted he would be the long-term incumbent in the position, with former Australian halfback Andrew Johns suggesting he could become the best player in the world.

== Opening of AAMI Park ==
The match was the first event to be held at Melbourne's AAMI Park, a rectangular stadium built for rugby league, rugby union and soccer in a city known for its preference for Australian rules football. Despite having been officially sold out wet conditions on the night meant an attendance of 29,442, which nearly satisfied the stadium's 30,050 capacity. The opening ceremony featured the NRL's all-time highest point-scorer, Hazem El Masri kicking a goal.

The National anthem of New Zealand was performed by Elizabeth Marvelly and the National anthem of Australia was performed by Katie Noonan.

=== Match details ===
The first half of the match was low-scoring, as wet conditions caused numerous ball-handling errors. Australia took a 6–0 lead at half-time, after Brett Morris scored a try to add to an earlier penalty goal from Jamie Lyon. Morris' try was scored in the 39th minute of the first half and was the result of a grubber kick from Darren Lockyer. Morris scored a second try shortly into the second half to make the score 12–0. Sam Thaiday set up the try with a flick pass as he was being pushed out of the field of play by New Zealand defenders. New Zealand pulled back two unconverted tries through Jason Nightingale and Junior Sa'u; however, they were not able to make up the 12-point deficit, and Australia won the match 12–8. The match was affected by wet conditions that forced more conservative play. After the match, New Zealand captain Benji Marshall claimed that his side was at least as good as the Australian team, citing that the difference in the scoreline was caused only by Australia's better goalkicking. Australia's Sam Thaiday was named Man of the Match.

Cameron Smith and Zeb Taia were both injured in the course of the match in tackles involving club teammates Adam Blair and Kurt Gidley respectively.

== Match summary ==
7 May 2010, 8:00pm

12	Australia
Tries	2 Morris (39', 48')
Goals	2/3 Lyon (32', 49')
Field goals	
8	New Zealand
Tries	1 Nightingale (68'); 1 Sa'u (78')
Goals	0/2 Luke
Field goals	

Half Time: Australia 6 – 0

Man of the Match: Sam Thaiday

Referee: Richard Silverwood

Venue: AAMI Park, Melbourne

Attendance: 29,442

=== Scoring timeline ===
32nd – Australia 2–0 (Lyon penalty goal)
39th – Australia 6–0 (Morris try)
48th – Australia 12–0 (Morris try; Lyon goal)
68th – Australia 12–4 (Nightingale try)
78th – Australia 12–8 (Sa'u try)
