= 2009 Rugby League Four Nations =

2009 Four Nations
- Number of teams: 4
- Host countries: England; France
- Winner: Australia
- Matches played: 7
- Attendance: 116,089 (16,584 per match)
- Points scored: 280 (40 per match)
- Tries scored: 50 (7.14 per match)
- Top scorer: (Australia) Johnathan Thurston (38)
- Top try scorer: (Australia) Brett Morris (6)

The 2009 Rugby League Four Nations tournament (officially known as the Gillette Four Nations for sponsorship reasons) was the first Rugby League Four Nations since its expansion from the Tri-Nations tournament. Played in England and France over three weeks from Friday, 23 October until Saturday, 14 November, France and England competed for the first time, with Great Britain's permanent split into the home nations' national teams following the 2007 New Zealand All Golds Tour. The tournament culminated in a final between world number 1 side Australia and hosts England. After 60 minutes of highly competitive football, Australia ran away with the match, scoring a barrage of late tries to win 46–16.

The 2009 series was the first of three Four Nations series planned before the 2013 Rugby League World Cup, with the venues rotating between Europe and the South Pacific. The RLIF also stated that the next Four Nations would be held in 2010.

== Background ==
The Four Nations is run in partnership between the Australian Rugby League, Rugby Football League and New Zealand Rugby League representing the top three nations in the sport: Australia, England and New Zealand. A fourth partner, Fédération Française de Rugby à XIII, accepted an invitation to enter France in the inaugural 2009 tournament.

== Teams ==
Each team was to play the other three once during the round robin tournament. The top two finishing teams would then contest the final.

Team	Nickname	Coach	Captain	RLIF Rank
Australia	The Kangaroos	Tim Sheens	Darren Lockyer	1
New Zealand	The Kiwis	Stephen Kearney	Benji Marshall	2
England	The Lions	Tony Smith	Jamie Peacock	3
France	Les Tricolores	Bobbie Goulding	Olivier Elima	5

=== Squads ===
Each nation was to choose a 24-man squad in order to participate for the Four Nations.

==== Australia ====
Australian coach Tim Sheens' squad for the tournament was:

No.	Name	State	Club
661	Darren Lockyer (c)	QLD	Brisbane Broncos
687	Nathan Hindmarsh	NSW	Parramatta Eels
691	Petero Civoniceva	QLD	Penrith Panthers
715	Luke Lewis	NSW	Penrith Panthers
716	Trent Waterhouse	NSW	Penrith Panthers
731	Johnathan Thurston	QLD	North Queensland Cowboys
734	Jarryd Hayne	NSW	Parramatta Eels
735	Justin Hodges	QLD	Brisbane Broncos
737	Greg Inglis	QLD	Melbourne Storm
738	Cameron Smith (vc)	QLD	Melbourne Storm
739	Sam Thaiday	QLD	Brisbane Broncos
744	Cooper Cronk	QLD	Melbourne Storm
747	Kurt Gidley	NSW	Newcastle Knights
748	Ryan Hoffman	NSW	Melbourne Storm
750	Paul Gallen	NSW	Cronulla-Sutherland Sharks
751	Billy Slater	QLD	Melbourne Storm
758	Anthony Watmough	NSW	Manly Warringah Sea Eagles
761	Ben Hannant	QLD	Bulldogs
762	Brett Morris*	NSW	St George Illawarra Dragons
763	Brett White	NSW	Melbourne Storm
764	Robbie Farah	NSW	Wests Tigers
765	David Shillington	QLD	Canberra Raiders
766	Michael Jennings	NSW	Penrith Panthers
767	Josh Morris	NSW	Bulldogs

*Replaced originally selected Israel Folau who withdrew due to injury.

Of the twenty four players, twenty three were Australian born while one was Fijian born.

==== New Zealand ====
Coach: (New Zealand) Stephen Kearney

Of the twenty four players, nineteen were New Zealand born while four were Australian born and one was Tongan born.

Club Team	Players
Canberra Raiders	Bronson Harrison
Canterbury Bulldogs	Greg Eastwood^{1} and Bryson Goodwin
Manly Warringah Sea Eagles	Kieran Foran, Steve Matai and Jared Waerea-Hargreaves
Melbourne Storm	Adam Blair (vc) and Jeff Lima
Newcastle Knights	Junior Sa'u
New Zealand Warriors	Lance Hohaia, Kevin Locke and Ben Matulino
Parramatta Eels	Krisnan Inu and Fuifui Moimoi
Penrith Panthers	Frank Pritchard
South Sydney Rabbitohs	Issac Luke and Eddy Pettybourne^{2}
St George Illawarra Dragons	Nathan Fien and Jason Nightingale
Sydney Roosters	Frank-Paul Nuuausala, Sam Perrett and Iosia Soliola
Wests Tigers	Benji Marshall (c)
Wigan Warriors	Thomas Leuluai^{3}

^{1} Ruled out of the rest of the series on 5 November after breaking his hand in the Round two victory over France.

^{2} Registered as a member of the squad before the tournament started but this was not revealed to the media until he was called to Europe from Australia by the Kiwis on 25 October.

^{3} The only non National Rugby League player in the squad.

==== England ====
Coach: (England) Tony Smith

All twenty four players were English born.

Club Team	Players
Bradford Bulls	Sam Burgess and Paul Sykes
Castleford Tigers	Michael Shenton
Huddersfield Giants	Eorl Crabtree and Scott Moore
Hull F.C.	Tom Briscoe^{1}
Hull Kingston Rovers	Shaun Briscoe and Peter Fox
Leeds Rhinos	Jamie Peacock (c), Ryan Hall, Danny McGuire, Kevin Sinfield and Lee Smith
Salford City Reds	Richard Myler
St. Helens	Kyle Eastmond, James Graham, James Roby and Jon Wilkin
Warrington Wolves	Chris Bridge, Garreth Carvell, Adrian Morley and Ben Westwood
Wests Tigers	Gareth Ellis^{2}
Wigan Warriors	Sam Tomkins

^{1} Replaced originally selected Sean O'Loughlin who withdrew due to injury.
^{2} The only non Super League player in the squad.

==== France ====
Coach: (England) Bobbie Goulding

Of the twenty seven players, eighteen were French born while three were Australian born, three New Zealand born, one Moroccan born and one New Caledonia born.

Club Team	Players
AS Carcassonne	Romain Gagliazzo, Christophe Moly and Teddy Saddaoui
Catalans Dragons	Olivier Elima (c), Nicholas Piquemol, Andrew Bentley, Kane Bentley, Jean-Philippe Baile, Thomas Bosc, ~~Rémi Casty~~, Vincent Duport, Jamal Fakir, David Ferriol, Cyril Gossard, Dimitri Pelo, Sébastien Martins, Sebastien Raguin, Cyril Stacul, Clint Greenshields, Julien Touxagas, Frédéric Vaccari and ~~Casey McGuire~~
Pia Donkeys	Maxime Grésèque
Toulouse Olympique	Mathieu Griffi and Constant Villegas
Lézignan Sangliers	James Wynne
Villeneuve Leopards	Artie Shead

- Casey McGuire was initially named in the squad but withdrew after "an exhausting Super League season". He cannot be replaced.
- Rémi Casty suffered a series-ending broken hand in the first match against England.
- Artie Shead, James Wynne, Andrew Bentley and Nicholas Piquemol were added to the squad for the match vs New Zealand after several squad members came down with Swine Flu.

== Venues ==
There were several venues used during the tournament throughout England and France.

Doncaster	London	Wigan
Keepmoat Stadium	Twickenham Stoop	DW Stadium
Capacity: 15,231	Capacity: 14,816	Capacity: 25,138
Toulouse	Paris	Huddersfield
Stade Ernest-Wallon	Stade Sébastien Charléty	Galpharm Stadium
Capacity: 19,500	Capacity: 20,000	Capacity: 24,500

=== Final ===
The Four Nations Final was played at the Elland Road stadium in Leeds, England.

Leeds
Elland Road
Capacity: 40,242
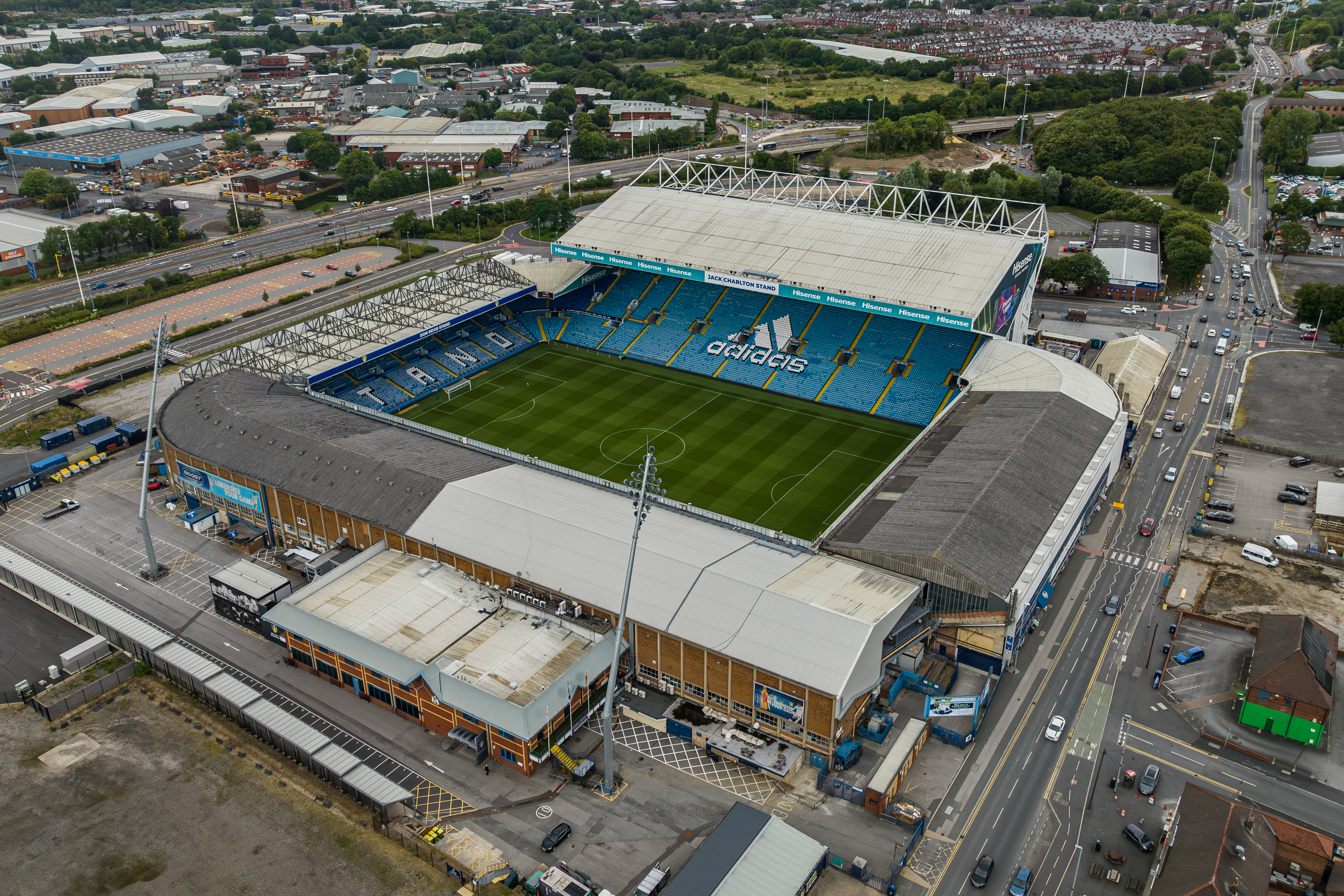

== Referees ==
Four referees were nominated for the tournament by the governing bodies of the participating teams. One from each of the participating nations. The nominated referees were:

- Thierry Alibert (France)
- Steve Ganson (England)
- Shayne Hayne (Australia)
- Leon Williamson (New Zealand)

== Pre-tournament matches ==
Before the series, New Zealand and England played additional Tests against Tonga and Wales respectively.

=== New Zealand vs Tonga ===
14 October 2009

New Zealand	40 – 24	Tonga
Tries: Benji Marshall (2); Bryson Goodwin (2); Junior Sa'u; Sam Perrett; Nathan Fien; Steve Matai; Goals: Issac Luke (3); Benji Marshall (1)	Report	Tries: Etuate Uaisele (2); Feleti Mateo; Sam Huihahau; Viliami Mataka Goals: Eddie Paea (2)

Rotorua International Stadium, Rotorua, New Zealand
Attendance: 8,000
Referee: Leon Williamson (New Zealand)
Player of the Match: Benji Marshall

New Zealand led 24–8 at half-time before Tonga fought back to level the scores at 24-24. New Zealand went on to score 16 unanswered points to win the match 40–24.

=== Wales vs England ===
17 October 2009

Wales	12 – 48	England
Tries: Craig Kopczak; Ian Watson Goals: Lloyd White (2)	Report	Tries: Sam Tomkins (3); Tom Briscoe (2); Louie McCarthy-Scarsbrook; Sam Burgess; Sean O'Loughlin; Adrian Morley; Goals: Paul Sykes (6)

Brewery Field, Bridgend, Wales
Attendance: 3,249
Referee: Thierry Alibert (France)
Player of the Match: Sam Tomkins

England lead Wales 20-12 approaching the hour, before racking up 28 points in the last quarter.

== Results ==
=== Standings ===
2009 Four Nations
Pos	Team	Pld	W	D	L	PF	PA	PD	Pts	Qualification
1	Australia	3	2	1	0	88	40	+48	5	Qualification for Final
2	England	3	2	0	1	70	50	+20	4	Qualification for Final
3	New Zealand	3	1	1	1	94	52	+42	3	
4	France	3	0	0	3	28	138	−110	0	

Source: Gillette Four Nations

=== Round one ===
==== England vs France ====
Friday, 23 October
2000 BST

England	34 – 12	France
Tries: Richard Myler (2); Lee Smith; Kevin Sinfield; Ryan Hall; Tom Briscoe; Goals: Kevin Sinfield (5)	Report; Team lists	Tries: Vincent Duport; Kane Bentley Goals: Thomas Bosc (2)

Keepmoat Stadium, Doncaster, England
Attendance: 11,529
Referee: Leon Williamson (New Zealand)
Player of the Match: Gareth Ellis

After trailing 12–4 at half-time, England scored 30 consecutive points to defeat France 34–12, who were coached by former Great Britain half, Bobbie Goulding.

FB	1	Shaun Briscoe
RW	2	Tom Briscoe
RC	3	Lee Smith
LC	4	Michael Shenton
LW	5	Ryan Hall
SO	6	Danny McGuire
SH	7	Richard Myler
PR	8	Jamie Peacock (c)
HK	9	Scott Moore
PR	10	Adrian Morley
SR	11	Gareth Ellis
SR	12	Sam Burgess
LF	13	Kevin Sinfield
Substitutions:
BE	14	James Graham
BE	15	James Roby
BE	16	Ben Westwood
BE	17	Kyle Eastmond
Coach:
(Australia) Tony Smith

FB	1	Clint Greenshields
RW	2	Vincent Duport
RC	3	Jean-Philippe Baile
LC	4	Sebastien Raguin
LW	5	Dimitri Pelo
SO	6	Thomas Bosc
SH	7	James Wynne
PR	8	David Ferriol
HK	9	Kane Bentley
PR	10	Rémi Casty
SR	11	Olivier Elima (c)
SR	12	Julien Touxagas
LF	13	Jamal Fakir
Substitutions:
BE	14	Constant Villegas
BE	15	Romain Gagliazzo
BE	16	Sébastien Martins
BE	17	Teddy Saddaoui
Coach:
(England) Bobbie Goulding

==== New Zealand vs Australia ====
For Australia Ben Hannant, Brett Morris and Brett White were selected to make their debuts. Petero Civoniceva was selected despite not having played any football since he injured his leg in game 2 of the 2009 State of Origin series in June.

When Australian captain Darren Lockyer took the field for this match, he surpassed Mal Meninga's record for most international caps for the Kangaroos. After 6–6 at half-time, Australia quickly went to a 14–6 lead before New Zealand scored fourteen points in a row to make it 14–20. Australia's Cameron Smith scored a try and Johnathan Thurston made the conversion to level the scores with less than five minutes left to play. The score finished at 20-20. The crowd of 12,360 at Twickenham Stoop stadium set a new attendance ground record for a rugby league match.

Saturday, 24 October
2000 BST

New Zealand	20 – 20	Australia
Tries: Frank-Paul Nuuausala; Junior Sa'u; Lance Hohaia; Frank Pritchard; Goals: Bryson Goodwin (2)	Report; Team lists	Tries: Brett Morris; Johnathan Thurston; Cameron Smith Goals: Johnathan Thurston (4)

Twickenham Stoop, London, England
Attendance: 12,360
Referee: Steve Ganson (England)
Player of the Match: Lance Hohaia

FB	1	Lance Hohaia
RW	2	Sam Perrett
RC	3	Steve Matai
LC	4	Junior Sa'u
LW	5	Bryson Goodwin
SO	6	Benji Marshall (c)
SH	7	Nathan Fien
PR	8	Jeff Lima
HK	9	Issac Luke
PR	10	Fuifui Moimoi
SR	11	Bronson Harrison
SR	12	Frank Pritchard
LF	13	Adam Blair
Substitutions:
BE	14	Thomas Leuluai
BE	15	Frank-Paul Nu'uausala
BE	16	Iosia Soliola
BE	17	Jared Waerea-Hargreaves
Coach:
(New Zealand) Stephen Kearney

FB	1	Billy Slater
RW	2	Brett Morris
RC	3	Greg Inglis
LC	4	Justin Hodges
LW	5	Jarryd Hayne
SO	6	Darren Lockyer (c)
SH	7	Johnathan Thurston
PR	8	Ben Hannant
HK	9	Cameron Smith
PR	10	Petero Civoniceva
SR	11	Trent Waterhouse
SR	12	Ryan Hoffman
LF	13	Anthony Watmough
Substitutions:
BE	14	Brett White
BE	15	Sam Thaiday
BE	16	Paul Gallen
BE	17	Kurt Gidley
Coach:
(Australia) Tim Sheens

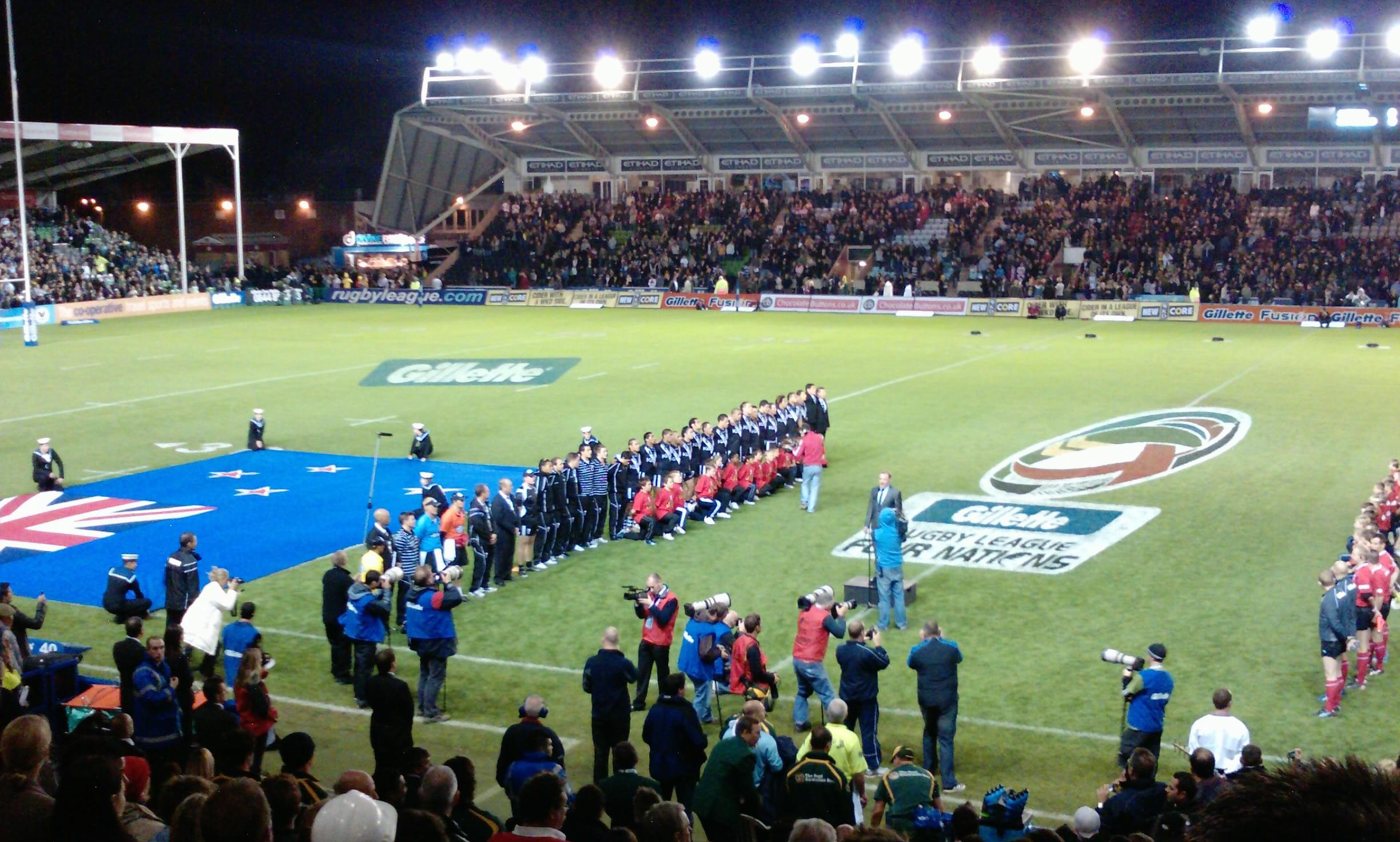
The national anthems at the first game between Australia and New Zealand

=== Round two ===
==== England vs Australia ====
Changes made to the Australian side included the removal of Sam Thaiday, Ryan Hoffman, Trent Waterhouse and Kurt Gidley. Taking their places were débutants Luke Lewis and David Shillington as well as Robbie Farah and also Nathan Hindmarsh, making his test football comeback. Australian captain Darren Lockyer equalled Ken Irvine's record of 33 test tries for Australia by scoring in this match. On a warm and sunny day, the Kangaroos went into half-time 26-0 up and after Australia defeated England 52–4 in their previous meeting in last year's Rugby League World Cup, the English looked set for another thrashing. However, England made an ambitious fight-back in the second half but, keeping Australia scoreless to lose by a more respectable margin of 26–16. Towards the end of the match, Johnathan Thurston was sent to the sin bin.

Saturday, 31 October
1430 GMT

England	16 – 26	Australia
Tries: Sam Burgess; Gareth Ellis; Lee Smith Goals: Kevin Sinfield (1); Lee Smith (1)	Report	Tries: Billy Slater (2); Darren Lockyer; Greg Inglis; Brett Morris; Goals: Johnathan Thurston (3)

DW Stadium, Wigan, England
Attendance: 23,122
Referee: Steve Ganson (England)
Player of the Match: Greg Inglis

FB	1	Shaun Briscoe
RW	2	Tom Briscoe
RC	3	Lee Smith
LC	4	Michael Shenton
LW	5	Ryan Hall
SO	6	Danny McGuire
SH	7	Sam Tomkins
PR	8	Adrian Morley
HK	9	James Roby
PR	10	James Graham
SR	11	Jamie Peacock (c)
SR	12	Gareth Ellis
LF	13	Kevin Sinfield
Substitutions:
BE	14	Eorl Crabtree
BE	15	Sam Burgess
BE	16	Ben Westwood
BE	17	Kyle Eastmond
Coach:
(Australia) Tony Smith

FB	1	Billy Slater
RW	2	Brett Morris
RC	3	Greg Inglis
LC	4	Justin Hodges
LW	5	Jarryd Hayne
SO	6	Darren Lockyer (c)
SH	7	Johnathan Thurston
PR	8	Ben Hannant
HK	9	Cameron Smith
PR	10	Petero Civoniceva
SR	11	Anthony Watmough
SR	12	Paul Gallen
LF	13	Nathan Hindmarsh
Substitutions:
BE	14	Brett White
BE	15	Luke Lewis
BE	16	David Shillington
BE	17	Robbie Farah
Coach:
(Australia) Tim Sheens

=== New Zealand vs France ===
New Zealand were leading 16–6 at half-time. France got to within 4 points of New Zealand at 16-12 before New Zealand scored 46 points in a row to comfortably win 62–12. New Zealand's Bryson Goodwin scored 22 individual points and Sam Perrett scored a hat-trick of tries. This loss ended the French hopes of making the finals.

Saturday, 31 October
1800 CET

France	12 – 62	New Zealand
Tries: Sébastien Martins; James Wynne Goals: Thomas Bosc (2)	Report	Tries: Sam Perrett (3); Lance Hohaia (2); Jared Waerea-Hargreaves (2); Benji Marshall; Frank-Paul Nuuausala; Junior Sa'u; Bryson Goodwin; Goals: Bryson Goodwin (9)

Stade Ernest-Wallon, Toulouse, France
Attendance: 12,412
Referee: Shayne Hayne (Australia)
Player of the Match: Sam Perrett

FB	1	Constant Villegas
RW	2	Nicholas Piquemol
RC	3	Teddy Saddaoui
LC	4	Vincent Duport
LW	5	Frédéric Vaccari
SO	6	Thomas Bosc
SH	7	James Wynne
PR	8	Artie Shead
HK	9	Kane Bentley
PR	10	Mathieu Griffi
SR	11	Olivier Elima (c)
SR	12	Julien Touxagas
LF	13	Jamal Fakir
Substitutions:
BE	14	Christophe Moly
BE	15	Andrew Bentley
BE	16	Sébastien Martins
BE	17	Romain Gagliazzo
Coach:
(England) Bobbie Goulding

FB	1	Lance Hohaia
RW	2	Sam Perrett
RC	3	Steve Matai
LC	4	Junior Sa'u
LW	5	Bryson Goodwin
SO	6	Benji Marshall (c)
SH	7	Nathan Fien
PR	8	Frank-Paul Nu'uausala
HK	9	Thomas Leuluai
PR	10	Fuifui Moimoi
SR	11	Adam Blair
SR	12	Frank Pritchard
LF	13	Iosia Soliola
Substitutions:
BE	14	Issac Luke
BE	15	Greg Eastwood
BE	16	Ben Matulino
BE	17	Jared Waerea-Hargreaves
Coach:
(New Zealand) Stephen Kearney

The French team lining up before the match.

=== Round three ===
==== Australia vs France ====
The Kangaroos had not played in Paris since 1994. They went into the match having won their last 14 matches against France. Due to French laws prohibiting the use of alcohol advertising in sport, the Australian jerseys' usual Victoria Bitter logo was replaced by one for Movember. Debuting for Australia were Brett Morris' twin brother Josh Morris and New South Wales State of Origin centre Michael Jennings. By playing in this match, Darren Lockyer surpassed Clive Churchill's record for most games as Australian captain. For the first 20 minutes the contest was quite even, being played at both ends of the field with both sides getting and conceding penalties. It was the Australians who scored first when debutant Michael Jennings dummied his way through the defence from 20 metres out to score out wide. Johnathan Thurston's conversion attempt missed, so France were down 4 nil with 18 minutes of the first half remaining. Jennings also scored the second try of the match in the 27th minute when Lockyer threw a cutout pass to him in front of France's line. Thurston again failed to add the extras, so the score remained at 8 nil. The score did not change from then till half time, with both sides' defence holding each other's attacking opportunities out.

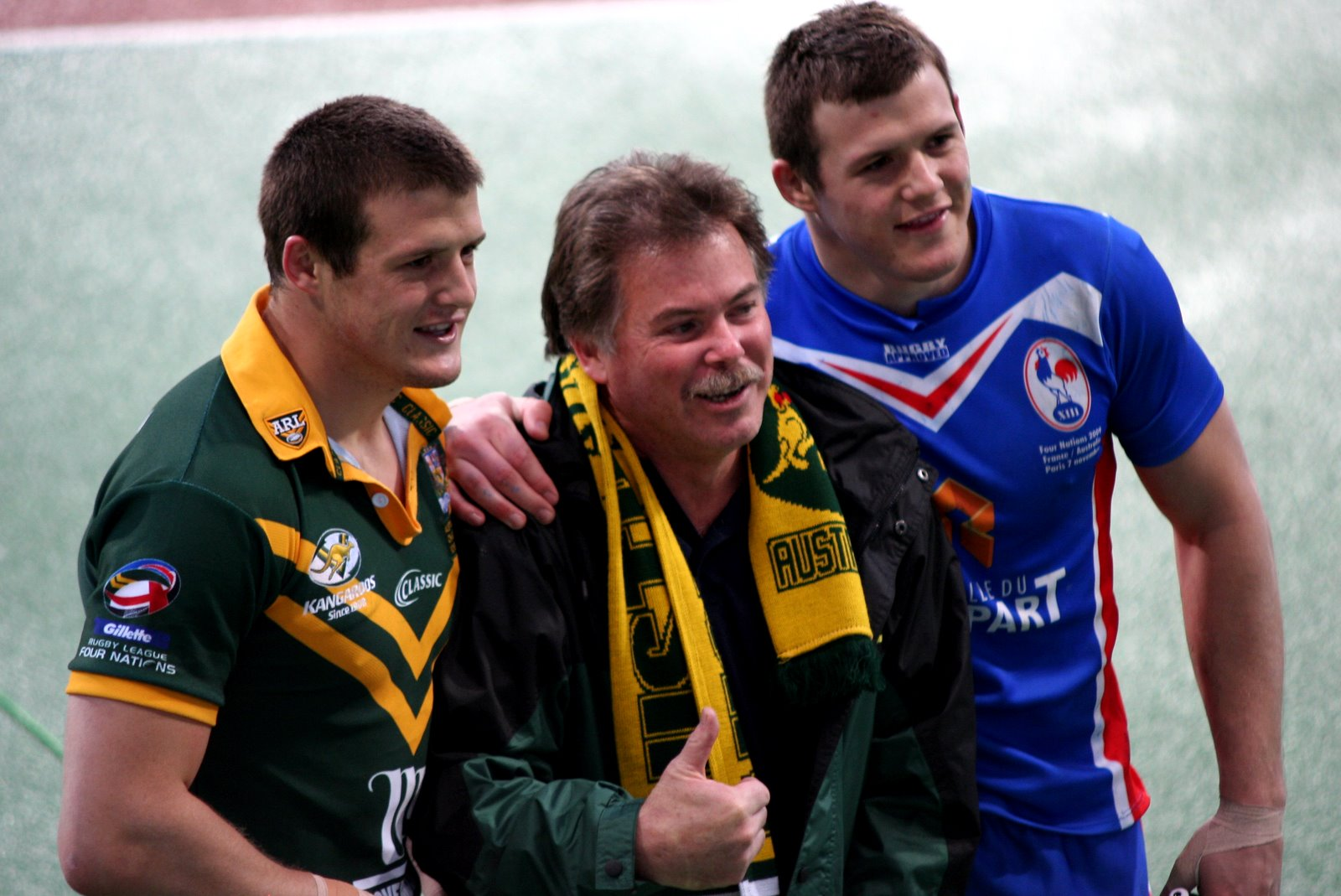
The Morris twins celebrate their team's win with father Steve.

After receiving France's kick-off and making their way up-field with the help of a penalty, the Australians scored in only the 2nd minute of the half when Luke Lewis powered his way through the defence from about 12 metres out. With Cooper Cronk on the field instead of Johnathan Thurston, Kurt Gidley was given kicking duties and converted the try, pushing Australia's lead out to 14 nil. In the 45th minute the Kangaroos scored again after a Cooper Cronk 40/20 kick put them in an attacking position and they moved the ball out to Brett Morris' wing where he dived over untouched in the corner. Gidley's sideline conversion attempt missed so the score was 18 nil. Morris got his second try just a few minutes later when Darren Lockyer kicked ahead for him from 35 metres out. Gidley kicked the extras so Australia's lead was 24 nil. the Kangaroos continued to dominate possession and in the 56th minute Jennings got his hat-trick with a long-range try when he regathered a French dropped ball 30 metres out from Australia's line. Jennings thus became the 4th Kangaroo since Lionel Morgan in 1960, Brad Mackay in 1990 and David Williams in 2008 to score a hat-trick on debut for Australia. Thurston, back on the field kicked his first successful goal of the match to push the score out to 30 nil with over 25 minutes of play to go. In the 61st minute France made the most of an attacking opportunity when Tomas Bosc kicked over the Australian defence where Olivier Elima leapt for it, coming down with the ball over the line. Bosc's conversion attempt missed so the score was 30–4 with 18 minutes remaining. Josh Morris then got a try at the 69-minute mark when he received the ball from his twin brother Brett after the Australians had kept the ball alive. Thurston kicked the extras so the score was 36–4. Josh Morris then got his second try a little over 2 minutes later when the Australians moved the ball out to his wing from a scrum win 30 metres out. Thurston's successful conversion made the score 42-4 and this is what it would be at the final whistle.

The victory for Australia meant they would face the winner of the match between New Zealand and England to be played in Huddersfield later that evening.

Saturday, 7 November
1530 CET

France	4 – 42	Australia
Tries: Olivier Elima Goals:	Report	Tries: Michael Jennings (3); Brett Morris (2); Josh Morris (2); Luke Lewis; Goals: Johnathan Thurston (3); Kurt Gidley (2)

Stade Sébastien Charléty, Paris, France
Attendance: 6,234
Referee: Leon Williamson (New Zealand)
Player of the Match: Michael Jennings

FB	1	Clint Greenshields
RW	2	Vincent Duport
RC	3	Dimitri Pelo
LC	4	Teddy Sadaoui
LW	5	Sébastien Raguin
SO	6	Thomas Bosc
SH	7	James Wynne
PR	8	David Ferriol
HK	9	Kane Bentley
PR	10	Artie Shead
SR	11	Olivier Elima (c)
SR	12	Julien Touxagas
LF	13	Andrew Bentley
Substitutions:
BE	14	Christophe Moly
BE	15	Constant Villegas
BE	16	Sébastien Martins
BE	17	Mathieu Griffi
Coach:
(England) Bobbie Goulding

FB	1	Kurt Gidley
RW	2	Brett Morris
RC	3	Josh Morris
LC	4	Michael Jennings
LW	5	Jarryd Hayne
SO	6	Darren Lockyer (c)
SH	7	Johnathan Thurston
PR	8	Ben Hannant
HK	9	Robbie Farah
PR	10	Petero Civoniceva
SR	11	Trent Waterhouse
SR	12	Ryan Hoffman
LF	13	Nathan Hindmarsh
Substitutions:
BE	14	Cooper Cronk
BE	15	Luke Lewis
BE	16	David Shillington
BE	17	Sam Thaiday
Coach:
(Australia) Tim Sheens

==== New Zealand vs England ====
The last time these two sides met was in the 2008 World Cup when they played each other for the chance to face Australia in the final. On that occasion New Zealand won, sending England back home. This time they were playing for the chance to face Australia in the Four Nations final. New Zealand could draw and still make the final, while England needed to win to advance. In all of England's prior games, they had lost the first half but had won and not conceded a point in the second half. For this match England coach Tony Smith dropped Danny McGuire, Lee Smith and Tom Briscoe in favour of Peter Fox, Chris Bridge and Jon Wilkin. For New Zealand, Greg Eastwood and Steve Matai were out with injury so Jeff Lima was recalled and 19-year-old Kieran Foran was brought in to make his international debut ahead of Krisnan Inu.

England got the first points of the match when they attacked up the middle, Sam Burgess spinning out of a tackle to send Kyle Eastmond over under the black dot just on 9 minutes. Sinfield's conversion from right in front was successful so England were out to a 6 nil lead. New Zealand responded 5 minutes later, moving the ball out wide to Bryson Goodwin's wing where he dived over in the corner. He couldn't convert his own try though, so the score was left at 6–4. In the 29th minute New Zealand were awarded a penalty right in front of the goal-posts and took the two points, leveling the score at 6 all. Six minutes later England were up at the Kiwis' end of the field again, attacking the line, when Sam Tomkins kicked across-field to Peter Fox's corner where the winger dived on the ball. Sinfield kicked the extras from the sideline so England were again a converted try in front with just over 4 minutes remaining. England continued dominating field position and scored again in the 39th minute from a scrum win near England's line, the ball going through the hands out to Peter Fox to score his second. Sinfield again added the extras, pushing England's lead out to 18–6.

New Zealand opened the scoring after just a minute and a half into the second hand when at the halfway line Isaac Luke made a break from dummy-half, his offload finding support players who got the ball out to Ben Matulino who scored. Bryson Goodwin's kick added the extras, bringing the Kiwis back within a converted try, trailing 18–12. The play for the next half-hour went from end to end, with both teams getting good attacking opportunities but both teams' defences holding them out. Then when England were close to New Zealand's line they were awarded a penalty for ruck interference and with less than 10 minutes remaining, decided to take the kick for an 8-point lead. Sinfield's kick was successful so the score was 20–12 in favour of the home team. England were able to hold New Zealand out for the remaining minutes of the match and so earned a place in the final. Kevin Sinfield, in the unfamiliar position of hooker was named man-of-the-match.

Saturday, 7 November
1800 GMT

England	20 – 12	New Zealand
Tries: Peter Fox (2); Kyle Eastmond; Goals: Kevin Sinfield (4)	Report	Tries: Bryson Goodwin; Ben Matulino; Goals: Bryson Goodwin (2)

Galpharm Stadium, Huddersfield, England
Attendance: 19,390
Referee: Thierry Alibert (France)
Player of the Match: Kevin Sinfield

FB	1	Shaun Briscoe
RW	2	Peter Fox
RC	3	Chris Bridge
LC	4	Michael Shenton
LW	5	Ryan Hall
SO	6	Sam Tomkins
SH	7	Kyle Eastmond
PR	8	Adrian Morley
HK	9	Kevin Sinfield
PR	10	James Graham
SR	11	Jamie Peacock (c)
SR	12	Gareth Ellis
LF	13	Sam Burgess
Substitutions:
BE	14	Eorl Crabtree
BE	15	Jon Wilkin
BE	16	Ben Westwood
BE	17	James Roby
Coach:
(Australia) Tony Smith

FB	1	Lance Hohaia
RW	2	Sam Perrett
RC	3	Kieran Foran
LC	4	Junior Sa'u
LW	5	Bryson Goodwin
SO	6	Benji Marshall (c)
SH	7	Nathan Fien
PR	8	Frank-Paul Nu'uausala
HK	9	Thomas Leuluai
PR	10	Fuifui Moimoi
SR	11	Iosia Soliola
SR	12	Frank Pritchard
LF	13	Adam Blair
Substitutions:
BE	14	Issac Luke
BE	15	Jeff Lima
BE	16	Ben Matulino
BE	17	Jared Waerea-Hargreaves
Coach:
(New Zealand) Stephen Kearney

=== Final ===
The Australian team for the final had the Queensland team's halves pairing, front row, centre pairing and fullback, while both wingers, the whole back row, three-quarters of the bench and the coach were New South Walshmen.

Saturday, 14 November
1930 GMT

England	16 – 46	Australia
Tries: Sam Burgess (2); Peter Fox Goals: Kevin Sinfield (2/3)		Tries: Billy Slater (3); Brett Morris (2); Greg Inglis; Jarryd Hayne; Cameron Smith; Goals: Johnathan Thurston (7/9)

Elland Road, Leeds, England
Attendance: 31,042
Referee: Leon Williamson (New Zealand)
Player of the Match: Johnathan Thurston

England	Position	Australia
Shaun Briscoe	FB	Billy Slater
Peter Fox	WG	Brett Morris
Chris Bridge	CE	Greg Inglis
Michael Shenton	CE	Justin Hodges
Ryan Hall	WG	Jarryd Hayne
Sam Tomkins	FE	Darren Lockyer (c)
Kyle Eastmond	HB	Johnathan Thurston
Adrian Morley	PR	Ben Hannant
Kevin Sinfield	HK	Cameron Smith
James Graham	PR	Petero Civoniceva
Jamie Peacock (c)	SR	Luke Lewis
Gareth Ellis	SR	Paul Gallen
Sam Burgess	LK	Nathan Hindmarsh
Eorl Crabtree	Int	Kurt Gidley
Jon Wilkin	Int	Brett White
Ben Westwood	Int	Anthony Watmough
James Roby	Int	Sam Thaiday
Tony Smith	Coach	Tim Sheens

By playing in this match, Darren Lockyer became the first Australian in history to play in fifty international matches for his country. In addition, teammate and fellow Queenslander, Petero Civoniceva became the most-capped forward, breaking Johnny Raper's record by earning his 40th cap.

It took Australia till the ninth minute to cross England's line. Quick passing out to Brett Morris on the right wing saw him dive over in the corner, but the video referee ruled that he'd lost control of the ball in the grounding of it so no try was allowed. In England's very next set of six, they had reached Australia's half when NRL-bound loose forward Sam Burgess charged through the Kangaroos' defence, running forty-five metres and dummying past the fullback to score under the posts. Sinfield's conversion put England ahead 6 nil after eleven minutes of play. In the fourteenth minute Australia responded: a cut-out pass from Johnathan Thurston on England's try-line was flicked on by Justin Hodges' fingertips to Morris, who this time got his try. Thurston kicked the conversion from near the sideline so the scores were level at 6 all. A few minutes later England were back attacking Australia's line, when on the final tackle Eastmond put a kick up to his right winger Peter Fox, who beat Jarryd Hayne in the leap for the ball to come down with the try, putting the home team back in front. Sinfield missed the conversion attempt so the score was 10–6 with twenty minutes of the first half remaining. Five minutes later Hayne made a good break from half way, kicking ahead for Greg Inglis to chase through and ground the ball. The video referee checked Inglis' grounding and gave him the benefit of the doubt. Thurston kicked the extras so Australia had the lead again 12–10 with fourteen minutes of the first half left. At the thirty-minute mark England were penalised right in front of their goal posts and Australia opted to take the kick, Thurston's boot pushing Australia's lead out to four. No further points were scored in the first half so they went into the break at England 10, Australia 14.

After ten minutes of sustained pressure on Australia's defence England were through, Burgess again charging over under the posts from close range. Sinfield's kick added the Extras so once again England had the lead at 16–14. A little over three minutes later it was Australia attacking England's line when their fullback Billy Slater dove over from dummy-half, the lead changing again to be back with the Kangaroos. Thurston couldn't get the conversion so Australia's lead stayed at only two points, 18–16. In the fifty-eighth minute the Kangaroos were on the attack again when Thurston chipped ahead from twenty metres out for Brett Morris to chase through and score in the corner behind the England defence. The conversion attempt by Thurston was missed so Australia lead 22–16 with twenty-one minutes of the match remaining. Shortly after the kick-off following the try England's Michael Shenton suffered a head clash when trying to tackle front-row forward Ben Hannant and the game was halted as he was stretchered unconscious from the field. Moments after the restart of play Hannant himself was concussed when tackled by James Graham but played on. Australia scored a remarkable try after sixty-six minutes when Darren Lockyer chipped over the top into England's in goal and Slater, chasing through leapt over the dead ball line to slap the ball back in with his hand for Cameron Smith to dive on and claim the four points. Thurston's kick from right in front did not miss so Australia lead 28–16. As the Kangaroos returned the ball after a short kick-off from England they reached the opposition's end of the field and Slater scored again after backing up a good break from Smith. The conversion from Thurston was an easy one so the score was 34–16 in favour of the visitors with under ten minutes of the match remaining. In the seventy-third minute Jarryd Hayne got a try after running through to chase a Lockyer grubber. Thurston added the extras, Australia's lead now 40–16 with a little over five minutes left to play. The Australians got one more try though when Kurt Gidley made a break around the halfway line and kicked ahead, Billy Slater winning the race to the ball to claim his hat-trick in the seventy-seventh minute. Man-of-the-match Thurston added the extras so the score was 46-16 when the final hooter sounded. It was England's heaviest loss to Australia on home soil.

== Awards ==
- Greg Inglis of Australia was named Player of the Tournament.
- Brett Morris of Australia was the tournament's Top Try Scorer with 6 tries.
- Johnathan Thurston of Australia was the tournament's Top Point Scorer with 38 points.

== Broadcast details ==
The competition was televised in Australia, New Zealand, Great Britain and France.

- In Australia, matches were broadcast on Channel Nine.
- In New Zealand, SKY Network Television showed all games live.
- In the United Kingdom, BBC Sport broadcast the first England v Australia match and France v Australia live, with all other matches shown by Sky Sports. Both networks showed highlights programmes. It was the first time terrestrial television had shown international rugby league in the United Kingdom since the 2000 World Cup.
- In France, Orange Sport had rights to the tournament.
- In the United States, from the second round onward, the games were available on ESPN360.
