= Clint Greenshields =

France international rugby league footballer

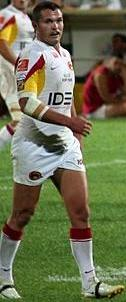

Personal information
- Full name: Clint Greenshields
- Born: 11 January 1982 (age 44) Coffs Harbour, New South Wales, Australia

Playing information
- Height: 180 cm (5 ft 11 in)
- Weight: 88 kg (13 st 12 lb)
- Position: Fullback
Club
| Years | Team | Pld | T | G | FG | P |
|---|---|---|---|---|---|---|
| 2004–06 | St. George Illawarra | 36 | 11 | 0 | 0 | 44 |
| 2007–12 | Catalans Dragons | 146 | 87 | 0 | 0 | 340 |
| 2013 | North Qld Cowboys | 6 | 3 | 0 | 0 | 12 |
| | Total | 188 | 101 | 0 | 0 | 396 |
Representative
| Years | Team | Pld | T | G | FG | P |
| 2009–13 | France | 5 | 1 | 0 | 0 | 4 |

Clint Greenshields (born 11 January 1982) is a former France international rugby league footballer who played as a fullback for the St George Illawarra Dragons and the North Queensland Cowboys in the NRL, and for the Catalans Dragons in the Super League.

== Early years ==
Greenshields was born in Coffs Harbour, New South Wales, Australia.

A former Sawtell resident, Greenshields attended Toormina High School, who compete every year in the Robbie MacKinnon Cup against other local schools of the Coffs Harbour district. His junior club was the Sawtell Panthers JRLFC, a club recently crowned Group 2 senior champions.

== Playing career ==
Greenshields made his first grade debut for the St George Illawarra Dragons after spending time in the lower grades for the Brisbane Broncos and Wests Tigers.

He moved to the Catalans Dragons in 2007 and took the role as first-choice full back, becoming a key player. On 10 May 2008 it was announced that Greenshields has signed a new three-year contract with the French Super League club.

Greenshields was named in the 2008 Super League Dream Team, beating world class talents like Brent Webb and Paul Wellens to be named as the outstanding full back of the Super League season. He was also one of the front runners for the Man of Steel award in 2008.

Greenshields signed a one-year extension to his deal at Catalans Dragons in July 2011.

Greenshields returned to the NRL in 2013, signing with the North Queensland Cowboys, for whom he played 6 times, scoring three tries. He subsequently declared that the 2013 NRL season would be his last as a professional rugby league player, and announced his retirement at the end of the year. However, he later changed his mind and went on to win two Group 2 grand finals, 2017 and 2019 with the Grafton Ghosts.

=== Representative career ===
Qualifying via residency, Greenshields was selected for the French national rugby league team to compete in the 2009 Four Nations tournament. He made his debut against England on 23 October 2009, and played in the match against Australia.

He was named in the France squad for the 2013 Rugby League World Cup.

== Career highlights ==
- Junior Club: Sawtell Panthers JRLFC
- First Grade Debut: Round 9, St George Illawarra v Manly, Brookvale Oval, 9 May 2004
