= Sébastien Martins =

France international rugby league footballer

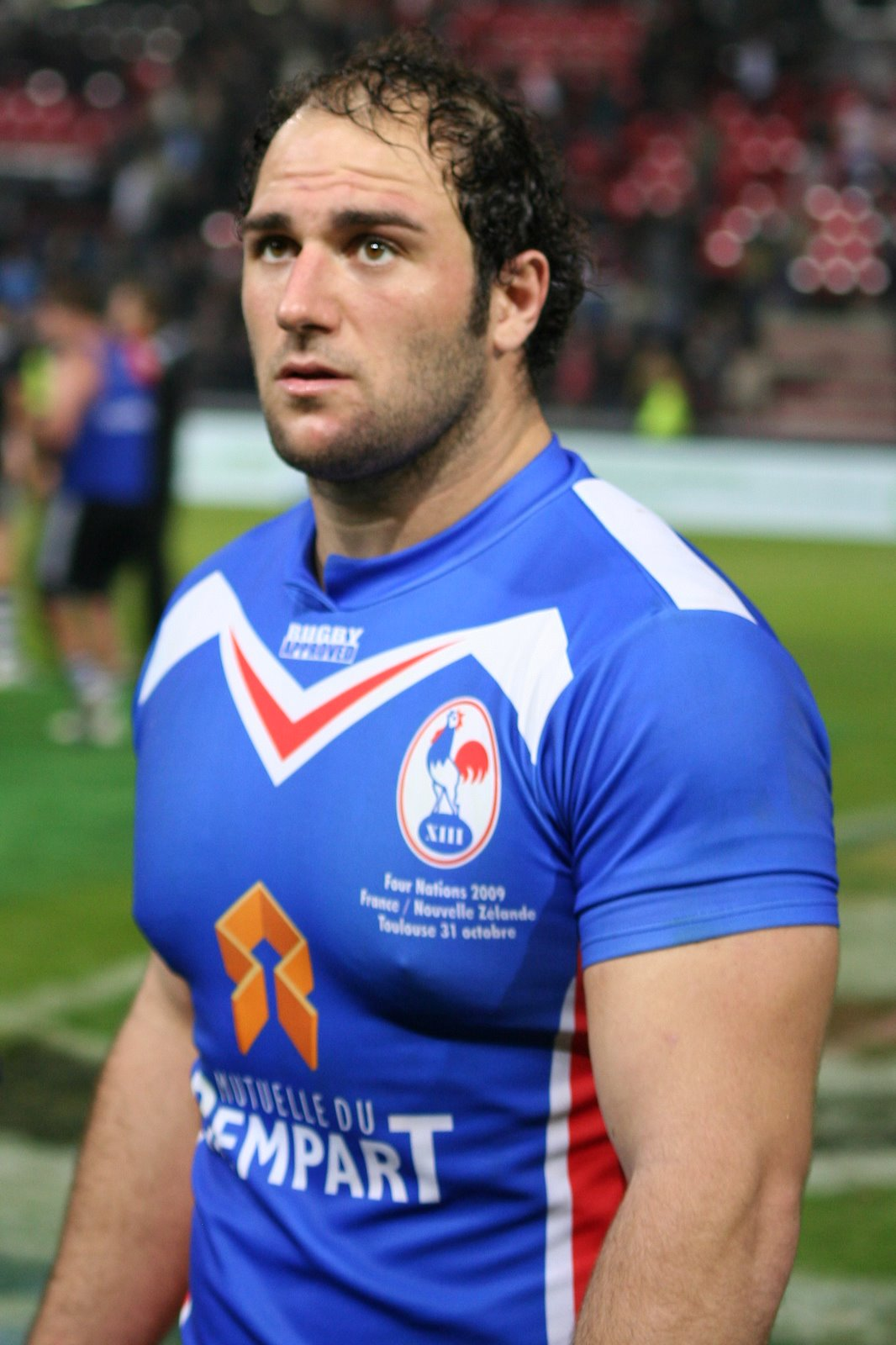

Personal information
- Full name: Sébastien Martins
- Born: 18 November 1985 (age 41) Perpignan, Pyrénées-Orientales, Occitania, France
- Height: 1.92 m (6 ft 4 in)
- Weight: 111 kg (17 st 7 lb)

Playing information
- Position: Prop
Club
Years	Team	Pld	T	G	FG	P
2006–06	Hull Kingston Rovers	4	1	0	0	4
2006–11	Catalans Dragons	14	2	0	0	8
2007(loan)	→ Leigh Centurions	22	2	0	0	8
2011	Toulouse Olympique	4	0	0	0	0
2013	Whitehaven	13	1	0	0	4
2014	North Wales Crusaders	18	2	0	0	8
2015	Newcastle Thunder	8	0	0	0	0
	Total	83	8	0	0	32
Representative
Years	Team	Pld	T	G	FG	P
2008	France	3	2	0	0	8
- Source: As of 28 January 2018

Sébastien Martins (born 18 November 1985), also known by the nickname of "Seb", is a rugby league footballer who plays for the Limoux Grizzlies in the Elite One Championship. He plays as prop.

He has previously played for the Catalans Dragons in the Super League competition.

== Background ==
Martins was born in Perpignan, France.

== Career ==
He is mainly a utility player at home in the front row, second row or centres. Martins signed for National League One club Leigh until the end of the 2007 season. He was signed from French League team Baroudeurs de Pia XIII. He was named in the France training squad for the 2008 Rugby League World Cup. Martins continued to represent France in the 2009 Four Nations tournament. In April 2014, Martins joined North Wales Crusaders as cover for the departing Ryan MacDonald.
