= Romain Gagliazzo =

France international rugby league player

Personal information
- Born: France

Playing information
- Position: Prop
Club
Years	Team	Pld	T	G	FG	P
2000–02	Villeneuve Leopards	4
2005	Catalans Dragons
2009	AS Carcassonne
	Total	4	0	0	0	0
Representative
Years	Team	Pld	T	G	FG	P
1999–09	France	14	0	0	0	0

Romain Gagliazzo is a French rugby league footballer who represented France in the 2000 World Cup.

== Playing career ==
Gagliazzo has played for both the Villeneuve Leopards and AS Carcassonne clubs in the French rugby league championship. He has played at representative level for France on fourteen occasions between 1999 and 2009, including at the 2000 World Cup and 2009 Four Nations.
