= James Wynne (rugby league) =

France international rugby league footballer

Personal information
- Full name: James Wynne
- Born: 16 September 1976 (age 50) Gunnedah, New South Wales, Australia

Playing information
- Position: Stand-off
Club
Years	Team	Pld	T	G	FG	P
2001–02	Newcastle Knights	5	0	0	0	0
2003–06	Toulouse Olympique	18	5	4	0	0
2007–10	Lézignan Sangliers	33	11	0	5	0
	Total	56	16	4	5	0
Representative
Years	Team	Pld	T	G	FG	P
2006–09	France	13	2	0	0	8

Coaching information
Club
Years	Team	Gms	W	D	L	W%
	Lézignan Sangliers	0	0	0	0
- As of 15 Jul 2021

James Wynne (born 16 September 1976) is a former France international rugby league footballer who played for the Newcastle Knights in the National Rugby League competition. Wynne also played for Lézignan Sangliers in the French Rugby League Championship.

== Background ==
He was born in Gunnedah, New South Wales, Australia.

== Club career ==
During the 2001 and 2002 seasons, Wynne was the number-two halfback behind Andrew Johns and was only able to secure five first-grade games. In 2003, Wynne found himself a starting position with French club, Toulouse Olympique, where he was captain.

With Toulouse he lost at home in semi-final of French championship against Lézignan.

== International career ==
In June, 2007, Wynne was selected for France (qualifying through residency) against Great Britain where he started from the bench.

He was named in the France training squad for the 2008 Rugby League World Cup.

James was named Man of the Match in the Rugby League World Cup win over Scotland in Canberra on Sunday 26 October 2008.

== Coaching ==
Since September 2007 he played for French team Lézignan Sangliers, where he was captain and coach, semi-finalist 2008 in Lord Derby Cup against Limoux, Champion of France 2008 beating Pia (champion 2006 & 2007) by 28 to 16.

== Post playing ==
Wynne now resides in Orange NSW with his wife Carly and 2 children. He is now a Fixed Plant Mechanical Supervisor for Newcrest Mining at Cadia Valley Operations 20 kilometres (12 mi) south of Orange NSW.

Wynne acted as captain/coach for the Gunnedah Bulldogs Rugby League Club during the 2012 season.
