= Mathieu Griffi =

France & Spain international rugby league footballer

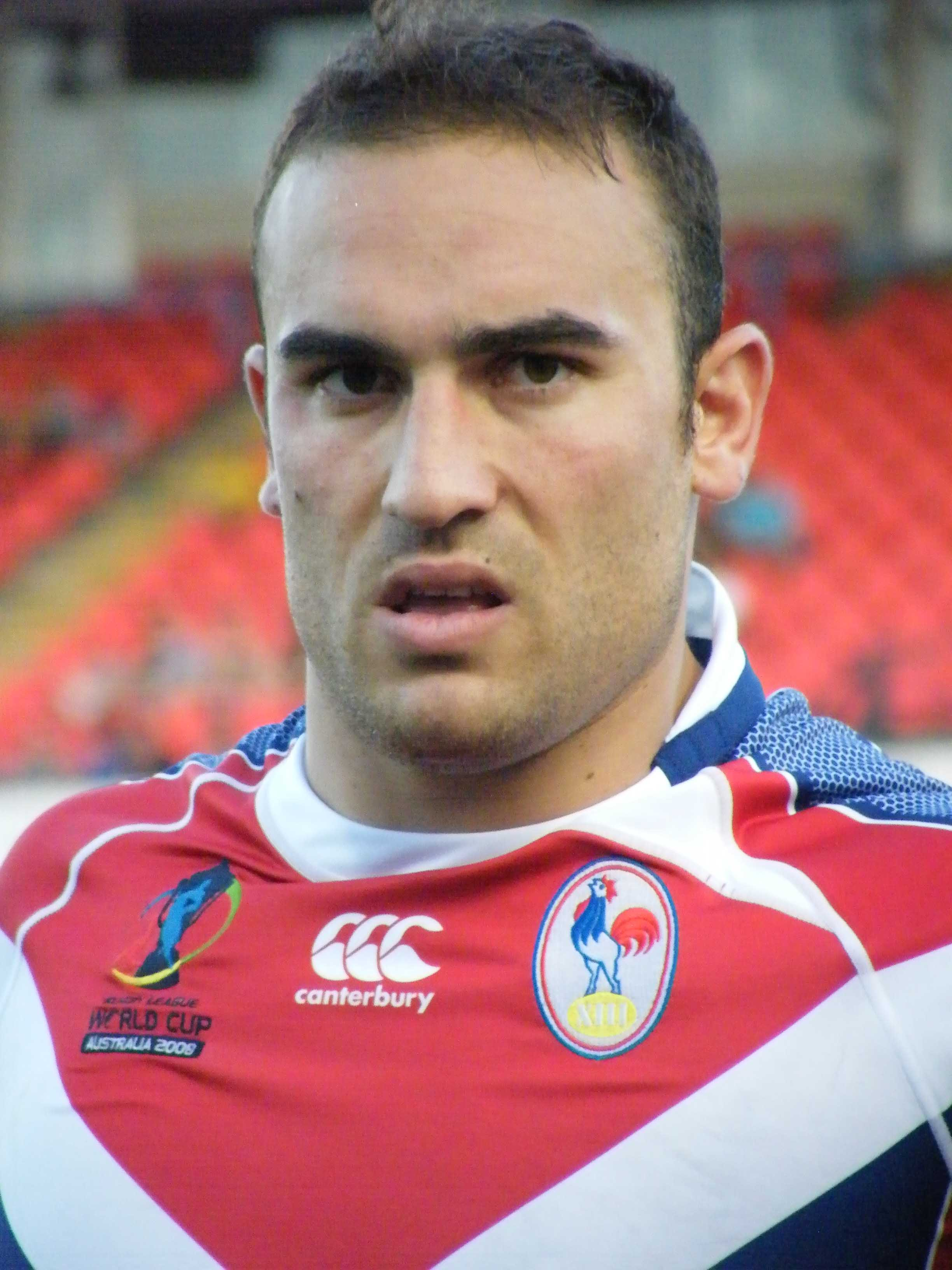

Personal information
- Born: 2 March 1983 (age 43) Aude, Occitania, France
- Height: 187 cm (6 ft 2 in)
- Weight: 101 kg (15 st 13 lb)

Playing information
- Position: Prop
Club
Years	Team	Pld	T	G	FG	P
2006–08	Catalans Dragons	26	0	0	0	0
2009–10	Toulouse Olympique	18	5	0	0	20
2011	Lézignan Sangliers
	Total	44	5	0	0	20
Representative
Years	Team	Pld	T	G	FG	P
2008–10	France	3	0	0	0	0
- Source: As of 21 September 2016

Mathieu Griffi (born 2 March 1983) is a French former professional rugby league footballer who played in the 2000s and 2010s. He played at representative level for France, and at club level for the Catalans Dragons, Toulouse Olympique and in the Elite One Championship for Lézignan Sangliers, as a prop.

== Background ==
Mathieu Griffi was born in Aude, France, and he is of Italian descent.

== Playing career ==
He was named in the France training squad for the 2008 Rugby League World Cup, he was named in the France squad for the 2008 Rugby League World Cup, and he also represented France in the 2009 Four Nations tournament.
