= Steve Matai =

New Zealand international rugby league footballer

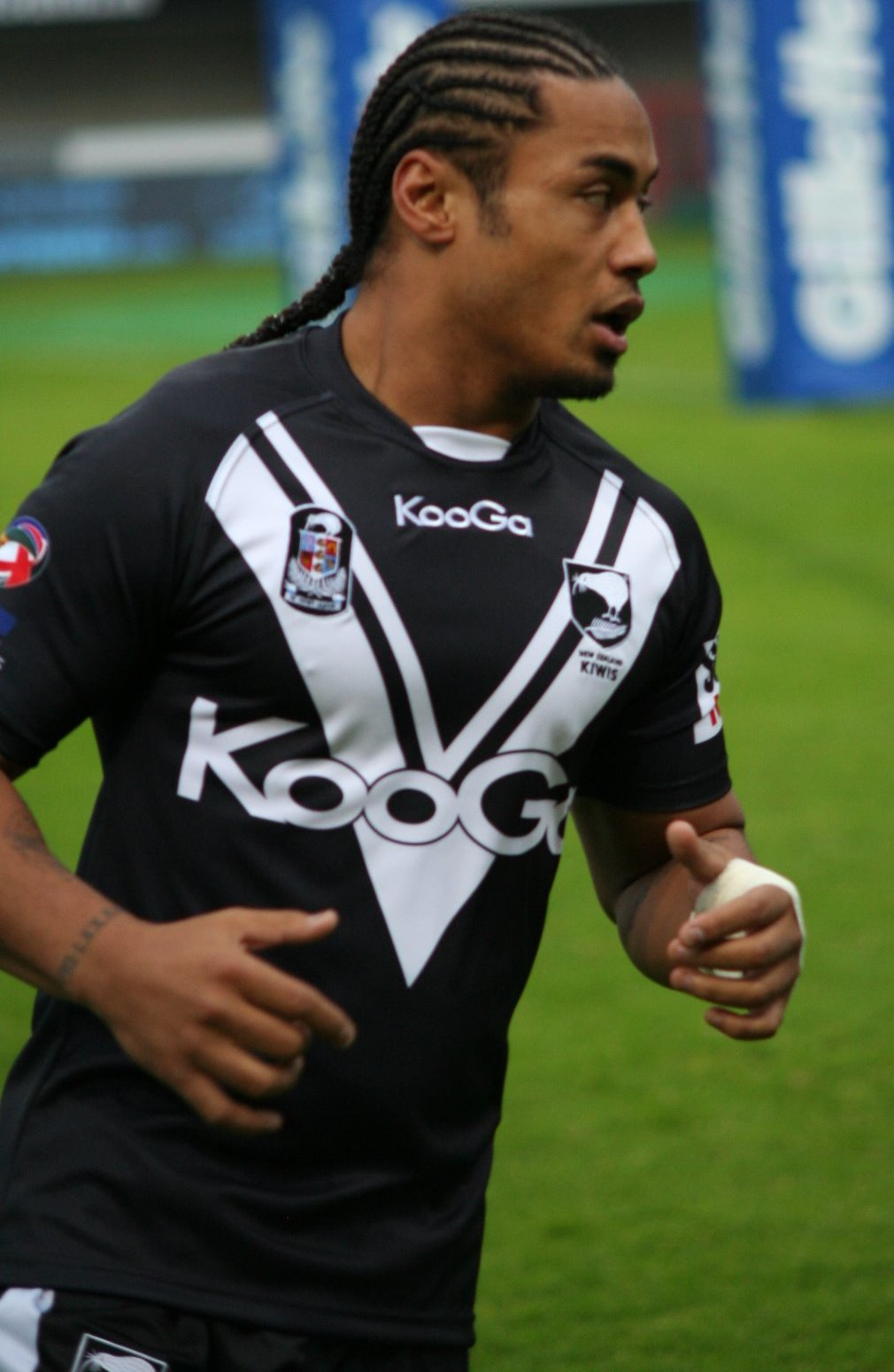

Personal information
- Full name: Stephen Matai
- Born: 5 August 1984 (age 42) Auckland, New Zealand

Playing information
- Height: 183 cm (6 ft 0 in)
- Weight: 94 kg (14 st 11 lb)
- Position: Centre
Club
Years	Team	Pld	T	G	FG	P
2005–16	Manly Sea Eagles	230	91	21	0	406
Representative
Years	Team	Pld	T	G	FG	P
2006–10	New Zealand	10	1	4	0	12
- Relatives: Junior Sa'u (cousin)

Stephen Matai (born 5 August 1984) is a New Zealand former professional rugby league footballer who played in the National Rugby League (NRL )from 2005 to 2016. A New Zealand national representative centre, he played for Australian club the Manly Warringah Sea Eagles. Matai helped the Sea Eagles win the 2008 and 2011 Premierships. He was also part of the New Zealand national squad that won the nation's maiden title at the 2008 Rugby League World Cup. Known particularly for his uncompromising defence, in 2020, Matai was voted the NRL's hardest hitter over the previous 30 years.

== Background ==
Of Samoan descent, Matai was born in Auckland, New Zealand, on 5 August 1984. He is the first cousin of former NRL player, Kiwi and Samoan international Junior Sa'u. Matai grew up with former Warriors and ex-Kiwi teammate Jerome Ropati. Matai played rugby league for Mount Albert Grammar in the first XIII alongside Sonny Bill Williams and Thomas Leuluai. Matai's junior clubs were the Bay Roskill Vikings, Ponsonby Ponies and Richmond Rovers in the Auckland Rugby League. Matai's senior club was Richmond Rovers before he was selected to play for the Marist Richmond Brothers in the Bartercard Cup, before leaving in 2004. Matai joined Queensland Cup side Ipswich Jets in 2004 and credits his time spent at the Jets under the coaching of former Queensland, Eastern Suburbs and Brisbane Broncos hard man Trevor Gillmeister for his reputation as the NRL's "Hitman". Gillmeister, known as "The Axe" for his hard hitting defense, changed Matai's tackling style, teaching him to drive with his legs when making a tackle. In 2005, Matai moved to another Queensland Cup side, but soon left the Wynnum Manly Seagulls after securing an NRL contract with their associate club, the Manly-Warringah Sea Eagles.

== Manly-Warringah Sea Eagles ==
=== 2005 ===
Matai joined the Manly-Warringah Sea Eagles from the Wynnum Manly Seagulls in 2005 after impressing during a strong pre season of training and trials at the Brookvale Oval. In Round 3 of the 2005 NRL season, Matai made his NRL debut for the Manly-Warringah Sea Eagles against Melbourne, playing at centre in Manly's 25–18 win at Brookvale Oval. In Round 6 against the Canberra Raiders, Matai scored his first NRL career try in Manly's 36–14 win at Brookvale Oval. Matai went on to play in 11 matches and score three tries in his debut year in the NRL for the Manly-Warringah Sea Eagles in the 2005 NRL season.

=== 2006 ===
Matai went on to play in 24 matches and score 10 tries for the Manly club in the 2006 NRL season. In the post season Matai was selected for the New Zealand squad for the 2006 Tri-Nations tournament. On 14 October 2006, Matai made his test debut for New Zealand against Australia, playing at centre in the Kiwis 30–18 loss at Mt Smart Stadium. Matai featured in the Kiwis' Tri-Nations Grand Final clash with Australia at Sydney Football Stadium. However, the Kiwis end-up losing 16–12 in golden point extra time.

=== 2007 ===
Matai played in the 2007 NRL Grand Final against Melbourne at centre and scored a try in Manly-Warringah's 34–8 loss. Matai played 11 matches, scored three tries and kicked 4 goals for Manly-Warringah in injury and suspended riddled year for Matai in the 2007 NRL season. On 14 October 2007, Matai was sent off by referee Steve Ganson in the trans-Tasman Test at Westpac Stadium in Wellington, New Zealand, for a high/dangerous tackle on Kangaroos centre Mark Gasnier in the first half of the Trans-Tasman Centenary test game. Once Matai left the field, the Kangaroos ended-up winning the game 58-0 and giving New Zealand their worst ever defeat by Australia in a trans-Tasman test. Matai was given a 2 match ban, but given that Matai had ruled himself out of New Zealand's tour of Great Britain and France for off-season shoulder surgery, Matai later served his suspension during Manly's trial matches in 2008.

=== 2008 ===
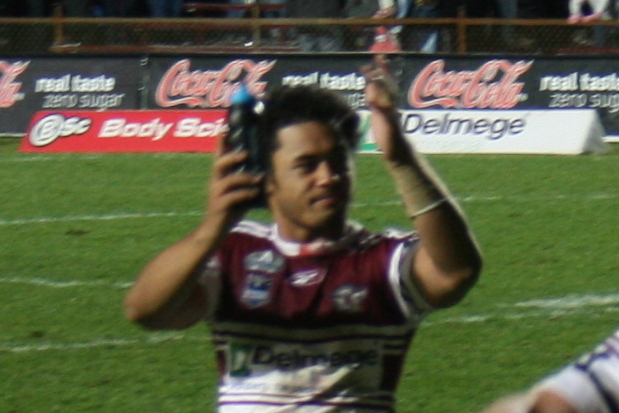
Matai celebrating victory for the Manly Sea Eagles in 2008

On 5 October 2008, in Manly's 2008 NRL Grand Final against Melbourne, Matai played at centre and kicked two goals in Manly's 40–0 record victory. Matai had been an occasional goal kicker for Manly during the year. Matai played 21 matches, 7 scored tries and kicked 12 goals in a successful year for Manly-Warringah in the 2008 NRL season. In August 2008, Matai was named in the New Zealand training squad for the 2008 Rugby League World Cup. In September 2008, Matai was named in the final 24-man squad. Matai featured in the Kiwis first World Cup tournament clash against Australia at Sydney Football Stadium. Matai kicked a conversion goal-attempt to convert Sika Manu's try, but he was placed on-report for a high tackle in the Kiwis 30–6 loss. Matai missed New Zealand's World Cup match with Papua New Guinea after being handed a one-match ban for a high tackle against Australia. New Zealand would eventually go on to upset heavy favourites Australia 34–20 in the final to win their maiden World Cup. The win would cap a successful year for Matai taking the NRL Premiership and World Cup double.

=== 2009 ===
Matai played in 22 matches and scored 3 tries for Manly-Warringah in the 2009 NRL season. In the post season, Matai was selected in the New Zealand Kiwis' 2009 Rugby League Four Nations squad. Matai featured at left centre, scoring a try in the Kiwis 40–24 win over Tonga of the Kiwis Four Nations warm-up test at Rotorua International Stadium. Matai even featured in the Kiwis' Four Nation games; the 20-all draw against Australia and the Kiwis' 62–12 win over France. However he injured himself in the round 2 clash against France and that force him to withdraw from the Kiwis' regular and third round of the tournament clash against England and the Kiwis end-up losing 12–20. That game also eliminated the Kiwis from the 2009 Four Nations tournament, allowing England to face Australia in the final.

=== 2010 ===
Matai was selected to make his 10th test appearance for New Zealand for the annual ANZAC test at AAMI Park. Matai partnered his cousin Junior Sa'u in the centres for the Kiwis in a 12–8 loss to Australia. Opposing Matai in the centres for the Kangaroos was his Manly centre partner Jamie Lyon. During the test, Matai was placed on-report in the first half for a foul hit play on the Australian fullback, Billy Slater. Coincidentally both Manly centres played their last tests for their countries on the night, as Lyon announced his retirement from representative football later in the season, while Matai has not been selected to play for the Kiwis since that game. In Round 15, against the South Sydney Rabbitohs, Matai played in his 100th NRL career match and scored two tries in Manly's 26–25 win at Brookvale Oval. Matai played 21 matches and scored 14 tries and kicked a goal for Manly-Warringah in the 2010 NRL season.

=== 2011 ===
On 2 October 2011, in Manly-Warringah's 2011 NRL Grand Final against the New Zealand Warriors, Matai played at centre in Manly's 24–10 victory. Matai played in 22 matches and scored 9 tries in Manly-Warringah's grand final winning year in the 2011 NRL season.

=== 2012 ===
Matai travelled to England with Manly for the 2012 World Club Challenge match against 2011 Super League champions Leeds Rhinos, playing at centre in the 26–12 loss at Headingley Stadium. On 25 May 2012, Matai re-signed with Manly for a further three years to the end of the 2015 NRL season. Midway through the 2012 season in Round 12, Matai was charged with a high tackle in a game in Manly's 22–4 loss against the Penrith Panthers at Penrith Stadium. This resulted Matai to his thirteenth trip to the NRL Judiciary, equalling the record set by Michael Crocker. In Week 1 of the 2012 finals series against minor premiers the Canterbury-Bankstown Bulldogs, Matai played his 150th NRL career match in Manly's 16–10 loss. After the match, Matai was suspended for a high shot on Canterbury's Sam Perrett and missed the rest of Manly's finals matches. Matai played in 18 matches and scored 6 tries for Manly-Warringah in the 2012 NRL season.

=== 2013 ===
In Round 17 against the Parramatta Eels at Brookvale Oval, Matai was involved in a heated clash with Parramatta Prop Mitchell Allgood in Manly's 50–10 win. In the 72nd minute of the game Allgood gave away a penalty with a swinging arm on Manly Second-rower Jamie Buhrer. The Manly centre ran ten metres out of the line to remonstrate with Allgood who immediately let fly with three right hands to Matai's chin, earning himself ten minutes in the sin-bin and a two-week suspension. Matai, who had already been suspended earlier in the season for a shoulder charge on South Sydney Rabbitohs prop George Burgess, was placed on report for inciting a melee but did not have to front the judiciary for a record 15th time. On 6 October 2013, in the Sea Eagles 2013 NRL Grand Final against the Sydney Roosters, Matai played at centre and scored a try in the second half in Manly's 26–18 loss. Matai played in 27 matches and scored 12 tries for Manly in the 2013 NRL season.

=== 2014 ===
Matai twice requested a release from Manly-Warringah, following the New Zealand Warriors offering him a $AUD 2.5 million four-year contract. Both requests were rejected by Manly. Matai was contracted with the Sea Eagles to the end of the 2015 season. In Round 25 against the Penrith Panthers, Matai played his 200th NRL career match in Manly's 26–25 win at Brookvale Oval. Matai finished off Manly's 2014 NRL season with him playing in 25 matches, scoring 13 tries and kicking 4 goals.

=== 2015 ===
On 18 February 2015, Matai announced he will finish his career as a one-club man after re-signing with Manly until the end of 2017, knocking back lucrative offers from the Gold Coast Titans and the New Zealand Warriors to remain at Brookvale. In Round 16 against the South Sydney Rabbitohs, Matai produced the biggest hit of the season when he drilled Rabbitohs prop David Tyrrell in a crunching tackle in Manly's 20–8 loss at ANZ Stadium. Matai played in 19 matches and scored nine tries for Manly-Warringah in the 2015 NRL season.

=== 2016–2017 ===
On 6 April 2016, Matai announced that he would return to international rugby league after a six-year exile. He said he wanted to play for his parents' birth country, Samoa, in the 2017 World Cup. However, he sustained another injury on his troublesome neck which needed surgery, forcing him into retirement at the beginning of 2017.
