= Constant Villegas =

France international rugby league player

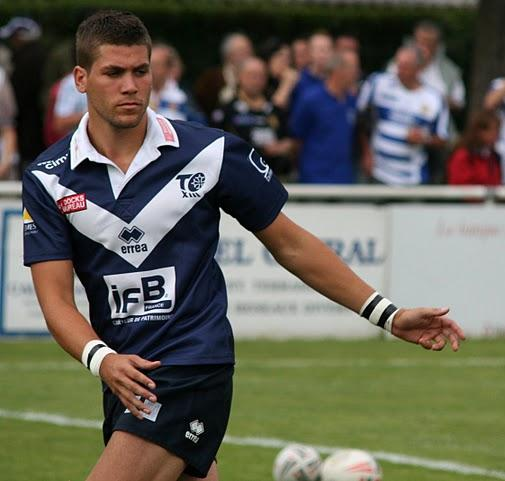

Personal information
- Born: 21 October 1986 (age 40) France
- Height: 1.87 m (6 ft 2 in)
- Weight: 89 kg (14 st 0 lb)

Playing information
- Position: Scrum-half
Club
Years	Team	Pld	T	G	FG	P
2007–10	Toulouse Olympique	24	8	2	0	36
2011–	Villeneuve XIII	97	29	52	4	222
	Total	121	37	54	4	258
Representative
Years	Team	Pld	T	G	FG	P
2007–10	France	6	0	0	0	0
- Source: As of 21 July 2019

Constant Villegas is a French professional rugby league footballer who currently plays for Villeneuve XIII in the Elite One Championship. He previously played for Toulouse Olympique. He plays as a five-eighth or halfback. He is a France international.

He was named in the France training squad for the 2008 Rugby League World Cup.

Villegas represented France in the 2009 Four Nations tournament.
