= Eorl Crabtree =

British former professional rugby league footballer who played in the 2000s and 2010s

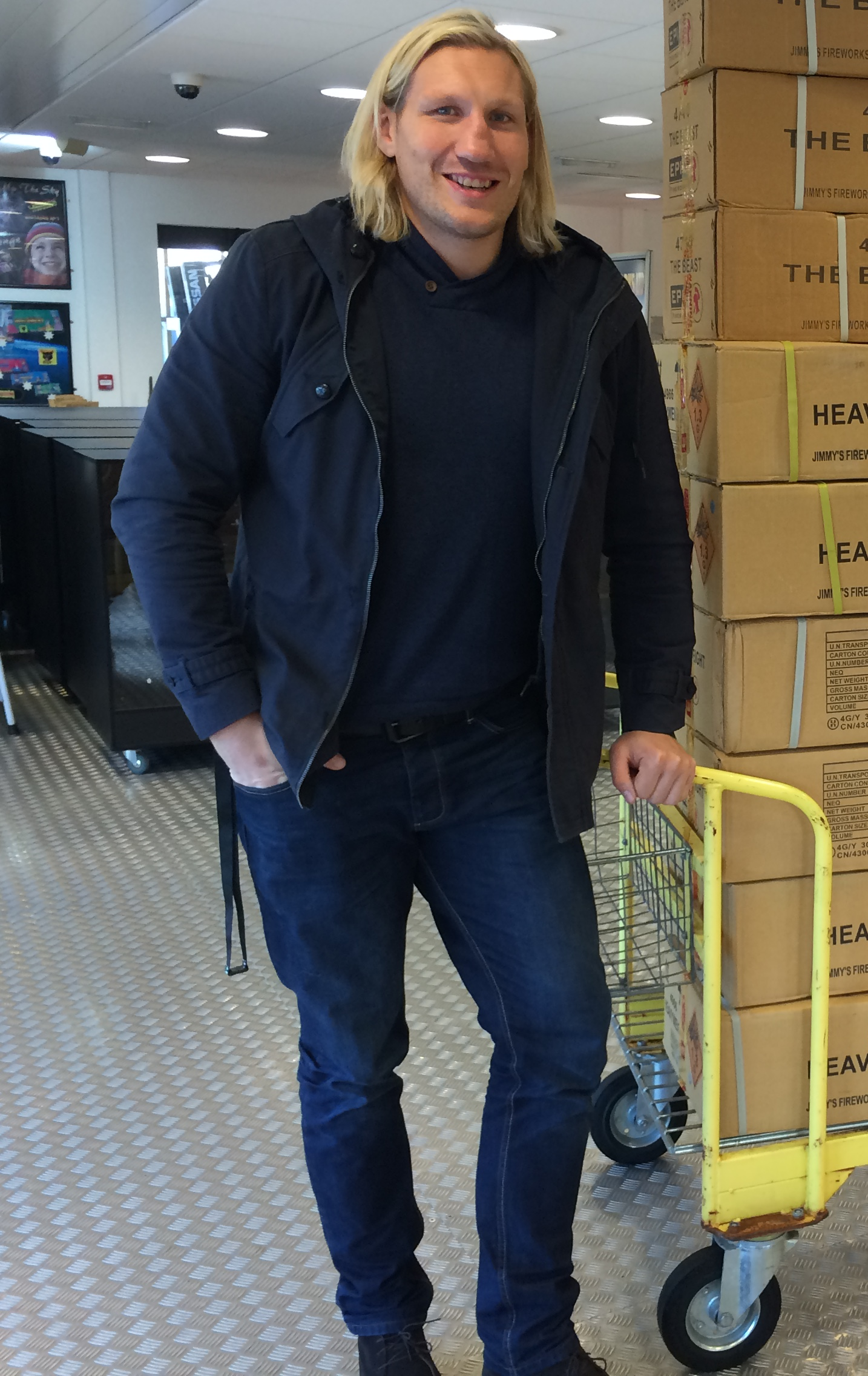

Personal information
- Full name: Eorl Dale Crabtree
- Born: 2 October 1982 (age 43) Cleethorpes, Lincolnshire, England

Playing information
- Height: 6 ft 5 in (1.96 m)
- Weight: 18 st 4 lb (116 kg)
- Position: Prop, Second-row, Centre
Club
Years	Team	Pld	T	G	FG	P
2001–16	Huddersfield Giants	424	79	0	0	316
Representative
Years	Team	Pld	T	G	FG	P
2004–10	England	14	3	0	0	12

Eorl Crabtree (born 2 October 1982) is an English former professional rugby league footballer who played in the 2000s and 2010s. He played at international level for England, and at club level in the Super League for the Huddersfield Giants, where he spent his entire club career, primarily as a prop, but also as a centre, second-row or loose forward.

He is managing director of the Midlands Hurricanes.

== Early years ==
Born in Cleethorpes, Lincolnshire, Crabtree has lived in Meltham since he was three years old and attended Honley High School. He is a distant nephew of legendary professional wrestler Shirley "Big Daddy" Crabtree, himself a former professional rugby league footballer who played for Bradford Northern, although he never made an appearance for the first team.

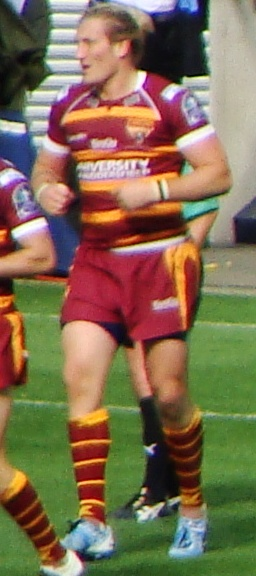
Crabtree while playing for Huddersfield in 2010

== Playing career ==
=== Club career ===
Crabtree signed for Huddersfield on his 17th birthday and he made his début for the club in 2001. The following season he scored 25 tries in 37 league and cup appearances whilst playing at centre during Huddersfield's National League promotion season. His breakthrough year in Super League was 2004 where, under coach Jon Sharp, he established himself as a regular in Huddersfield's first team and developed a reputation as an imposing figure with his mix of size and athleticism. Crabtree played for Huddersfield in the 2006 Challenge Cup Final as a second-row against St. Helens but the Giants lost 12–42. Crabtree had a superb 2009 campaign at Huddersfield. Having helped them to a third-place finish in the Super League, and to Wembley for the Challenge Cup final, Crabtree also impressed national coach Tony Smith who selected Eorl in the England squad for the 2009 Four Nations. At the end of the year, Crabtree signed a new long-term contract until the end of the 2015 season.

Crabtree was an integral part of the Huddersfield team that finished top of Super League XVIII, and was one of four Huddersfield players selected in the Super League Dream Team that year. In April 2014, Crabtree made his 350th appearance for the Giants in a 33–14 win over Warrington in Super League XIX. With this appearance he is currently the 14th most capped Huddersfield club player ever. In 2015, he signed an extension to his contract taking him until the end of the 2017 season. On 3 September 2015, Crabtree made history and became the 10th most capped club player of the Huddersfield Giants. He also scored a try on his 400th appearance for the club.

Crabtree announced his retirement as a player on 7 November 2016 to become an ambassador for Huddersfield. He also made regular appearances as a commentator and pundit for BBC Sport's rugby league coverage. In January 2024, Crabtree became the managing director of League 1 club the Midlands Hurricanes thus ending his long association with Huddersfield.

=== International career ===
Crabtree played 13 times at international level for England. He featured in the 2009 and 2010 Four Nations tournaments, but missed out on selection in 2011.

== External links and notes ==
- (archived by web.archive.org) Huddersfield Giants profile
