= Junior Sa'u =

New Zealand & Samoan rugby league player

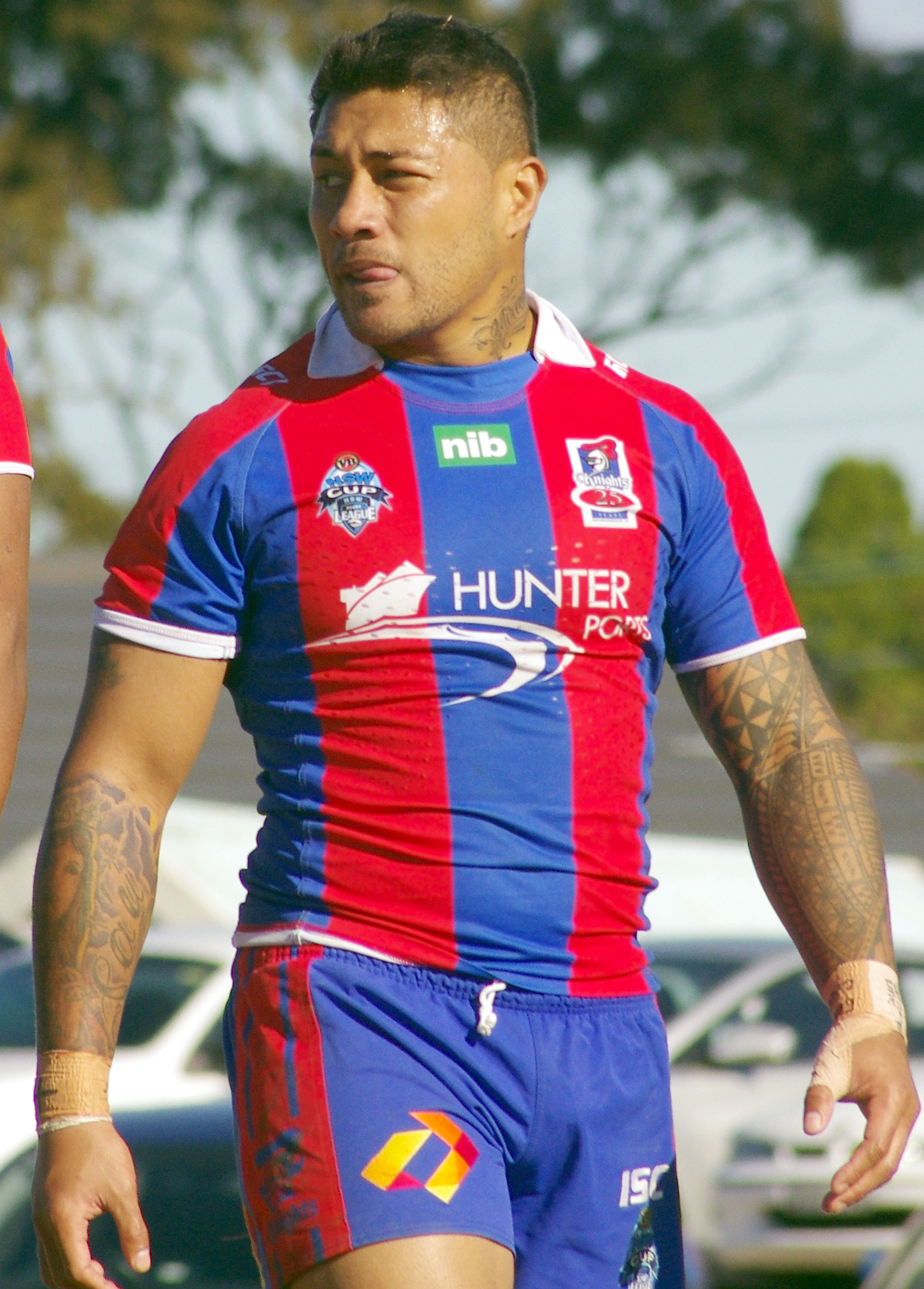

Personal information
- Full name: Tafeaga Junior Sa'u
- Born: 18 April 1987 (age 39) Ōtāhuhu, Auckland, New Zealand
- Height: 5 ft 9 in (1.75 m)
- Weight: 15 st 4 lb (97 kg)

Playing information

Rugby league
- Position: Centre
Club
Years	Team	Pld	T	G	FG	P
2008–12	Newcastle Knights	86	26	0	0	104
2013	Melbourne Storm	4	1	0	0	4
2014–19	Salford Red Devils	142	59	0	0	236
2019(loan)	→Wakefield Trinity	3	0	0	0	0
2019–21	Leigh Centurions	28	5	0	0	20
2022–25	Keighley Cougars	56	28	0	0	112
2026–	Rochdale Hornets	29	1	0	0	4
	Total	348	120	0	0	480
Representative
Years	Team	Pld	T	G	FG	P
2009–10	New Zealand	9	8	0	0	32
2013	Samoa	2	0	0	0	0

Rugby union
- Position: Center
Club
Years	Team	Pld	T	G	FG	P
2022–23	Old Glory DC	25	12	0	0	60
- Source: As of 02 October 2026
- Relatives: Steve Matai (cousin)

Tafeaga Junior Sa'u (born 18 April 1987) is a professional New Zealand and Samoan rugby league player who plays for Rochdale Hornets.

He previously played for New Zealand and Samoa at the international level.

He previously played for the Newcastle Knights and the Melbourne Storm in the NRL, the Salford Red Devils in the Super League, and the Leigh Centurions in the Super League. He spent time in 2019 on loan from Salford at Wakefield Trinity in the Super League. Sa'u has also played rugby union for Old Glory DC in Major League Rugby (MLR) in the United States.

== Background ==
Sa'u was born in Auckland, New Zealand to Samoan parents from Lauli'i and Apolima.

He played his junior football for Logan Brothers in Queensland, Australia before being signed by the Canberra Raiders.

== Playing career ==
=== Early career ===
He played for Canberra's Premier League team in 2006, scoring seven tries.

=== Newcastle Knights ===
Sa'u then signed a four-year contract starting in 2008 to be a part of the newly cleaned out Newcastle Knights.

In Round 13 of the 2008 NRL season he made his NRL début for the Newcastle club against the Canterbury-Bankstown Bulldogs. He scored two tries on debut.

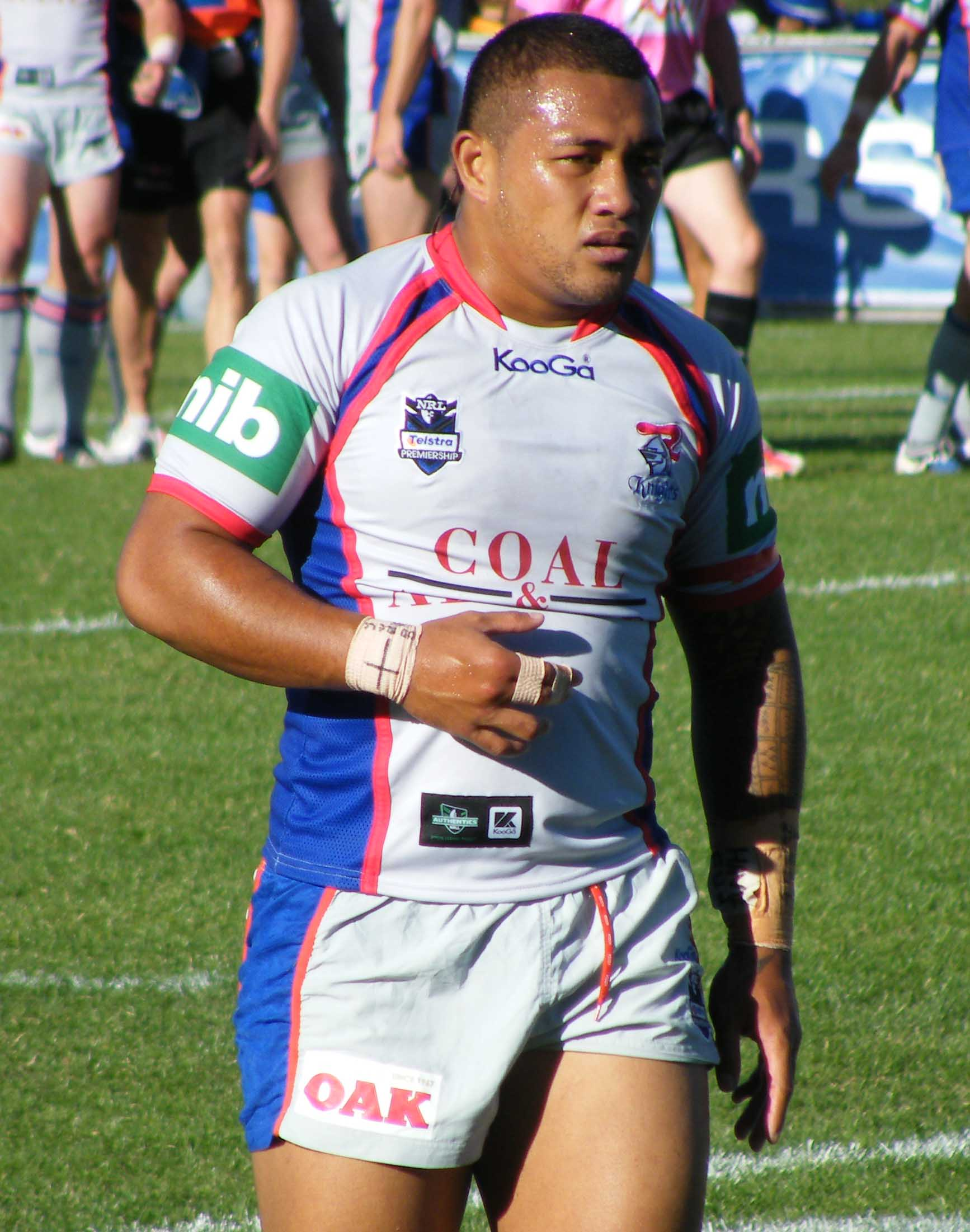
Sa'u playing for the Newcastle Knights in 2009

In June 2011, Sa'u re-signed with the Newcastle club for a further two years.

=== Melbourne Storm ===
On 18 August 2012, Sa'u was released from the final year of his Newcastle contract and signed with the Melbourne Storm on a one-year contract starting in 2013.

=== Salford Red Devils ===
In June 2013, it was announced that Sa'u had signed a two-year deal with Salford in the Super League starting in 2014.

Scoring 12 tries in his début season with Salford, he was voted k'Supporter's Player of the Year' for 2014.

=== Wakefield Trinity ===
On 14 May 2019, after five years with the Salford club, Sau joined fellow Super League team Wakefield Trinity on an initial one month loan.

=== Leigh Centurions ===
Sa'u joined the Leigh Centurions in the 2019 RFL Championship.

In round 18 of the 2021 Super League season, he scored two tries for Leigh in a 28-34 loss against Hull Kingston Rovers.

=== Old Glory DC ===
Sa'u made the switch to rugby union in 2022, joining Major League Rugby side Old Glory DC in the United States.

=== Keighley Cougars ===
At the conclusion of the 2022 Major League Rugby season Sa'u returned to the United Kingdom and rugby league and signed for League 1 team Keighley Cougars until the end of the 2022 League 1 season. Sa'u was named as captain of the team for the 2025 season.

=== Rochdale Hornets ===
On 1 October 2025 it was reported that he had signed for Rochdale Hornets for 2026.

== International career ==
In 2008, Sa'u was named in the Samoa training squad for the 2008 Rugby League World Cup but did not make the final squad.

In 2009, Sa'u was selected in the New Zealand Kiwis Four Nations squad and made his international début for the Kiwis against Tonga.

In 2010, Sa'u was selected for New Zealand in the 2010 ANZAC Test. He was also again selected in the New Zealand squad for the 2010 Four Nations.

In 2013, Sa'u played for Samoa in the Pacific Rugby League International against Tonga. He was also called in the 2013 Rugby League World Cup squad to replace the initially selected Roy Asotasi.

== Personal life ==
He is a cousin to former Manly-Warringah Sea Eagles player Steve Matai.

In 2009, Sa'u was praised for coming to the aid of a 15-year-old girl who was being assaulted in Waratah, New South Wales.

== Statistics ==
Year	Team	Games	Tries	Pts
2008	Newcastle Knights	12	7	28
2009	Newcastle Knights	25	6	24
2010	Newcastle Knights	20	7	28
2011	Newcastle Knights	21	4	16
2012	Newcastle Knights	8	2	8
2013	Melbourne Storm	4	1	4
2014	Salford Red Devils	27	14	56
2015	Salford Red Devils	23	6	24
2016	Salford Red Devils	32	18	72
2017	Salford Red Devils	24	9	36
2018	Salford Red Devils	28	11	44
2019	Salford Red Devils	8	1	4
2019	Wakefield Trinity	3		
2019	Leigh Leopards	6	2	8
2020	Leigh Leopards	6		
2021	Leigh Leopards	16	3	12
2022	Keighley Cougars	8	9	36
2023	Keighley Cougars	9	2	8
2024	Keighley Cougars	21	13	52
2025	Keighley Cougars	18	4	16
2026	Rochdale Hornets	0	0	0
Totals		317	118	472
