= Leon Williamson =

New Zealand rugby league referee

Personal information
- Born: 10 December 1967 (age 58) Auckland, New Zealand

Refereeing information
Years	Competition	Apps
2003–06	Bartercard Cup
2008–10	Toyota Cup	23
2008	World Cup	2
2009	Four Nations	3
2003–13	Auckland Rugby League

Leon Williamson is a New Zealand former rugby league referee. An international referee, Williamson also controlled Auckland Rugby League, New Zealand Rugby League, Rugby Football League Championship and Toyota Cup matches.

== Referee career ==
Williamson took up refereeing in 1996. Prior to this he was a kickboxer and was ranked 19th in the world in the 61 kg super-lightweight division.

Williamson served as an international referee and refereed in the 2008 World Cup, 2009 European Cup and 2009 Four Nations. In the 2009 Four Nations he was appointed to referee the final between Australia and England. He has also controlled various one off international matches.

Williamson retired from international matches in 2010, his last international appointment was controlling the match between the New Zealand Māori rugby league team and the England national rugby league team on 16 October.

In 2013 Williamson lost a tooth during a match after a spectator threw a rock at him.

== Personal life ==
Leon resides in Wattle Downs, in thesSouth of Auckland. He is married to Vicky and together have two children.
