= Frank-Paul Nu'uausala =

New Zealand international rugby league footballer

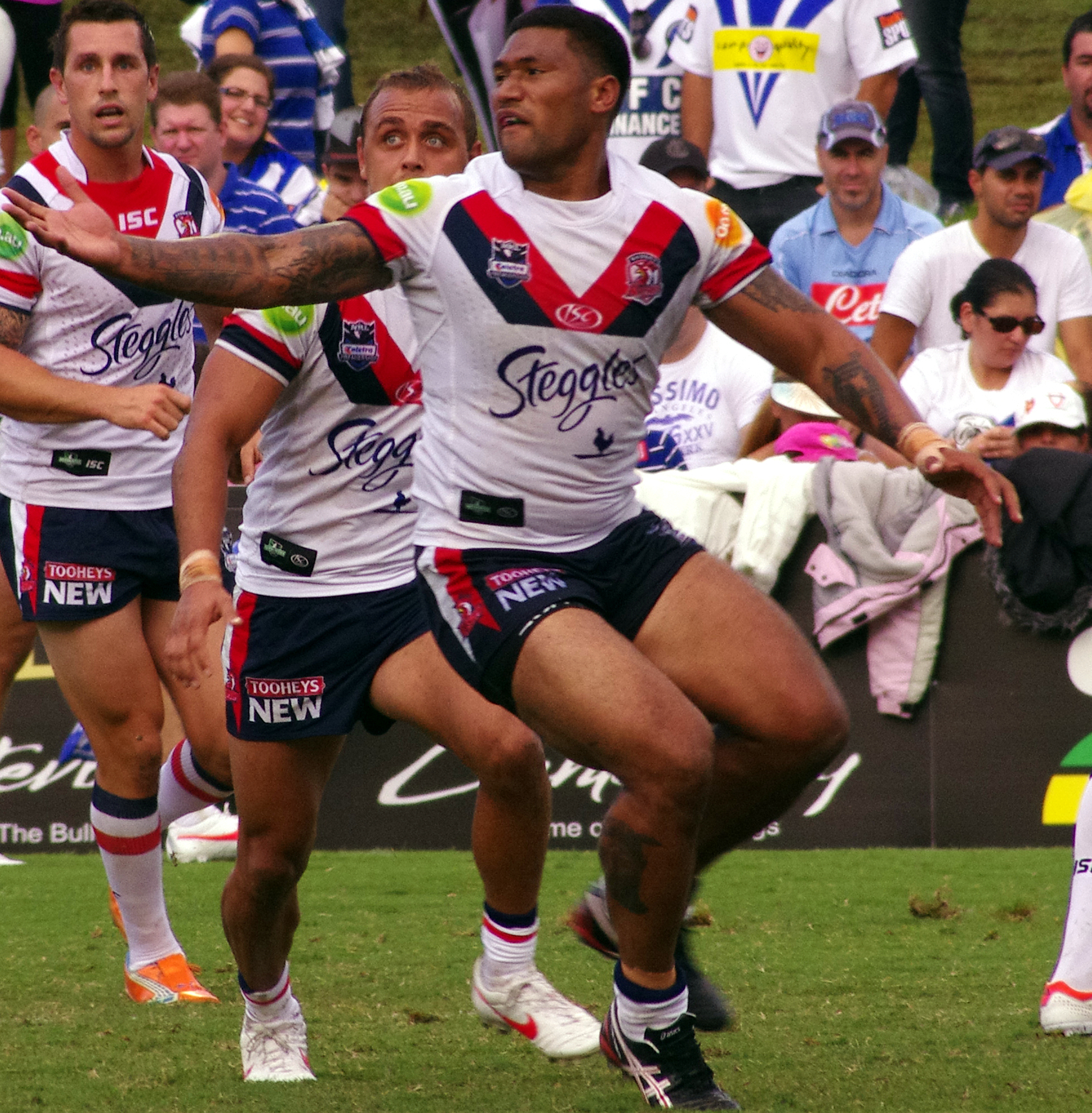

Personal information
- Born: 13 February 1987 (age 39) Auckland, New Zealand
- Height: 184 cm (6 ft 0 in)
- Weight: 109 kg (17 st 2 lb)

Playing information
- Position: Prop, Lock, Second-row
Club
Years	Team	Pld	T	G	FG	P
2007–14	Sydney Roosters	153	15	0	0	60
2015–16	Canberra Raiders	31	1	0	0	4
2016–17	Wigan Warriors	47	2	0	0	8
2018	Sydney Roosters	2	0	0	0	0
	Total	233	18	0	0	72
Representative
Years	Team	Pld	T	G	FG	P
2009–13	New Zealand	15	5	0	0	20
- Source: As of 3 March 2018
- Education: De La Salle College, Māngere East
- Relatives: Annetta Nu'uausala (sister)

Frank-Paul Nu'uausala (born 13 February 1987), also known by the nicknames of "Frank Paul the Wrecking Ball" or "Frank the tank", is a New Zealand former professional rugby league footballer. A New Zealand international representative forward, Nu'uausala most notably played for the Sydney Roosters with whom he won the 2013 NRL Premiership.

== Background ==
Born in Auckland, New Zealand, Nu'uausala comes from a large family of 6 sisters and 6 brothers, he is the fifth eldest and is of Chinese, Maori Samoan and Solomon Islander descent.

Nu'uausala has played rugby league since the age of 5, originally with Mangere East Hawks. Nu'uausala played for the Otahuhu-Ellerslie Leopards in the 2004 Bartercard Cup and toured England with New Zealand 'A'. Nu'uausala was signed by the New Zealand Warriors when he was 14 and played in their lower grades until 2006 when he was cut by incoming coach Ivan Cleary. Nu'uausala later signed with the Sydney Roosters.

== Playing career ==
=== 2007 ===
In round 7 of the 2007 NRL season against the Parramatta Eels, Nu’uausala made his NRL debut for the Sydney Roosters of the interchange bench in the Roosters 16–36 loss at SFS. Nu’uausala finished his debut year in the NRL with him playing in 3 matches for the Roosters in the 2007 NRL season.

=== 2008 ===
In round 5 against the Penrith Panthers, Nu’uausala first match for the Roosters in 2008, scoring his first NRL career try in the Roosters 28–12 win at Penrith Stadium. Nu’uausala finished the 2008 NRL season with him playing 11 matches and scoring a try for the Roosters.

=== 2009 ===
Nu’uausala cemented a spot in the forwards in the Roosters squad playing in 24 matches for the Roosters in the 2009 NRL season as the club finished last on the table for the first time since 1966. Nu'uausala was named in the New Zealand national rugby league team squad for the 2009 Four Nations. Nu'uausala made his international test debut against Australia, scoring a try in the 20–20 draw against Australia at The Stoop.

=== 2010 ===
For the 2010 Anzac Test, Nu'uausala was selected to play for New Zealand at prop in the Kiwis 12–8 loss against Australia at AAMI Park. In Round 12 against the Gold Coast Titans, Nu’uausala scored a double in the Roosters 30–16 win at Robina Stadium. On 3 October 2010, in the Roosters 2010 NRL Grand Final against the St George Illawarra Dragons, Nu’uausala played off the interchange bench in the Roosters 32–8 loss. Nu’uausala finished the 2010 NRL season with him playing in all the Roosters 28 matches and scoring 7 tries. On 5 October 2010, Nu’uausala was selected in the New Zealand 2010 Four Nations squad, playing in 4 matches including playing the interchange bench in the Kiwis 16-12 Four Nations Final victory over Australia at Suncorp Stadium.

=== 2011 ===
Nu’uausala finished the 2011 NRL season with him playing in 19 matches and scoring 4 tries for the Roosters as the club missed out on the finals after finishing 11th on the table.

=== 2012 ===
Nu’uausala finished the 2012 NRL season with him playing in 19 matches and scoring 2 tries for the Roosters as the side missed out on the finals for a second consecutive year.

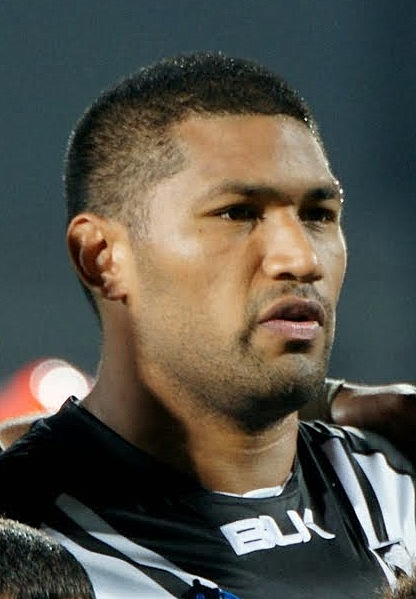
Nu'uausala during 2013 World Cup

=== 2013 ===
On 9 July 2013, Nu’uausala extended his contract for a further two years, keeping him at the club till the end of the 2015 NRL season. On 6 October 2013, Nu'uausala won the 2013 NRL Grand Final with the Roosters. Nu’uausala finished the 2013 NRL season with playing in 23 matches for the Roosters. Nu'uausala was selected in the New Zealand 2013 World Cup squad, playing in 5 matches and scoring 3 tries including in a double in the Kiwis 48–0 victory over France at Parc des Sports. Nu'uausala played off the interchange bench in the Kiwis 34–2 loss to Australia in the World Cup final at Old Trafford.

=== 2014 ===
In the Roosters 2014 World Club Challenge match against 2013 Super League champions the Wigan Warriors, Nu’uausala played at lock in the Roosters 36–14 victory SFS. In Round 25 against the Melbourne Storm at SFS, Nu’uausala played up his 150th NRL career match in the Roosters 24–12 win. Nu’uausala finished off the 2014 NRL season with him playing in 26 matches and scoring a try for the Roosters. On 3 December 2014, Nu'uausala signed a three-year contract with the Canberra Raiders starting in 2015 after being released from the final year of his Roosters contract.

=== 2015 ===
In round 1 of the 2015 NRL season against the Cronulla-Sutherland Sharks, Nu’uausala made his club debut for the Canberra Raiders off the interchange bench in the Raiders 24–20 win at Remondis Stadium. In Round 7 against the Wests Tigers, he scored his first try for the Raiders in their 30–22 comeback win at Leichhardt Oval. He finished off his first season with the Raiders having played in all 24 matches and scoring 1 try.

=== 2016 ===
On 24 June 2016, it was announced that Nu’uausala signed a three-year deal with the Wigan Warriors in the Super League. Nu’uausala joined the club with immediate effect and is expected to arrive in the next few weeks once he receives his visa. Wigan coach Shaun Wane said: "Frank-Paul is exactly the kind of player we want at Wigan". "He's a very tough player who really throws himself into the action and is used to winning". "He's also very experienced having played in the World Cup final, the Australian Grand Final and the World Club Challenge". "We’ve not had much luck with injuries this year and this signing is exactly the kind of boost we need, at this time, as we look to mount a serious challenge for trophies". "The Wigan fans are really going to enjoy watching Frank-Paul play for us." Nuuausala said: "I’ve achieved everything that I can in my career in the NRL and, whilst still in my prime as a prop-forward, want to experience the challenge of Super League. "It would be great to win the Grand Final over there as well and the Challenge Cup at Wembley and joining a strong and successful club like Wigan gives me that best opportunity. "I’m looking forward to pulling on the famous cherry-and-white jersey for the first time and playing in the uniquely passionate environment of rugby league in England." Nu’uausala played in 7 matches for the Raiders in the 2016 NRL season. On his home debut for the Warriors, he was sin-binned against their old rivals St Helens which immediately made him a crowd favourite.

His running game and powerful tackles helped Wigan lift the 2016 Super League Grand Final trophy with victory over the Warrington Wolves at Old Trafford.

=== 2017 ===
Nu'uausala starred in the World Club Championship win over the Cronulla-Sutherland Sharks becoming one of only a handful of players who have won the trophy with two clubs in England and Australia.

He played in the 2017 Challenge Cup Final defeat by Hull F.C. at Wembley Stadium.

=== 2018 ===
Nu'uausala re-joined the Sydney Roosters on a one-year deal after being released from his contract at Wigan. On 22 August, it was announced that Nu'uausala would be retiring at the end of the 2018 season.
