= Anthony Watmough =

Australia international rugby league footballer

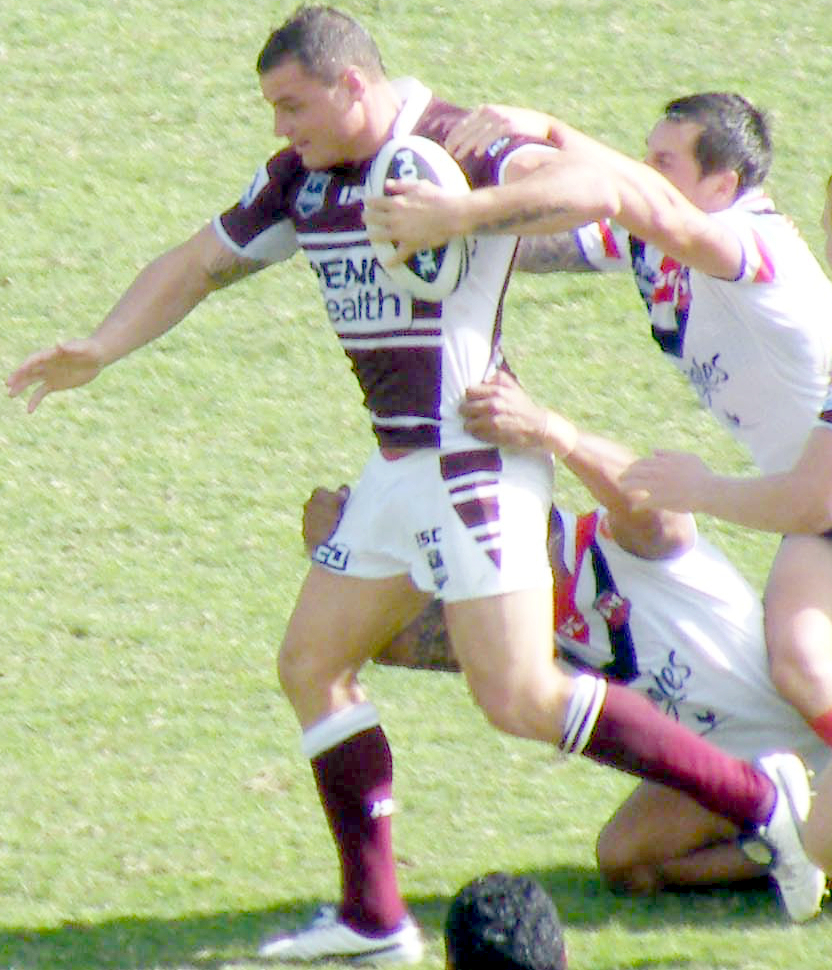

Personal information
- Full name: Anthony Thomas Watmough
- Born: 10 July 1983 (age 43) Auburn, New South Wales, Australia

Playing information
- Height: 183 cm (6 ft 0 in)
- Weight: 97 kg (15 st 4 lb)
- Position: Second-row, Lock
Club
Years	Team	Pld	T	G	FG	P
2002	Northern Eagles	8	1	0	0	4
2003–14	Manly Sea Eagles	278	71	0	0	284
2015	Parramatta Eels	17	1	0	0	4
	Total	303	73	0	0	292
Representative
Years	Team	Pld	T	G	FG	P
2005–07	City Origin	2	1	0	0	4
2005–14	New South Wales	14	1	0	0	4
2008–13	Australia	16	0	0	0	0
2010–12	NRL All Stars	2	0	0	0	0

Anthony Watmough (born 10 July 1983) is an Australian former professional rugby league footballer. An Australian international and New South Wales State of Origin representative forward, he played the majority of his career with the Manly-Warringah Sea Eagles, winning both the 2008 NRL Premiership and the 2011 NRL Premiership with them.

== Playing career ==
=== 2000s ===
A product of the Narrabeen Sharks, Watmough first played in the NRL in 2002 for the Northern Eagles club. In 2005, Watmough was first selected for the New South Wales State of Origin team. Watmough was awarded the 2007 Dally M Second Rower of the Year award. He played in the 2007 NRL grand final defeat by the Melbourne Storm. He played in the 2008 NRL Grand Final victory over the Melbourne Storm and was then named in the Australian squad for the 2008 Rugby League World Cup.

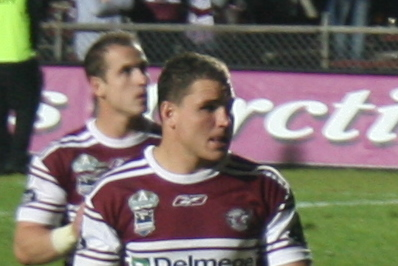
Watmough in 2008

After being involved in an alleged incident where Watmough abused a club sponsors 21-year-old daughter and then punched the sponsor at the club's 2009 season launch, Watmough started the following season in good form, winning the man-of-the-match award for his two-try performance in Manly's victory in the 2009 World Club Challenge. He was selected for Australia in the one-off test match against New Zealand on 8 May 2009.

Watmough gave a dominant display to earn the man of the match award in game 3 of the 2009 State of Origin series in what was described by commentator Andrew Voss as one of the greatest ever Origin performances. He won his second Dally M Second-Rower of The Year award for the 2009 season and in doing so made sure Manly retained the award for the third year in a row as his teammate Glenn Stewart won it the year before and Watmough won it in 2007. In the 3-year period from the start of 2008 season, Watmough was penalised in games 70 times, the most of any player in the NRL. To add, he had recently been caught urinating on a shopfront which caused a fan fume uproar.

=== 2010s ===
For the 2010 ANZAC Test, Watmough was selected to play for Australia from the interchange bench in their victory against New Zealand. 2011 was seen as a turnaround for Anthony Watmough both on and off the field. Off-field, Manly coach Des Hasler enlisted the help of his 1987 and 1996 premiership coach, Rugby League Immortal and club legend Bob Fulton whose private talk with Watmough put the 27-year-old back on the straight and narrow while his on-field form for the second placed Manly club saw him return to the NSW Origin team for games 2 and 3 of the 2011 State of Origin series.

However, before the end of the season, reports emerged of another off-field transgression, with Watmough accused of trashing a hotel room after a State of Origin victory.

In the 2012 State of Origin series, Watmough was the only New South Wales player who had ever experienced a series victory. Watmough was selected for Australia in the 2013 ANZAC Test and played from the interchange bench. In what was the first test match ever played in Canberra, New Zealand were defeated.

On 28 October 2014, after a couple months of speculation of Watmough making a move to the Parramatta Eels, he was released from Manly-Warringah to sign a four-year deal with the Eels starting from the 2015 NRL season.

Following his first full season with the Parramatta club in 2015, with some time off the field due to injury, Watmough entered the 2016 NRL season with the club aiming for a premiership. It was early in the 2016 NRL season that he suffered a recurring knee injury which saw him sidelined once again.

It was also early into 2016 which saw the club entangled in salary-cap related controversy, and following a lengthy investigation, the NRL deemed Parramatta to be non-compliant with the salary cap - the club was docked 12 competition points, and ordered to become compliant to be able to play for competition points over the remainder of the season.

This led to the club needing to move players on, and with Watmough having been rumored to be looking to retire due to injury earlier on in the season, this was something the club would want to make use of to become compliant.

It was on 12 May 2016 that Watmough's medical retirement was given the green light by the NRL.

== Statistics ==
Year	Team	Games	Tries	Pts
2002	Northern Eagles	8	1	4
2003	Manly Warringah Sea Eagles	24	10	40
2004	Manly Warringah Sea Eagles	21	4	16
2005	Manly Warringah Sea Eagles	19	10	40
2006	Manly Warringah Sea Eagles	23	2	8
2007	Manly Warringah Sea Eagles	26	12	48
2008†	Manly Warringah Sea Eagles	22	8	32
2009	Manly Warringah Sea Eagles	23	8	32
2010	Manly Warringah Sea Eagles	24	4	16
2011†	Manly Warringah Sea Eagles	24	5	20
2012	Manly Warringah Sea Eagles	27	3	12
2013	Manly Warringah Sea Eagles	25	4	16
2014	Manly Warringah Sea Eagles	20	1	4
2015	Parramatta Eels	17	1	4
	Totals	303	73	292

== Post playing ==
On 13 June 2018, Watmough accused Manly captain Daly Cherry-Evans of holding Manly back over his financial demands. Watmough claimed that Cherry-Evans had turned into a "fuckwit" after the halfback's first season with the club in 2011, when they won the NRL premiership. Watmough said, "He just signed a four-year deal and he didn’t turn up to training. He said his manager told him not to. His idiot manager signed him for five years on no money because nobody thought he was good. In the end, [coach] Geoff Toovey succumbed to the board and [Cherry-Evans] was put on $500,000 after being on $50,000. Toovey chose the board and one player over the rest of the players and that’s where he lost me".

In 2024 Watmough coached in the Sydney Shield for the fourth tier men's competition.
