= Thierry Alibert =

French rugby league referee

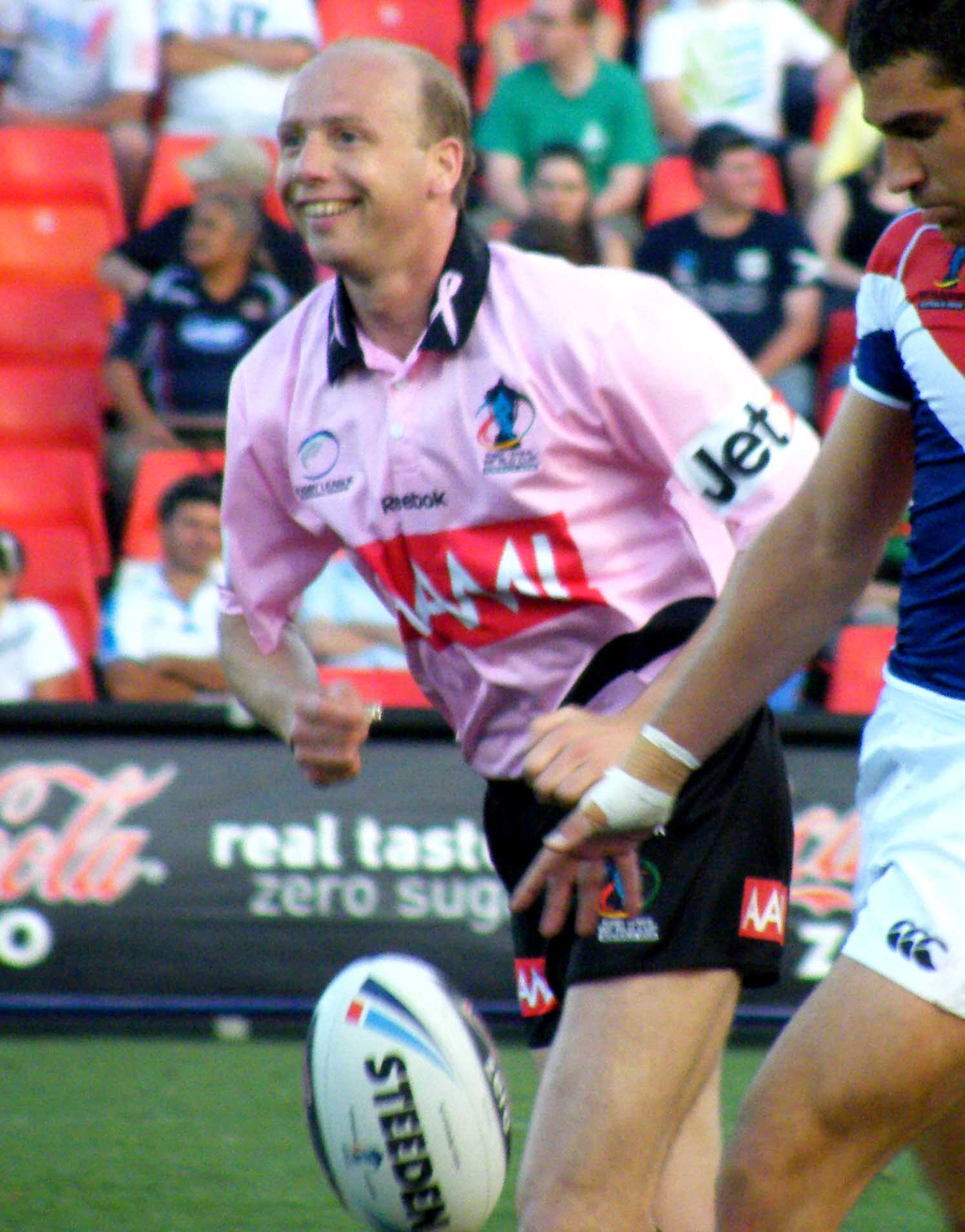

Personal information
- Born: 27 December 1970 (age 55) Toulouse, France

Refereeing information
Years	Competition	Apps
2008–	Super League	28
2007–	Challenge Cup	6
1997	Internationals	12
- Source: As of 14 October 2009

Thierry Alibert was a professional rugby league referee.

Alibert was a full-time professional referee, under jurisdiction from the Rugby Football League, and took charge of Super League games, as well as selected Challenge Cup and international games as one of the Rugby Football League's Full Time Match Officials. Alibert got his opportunity to step up to full-time professionalism with the return of the referee Ashley Klein to his native Australia.

He has refereed in two Rugby League World Cup group matches, in 2000 and 2008. He was put forward as a neutral referee for the Four Nations match between England and Australia on 31 October 2009. However, the Australian Rugby League stated their desire for a more experienced referee, and the match was officiated upon by England's Steve Ganson.

Alibert stepped down from super league in 2013.

== Rugby League World Cup ==
2000

- England 66-10 Fiji
- Wales 38-6 Cook Islands

2008

- Ireland 38-20 Samoa
- Samoa 42-10 France

== International ==
Thierry has refereed:

- Wales vs England on 17 October 2009.
- He has refereed Lebanon vs Italy on 24 October 2009 in the Rugby League European Cup.
- He has refereed Wales vs Ireland on 1 November 2009 in the Rugby League European Cup.
- He has refereed England vs NZ on 7 November 2009 in the 4 Nations.
