= Sam Perrett =

NZ international rugby league footballer

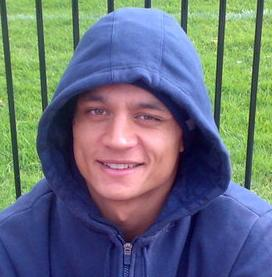

Personal information
- Full name: Atawhai Samuel Perrett
- Born: 14 May 1985 (age 41) Auckland, New Zealand
- Height: 182 cm (6 ft 0 in)
- Weight: 92 kg (14 st 7 lb)

Playing information
- Position: Wing, Fullback, Centre
Club
Years	Team	Pld	T	G	FG	P
2004–12	Sydney Roosters	148	45	0	0	180
2012–16	Canterbury Bulldogs	108	48	1	0	194
	Total	256	93	1	0	374
Representative
Years	Team	Pld	T	G	FG	P
2007–13	New Zealand	21	12	0	0	48
- Source: As of 2 July 2016
- Relatives: Lloyd Perrett (brother)

Sam Perrett (born 14 May 1985), also known by the nickname of "Pez"' or "Sammy", is a New Zealand former professional rugby league footballer. A representative for New Zealand at international level, he was a versatile back who was capable of playing on the wing, in the centres and at fullback. He played for the Sydney Roosters and the Canterbury-Bankstown Bulldogs in the National Rugby League (NRL). Perrett was a member of the World Cup winning New Zealand team in 2008.

== Early life ==
Perrett, of Māori and European and Samoan descent, was born on 14 May 1985 in Auckland, New Zealand. He moved to Australia when he was 13. He is a member of the Church of Jesus Christ of Latter-day Saints.

== NRL career ==
=== Sydney Roosters ===
While attending Palm Beach Currumbin High School in 2003, Perrett was selected to play for the Australian Schoolboys team.

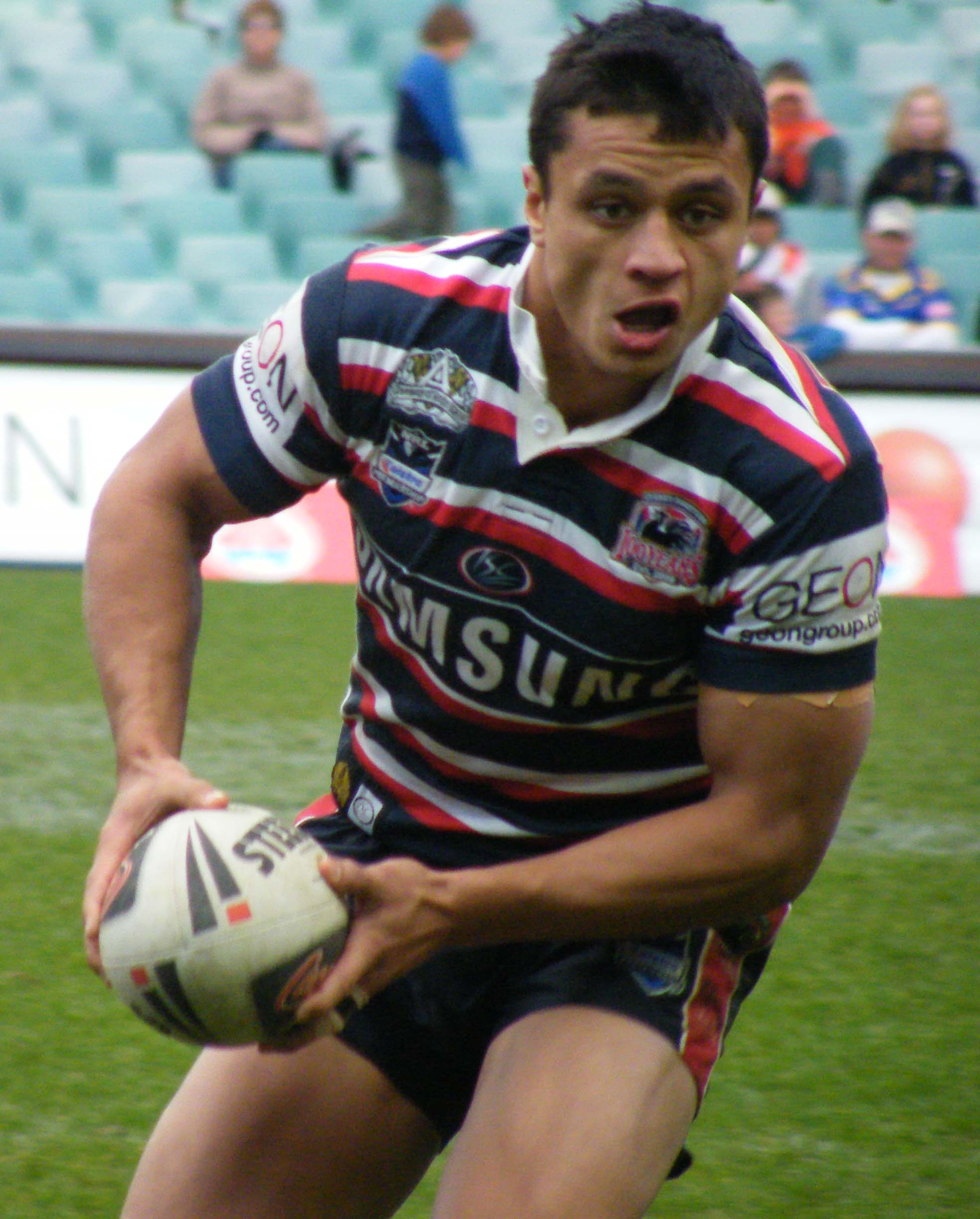
Perrett playing for the Roosters in 2008

A Gold Coast junior, Perrett came to the Sydney Roosters ahead of the 2004 season. It was in round 15 of the 2004 season that he made his first grade debut, playing on the wing against the Newcastle Knights at Aussie Stadium. Perrett had an "impressive" debut in a 48–4 victory to the Roosters, however during the match he sustained an ankle injury and was forced to come off the field in the 54th minute. The ankle injury kept Perrett out for six weeks, however he didn't make another appearance for the Roosters all season. Perrett also played a limited role in the 2005 season, only playing three matches for the Roosters. Despite his few appearances, Perrett was still able to cross for his maiden first grade try, with a double in the Roosters' final round victory over Canterbury.

While the 2006 season was a poor one for the Bondi-based outfit, it was considered Perrett's breakthrough season as he played 17 matches, scoring seven tries. Playing the entire season on the wing, Perrett scored a double against the Cronulla-Sutherland Sharks in Round 19 and his first career hat-trick in Round 23 against the Penrith Panthers. The 2007 season was one of improvement for Perrett as he played each of the Rooster's 24 games, scoring nine tries. He alternated between playing wing and centre for a majority of the season, however moved to fullback under the guidance of new Roosters' coach Brad Fittler in the latter part of the season, filling in for the injured Anthony Minichiello. His performances throughout the season were strong enough that he was selected as in the New Zealand squad for the historic 2007 All Golds Tour.

In the 2008 season it was announced that Perrett had signed a contract extension with the Sydney Roosters, keeping him at the club until at least the end of 2012. Perrett ran 3,720 metres with the ball in 2008, more than any other player in the competition.

In the 2009 NRL season, Perrett played almost every game for the club as they endured a horror year on the field finishing last for first time since 1966.

In 2010, Perrett made 27 appearances and scored nine tries as the Sydney Roosters reached the 2010 NRL Grand Final against St. George. Perrett played on the wing as the club were defeated 32–8 at ANZ Stadium.

=== Canterbury-Bankstown Bulldogs ===
In 2012 Perrett joined the Canterbury-Bankstown Bulldogs mid-season. Perrett played on the wing for Canterbury in the 2012 NRL Grand Final loss against Melbourne.

In 2014, Perrett played 24 games for Canterbury including the 2014 NRL Grand Final loss against South Sydney. This was Perrett's third grand final loss as a player.

In 2016 against the Sydney Roosters, Sam Perrett played his 250th NRL game. Coincidentally against his former club.

In what would be his last NRL game, he scored the final try in the elimination final as Canterbury lost 12–28 to the Penrith Panthers.

He made headlines the day after his final career game, by dressing up as The Rock in his teams Mad Monday celebrations.

== International career ==
Despite having played for the Australian Schoolboys, Queensland Schoolboys and New South Wales Under 19s in his junior career, Perrett swore his allegiance to New Zealand. Perrett got his first taste of senior international football playing for New Zealand A against an Australian Invitational team in a curtain raiser to a 2006 Tri-Nations match.

In October 2006 he was announced in the Kiwis Tri-Nations squad but did not go on to play any games in the series. A year later he was selected in the All Golds side to play Northern Union in the centenary test between the side and after a good performance in that game he was then selected for the New Zealand side against Great Britain in both the first and second test.

Perrett was named in the New Zealand squad for the 2008 Rugby League World Cup which New Zealand won, defeating Australia in dramatic fashion. For the 2010 Anzac Test, Perrett was selected to play for New Zealand on the wing in their loss against Australia. Perrett was named on the 2010 New Zealand squad for the Four nations, in which New Zealand also won, beating Australia with two tries late on in the final.

For the 2013 Anzac Test, Perrett was selected to play for New Zealand on the wing in their loss against Australia.

== Personal life ==
Perrett is the older brother of fellow Canterbury-Bankstown Bulldogs player Lloyd Perrett.

After retiring, Perrett set up a construction company.
