= International rugby league in 2009 =

This is a list of international rugby league matches played throughout 2009. A † denotes a recognised, but unofficial match that did not contribute to the IRL World Rankings.

== May ==
=== ANZAC Test ===
8 May 2009

Australia	38 – 10	New Zealand
Tries: Justin Hodges (2); Johnathan Thurston (2); Darius Boyd; Israel Folau; Billy Slater; Goals: Johnathan Thurston (5/7)		Tries: Sam Perrett; Manu Vatuvei Goals: Benji Marshall (1/2)

Suncorp Stadium, Brisbane
Attendance: 37,152
Referee: Richard Silverwood (England)
Player of the Match: Johnathan Thurston

== June ==
=== France vs England ===
13 June 2009

France	12 – 66	England
	Report

Stade Jean-Bouin, Paris
Attendance: 7,600

== October ==
=== New Zealand vs Tonga ===
14 October 2009

New Zealand	40 – 24	Tonga
Tries: Benji Marshall (2); Bryson Goodwin (2); Junior Sa'u; Sam Perrett; Nathan Fien; Steve Matai; Goals: Issac Luke (3); Benji Marshall (1)	Report	Tries: Etuate Uaisele (2); Feleti Mateo; Sam Huihahau; Viliami Mataka Goals: Eddie Paea (2)

Rotorua International Stadium, Rotorua, New Zealand
Attendance: 8,000
Referee: Leon Williamson (New Zealand)
Player of the Match: Benji Marshall

=== Wales vs England ===
17 October 2009

Wales	12 – 48	England
Tries: Craig Kopczak; Ian Watson Goals: Lloyd White (2)	Report	Tries: Sam Tomkins (3); Tom Briscoe (2); Louie McCarthy-Scarsbrook; Sam Burgess; Sean O'Loughlin; Adrian Morley; Goals: Paul Sykes (6)

Brewery Field, Bridgend, Wales
Attendance: 3,249
Referee: Thierry Alibert (France)
Player of the Match: Sam Tomkins

=== European Cup ===
==== Group 1 ====
17 October 2009

Italy	0 - 104	Scotland
	Report	Try: Nixon (4); Steel (2); Henderson (2); Fletcher (2); Benn (2); Nanyn (2); Paterson; Moore; Cox; Fisher; Goal: Nanyn (16)

Stadio Plebiscito, Padova, Italy
Attendance: 2,139
Referee: Steve Ganson (England)

24 October 2009

Lebanon
Tries: T. Robinson (2)
Ellaz
Saleh (4)
Mansour
R. Robinson (3)
Clark, Harb (2)
El Helou

Goals: Ndeira (12)
Clark

86 - 0
Report

Italy

International Olympic Stadium, Tripoli, Lebanon
Attendance: 2,100
Referee: Thierry Alibert (France)

1 November 2009

Scotland	22 - 10	Lebanon
	Report

Hughenden Stadium, Glasgow, Scotland
Attendance: 1,000
Referee: Leon Williamson (New Zealand)

==== Group 2 ====
18 October 2009

Ireland	82 - 0	Serbia
Try: Fitzpatrick (4); Ambler (2); Bergin (2); Coleman; Finn; Allen; Hesketh; Harrison; Guilfoyle; Goal: Finn (9); Hesketh (4)	Report

Spollanstown, Tullamore, Ireland
Attendance: 295
Referee: Leon Williamson (New Zealand)

25 October 2009

Serbia	8 - 88	Wales
Try: Putkin; Goals: Brkic (2)	Report	Tries: Roets (3); James (2); Divorty (2); R. Williams (2); Kear; Thomas; L. Williams; Bateman; Watson; Goals: Webster (14)

FK Smederevo Stadium, Smederevo, Serbia
Attendance: 93
Referee: Shayne Hayne (Australia)

1 November 2009

Wales
Try: Ian Webster
Lee Williams
Rhys Williams
Ashley Bateman
Geraint Davies
Jordan James
Elliot Kear
Gil Dudson

Goal: Lloyd White (5)

42 - 12
Report

Ireland
Try: Marcus St Hilaire
Liam Finn

Goal: Pat Richards (2)

Sardis Road, Pontypridd, Wales
Attendance: 2,143
Referee: Thierry Alibert (France)

==== Fifth place playoff ====
08-11-2009

Italy
Try: Falcone (28, 65, 76)

Vicelich (30, 37, 69) Nasso (39)

Goals: Veronese 7/7

42 - 14
Report

Serbia
Try: Brkić (13)

Vukanović (16, 44)

Goals: Brkić 1/3

Maesteg, Wales
Attendance: TBA
Referee: Phil Bentham (England)

==== Third place playoff ====
08-11-2009

Lebanon
Tries: Saleh (2)

Mansour (9) Travis Robinson (12, 27) Clark (22) Reece Robinson (40, 75) Chiha (48) Goals: Clark (0/2) Reece Robinson (4/5) Travis Robinson (0/1)

40 - 16
Report

Ireland
Tries: Haley (30, 36)

Beswick (64) Goals: Finn 2/3

Brewery Field, Bridgend, Wales
Attendance: 1,608
Referee: Steve Ganson (England)

==== Final ====
08-11-2009

Scotland	16 - 28	Wales
	Report

Brewery Field, Bridgend, Wales
Attendance: 1,608
Referee: Shayne Hayne (Australia)
Player of the Match: Elliot Kear

=== Pacific Cup ===
==== Qualifying ====
17 October 2009
19:30

Cook Islands	22–20	Samoa
Tries: Makimare (2), Fepuleai, Ngaro; Goals: Takairangi (3)	Report	Tries: Ah Van (2), Hansen, Taulapapa; Goals: Mata'utia (2)

Barlow Park, Cairns
Attendance: 4,261

==== Semifinals ====
24 October 2009

Cook Islands	24–22	Fiji
Tries: Fepuleai (2), Peyroux (2), Ngaro; Goals: Fepuleai (2)	Report	Tries: Uate (2), Ratu, Waqa; Goals: W. Naiqama (3)

Lloyd Robson Oval, Port Moresby
Attendance: 3,269
Referee: Phil Haines (Australia)

25 October 2009

Papua New Guinea	44–14	Tonga
Tries: Mead (2), Yere (2), Chan, Kui, Parker, Wabo; Goals: Wilshere (6)	Report	Tries: Tongia (2), Vea; Goals: Paea

Lloyd Robson Oval, Port Moresby
Attendance: 9,813
Referee: Chris James (Australia)

==== Third place Playoff ====
31 October 2009

Fiji	26–16	Tonga
Tries: Ravueta (2), Uate (2), Divavesi; Goals: W. Naiqama (3)	Report	Tries: Faʻaoso (2), Taufaʻao; Goals: Maile, Paea

Lloyd Robson Oval, Port Moresby
Attendance: 2,000
Referee: Shane Rehm (New Zealand)

==== Final ====
1 November 2009

Papua New Guinea	42–14	Cook Islands
Tries: Mead (3), Kambo, Yere, Kui; Goals: Wilshere (5)	Report	Tries: Fepuleai, Lulia, Peyroux; Goals: Taia

Lloyd Robson Oval, Port Moresby
Attendance: 10,151
Referee: Chris James (Australia)

=== Four Nations ===
==== Standings ====
2009 Four Nations
Pos	Team	Pld	W	D	L	PF	PA	PD	Pts	Qualification
1	Australia	3	2	1	0	88	40	+48	5	Qualification for Final
2	England	3	2	0	1	70	50	+20	4	Qualification for Final
3	New Zealand	3	1	1	1	94	52	+42	3	
4	France	3	0	0	3	28	138	−110	0	

Source: Gillette Four Nations

==== Round one ====
===== England vs France =====
Friday, 23 October
2000 BST

England	34 – 12	France
Tries: Richard Myler (2); Lee Smith; Kevin Sinfield; Ryan Hall; Tom Briscoe; Goals: Kevin Sinfield (5)	Report; Team lists	Tries: Vincent Duport; Kane Bentley Goals: Thomas Bosc (2)

Keepmoat Stadium, Doncaster, England
Attendance: 11,529
Referee: Leon Williamson (New Zealand)
Player of the Match: Gareth Ellis

===== Australia vs New Zealand =====
Saturday, 24 October
2000 BST

New Zealand	20 – 20	Australia
Tries: Frank-Paul Nuuausala; Junior Sa'u; Lance Hohaia; Frank Pritchard; Goals: Bryson Goodwin (2)	Report; Team lists	Tries: Brett Morris; Johnathan Thurston; Cameron Smith Goals: Johnathan Thurston (4)

Twickenham Stoop, London, England
Attendance: 12,360
Referee: Steve Ganson (England)
Player of the Match: Lance Hohaia

==== Round two ====
===== England vs Australia =====
Saturday, 31 October
1430 GMT

England	16 – 26	Australia
Tries: Sam Burgess; Gareth Ellis; Lee Smith Goals: Kevin Sinfield (1); Lee Smith (1)	Report	Tries: Billy Slater (2); Darren Lockyer; Greg Inglis; Brett Morris; Goals: Johnathan Thurston (3)

DW Stadium, Wigan, England
Attendance: 23,122
Referee: Steve Ganson (England)
Player of the Match: Greg Inglis

===== France vs New Zealand =====
Saturday, 31 October
1800 CET

France	12 – 62	New Zealand
Tries: Sébastien Martins; James Wynne Goals: Thomas Bosc (2)	Report	Tries: Sam Perrett (3); Lance Hohaia (2); Jared Waerea-Hargreaves (2); Benji Marshall; Frank-Paul Nuuausala; Junior Sa'u; Bryson Goodwin; Goals: Bryson Goodwin (9)

Stade Ernest-Wallon, Toulouse, France
Attendance: 12,412
Referee: Shayne Hayne (Australia)
Player of the Match: Sam Perrett

==== Round three ====
===== France vs Australia =====
Saturday, 7 November
1530 CET

France	4 – 42	Australia
Tries: Olivier Elima Goals:	Report	Tries: Michael Jennings (3); Brett Morris (2); Josh Morris (2); Luke Lewis; Goals: Johnathan Thurston (3); Kurt Gidley (2)

Stade Sébastien Charléty, Paris, France
Attendance: 6,234
Referee: Leon Williamson (New Zealand)
Player of the Match: Michael Jennings

===== England vs New Zealand =====
Saturday, 7 November
1800 GMT

England	20 – 12	New Zealand
Tries: Peter Fox (2); Kyle Eastmond; Goals: Kevin Sinfield (4)	Report	Tries: Bryson Goodwin; Ben Matulino; Goals: Bryson Goodwin (2)

Galpharm Stadium, Huddersfield, England
Attendance: 19,390
Referee: Thierry Alibert (France)
Player of the Match: Kevin Sinfield

==== Final ====
Saturday, 14 November
1930 GMT

England	16 – 46	Australia
Tries: Sam Burgess (2); Peter Fox Goals: Kevin Sinfield (2/3)	Report	Tries: Billy Slater (3); Brett Morris (2); Greg Inglis; Jarryd Hayne; Cameron Smith; Goals: Johnathan Thurston (7/9)

Elland Road, Leeds, England
Attendance: 31,042
Referee: Leon Williamson (New Zealand)
Player of the Match: Johnathan Thurston
