= 2009 Pacific Cup =

Rugby league competition in Port Moresby, Papua New Guinea

- Number of teams: 5
- Host country: Papua New Guinea
- Winner: Papua New Guinea
- Matches played: 5
- Attendance: 29,494 (5,899 per match)
- Points scored: 156 (31.2 per match)
- Tries scored: 28 (5.6 per match)
- Top scorer: (Papua New Guinea) John Wilshere (22)
- Top try scorer: (Papua New Guinea) David Mead (5)

The 2009 Pacific Cup, known as the 2009 SP Brewery Pacific Cup due to sponsorship, was a rugby league competition held in Port Moresby, Papua New Guinea. The competing teams were the Cook Islands, Fiji, Papua New Guinea, Samoa, Tonga.

Tonga, Fiji and PNG had their places in the draw confirmed initially, with the Cook Islands defeating Samoa in a Pacific Cup qualifier in Cairns on 17 October 2009 to decide which team took the final place in the tournament.

The four Pacific Cup matches were played at Lloyd Robson Oval on 24–25 October and 31 October. The Pacific Cup final was played on 1 November 2009 between Papua New Guinea and the Cook Islands. By winning the 2009 Pacific Cup, Papua New Guinea won the right to compete in the 2010 Four Nations tournament.

Brian Canavan was appointed as tournament director by the Rugby League International Federation (RLIF).

== Matches ==
=== Qualifying ===
17 October 2009
19:30

Cook Islands	22–20	Samoa
Tries: Makimare (2), Fepuleai, Ngaro; Goals: Takairangi (3)	Report	Tries: Ah Van (2), Hansen, Taulapapa; Goals: Mata'utia (2)

Barlow Park, Cairns
Attendance: 4,261

=== Semifinals ===
24 October 2009

Cook Islands	24–22	Fiji
Tries: Fepuleai (2), Peyroux (2), Ngaro; Goals: Fepuleai (2)	Report	Tries: Uate (2), Ratu, Waqa; Goals: W. Naiqama (3)

Lloyd Robson Oval, Port Moresby
Attendance: 3,269
Referee: Phil Haines (Australia)

25 October 2009

Papua New Guinea	44–14	Tonga
Tries: Mead (2), Yere (2), Chan, Kui, Parker, Wabo; Goals: Wilshere (6)	Report	Tries: Tongia (2), Vea; Goals: Paea

Lloyd Robson Oval, Port Moresby
Attendance: 9,813
Referee: Chris James (Australia)

=== Third place Playoff ===
31 October 2009

Fiji	26–16	Tonga
Tries: Ravueta (2), Uate (2), Divavesi; Goals: W. Naiqama (3)	Report	Tries: Faʻaoso (2), Taufaʻao; Goals: Maile, Paea

Lloyd Robson Oval, Port Moresby
Attendance: 2,000
Referee: Shane Rehm (New Zealand)

=== Final ===
1 November 2009

Papua New Guinea	42–14	Cook Islands
Tries: Mead (3), Kambo, Yere, Kui; Goals: Wilshere (5)	Report	Tries: Fepuleai, Lulia, Peyroux; Goals: Taia

Lloyd Robson Oval, Port Moresby
Attendance: 10,151
Referee: Chris James (Australia)

== Telecast Details ==
The Pacific Cup was shown in the UK, Australia, and throughout the Pacific.

- In Australia all matches were broadcast by NRL.com while the Nine Network showed a one-hour highlight package each weekend.
- In Britain matches were broadcast on BSkyB.
- FM100 radio broadcast to Papua New Guinea and the Pacific.
- In Papua New Guinea EM TV broadcast terrestrially to more than half of the population.
- Fiji TV broadcast the games in Fiji on its free to air service Fiji One and on its Sky Pacific platform to the rest of the Pacific Region.

== Squads ==
=== Mate Ma'a Tonga ===
Tonga played a Pacific Cup warm up match against New Zealand. New Zealand defeated Tonga 40–24 in what was a strong performance by the Tongans as they prepared for their Pacific Cup opener against Papua New Guinea.

- Coach: Rohan Smith

Club Team	Players
Bulldogs	Paki Afu
Penrith Panthers	Andrew Emelio
Newcastle Knights	Richard Fa'aoso, Sione Tovo
Canberra Raiders	Sam Huihahau
Papakura Sea Eagles	Toshio Laiseni
Wakefield Trinity Wildcats	Tevita Leo-Latu
Hull	Epalahame Lauaki, Sam Moa, Willie Manu
New Zealand Warriors	Siuatonga Likiliki, Ukuma Ta'ai
Melbourne Storm	Pita Maile
Parramatta Eels	Feleti Mateo, Etuate Uaisele, Eliakim Uasi
Cronulla Sharks	Eddie Paea, Atelea Vea, Siosia Vave, Inoke Tapa'atoutai
South Australian Rugby	Joel Taufa'ao
Manly-Warringah Sea Eagles	Tony Williams, Junior Palau

=== Cook Islands ===
Coach: David Fairleigh (Parramatta Eels)

Club Team	Players
Sydney Roosters	Anthony Gelling, Sam Brunton
Penrith Panthers	Tinirau Arona, Geoff Daniela
Shellharbour Dragons	Daniel Fepuleai
Newcastle Knights	Johnathon Ford, Keith Lulia, Zane Tetevano
Newtown Jets	Tere Glassie
Brisbane Broncos	~~Alex Glenn~~
Melbourne Storm	Fred Makimare
Bulldogs	Joe Matapuku
North Sydney Bears	Vincent Ngaro
Gold Coast Titans	Dominique Peyroux
Wests Tigers	Manikura Tikinau
Eastern Suburbs Tigers	Ben Vaeau
South Sydney Rabbitohs	Brad Takairangi
Wynnum Manly Seagulls	Leon Panapa
Cronulla-Sutherland Sharks	John Viiga

- Alex Glenn was originally named but withdrew after a groin injury required surgery.

=== Toa Samoa ===
Coach: Willie Poching (Leeds Rhinos)

Club Team	Players
New Zealand Warriors	Patrick Ah Van
Cronulla Sharks	Jack Afamasaga, Terrence Seu Seu, Misi Taulapapa
Samoa Domestic	Paul Chan Tung, Tanielu Pasene, Lepupa Taulagi
Wigan Warriors	Harrison Hansen
Penrith Panthers	Masada Iosefa, Joseph Paulo
Leeds Rhinos	Kylie Leuluai
Salford City Reds	Phillip Leuluai
Newcastle Knights	Peter Mata'utia, Mark Taufua
St Helens R.F.C.	Francis Meli, Tony Puletua
St George Illawarra Dragons	Kyle Stanley
Eastern Suburbs Tigers	Albert Talipeau
Gold Coast Titans	Sam Tagataese
Sheffield Eagles	Tangi Ropati

=== Papua New Guinea Kumuls ===
Coach: Adrian Lam (Sydney Roosters)

Club Team	Players
Gold Coast Titans	David Mead
Wentworthville Magpies	Richard Kambo
Newtown Jets/Sydney Roosters	Tu’u Maori
Penrith Panthers	Keith Peters
Redcliffe Dolphins	James Nightingale
Northern Pride	Jay Aston, Rod Griffin
Crusaders	Jason Chan
Salford City Reds	John Wilshere
North Queensland Cowboys	Tyson Martin
Melbourne Storm	Joe Bond
Agmark Gurias	Dion Aiye, Rodney Pora, George Moni
SBS Muruks	Jessie Joe Parker, Anton Kui
Bintangor Lahanis	Sigfred Gande, Glen Nami
Hunslet Hawks	Charlie Wabo
Sheffield Eagles	Menzie Yere

=== Fiji Bati ===
Coach: Terry Gilogely

Club Team	Players
Police Sharks	Osea Sadrau, Jone Wesele
Lautoka Crushers	Iowane Divavesi
Southern Districts Rebels	Puna Rasaubale
Cabramatta Two Blues	Donas Gock
Moore Park Brumbies	Hamilton Hughes
Wentworthville Magpies	Lepani Waqa
Nadera Panthers	Sevanaia Koroi, Sitiveni Ralogaivau, Asaeli Saravaki
Newtown Jets	Ryan Millard
Newcastle Knights	Wes Naiqama, Kevin Naiqama, Akuila Uate
New Zealand Warriors	Meli Koliavu
Leeds Rhinos	Mike Ratu
Coral Coast Cowboys	Jone Macilai, Joe Ravueta, Alipate Tani, Kaliova Tani
