= Pacific Rim Championship =

2004 Pacific Rim Championship
- Number of teams: 6
- Host country: New Zealand
- Winner: Cook Islands (1st title)

The 2004 Pacific Rim Championship and the 2004 Pacific Cup was the 9th Pacific Cup, a rugby league tournament held between Pacific teams. The tournament was hosted in Auckland and for the first time split into two competitions; The Pacific Rim Championship between national teams and the Pacific Cup between Auckland-based selections. In the final of the Pacific Rim competition the Cook Islands defeated New Zealand Māori 46-6 while Samoa XIII defeated Tonga XIII 52–18 to win the Pacific Cup.

== Background ==
The tournament, organised by both the New Zealand Rugby League and Pacific Island Rugby League Association (PIRLA), was a revival of the Pacific Cup which had not been held since 1997 due to the Super League war. The aim of the Pacific Rim Championship was to promote awareness of the game in the region with a view to re-establishing international fixtures and full contact with the main nations Australia, Great Britain and New Zealand in the near future.

The teams that participated in the 2004 Pacific Rim competition were: Tonga, Fiji, New Zealand Māori, Niue, Samoa and the Cook Islands. The Pacific Cup included Auckland Māori, New Caledonia, Samoa XIII, Tonga XIII and two other teams.

The official opening was held as part of the pre-match programme for the Tri-Nations test match between Australia and the New Zealand Kiwis on 16 October. A colourful parade of flags representing the participating countries was led into the stadium in front of about 20,000 spectators before kick-off.

Matches were played at Waitemata Stadium, Ericsson Stadium and North Harbour Stadium.

== Squads ==
The Pacific Rim competition featured international and New Zealand based players while the Pacific Cup squads were limited to Auckland-based players with the exception of New Caledonia who sent a development squad.

=== Pacific Rim squads ===
==== New Zealand Māori ====
New Zealand Māori were coached by Tawera Nikau who was assisted by Terry Hermansson.

Player	Club
Sam Andrews	(New Zealand) Waicoa Bay Stallions
Kurt Cawdron	(New Zealand) Auckland Lions
Taite Daniels	(New Zealand) Northern Storm
Teteira Davis	(New Zealand) Wellington Orcas
Willy Henare	(New Zealand) Auckland Lions
Aoterangi Herangi	(New Zealand) Auckland Lions
Charlie Herekotukutuku	(New Zealand) Canterbury Bulls
Nathan Hohaia	(New Zealand) Taranaki Wildcats
Shane Wallacehoskin	(New Zealand) Taranaki Wildcats
Odell Manuel	(New Zealand) Auckland Lions
Tukua Matthews	(New Zealand) Waicoa Bay Stallions
Vern Moana-Mason	(New Zealand) Waicoa Bay Stallions
Glen Rota	(New Zealand) Auckland Lions
Peter Prime	(New Zealand) Northern Storm
Herewini Rangi	(New Zealand) Eastern Tornadoes
Kererua Savage	(New Zealand) Hawke's Bay Unicorns
Barry Tawera	(New Zealand) Waicoa Bay Stallions
Sonny Whakarau	(New Zealand) Central Falcons
Mike Whakatihi	(New Zealand) Central Falcons
Vince Whare	(New Zealand) Canterbury Bulls

==== Fiji ====
The Fijian squad was composed mainly of locally based players.

Player	Club
Isimeli Soqe	
Iowane Divavesi	
Lusio Tanoa	
Neori Ravono	
Saula Lalagavesi	
Saimoni Ralulu	
Toakula Tuqiri	
Alipate Tuinivata	
Saverio Matairakula	
Atekini Roko	
Sevanaia Koroi	
Asaeli Saravaki	
Marika Koroivui	
Lagilagi Golea	
Semesa Cadrakilagi	
Tevita Volavola	
Joji Nuidamu	
Jone Wesele	
Semisi Tora	

== Pacific Rim Competition ==
=== Pool A ===
17 October 2004

Māori	54 – 4	Niue
Tries: Herekotuku, Davis (3), Herangi (3), Savage, Hoskin, Whakatihi; Goals: Davis (7)		Tries: Peni

North Harbour Stadium, Auckland

19 October 2004

Samoa	36 – 18	Niue

Auckland

21 October 2004

Māori	70 – 10	Samoa
Try: Davis (3), Hohaia, Herekotukutuku, Moana-Mason, Herangi, Prime, Rangi, Savage, Whakatihi; Goal: Davis (13)		Try: Ropati, Tavita; Goal: Ropati

Ericsson Stadium, Auckland

=== Pool B ===
17 October 2004

Fiji	6 – 56	Tonga
Tries: Divavesi; Goals: Tinivata		Tries: Sete, Uaisele (2), Lilo (2), Tuli (2), Moa (2), Moala, Vainikolo; Goals: Lilo (6)

Auckland

19 October 2004

Cook Islands	18 – 10	Tonga
Try: B. Ford, N. Ford, Taia; Goal: Mataora (3)		Try: Sete, Taufaʻao; Goal: Lilo

Auckland

21 October 2004

Cook Islands	20 – 12	Fiji
Try: Epati, Glassie, Taia; Goal: Mataora (4)		Try: Saravaki, Soqe; Goal: Tinivata (2)

Auckland

=== Bowl Final ===
23 October 2004

Fiji	34 – 24	Niue
Try: Saravaki (2) Tora, Karaitiana, Koroi, Tanoa; Goal: Tanoa (4), Saravaki		Try: Ikinofo, Vasau, Pulesea, Pesene, Talafagi; Goal: Logopati (2)

North Harbour Stadium, Auckland

=== Grand Final ===
23 October 2004

Cook Islands	46 – 4	Māori
Try: B. Ford (3), N. Ford (2), Jeffries, Mitchell, Pritchard, Tuakura; Goal: Mataora (5)		Try: Prime

North Harbour Stadium, Auckland

== Pacific Cup ==
=== Pool A ===
17 October 2004

Samoa XIII	44 – 10	Auckland Māori

Auckland

18 October 2004

Auckland Māori	70 – 0	New Caledonia

Auckland

20 October 2004

Samoa XIII	76 – 0	New Caledonia

Auckland

=== Pool B ===
17 October 2004

Tonga XIII	22 – 17	Cook Islands XIII

Auckland

18 October 2004

Tonga XIII	22 – 18	American Samoa

Auckland

20 October 2004

Cook Islands XIII	28 – 12	American Samoa

Auckland

=== Final ===
23 October 2004

Samoa XIII	52 – 18	Tonga XIII

North Harbour Stadium, Auckland
