= Ngaro (disambiguation) =

Ngaro is a delicacy of the dead in a Māori legend.

Ngaro may also refer to:

== People ==
- Ngaro people, Aboriginal inhabitants of the Whitsunday Islands
  - Ngaro language, an extinct dialect spoken by the Ngaro people

== People with the surname ==
- Alfred Ngaro, New Zealand politician
- Vincent Ngaro, Cook Island rugby league player
