= Ganson =

Ganson is both a surname and a given name. Notable people with the name include:

Surname:

- Arthur Ganson (born 1955), American sculptor
- John Ganson (1818–1874), American lawyer and politician
- Josh Ganson (born 1998), English rugby league player
- Lewis Ganson (1913–1980), English magician
- Steve Ganson (born 1970), English rugby league referee

Given name:

- Ganson Purcell, American government official
