= Peyroux =

Peyroux may refer to:

- Madeleine Peyroux (born April 18, 1974), American jazz musician
- Dominique Peyroux (born 7 July 1988), New Zealand rugby league footballer
