= Taufaʻao =

Taufaʻao is a given name and a surname. Notable people with the name include:

- Joel Taufaʻao, Australian-born Tongan rugby league footballer
- Taufaʻao Filise (born 1977), Tongan rugby union footballer
