= 2006 Pacific Cup =

- Number of teams: 6
- Host country: New Zealand
- Winner: Tonga (2nd title)
- Matches played: 9

The 2006 Pacific Cup was the 10th Pacific Cup, a rugby league tournament held between Pacific teams. The tournament was hosted in Auckland and eventually won by Tonga, who defeated Fiji in the final. Fiji's Asaeli Saravaki was the Player of the Tournament.

== Squads ==
Tonga, Cook Islands, New Zealand Māori and Tokelau squads comprised players mainly involved in New Zealand’s domestic Bartercard Cup and lower grades.

The New Zealand Māori side was coached by Dean Clark and included Paul Atkins, Willie Heta, Darren Kingi, Jared Trott, Matt Wanoa and Steve Skinnon.

Tongan squad included Taniela Moa, Joel Taufa'ao, Enele Taufa, Kosilio Tonga'uiha, Makasini Richter, Ukuma Ta’ai, Willie Wolfgramm and Kimi Uasi.

The Cook Islands included Sam Mataora.

Tokelau replaced New Caledonia who pulled out a week before the tournament.

The Fijian squad was a mix of local and overseas based players . While the majority of players were converts from rugby union the team also included Alipate Tani and Semisi Tora.

Toa Samoa was the only team at the tournament to comprise entirely of indigenous local players. The intention of the Samoan Rugby League was to develop and expose local players with an eye to the 2008 World Cup qualifiers later in the year.

== Results ==
=== Pool A ===
	Team	Pld	W	D	L	PF	PA	PD	Pts
1	Tonga	2	2	0	0	106	14	92	4
2	Māori	2	1	0	1	78	46	32	2
3	Tokelau	2	0	0	2	4	128	-124	0

23 February 2006
1800 NZDT

Tonga	64 - 0	Tokelau
Try: M. Richter, S. Fotu, T. Moa, U. Uasi, P. Filimoehala (2), L. Faamara (2), L. Moala (3); Goal: J. Taufaao (9)

Ericsson Stadium No.2, Auckland
Attendance: 2000
Player of the Match: Leimoni Moala (Tonga)

26 February 2006
1430 NZDT

Tonga	42 - 14	Māori
Try: U. Uasi, M Richter (2), T. Moa (5); Goal: J. Taufa'ao (5)		Try: M. Wanoa, J. Limmer, D. Were; Goal: J. Trott (1)

Waitemata Stadium, Henderson
Attendance: 2000
Player of the Match: Aloisio Malangi (Tonga)

2 March 2006
1800 NZDT

Māori	64 - 4	Tokelau
Try: D. Laulu, W. Heta, J. Trott, S. Skinnon, H. Raihe, S. Kuru, P. Atkins (2) S. Hunter (2), J. Paikea (2); Goal: W. Heta (1), J. Trott (3), C. Motu (5)		Try: S. Manu

Ericsson Stadium No.2, Auckland
Attendance: 2000
Player of the Match: Paul Atkins (Māori)

=== Pool B ===
	Team	Pld	W	D	L	PF	PA	PD	Pts
1	Fiji	2	2	0	0	66	20	46	4
2	Cook Islands	2	1	0	1	60	40	20	2
3	Samoa	2	0	0	2	4	70	-66	0

23 February 2006
1930 NZDT

Fiji	26 - 4	Samoa
Try: M. Bainivalu, A. Saravaki, E. Naioko, A. Masikerei (2); Goal: A. Tani (3)		Try: S. Iosefo

Ericsson Stadium No.2, Auckland
Attendance: 2000
Player of the Match: Apisai Masikerei (Fiji)

26 February 2006
1300 NZDT

Fiji	40 - 16	Cook Islands
Try: M Koronui, S. Tora, S. Koronamara, A. Tani, A. Saravaki, C. Clarke, V. Baleilomaloma; Goal: A. Tani (6)		Try: J. Burgess, W. Vaeau, R. Enoka, T. Taia; Goal: W. Vaeau

Waitemata Stadium, Henderson
Attendance: 2000
Player of the Match: Asaeli Saravaki (Fiji)

2 March 2006
1930 NZDT

Cook Islands	44 - 0	Samoa
Try: N. Nga'a, J. Burgess, J. Tou, T. Raela, P. Russell (2), J. Taurarii (2), S. Mataora (2); Goal: S. Mataora (1), W. Vaeau (1)

Ericsson Stadium No.2, Auckland
Attendance: 2000
Player of the Match: Terry Taia (Cook Is)

=== Playoffs ===
==== Fifth place play-off ====
5 March 2006
1200 NZDT

Tokelau	34 - 28	Samoa
Try:P. Siaosi, J. Siaosi, A. Siagigi (2), J. Mataafa (2) Goal: A. Faafoi (5)		Try: I. Ioapo, F. Tavesi, G. Stowers, U. Saifoloi (2)Goal: T. Mataafa (3)

Waitemata Stadium, Henderson
Attendance: 2000
Player of the Match: Aukuso Faafoi (Tokelau)

==== Third place play-off ====
5 March 2006
1330 NZDT

Māori	40 - 14	Cook Islands
Try: P. Atkins, D. Trott, D. Laulu, M. Wanoa (2), J. Limmer (2); Goal: J. Trott (3), C. Motu (3)		Try: W. Vaeau, R. Enoka, J Burgess; Goal: S. Mataora (1)

Waitemata Stadium, Henderson
Attendance: 2000
Player of the Match: Steve Skinnon (Māori)

==== Final ====
5 March 2006
1500 NZDT

Tonga	22 - 4	Fiji
Try: S. Moa, E. Uasi, K. Fifita, W. Wolfgram; Goal: J. Taufaao (3)		Try: A. Masikerei

Waitemata Stadium, Henderson
Attendance: 2000
Player of the Match: Willie Wolfgramm (Tonga)
