= Kane Epati =

Cook Islands international rugby league footballer

Personal information
- Full name: Kane Epati
- Born: 13 August 1981 (age 43); Samoa
- Height: 6 ft 0 in (1.83 m)
- Weight: 15 st 10 lb (100 kg)

Playing information

Rugby league
- Position: Centre
Club
Years	Team	Pld	T	G	FG	P
2005	Hull Kingston Rovers	30	15	0	0	60
2006	Doncaster	20	9	0	0	36
2007–09	Dewsbury Rams	51	37	0	0	148
	Total	101	61	0	0	244
Representative
Years	Team	Pld	T	G	FG	P
2004	Cook Islands	1	0	0	0	0

Rugby union
Club
Years	Team	Pld	T	G	FG	P
	Castres Olympique	0	0	0	0	0

Kane Epati (born 13 August 1981 in Samoa) is a former semi-professional rugby league footballer. Originally a rugby union player in his native Samoa, he played Rugby league for Dewsbury Rams in Championship 1 in England following stints at Doncaster Lakers, Hull Kingston Rovers, where he was a non-playing member of the Northern Rail Cup–winning squad in 2005. He has Samoan-New Zealander ancestry.

Epati represented the Cook Islands at international level, and played in the team which won the 2004 Pacific Rim tournament.
