= Terry Hermansson =

New Zealand international rugby league footballer

Personal information
- Full name: Terry Brian Hermansson
- Born: 11 August 1967 (age 59) Christchurch, New Zealand

Playing information
- Height: 181 cm (5 ft 11 in)
- Weight: 110 kg (17 st 5 lb)
- Position: Prop
Club
Years	Team	Pld	T	G	FG	P
1991–92	Doncaster	21	5	0	0	20
1993–94	South Sydney	28	4	0	0	16
1995–97	Sydney City	66	5	0	0	20
1998	South Sydney	17	1	0	0	4
1999–00	Auckland Warriors	39	1	0	0	4
	Total	171	16	0	0	64
Representative
Years	Team	Pld	T	G	FG	P
1989–??	Canterbury
1994–99	New Zealand	4	1	0	0	4
1997	Rest of the World	1	0	0	0	0
2000	Aotearoa Māori	3	0	0	0	0

Terry Brian Hermansson, is a New Zealand former professional rugby league footballer. An international representative prop, he played club football in England, Australia and New Zealand.

== Playing career ==
Hermansson was a Schoolboy Kiwi in 1982 and made the Junior Kiwis in 1985.

Nicknamed "The Rock" he spent his early years playing for the Canterbury sides of the 1990s before moving overseas to play professionally, first for Doncaster in England and then for the South Sydney Rabbitohs in the then NSWRL Premiership. Hermansson played for Souths in their upset 1994 Tooheys Challenge Cup final victory over Brisbane.

At the height of the Super League war he moved to the Sydney City Roosters and played alongside fellow Kiwi prop Jason Lowrie. He returned to the South Sydney club in 1998 before signing for the Adelaide Rams for the 1999 NRL season.

When the Rams were closed down before the season he signed a two-year contract with the Auckland Warriors, returning home to play in front of the New Zealand fans. In 1999 he was Clubman of the Year Award.

== Representative career ==
Hermansson played for the New Zealand national rugby league team on four occasions between 1994 and 1999, with the Superleague war blocking him from making more appearances. During the war he played for an Australian Rugby League "Rest of the World" side that took on the Australian Kangaroos.

In 2000 he represented the Aotearoa Māori at the 2000 Rugby League World Cup. He retired in 2000 after the World Cup.

== Later years ==
On retirement, he returned to his native Christchurch and concentrated on coaching, winning several scholarships to improve his skills. He has coached the Canterbury under-18 side and in 2005 he coached the New Zealand under-16 side when they toured Australia.

In 2004 Hermansson was the assistant coach of the New Zealand Māori side in the Pacific Cup.
