= Steve Skinnon =

New Zealand rugby footballer

Personal information
- Born: 27 October 1976 (age 50)
- Height: 183 cm (6 ft 0 in)
- Weight: 95 kg (14 st 13 lb)

Playing information

Rugby union
- Position: Wing, first five-eighth
Club
Years	Team	Pld	T	G	FG	P
1996–97	Wellington
1999	Hawkes Bay
	Total	0	0	0	0	0

Rugby league
- Position: Wing, Prop, Second-row
Club
Years	Team	Pld	T	G	FG	P
2003	Sydney Roosters	1	0	0	0	0
2004	South Sydney	5	2	0	0	8
	Total	6	2	0	0	8
Representative
Years	Team	Pld	T	G	FG	P
2006	New Zealand Māori

Steve Skinnon (born 27 November 1976) is a New Zealand rugby footballer who played rugby union for Wellington and Hawkes Bay in the National Provincial Championship and rugby league for the Sydney Roosters and South Sydney Rabbitohs in the National Rugby League. He represented his country in both codes at a junior level.

== Early years ==
Skinnon started his career in rugby union and represented the New Zealand under 19 side in 1994 from Wellington College, playing at second five eighth. He switched codes to rugby league in 1995 and was picked to play for the Junior Kiwisfrom Harbour City Eagles Rugby League Club, completing a cross code double. Skinnon played at prop or second row in his early years.

== Rugby union career ==
Skinnon then returned to rugby union, playing in the National Provincial Championship for Wellington. He scored twice on his debut in 1996 against Taranaki, at the time being the only player to have achieved this feat for Wellington. In 1997 he was the victim of an eye-gouge by Troy Flavell that saw Flavell suspended from the game for a year.

By 1999 Skinnon was playing in the Second Division for the Hawkes Bay.

== Rugby league career ==
Skinnon then moved to Sydney and played rugby league for the Sydney Roosters in the NSWRL Premier League at prop. Later in the season he was given his first grade debut in the National Rugby League, on the wing.

In 2004 he moved to the South Sydney Rabbitohs and played in five NRL matches, coming off the bench as a forward in all of them.

He represented the New Zealand Māori in 2006, playing in the Pacific Cup.

== Return to union ==
Skinnon returned to New Zealand in mid-2006, in time for the club rugby season. He trialled with North Harbour for the NPC and ended up playing for Takapuna. In 2007 he moved to join the Ponsonby club where he has played for the last four seasons.

He has since represented Auckland Maori and New Zealand at the World Rugby Classic, a tournament for veteran players.
