= Monikura Tikinau =

Cook Islands international rugby league footballer

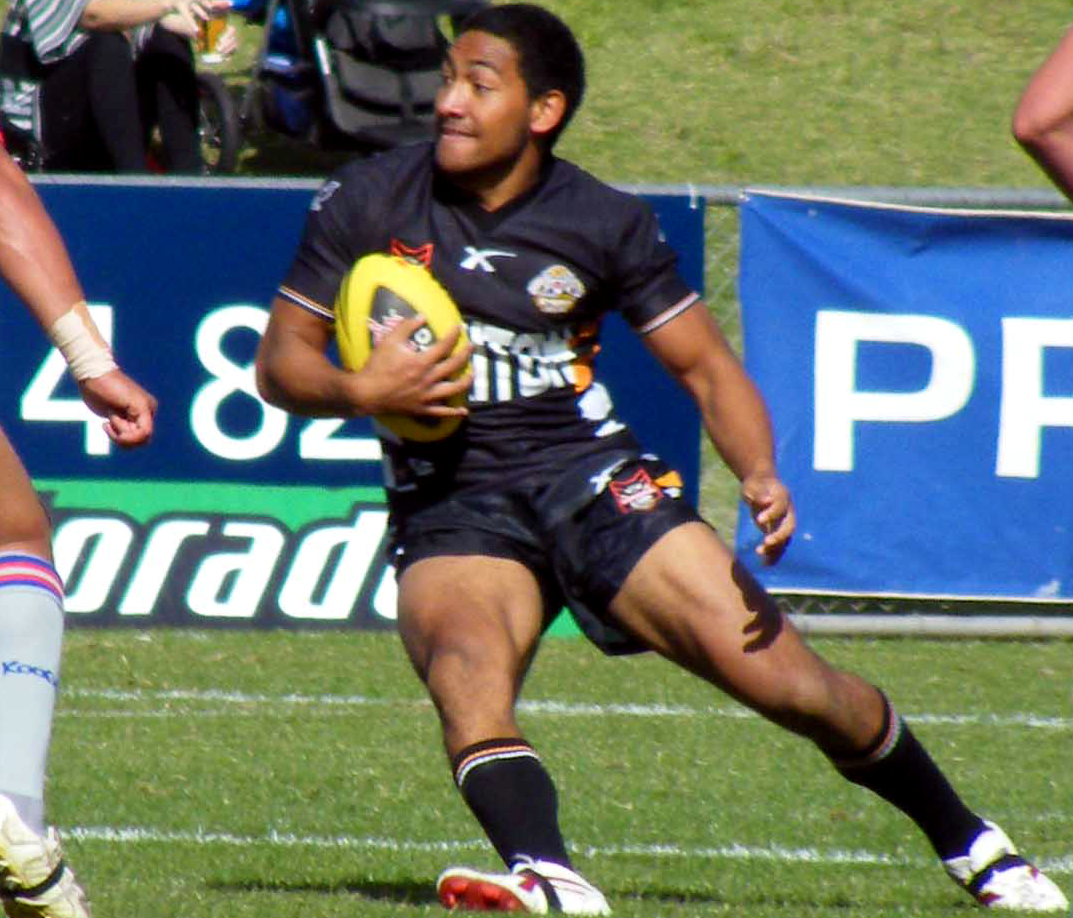

Personal information
- Born: 3 January 1990 (age 35) Auckland, New Zealand
- Height: 184 cm (6 ft 0 in)
- Weight: 94 kg (14 st 11 lb)

Playing information
Representative
Years	Team	Pld	T	G	FG	P
2009	Cook Islands	2	0	0	0	0

Monikura Tikinau (born 3 January 1990) is a New Zealand rugby league footballer who joined the Redcliffe Dolphins in 2011, and who played in the Queensland Cup. He plays on the wing.

He formerly played for the Wests Tigers in the Toyota Cup.

== Representative career ==
Tikinau is a Cook Islands international and was part of the Cook Islands team that lost the 2009 Pacific Cup grand final.
