= Puna Rasaubale =

Fijian boxer and rugby league footballer (born 1986)

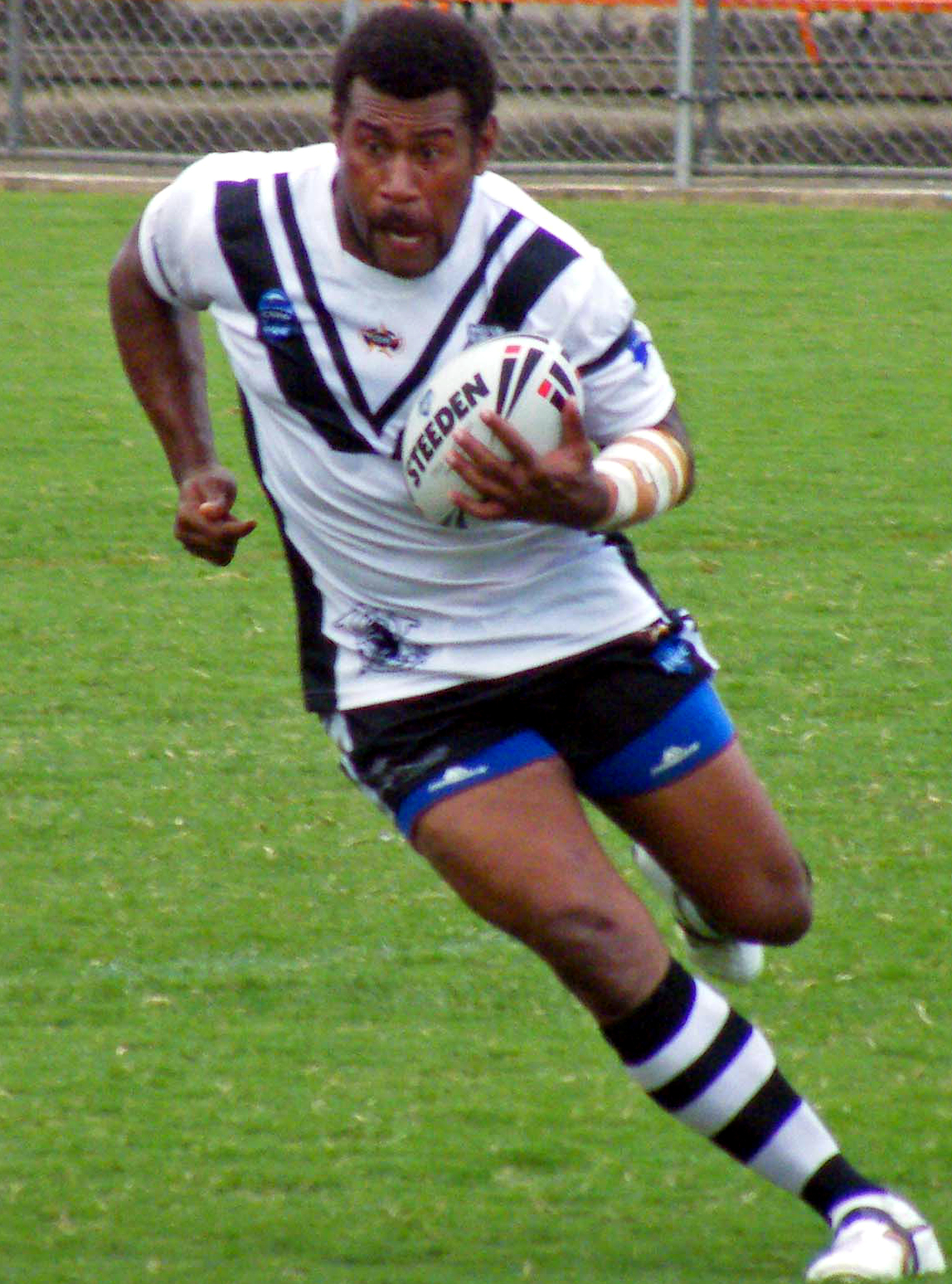

Personal information
- Full name: Taraiasi Nodrakoro Rasaubale
- Born: 21 December 1986 (age 39) Fiji
- Height: 5 ft 10 in (178 cm)

Playing information
- Position: Prop
Club
Years	Team	Pld	T	G	FG	P
2008	London Skolars	1
2009	Gateshead Thunder
	Total	1	0	0	0	0
Representative
Years	Team	Pld	T	G	FG	P
2009	Fiji	2	0	0	0	0
- Source: As of 14 September 2016

Taraiasi Nodrakoro "Puna" Rasaubale (born 21 December 1986) is a Fijian professional boxer and rugby league footballer. He has represented his country in boxing at the 2006 Commonwealth Games, and rugby league at the 2009 Pacific Cup as a prop.
