= Ukuma Taʻai =

Tonga international rugby league footballer

Ukuma Taai
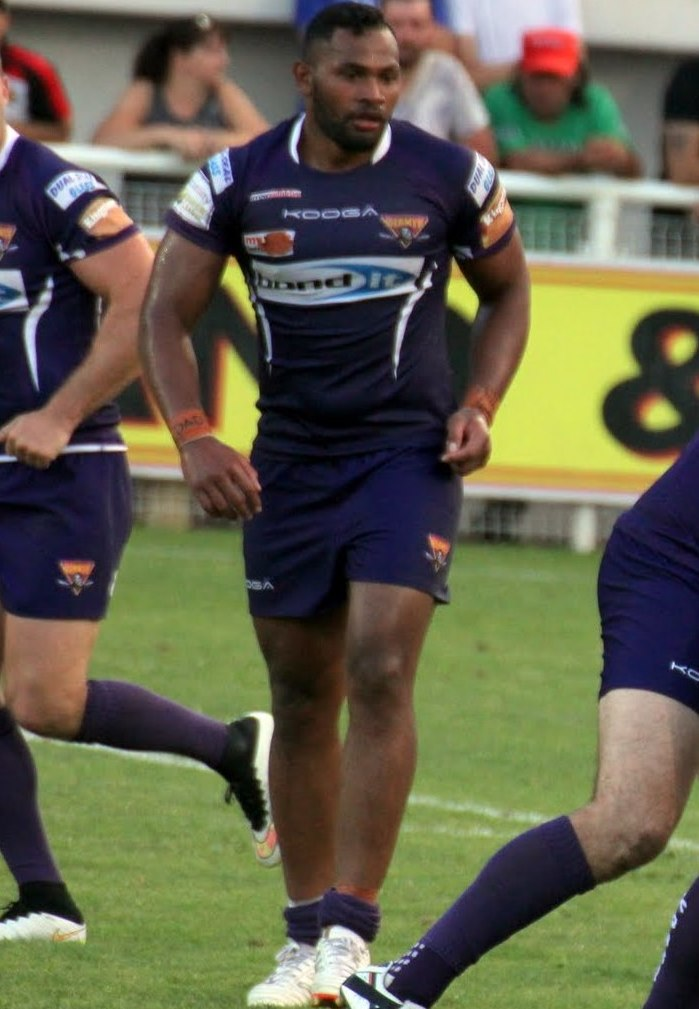

Personal information
- Full name: Ukuma Taʻai
- Born: 17 January 1987 (age 39) Nuku'alofa, Tonga

Playing information
- Height: 6 ft 1 in (1.85 m)
- Weight: 16 st 7 lb (105 kg)
- Position: Second-row, Loose forward, Prop
Club
Years	Team	Pld	T	G	FG	P
2009–12	New Zealand Warriors	52	7	0	0	28
2013–20	Huddersfield Giants	196	47	0	0	188
2021–22	Newcastle Thunder	34	13	0	0	52
2023–26	York Knights	57	7	0	0	28
2026	→ Newcastle Thunder (DR)	3	1	0	0	4
	Total	342	75	0	0	300
Representative
Years	Team	Pld	T	G	FG	P
2006–17	Tonga	10	2	0	0	8

Ukuma Ta'ai (born 17 January 1987) is a Tongan former professional rugby league footballer who last played as a second-row, loose forward or prop for Newcastle Thunder in the RFL Championship on DR loan in a player-coach role from the York Knights in the Super league, and Tonga at international level.

He previously played for the New Zealand Warriors in the NRL and the Huddersfield Giants in the Super League.

== Background ==
Ta'ai was born in Nuku'alofa, Tonga.

== Early years ==
Ta'ai was educated at Tonga College and originally played rugby union. When he moved to Auckland, New Zealand, Ta'ai played for the University club and made the Auckland Rugby Union second XV. The following year, at the suggestion of a friend, he switched codes and joined the Mt Albert Rugby League Club and played in the Auckland Rugby League competition. In 2008 he played for the Auckland Vulcans in the NSW Cup.

== Club career ==
=== New Zealand Warriors ===
Ta'ai was signed by the New Zealand Warriors in 2009 and made his début in a trial game against the North Queensland Cowboys. He made his first grade début in Round Two 2009 against the Manly-Warringah Sea Eagles. Ta'ai scored the Warriors first try against Penrith on 17 April after pouncing on a loose pass and crossing under the posts. He re-signed with the Warriors for the 2012 season but was told he would be released by the club at the end of the year.

=== Huddersfield Giants ===
On 12 September 2012 Ta'ai signed with Huddersfield until 2015. His transfer was held up by red tape, until in January 2013 he was granted a British work permit. He scored his first try against Hull F.C. on 7 July 2013.

=== Newcastle Thunder ===
On 5 February 2021, it was reported that he had signed for the Newcastle Thunder in the RFL Championship.

=== York Knights ===
On 28 September 2022, it was reported that he had signed for York in the RFL Championship. On 7 June 2025, he played in York's 1895 Cup final victory over Featherstone.

=== Newcastle Thunder (DR) ===
On 14 January 2026 it was reported that he had signed for Newcastle Thunder in the RFL Championship on DR loan in a player-coach role

== Representative career ==
In 2006 Ta'ai played for Tonga in the Pacific Cup, picked from Tonga College's Under 19 rugby union team at the age of 19. The Tongan team won the tournament. He played for Tonga in the 2009 Pacific Cup. At the conclusion of the 2015 season, Ta'ai played for Tonga in their Asia-Pacific Qualifier match against the Cook Islands for the 2017 Rugby League World Cup.
