= Richard Faʻaoso =

Tonga international rugby league footballer

Richie Faʻaoso
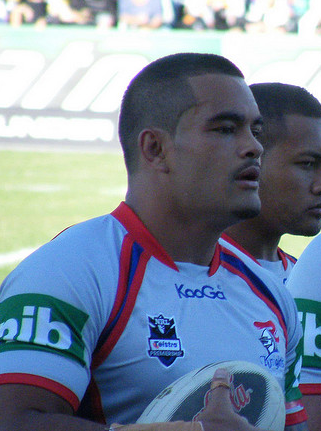
- Fa'aoso playing for the Newcastle Knights in 2009.

Personal information
- Full name: Lisiate Siaosi Fa'aoso
- Born: 8 May 1984 (age 42) Cairns, Queensland, Australia
- Height: 180 cm (5 ft 11 in)
- Weight: 100 kg (15 st 10 lb)

Playing information
- Position: Prop, Second-row
Club
Years	Team	Pld	T	G	FG	P
2004	Penrith Panthers	10	2	0	0	8
2005	Sydney Roosters	21	1	0	0	4
2006	Castleford Tigers	26	5	0	0	20
2007	Parramatta Eels	1	0	0	0	0
2008–12	Newcastle Knights	99	12	0	0	48
2012	Melbourne Storm	6	0	0	0	0
2013	Manly Sea Eagles	18	0	0	0	0
2015	Parramatta Eels	5	0	0	0	0
	Total	186	20	0	0	80
Representative
Years	Team	Pld	T	G	FG	P
2006–15	Tonga	10	4	0	0	8
- Source: As of 26 April 2015

Richard Fa'aoso (born 8 May 1984), also known by the nicknames of "Richie", and "Fuss", is a former Tonga international rugby league footballer. He played as a prop and played for the Penrith Panthers, Sydney Roosters, Parramatta Eels, Newcastle Knights, Melbourne Storm and the Manly Warringah Sea Eagles in the National Rugby League, and the Castleford Tigers in the Super League.

== Background ==
Fa'aoso is of Australian, Tongan and Samoan descent. His father Tongan and Samoan, while his mother is Australian of European descent.

He was educated at Wavell State High School. Fa'aoso played his junior football for Norths Aspley before being signed by the Penrith Panthers.

== Playing career ==
=== Penrith Panthers ===
In round 14 of the 2004 NRL season, Fa'aoso made his NRL début for Penrith against the St. George Illawarra Dragons. Fa'aoso played for Penrith in their preliminary final defeat against Canterbury.

=== Sydney Roosters ===
In 2005, he joined the Sydney Roosters and played 21 games for them during the year.

=== Castleford Tigers ===
In 2006, Fa'aoso played for the Castleford Tigers in the Super League, who signed him after their promotion in 2005.

=== Parramatta Eels ===
In 2007, he returned to Australia, signing with the Parramatta Eels for three years. He was touted as a replacement for departing Parramatta player Michael Vella who left the Eels to join Super League club Hull Kingston Rovers in 2007. Faʻaoso only played one first grade game for the club which was Parramatta's round 4 victory over Canberra.

=== Newcastle Knights ===
After 2007, Fa'aoso was released to sign a two-year deal with the recently cleaned out, Brian Smith-coached Newcastle Knights. During 2008, Fa'aoso became a permanent first-grader for Newcastle, earning a new three-year contract for the Newcastle club after making 45 appearances and scoring seven tries for the club. Fa'aoso made another 46 appearances, scoring three tries during 2010 and 2011, making the Newcastle side the club that he spent the most time with.

In 2012 Wayne Bennett took over as coach of the Newcastle outfit and at the halfway stage of the season Fa'aoso had only made eight appearances for the team. He was told that he wouldn't be re-signed for 2013 after 99 games and wouldn't be stopped if he were to find a new club to join mid-season before 30 June transfer deadline.

=== Melbourne Storm ===
On 27 June 2012, Fa'aoso traveled to Melbourne to have a fitness test in order to sign with the Melbourne Storm for the remainder of the 2012 season. He officially signed with the Storm later that afternoon. The Storm's general manager of Football Operations, Frank Ponissi, said the signing of Fa'aoso was a welcome addition to their NRL squad : "We see Richie's signing as a chance to bring some further experience and strength to our roster." Fa'aoso left the Knights as a fan favourite, playing 99 games and scoring 12 tries. Fa'aoso said about the move “I have had a ball at the Knights and I will always have great mates here, I thank the Knights for the opportunity and to everyone for their efforts; the coaches, my teammates, the trainers, just everyone at the Club for all they have done for me. Wayne (Bennett) was great to give me a chance at the start of the season and I am disappointed I was unable to make the most of it. I also want to say thank you to all of the Knights fans for your support. The time is right for me to move on and I wish the Knights all the best for the rest of the season and beyond.”

On 30 September 2012, Fa'aoso came off the bench in the Melbourne Storm's 2012 NRL Grand Final win over the Canterbury-Bankstown Bulldogs. He played a total of six games for the club.

=== Manly Warringah Sea Eagles ===
On 10 July 2012, just 13 days after signing with Melbourne, Fa'aoso signed a two-year deal with the Manly Warringah Sea Eagles starting in 2013, despite not yet having played a game for the Melbourne Storm.

Towards the end of the 2013 NRL season, Fa'aoso broke his neck. In February 2014, doctors advised him never to play Rugby league again. He subsequently announced his retirement from Rugby league.

=== Parramatta Eels second stint ===
In September 2014, Fa'aoso was cleared for a shock comeback to the NRL from his broken neck. On 30 October 2014, he signed a one-year contract with the Parramatta Eels starting in 2015. However the NRL did not register the contract, after Fa'aoso could not secure adequate insurance cover for his return.

On 2 April 2015, Fa'aoso was cleared to return to the playing field. He made his return in round 7 of the 2015 NRL season against his former team Newcastle. Shortly after getting on the field, Fa'aoso suffered a concussion from a head knock and was taken off, he subsequently failed the concussion test and was ruled out for the remainder of the match. In October 2015, Fa'aoso again announced his retirement.

== Representative career ==
Fa'aoso made his international début for Tonga in 2006, playing 4 tests.

In August 2008, Fa'aoso was named in the Tonga training squad for the 2008 World Cup, and in October 2008 he was named in the final 24-man Tonga squad.

Fa'aoso was again selected for the Tongan national team in 2009 for the Pacific Cup. He was named Tongan player of the year for 2009.

On 20 April 2013, Fa'aoso played for Tonga in their Pacific Rugby League International match with Samoa.

On 2 May 2015, Fa'aoso made his 10th appearance for Tonga in his country's clash against Pacific rivals Samoa in the 2015 Polynesian Cup.

== Achievements and accolades ==
=== Team ===
- 2012 NRL Grand Final: Melbourne Storm – Winners
