= Josh Ganson =

English rugby league footballer (born 1998)

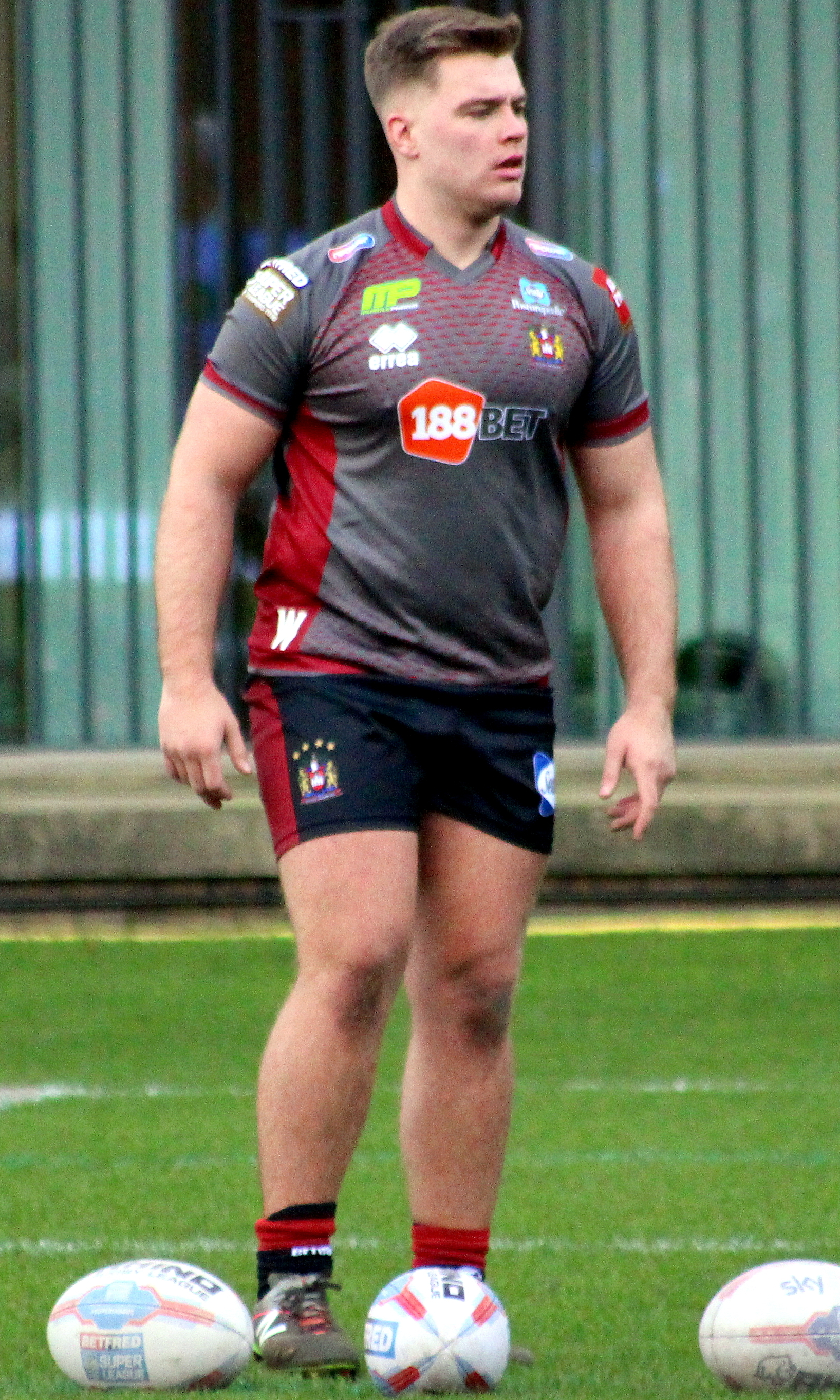

Personal information
- Full name: Joshua Ganson
- Born: 19 February 1998 (age 28) Billinge Higher End, Wigan, England
- Height: 5 ft 9 in (1.76 m)
- Weight: 15 st 8 lb (99 kg)

Playing information
- Position: Hooker
Club
Years	Team	Pld	T	G	FG	P
2017–19	Wigan Warriors	9	3	0	0	12
2018(loan)	→ London Skolars	1	0	0	0	0
2018(loan)	→ Swinton Lions	14	1	0	0	4
2019(loan)	→ Swinton Lions	3	0	0	0	0
2019–	Widnes Vikings	14	1	0	0	4
	Total	41	5	0	0	20
- Source: As of 10 July 2019

Joshua Ganson (born 19 February 1998) is an English professional rugby league footballer who plays as a hooker for the Widnes Vikings in the Championship.

He previously played for the Wigan Warriors in the Super League.

== Background ==
Ganson was born in Billinge Higher End, Wigan, England.

His father, Steve Ganson, is a former Super League referee and current Head of Match Officials at the Rugby Football League.

== Career ==
In 2017, Ganson made his Wigan Super League début against the Castleford Tigers.
