= Daniel Fepuleai =

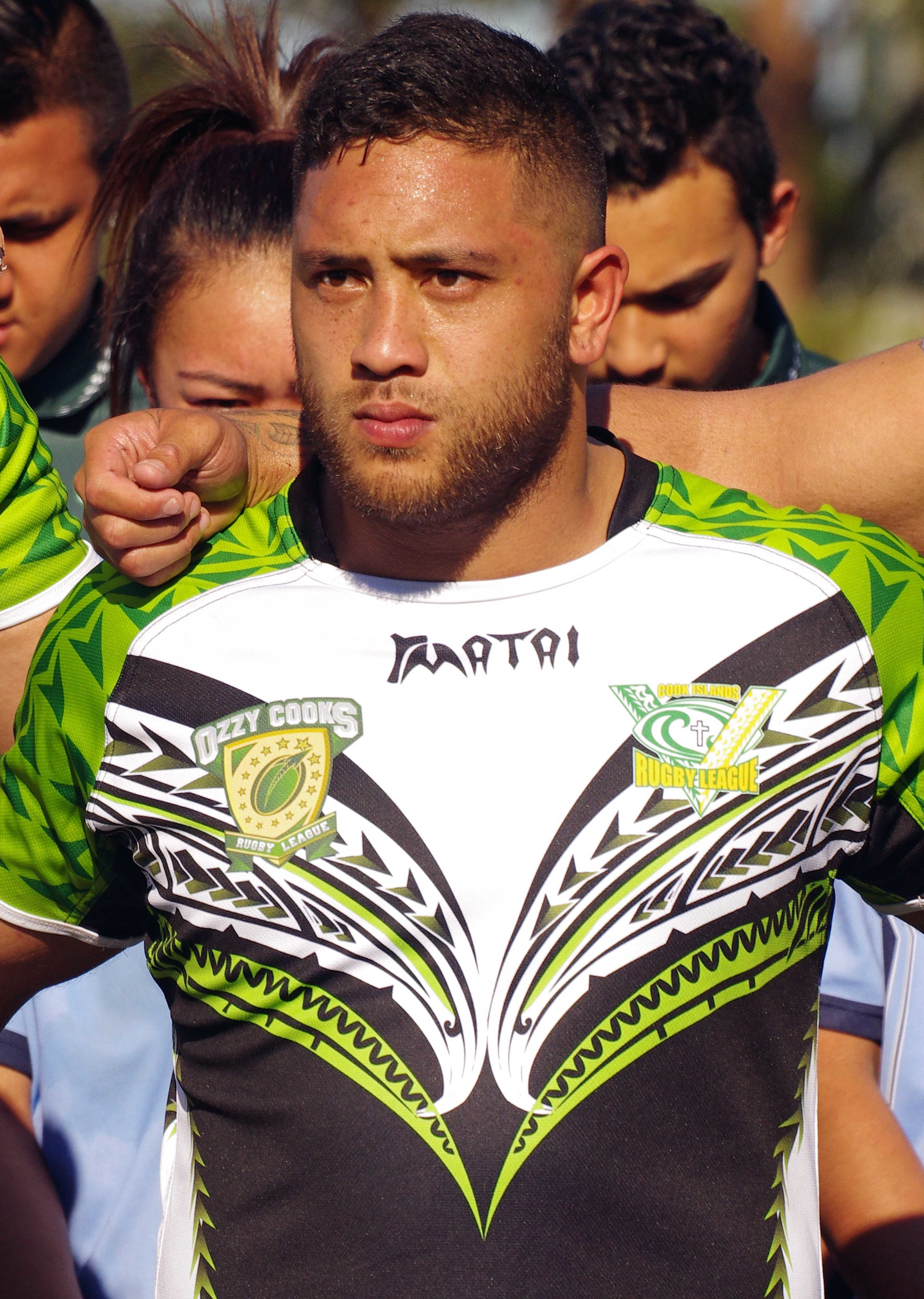

Personal information
- Born: 25 November 1988 (age 37) Sydney, Australia
- Height: 175 cm (5 ft 9 in)
- Weight: 95 kg (14 st 13 lb)

Playing information
- Position: Hooker
Club
Years	Team	Pld	T	G	FG	P
2010	Sydney Roosters	1	0	0	0	0
Representative
Years	Team	Pld	T	G	FG	P
2009–13	Cook Islands	6	4	2	0	20

Daniel Fepuleai (born 25 November 1988) is a Cook Islands professional rugby league footballer for the North Sydney Bears in the NSW Cup. He previously played with Sydney Roosters in Australasia's National Rugby League, and the St. George Illawarra Dragons as well as a stint with the New Jersey Turnpike Titans in the USA Rugby League. He plays primarily as a hooker. Despite never featuring for the Dragons' first grade team, Fepuleai reached the final of the 2009 Pacific Cup with the Cook Islands. He made his NRL debut for Sydney Roosters against the Penrith Panthers in round 5 of the competition in 2010.

== Background ==
Fepuleai is of Cook Island heritage and played for Hurstville United as a junior. He won the Arrive Alive Cup for his school Endeavour Sports High School in 2006. He is the cousin of new Dragons youth signing Hayden Fepuleai, who joined the Dragons from Hurstville as well.

== Playing career ==
Fepuleai signed for the Dragons as an 18-year-old in 2006 but could not force his way into first-grade reckoning. He played for the S. G. Ball Cup team and later the National Youth Competition (under 20's) team as he could not gain first team football. In 2009, however, after playing for the Dragon's feeder team, Shellharbour Dragons, he was selected to play for the Cook Islands in the 2009 Pacific Cup. Fepuleai signed with the Sydney Roosters for the 2010 season and made his first-grade début in football in round five of this particular season, coming off the interchange bench in a 28–6 loss to the Penrith Panthers.

== Representative career ==
During the Pacific Cup, he played in the victory over Samoa, in which he scored in a 22–20 win that qualified the Cooks for the tournament proper. He then scored twice and kicked two goals in a 24–22 win over Fiji in a man-of-the-match performance. His side were defeated in the final, 44–14 by Papua New Guinea. Additionally, he finished as top points scorer in the tournament with 16 points.

Fepuleai played for 'the Kukis' at the 2013 Rugby League World Cup. He was an influential player throughout the campaign, and he scored a try in their last game against Wales
