= Tere Glassie =

Former Cook Islands international rugby league footballer

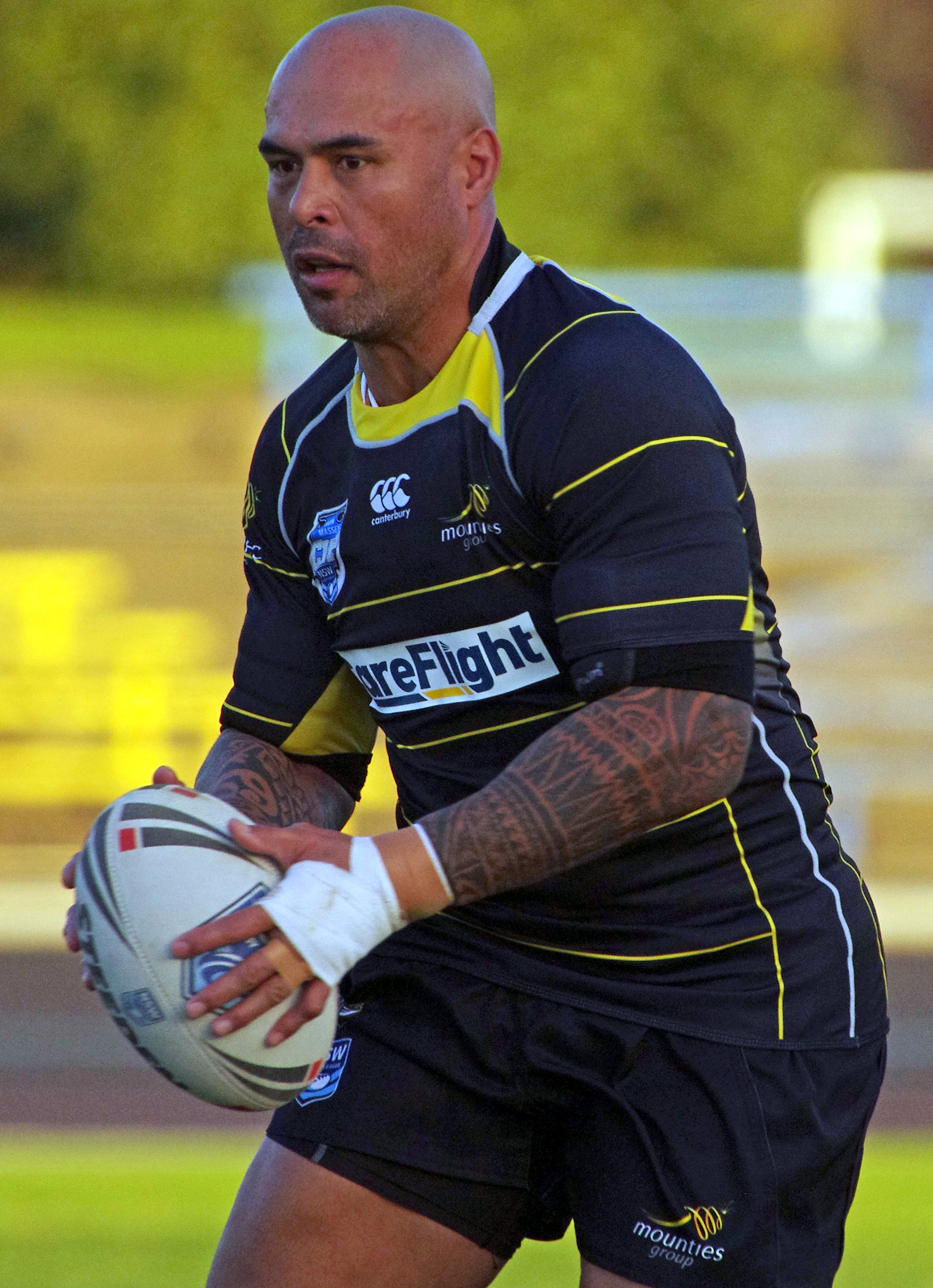

Personal information
- Full name: Tere Glassie
- Born: 1 December 1977 (age 48) Auckland, New Zealand

Playing information
- Position: Prop, Second-row, Lock
Club
Years	Team	Pld	T	G	FG	P
1997	South Sydney	3	0	0	0	0
2005	Oldham	23	6	0	0	24
2006	Leigh Centurions	20	4	0	0	16
2007	Castleford Tigers	19	3	0	0	12
2008	Dewsbury Rams	26	1	0	0	4
	Total	91	14	0	0	56
Representative
Years	Team	Pld	T	G	FG	P
1998–2016	Cook Islands	11	2	0	0	8
- Source: As of 20 April 2017

Tere Glassie (born 1 December 1977) is a former professional rugby league footballer who played as a prop, second-row or loose forward in the 1990s, 2000s and 2010s.

He played at representative level for the Cook Islands, and at club level for the South Sydney Rabbitohs, Balmain Tigers (non-first grade), Newtown Jets (three spells), Wests Magpies (non-first grade), Oldham R.L.F.C., Leigh Centurions, Castleford Tigers, Dewsbury Rams and Mounties (captain)

== Playing career ==
Glassie learned his trade with South Sydney, playing 3 first grade games with the Rabbitohs before further lower grade stints with Balmain Tigers, Newtown Jets (two spells) and Wests Magpies. He then moved to the United Kingdom and played for Oldham, Leigh, Castleford Tigers and the Dewsbury Rams. He then returned to Australia and played for the Newtown Jets. Glassie then played in the 2017 Cook Islands grand final with the Avatiu Eels at age 39.

== Representative career ==
Tere represented the Cook Islands in the 2000 World Cup.

In 2009 he was named as part of the Cook Islands squad for the Pacific Cup.
