= Anton Kui =

PNG international rugby league footballer

Personal information
- Full name: Anton Kui
- Born: Papua New Guinea

Playing information
- Position: Centre
Representative
Years	Team	Pld	T	G	FG	P
2008–09	Papua New Guinea	3	2	0	0	8
2009	PNG Prime Minister's XIII	1	0	0	0	0
- As of 9 November 2023

Anton Kui is a professional rugby league footballer who plays for the Bingtangor Lahanis in Papua New Guinea. He is a Papua New Guinea international.

== Career ==
Kui was named in the Papua New Guinea training squad, and later in the main squad for the 2008 Rugby League World Cup. He was named as part of the Papua New Guinea squad for the 2009 Pacific Cup.
