= Misi Taulapapa =

Samoa international rugby league footballer

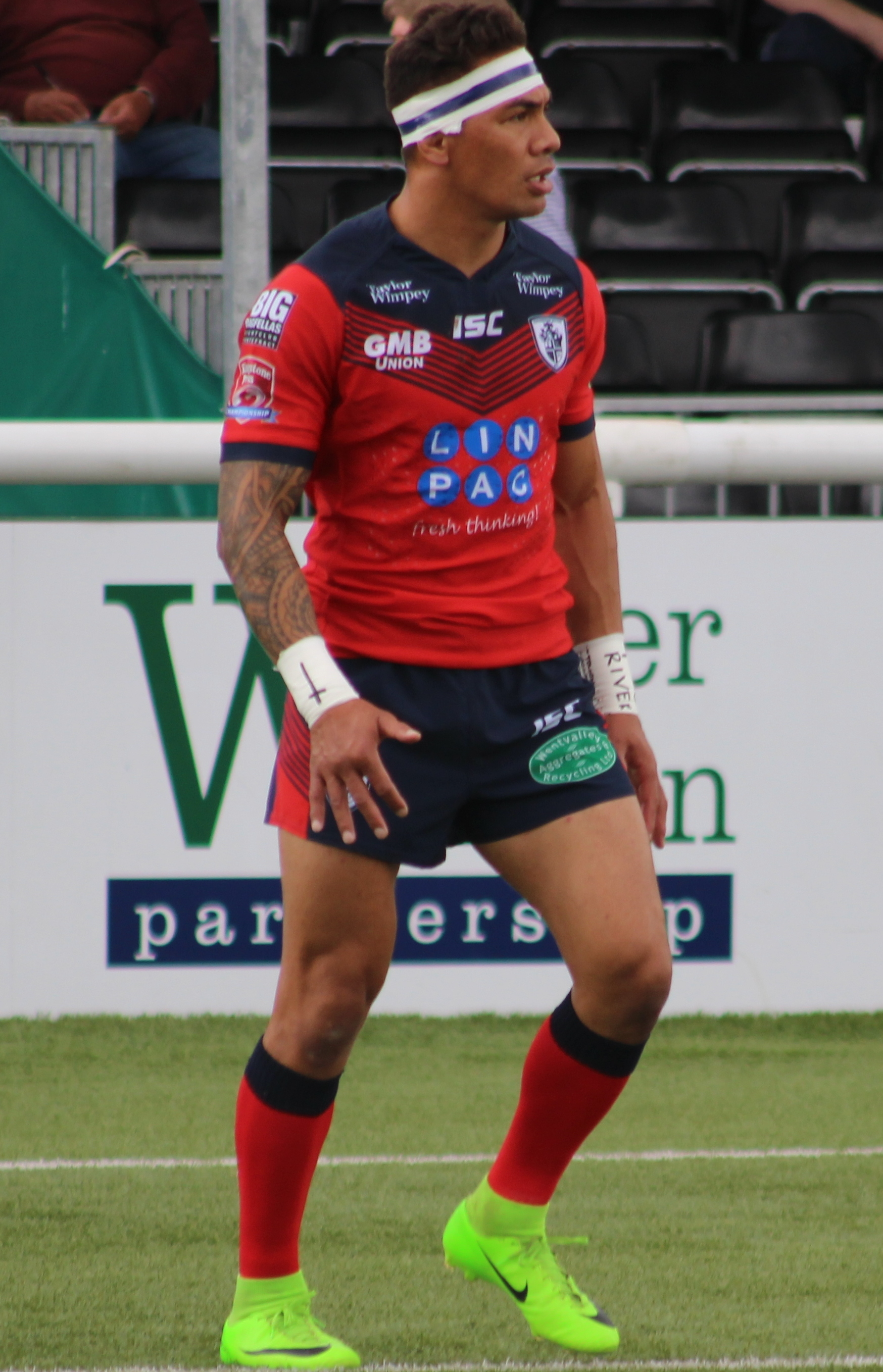

Personal information
- Full name: Misi Taulapapa
- Born: 25 January 1982 (age 44) Auckland, New Zealand
- Height: 5 ft 10 in (1.77 m)
- Weight: 13 st 5 lb (85 kg)

Playing information

Rugby league
- Position: Fullback, Wing, Centre
Club
Years	Team	Pld	T	G	FG	P
2006	New Zealand Warriors	5	0	0	0	0
2007–09	Cronulla Sharks	33	7	0	0	28
2010–15	Sheffield Eagles	168	70	0	0	280
2016–18	Featherstone Rovers	80	32	0	0	128
2019–20	Newcastle Thunder	24	13	0	0	52
2021–24	Doncaster	50	14	1	0	58
2024(loan)	→ Rochdale Hornets	9	4	0	0	16
2025	Goole Vikings	14	0	0	0	0
	Total	383	140	1	0	562
Representative
Years	Team	Pld	T	G	FG	P
2008–09	Samoa	3	3	0	0	12

Rugby union
Club
Years	Team	Pld	T	G	FG	P
2003–04	Waitemata RFC	4	1	0	0	5
- Source: As of 16 November 2024

Misi Taulapapa (born 25 January 1982) is a former Samoa international rugby league footballer who last played as a centre or winger for Goole Vikings in the RFL League 1.

He has previously played for the New Zealand Warriors and the Cronulla-Sutherland Sharks in the NRL, and the Sheffield Eagles, Featherstone Rovers and Doncaster in the Championship. Taulapapa has also played for the Rochdale Hornets and Newcastle Thunder in League 1.

== Early years ==
Taulapapa was born Auckland, New Zealand.

He originally played rugby union for the Waitemata Football club, in the Auckland Rugby Union competition. He played with Waitemata when they won the Gallagher Shield in 2003. Taulapapa also represented the Kelston Boys High School's First XV in both regional and national tournaments.

== Playing career ==
Taulapapa switched to rugby league in 2004. Taulapapa was selected to play in the Bartercard Cup competition for the Marist Richmond Brothers from where he was picked up by the New Zealand Warriors.

Taulapapa played in six matches for the New Zealand Warriors in 2006 before he was released mid-season for turning up to a training session intoxicated.

After being released by the Warriors halfway through the 2006 season he moved to Queensland to finish the season at the Central Comets.

=== Cronulla-Sutherland Sharks ===
Taulapapa signed with the Cronulla-Sutherland Sharks in 2007. Here he played as a solid winger and was a fringe NRL player. Taulapapa made 19 appearances for the club in 2008 as Cronulla finished third on the table.

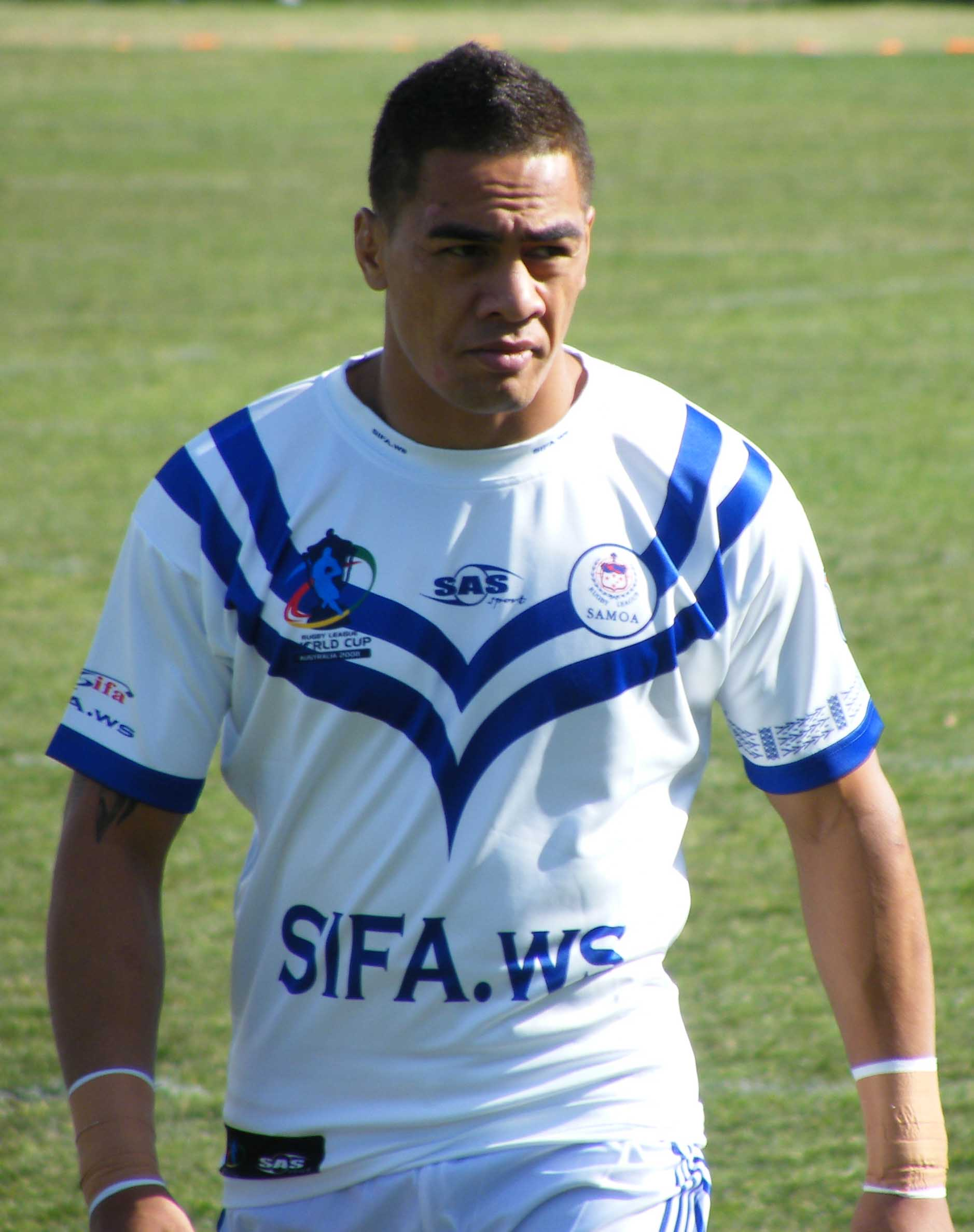
Taulapapa playing for Samoa in 2008

Taulapapa scored a hat-trick in the 2008 qualifying finals game against the Canberra Raiders. two weeks later, Taulapapa played on the wing for Cronulla in their 28-0 preliminary final defeat by Melbourne.

=== Gateshead Thunder ===
Taulapapa originally signed with the Gateshead Thunder for the 2010 season. However the club had financial difficulties which voided Taulapapa's contract.

=== Sheffield Eagles ===
He eventually signed with the Sheffield Eagles. After starting on the wing, he moved to full back after a long term injury ruled out the player in that position. He also took on the captaincy and by the end of the season was one of the stand out players for the Eagles, scoring a hat trick in a victory over the Leigh Centurions. two weeks later, against the same opponents in the play-offs, he suffered a broken leg that ruled him out for the remainder of the 2010 season.

=== Hull Kingston Rovers ===
In August 2011 Taulapapa signed to Super League club Hull Kingston Rovers. However, after his signature had been announced, Hull KR appointed a new manager - Craig Sandercock - who subsequently decided that Taulapapa did not fit into his plans for the 2012 season.

=== Sheffield Eagles (rejoin) ===
Taulapapa was released from his contract with Hull KR, without having played a single game, and re-signed for Sheffield, and later signed for Featherstone Rovers (captain). He would move to play for the Newcastle Thunder for the 2019 season.

=== Doncaster RLFC ===
On 9 Nov 2020 it was announced that he had signed for Doncaster for 2021.

=== Goole Vikings ===
On 15 Nov 2024 it was reported that he had signed for Goole Vikings in the RFL League 1

== Representative career ==
Taulapapa was a part of the Samoa squad for the 2008 Rugby League World Cup.

In 2009 he was named as part of the Samoa squad for the Pacific Cup.

== Coaching career ==
On 24 October 2025, it was announced he had joined Doncaster as Assistant Coach and Cultural Lead.
