= Fred Makimare =

Australian rugby league player (born 1989)

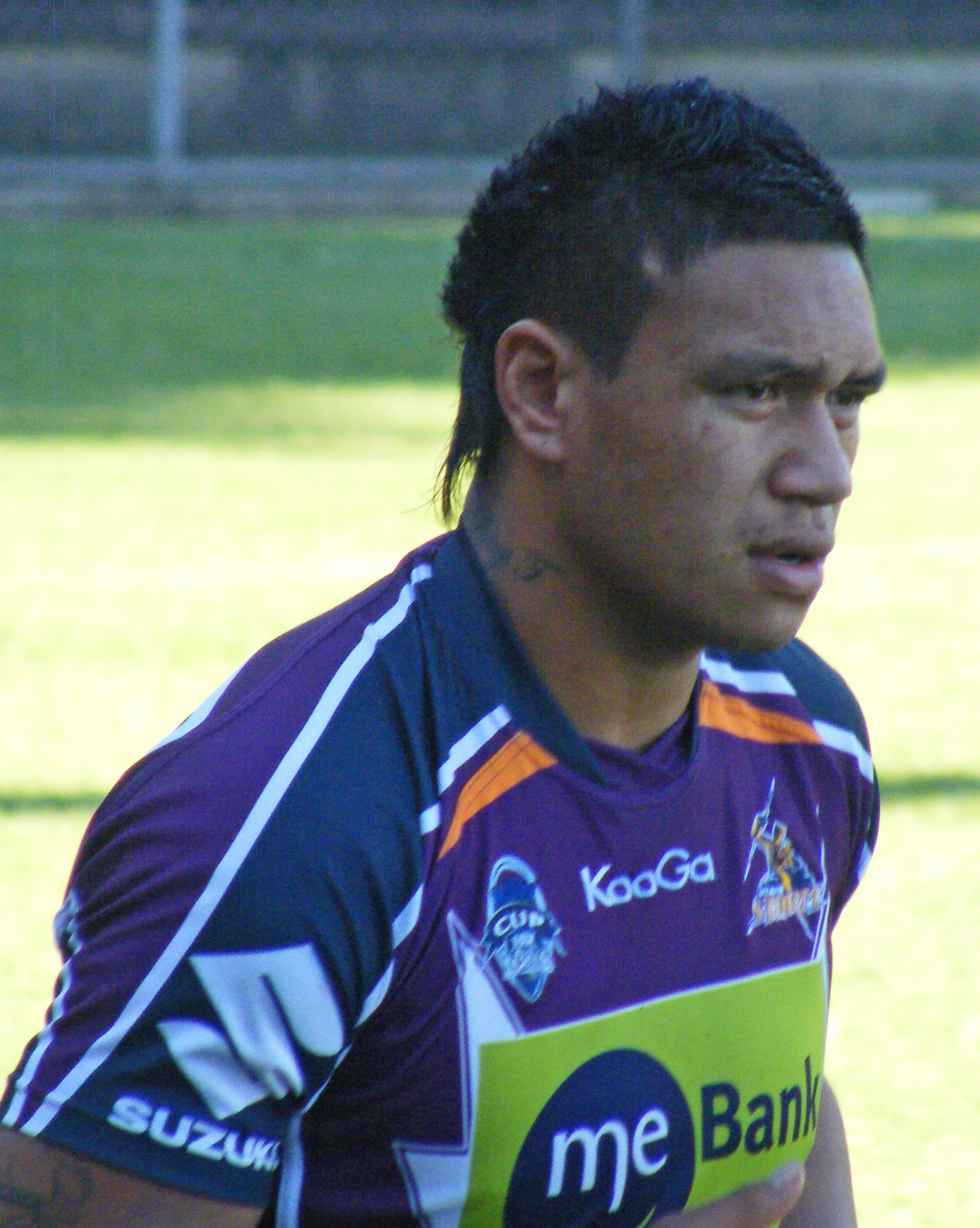

Personal information
- Born: 17 June 1989 (age 36) Australia
- Height: 182 cm (6 ft 0 in)
- Weight: 108 kg (17 st 0 lb)

Playing information
- Position: Prop
Representative
Years	Team	Pld	T	G	FG	P
2009–2010	Cook Islands	1	2	0	0	8

Fred Makimare (born 17 June 1989) is an Australian rugby league player who has represented the Cook Islands. He played in Melbourne Storms Under 20s grand final win over the Wests Tigers in 2009.

== Background ==
Fred Makimare was born in Australia, he has Cook Islanders ancestors.

== Representative career ==
In October 2009, Fred Makimare made his international debut for the Cook Islands scoring 2 tries in their 22–20 Pacific Cup qualifying match defeat of Samoa.
