= Chris James (referee) =

Australian former rugby league referee

Refereeing information
| Years | Competition | Apps |
| 2009–17 | National Rugby League | 228 |
| 2009 | Pacific Cup | 2 |
| 2013 | City vs Country Origin | 1 |

Chris James is an Australian former rugby league referee who controlled 228 first-grade games. He is now General Manager of Football Operations at the Newcastle Knights.

== Career ==
James started his career controlling matches in the Group Six Rugby League competition. He was graded into the NSWRLRA in 2004, becoming referee number 900. In 2009 he made his National Rugby League debut, controlling a match between the Gold Coast Titans and the Newcastle Knights. That year, he also controlled the Jim Beam Cup grand final and matches at the Pacific Cup.

He became a regular first grade referee and controlled the 2013 City vs Country Origin match. His 100th NRL game was on 5 April 2014, between the Penrith Panthers and the Canberra Raiders. In 2016, Tyson Frizell was suspended for a match for making contact with James, during a match between the St George Illawarra Dragons and the Canterbury-Bankstown Bulldogs.

He was sacked by the National Rugby League in 2017 after a total of 228 games and took legal action, backed by the Professional Rugby League Match Officials and Unions NSW. The parties reached a confidential settlement in 2018.

James was appointed Football Operations Manager of the Sydney Roosters in 2020 and in 2025 moved to the Newcastle Knights as General Manager of Football Operations
