= Ngaro =

Delicacy of the dead in a Māori legend

Ngaro ("vanished") is mentioned as a delicacy of the dead in a Māori legend from the far north of the North Island of New Zealand.

Te Atarahi was five days and five nights in Te Reinga, the place from where the spirits of the dead leap into the underworld. His seemingly dead body was found by two women who went out to cut flax leaves. When Te Atarahi revived, he mentioned being offered food by the inhabitants of Te Reinga, and also offered the information that ngaro was one of their delicacies. The story as reported by Edward Shortland has a degree of similarity to the New Testament episode where Jesus rose after three days and three nights in the tomb; Christian influence may have played a role in the plot of this tale.
