= Sione Tongia =

Tonga international rugby league footballer

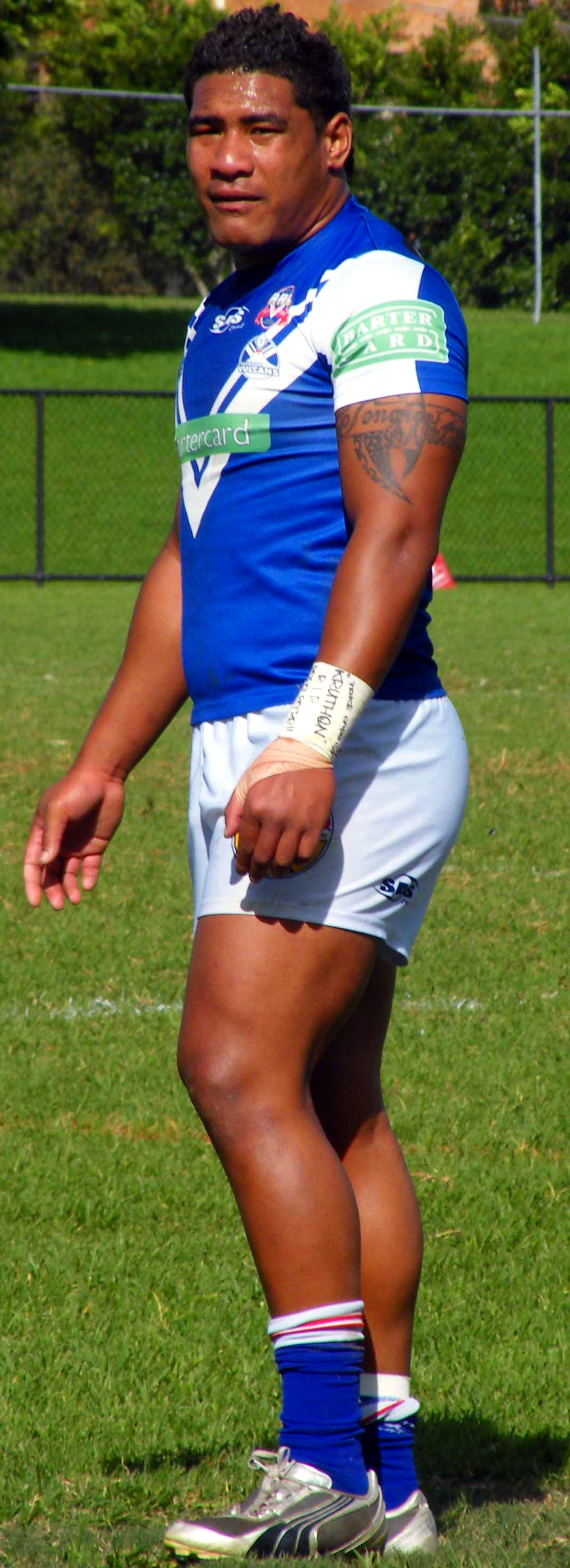

Personal information
- Born: 1987 or 1988 (age 38–39) Tonga

Playing information
- Position: Centre
Representative
Years	Team	Pld	T	G	FG	P
2009	Tonga	2	2	0	0	8

Sione Tongia is a Tongan rugby league footballer who represented Tonga at the 2009 Pacific Cup.

== Playing career ==
In 2008 and 2009 Tongia played for the Otahuhu Leopards in the Auckland Rugby League competition and represented Auckland in the Bartercard Premiership. In the 2009 Pacific Cup, Tongia was selected to play for Tonga. He also represented the New Zealand Residents against a touring Samoan Residents side. The home side won 62-14 on 10 October 2009.

Tongia played for the Auckland Vulcans in the NSW Cup in 2009 and 2010.

Tongia played for Junee in Group Nine in 2010 and 2011. He again played for Tonga in 2010 and 2011.

In 2012 Tongia again played for the Auckland Vulcans in the NSW Cup. Tongia joined a Queensland Cup team, the Central Queensland Capras, midway through 2012 and played for them in the 2013 season, as well as the Gladstone Wallabys club side.
