= Inoke Tapa'atoutai =

Tonga international rugby league footballer

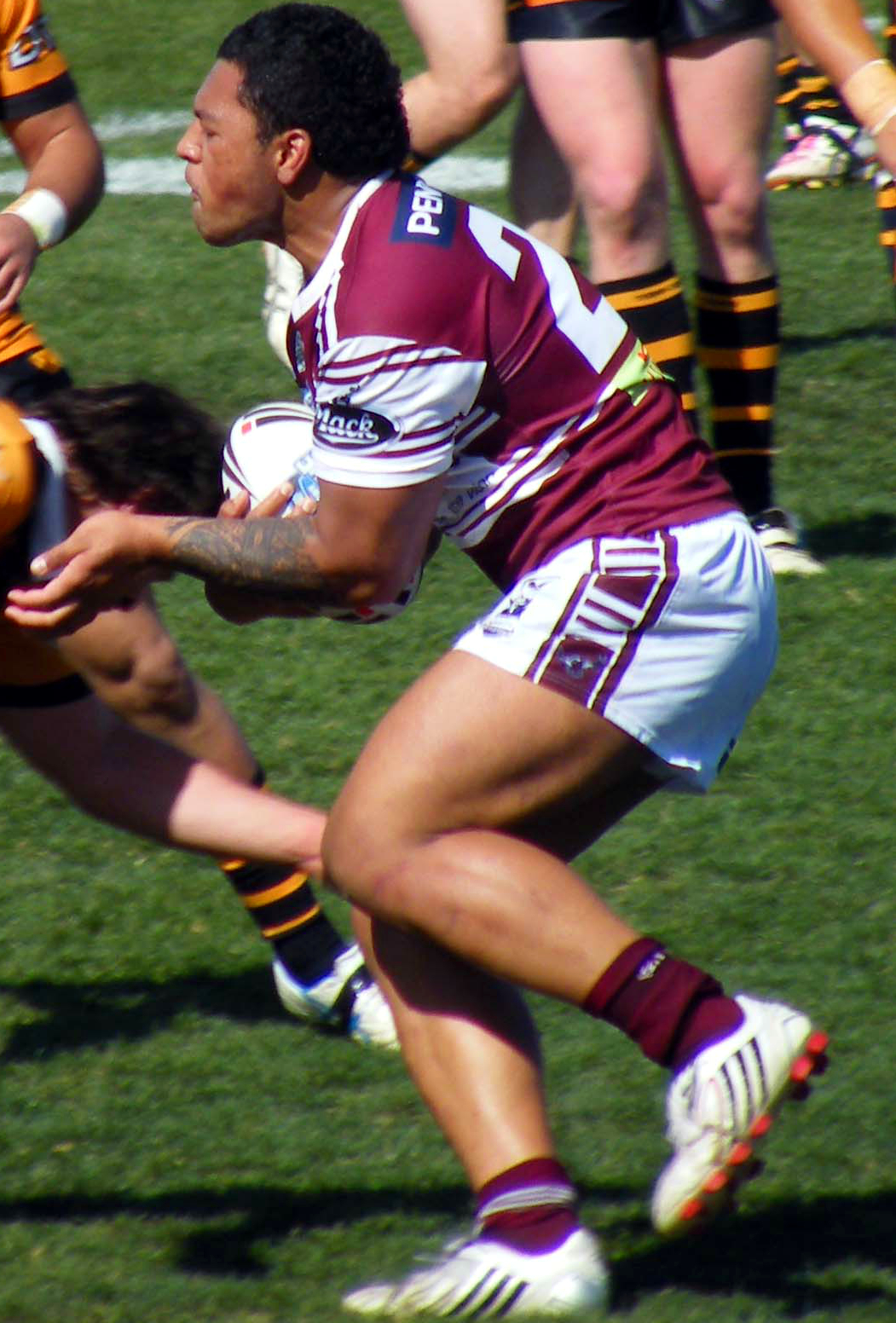

Personal information
- Full name: Inoke Tapa'atoutai
- Born: Manly, New South Wales, Australia
- Weight: 17 st 5 lb (110 kg)

Playing information
- Position: Prop
Club
Years	Team	Pld	T	G	FG	P
2008	Manly-Warringah Sea Eagles
2009–10	Cronulla-Sutherland Sharks
2011	Montpellier Red Devils
	Total	0	0	0	0	0
Representative
Years	Team	Pld	T	G	FG	P
2009	Tonga	1	0	0	0	0
- Source: As of 15 September 2016

Inoke Tapa'atoutai is a Tongan international rugby league footballer who most recently played as a prop for the Cronulla Sharks in the New South Wales Cup.
