= Hamilton Hughes =

Fijian rugby league player

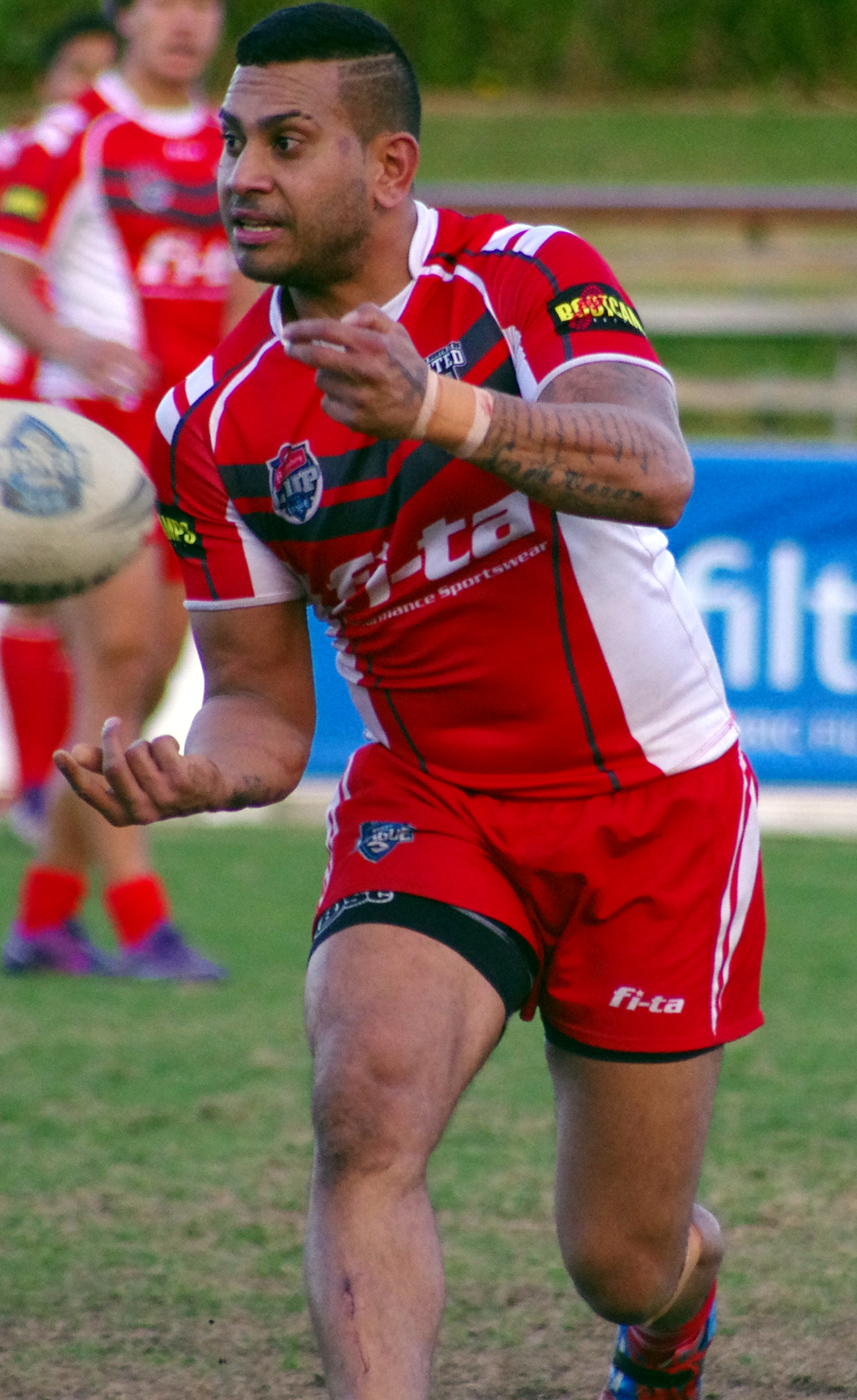

Personal information
- Full name: Hamilton Hughes

Playing information
Representative
Years	Team	Pld	T	G	FG	P
2006–09	Fiji	5	1	0	0	4
- Source: As of 14 September 2016

Hamilton Hughes is a Fijian professional rugby league player who most recently played for the Concord-Burwood Wolves in the Ron Massey Cup. Hughes is a Fijian international.
