= Vincent Ngaro =

Cook Island rugby league player

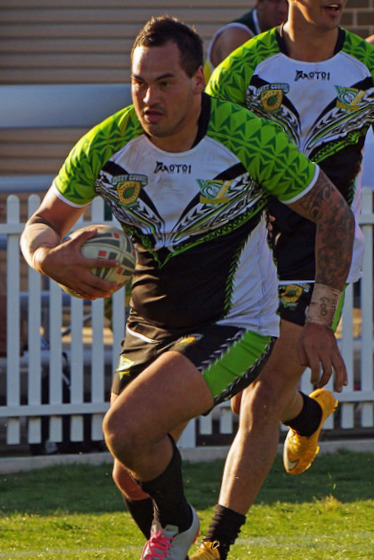
Ngaro representing the Cook Islands (2015)

Vincent Ngaro is a Cook Island professional rugby league footballer who played in the 2000s and 2010s who has represented the Cook Islands.

In 2009 Ngaro played in the 2009 Pacific Cup. He scored a try in the 22-20 qualifying round victory over Samoa. He also scored a try in the 24-22 semi-final victory over Fiji.

In 2011 Ngaro won the top flight (A1) Manly-Warringah District Junior Rugby League Grand Final for the Narraweena Hawks.

In 2014 he was player of the year in the Sydney Shield competition.
