= Pita Maile =

Tonga international rugby league footballer

Personal information
- Born: 30 May 1990 (age 36) Tonga

Playing information
- Position: Centre, Wing
Club
Years	Team	Pld	T	G	FG	P
2009–10	Melbourne Storm (U20)	29	12	0	0	48
Representative
Years	Team	Pld	T	G	FG	P
2009	Tonga	2	0	1	0	2
- Source: As of 12 April 2024

Pita Maile (born 30 May 1990) is a Tongan rugby league footballer who plays as a centre, or on the wing. He previously played for the Melbourne Storm in the NRL Under-20s and was a part of their 2009 Grand Final winning team. He is a Tongan international.

== Playing career ==
Maile originally played junior representative rugby league with the Parramatta Eels, playing in the S.G. Ball Cup with the Eels in 2008. Maile played two seasons with the Melbourne Storm NRL Under-20s team, scoring 12 tries in 29 appearances. Following the 2009 NRL Under-20s Grand Final, he was selected to play for Tonga in October 2009, playing two internationals.

Little is known about Maile's career following the completion of the 2010 NRL Under-20s season. He did play some matches in the NRL Victoria competition with the North-West Wolves.
