= Sam Huihahau =

Tonga international rugby league footballer

Sam Latu
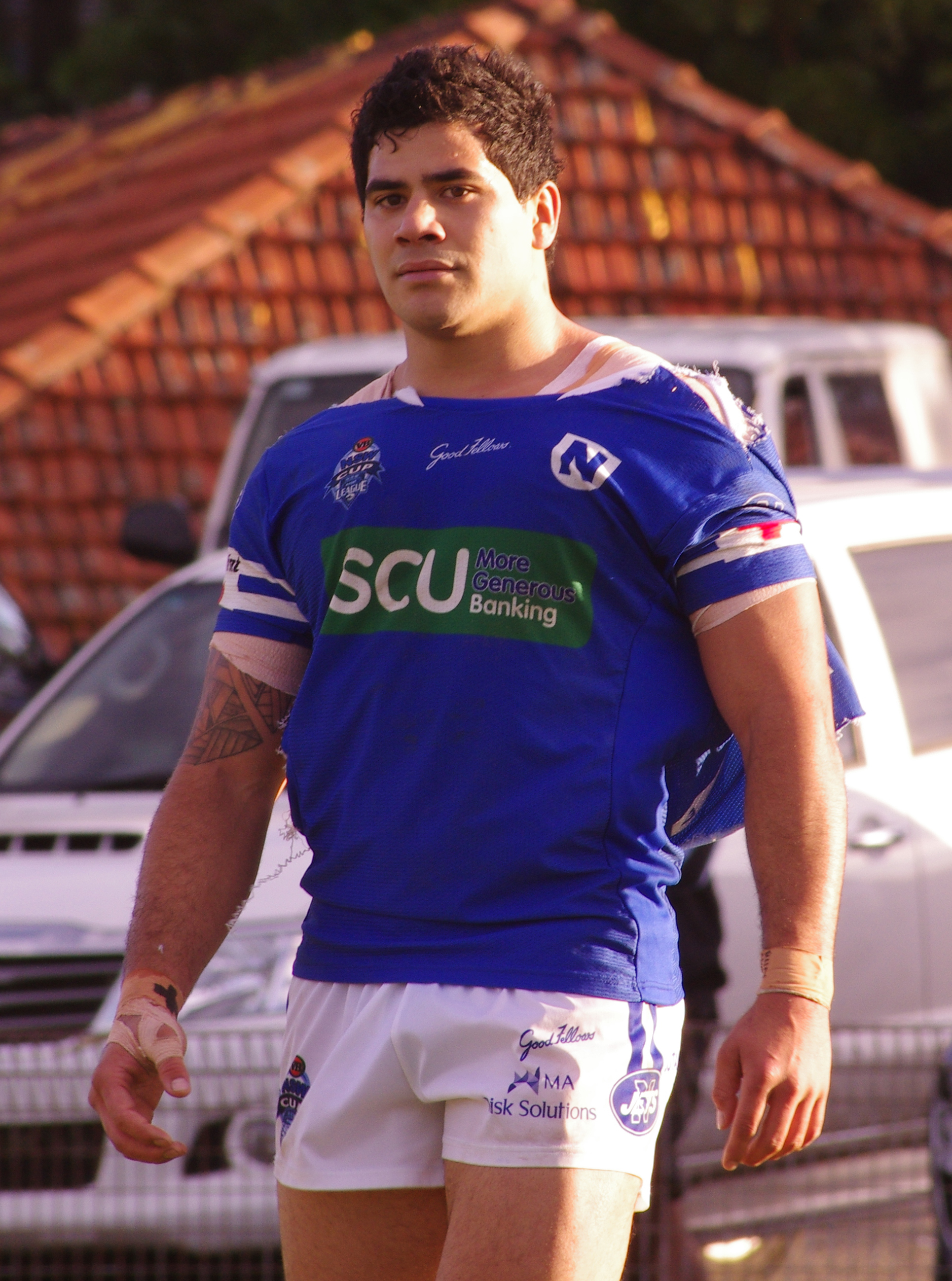

Personal information
- Full name: Sam Huihahau
- Born: 21 June 1988 (age 38) Sydney, New South Wales, Australia
- Height: 180 cm (5 ft 11 in)
- Weight: 89 kg (14 st 0 lb)

Playing information
- Position: Wing
Club
Years	Team	Pld	T	G	FG	P
2008	South Sydney	2	0	0	0	0
2010–11	Wests Tigers	2	0	0	0	0
	Total	4	0	0	0	0
Representative
Years	Team	Pld	T	G	FG	P
2009	Tonga	1	1	0	0	4
- Source: As of 29 June 2011

Sam Latu (born 21 June 1988) is an Australian former professional rugby league footballer who played in the 2000s and 2010s. He played at representative level for Tonga, and at club level for Mascot Jets and Balmain Ryde-Eastwood Tigers, in the National Rugby League (NRL) for the South Sydney Rabbitohs and the Wests Tigers, and Newtown Jets, as a wing.

== Background ==
He was born as Sam Huihahau in Sydney, New South Wales, Australia.

== Career ==
Latu played junior football with the Mascot Jets. His first-grade debut was for the South Sydney Rabbitohs against the Cronulla Sharks at ANZ Stadium in round 5 of the 2008 NRL season. He spent 2009 with the Canberra Raiders without making an appearance.

In 2010, Latu joined the Wests Tigers. He made his club debut near the end of the season, but injured his knee in the match, and failed to make another appearance that year. His next appearance was in round 6 of 2011, covering for injuries to Beau Ryan and Lote Tuqiri.

Midway through the 2011 season, Latu was released by the Wests Tigers to join Sydney Roosters feeder club, Newtown Jets

Latu was named in the Tonga training squad for the 2008 Rugby League World Cup.
