= Dominique Peyroux =

Cook Islands and Samoa international rugby league footballer

Dom Peyroux
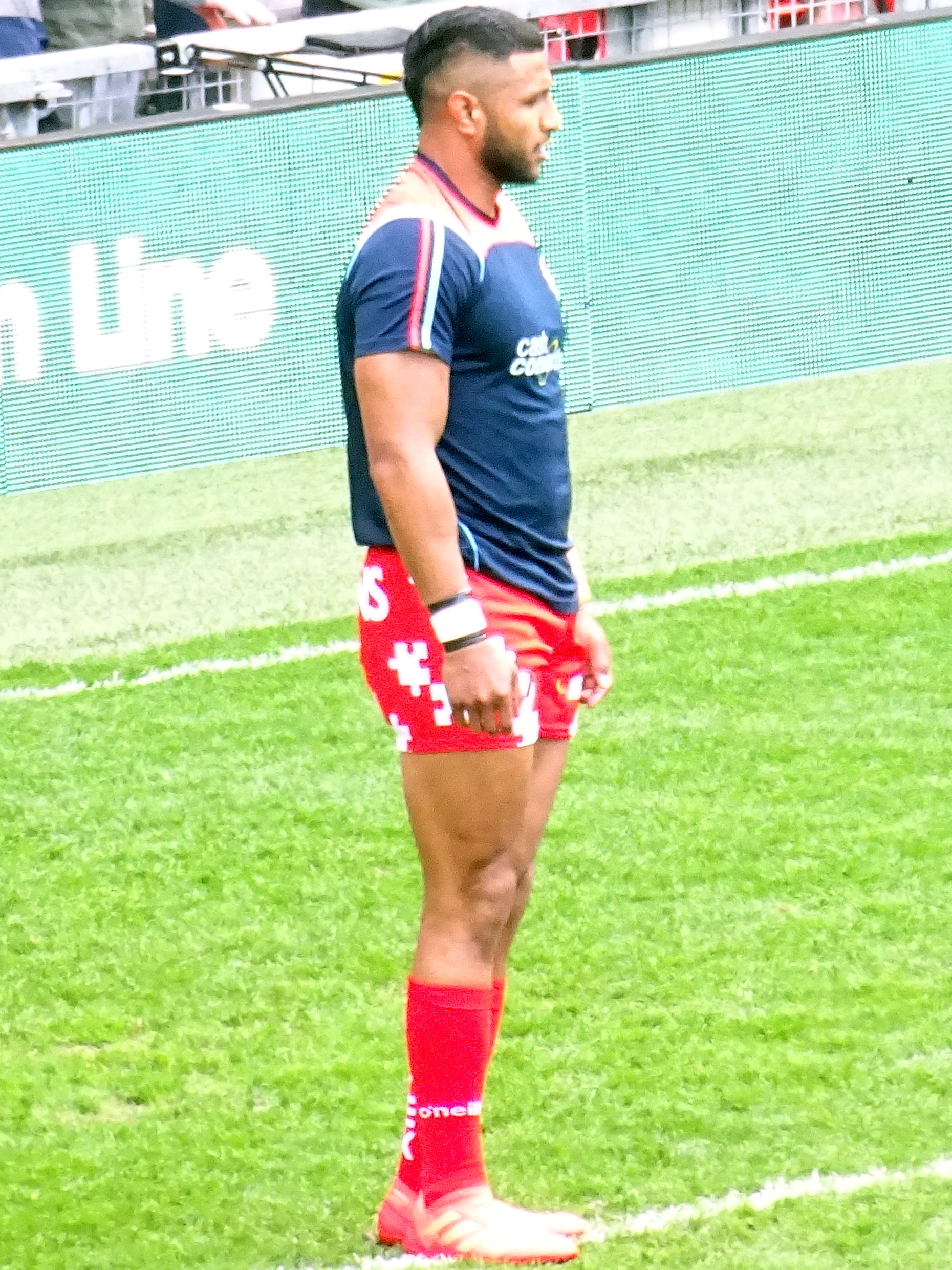

Personal information
- Full name: Dominique Peyroux
- Born: 21 January 1989 (age 37) Auckland, New Zealand
- Height: 6 ft 1 in (1.85 m)
- Weight: 15 st 4 lb (97 kg)

Playing information
- Position: Second-row, Centre
Club
Years	Team	Pld	T	G	FG	P
2011–12	Gold Coast Titans	16	3	0	0	12
2013–15	New Zealand Warriors	25	2	0	0	8
2016–20	St Helens	122	17	0	0	68
2021–25	Toulouse Olympique	62	26	0	0	104
2025–	Albi	12	3	0	0	0
	Total	237	51	0	0	192
Representative
Years	Team	Pld	T	G	FG	P
2009–22	Cook Islands	11	5	0	0	20
2014–15	Samoa	3	1	0	0	4
- Source: As of 8 November 2025

Dominique Peyroux (born 21 January 1989) is a professional rugby league footballer who plays as a second-row forward or centre for Villefranche XIII Aveyron in the Super XIII. He has played for the Cook Islands and Samoa at international level.

He previously played for the Gold Coast Titans and the New Zealand Warriors in the NRL, and St Helens in the Super League and also RC Albi in the Super XIII. Peyroux represented the Cook Islands at the 2009 Pacific Cup, 2013 World Cup and the 2021 World Cup, and Samoa at the 2014 Four Nations.

== Early years ==
Peyroux was born in Auckland, New Zealand, to a father of Cook Island and French descent and a mother of Samoan and Solomon Island descent.

He played junior rugby league for the Otahuhu Leopards, Mangere East Hawks, and Papatoetoe Panthers. He attended and played for the Sarah Redfern High School after moving to Australia with his family at age 15 to pursue his rugby league career. Peyroux signed with the Sydney Roosters, and then moved to Mattraville Sports High School in his final year of schooling, winning the AAC National Champions Trophy with the school in 2007.

== Playing career ==
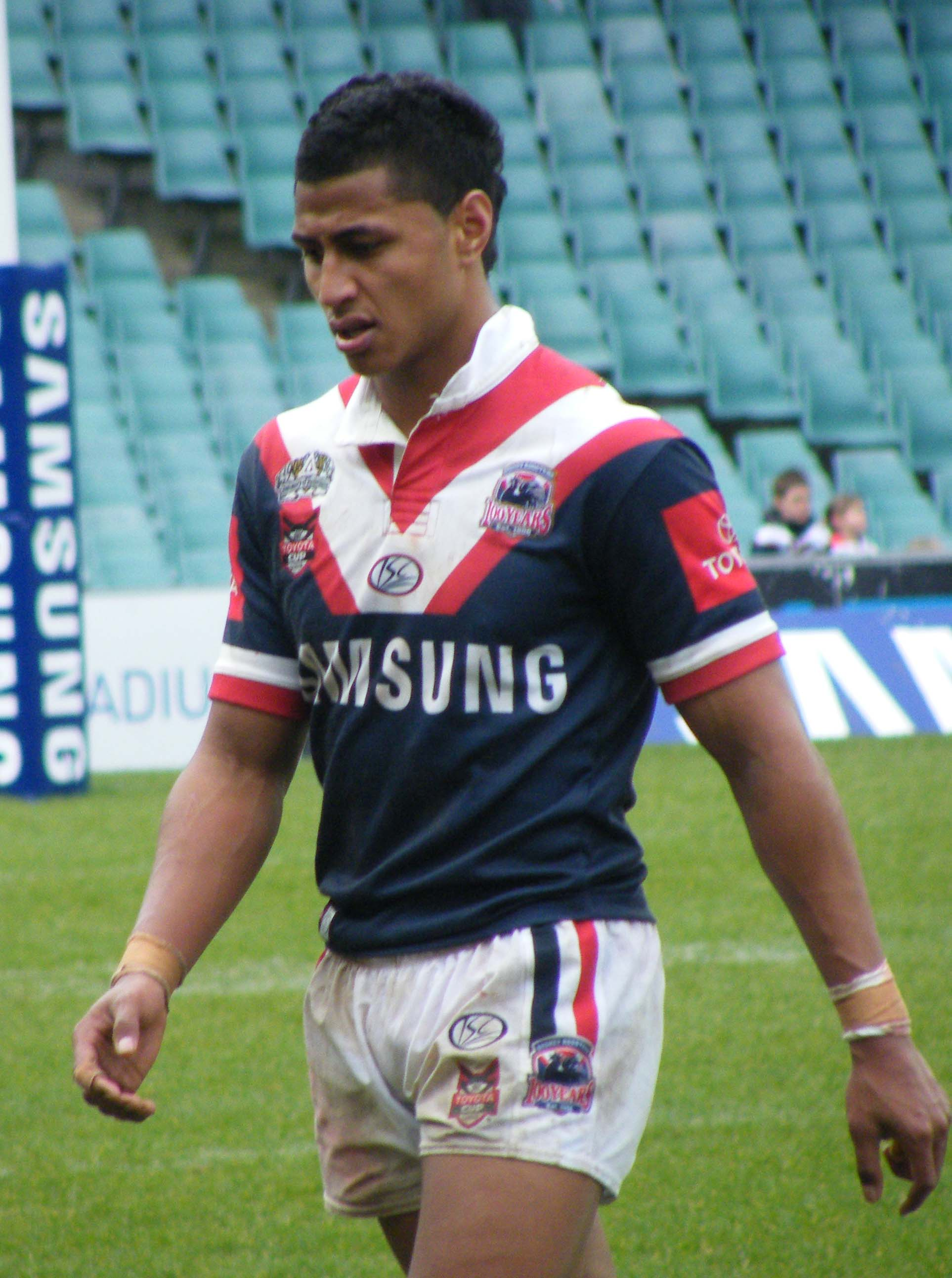
Peyroux in 2008

Peyroux signed professionally for the Sydney Roosters in 2007 but never featured for their first grade side, instead playing in the National Youth Competition in the Under 20 set-up. He then featured for Sydney's feeder side, the Newtown Jets, in the New South Wales Cup for the 2008 season, before joining the Gold Coast Titans. In 2010, he was dual registered with Tweed Heads Seagulls, a feeder club to the Titans.

He made his debut for the Titans in 2011 and played sixteen games for the club as they finished last on the table and claimed the wooden spoon.

Peyroux joined the New Zealand Warriors for the 2013 season and made his debut for the club on 3 June 2013.

He signed for St Helens, and started on a two-year contract at the beginning of 2016 season.

He played in the 2019 Challenge Cup Final defeat by the Warrington Wolves at Wembley Stadium.

He played in the 2019 Super League Grand Final victory over the Salford Red Devils at Old Trafford.

On 17 Nov 2020 it was announced that Peyroux would be joining his teammate Joseph Paulo at Toulouse Olympique for the 2021 season.

He played in St Helens 8-4 2020 Super League Grand Final victory over Wigan at the Kingston Communications Stadium in Hull.

=== Toulouse Olympique ===
On 17 November 2020, Toulouse announced the signing of Peyroux from St Helens on a two-year deal. On 10 October 2021, Peyroux played for Toulouse in their victory over Featherstone in the Million Pound Game which saw the club promoted to the Super League for the first time in their history. On 15 October 2023, Peyroux played in Toulouse Olympique's upset loss against the London Broncos in the RFL Championship Grand Final.

On 20 October 2025 it was reported that he had left Toulouse Olympique

=== Albi ===
On 8 November 2025 it was reported that he had signed for Albi in the Super XIII for the remainder of the 2025/26 season

== Representative career ==
Peyroux was selected for the Cook Islands for their 2009 Pacific Cup competition in October 2009 and featured against Samoa, in a 22–20 win to qualify for the group stages, and against Fiji in another narrow win; 24–22 in which Peyroux, playing on the wing, scored twice, the second of which being the match-winning try in the final minute. This win guided them to the final against Papua New Guinea on 1 November 2009. They lost this final by 42–14, a game in which Peyroux scored his third try in as many games in the tournament.

In October and November 2013, Peyroux played for 'the Kukis' in their 2013 Rugby League World Cup campaign. He scored a try in 2 of their 3 games in the tournament.

In May 2014, Peyroux played for another Pacific Island Nation. He represented Samoa in the 2014 Pacific Rugby League International.

On 7 October 2014, Peyroux was selected in the Samoan 24-man squad for the 2014 Four Nations series. He was only used once in the campaign.

On 2 May 2015, Peyroux scored the winning try after a line-break in their Polynesian Cup match against Tonga.

== Statistics ==
Year	Team	Games	Tries	Pts
2011	Gold Coast Titans	4	1	4
2012	Gold Coast Titans	12	2	8
2013	Warriors	12		
2014	Warriors	4	1	4
2015	Warriors	8	1	4
2016	St Helens	22	2	8
2017	St Helens	24	2	8
2018	St Helens	28	4	16
2019	St Helens	32	8	32
2020	St Helens	16	1	4
2021	Toulouse	11	9	36
2022	Toulouse	16	2	8
2023	Toulouse	14	5	20
2024	Toulouse	20	9	36
2025	Toulouse	1		
	Totals	224	43	172

== Personal life ==
Whilst playing for the Roosters in 2008, Peyroux featured in the Naked for a Cause initiative Gods of Football in which AFL and ARL players compiled a nude calendar to raise money for breast cancer charity the McGrath Foundation.
