= Steve Ganson =

English rugby league referee & refereeing administrator

Stephen Ganson
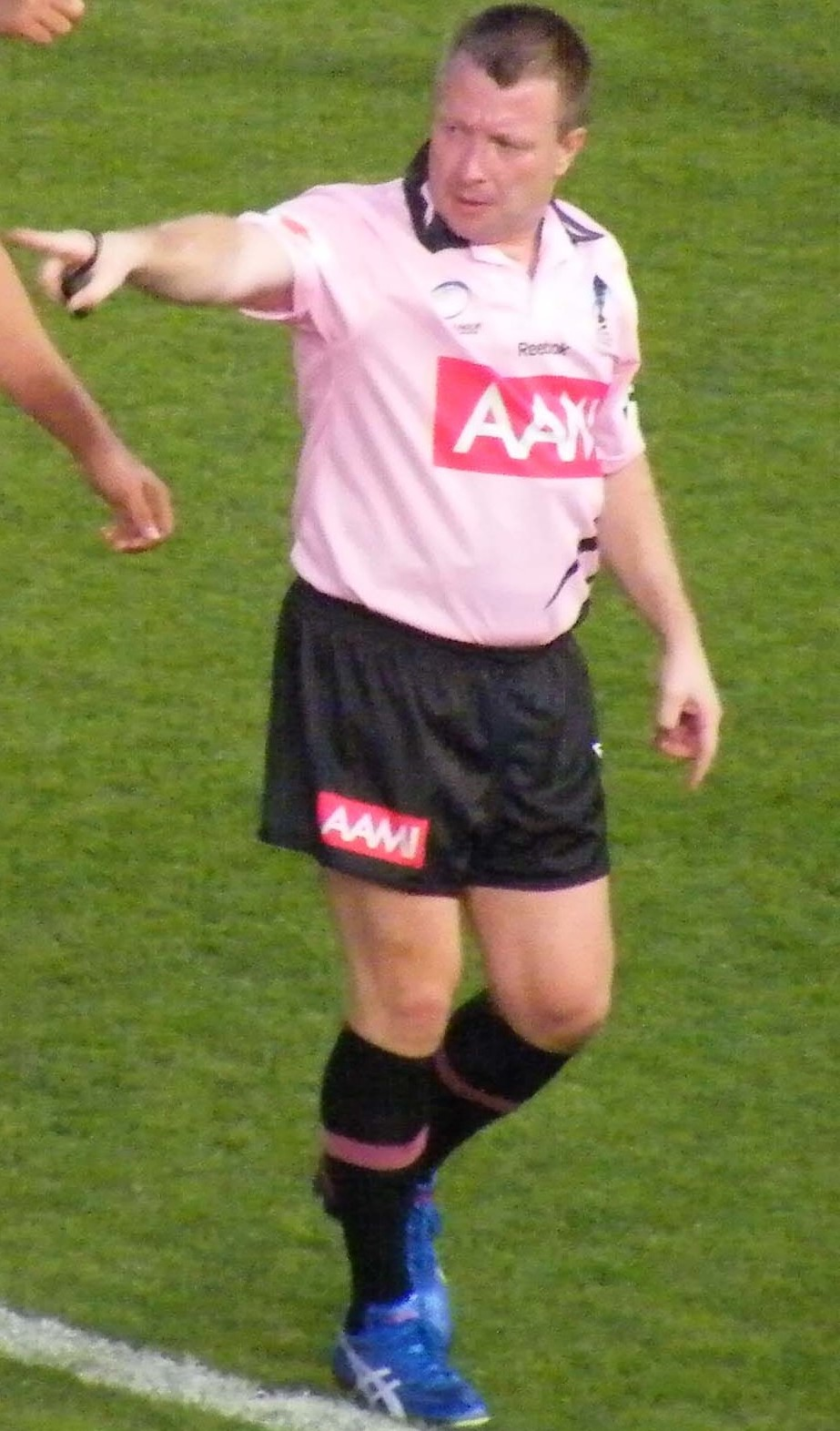

Personal information
- Born: 4 January 1970 (age 55); St Helens, Lancashire, England

Refereeing information
Years	Competition	Apps
1996–2013	Super League	311
2007–2009	Challenge Cup	7
2000–2009	Internationals	15
- Source: As of 17 October 2009

Steve Ganson (born 4 January 1970 in St. Helens, Lancashire, England) is a former rugby league referee, and former Head of Match Officials and Technical Director with the English Rugby Football League. He is the second professional referee from the town as Premier League referee Chris Foy also hails from St Helens. On 12 April 2013, Ganson retired his role as referee to take up the role of Match Officials Coach and Technical Director.

His son, Josh Ganson has followed in his footsteps by playing for the Wigan Warriors in the Super League.

== First games ==
His first professional game was Barrow v Carlisle on 27 August 1995.

His first Super League game was Castleford v Paris Saint-Germain on 17 August 1996.

== Head of Match Officials (2016–2023) ==
On 15 January 2023, it was reported, that Ganson had been stood down from his role, pending a review from the RFL.

In a statement, the RFL said: “Steve Ganson will not be carrying out his role as Head of Match Officials at the current time, pending the completion of an internal review. Currently, it is expected that this will be temporary and the RFL will make no further comment until that review is complete.

== International ==
He has refereed in the 2000 & 2008 Rugby League World Cups.

- He has refereed England v Wales in 2008.
- He has refereed Italy v Scotland on 17 October 2009 in the Rugby League European Cup.
- He has refereed Australia v New Zealand on 24 October 2009 in the 4 Nations.
- He has refereed England v Australia on 31 October 2009 in the 4 Nations.
