= Joel Taufaʻao =

Australian-born Tongan rugby league footballer

Joel Taufa’ao
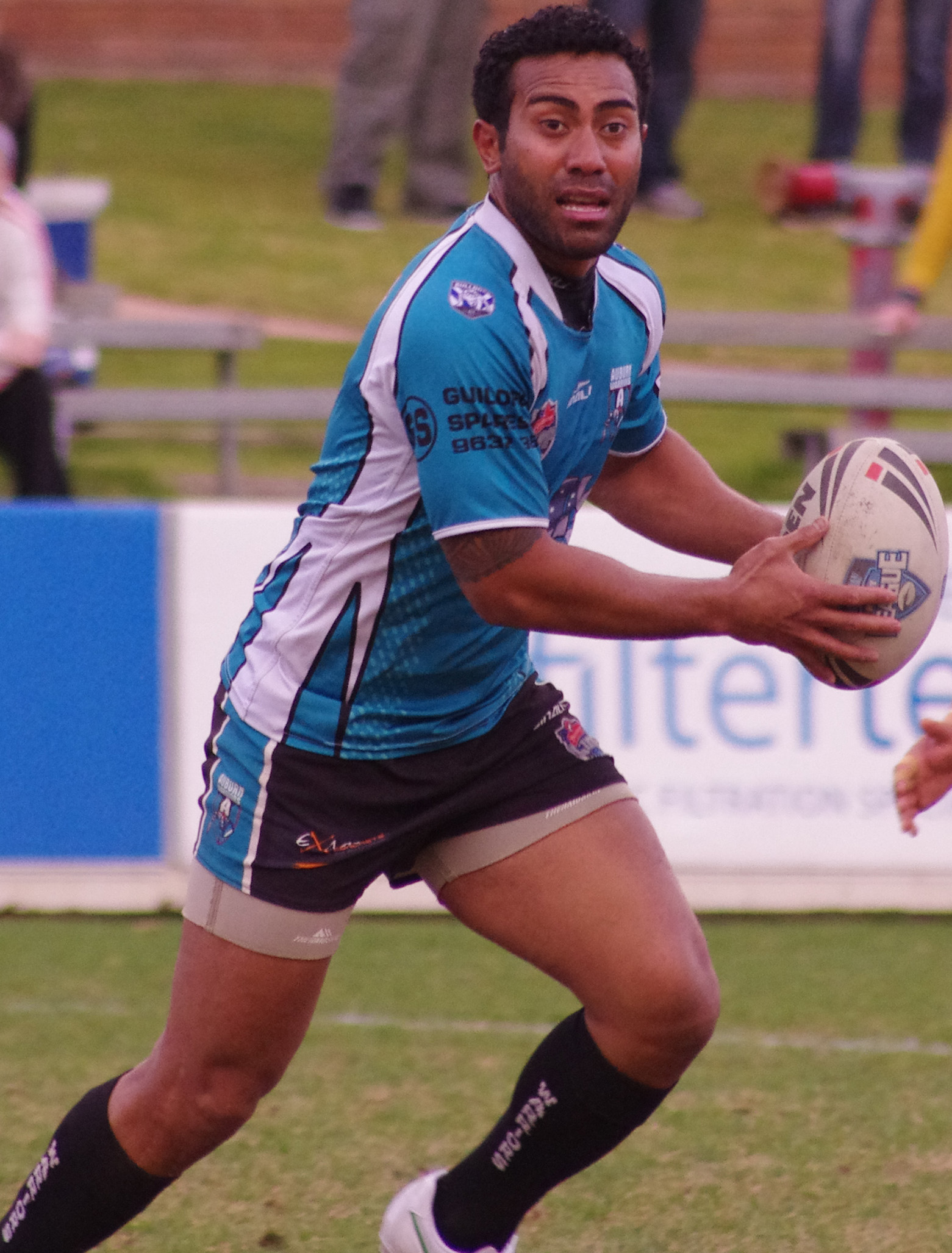

Personal information
- Full name: Joel Leone Taufa'ao
- Born: Newcastle, Australia

Playing information
- Position: Halfback, Centre
Representative
Years	Team	Pld	T	G	FG	P
2006–09	Tonga	7	0	2	0	4
- Source: As of 8 November 2008

Joel Taufa’ao (birth unknown) is an Australian rugby league footballer who played in the 2000s. He played at representative level for Tonga, and at club level for the South Sydney Rabbitohs (Reserve grade) in the National Rugby League (NRL), as a halfback.

== Background ==
Joel Taufaʻao was born in Newcastle, New South Wales, Australia.

== Playing career ==
Taufa'ao has also appeared on several occasions for Tonga including at the 2006 Pacific Cup and Federation Shield competitions.

In August 2008, Taufa'ao was named in the Tonga training squad for the 2008 Rugby League World Cup, and in October 2008 he was named in the final 24-man Tonga squad.
