= 2021 London Broncos season =

- 2021 Championship Rank: 7th
- Play-off result: N/A
- Challenge Cup: 2nd round
- 2021 record: Wins: 12; draws: 1; losses: 8
- Points scored: For: 578; against: 577

Team information
- Chairman: David Hughes
- Head Coach: Danny Ward (resigned 6 July); Tom Tsang (7 July onwards)
- Captain: Will Lovell
- Stadium: The Rock; Trailfinders Sports Ground
- Avg. attendance: 331 (COVID-19 restricted)
- High attendance: 500 (COVID-19 restricted)

Top scorers
- Tries: Abbas Miski - 18
- Goals: Chris Hankinson - 83
- Points: Chris Hankinson - 206
Home colours	Away colours
← 2020	List of seasons	2022 →

The 2021 London Broncos season is the 42nd year in the club's history, the second consecutive season out of the Super League and their sixth season at Trailfinders Sports Ground. Currently coached by Tom Tsang, the Broncos would compete in both the 2021 Betfred Championship and the 2021 Challenge Cup.

== 2021 squad ==
London Broncos 2021 Squad
First team squad			Coaching staff
1 (England) James Meadows – SO, FB; 2 (Nigeria) Tuoyo Egodo – WG; 3 (England) Chris Hankinson – CE; 4 (England) Will Lovell (c) – CE, SR; 5 (Ireland) Ed Chamberlain – FB, CE, WG; 6 (England) Cory Aston – SO, SH; 7 (Malta) Jarrod Sammut – SH, SO; 8 (Albania) Olsi Krasniqi – PR; 9 (Wales) Matty Fozard – HK; 10 (England) Greg Richards – PR; 11 (Nigeria) Sadiq Adebiyi – LF, PR; 12 (France) Rhys Curran – SR; 13 (England) Josh Walters – SR	14 (England) Sam Davis – HK; 16 (England) Dan Hindmarsh – SR; 17 (Lebanon) Abbas Miski – WG; 18 (England) Jordan Williams – SR; 19 (Jamaica) Jacob Ogden – CE; 20 (Ghana) Gideon Boafo – WG; 21 (England) Rian Horsman – SH, HK; 22 (England) Oli Leyland – SH, HK; 23 (England) Josh Hodson – CE, WG; 24 (England) Will Blakemore – LF; 25 (England) Jacob Jones – SR; 26 (England) Rob Oakley – HK	27 (Peru) Jonah Varela – WG, CE; 28 (Zimbabwe) Titus Gwaze – PR; 31 (Ireland) Pat Moran – PR	Head coach: (England) Tom Tsang; Assistant coach: (England) Mike Eccles; Legend: (c) Captain(s); (vc) Vice-captain(s); Injured; Updated: 21 March 2021; Source(s): First Team

== Transfers ==
Gains

Gains
Player	Previous club	Date Announced
(Wales) Matty Fozard	Ottawa Aces	December 2020 (Note: Rejoined the London Broncos in December 2020)
(Ireland) Ed Chamberlain	Salford Red Devils	December 2020
(England) Chris Hankinson	Wigan Warriors	December 2020
(Lebanon) Abbas Miski	Manly Sea Eagles	December 2020
(Malta) Jarrod Sammut	Leigh Centurions	December 2020
(France) Romain Navarrete	Wigan Warriors	January 2021
(Zimbabwe) Titus Gwaze	Wakefield Trinity	February 2021
(Tonga) Paulos Latu	Limoux Grizzlies	March 2021
(Ireland) Pat Moran	SO Avignon	May 2021

Losses

Losses
Player	Signed for	Date Announced
(Wales) Matty Fozard	Ottawa Aces	August 2020 (Note: Did not play for the Ottawa Aces due to impact of Covid-19)
(England) Olly Ashall-Bott	Ottawa Aces	August 2020 (Note: Did not play for the Ottawa Aces due to impact of Covid-19)
(England) Guy Armitage	Ottawa Aces	September 2020
(England) Morgan Smith	York City Knights	September 2020
(France) Eloi Pelissier	Toulouse Olympique	October 2020
(England) Rob Butler	Warrington Wolves	November 2020
(England) Kieran Dixon	York City Knights	November 2020
(England) Dan Norman	St Helens	December 2020
(England) Olly Ashall-Bott	Huddersfield Giants	January 2021 (Note: Huddersfield contract signed in January 2021)
(England) Eddie Battye	Wakefield Trinity	January 2021
(Tonga) Paulos Latu		
(France) Romain Navarrete	Toulouse Olympique	July 2021

== Tables ==
=== 2021 Betfred Championship table - Regular Season ===
Pos	Team	Pld	W	D	L	PF	PA	PP	Pts	PCT	Qualification (Note: Teams must have played at least 70% of scheduled fixtures (16 matches) to qualify for the play-offs. Fixtures involving Toulouse that are cancelled due to quarantine restrictions do not count against either team involved in respect of the 70% requirement.)
1	Toulouse Olympique (Note: Toulouse were awarded the fixture against London scheduled for 17 April after London declined to travel to France. Toulouse are awarded the two competition points and for points scored percentage the score is recorded as a 24–0 win for Toulouse. The game does not count towards the number of games played by London to determine eligibility for the play-offs)	14	14	0	0	698	124	562.9	28	100.00	Championship Leaders' Shield & advance to semi-final
2	Featherstone Rovers	21	20	0	1	943	292	322.9	38 (Note: Featherstone deducted 2 points for breach of the RFL Operational Rules in March 2021.)	90.48	Advance to semi-final
3	Halifax Panthers	21	13	0	8	528	354	149.2	26	61.90	Advance to eliminators
4	Batley Bulldogs	21	13	0	8	561	411	136.5	26	61.90	Advance to eliminators
5	Bradford Bulls	20	12	0	8	514	501	102.6	24	60.00	Advance to eliminators
6	Whitehaven	22	12	1	9	502	524	95.8	25	56.82	Advance to eliminators
7	London Broncos	20	11	1	8	552	579	95.3	21 (Note: London deducted 2 points for breach of the RFL Operational Rules in failing for fulfil the fixture against Toulouse in April 2021.)	52.50	
8	Widnes Vikings	21	9	1	11	494	534	92.5	19	45.24	
9	York City Knights	20	9	0	11	502	477	105.2	18	45.00	
10	Dewsbury Rams	21	8	1	12	360	608	59.2	17	40.48	
11	Newcastle Thunder	20	7	1	12	431	627	68.7	15	37.50	
12	Sheffield Eagles	20	5	3	12	420	665	63.2	13	32.50	
13	Oldham	21	2	1	18	308	748	41.2	5	11.90	Relegated to League 1
14	Swinton Lions	22	2	1	19	404	773	52.3	5	11.36	Relegated to League 1

Rules for classification: 1) win percentage; 2) points scored percentage (points scored divided by points conceded).

== 2021 fixtures and results ==
=== 2021 RFL Championship ===
Date	Competition	Round	Versus	Venue	Home or Away	Result	Score	Tries	Goals	Att	Live on TV	Report
4 April 2021	2021 RFL Championship	1	Halifax Panthers	The Shay	Away	Loss	47-14	Miski (2), Egodo	Fozard	0	OurLeague	
18 April 2021	2021 RFL Championship	2	Toulouse Olympique	Stade Ernest-Wallon	Away	Cancelled	24–0					
25 April 2021	2021 RFL Championship	3	Oldham	The Rock	Home	Won	38-24	Egodo (3), Sammut (2), Hindmarsh, Walters	Hankinson (5)	0	OurLeague	
1 May 2021	2021 RFL Championship	4	Sheffield Eagles	Keepmoat Stadium	Away	Draw	20–20	Egodo, Miski (3)	Hankinson, Sammut	0	OurLeague	
9 May 2021	2021 RFL Championship	5	Newcastle Thunder	The Rock	Home	Won	50–30	Fozard, Hankinson, Miski (2), Boafo (2), Richards, Sammut	Hankinson (8), Sammut	0	OurLeague	
15 May 2021	2021 RFL Championship	6	Batley Bulldogs	Mount Pleasant	Away	Won	6–40	Walters, Hankinson (2), Miski, Curran, Jones, Boafo	Hankinson (6)	0	OurLeague	
23 May 2021	2021 RFL Championship	7	Bradford Bulls	Trailfinders Sports Ground	Home	Loss	8-33	Curran	Hankinson (2)		OurLeague	
30 May 2021	2021 RFL Championship	8	Dewsbury Rams	Trailfinders Sports Ground	Home	Won	30-10	Walters (2), Fozard, Aston, Meadows	Hankinson (5)		OurLeague	
13 June 2021	2021 RFL Championship	9	Widnes Vikings	Halton Stadium	Away	Won	22-24	Miski, Curran, Navarrete, Gwaze	Hankinson (4)		OurLeague	
20 June 2021	2021 RFL Championship	10	Whitehaven	Trailfinders Sports Ground	Home	Won	46-12	Hankinson (2), Meadows, Hodson, Gwaze, Curran, Aston, Sammut	Hankinson (7)		OurLeague	
27 June 2021	2021 RFL Championship	11	Swinton Lions	Trailfinders Sports Ground	Home	Won	38-24	Boafo (3), Miski (2), Lovell, Sammut	Hankinson (5)		OurLeague	
3 July 2021	2021 RFL Championship	12	Featherstone Rovers	Post Office Road	Away	Loss	14-63	Hankinson, Sammut, Miski	Hankinson		OurLeague	
11 July 2021	2021 RFL Championship	13	York City Knights	Trailfinders Sports Ground	Home	Won	50-20					
25 July 2021	2021 RFL Championship	14	Widnes Vikings	Trailfinders Sports ground	Home	Bye						
1 August 2021	2021 RFL Championship	15	Oldham	Bower Fold	Away	Won	20-30					
8 August 2021	2021 RFL Championship	16	Toulouse Olympique	Trailfinders Sports Ground	Home	Loss	6-66					
15 August 2021	2021 RFL Championship	17	Whitehaven	The Recreation Ground	Away	Loss	32-18					
22 August 2021	2021 RFL Championship	18	Newcastle Thunder	Kingston Park	Away	Bye						
29 August 2021	2021 RFL Championship	19	Sheffield Eagles	Venue TBC	Home	Won	42-12					
5 September 2021	2021 RFL Championship	20	Swinton Lions	Heywood Road	Away	Won	34-32					
12 September 2021	2021 RFL Championship	21	Featherstone Rovers	Venue TBC	Home	Loss	28-48					
19 September 2021	2021 RFL Championship	22	York City Knights	York Community Stadium	Away	Loss	32-22					

=== 2021 Challenge Cup / 2021 RFL 1895 Cup ===
Date	Competition	Round	Versus	Venue	Home or Away	Result	Score	Tries	Goals	Att	Live on TV	Report
20 March 2021	2021 Challenge Cup / 2021 RFL 1895 Cup	Round 1	Keighley Cougars	The Rock	Home	Won	24-10	Boafo, Jones, Davis, Navarrete	Hankinson (4)	0	OurLeague	
28 March 2021	2021 Challenge Cup / 2021 RFL 1895 Cup	Round 2	York City Knights	The Rock	Home	Lost	2-14		Chamberlain	0	BBC	

== Statistics ==
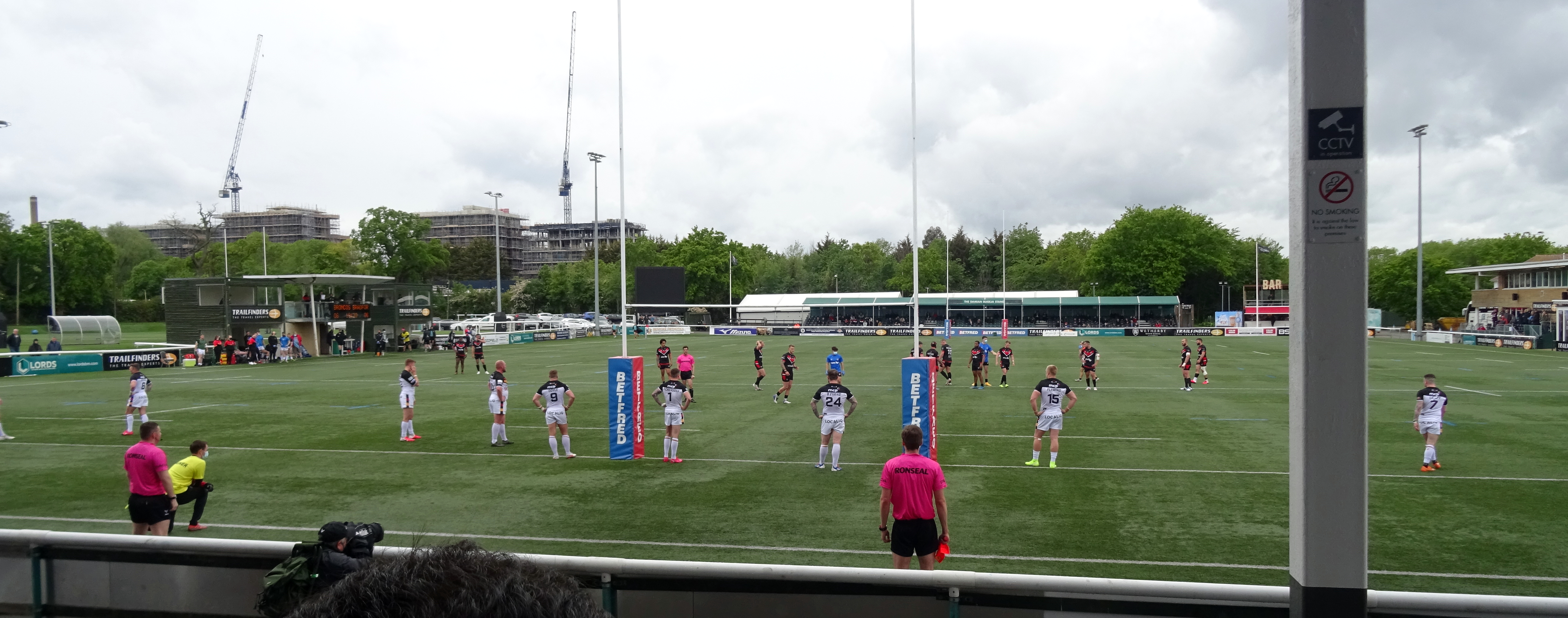
London kicking a goal against the Bradford Bulls, in the first match back at the Trailfinders Sports Ground, and the first match with spectators allowed to attend

Squad Number	Name	International country	Position	Age	Previous club	Appearances	Tries	Goals	Drop Goals	Points
1	James Meadows	(England)	Stand-off	21	London Broncos Academy	19	2	0	0	8
2	Tuoyo Egodo	(Nigeria)	Wing	24	Castleford Tigers	9	6	0	0	24
3	Chris Hankinson	(England)	Centre	27	Wigan Warriors	19	10	93	0	206
4	Will Lovell	(England)	Centre	27	London Skolars	19	3	0	0	12
5	Ed Chamberlain	(Ireland)	Wing	25	Salford Red Devils	7	0	1	0	2
6	Cory Aston	(England)	Stand-off	26	Castleford Tigers	7	2	0	0	8
7	Jarrod Sammut	(Malta)	Scrum-half	34	Leigh Centurions	13	7	2	0	32
8	Olsi Krasniqi	(Albania)	Prop	28	Toronto Wolfpack	3	0	0	0	0
9	Matty Fozard	(Wales)	Hooker	26	Sheffield Eagles	13	3	1	0	14
10	Greg Richards	(England)	Prop	25	Leigh Centurions	21	3	0	0	12
11	Sadiq Adebiyi	(Nigeria)	Loose forward	24	London Broncos Academy	3	1	0	0	4
12	Rhys Curran	(France)	Second-row	31	Toulouse Olympique	13	5	0	0	20
13	Josh Walters	(England)	Second-row	26	Featherstone Rovers	18	6	0	0	24
14	Sam Davis	(England)	Hooker	22	London Broncos Academy	10	1	0	0	4
15	Romain Navarette	(France)	Prop	26	Wigan Warriors	11	2	0	0	8
16	Dan Hindmarsh	(England)	Second-row	22	London Broncos Academy	20	1	0	0	4
17	Abbas Miski	(Lebanon)	Wing	25	Manly Sea Eagles	21	18	0	0	72
18	Jordan Williams	(England)	Second-row	23	London Skolars	11	0	0	0	0
19	Jacob Ogden	(Jamaica)	Centre	22	London Broncos Academy	8	1	0	0	4
20	Gideon Boafo	(Ghana)	Wing	22	London Broncos Academy	13	16	0	0	64
21	Rian Horsman	(England)	Hooker	20	London Broncos Academy	8	0	0	0	0
22	Oli Leyland	(England)	Hooker	20	London Broncos Academy	10	1	0	0	4
23	Josh Hodson	(England)	Wing	20	London Broncos Academy	17	4	0	0	16
24	Will Blakemore	(England)	Loose forward	-	London Broncos Academy	3	0	0	0	0
25	Jacob Jones	(England)	Second-row	-	London Broncos Academy	20	5	0	0	20
26	Rob Oakley	(England)	Hooker	-	London Broncos Academy	7	0	0	0	0
27	Jonah Varela	(Peru)	Wing	-	London Broncos Academy	0	0	0	0	0
28	Titus Gwaze	(Zimbabwe)	Prop	21	Wakefield Trinity	20	3	0	0	12
30	Paulos Latu	(Tonga)	Prop	28	Limoux Grizzlies	2	0	0	0	0
31	Pat Moran	(Ireland)	Prop	23	SO Avignon	12	1	0	0	4

== Player appearances ==
No	Player	1 CC	2 CC	1	3	4	5	6	7	8	9	10	11	12	13	15	16	17	19	20	21	22
1	Jimmy Meadows	SO		SH	FB		SH	SH	SH	FB	FB	FB	SO	SO	SO	SH	SO	SO	SO	SO	SO	SH
2	Tuoyo Egodo			WG	WG	WG			WG						WG	WG	WG			SUB		WG
3	Chris Hankinson	CE			CE	CE	CE	CE	CE	CE	CE	CE	CE	CE	CE	SO	CE	CE	FB	FB	FB	FB
4	Will Lovell	CE	CE	CE	SR	CE	CE	CE	CE	CE	CE	CE	CE	CE	SR	SR	SR		CE	CE		SR
5	Ed Chamberlain	FB	FB	FB		FB		FB	FB													CE
6	Cory Aston	SH			SO	SH			SO	SO	SO	SO										
7	Jarrod Sammut				SH	FB	SO	SO		SUB	SUB	SH	SH	SH	SH	SUB	SH					SUB
8	Olsi Krasniqi	PR	PR	PR																		
9	Matty Fozard			HK	HK	HK	HK	HK	HK	SH	SH							HK	HK	HK	HK	HK
10	Greg Richards	SUB	SUB	SUB	LF	LF	PR	PR	PR	PR	LF	LF	PR	SR	PR	PR	PR	PR	PR	PR	PR	PR
11	Sadiq Adebiyi																			SUB	SUB	SR
12	Rhys Curran	SR				PR	SR	SR	SR	SR	SR	SR	SR			SR	SR	SR	SR			
13	Josh Walters	LF	SR	SR	SR	SR	LF	SR	SR	SR				HK	SR	LF	LF	SR	SR	SR	SR	LF
14	Sam Davis	HK	HK		SUB	SUB	SUB	SUB	SUB	HK	HK	HK										
15	Romain Navarrete	PR	PR	PR	PR	PR		PR	PR	SUB	SUB	SUB		LF								
16	Daniel Hindmarsh-Takyi		LF	SUB	SUB	SUB	PR	LF	LF	SUB	SUB	SUB	LF	SUB	LF	SUB	SUB	LF	LF	LF	LF	SUB
17	Abbas Miski	WG	WG	WG	WG	WG	WG	WG	WG	WG	WG	WG	FB	FB	WG	WG	WG	WG	WG	WG	WG	WG
18	Jordan Williams		SUB		PR		SUB	SUB	SUB	SUB			SUB	PR		SUB		SUB		SUB		
19	Jacob Ogden			SUB			SUB								SUB	CE	SUB	WG	CE		CE	
20	Gideon Boafo	WG	WG		SUB	SUB	WG	WG			SUB	SUB	WG	WG					WG	WG	WG	
21	Rian Horsman		SH	FB												SUB	SUB	SH	SH	SH	SH	
22	Oli Leyland		FB				FB						SUB	SUB	FB	FB	FB	FB			SUB	FB
23	Josh Hodson	SUB	CE	CE	CE					WG	WG	WG	WG	WG	CE	CE	CE	CE	SUB	CE	CE	CE
24	Will Blakemore			LF									SUB		SUB							
25	Jacob Jones	SR	SR	SR		SR	SR	SUB	SUB	LF	SR	SR	SR	SR	SUB	HK	HK	SUB	SUB	SR	SR	SUB
26	Rob Oakley											SUB	HK	SUB	HK			SUB	SUB		SUB	
28	Titus Gwaze	SUB	SUB	SUB	SUB	SUB	SUB	SUB	SUB	PR	PR	PR	SUB	PR	SUB		SUB	PR	SUB	SUB	SUB	PR
30	Paulos Latu	SUB	SUB																			
31	Pat Moran										PR	PR	PR	SUB	PR	PR	PR	SUB	PR	PR	PR	SUB
