= 2022 RFL 1895 Cup =

Rugby league competition in the United Kingdom

- Duration: 3 rounds + qualifying
- Number of teams: 5
- Winners: Leigh Centurions
- Runners-up: Featherstone Rovers
- Ray French Award: Edwin Ipape

The 2022 RFL 1895 Cup, known as the 2022 AB Sundecks 1895 Cup for sponsorship reasons, was the third playing of the RFL 1895 Cup, a rugby league football competition for clubs in the United Kingdom. The competition is for clubs who play below the top-tier Super League, with amateur clubs joining lower-tier professional clubs in qualification for the first time. The competition was played from April to May 2022. The final was played as a curtain raiser to the 2022 Challenge Cup Final at Tottenham Hotspur Stadium, London on 28 May 2022.

== Format and eligibility ==
All professional RFL member clubs below the Super League are eligible to participate in the 1895 Cup, as well as those amateur teams which entered the Challenge Cup. Newly formed Cornwall R.L.F.C. who play in League 1 decided not to enter the competition.

The 2021 competition had run with an altered format due to the disruption caused to that season by the COVID-19 pandemic. Under these changes, the early rounds of the 2021 Challenge Cup served as the opening rounds of the 1895 Cup, with the four teams which progressed from round 2 of the Challenge Cup also becoming semi-finalists of the 1895 Cup. That format was popular among teams, and so the 2022 tournament returned with an adapted version of that, reflecting the re-formatting of the Challenge Cup to facilitate the re-entry of amateur sides to that tournament.

This adapted format for 2022 saw five teams progress from round 5 of the Challenge Cup, and hence qualify for the 1895 Cup. Any Championship, League 1 or amateur team that subsequently won in round 6 of the Challenge Cup would qualify automatically for the semi-finals of the 1895 Cup. However, none of the five teams that reached round 6 of the Challenge Cup won. This fixed the format for the 1895 Cup with two of the five qualifiers competing in a play-off match on 9/10 April, to reduce the number of teams to four for the semi-finals on the 7/8 May, with the final held on the 28 May.

== Qualification ==
The five teams who won in the fifth round of the Challenge Cup, and therefore qualified for the 1895 Cup, were Sheffield Eagles, Barrow Raiders, Featherstone Rovers, Whitehaven and Leigh Centurions.

The draw for the play-off match and the semi-finals was made on 28 March.

== Play-off round ==
Due to ongoing building work at Sheffield's ground, the match was played at Featherstone Rovers's stadium.

Home	Score	Away	Match Information
Home	Score	Away	Date and Time	Venue	Referee	Attendance
Sheffield Eagles	40–6	Whitehaven	9 April 2022, 14:00	Post Office Road	A. Moore

== Semi-finals ==
Barrow, Featherstone and Leigh all received a bye to this round.

Home	Score	Away	Match Information
Home	Score	Away	Date and Time	Venue	Referee	Attendance
Barrow Raiders	6–46	Featherstone Rovers	8 May 2022, 14:00	Craven Park	T. Grant	1,804
Leigh Centurions	30–12	Sheffield Eagles	8 May 2022, 16:00	Leigh Sports Village	N. Bennett

== Final ==
Home	Score	Away	Match Information
Home	Score	Away	Date and Time	Venue	Referee	Attendance
Featherstone Rovers	16–30	Leigh Centurions	28 May 2022, 12:00	Tottenham Hotspur Stadium	L. Moore	4,350
