= Craig Farrell =

Craig Farrell may refer to:

- Craig Farrell (footballer) (1982–2022), English footballer
- Craig Farrell (rugby league) (born 1981), English rugby league player
- Craig Farrell (politician) (born 1964), Australian politician
