= Scarborough High School =

Scarborough High School may refer to:

== Canada ==
- R. H. King Academy - Scarborough, Ontario; formerly named Scarborough High School (1922–1930)

== United Kingdom ==
- Scarborough High School for Boys (Scarborough, North Yorkshire) – now Graham School
- Scarborough Girls' High School (Scarborough, North Yorkshire) – now Graham School
- Scarborough Sixth Form College
- Scarborough College

== United States ==
- Scarborough High School (Maine) - Scarborough, Maine
- Scarborough High School (Texas) - Houston, Texas

== See also ==
- Scarborough Day School
- Scarborough College
