= Graham School, Scarborough =

Graham School

Location
- Woodlands Drive; Scarborough, North Yorkshire, YO12 7QW; England; 54°16′46″N 0°26′29″W

Information
- Type: Academy
- Established: 1973
- Local authority: North Yorkshire
- Trust: Hope Learning Trust
- Department for Education URN: 146769 Tables
- Ofsted: Reports
- Head teacher: Emma Robins
- Gender: Coeducational
- Age: 11 to 16
- Enrolment: 1000+ pupils
- Former name: Scarborough High School for Boys
- Website: gra.hslt.academy

Graham School is a coeducational secondary school in Scarborough, England. It is situated to the west of the town within 22 acres (8.9 ha) of grounds. The school is on Woodlands Drive. The lower site on Lady Edith's Drive closed on 23 June 2017.

Graham School provides for pupils aged 11 to 16 (year 7 to year 11)

== History ==
The school is named after Mr C C Graham, Mayor of Scarborough between 1913 and 1919.

=== Grammar school ===
Prior to 1973, the buildings were used by Scarborough High School for Boys, a boys' grammar school. The present building designed by Keith Scott of Building Design Partnership's Preston office, was built by the North Riding Education Committee in the late 1950s, around the same time as Scarborough Technical College (now called Yorkshire Coast College). It had around 700 boys in the early 1970s.

=== Comprehensive ===
Only the first year was all-ability when it opened. Gradually over four years from 1973 it became a comprehensive. The former site of the Scarborough Girls' High School on Sandybed Lane, further to the south, became Scarborough Sixth Form College, although the girls aged under 16 from the school joined the Graham School, with boys from the other grammar school. For the first three years, it was mostly a mixed grammar school than a comprehensive.

In 1975 it took over the former Convent of Our Ladies of Mary High School for Girls, and these buildings became the lower school until 1984. The school at this time had specialist nautical studies courses, which were aimed at pupils wishing to pursue a career at sea.

It gained specialist Science College status in 2004. In 2009 it entered into a federation with Raincliffe School, a nearby secondary school. The Raincliffe School site, (now lower) Graham School, closed on 23 June 2017.

=== Academy ===
Previously a community school administered by North Yorkshire County Council, in March 2019 Graham School converted to academy status. The school is now sponsored by the Hope Learning Trust.

== Notable former teachers ==
- Jack Ellis (1912–2007), rugby union player, taught Classics at the Boys' High School.
- Jimmy Johnson (1908–1995), Labour MP from 1950 to 1959 for Rugby, and from 1964 to 1983 for Kingston upon Hull West, taught Geography from 1934 to 1944 at the Boys' High School.

== Notable former pupils ==
=== Scarborough High School for Boys ===
- Ray Bloom, cricketer, for Yorkshire
- Richard Caton CBE, crucial in the discovery of Alpha wave activity in the human brain
- John Wyrill Christian, metallurgist, and Professor of Physical Metallurgy from 1967 to 1988 at the University of Oxford
- Clive Clark, golfer and commentator
- Fred Feast, actor, most notably in Coronation Street
- Bill Foord, cricketer, for Yorkshire
- Gilbert Gray QC, barrister & Recorder 1972–1998, at the Old Bailey
- Geoff Hoyle, actor and entertainer
- John David Kennedy, Professor of Inorganic Chemistry at the University of Leeds
- Ted Lester, cricketer, for Yorkshire
- Harvey McGregor, Warden from 1985 to 1996 of New College, Oxford
- David McLintock, philologist and German translator
- John Mollon, Professor of Visual Neuroscience since 1998 at the University of Cambridge
- Bill Nicholson OBE, football player and manager of Tottenham Hotspur, most notably managing the club to the Double in season 1960–61
- Robert Palmer, singer & musician
- Harvey Proctor, Conservative MP from 1979 to 1983 for Basildon, and from 1983 to 1987 for Billericay
- Humphrey Razzall, Liberal Party (UK) Politician
- J. A. F. Rook, British chemist
- Peter Taylor, writer and documentary maker
- Nick Thomas, founder of Qdos Entertainment
- Ian Wilmut OBE, embryologist, led the team responsible for cloning the sheep, Dolly, worked at the University of Edinburgh
- John Foster Wilson CBE (blinded at the age of 12 in a school chemistry experiment), went on to found the International Agency for the Prevention of Blindness
- Michael Wilson, former business editor for Sky News

=== Convent of Our Ladies of Mary High School for Girls ===
Note that the Graham School took over some of the buildings of the Scarborough Convent School but was not its successor

- Susan Hill, author
- Nadine Senior, founder of the Northern School of Contemporary Dance

=== Scarborough Girls' High School ===
- Elizabeth Bell (actress)
- Jane Harrison (GC), died in April 1968 on board BOAC Flight 712

=== Graham School Science College ===
- Kriss Brining, Rugby league player, York and Salford
- Joy Brook, actress, most notably in The Bill and Peak Practice
- Michael Coulson, footballer, Scarborough & York City
- Craig Farrell (rugby league), many clubs including Hull FC and Hull Kingston Rovers
- Jonathon Fletcher, writer of JumpStation, the original internet search engine
- Billy Howle, actor, known for roles in Glue, Outlaw King, Star Wars: The Last Jedi and The Serpent
- Paul Ingle, International Boxing Federation, featherweight world champion
- Timothy Sheader, artistic director at Regent's Park Open Air Theatre
