= Razzall =

Razzall is a surname. Notable people with the surname include:

- Humphrey Razzall (1912–1999), British politician and solicitor
- Katie Razzall (born 1970), British journalist
- Tim Razzall, Baron Razzall (born 1943), British politician
