= Doncaster R.L.F.C. =

English rugby league club

Doncaster RLFC

Club information
- Full name: Doncaster Rugby League Football Club
- Nickname(s): The Dons, The Mighty Dons, Dons, Donny, The Blue&Golds, Blue White&Gold Army.
- Colours: Blue and Gold
- Founded: 1951; 75 years ago
- Exited: 1995; 31 years ago
- Readmitted: 1995; 31 years ago (as Doncaster Dragons) also formerly known in 2006 (as Doncaster Lakers)
- Website: doncasterrugbyleague.co.uk

details
- Ground: Club Doncaster Sports Village (15,231)
- CEO: Carl Hall
- Chairman: Terry Bramall
- Coach: Richard Horne
- Captain: Cory Aston
- Competition: Championship
- 2026 season: 4th (Grand Finalists, Runners Up)
- Current season

Uniforms
Home colours

Doncaster Rugby League Football Club is a professional rugby league football club, based in Doncaster, South Yorkshire, England. They play home games at the Club Doncaster Sports Village and currently compete in the Championship, the second tier of British rugby league.

Doncaster have never won any major honours, but have won a handful of lesser honours in the lower leagues.Their traditional home colours are a blue jersey with a single gold band across the chest, with a white collar, and with white shorts and blue and gold hooped socks. Leeds RLFC originally donated their home shirts to the newly formed Doncaster RLFC when they were founded in 1951.The Dons have a fierce rivalry with the only other South Yorkshire club, Sheffield Eagles. When they do meet, they usually battle for the coveted South Yorkshire Silver Cup in a league game or pre-season friendly game to see who will become the kings of South Yorkshire.

== History ==
=== 1951–1994: Foundation ===
On 18 August 1951, Doncaster made their league debut with a 10–3 win over Wakefield Trinity at York Road greyhound stadium. They would go on to finish their inaugural season in eleventh position. From 1956–1961, Doncaster finished every season as the bottom side in the Rugby Football League, and remained consistently in the bottom three between 1963 and 1968. The 1970s, and early 1980s proved to be no easier, with Doncaster only avoiding a bottom three finish on two occasions between 1970 and 1985.

In 1980, Yorkshire Television made a one-off documentary Another Bloody Sunday. The TV crew followed the Dons as they tried to avoid finishing the season without winning a single game.

John Sheridan became head coach of the Dons in 1984. The club had no money but Sheridan still managed to put together one of the Dons' best squads and went on to win 30 of the 44 games they played under him. He was replaced by his number-two Graham Hepptinstall after a few years but a players' revolt saw him come back for a second spell. He was voted the most influential person in the club's history by the Dons fans.

On Sunday 1 September 1991, Third Division rugby was introduced into British rugby league. Doncaster entertained Nottingham City that day with the home side winning by a club record 88–6.

Doncaster won eight consecutive games under Tony Fisher, but in the penultimate game of the 1994 season they fell to a surprise 20–2 away defeat to mid-table Rochdale Hornets as Workington Town beat Keighley to take top spot. Doncaster rescued their promotion chance when they won 10–5 in their final game away in front of a full house at Batley's Mount Pleasant, and the club won promotion to the First Division for the first time.

=== 1995–1997: Proposed South Yorkshire merger ===
In 1994–95 Tattersfield was the venue for a game against Widnes, broadcast live on Sky Television, which Doncaster won by 21–6. At that time, "The Dons" were at the top of Division 1. On 15 December 1994, Doncaster were already in trouble with debts of £1.4 million and were put into administration. The RFL took over the costs of running the club after an aborted attempt to merge the club with Sheffield Eagles. Doncaster were bought from administration by owners of Tattersfield ground in March 1995 but at the end of their one and only season in the top flight the club went into liquidation with debts of £1.4 million and the curtain closed on the Tattersfield era when the stadium was sold for housing development. The Dons played their last game at Tattersfield on 23 April 1995.

When a Rupert Murdoch funded Super League competition was proposed, part of the deal was that some traditional clubs would merge. Doncaster was to merge with Sheffield to form a South Yorkshire club that would compete in Super League. A meeting in Doncaster with Gary Hetherington from Sheffield Eagles was attended by 400 supporters and only 16 voted in favour; 3,000 people signed a petition against the merger and Doncaster survived as an unmerged club.

=== 1998–2004: Doncaster Dragons ===
The following a year, a new club called Doncaster Dragons rose from the ashes of the previous club, but was forced to restart life in the bottom division of the Rugby Football League. With Tattersfield gone they temporarily shared Belle Vue Stadium with association football club Doncaster Rovers while Meadow Court Stadium (another greyhound stadium in Stainforth, Doncaster) was being prepared for rugby league. The Dragons played at Meadow Court Stadium for a few years before returning to Belle Vue permanently for the beginning of the 1998 season.

In 1999, St. John Ellis was appointed head coach of Doncaster, he was too late to prevent them finishing 18th and last in the Premiership, making them the lowest-ranked club in the professional game. The following year, helped by some ambitious recruitment, they were third. One of Doncaster's achievements under Ellis was to become notoriously difficult to beat at home, with the Belle Vue ground unofficially renamed 'The House of Pain'. John Wright rescued Doncaster from liquidation in 2001 and oversaw the steady growth of the club, while St John remained coach.

=== 2005–2006: Doncaster Lakers ===
Doncaster wordmark, when the club renamed to "Doncaster Lakers"

At the end of the 2005 season Dragons was dropped and Doncaster Rugby League Club adopted the name Lakers to reflect the new Lakeside Community Stadium (now the Keepmoat Stadium), which would soon be their new home. The stadium, a purpose built community facility, would house both Lakers and Doncaster Rovers Football Club as well as women's football team Doncaster Belles. Tony Miller was appointed head coach for the 2006 season following the untimely death on New Year's Eve 2005, of St John Ellis. Singe, as he was known familiarly by fans, was rugby league's longest serving coach at the time.

Loyal Doncaster fans began to oppose the re-branding to Lakers, especially when the club's historic colours, blue and gold, were replaced with red, white and black.

The club parted company with Tony Miller in July 2006 and former Great Britain International Alan Hunte of Salford agreed to help the club in a short-term coaching role. The sacking of Tony Miller later led to him receiving £8,000 when he took the club to court. Australian Kieran Dempsey, formerly of Parramatta, was appointed head coach on a two-year contract in August 2006 and Phil Windley was appointed as his assistant.

Ellery Hanley was appointed head coach in December 2007. The 2007 season kicked off early for the Lakers, when they played host to a pre-season warm up against Sheffield Eagles on 27 December 2006. This was no ordinary game, as it marked the opening of the Keepmoat Stadium. Lakers, back in blue and gold, lost 16–10 in front of 5,400 spectators, the club's biggest crowd in a decade. The Lakers came bottom of their Northern Rail Cup group.

On 1 April 2007, Head Coach Keiran Dempsey and Assistant Coach Phil Windley were suspended pending an internal investigation and Gary Wilkinson was temporary placed in charge of the team. The following Friday (6 April 2007) saw the Lakers kick start the 2007 league campaign beating Sheffield Eagles 24–20 away from home.

Doncaster Home and Away Kits 2007

Six and a half thousand people attended the club's first game on live TV for over 10 years, on Thursday 12 April at the Keepmoat Stadium. The game shown live on Sky Sports saw Doncaster pummelled 66–4 against promotion favourites Castleford. It was announced by chairman John Wright that the club was having financial difficulties and would have to go into a CVA (Company Voluntary Agreement). The Lakers then went on to defeat joint top of the table Whitehaven 26–16. The match, which was promoted as possibly the last game of professional rugby league in Doncaster, attracted only 831 supporters. On Saturday 12 May chairman John Wright announced he was to resign from the club.

Lakers only just managed to put together a team against Rochdale Hornets away at Spotland on 20 May, after several players including Graham Holroyd and Danny Mills left the club. The team went on to lose 58–12 to the sound of the chant, 'We're proud of you' from the travelling fans. A few hours after the match, Coach Gary Wilkinson resigned. The following Tuesday (22 May), local lad and crowd favourite Peter Green was announced as Caretaker Coach. On Sunday 3 June, Lakers lost at home to Batley 48–14 and on the following Sunday 10 June at home, they suffered a massive 90–4 defeat at the hands of Widnes.Chairman John Wright announced that he would put the club in liquidation on 13 June if no buyers came forward. The crowd of over 1,200 applauded the loyal Doncaster players upon the final whistle. When Wednesday 13th came, it was announced that Doncaster-born businessmen Shane Miller and Craig Harrison had struck a deal with the RFL to set up a new club which would take over from the old one within National League 1.

On Tuesday 19 June 2007, Doncaster announced former St Helens and Widnes forward John Stankevitch as new head coach, taking over from Peter Green. On 28 June it was announced that the new owners had decided to ditch the Lakers moniker and revert to Doncaster RLFC. In the last home game of the 2007 season, 'the Dons' put on a brilliant performance to beat Dewsbury 51–18. For the final game of the season 'the Dons' travelled to the Shay to face Halifax. Former 'Don' Graham Holroyd ran the game for Halifax, leading them to a 52–24 victory, this result meant that Doncaster had finished bottom of the 2007 League table.

=== 2007–present: Doncaster RLFC ===
Former emblem

On 29 November 2007 it was announced on the official Doncaster website that head coach John Stankevitch had resigned, due to "personal reasons". On 14 December 2007, Ellery Hanley was unveiled as Stankevitch's replacement. The Dons were drawn into Northern Rail Cup Group 3 alongside London Skolars, Crusaders and South Yorkshire rivals Sheffield Eagles. The Dons qualified for the knock-out phase still with a game in hand by beating London at home and away as well as taking bonus points off Sheffield and Crusaders, who both play in a higher division. The Dons started the 2008 league campaign with a bang, winning three from three with 56–0, 54–12 and 36–18 wins. This saw them go top of the league at the end of March. Doncaster beat Oldham 18–10 in the National League Two Grand Final at Warrington to seal promotion alongside Gateshead and Barrow. Ellery Hanley resigned as coach, citing financial restraints.

2009 saw former player Carl Hall take over the club as part of a venture to secure the long term future of the club, and they were relegated from the Championship at the end of that season. The appointment of Tony Miller, Hanleys assistant, and former Dons player, as head coach, saw a new team built, and the side finished in mid-table of Championship One. Small improvements were seen in 2010 and 2011, as Miller rebuilt the playing side, with an improvement to the finishing position seen each year.

2012 saw Doncaster make their biggest statement in several years, as former Hull Kingston Rovers, Hull F.C. and Wakefield Trinity stand-off, Paul Cooke was convinced to come out of retirement, and ply his trade in Championship One. Behind Cooke, who secured the Championship One Player Of The Year, Doncaster won the League Leaders Shield as Barrow and Workington faltered with two games left, with a defeat of London Skolars. The game also saw Lee Waterman break the clubs tryscoring record. Having already secured promotion, Doncaster attempted to secure their second silverware of the season, by winning the Playoffs. This took a blow almost immediately, as straight from kickoff in the first match vs Barrow, the mercurial Cooke suffered a broken kneecap, ruling him out for the remainder of the season, and saw the side slump to a defeat in his absence. With a makeshift halfback partnership, Doncaster defeated Workington Town in the Semi Final to set up a rematch against Barrow at Warrington in the Play-off final. A close affair saw Barrow lead at half time, before Lee Waterman and Craig Fawcett scored tries, and a defensive effort in the last 10 minutes saw the Dons home to victory.

Association football side, Doncaster Rovers took over the club in 2013, and saw the club begin to operate under the auspices of 'Club Doncaster', a concept which sees the Football Club and Rugby Club share Commercial, Marketing and Media infrastructure, and saving on overheads. The 2013 season saw Doncaster consolidate their position in the Championship post promotion, with a Paul Cooke inspired side finishing in 4th position. In the 2021 League 1 season, Doncaster reached the playoff final against Workington Town but were defeated 36-12. In the 2022 League 1 season, Doncaster once again reached the playoff final with the opponents being Swinton. Doncaster lead in the final for most of the game until a late Swinton try saw Doncaster lose 16-10. Doncaster finished the 2023 season in third place and qualified for the playoffs. They would eventually reach the final against North Wales Crusaders where they won 18-6 to secure promotion back to the championship.

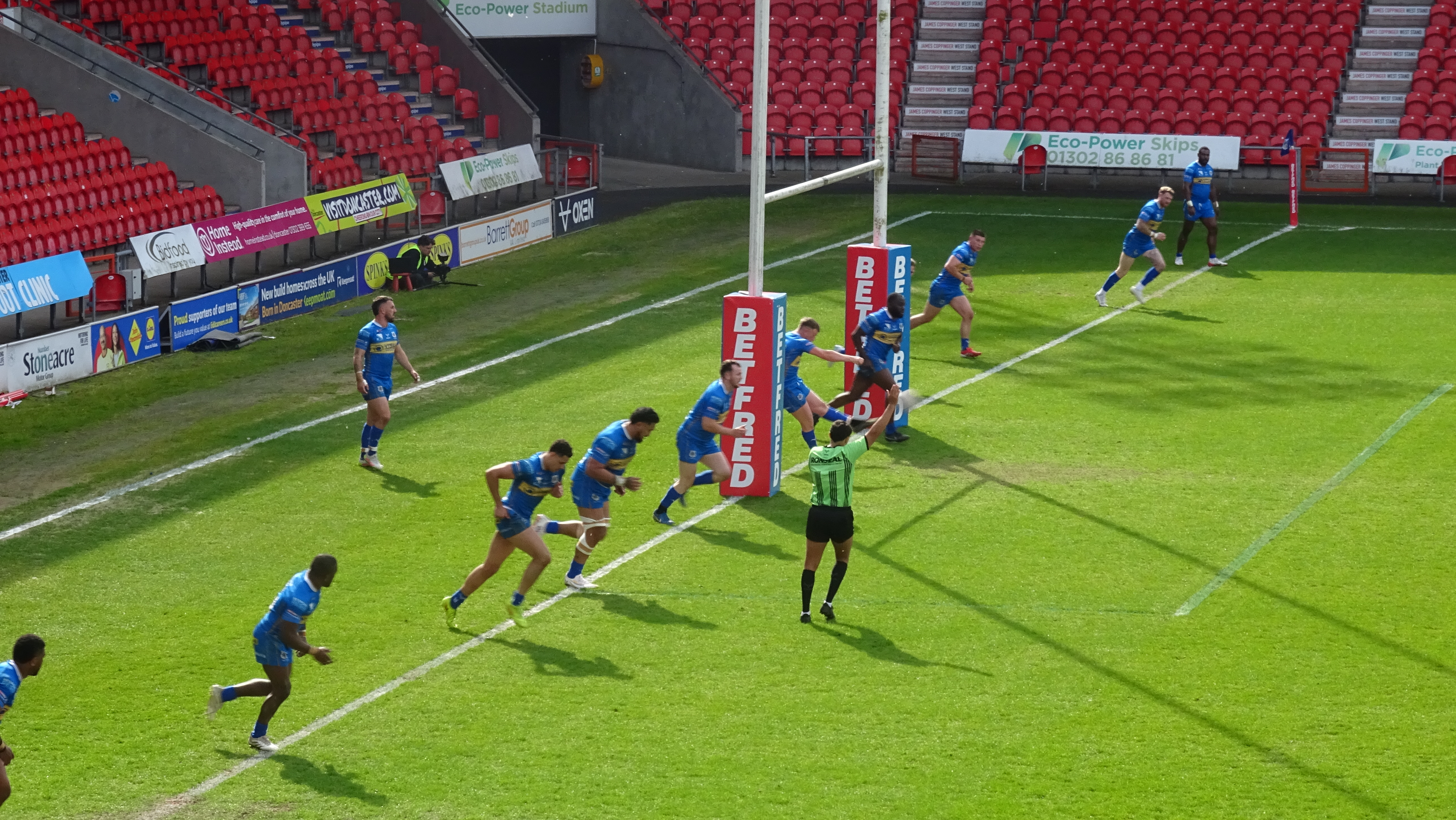
Doncaster kicking out from underneath their sticks in 2026

== Kit sponsors and manufacturers ==
| Years | Kit Manufacturer | Main Shirt Sponsor |
|---|---|---|
| 1990–1995 | Ellgren | none |
| 1996–1997 | Puma | Taylor Anderson |
| 1998–2002 | Bulldog | Resdev |
| 2003 | Kukri | Earth Mortgages |
| 2004 | Kukri | Furniture Factors |
| 2005–2006 | Impact | Doncaster College |
| 2007 | ISC | Lakeside Village |
| 2008–2009 | ISC | Centurion |
| 2010–2012 | K4 | Centurion |
| 2013–2016 | Fi-Ta | Centurion |
| 2017– | FBT | Centurion |

== 2027 squad ==
Doncaster RLFC 2027 Squad
| First team squad | | | Coaching staff |
|---|---|---|---|
| (Wales) Bailey Antrobus – SR, PR; (England) Cory Aston (c) – SO, SH; (Papua New Guinea) Watson Boas – SH, SO; (England) Greg Burns – HK; (Papua New Guinea) Edene Gebbie – WG, FB; (England) James Glover – CE, SO; (Zimbabwe) Titus Gwaze – PR | (New Zealand) Tyla Hepi – PR, SR; (England) Brad Hey – CE, LF; (England) Tom Holmes – FB, SO, SH; (England) Luis Johnson – SR; (Australia) Connor Jones – HK; (England) Jacob Jones – SR; (England) Lee Kershaw – WG; (England) Brad Knowles – PR, LF | (Samoa) Suaia Matagi – PR; (Nigeria) Muizz Mustapha – PR; (United States) Isaac Misky – HK; (England) Sam Smeaton – SR, CE; (England) Liam Sutcliffe – CE, SO; (Fiji) Mitieli Vulikijapani – WG, CE | Head coach: (England) Richard Horne; Assistant coaches: (Samoa) Misi Taulapapa; (England) Chris Plume; Legend: (c) Captain(s); (vc) Vice-captain(s); Updated: Source(s): |

== 2027 transfers ==
=== Gains ===
| Player | From | Contract | Date |
|---|---|---|---|
| (England) Liam Sutcliffe | Birmingham Hurricanes | 2 years | 10 November 2026 |
| (England) Lee Kershaw | Hull KR | 1 year | 15 November 2026 |
| (Wales) Bailey Antrobus | Newcastle Thunder | 2 years | 18 November 2026 |

=== Losses ===
| Player | From | Contract | Date |
|---|---|---|---|
| (Australia) Pauli Pauli | Dewsbury Rams | 1 year | 9 October 2026 |
| (England) Jordan Baldwinson | Hunslet | 1 year | 13 October 2026 |
| (United States) Bureta Faraimo | | | 20 October 2026 |
| (England) Loui McConnell | | | 20 October 2026 |
| (New Zealand) Andre Savelio | | | 20 October 2026 |
| (France) Gadwin Springer | | | 20 October 2026 |
| (England) Alex Sutcliffe | | | 20 October 2026 |

=== Retired ===
| Player | Date |
|---|---|
| (England) Luke Briscoe | 5 September 2026 |
| (England) Reece Lyne | 5 September 2026 |
| (England) Connor Robinson | 10 October 2026 |

== Players ==
=== Players earning international caps while at Doncaster ===
- Joseph "Joe" Berry Huddersfield, Doncaster, Rochdale Hornets and Batley 1998...2003 4-caps + 3-caps (sub)
- Dean Colton Doncaster 2008...present 1-cap
- Tyssul "Tuss" Griffiths won caps for Wales while at Hunslet and Doncaster 1946...1951 2-caps
- Neil Lowe won caps for Scotland Featherstone Rovers, Doncaster, York, and Keighley 1999...present 3-caps + 4-caps (sub)
- Pehi James "PJ" Solomon Lancashire Lynx and Doncaster 1997...2003 5-caps
- David Scott Represented Scotland in the 2013 World Cup.

=== Other notable former players ===
These players have either; received a Testimonial match, were international representatives before, or after, their time at Doncaster, or are notable outside of rugby league.

- Ade Adebisi
- Danny Allan
- Graham Arrand Wing, Centre 1960/70s, also North Sydney
- Tony "Cockney Rebel" Banham Prop
- James "Jimmy" Banks (1970s)
- Andreas Bauer
- Jamie Bloem
- Jean-Christophe Borlin
- John Buckton
- Luke Burgess
- Dean Carroll
- Michael Coady
- Ben Cockayne
- Billy Conway
- Trevor Denton (1970s)
- Peter Edwards
- St. John Ellis
- Craig Farrell
- Jamie Fielden
- Luke Gale
- Marvin Golden
- Peter Goodchild Wing Doncaster's first Yorkshire representative
- Peter Green
- Scott Grix
- Michael Haley
- Carl Hall
- Gareth Handford
- Paul Handforth
- Lee Harland
- Dennis Hartley
- Roy Hawksley
- Brad Hepi
- Terry Hermansson
- Sean Hesketh
- Merv Hicks
- Graham Holroyd
- Michael Hyde
- Ben Jones
- Darren Jordan
- Tony Kemp
- Chris Langley
- Andy Hay
- Peter Larkin
- Corey Lawrie
- Jason Lee
- Zebastian Lucky Luisi
- Chris McKenna
- Colin Maskill
- Joe Mbu
- Tony Miller
- Danny Mills
- Martin Moana
- Gareth Morton
- Gavin Morgan
- Richard Newlove
- David Noble 1751-points 1976...1992 (Testimonial match 1988)
- Kevin Parkhouse
- Stuart Piper (Testimonial match 1982)
- Audley Pennant circa-1994
- Joel Penny
- Gareth Price first captain/coach in 1951 from Halifax
- Kevin Rayne
- Sam Reay
- Wayne Reittie
- Mark Roache Wing Record Try Scorer 111-tries 1985...1996
- Shad Royston
- Steve Edwards (Parramatta, Newtown)
- Anthony Seuseu
- Rikki Sheriffe
- Andy Speak
- Lynton Stott
- Clive Sullivan
- Ryan Tandy
- Latham Tawhai
- Lionel Teixido
- Jamie Thackray
- Wayne (Danny) Thornton
- Tony Tonks
- Neil Turner
- Sonny Whakarau
- Kyle Wood

== Past coaches ==
Also see Category:Doncaster R.L.F.C. coaches.

- Gareth Price 1951
- Don Robinson 1964
- Les Belshaw Sep 1966 – Sep 1968
- Tommy Smales 1978
- Alan Rhodes 1980–1983
- Clive Sullivan 1983-1984
- John Sheridan 1984–1989
- David Sampson 1990–1991
- Tony Fisher 1993–1994
- Ian Brooke 1995-97
- Colin Maskill 1998
- St. John Ellis 1999–2005
- Tony Miller 2006
- Keiran Dempsey 2007
- Gary Wilkinson 2007
- Peter Green
- John Stankevitch 2007
- Ellery Hanley 2008
- Tony Miller 2011–2012
- Paul Cooke 2012–2015
- Gary Thornton 2015–2017
- Richard Horne 2017-

== Seasons ==
=== Super League era ===
| Season | League | | | | | | | | | Play-offs | Challenge Cup | Other competitions | | Name | Tries | Name | Points |
| Season | Division | P | W | D | L | F | A | Pts | Pos | Play-offs | Challenge Cup | Other competitions | | Top try scorer | | Top point scorer | |
|---|---|---|---|---|---|---|---|---|---|---|---|---|---|---|---|---|---|
| 1996 | Division Two | 22 | 13 | 0 | 9 | 500 | 540 | 26 | 5th | | R3 | | | | | | |
| 1997 | Division Two | 20 | 3 | 1 | 16 | 247 | 668 | 7 | 10th | | R4 | | | | | | |
| 1998 | Division Two | 20 | 2 | 2 | 16 | 289 | 619 | 46 | 8th | | R3 | | | | | | |
| 1999 | Northern Ford Premiership | 28 | 4 | 1 | 23 | 473 | 911 | 9 | 18th | | R4 | | | | | | |
| 2000 | Northern Ford Premiership | 28 | 21 | 0 | 7 | 880 | 397 | 42 | 3rd | | R5 | | | | | | |
| 2001 | Northern Ford Premiership | 28 | 14 | 0 | 14 | 622 | 532 | 28 | 12th | | R5 | | | | | | |
| 2002 | Northern Ford Premiership | 27 | 16 | 1 | 10 | 741 | 603 | 33 | 6th | | QF | | | | | | |
| 2003 | National League One | 18 | 6 | 1 | 11 | 429 | 632 | 13 | 8th | | R5 | | | | | | |
| 2004 | National League One | 18 | 9 | 1 | 8 | 468 | 502 | 19 | 6th | Lost in Elimination Playoffs | R5 | | | | | | |
| 2005 | National League One | 18 | 10 | 0 | 8 | 485 | 470 | 20 | 5th | Lost in Elimination Playoffs | R5 | | | | | | |
| 2006 | National League One | 18 | 6 | 1 | 11 | 458 | 533 | 13 | 8th | | R4 | | | | | | |
| 2007 | National League One | 18 | 5 | 0 | 13 | 348 | 778 | 10 | 10th | | R3 | | | | | | |
| 2008 | National League Two | 22 | 15 | 0 | 7 | 672 | 426 | 48 | 4th | | R4 | Championship Cup | RU | | | | |
| 2009 | Championship | 20 | 1 | 0 | 19 | 257 | 955 | -1 | 11th | | R4 | | | | | | |
| 2010 | Championship 1 | 20 | 8 | 0 | 12 | 518 | 588 | 28 | 9th | | R3 | | | | | | |
| 2011 | Championship 1 | 20 | 12 | 0 | 8 | 531 | 433 | 40 | 5th | ? | R4 | | | | | | |
| 2012 | Championship 1 | 18 | 15 | 0 | 3 | 717 | 347 | 46 | 1st | Won in Final | R4 | | | | | | |
| 2013 | Championship | 26 | 12 | 1 | 13 | 593 | 594 | 43 | 6th | Lost in Elimination Playoffs | R4 | | | | | | |
| 2014 | Championship | 26 | 17 | 1 | 8 | 643 | 599 | 57 | 4th | ? | R5 | | | | | | |
| 2015 | Championship | 23 | 1 | 0 | 22 | 282 | 851 | 2 | 12th | | R4 | | | | | | |
| 2015 | Championship Shield | 30 | 2 | 0 | 28 | 401 | 1128 | 4 | 8th | | R4 | | | | | | |
| 2016 | League 1 | 21 | 14 | 0 | 7 | 683 | 526 | 28 | 4th | Lost in Semi Final | R4 | | | | | | |
| 2017 | League 1 | 22 | 10 | 3 | 9 | 593 | 492 | 23 | 6th | | R5 | | | | | | |
| 2018 | League 1 | 26 | 19 | 0 | 7 | 956 | 495 | 38 | 3rd | Lost in Semi Final | R5 | | | | | | |
| 2019 | League 1 | 20 | 12 | 0 | 8 | 564 | 309 | 24 | 4th | Lost in Preliminary Final | R6 | 1895 Cup | QF | | | | |
| 2020 | League 1 | League abandoned due to the COVID-19 pandemic | | | | | | | | | R4 | | | | | | |
| 2021 | League 1 | 17 | 9 | 3 | 5 | 472 | 392 | 21 | 5th | Lost in Promotion Final | Did not participate | | | | | | |
| 2022 | League 1 | 20 | 15 | 0 | 5 | 720 | 434 | 30 | 4th | Lost in Promotion Final | R4 | | | | | | |
| 2023 | League 1 | 18 | 14 | 0 | 4 | 602 | 352 | 28 | 3rd | Won in Promotion Final | R4 | | | | | | |
| 2024 | Championship | 26 | 12 | 1 | 13 | 498 | 619 | 25 | 8th | | R4 | 1895 Cup | GS | | | | |
| 2025 | Championship | 24 | 11 | 0 | 13 | 528 | 533 | 22 | 8th | | R2 | 1895 Cup | R1 | | | | |
| 2026 | Championship | 24 | 19 | 0 | 5 | 915 | 379 | 38 | 4th | Lost in Grand Final | R3 | 1895 Cup | QF | | | | |

== All-time statistics ==
=== Match ===
Goals: 15, Liam Harris at Post Office Road v West Wales Raiders, 15 July 2018
Tries: 6, Kane Epati v Oldham, 30 July 2006, Lee Waterman v Sharlston Rovers, 24 March 2012
Points: 38, Liam Harris at Post Office Road v West Wales Raiders, 15 July 2018

=== Season ===
Goals: 129 Johnny Woodcock 2002
Tries: 35, Lee Waterman 2012
Points: 306, Johnny Woodcock 2002

=== Career ===
Goals: 773, David Noble 1974-91
Tries: 112, Mark Roache 1984-1997
Points: 1751, David Noble 1974-91

=== Doncaster appearances ===
Career: Audley Pennant 327 (1980–97)
Season: Arthur Street 40 (1951-52)

=== Highest score ===
120 v 0 North Wales Crusaders - 9/8/2026

=== Biggest loss ===
4-90 v Widnes - 2007

=== Record crowd ===
10000 v Bradford Northern - 16/2/1952

All club statistics are courtesy of Ray Green/Rob Terrace (amendments required)

== See also ==
- Rugby Football League expansion
