= Gary Wilkinson (rugby league) =

English professional rugby league coach

Personal information
- Full name: Gary Wilkinson

Coaching information
Club
Years	Team	Gms	W	D	L	W%
2000–02	Hull Kingston Rovers	72	45	3	24	63
2006	Sheffield Eagles	32	22	0	10	69
2007	Doncaster RLFC	6	3	0	3	50
	Total	110	70	3	37	64
- Source: As of 30 June 2026

Gary Wilkinson is an English rugby league coach who was head coach of Hull Kingston Rovers, the Sheffield Eagles and subsequently in temporary charge of Doncaster.

Wilkinson had a career as a player in the amateur leagues in Hull before moving into coaching where he proved he could develop young players and produce winning teams. After a successful spell as Hull Kingston Rovers's Academy boss he took over the first team in November 2000, reaching the Northern Ford Premiership play-offs in 2001 and 2002 and the final of the 2002 Northern Rail Cup. He fell victim to changing fortunes in the Hull Kingston Rovers' boardroom and moved on to Hull F.C. as under-21s coach and had a brief spell on the backroom staff at Doncaster. In 2004 he was appointed coach of the successful GB Students' squad. In 2006 he was head coach of the Sheffield Eagles.

Wilkinson was a part-time coach at the Eagles, on weekdays he runs a pest control business in Hull. When he was appointed at the start of the 2006 season he immediately helped the Eagles by bringing in players from the Hull area and from the student game. The team took time to gel but eventually finished second in National League Two after an eleven-game unbeaten run, qualifying for the play-offs. They then beat Crusaders and Swinton to gain promotion to National League One. He resigned as the Eagles' head coach on 15 October 2006, citing personal reasons.

In April 2007 Wilkinson returned to rugby league coaching when he took temporary charge of Doncaster following the suspension of their coach Keiran Dempsey and his assistant. His first game in charge was against the Sheffield Eagles at the Don Valley Stadium and Wilkinson's team recorded a victory by 24 points to 20. In May 2007 Doncaster entered into a CVA to avoid potential liquidation and Wilkinson was told not to continue as coach.
