= David McLintock =

British academic and translator

- Born: 17 November 1930; Barnsley, England
- Died: 16 October 2003 (aged 72); London, England
- Occupation: Translator
- Awards: Austrian State Prize for Literary Translation; Schlegel-Tieck Prize

Academic background
- Education: Scarborough High School for Boys; Queen's College, Oxford

Academic work
- Discipline: Germanic Philology; Medieval German Literature
- Institutions: Mansfield College, Oxford; Wolfson College, Oxford; Royal Holloway College
- Notable students: John le Carré
- Notable works: A Handbook of Old High German Literature; Translation of works by Thomas Bernhard

David Robert McLintock (17 November 1930 – 16 October 2003) was a British academic and translator. A pre-eminent scholar of Old High German language and literature, who taught in Oxford and London, he later became a prize-winning translator, noted for helping to establish the reputation of the Austrian writer Thomas Bernhard in the English-speaking world.

== Biography ==
McLintock was born on 17 November 1930, in Barnsley. He attended Scarborough High School for Boys and won a scholarship to study at Queen's College, Oxford, gaining a First in French and German in 1952. He then obtained a Diploma in Comparative Philology under Leonard Palmer and Charles Leslie Wrenn; his chosen languages were Greek and Gothic. He went on to study in Münster with Jost Trier, and in Munich under Wilhelm Wissmann.

Returning to Oxford, McLintock became a university lecturer in Germanic philology and mediaeval German literature, attached first to Mansfield College and then to the newly founded Wolfson College.

One of McLintock's Oxford pupils was John le Carré. He also "liked to think that George Smiley's affectionate references to German studies owed something to his tutorials". In A Perfect Spy, le Carré describes his protagonist Pym's dedication to McLintock's disciplines:

By the end of his first term he was an enthusiastic student of Middle and Old High German. By the end of his second he could recite the Hildebrandslied and intone Bishop Ulfila's Gothic translation of the Bible in his college bar to the delight of his modest court. By the middle of his third he was romping in the Parnassian fields of comparative and putative philology.

In 1967, McLintock moved to London to become Reader in German at Royal Holloway College in the department headed by Ralph Tymms.

McLintock was regarded as "one of the foremost comparative Germanic philologists of his generation in Britain" and his major scholarly achievement was to complete the revision of J. Knight Bostock's A Handbook of Old High German Literature, which he undertook after the death of his colleague Kenneth King. The book remains "the most comprehensive guide to the field in any language". He was also the author of many scholarly articles on early German language and literature, with notable contributions on the Nibelungenlied and the Hildebrandslied, as well as several articles on Old High German texts in the standard reference work the Verfasserlexikon des deutschen Mittelalters.

In 1983, the University of London recognized McLintock's contribution to scholarship by awarding him the degree of Doctor of Letters (D.Lit).

In 1982, at age 51, McLintock took early retirement from university life and started afresh as a freelance translator. While he translated a number of important non-literary texts, such as Christian Meier's The Greek Discovery of Politics and Sigmund Freud's Civilisation and its Discontents, his reputation as a translator rests largely on the success of his literary translations. in 1986 he received the Austrian State Prize for Literary Translation, and he twice won the Schlegel-Tieck Prize — in 1990 for Heinrich Böll's Women in a River Landscape and in 1996 for Thomas Bernhard's Extinction and Christian Meier's Caesar. He translated many of Bernhard's works and is credited with introducing this controversial author to English readers:

It was only when David McLintock took on the translations of his later works, starting with his memoir Gathering Evidence to his last work Extinction, that Bernhard finds his voice in the English language.

McLintock's translations of Bernhard include Concrete, Woodcutters, Wittgenstein's Nephew, Extinction and the multi-volume autobiography Gathering Evidence. He died on 16 October 2003, aged 72, in London. The University of Oxford offers three prizes and grants in the area of Germanic Philology in his memory.

== Publications ==
=== Books ===
- Bostock, J. Knight (1976). King, K. C.; McLintock, D. R. (eds.). A Handbook on Old High German Literature (2nd ed.). Oxford: Oxford University. ISBN 0-19-815392-9.

=== Articles (selective) ===
- McLintock, D.R. (July 1957). "The Negatives of the Wessobrunn Prayer". The Modern Language Review. 52 (3): 397–398. doi:10.2307/3719491. JSTOR 3719491.
- ——— (1966). "The Language of the Hildebrandslied". Oxford German Studies. 1: 1–9. doi:10.1179/ogs.1966.1.1.1.
- ——— (November 1972). "'To Forget' in Germanic". Transactions of the Philological Society. 71 (1): 79–93. doi:10.1111/j.1467-968X.1972.tb01150.x.
- ——— (July 1976). "Metre and Rhythm in the Hildebrandslied". The Modern Language Review. 71 (3): 565–576. doi:10.2307/3725749. JSTOR 3725749.
- ——— (July 1976). "The Politics of the Hildebrandslied". New German Studies. 2 (3): 61–81.
- ——— (1980). "Tense and narrative perspective in two works by Thomas Bernhard". Oxford German Studies. 11: 1–26. doi:10.1179/ogs.1980.11.1.1.

=== Translations ===
- Bernhard, Thomas (1984). Concrete [Beton]. Translated by David McLintock. London: J.M.Dent. ISBN 978-0460046107.
- ——— (1985). Gathering Evidence. Translated by David McLintock. New York: Knopf. ISBN 9780394547077.
- ——— (1987). Woodcutters [Holzfällen: Eine Erregung]. Translated by David McLintock. New York: Knopf. ISBN 9780394551524.
- ——— (1989). Wittgenstein's Nephew [Wittgensteins Neffe]. Translated by David McLintock. New York: Knopf. ISBN 039456376X.
- ——— (1995). Extinction [Auslöschung]. Translated by David McLintock. New York: Knopf. ISBN 9780394572536.
- Böll, Heinrich (1989). Women in a river landscape [Frauen vor Flusslandschaft]. Translated by David McLintock. London: Secker & Warburg. ISBN 9780436054600.
- Freud, Sigmund (2002). Civilization and Its Discontents [Das Unbehagen in der Kultur]. Translated by David McLintock. London: Penguin. ISBN 978-0141018997.
- ——— (2003). The Uncanny [Das Unheimliche]. Translated by David McLintock. London: Penguin. ISBN 978-0141182377.
- Meier, Christian (1990). The Greek Discovery of Politics [Entstehung des Politischen bei den Griechen]. Translated by David McLintock. Cambridge, MA: Harvard University Press. ISBN 0-674-36232-2.
- ——— (1996). Caesar : A Biography [Caesar]. Translated by David McLintock. London: Basic Books. ISBN 9780465008940.
- Warnke, Martin (1993). The Court Artist: On the Ancestry of the Modern Artist [Hofkünstler. Zur Vorgeschichte des modernen Künstlers]. Translated by David McLintock. Cambridge; New York: Cambridge University Press. ISBN 0521363756.
- ——— (1994). Political Landscape: The Art History of Nature [Politische Landschaft: Zur Kunstgeschichte der Natur]. Translated by David McLintock. London: Reaktion. ISBN 9780948462634.
