= Barbara Jane Harrison =

British flight attendant

Barbara Jane Harrison GC
- Barbara Jane Harrison, GC
- Born: Barbara Jane Harrison; 24 May 1945; Bradford, West Riding of Yorkshire, England
- Died: 8 April 1968 (aged 22); London Heathrow Airport
- Cause of death: Asphyxia from fire (BOAC Flight 712)
- Resting place: Fulford Cemetery, York
- Other names: Jane Harrison
- Occupation: Flight attendant
- Employer: British Overseas Airways Corporation
- Known for: BOAC Flight 712
- Parent(s): Alan Harrison, Lena Harrison (née Adlard)
- Awards: George Cross (posthumous)

Barbara Jane Harrison GC (24 May 1945 – 8 April 1968), known as Jane Harrison, was a British flight attendant who was posthumously awarded the George Cross for her role in the evacuation of BOAC Flight 712. She is one of four women to have been awarded the George Cross for heroism, and the only woman awarded the medal on that basis for gallantry in peacetime. The other three female George Cross recipients served with the Special Operations Executive in occupied France during the Second World War.

== Early life ==
Harrison was born on 24 May 1945 at the family home in Kingsdale Crescent, Bradford, West Riding of Yorkshire to Lena and Alan Harrison. She was their second child, another daughter, Susan Elizabeth, having been born in 1941. Harrison attended Greystones School, Bradford. The family later moved to Scarborough, where Harrison attended Newby County Primary School. In 1955 her mother died. She passed her 11-plus and attended Scarborough Girls' High School. In 1961, her father moved to Doncaster. Harrison stayed on at Scarborough to complete her O levels before joining her father in the summer of 1961. She then attended Doncaster High School until Easter, 1962.^{[A]}

== Career ==
After leaving school, Harrison worked at Martins Bank from 1962 until 1964, then took a job as a nanny for a Swiss farmer in the Canton of Neuchâtel in order to improve her French. She later took another job as a nanny in San Francisco. While in San Francisco she applied for a job as a flight attendant with British Overseas Airways Corporation (BOAC), and she joined BOAC in May 1966.

After completing her training, Harrison was assigned work on board BOAC's Boeing 707 fleet. She moved to Emperor's Gate, Kensington, London, where she shared a flat with other BOAC flight attendants, and purchased a Ford Anglia car for use in getting to work at Heathrow Airport. She also joined Universal Aunts, which provided staff to do odd jobs; one of her assignments was babysitting Jason Connery, son of actor Sean Connery.^{[A]} While she enjoyed her job, long-haul flights with their several stopovers were exhausting, and she had told a friend she was considering quitting BOAC.^{[A]}

On 8 April 1968 Harrison was rostered at her own request to work BOAC Flight 712 Whiskey Echo long-haul to Sydney, Australia, via Zurich, Tel Aviv, Tehran, Bombay (now Mumbai), Singapore and Perth. She told a colleague that she had been invited to a wedding in Sydney, but it is possible that she wanted to see a Qantas pilot she had met some months before.^{[A]}

== Death ==
On 8 April 1968, Harrison (aged 22) was a flight attendant aboard BOAC Flight 712 when it left Heathrow Airport at 16.27 BST, bound indirectly for Sydney. Her George Cross citation recites what happened almost immediately after takeoff:

No. 2 engine of B.O.A.C. Boeing 707 G-ARWE caught fire and subsequently fell from the aircraft, leaving a fierce fire burning at No. 2 engine position. About two and a half minutes later the aircraft made an emergency landing at the airport and the fire on the port wing intensified. Miss Harrison was one of the stewardesses in this aircraft. The duties assigned to her in an emergency were to help the steward at the aft station to open the appropriate rear door, inflate the escape chute, and assist passengers at the rear of the aircraft to leave in an orderly manner. When the aircraft landed, Miss Harrison and the steward concerned opened the rear galley door and inflated the chute, which unfortunately became twisted on the way down so that the steward had to climb down it to straighten it before it could be used. Once out of the aircraft he was unable to return; hence Miss Harrison was left alone to the task of shepherding passengers to the rear door and helping them out of the aircraft. She encouraged some passengers to jump from the machine and pushed out others.

According to witnesses, after the escape chute had been burnt away Harrison continued to force passengers to safety by pushing them out of the door, even as "flames and smoke [were] licking around her face".^{[A]} She then seemed to be preparing to jump but instead turned back inside;^{[A]} there was another explosion and she was not seen alive again.^{[A]} Her body was found with four others near the rear door;^{[A]} all had died from asphyxia.^{[A]}

Anthony Crosland (President of the Board of Trade and the minister responsible for civil aviation) later wrote of Harrison's "lonely and courageous action" and "devotion to duty, in the highest traditions of her calling".^{[A]}

In August 1969 Harrison became the only woman to receive the George Cross in peacetime, and its youngest female recipient. The medal was presented to her father in 1969 and, as of 2019, is at British Airways' Speedbird Centre, which is dedicated to the history of the crew and story of British Airways.

== Memorials ==
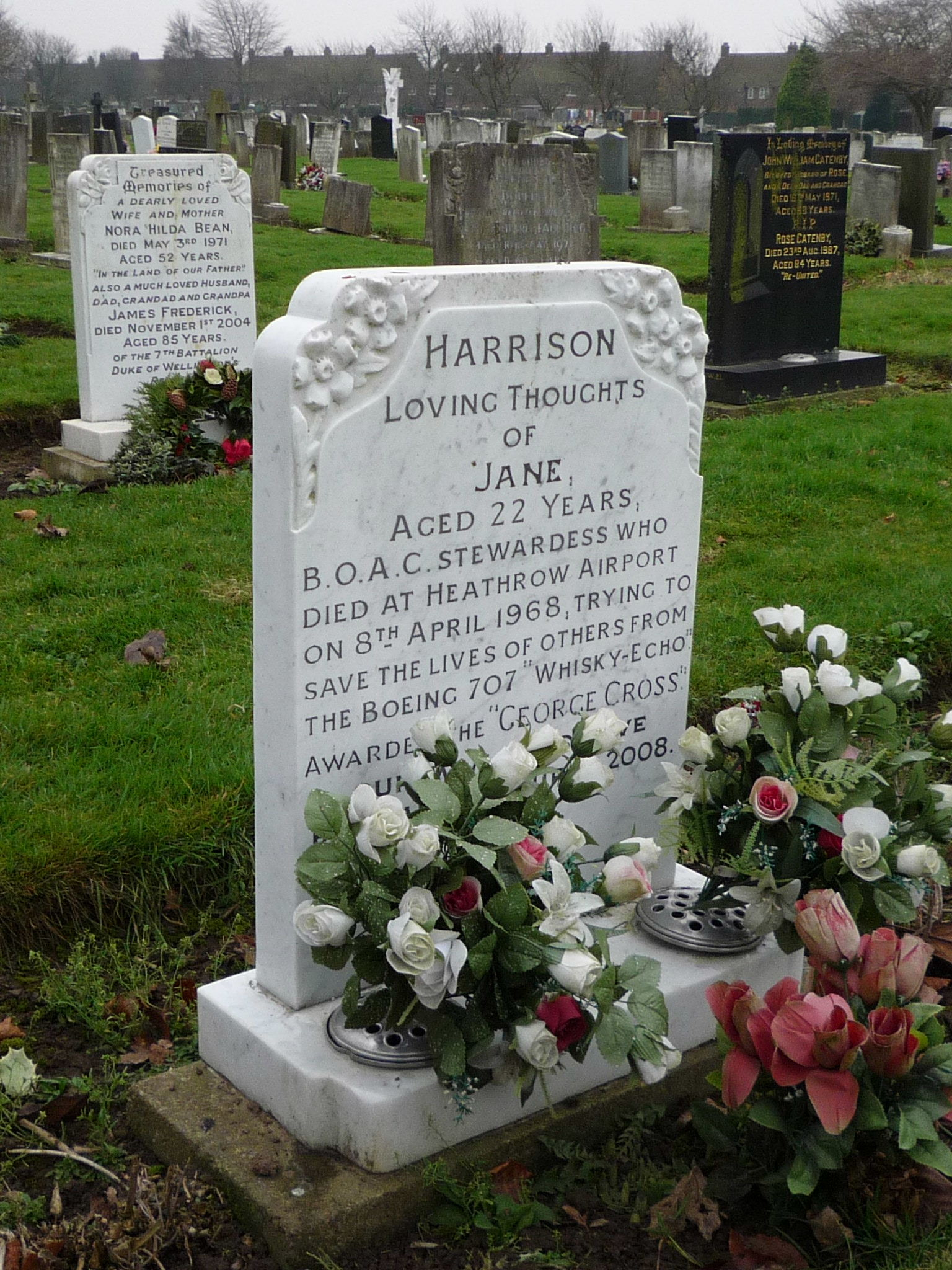
Harrison's gravestone, Fulford Cemetery, York

The "Barbara Jane Harrison, GC, Memorial Fund", set up in October 1969, raised £1,500 towards purchase of a computer for the National Hospital for Neurology and Neurosurgery, London, for use by the muscular dystrophy laboratories for research into the disease.^{[A]}

A plaque in memory of Harrison was unveiled on 23 October 1970.^{[A]} The Barbara Harrison Prize was established in 1968 by the Royal Air Force Institute of Aviation Medicine. It is awarded to the best student on a Diploma in Aviation Medicine course whose first language is not English. The prize is now under the remit of the Department of Aviation Medicine at King's College, London. Since 2010, the Barbara Harrison Memorial Prize is awarded to the student of the Diploma in Aviation Medicine Course "who has demonstrated commitment to others and determination to succeed through the course and in gaining the Diploma".

Also in 1970, a plaque memorial was unveiled in St George's Interdenominational Chapel in Heathrow Airport dedicated to Harrison. A plaque remembering Harrison is on the churchyard wall of St Laurence's Church, Scalby, Scarborough. She is also commemorated with a memorial display in Bradford City Hall.

== See also ==
- Neerja Bhanot
- Frankie Housley

== Footnotes ==
=== Sources and further reading ===
- | A. | Susan Ottaway, Fire Over Heathrow. The Tragedy of Flight 712. |
- | B. | O'Brien, Tim (June 2008). "The Last Flight of Whiskey Echo". Aeroplane. 36, Number 6 (422): 30–35. ISSN 0143-7240. |
