= Greg Burns (rugby league) =

English rugby league player

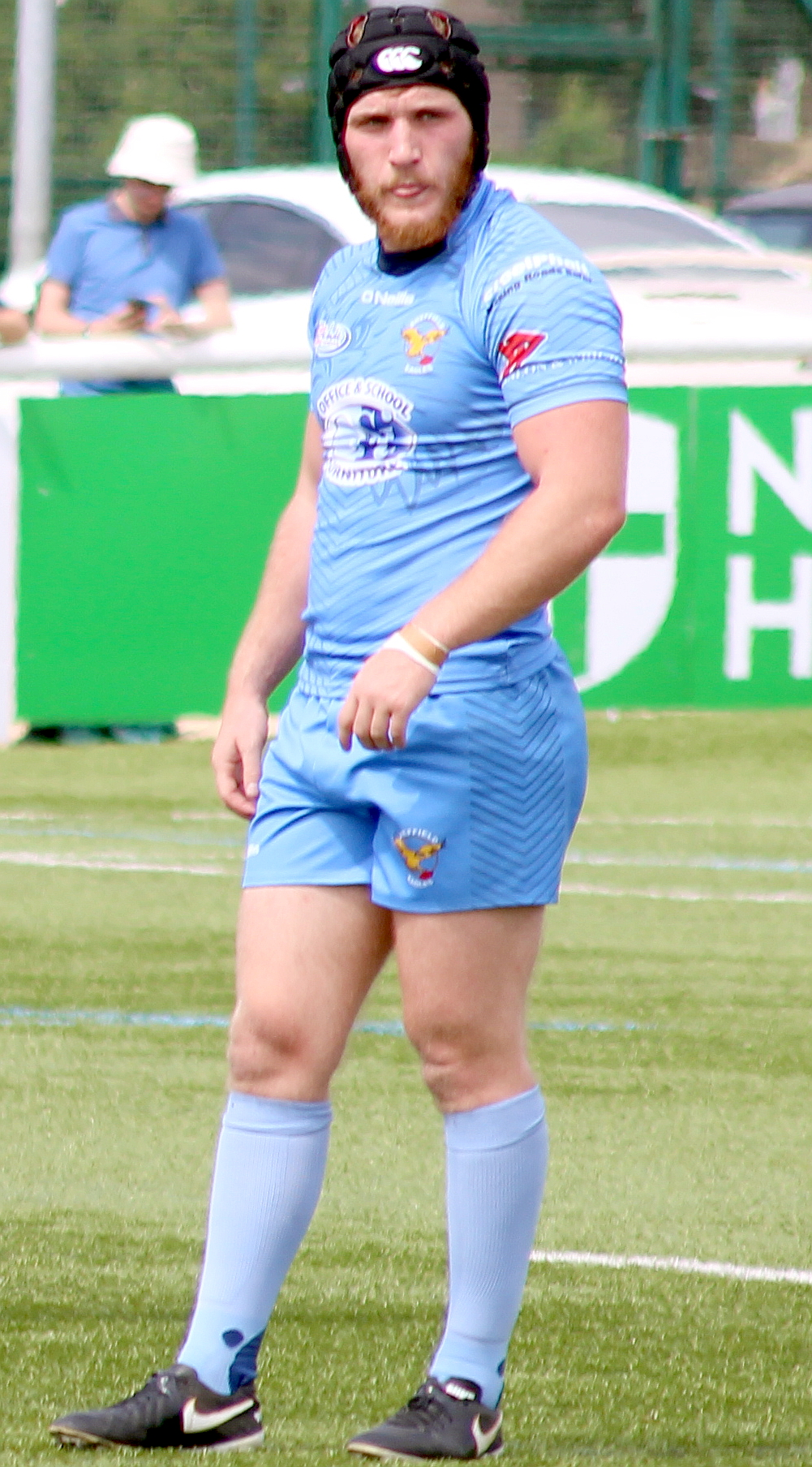

Personal information
- Full name: Gregory Burns
- Born: 5 March 1995 (age 31) Yorkshire, England
- Height: 5 ft 8 in (1.72 m)
- Weight: 13 st 1 lb (83 kg)

Playing information
- Position: Hooker
Club
Years	Team	Pld	T	G	FG	P
2015–21	Sheffield Eagles	91	7	0	0	28
2022–	Doncaster	19	4	0	0	16
	Total	110	11	0	0	44
- Source: As of 6 September 2026

Gregory Burns (born 5 March 1995) is a professional rugby league footballer who plays as a hooker for Doncaster in the Betfred Championship.

Burns is a graduate of the Eagles Academy system and has played in Sheffield's reserve team. He helped the Eagles to win the inaugural 1895 Cup as they defeated Widnes Vikings 36–18 in the final.

His brothers Jonathan and Paddy came through the Eagles' youth system. Paddy signed a professional contract with them in 2018 and Jonathan plays with the Hemel Stags.

On 14 April 2017, Greg scored his first professional try for the Eagles. It was against Rochdale Hornets in an 18–42 victory.

In November 2021, Burns signed for Doncaster on a one-year deal.
