= Loui McConnell =

English rugby league footballer

Personal information
- Full name: Louis McConnell
- Born: 21 November 1999 (age 26) Leeds, West Yorkshire, England
- Height: 5 ft 10 in (1.79 m)
- Weight: 15 st 13 lb (101 kg)

Playing information
- Position: Loose forward
Club
Years	Team	Pld	T	G	FG	P
2020	Leeds Rhinos	1	0	0	0	0
2020–22	Featherstone Rovers	15	0	0	0	0
2021(loan)	→ Hunslet	0	0	0	0	0
2021(loan)	→ Castleford Tigers	0	0	0	0	0
2022(loan)	→ Doncaster RLFC	20	3	0	0	12
2023–26	Doncaster RLFC	74	10	0	0	40
	Total	110	13	0	0	52
- Source: As of 21 October 2026

Loui McConnell (born 21 November 1999) is a professional rugby league footballer who last played as a loose forward for Doncaster RLFC in the Betfred Championship.

== Background ==
Son of Kirsty Green and Lee McConnell, McConnell lived a fun filled childhood, and always knew his dream was to be a rugby star. McConnell played his amateur rugby league with the Oulton Vikings and Methley Warriors. At 15 Loui was picked up by the Leeds Rhinos where he spent 5 years before moving on to Featherstone Rovers. After a couple of years of being a Flat Capper, McConnell moved onto pastures green and signed with the mighty Doncaster RLFC.

== Career ==
=== Leeds Rhinos ===
McConnell made his Super League debut in round 14 of the 2020 Super League season for Leeds against the Catalans Dragons.

=== Featherstone Rovers ===
On 12 Jul 2020 it was announced that McConnell had signed for Featherstone Rovers.

=== Castleford Tigers (loan) ===
On 31 Jul 2021 it was reported that he had signed for the Castleford Tigers in the Super League on a short-term loan.

=== Doncaster RLFC ===
On 21 October 2026 it was announced that he was amongst 6 players released by Doncaster RLFC
