= Craig Farrell (rugby league) =

English rugby league footballer

Personal information
- Born: 8 October 1981 (age 44) Widnes, Cheshire, England
- Height: 5 ft 11 in (180 cm)
- Weight: 15 st 2 lb (96 kg)

Playing information
- Position: Centre, Wing, Second-row, Loose forward
Club
Years	Team	Pld	T	G	FG	P
2000–01	Hull FC	4	0	0	0	0
2002–04	Hull Kingston Rovers	57	13	0	0	52
2004	York City Knights	10	7	0	0	28
2005	Doncaster	29	12	0	0	48
2006	York City Knights	14	4	0	0	16
2007–08	Batley Bulldogs	28	2	1	1	11
	Total	142	38	1	1	155

Craig Farrell (born 8 October 1981) is an English former professional rugby league player who played in the 2000s. He played at club level for Hull FC in 2000's Super League V and 2001's Super League VI, Hull Kingston Rovers, York City Knights, Doncaster, and Batley Bulldogs in National League One, as a wing, centre or second-row, loose forward. He also played representative rugby for Great Britain Universities.

== Background ==
Farrell was born in Widnes, Cheshire, England, and he was a pupil at Graham School, Scarborough, North Yorkshire. He later attended York St. John University.

== Career ==
In 2006, he began a career as a PE teacher, based at Graham School Specialist Science & Arts College, in Scarborough, North Yorkshire, in conjunction with his rugby league career. Farrell retired from professional rugby league at the end of 2008, at the age of 27. In 2019 he began teaching at St. Augustine's Catholic School, also in Scarborough.
