= John David Kennedy =

John D Kennedy
- Born: England, UK
- Known for: Macropolyhedral and megaloborane chemistry
- Awards: J E Purkyne Medal, Academy of Sciences of the Czech Republic, 1993; Royal Society of Chemistry 1999 Silver Medal for Main-Group Chemistry, 2000
- Scientific career
- Fields: Boron Chemistry
- Workplaces: University of Leeds

John David Kennedy (born 1943) is a chemist and emeritus professor of inorganic chemistry at the University of Leeds. He works in the area of polyhedral borane chemistry.

== Biography ==
John D Kennedy was born in 1943. He was educated at Scarborough High School for Boys between 1954 and 1962 and received his BSc from University College London in 1965. After receiving his PhD from University College London in 1968, he was a research associate at State University of New York at Albany until 1971. He then returned to University College London as a research fellow. From 1971 to 1972 he served as a temporary lecturer in organic chemistry at King's College London, and as a research associate at Sir John Cass School of Science and Technology, City of London Polytechnic from 1972 to 1975.

In 1975 Kennedy moved to the University of Leeds where he was successively research fellow, senior lecturer and reader in inorganic chemistry. In 2000 he was appointed professor of inorganic chemistry at Leeds. He retired in 2008 with the title emeritus professor.

In 1993 he received the J E Purkyne Medal from the Academy of Sciences of the Czech Republic. In 1994 he made a successful ascent of Kilimanjaro. In 2000 he was awarded the Royal Society of Chemistry 1999 Silver Medal for Main-Group Chemistry.

== Research interests ==
Kennedy has been at the forefront of macropolyhedral megaloborane chemistry for many years. His research interests are diverse, involving many different species of heteroboranes, metallaboranes, metallaheteroboranes and carboranes. A major theme is the exploration of the spectrum of intimacy between clusters: from discrete polyhedra connected by rigid organic tethers, to giant megaloboranes, generated through the seamless fusion of multiple clusters. The unusual cluster-geometries and hydride-like properties of the compounds synthesized in the Kennedy group make them ideal candidates for the investigation of unconventional intermolecular interactions, such as the dihydrogen bond. The Kennedy group also focuses on the novel structures obtained through the introduction of metals and heteroatoms into polyhedral boranes: these "disobedient skeletons", some described as "iso-nido" or "iso-closo", do not follow Wade's rules. These boron clusters may act as flexible scaffolds for catalytically active metals. Professor Kennedy is a leading authority on the reaction chemistry of metallaboranes. He has also been involved with the synthesis of relatively inert monocarborane derivatives as non-coordinating counter-anions for many industrial applications.

== Awards ==
Kennedy has published 383 papers. According to "Web of Science" he has an h-index of 40. Such a high h-index is exceptional, especially for a chemist working in an unfashionable field.

== Research keywords ==
Borane, Carborane, Polyhedra, Megaloborane, Heteroborane, intermolecular interaction, Supramolecular chemistry, molecular self-assembly, Least coordinating anion
