= J. A. F. Rook =

British chemist

John Allan Fynes Rook CBE FRSE FIB FRIC (1926–1987) was a 20th-century British chemist connected to the British dairy industry. He was President of the British Society of Animal Production 1982/83.

== Life ==
He was born on 1 May 1926 the son of Edward Fynes Rook, near Scarborough in North Yorkshire. He was educated at Scarborough High School for Boys, then studied Chemistry at the University of Wales graduating BSc in 1947. He then won an Agricultural Research Council scholarship to do further postgraduate studies.

In 1965 he was appointed Professor of Agricultural Chemistry at Leeds University. From 1970 he was Director of the Hannah Dairy Research Institute in Ayr and then Professor of Animal Nutrition at Glasgow University.

In 1973 he was elected a Fellow of the Royal Society of Edinburgh. His proposers were D G Armstrong, Sir Kenneth Blaxter, Sir David Cuthbertson, J A B Smith, G A Garton and C F Mills.

He retired to his home county of Yorkshire in 1981 but had a further 5 years as a visiting professor to Wye College in London before full retiral in 1986 due to ill-health. He died at Rathmell in Yorkshire on 6 January 1987. He is buried in the parish churchyard of Ribblesdale.

== Family ==
In 1952 he married Marion Horsburgh Millar.

== Publications ==
- The Cow and the Chemist (1967)
- Silage for Milk Production (1982)
- Nutritional Physiology of Farm Animals (1983)

He edited the Journal of Animal Production from 1976 to 1984.
