= James A. Herrick =

American academic (1954–2024)

- Born: October 6, 1954
- Died: May 24, 2024 (aged 69)
- Occupations: Academic; professor
- Title: Guy Vanderjagt Professor of Communication

Academic background
- Education: California State University, Fresno (B.A.); University of California, Davis (M.A.); University of Wisconsin–Madison (Ph.D.)

James A. Herrick (October 6, 1954 – May 24, 2024) was an American academic. He was the Guy Vanderjagt Professor of Communication and former communication chair at Hope College.

Herrick's research interests included rhetoric and argumentation, new religious movements, technology and spirituality, and the discourse of futurism. His early books are guides to the discipline of scholarly argumentation that discuss both traditional rhetorical techniques and contemporary applications for students and academics. He has written extensively on the history of rhetoric, from the theories of the ancient Greeks to modern Western thought, and more specifically on the revolutionary rhetorical practices of the seventeenth- and eighteenth-century English Deists.

Herrick's research also deals with the birth of “synthesized” religions that differ from traditional Christian doctrine. He has worked on the intersection of science and religion, and particularly on the new forms of spirituality that have risen in an increasingly technological age. Most recently, he collaborated with Michael Hyde to co-edit After the Genome: A Language for our Biotechnological Future (2013), an award-winning volume of essays that examines the ways in which language and rhetoric inform people's understanding of biotechnology.

== Early life and education ==
Herrick was raised in a household in which argument—intellectual debate, rather than heated dispute—was highly valued. He cited this upbringing as the source of his interest in rhetoric.
He completed a BA (Magna cum laude) at Cal State Fresno (1976) a MA from UC Davis (1979), and a PhD at University of Wisconsin–Madison (1984).

== Career ==
Herrick taught at Hope College from 1984 until his retirement in 2020. His courses included Analytic Skills in Communication, Rhetoric and Public Culture, Biotechnology and Human Enhancement, and Rhetorical and Communication Theory. He also taught at LCC International University in Klaipeda, Lithuania during the spring semester of 2004.

== Religious beliefs and academic philosophy ==
Herrick's research interests included the relationship between Christianity and rhetoric, and the intersection of spirituality and public discourse. He viewed argumentation as the basis of Christian culture; this philosophy forms the core of his teaching and scholarship.

Herrick viewed rhetoric as "architechtonic".

- organizes and structures other arts and disciplines
- it is a kind of master discipline that controls all others
- says that if rhetoric is the study of how we organize and use language effectively, then it is also a study of how we organize our thinking on various subjects, that is, all ideas are packaged rhetorically

Herrick wanted everyone to recognize "the pervasiveness of persuasiveness" and defined rhetoric as "the systematic study and intentional practice of effective symbolic expression".

He stated that "rhetoric is the art of employing symbols effectively," and that 'effective' means achieving the purpose of the symbol-user. The categories that this effectiveness can be judged include persuasion, clarity, beauty, and mutual understanding.

== Death ==
Herrick died on May 24, 2024, at the age of 69, as a result of Parkinson's disease.

== Critical reception ==
Herrick's scholarly output has met with much critical appreciation in the academic community. Of Herrick's 1997 book, The Radical Rhetoric of the English Deists, Lester C. Olson of the University of Pittsburgh wrote, “It is...an important contribution to eighteenth-century studies and scholarship on the history of Britain.” James W. Sire called 2003's The Making of the New Spirituality “[a] lucid intellectual history with important implications for navigating the religious currents of our day.”

== Awards and acknowledgment ==
- Wisconsin Alumni Research Foundation Fellow, May 1982.
- Communication Arts Teaching Award for Graduate Students, 1982.
- University of Wisconsin Graduate Foreign Travel Award, 1982.
- Excellence in Teaching Award, University of Wisconsin, April 1984. (Five such awards presented each year to teaching assistants.)
- Lilly Scholar, October 1993.
- Nominated by Hope College for Council for the Support and Advancement of Education (CASE), Michigan Professor of the Year Award, 1997.
- John and Ruth Reed Faculty Achievement Award, Hope College, January 2007.
- Favorite Faculty Award, Hope College, student body vote, October 2007.
- Selected for inclusion in Religionsource, international media guide to scholars in religion, American Academy of Religion, 2008.
- Elected Senior Fellow of truthXchange, San Diego–based Christian organization monitoring new religious movements, January 2014.

== Books ==
- Critical Thinking: The Analysis of Arguments. Gorsuch Scarisbrick. 1990. ISBN 9780897873420.
- Argumentation: Understanding and Shaping Arguments. Allyn & Bacon. 1995.
- Herrick, James A. (1997). The Radical Rhetoric of the English Deists: The Discourse Of Skepticism, 1680-1750. University of South Carolina Press. ISBN 978-1-57003-166-3.
- The History and Theory of Rhetoric: An Introduction. Allyn & Bacon. 1990.
- Herrick, James A. (2003). The Making of the New Spirituality: The Eclipse of the Western Religious Tradition. InterVarsity Press. ISBN 978-0-8308-3279-8.
- Scientific Mythologies: How Science and Science Fiction Forge New Religious Beliefs. InterVarsity Press. 2008.
- After the Genome: A Language for our Biotechnology Future. Baylor University Press. 2013., co-edited with Michael Hyde
- The Religion of Posthumanity, in development

== Articles ==
- “Basketball, Economics, and Christianity in a New Europe.” Cresset, 2004.
- “Antecedents of the New Age Movement,” Areopagus Journal, Summer 2006.
- “Science Fiction’s Brave New World,” cover story, Christianity Today, February 2009.
