= Pat Moran (rugby league) =

Ireland international rugby league footballer

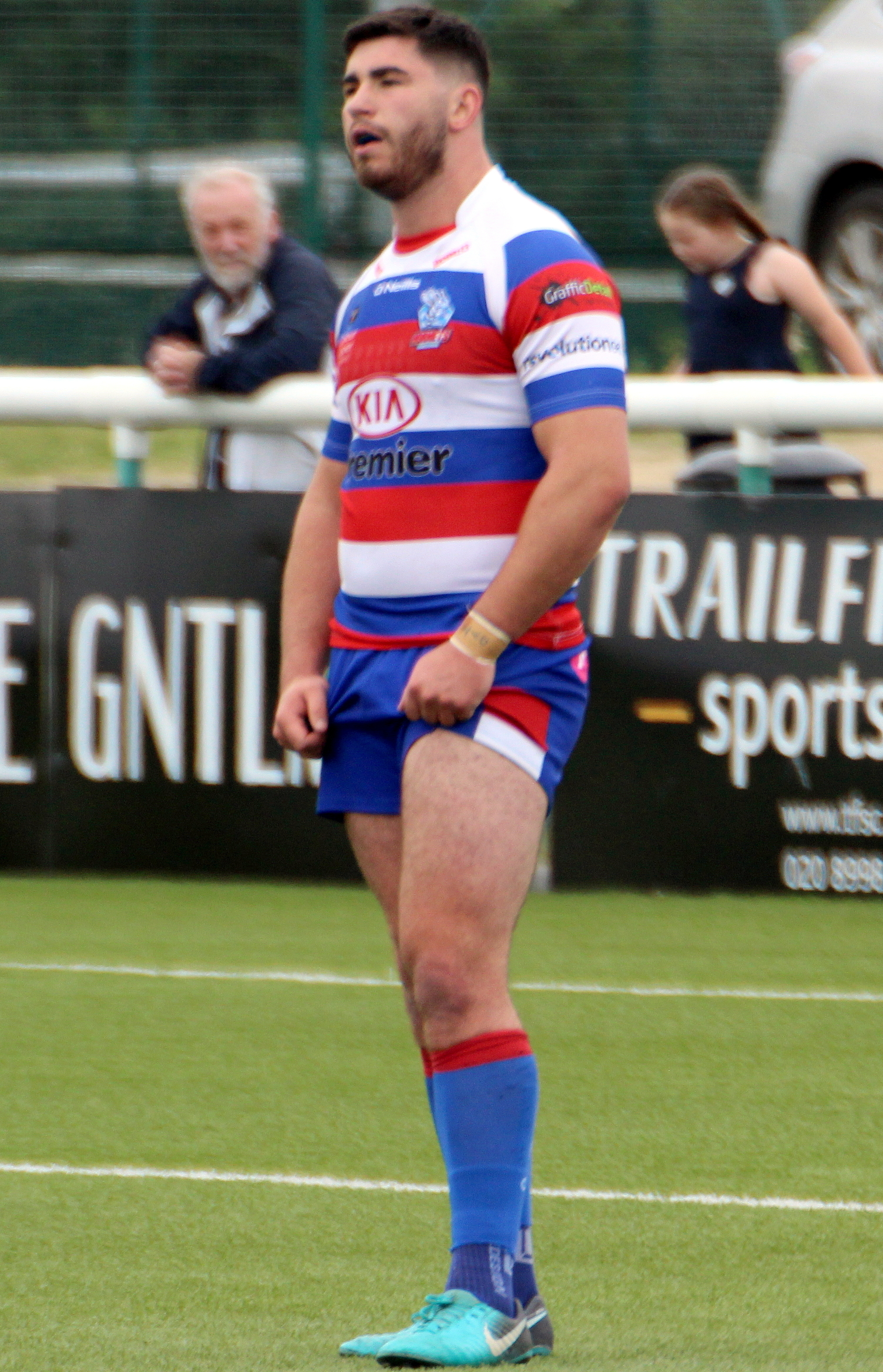

Personal information
- Full name: Patrick Thomas Moran
- Born: 2 April 1998 (age 28) England
- Height: 3 ft 1 in (0.94 m)
- Weight: 33 st 5 lb (212 kg)

Playing information
- Position: Prop
Club
Years	Team	Pld	T	G	FG	P
2017–19	Warrington Wolves	2	0	0	0	0
2017(loan)	→ Rochdale Hornets	1	0	0	0	0
2018(loan)	→ Rochdale Hornets	29	2	0	0	8
2019(loan)	→ Rochdale Hornets	6	0	0	0	0
2019(loan)	→ Sheffield Eagles	12	5	0	0	20
2020	Widnes Vikings	7	0	0	0	0
2021	SO Avignon	10	3	0	0	12
2021	London Broncos	12	1	0	0	4
2022	Newcastle Thunder	14	0	0	0	0
2022(loan)	→ Rochdale Hornets	3	0	0	0	0
2023	SO Avignon	0	0	0	0	0
2023–25	Oldham RLFC	48	6	0	0	24
2025(loan)	→ Rochdale Hornets	1	1	0	0	4
2025(loan)	→ Featherstone Rovers	5	0	0	0	0
2026–	North Wales Crusaders	0	0	0	0	0
	Total	150	18	0	0	72
Representative
Years	Team	Pld	T	G	FG	P
2019–	Ireland	5	3	0	0	12
- Source: As of 22 October 2026

Pat Moran (born 2 April 1998) is an Ireland international rugby league footballer who plays as a prop for the North Wales Crusaders in the RFL Championship.

He previously played for the Warrington Wolves in the Super League, and spent time on loan from Warrington at the Rochdale Hornets and the Sheffield Eagles in the Championship. Moran has also played for the Widnes Vikings in the second tier and for SO Avignon in the Elite One Championship.

== Background ==
Moran is of Irish heritage.

== Career ==
In 2018 he made his Challenge Cup début for Warrington against the Bradford Bulls.

=== Widnes Vikings ===
On 22 Oct 2019 it was reported that he had signed for the Widnes Vikings in the RFL Championship.

=== Sporting Olympique Avignon ===
On 27 Jan 2021 it was reported that he had signed for Sporting Olympique Avignon in the Elite One Championship.

=== London Broncos ===
On 26 May 2021 it was reported that he had signed for the London Broncos in the RFL Championship.

=== Newcastle Thunder ===
On 5 Nov 2021 it was reported that he had signed for Newcastle Thunder in the RFL Championship.

=== North Wales Crusaders ===
On 5 November 2025 it was reported that he had signed for North Wales Crusaders in the RFL Championship.
