= Humphrey Razzall =

Leonard Humphrey Razzall, known as Humphrey Razzall (13 November 1912 – 26 October 1999), was a British Liberal Party politician and solicitor.

== Background ==
He was a son of Horace Razzall, a Scarborough teacher, and Sarah Thompson, and was educated at Scarborough High School. He married Muriel Knowles in 1936, and had two sons with her. Muriel died in 1968. In 1975, he married Mary Elmore Bland.

== Professional career ==
Razzall was admitted as a solicitor in 1935, and founded the firm Humphrey Razzall & Co. in 1938. He served in the Royal Marines from 1941 to 1946, reaching the rank of staff captain. He became an examiner in the High Court practice and procedure for solicitors final examination, and was the Master of the Supreme Court (Taxing) from 1954 to 1981.

== Political career ==
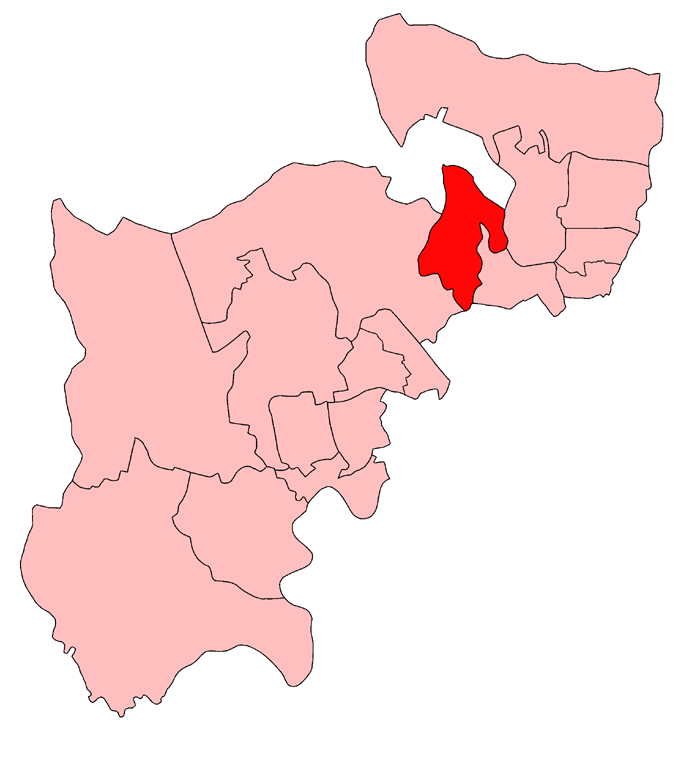
Finchley in Middlesex for 1939

He was selected as the Liberal Party's prospective parliamentary candidate for Finchley for a general election expected to take place in the autumn of 1939. Although it was a safe Conservative seat, the Liberals had come second in 1935 so it was a promising seat. However, due to the outbreak of war, Razzall never got to fight the seat but did continue with the duties of a prospective candidate, attending meetings while on leave

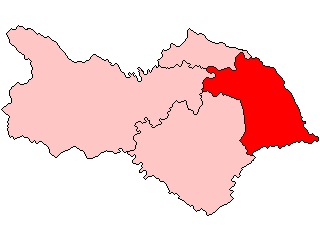
Scarborough & Whitby in North Yorkshire for 1945

By the time Winston Churchill called a general election in 1945, Razzall had moved from being Liberal candidate for Finchley to be adopted as Liberal candidate for his home town seat of Scarborough and Whitby. This was a better prospect for the Liberals, who had finished a strong second in 1935; however, the national swing to the Labour Party prevented the Liberal Party from gaining the seat.

General Election 1945: Scarborough & Whitby Electorate 59,001
Party	Candidate	Votes	%	±%
Conservative	Alexander Cadwallader Mainwaring Spearman	20,786	50.9	
Liberal	Capt. Leonard Humphrey Razzall	10,739	26.3	
Labour	Fl-Lt. DH Curry	9,289	22.8	
Majority		10,047	24.6	
Turnout			69.2	
Conservative hold		Swing		

He did not stand for parliament again.

== Publications ==
- A Man of Law’s Tale (1982)
- Law, love and laughter (1984)

== Tim Razzall ==
One of his sons, Tim Razzall, is a prominent Liberal Democrat and a member of the House of Lords.
