= St Augustine's Catholic School =

Secondary school in North Yorkshire, England

Coordinates: 54.2731°N 0.4284°W

Location
- Sandybed Lane; Stepney Hill; Scarborough; North Yorkshire, YO12 5LH; England

Information
- Type: Academy
- Religious affiliation: Roman Catholic
- Local authority: North Yorkshire Council
- Trust: St Cuthbert's Catholic Academy Trust
- Department for Education URN: 147212 Tables
- Ofsted: Reports
- Head of School: Rosa Flanagan
- Gender: Co-educational
- Age: 11 to 16
- Website: http://sasyorks.org

St Augustine's Catholic School is a co-educational secondary school located in Scarborough, North Yorkshire, England. The school is under the jurisdiction of the Roman Catholic Diocese of Middlesbrough.

Previously a voluntary aided school administered by North Yorkshire County Council, St Augustine's is part of the St Cuthbert's Roman Catholic Academy Trust

St Augustine's Catholic School offers GCSEs and Cambridge Nationals as programmes of study for pupils.
