= Titus Gwaze =

Zimbabwean rugby league footballer (born 1999)

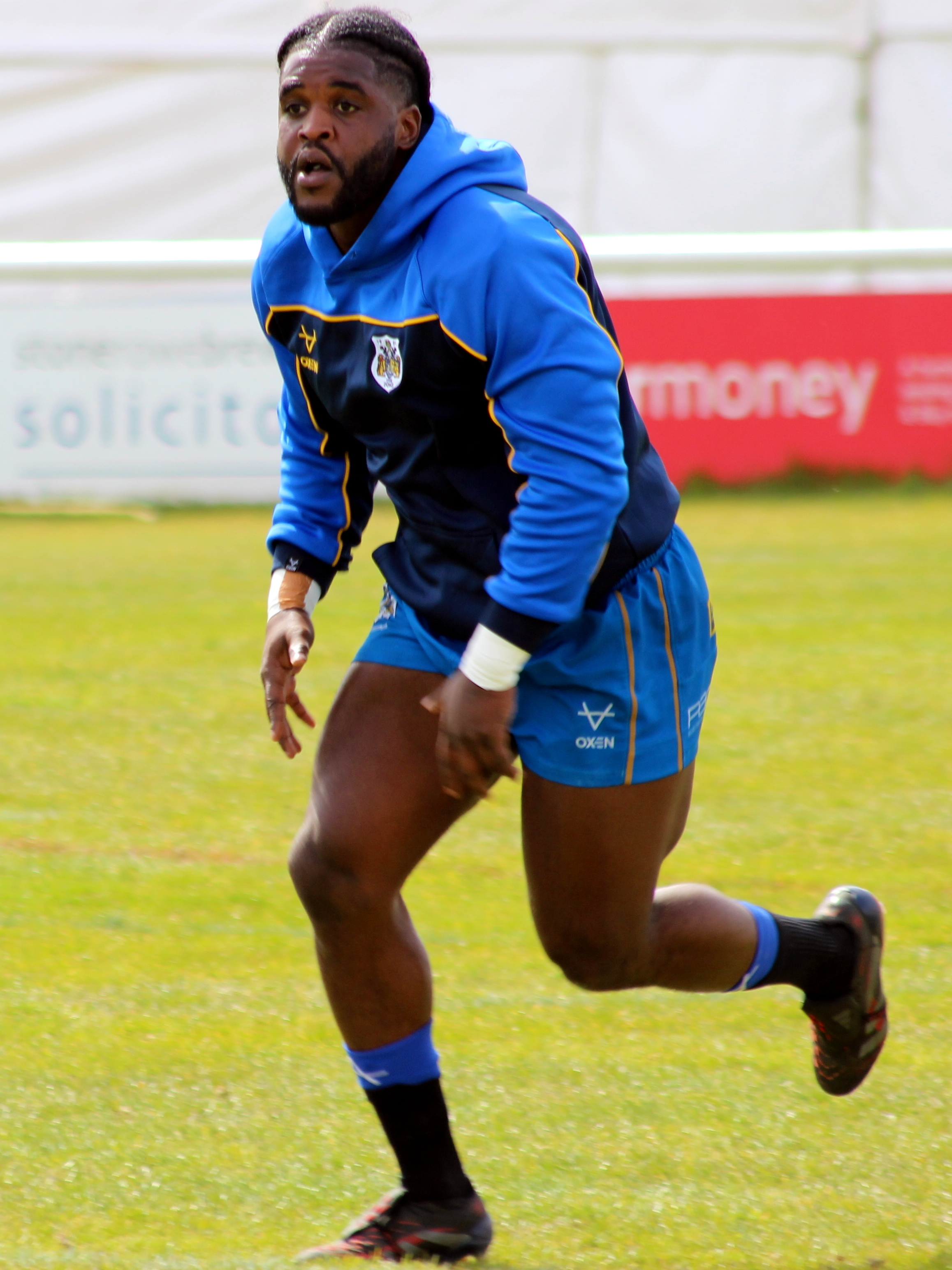

Personal information
- Full name: Titus Tendai Gwaze
- Born: 8 June 1999 (age 26) Zimbabwe
- Height: 6 ft 0 in (1.83 m)
- Weight: 15 st 10 lb (100 kg)

Playing information
- Position: Prop
Club
Years	Team	Pld	T	G	FG	P
2019–20	Wakefield Trinity	5	0	0	0	0
2019(loan)	→ Oldham	14	1	0	0	4
2020(loan)	→ Oldham	4	0	0	0	0
2021	London Broncos	20	3	0	0	12
2022	Halifax Panthers	19	1	0	0	4
2023–25	Sheffield Eagles	75	10	0	0	40
2026–	Doncaster RLFC	1	0	0	0	0
	Total	138	15	0	0	60
- Source: As of 19 May 2026

Titus Tendai Gwaze (born 8 June 1999) is a Zimbabwean professional rugby league footballer who plays as a prop for Doncaster RLFC in the Championship.

He previously played for Wakefield Trinity in the Super League and spent time on loan from Wakefield at Oldham in League 1.

== Background ==
Gwaze was born in Zimbabwe.

== Career ==
=== Wakefield Trinity ===
In 2019 he made his Super League début for Wakefield against the Warrington Wolves.

On 26 Jan 2021 it was reported that he had left Wakefield Trinity.

=== London Broncos ===
On 18 Feb 2021 it was reported that he had signed for the London Broncos in the RFL Championship.

=== Doncaster RLFC ===
On 29 January 2026 it was reported that he had signed for Doncaster RLFC in the RFL Championship on a 1-year deal.
