= Ray Bloom =

English cricketer

Ray Bloom (born George Raymond Bloom; 13 September 1941, in Aston, Sheffield, Yorkshire, England) was an English first-class cricketer, who played one match for Yorkshire in 1964. A left-handed batsman, he made his solitary appearance against Kent at Dover, scoring two runs before being bowled by Derek Underwood in his only innings, and taking two catches.

He was also associated with the Scarborough club. He played for Yorkshire Second XI in the Minor Counties championship from 1962 to 1964.
