= Michael Hyde =

American linguist

- Occupations: Linguist; professor

Academic background
- Education: Purdue University (Ph.D.)

Michael Hyde is an American linguist, currently a University Distinguished Professor at Wake Forest University. He received a Distinguished Scholar Award in 2013 from the National Communication Association, and in 2019 he won the Association's Communication Ethics Top Book Award for his 2018 book The Interruption that We Are: The Health of the Lived Body, Narrative, and Public Moral Argument.

== Books ==
=== As author ===
- Communication Philosophy and the Technological Age (University of Alabama Press, 1982). ISBN 978-0817300777
- The Life-Giving Gift of Acknowledgment: A Philosophical and Rhetorical Inquiry (Purdue University Press, 2005). ISBN 9781557534026
- The Call of Conscience: Heidegger and Levinas, Rhetoric and the Euthanasia Debate (University of South Carolina Press, 2008). ISBN 978-1570037863
- Perfection: Coming to Terms with Being Human (Baylor University Press, 2010). ISBN 978-1602582446
- Openings: Acknowledging Essential Moments in Human Communication (Baylor University Press, 2012). ISBN 978-1602585836
- The Interruption That We Are: The Health of the Lived Body, Narrative, and Public Moral Argument (University of South Carolina Press, 2018). ISBN 978-1611177077

=== As editor ===
- (with Walter Jost) Rhetoric and Hermeneutics in Our Time: A Reader (Yale University Press, 1997). ISBN 978-0300068368
- The Ethos of Rhetoric (University of South Carolina Press, 2004). ISBN 978-1570035388
- (with Nancy M. P. King) Bioethics, Public Moral Argument, and Social Responsibility (Routledge, 2012) ISBN 9781138788664
- (with James A. Herrick) After the Genome: A Language for Our Biotechnological Future (Baylor University Press, 2013). ISBN 9781602586857
