= 2021 Challenge Cup =

Rugby league competition

2021 Betfred Challenge Cup
- Duration: 6 rounds
- Number of teams: 28
- Broadcast partners: BBC Sport: The Sportsman
- Winners: St Helens
- Runners-up: Castleford Tigers
- Biggest home win: Salford Red Devils 68–4 Widnes Vikings (10 April 2021)
- Biggest away win: West Wales Raiders 4–58 Widnes Vikings (21 March 2021)
- Lance Todd Trophy: Niall Evalds
- Top try-scorer(s): 7, Regan Grace ( St Helens)

The 2021 Challenge Cup, known for sponsorship reasons as the 2021 Betfred Challenge Cup, was the 120th edition of the Challenge Cup, the main rugby league knockout tournament in British rugby league run by the Rugby Football League (RFL). This year's competition will be contested between only the professional clubs.

The competition was won by St Helens who beat Castleford 26–12 at Wembley Stadium on 17 July 2021.

Leeds Rhinos were the defending champions, after defeating Salford Red Devils 17–16 in the 2020 final. However, they were eliminated in round 3, after losing 18–24 to St Helens.

== Entrants ==
Usually the Challenge Cup is contested between the clubs of the professional Super League, Championship, League 1 and a number of invited amateur teams. However this year, due to the COVID-19 pandemic in the United Kingdom, the 2021 Challenge Cup did not include the amateur teams. French-side Toulouse Olympique who play in the Championship choose not to play in cup competitions.

The matches were broadcast by the BBC with the initial rounds being made available online with matches from the last 16 being broadcast on television following the BBC agreeing a new three year deal with the RFL. The date for the 2021 final was confirmed prior to the 2020 Challenge Cup Final with the hopes that fans will be able to be admitted.

== Rounds ==
When the details of the competition were announced in December 2020, it was envisaged that the first round, would feature the League 1 clubs; and Dewsbury Rams, Newcastle Thunder, Oldham and Whitehaven from the Championship. The rest of the Championship clubs enter at round two, with the Super League clubs entering in round four.

It was also announced, that the early rounds of the competition will also form the early rounds of the 1895 Cup with the highest four teams from the Championship and League 1, becoming the semi-finalists of the 1895 Cup, with the final to be played, on the same day as the Challenge Cup Final at Wembley.

The first round draw was due to be held on the week commencing 4 January 2021. However, due to the UK lockdown, this was delayed.

A further meeting of the clubs was held on 13 January 2021, to discuss alternative schedules for both the cup competitions and the league fixtures, due to the ongoing COVID-19 pandemic. Several contingency plans were announced, which mostly affected the involvement of the League 1 clubs in the Challenge Cup.

1. Start the 2021 League 1 season in March, and allow the League 1 clubs to enter the Challenge Cup as previously announced.
2. Delay the start of the League 1 campaign until May and omit the League 1 clubs from the cup competition.
3. Delay the start of League 1 until May, but let the League 1 clubs decide individually whether to enter the cup or not. However, this may involve them playing one or two fixtures in March, and then face a two-month gap, until the start of the league games, during which they may not be able to take advantage of the British government's furlough scheme.

After further discussion around option 3, the majority of the League 1 clubs decided not to participate in the competition. Barrow, Keighley and West Wales Raiders, decided to enter, and played in a 16-team round 1 with the 13 participating Championship clubs.

Round 1 was scheduled for the weekend of 20–21 March.

After the announcement, at least two League 1 clubs, Rochdale and Hunslet, expressed disappointment and claimed that a selection process had taken place rather than all clubs withdrawing.

Any club unable to fulfil a tie in the first two rounds will forfeit the fixture to their opponents. Ties unable to be played due to a team having seven or more players out due to COVID-19 restrictions, will be re-arranged and will take precedence over league fixtures.

=== Format and dates ===
Format and round dates for the 2021 Challenge Cup
Round	Date	Clubs involved this round	Winners from previous round	New entries this round	Leagues entering at this round
Round 1	20–21 March	16	None	16	13 UK based Championship teams and 3 League 1 teams
Round 2	27–28 March	8	8	None	None
Round 3	10–11 April	16	4	12	All 12 Super League clubs
Quarter-finals	8–9 May	8	8	None	None
Semi-finals	5–6 June	4	4	None	None
Final	17 July	2	2	None	None

== First round ==
The draw for the first and second rounds of the competition was made on 11 February 2021. The first round games were played over the weekend of 20/21 March 2021.

Due to COVID-19 regulations prohibiting live attendances all the first round games were broadcast live either on the RFL's Our League app or on the BBC's Red Button and iPlayer services or on The Sportsman online services.

Betfred Challenge Cup round 1: results
Home	Score	Away	Match Information
Home	Score	Away	Date and Time	Venue	Referee	Broadcast method
Sheffield Eagles	6–30	York City Knights	19 March 2021, 7:45pm	Keepmoat Stadium	Tom Grant	The Sportsman
Oldham	20–6	Barrow Raiders	20 March 2021, 1:45pm	Bower Fold	Marcus Griffiths	Our League
London Broncos	24–10	Keighley Cougars	20 March 2021, 3:00pm	The Rock	Rob Hicks	Our League
Whitehaven	23–16	Dewsbury Rams	20 March 2021, 5:15pm	Recreation Ground	James Child	Our League
Halifax Panthers	6–19	Batley Bulldogs	20 March 2021, 7:30pm	The Shay	Ben Thaler	Our League
West Wales Raiders	4–58	Widnes Vikings	21 March 2021, 12:45pm	Stebonheath Park	Liam Moore	BBC services
Featherstone Rovers	41–16	Bradford Bulls	21 March 2021, 3:00pm	Millennium Stadium	Chris Kendall	BBC services
Swinton Lions	28–16	Newcastle Thunder	21 March 2021, 5:15pm	Heywood Road	Scott Mikalauskas	Our League

== Second round ==
The second round games took place a week after the first round over the weekend of 27/28 March 2021. All four games were shown free-to-air either via BBC services or via The Sportsman.

Betfred Challenge Cup round 2: results
Home	Score	Away	Match Information
Home	Score	Away	Date and Time	Venue	Referee	Broadcast method
Featherstone Rovers	30–22	Batley Bulldogs	27 March 2021, 12:45pm	Millennium Stadium	Gareth Hewer	The Sportsman
Swinton Lions	23–14	Oldham	28 March 2021, 12:30pm	Heywood Road	Tom Grant	BBC Services
London Broncos	2–14	York City Knights	28 March 2021, 2:30pm	The Rock	Marcus Griffiths	BBC Services
Widnes Vikings	34–10	Whitehaven	28 March 2021, 5:00pm	DCBL Stadium	Jack Smith	The Sportsman

== Third round ==
The draw for the third round was made on Monday 29 March on the BBC Sport website, the draw was made by Oliver Dowden MP, the Secretary of State for the Department for Digital, Culture, Media and Sport. The matches will be played over the weekend of 10–11 April. As matches are still to be played behind closed doors, all eight ties will be broadcast live.

The match between Castleford and Hull Kingston Rovers became one of the longest games in rugby league. With scores tied at 32-all after 80 minutes, the game went to the fourth period of extra time (each period being 5 minutes) and it was not until the 99th minute that a winning score was made when Gareth O'Brien kicked a drop goal to give Castleford the victory.

Betfred Challenge Cup round 3: results
Home	Score	Away	Match information
Home	Score	Away	Date and Time	Venue	Referee	Broadcast method
Hull KR	32–33 (Note: After golden point extra time)	Castleford Tigers	9 April 2021, 6:00pm	Craven Park	Rob Hicks	Our League
York City Knights	0–26	Wigan Warriors	9 April 2021, 7:45pm	York Community Stadium	Marcus Griffiths	The Sportsman
Salford Red Devils	68–4	Widnes Vikings	10 April 2021, 12:30pm	AJ Bell Stadium	Scott Mikalauskas	Our League
St Helens	26–18	Leeds Rhinos	10 April 2021, 2:30pm	Totally Wicked Stadium	Ben Thaler	BBC One
Catalans Dragons	26–6	Wakefield Trinity	10 April 2021, 5:00pm	Totally Wicked Stadium (Note: Due to COVID-19 travel restrictions between France and the UK this match is being played at a neutral ground in the UK.)	Chris Kendall	BBC Two
Featherstone Rovers	14–34	Hull F.C.	10 April 2021, 7:00pm	Millennium Stadium	James Child	Our League
Swinton Lions	8–32	Warrington Wolves	11 April 2021, 12:30pm	Heywood Road	Tom Grant	Our League
Leigh Centurions	18–36	Huddersfield Giants	11 April 2021, 2:30pm	Leigh Sports Village	Liam Moore	Our League

== Quarter-finals ==
The draw was made live on BBC Two, during the half-time interval of the third round match between Catalans Dragons and Wakefield Trinity. The draw was made by BBC presenter Mark Chapman and former St Helens player Jon Wilkin. The ties will be played as double-headers on consecutive days at Emerald Headingley, Leeds; Sky Sports will broadcast St Helens v Huddersfield, and Catalans v Warrington on the evening of Friday 7 May, while the BBC will show Hull v Wigan on BBC One, and Castleford v Salford on BBC Two on Saturday 8 May.

The match between Castleford Tigers and Salford Red Devils was the second game to go to golden point extra time. With the score 18–12 to Castleford, Lee Mossop scored a try in the last minute, which with the conversion, to levelled the score at 18–18, and send the game to extra time. with less than 2 minutes on the clock, Gareth O'Brien kicked a drop goal to give Castleford the victory.

Team A	Score	Team B	Match information
Team A	Score	Team B	Date and Time	Venue	Referee	Broadcast method
Catalans Dragons	6–16	Warrington Wolves	7 May 2021, 6:00pm	Emerald Headingley	Liam Moore	Sky Sports
St Helens	23–18	Huddersfield Giants	7 May 2021, 8:15pm	Emerald Headingley	James Child	Sky Sports
Hull FC	20–10	Wigan Warriors	8 May 2021, 2:30pm	Emerald Headingley	Robert Hicks	BBC Two
Castleford Tigers	19–18 (Note: After golden point extra time)	Salford Red Devils	8 May 2021, 5:30pm	Emerald Headingley	Ben Thaler	BBC Two

== Semi-finals ==
The draw for the semi-final was made live on BBC Two, during the half-time interval of the quarter-final match between Castleford Tigers and Salford Red Devils. The draw was made by BBC presenter Mark Chapman, former Leeds Rhinos player Jamie Peacock, and former St Helens player Jon Wilkin.

Team A	Score	Team B	Match information
Team A	Score	Team B	Date and Time	Venue	Referee	Attendance	Broadcast method
Hull FC	18–33	St Helens	5 June 2021, 2:30pm	Leigh Sports Village	Liam Moore	(Note: due to covid restrictions in place at Leigh Sports Village, both sets of teams were given a limited amount of approximately, 600 tickets each to season ticket holders only.)	BBC One
Castleford Tigers	35–20	Warrington Wolves	5 June 2021, 5:00pm	Leigh Sports Village	Chris Kendall	(Note: due to covid restrictions in place at Leigh Sports Village, both sets of teams were given a limited amount of approximately, 600 tickets each to season ticket holders only.)	BBC Two

== Final ==
17 July 2021
15:00 BST (UTC+01:00)

Castleford Tigers	12 – 26	St Helens
Tries: Evalds, Trueman; Goals: O'Brien (2/2)	report	Tries: Fages, Roby, Makinson, Amor; Goals: Coote (5/7)

Wembley Stadium, London
Referee: Liam Moore
Player of the Match: Niall Evalds (Castleford Tigers)

=== Teams ===
Castleford Tigers: Evalds, Olpherts, Mata’utia, Shenton, Turner, Trueman, O'Brien, Griffin, McShane, Millington, Holmes, Sene-Lefao, Massey. Interchanges: Watts, Adam Milner, Foster, Smith

St Helens: Coote, Makinson, Naiqama, Percival, Grace, Lomax, Fages, Walmsley, Roby, McCarthy-Scarsbrook, Thompson, Batchelor, Knowles. Interchanges: Lees, Amor, Paasi, Welsby

== Broadcast matches ==
All matches in the first four rounds were broadcast live due to ongoing COVID-19 regulations in the United Kingdom requiring the matches to be played behind closed doors. Due to the exceptional circumstances imposed by COVID-19 the RFL made the decision to arrange for every game played behind closed doors to be broadcast live. Normal broadcast partner, the BBC, showed games from rounds one and two via the BBC Sport website or on the BBC Sport app with games from round three were show on terrestrial channels. A new to rugby league broadcaster, The Sportsman's digital services, showed games from all the first three rounds on its website or social media channels. The games that were not picked up by the BBC or The Sportsman's digital services were broadcast by the RFL itself on a pay-per-view basis via the Our League app. For the quarter-finals, Sky Sports broadcast two of the four matches with the BBC showing the other two. With the semi-final and the final being broadcast on BBC One and Two this was the first staging of the Challenge Cup in which every tie was broadcast live.

== See also ==
- 2021 Women's Challenge Cup
