= BOAC Flight 712 =

1968 aviation accident in England

- The aircraft burning on the runway

Accident
- Date: 8 April 1968
- Summary: Uncontained engine failure resulting in number 2 engine catching fire and detaching
- Site: Hounslow, United Kingdom

Aircraft
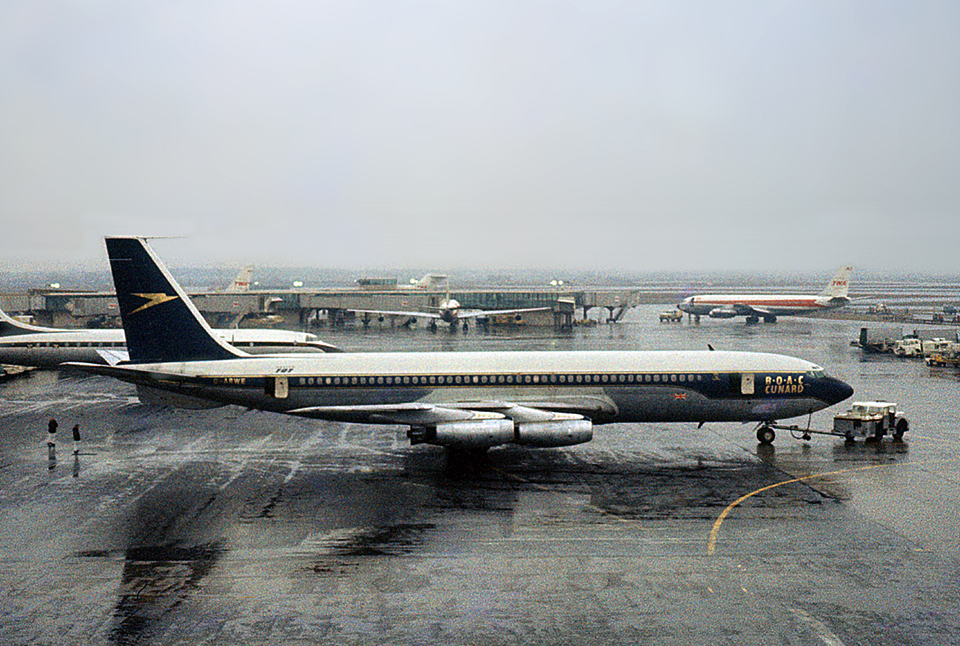
- G-ARWE, the aircraft involved in the accident, while still in service with BOAC-Cunard in 1965
- Aircraft type: Boeing 707-465
- Operator: British Overseas Airways Corporation
- IATA flight No.: BA712
- Call sign: SPEEDBIRD 712
- Registration: G-ARWE
- Flight origin: London Heathrow Airport; Middlesex, United Kingdom
- 1st stopover: Zürich Airport; Zürich, Switzerland
- 2nd stopover: Singapore International Airport, Singapore
- Destination: Sydney Airport; Sydney, Australia
- Occupants: 127
- Passengers: 116
- Crew: 11
- Fatalities: 5
- Injuries: 38
- Survivors: 122

BOAC Flight 712 was a British Overseas Airways Corporation (BOAC) service operated by a Boeing 707 from London Heathrow Airport bound for Sydney via Zurich and Singapore. On Monday 8 April 1968, it suffered an engine failure on takeoff that quickly led to a major fire; the engine detached from the aircraft in flight. After the aircraft had made a successful emergency landing, confusion over checklists and distractions from the presence of a check pilot contributed to the deaths of 5 of the 127 on board. The direct cause of the fire was the failure of a compressor wheel, due to metal fatigue.

Flight attendant Barbara Jane Harrison was posthumously awarded the George Cross for heroism during the accident, another crew member received a British Empire Medal, and an air traffic controller was made a Member of the Most Excellent Order of the British Empire. As a result of the accident, BOAC changed certain aspects of its emergency procedure checklists.

== Flight ==
Flight 712, scheduled to depart from Heathrow's Terminal 3 at 16:15 BST (15:15 GMT), took off from Runway 28L at 16:27 BST (15:27 GMT). It had 127 people aboard, including a crew augmented by the addition of an acting flight officer, John Hutchinson, and a check captain for routine performance review of the pilot in command, Captain Cliff Taylor. As well as the passengers, the aircraft was carrying baggage, mail and a radioactive isotope from the Isotope Production Unit at Harwell destined for the University Hospital in Jerusalem.

Seconds after takeoff from Heathrow's then-9,000-foot-long (2,700 m) runway 28L (extended, years later, and now re-designated as 27L), there was an unexpected bang and the aircraft started vibrating. The throttle controlling number two engine was shutting down. While Taylor ordered an engine failure drill, Flight Engineer Thomas Hicks carried out the engine failure drill, but both he and Check Captain Geoffrey Moss reached for the switch to cancel the undercarriage warning horn. At the same time, First Officer Francis Kirkland inadvertently cancelled the fire bell. Hicks reached for, but did not pull, the engine fire shut-off handle. Moss, observing the fire, exclaimed, "Bloody hell! The wing's on fire!"

The aircraft in flight over Thorpe, with the detached engine (circled)

In the control tower, the takeoff had been observed by John Davis, who saw what he initially thought was the sun reflecting off the aircraft's wing during its initial climb. Davis quickly realised that the aircraft was on fire. Davis instructed Flight 712 to make a left turn, with the intention that the aircraft would land on runway 28L. He hit the "crash button" which alerted the emergency services and declared an aircraft accident. The emergency services were informed of the type of aircraft involved and given a meeting point at which they were to assemble.

By this time, the windows on the port side at the rear of the fuselage were beginning to melt. As the aircraft flew over Thorpe the burning engine broke away from its mounting (Note: The 707's engine pylons were made from magnesium and were designed to burn through in the case of an uncontained engine fire, to prevent the fire from reaching the wing fuel tanks.); no one on the ground was injured. At this time, the undercarriage was lowered and full flap selected. The flaps stopped three degrees short of their full travel. The aircraft was at a height of 3,000 feet (900 m) and flying at 225 knots (417 km/h; 259 mph). Cabin crew member Jennifer Suares repeated the emergency landing drill for passengers.

The crew realised that the aircraft would not last long enough to land back on 28L and declared a mayday at 16:29. Davis cleared the aircraft to land on runway 05R, which was 7,733 feet (2,357 m) long. He also instructed two other aircraft to perform a go-around, as runway 05R crossed runway 28R, which they were due to land on and Davis did not know whether Flight 712 would be able to stop before reaching that runway. The crew accepted Davis's offer of runway 05R, even though it was much shorter and not equipped with ILS. Taylor was able to safely land the aircraft on 05R, using wheel brakes and thrust reversing the outboard engines to halt the aircraft. The aircraft touched down about 400 yards (1,200 ft; 370 m) beyond the threshold and stopped in 1,400 yards (4,200 ft; 1,300 m). Taylor asked Davis for permission to evacuate, but the cabin crew were already opening the emergency doors. The flight crew started the fire drill, but the port wing exploded before this could be completed. As a result, the fire shut off handles were not pulled, and the booster pumps and electrical supply were left switched on. Due to the short period of time between the mayday being declared at 16:29 and the aircraft landing at 16:31, there was no time for the emergency services to lay a carpet of foam, which was standard practice at the time.

=== Evacuation ===
The cabin crew started the evacuation, even before the aircraft had come to a halt, via both forward galley doors, both rear doors and the starboard overwing exits. Eighteen passengers escaped via the overwing exits before the fire grew too intense to use that route. The forward port galley door escape slide caught fire before it could be used, but one person jumped from there. Eighty-four people escaped via the starboard galley door. Three of the crew escaped by using the emergency cockpit rope. The rear starboard door escape slide had twisted on deployment, so Taylor climbed down to straighten it, leaving stewardess Jane Harrison at the door assisting the passengers. Six passengers escaped via this route before the slide was punctured and deflated. Harrison pushed out passengers too frightened to jump. Eleven people escaped via this route, and five more escaped via the rear port door before the slide was destroyed. Harrison was last seen preparing to jump, but she turned back and disappeared into the passenger cabin, in an attempt to save the remaining four passengers, including a disabled woman and an eight-year-old girl. Harrison was awarded the George Cross posthumously in recognition of her selfless courage. Thirty-five people were injured, and five died.

=== Fire-fighting ===
The first two fire engines to arrive were unable to do much, as they stopped too far from the aircraft and their design prevented their moving once they began making foam. Also, buildup of paint on the coupling threads of nearby fire hydrants prevented hoses from being attached. A backup foam water tender drove in closer and discharged its foam effectively, but the fire had already gained hold by then.

== Passengers ==
The aircraft was carrying 116 passengers and eleven crew. Five people died in the accident: stewardess Barbara Jane Harrison and four passengers. All five were determined to have died of "asphyxia due to inhalation of fire fumes".

Survivors included the pop singer Mark Wynter, who was travelling to Australia to be married, and Katriel Katz, Israeli ambassador to the Soviet Union. Katz, a large man, was the only passenger to escape by jumping through the forward port door; Hutchinson and Unwin tried to direct him to the slide on the starboard side and were almost carried through the port door by Katz, who was seriously injured in the jump.

== Aircraft involved ==
The aircraft involved was a Boeing 707-465 registered G-ARWE (Note: Manufacturer's serial number 18373, Boeing line number 302.) with a total of 20,870 flight hours since it first flew on 27 June 1962. On 21 November 1967 it had suffered an engine failure resulting in an aborted takeoff with no injuries. The aircraft was insured for £2,200,000 with Lloyd's of London.

== Investigation ==
In the subsequent investigation, metal fatigue was ultimately blamed for the failure of the number five compressor wheel in the number two Rolls-Royce 508 Conway turbofan engine, starting the rapid chain of failures. The crew's omitting to shut off the fuel to the engine was blamed for the rapid growth of the fire and the loss of the aircraft. Check Captain Moss had accidentally cancelled the fire warning bell instead of the undercarriage warning bell. Moss had also issued orders to Captain Taylor, in breach of the normal protocol for his duties. However, the report on the accident also stated that Captain Taylor had briefed Moss to act as an extra set of eyes and ears inside and outside the cockpit. Moss's actions therefore could be seen as acting within that remit.

As a result of the investigation, and lessons learned from the chain of events, BOAC combined the "Engine Fire Drill" and "Engine Severe Failure Drill" checklists into one list, called the "Engine Fire or Severe Failure Drill". Modifications were also made to the checklist, including adding confirmation that the fire handles had been pulled to the checklist.

== Awards ==
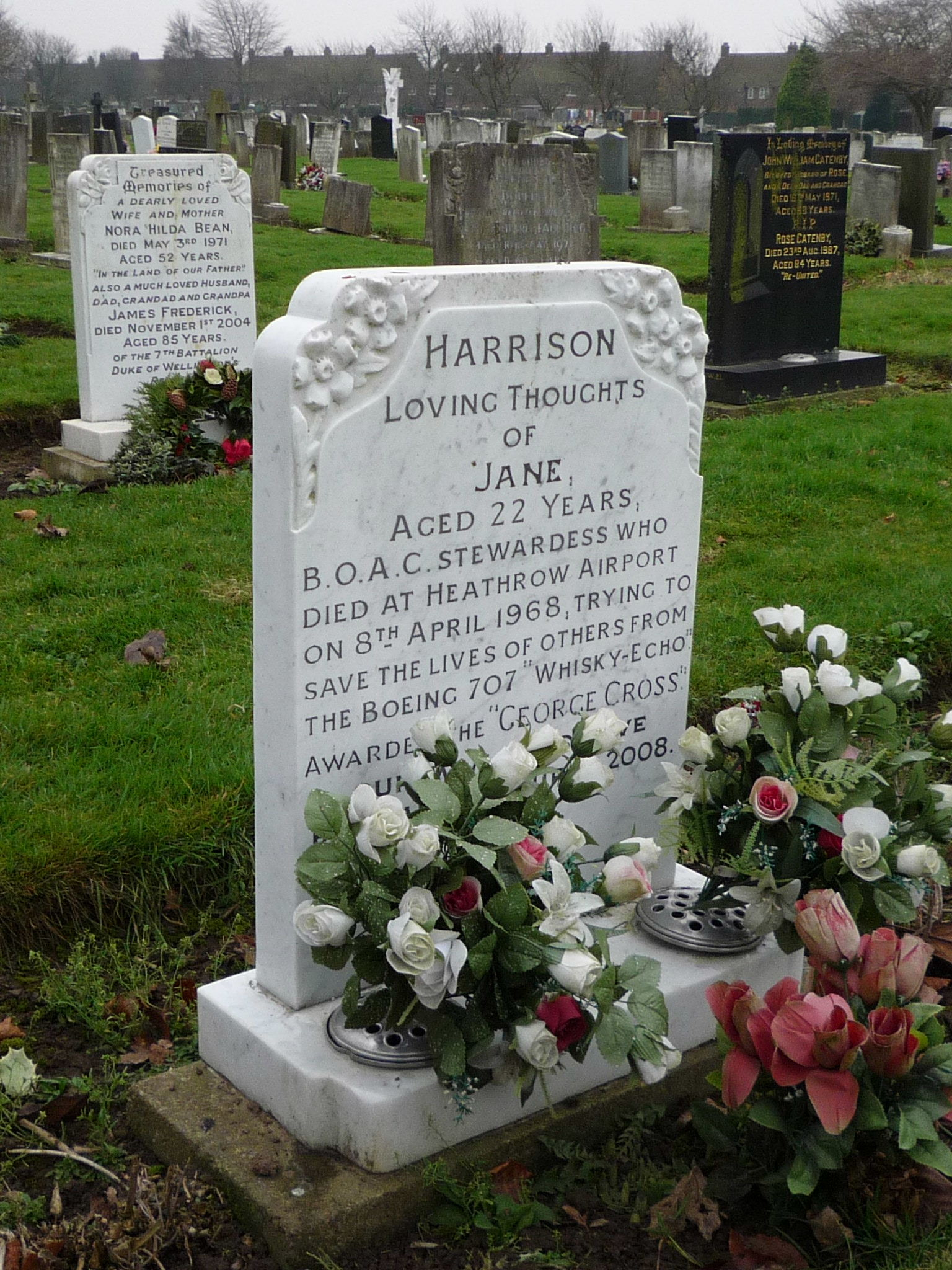
Barbara Jane Harrison's grave

Queen Elizabeth II awarded Barbara Jane Harrison a posthumous George Cross (GC), the only GC ever presented to a woman in peacetime. Her medal was accepted on her behalf by her father, Alan. Harrison is the youngest ever female recipient of the George Cross. Neville Davis-Gordon was awarded the British Empire Medal for Gallantry (BEM). John Davis was appointed a Member of the Most Excellent Order of the British Empire (MBE).

The citation for Barbara Jane Harrison's GC reads:-

On 8 April 1968, soon after take-off from Heathrow Airport, No. 2 engine of B.O.A.C. Boeing 707 G-ARWE caught fire and subsequently fell from the aircraft, leaving a fierce fire burning at No. 2 engine position. About two and a half minutes later the aircraft made an emergency landing at the airport and the fire on the port wing intensified. Miss Harrison was one of the stewardesses in this aircraft and the duties assigned to her in an emergency were to help the steward at the aft station to open the appropriate rear door and inflate the escape chute and then to assist the passengers at the rear of the aircraft to leave in an orderly manner. When the aircraft landed Miss Harrison and the steward concerned opened the rear galley door and inflated the chute, which unfortunately became twisted on the way down so that the steward had to climb down it to straighten it before it could be used. Once out of the aircraft he was unable to return; hence Miss Harrison was left alone to the task of shepherding passengers to the rear door and helping them out of the aircraft. She encouraged some passengers to jump from the machine and pushed out others. With flames and explosions all around her and escape from the tail of the machine impossible she directed her passengers to another exit while she remained at her post. She was finally overcome while trying to save an elderly cripple who was seated in one of the last rows and whose body was found close to that of the stewardess. Miss Harrison was a very brave young lady who gave her life in her utter devotion to duty.

The citation for Neville Davis-Gordon's BEM reads:-

Award of the British Empire Medal for Gallantry (Civil Division)

On 8 April 1968, soon after take-off from Heathrow Airport, No. 2 engine of B.O.A.C. Boeing 707 G-ARWE caught fire, and subsequently fell from the aircraft, leaving a fierce fire burning at the No. 2 engine position. About two and a half minutes later the aircraft made an emergency landing at the airport and the fire on the port wing intensified. Mr. Davis-Gordon was Chief Steward aboard the aircraft, under his command, the cabin staff successfully organised the escape of 112 passengers, from a total of 116 from the burning aircraft. The Chief Steward's firm and calm instructions not only guided passengers to the most appropriate exit, but clearly helped to avoid any panic. On one occasion it was necessary for Mr. Davis-Gordon to get out on to the starboard wing to assist a passenger who had become stranded there because of the spread of the fire. He helped her back, re-entered the aircraft and directed her to a safe escape exit at the front of the aircraft. By remaining on the aircraft until he was satisfied all survivors had left the main cabin, he risked his life in the knowledge that a further explosion might occur at any moment and engulf the aircraft. His coolness and qualities of leadership were of a high order and an inspiration to his cabin staff, who themselves displayed high qualities of devotion to duty in spite of the obvious perils of the situation.

In addition, Air Traffic Control Officer John Davis, who was responsible for Flight 712 and had first spotted the port engine fire from the ground, was appointed MBE.

Captain Cliff Taylor and Acting First Officer John Hutchinson had managed to safely land their aircraft which, having lost an engine, was on fire carrying about 22,000 imp gal (100,000 L; 26,000 US gal) of fuel, in the most testing of circumstances and almost certainly saved 121 lives. Taylor was recommended for an award by BOAC, but following the publication of the official inquiry report in August 1969, the decision was taken at ministerial level not to recognise any member of the flight crew. Both Taylor and Hutchinson received, along with First Officer Francis Kirkland and Check Captain Geoffrey Moss, but not Flight Engineer Thomas Hicks, commendations from BOAC, and Captain Taylor was awarded the British Airline Pilots Association Gold Medal.

== See also ==
Other accidents in which aircrew were decorated include:

- Pan Am Flight 73, a hijacking in which stewardess Neerja Bhanot was posthumously awarded her country's highest civilian honour.
- Alrosa Mirny Air Enterprise Flight 514
- Southwest Flight 1380
- British Airways Flight 5390
- United Airlines Flight 232
- US Airways Flight 1549
- 2003 Baghdad DHL attempted shootdown incident
- British Airtours Flight 28M
- Qantas Flight 32
- Cathay Pacific Flight 780
