= 2021 RFL 1895 Cup =

Rugby league competition in the United Kingdom

- Duration: 4 rounds
- Number of teams: 16
- Winners: Featherstone Rovers
- Runners-up: York City Knights
- Ray French Award: Craig Hall

The 2021 RFL 1895 Cup, known as the 2021 AB Sundecks 1895 Cup for sponsorship reasons, is the second playing (Note: The inaugural competition was in 2019 but the 2020 tournament was cancelled due to the COVID-19 pandemic) of the RFL 1895 Cup, a rugby league football competition for clubs in the United Kingdom. The competition is for the professional clubs who play in the Championship and League 1 (the second and third tiers of rugby league in the United Kingdom) and was played between March and July 2021.

The final was played as a curtain raiser to the 2021 Challenge Cup Final at Wembley Stadium, London on 17 July 2021.

The cup was won by Featherstone Rovers who beat York City Knights 41–34. Featherstone's Craig Hall won the Ray French Award for player of the match.

== Format ==
With the Rugby Football League (RFL) anticipating that the 2021 season would be affected to some degree by the ongoing COVID-19 pandemic, the decision was taken in December 2020 for the early rounds of the Challenge Cup to also act as the early rounds of the 1895 Cup. This was made possible by amateur teams, who would normally compete in the Challenge Cup, being excluded from that tournament in 2021, such that only teams eligible for the 1895 Cup were competing in rounds 1 and 2 of the Challenge Cup. The four teams progressing into the third round of the Challenge Cup, in which teams from Super League entered, also became the semi-finalists of the 1895 Cup.

== Teams ==
Three League 1 sides were able to enter the competition; Barrow Raiders, Keighley Cougars and West Wales Raiders were chosen from those teams who were able to, in the context of the Covid-19 pandemic, commit to being available for the first round date. They were joined in round 1 by the 13 English clubs from the Championship. French side Toulouse Olympique who are the 14th participants in the Championship did not enter either competition.

== First round ==
The draw for the first and second rounds of the competition was made on 11 February 2021. The first round games were played over the weekend of 20/21 March 2021.

Due to COVID-19 regulation prohibiting live attendances all the first round games were broadcast live either on the RFL's Our League app or on the BBC's Red Button and iPlayer services or on The Sportsman online services.

| Home | Score | Away | Match Information |
| Home | Score | Away | Date and Time | Venue | Referee | Broadcast method |
|---|---|---|---|---|---|---|
| Sheffield Eagles | 6–30 | York City Knights | 19 March 2021, 7:45pm | Keepmoat Stadium | Tom Grant | The Sportsman |
| Oldham | 20–6 | Barrow Raiders | 20 March 2021, 1:45pm | Bower Fold | Marcus Griffiths | Our League |
| London Broncos | 24–10 | Keighley Cougars | 20 March 2021, 3:00pm | The Rock | Rob Hicks | Our League |
| Whitehaven | 23–16 | Dewsbury Rams | 20 March 2021, 5:15pm | Recreation Ground | James Child | Our League |
| Halifax Panthers | 6-19 | Batley Bulldogs | 20 March 2021, 7:30pm | The Shay | Ben Thaler | Our League |
| West Wales Raiders | 4–58 | Widnes Vikings | 21 March 2021, 12:45pm | Stebonheath Park | Liam Moore | BBC services |
| Featherstone Rovers | 41–16 | Bradford Bulls | 21 March 2021, 3:00pm | Millennium Stadium | Chris Kendall | BBC services |
| Swinton Lions | 28–16 | Newcastle Thunder | 21 March 2021, 5:15pm | Heywood Road | Scott Mikalauskas | Our League |

== Second round ==
The second round games took place a week after the first round over the weekend of 27/28 March 2021. All four games were shown free-to-air either via BBC services or via The Sportsman.

| Home | Score | Away | Match Information |
| Home | Score | Away | Date and Time | Venue | Referee | Broadcast method |
|---|---|---|---|---|---|---|
| Featherstone Rovers | 30–22 | Batley Bulldogs | 27 March 2021, 12:45pm | Millennium Stadium | Gareth Hewer | The Sportsman |
| Swinton Lions | 23–14 | Oldham | 28 March 2021, 12:30pm | Heywood Road | Tom Grant | BBC Services |
| London Broncos | 2–14 | York City Knights | 28 March 2021, 2:30pm | The Rock | Marcus Griffiths | BBC Services |
| Widnes Vikings | 34–10 | Whitehaven | 28 March 2021, 5:00pm | DCBL Stadium | Jack Smith | The Sportsman |

== Semi-finals ==
The semi-final draw was made on 28 April 2021.

| Home | Score | Away | Match Information |
| Home | Score | Away | Date and Time | Venue | Referee | Attendance | Broadcast method |
|---|---|---|---|---|---|---|---|
| York City Knights | 36–22 | Swinton Lions | 6 June 2021, 2:00pm | LNER Community Stadium | Tom Grant | | OurLeague |
| Featherstone Rovers | 24–18 | Widnes Vikings | 6 June 2021, 4:00pm | Millennium Stadium | Ben Thaler | | OurLeague |

== Final ==
| Home | Score | Away | Match Information |
| Home | Score | Away | Date and Time | Venue | Referee | Attendance | Broadcast method |
|---|---|---|---|---|---|---|---|
| York City Knights | 34–41 | Featherstone Rovers | 17 July 2021, 12:00pm | Wembley Stadium, London | Robert Hicks | | BBC red button |
