= List of Mexican Catholic saints =

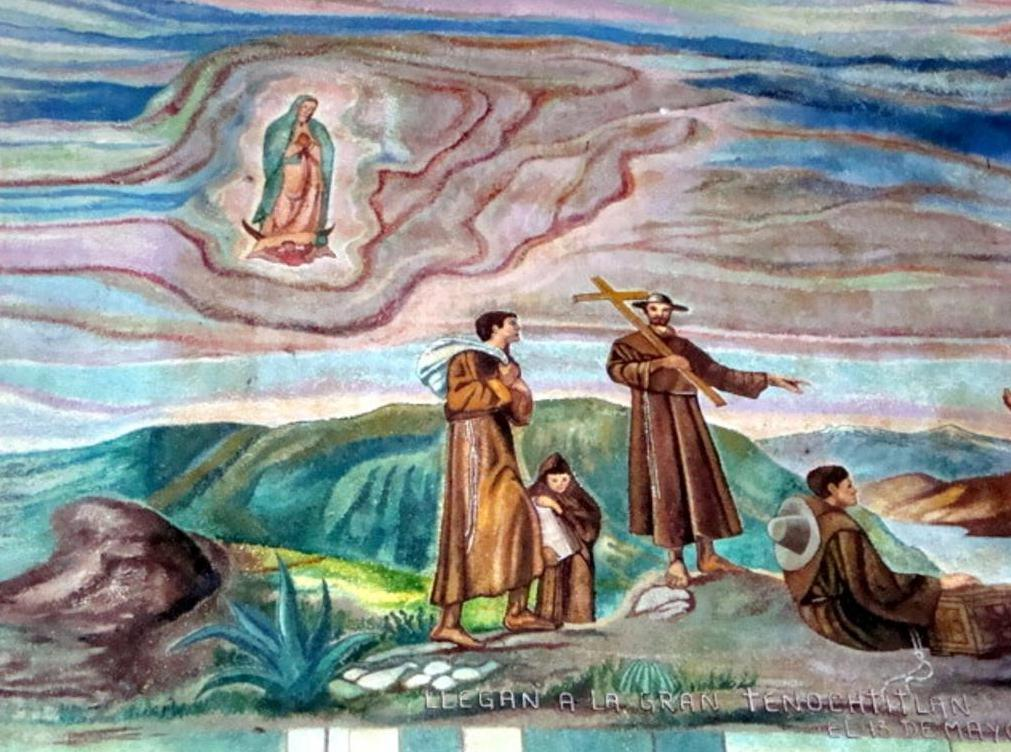
Mural representing the catechization of Mexico at Our Lady of Guadalupe Church, Venustiano Carranza, Mexico City

The Catholic Church recognizes some deceased Catholics as saints, blesseds, venerables, and Servants of God. Some of these people were born, died, or lived their religious life in the present territory of Mexico. Because of missionaries who spent greater or lesser amounts of time in Mexico en route to other mission lands, exact numbers of Mexican saints vary. The Catholic Church has been present in what is now Mexico since the earliest years of the sixteenth century. As early as 1517, the expedition of Francisco Hernández de Córdoba brought Catholicism to the Yucatan, where the first diocese in continental North America would be erected in 1518. Mexico's first saint was canonized in 1862. Today, Mexico accounts for more saints and Blesseds than any other country in the Western Hemisphere.

== Mexican saints ==
=== Individual causes ===
Image	Name	Born	Died	Church Status
	José María de Yermo y Parres	10 November 1851; Jalmolonga, State of Mexico, Mexico	20 September 1904; Puebla, Puebla, Mexico	Priest of the Diocese of León; Founder of the Servants of the Sacred Heart of Jesus and of the Poor
	José María de Yermo y Parres	10 November 1851; Jalmolonga, State of Mexico, Mexico	20 September 1904; Puebla, Puebla, Mexico	Introduction of Cause: N/A; Declared "Venerable": 7 September 1989; Beatified: 6 May 1990 by Pope John Paul II; Canonized: 21 May 2000 by Pope John Paul II
	María Natividad Venegas de la Torre (rel. name: María of Jesus in the Blessed Sacrament)	8 September 1868; Zapotlanejo, Jalisco, Mexico	30 July 1959; Guadalajara, Jalisco, Mexico	Founder of the Daughters of the Sacred Heart of Jesus of Guadalajara
	María Natividad Venegas de la Torre (rel. name: María of Jesus in the Blessed Sacrament)	8 September 1868; Zapotlanejo, Jalisco, Mexico	30 July 1959; Guadalajara, Jalisco, Mexico	Introduction of Cause: N/A; Declared "Venerable": 13 May 1989; Beatified: 22 November 1992 by Pope John Paul II; Canonized: 21 May 2000 by Pope John Paul II
	Juan Diego Cuauhtlatoatzin	1474; Cuautitlán, Tenochtitlan, Aztec Empire	1548; Tepeyac, Mexico City, New Spain	Married Layperson of the Archdiocese of Mexico City, apparitions of Our Lady of Guadalupe
	Juan Diego Cuauhtlatoatzin	1474; Cuautitlán, Tenochtitlan, Aztec Empire	1548; Tepeyac, Mexico City, New Spain	Introduction of Cause: N/A; Declared "Venerable": 9 April 1990; Beatified: 6 May 1990 by Pope John Paul II; Canonized: 31 July 2002 by Pope John Paul II
	Rafael Guízar y Valencia	16 April 1878; Cotija de la Paz, Michoacán, Mexico	6 June 1938; Mexico City, Mexico	Bishop of Xalapa
	Rafael Guízar y Valencia	16 April 1878; Cotija de la Paz, Michoacán, Mexico	6 June 1938; Mexico City, Mexico	Introduction of Cause: N/A; Declared "Venerable": 27 November 1981; Beatified: 29 January 1995 by Pope John Paul II; Canonized: 15 October 2006 by Pope Benedict XVI
	Anastasia Guadalupe García Zavala (rel. name: María Guadalupe)	27 April 1878; Zapopan, Jalisco, Mexico	24 June 1963; Guadalajara, Jalisco, Mexico	Cofounder of the Handmaids of Saint Margaret Mary and of the Poor
	Anastasia Guadalupe García Zavala (rel. name: María Guadalupe)	27 April 1878; Zapopan, Jalisco, Mexico	24 June 1963; Guadalajara, Jalisco, Mexico	Introduction of Cause: N/A; Declared "Venerable": 1 July 2000; Beatified: 25 April 2004 by Pope John Paul II; Canonized: 12 May 2013 by Pope Francis
	José Sánchez del Río	28 March 1913; Sahuayo, Michoacán, Mexico	10 February 1928; Sahuayo, Michoacán, Mexico	Child of the Diocese of Zamora; Martyr
	José Sánchez del Río	28 March 1913; Sahuayo, Michoacán, Mexico	10 February 1928; Sahuayo, Michoacán, Mexico	Introduction of Cause: N/A; Declared "Venerable": 22 June 2004; Beatified: 20 November 2005 by Cardinal José Saraiva Martins, C.M.F.; Canonized: 16 October 2016 by Pope Francis

=== Group martyrs ===
Image	Name	Born	Died	Church Status
As the 26 Martyrs of Japan (1597)
	Felipe de Jesús	1572; Mexico City, Viceroyalty of New Spain	5 February 1597; Nagasaki, Japan	Professed Priest of the Franciscan Friars Minor (Alcantarines); Martyr
	Felipe de Jesús	1572; Mexico City, Viceroyalty of New Spain	5 February 1597; Nagasaki, Japan	Introduction of Cause: N/A; Declared "Venerable": N/A; Beatified: 14 September 1627 by Pope Urban VIII; Canonized: 8 June 1862 by Pope Pius IX
Saints of the Cristero War (1915–1937)
	Cristóbal Magallanes Jara	30 July 1869; San Rafael, Totatiche, Jalisco, Mexico	25 May 1927; Colotlán, Jalisco, Mexico	Priest of the Archdiocese of Guadalajara
	Román Adame Rosales	27 February 1859; Teocaltiche, Jalisco, Mexico	21 April 1927; Yahualica, Jalisco, Mexico	Priest of the Archdiocese of Guadalajara
	Rodrigo Aguilar Alemán	13 March 1875; Sayula, Jalisco, Mexico	28 October 1927; Ejutla, Jalisco, Mexico	Priest of the Archdiocese of Guadalajara
	Julio Álvarez Mendoza	20 December 1886; Guadalajara, Jalisco, Mexico	30 March 1927; San Julián, Jalisco, Mexico	Priest of the Archdiocese of Guadalajara
	Luis Batis Sáinz	13 September 1870; Miguel Auza, Zacatecas, Mexico	15 August 1926; Chalchihuites, Zacatecas, Mexico	Priest of the Diocese of Durango
	Agustín Caloca Cortés	5 May 1898; La Presa, Zacatecas, Mexico	25 May 1927; Colotlán, Jalisco, Mexico	Priest of the Archdiocese of Guadalajara
	Mateo Correa Magallanes	23 July 1866; Tepechitlán, Zacatecas, Mexico	6 February 1927; Durango, Durango, Mexico	Priest of the Diocese of Durango
	Atilano Cruz Alvarado	5 October 1901; Teocaltiche, Jalisco, Mexico	1 July 1928; Cuquío, Jalisco, Mexico	Priest of the Archdiocese of Guadalajara
	Miguel de la Mora de la Mora	19 June 1874; Tecalitlán, Jalisco, Mexico	7 August 1927; Cardona, Colima, Mexico	Priest of the Diocese of Colima
	Pedro Esqueda Ramírez	29 April 1887; San Juan de los Lagos, Jalisco, Mexico	22 November 1927; Teocaltitán, Jalisco, Mexico	Priest of the Archdiocese of Guadalajara
	Margarito Flores García	22 February 1899; Taxco, Guerrero, Mexico	12 November 1927; Tulimán, Guerrero, Mexico	Priest of the Diocese of Chilpancingo
	José Isabel Flores Varela	28 November 1866; Santa María de la Paz, Zacatecas, Mexico	21 June 1927; Zapotlanejo, Jalisco, Mexico	Priest of the Archdiocese of Guadalajara
	David Galván Bermúdez	29 January 1881; Guadalajara, Jalisco, Mexico	30 January 1915; Guadalajara, Jalisco, Mexico	Priest of the Archdiocese of Guadalajara
	Salvador Lara Puente	13 August 1905; Súchil, Durango, Mexico	15 August 1926; Chalchihuites, Zacatecas, Mexico	Young Layperson of the Diocese of Durango
	Pedro de Jesús Maldonado Lucero	15 June 1892; Chihuahua, Chihuahua, Mexico	11 February 1937; Chihuahua, Chihuahua, Mexico	Priest of the Archdiocese of Chihuahua
	Jesús Méndez Montoya	10 June 1880; Tarímbaro, Michoacán, Mexico	5 February 1928; Valtierrilla, Guanajuato, Mexico	Priest of the Diocese of Morelia
	Manuel Morales Cervantes	8 February 1898; Sombrerete, Zacatecas, Mexico	15 August 1926; Chalchihuites, Zacatecas, Mexico	Married Layperson of the Diocese of Durango
	Justino Orona Madrigal	14 April 1877; Atoyac, Jalisco, Mexico	1 July 1928; Cuquío, Jalisco, Mexico	Priest of the Archdiocese of Guadalajara
	Sabás Reyes Salazar	c. 1516–17; Tizatlán, Tlaxcala, Mexico	13 April 1927; Cuquío, Jalisco, Mexico	Priest of the Archdiocese of Guadalajara
	José María Robles Hurtado	3 December 1883; Cocula, Jalisco, Mexico	13 April 1927; Tototlán, Jalisco, Mexico	Priest of the Archdiocese of Guadalajara
	David Roldán Lara	2 March 1902; Chalchihuites, Zacatecas, Mexico	15 August 1926; Chalchihuites, Zacatecas, Mexico	Young Layperson of the Diocese of Durango
	Toribio Romo González	16 April 1900; Jalostotitlán, Jalisco, Mexico	25 February 1928; Agua Caliente, Jalisco, Mexico	Priest of the Archdiocese of Guadalajara
	Jenaro Sánchez Delgadillo	19 September 1886; Agualele, Jalisco, Mexico	17 January 1927; La Loma, Jalisco, Mexico	Priest of the Archdiocese of Guadalajara
	Tranquilino Ubiarco Robles	8 July 1899; Ciudad Guzmán, Jalisco, Mexico	5 October 1928; Tepatitlán, Jalisco, Mexico	Priest of the Archdiocese of Guadalajara
	David Uribe Velasco	29 December 1899; Buenavista de Cuéllar, Guerrero, Mexico	12 April 1927; San José Vista Hermosa, Morelos, Mexico	Priest of the Diocese of Chilpancingo
		Introduction of Cause: N/A; Declared "Venerable": 7 March 1992; Beatified: 22 November 1992 by Pope John Paul II; Canonized: 21 May 2000 by Pope John Paul II		
Child Martyrs of Tlaxcala (1527–1529)
	Cristóbal	c. 1514–15; Atlihuetzia, Yauhquemecan, Mexico	1527; Atlihuetzia, Tlaxcala, Mexico	Children of the Diocese of Tlaxcala
	Antonio	c. 1516–17; Tizatlán, Tlaxcala, Mexico	1529; Cuautinchán, Puebla, Mexico	Children of the Diocese of Tlaxcala
	Juan	c. 1516–17; Tizatlán, Tlaxcala, Mexico	1529; Cuautinchán, Puebla, Mexico	Children of the Diocese of Tlaxcala
		Introduction of Cause: N/A; Declared "Venerable": 3 March 1990; Beatified: 6 May 1990 by Pope John Paul II; Canonized: 15 October 2017 by Pope Francis		

== Mexican blesseds ==
=== Individual causes ===
Image	Name	Born	Died	Church Status
	Sebastián de Aparicio Prado	20 January 1502; A Gudiña, Ourense, Spain	25 February 1600; Puebla, Puebla, New Spain	Professed Religious of the Franciscan Friars Minor
	Sebastián de Aparicio Prado	20 January 1502; A Gudiña, Ourense, Spain	25 February 1600; Puebla, Puebla, New Spain	Introduction of Cause: N/A; Declared "Venerable": May 2, 1768; Beatified: May 17, 1789 by Pope Pius VI
	Miguel Agustín Pro Juárez	13 January 1891; Guadalupe Zacatecas, Mexico	23 November 1927; Puebla, Puebla, New Spain	Professed Priest of the Jesuits; Martyr
	Miguel Agustín Pro Juárez	13 January 1891; Guadalupe Zacatecas, Mexico	23 November 1927; Puebla, Puebla, New Spain	Introduction of Cause: N/A; Declared "Venerable": November 10, 1986; Beatified: September 25, 1988 by Pope John Paul II
	Mateo Elías Nieves Castillo	21 September 1882; Yuriria, Guanajuato, Mexico	10 March 1928; Cañada de Caracheo, Guanajuato, Mexico	Professed Priest of the Augustinians; Martyr
	Mateo Elías Nieves Castillo	21 September 1882; Yuriria, Guanajuato, Mexico	10 March 1928; Cañada de Caracheo, Guanajuato, Mexico	Introduction of Cause: N/A; Declared "Venerable": December 17, 1996; Beatified: October 12, 1997 by Pope John Paul II
	Vicenta Chávez Orozco (rel. name: María Vicenta of Saint Dorothy)	6 February 1867; Cotija de la Paz, Michoacán de Ocampo, Mexico	30 July 1949; Guadalajara, Jalisco, Mexico	Founder of the Servants of the Holy Trinity and the Poor
	Vicenta Chávez Orozco (rel. name: María Vicenta of Saint Dorothy)	6 February 1867; Cotija de la Paz, Michoacán de Ocampo, Mexico	30 July 1949; Guadalajara, Jalisco, Mexico	Introduction of Cause: N/A; Declared "Venerable": December 21, 1991; Beatified: November 9, 1997 by Pope John Paul II
	José Trinidad Rangél Montaño	4 June 1887; Dolores Hidalgo, Guanajuato, Mexico	25 April 1927; Rancho de San Joaquín, Guanajuato, Mexico	Priest of the Archdiocese of León; Martyr
	José Trinidad Rangél Montaño	4 June 1887; Dolores Hidalgo, Guanajuato, Mexico	25 April 1927; Rancho de San Joaquín, Guanajuato, Mexico	Introduction of Cause: N/A; Declared "Venerable": June 22, 2004; Beatified: November 20, 2005 by Cardinal José Saraiva Martins, C.M.F.
	Andrés Solá Molist	7 October 1895; Taradell, Barcelona, Spain	25 April 1927; Rancho de San Joaquín, Guanajuato, Mexico	Professed Priest of the Claretians; Martyr
	Andrés Solá Molist	7 October 1895; Taradell, Barcelona, Spain	25 April 1927; Rancho de San Joaquín, Guanajuato, Mexico	Introduction of Cause: N/A; Declared "Venerable": June 22, 2004; Beatified: November 20, 2005 by Cardinal José Saraiva Martins, C.M.F.
	Leonardo Pérez Larios	28 November 1883; Lagos de Moreno, Jalisco, Mexico	25 April 1927; Rancho de San Joaquín, Guanajuato, Mexico	Layperson of the Archdiocese of León; Martyr
	Leonardo Pérez Larios	28 November 1883; Lagos de Moreno, Jalisco, Mexico	25 April 1927; Rancho de San Joaquín, Guanajuato, Mexico	Introduction of Cause: N/A; Declared "Venerable": June 22, 2004; Beatified: November 20, 2005 by Cardinal José Saraiva Martins, C.M.F.
	Darío Acosta Zurita	14 December 1908; Naolinco, Veracruz, Mexico	25 July 1931; Veracruz, Veracruz, Mexico	Priest of the Diocese of Veracruz; Martyr
	Darío Acosta Zurita	14 December 1908; Naolinco, Veracruz, Mexico	25 July 1931; Veracruz, Veracruz, Mexico	Introduction of Cause: N/A; Declared "Venerable": June 22, 2004; Beatified: November 20, 2005 by Cardinal José Saraiva Martins, C.M.F.
	Juan de Palafox y Mendoza	24 June 1600; Fitero, Navarre, Spain	1 October 1659; Osma, Soria, Spain	Bishop of Puebla de los Ángeles and Osma
	Juan de Palafox y Mendoza	24 June 1600; Fitero, Navarre, Spain	1 October 1659; Osma, Soria, Spain	Introduction of Cause: N/A; Declared "Venerable": January 17, 2009; Beatified: June 5, 2011 by Cardinal Angelo Amato, S.D.B.
	Manuela de Jesús Arias Espinosa (rel. name: María Inés Teresa of the Blessed Sacrament)	7 July 1904; Ixtlán del Río, Nayarit, Mexico	22 July 1981; Rome, Italy	Founder of the Poor Clare Missionary Sisters of the Blessed Sacrament and the Missionaries of Christ for the Universal Church
	Manuela de Jesús Arias Espinosa (rel. name: María Inés Teresa of the Blessed Sacrament)	7 July 1904; Ixtlán del Río, Nayarit, Mexico	22 July 1981; Rome, Italy	Introduction of Cause: N/A; Declared "Venerable": April 3, 2009; Beatified: April 21, 2012 by Cardinal Angelo Amato, S.D.B.
	María Concepcíon Cabrera Arias de Armida	8 December 1862; San Luis Potosí, San Luis Potosí, Mexico	3 March 1937; Mexico City, Mexico	Married Laywoman of the Archdiocese of Mexico; Founder of the Apostolate of the Cross and the Religious of the Cross of the Sacred Heart of Jesus; Cofounder of the Missionaries of the Holy Spirit
	María Concepcíon Cabrera Arias de Armida	8 December 1862; San Luis Potosí, San Luis Potosí, Mexico	3 March 1937; Mexico City, Mexico	Introduction of Cause: N/A; Declared "Venerable": December 20, 1999; Beatified: May 4, 2019 by Cardinal Giovanni Angelo Becciu
	Moisés Lira Serafín	16 September 1893; Tlatempa, Puebla, Mexico	25 June 1950; Mexico City, Mexico	Professed Priest of the Missionaries of the Holy Spirit; Founder of the Missionaries of Charity of Mary Immaculate
	Moisés Lira Serafín	16 September 1893; Tlatempa, Puebla, Mexico	25 June 1950; Mexico City, Mexico	Introduction of Cause: N/A; Declared "Venerable": March 27, 2013; Beatified: September 14, 2024 by Cardinal Marcello Semeraro

=== Group martyrs ===
Image	Name	Born	Died	Church Status
As the 205 Martyrs of Japan (1627-1632)
	Bartolomé Díaz Laurel	1599; Acapulco, Guerrero, Mexico	16 August 1627; Nagasaki, Japan	Professed Religious of the Franciscan Friars Minor; Martyr
	Bartolomé Gutiérrez Rodríguez	1580; Mexico City, Mexico	3 September 1632; Nishizaka, Nagasaki, Japan	Professed Priest of the Augustinians; Martyr
		Introduction of Cause: N/A; Declared "Venerable": February 26, 1866; Beatified: July 7, 1867 by Pope Pius IX		
Martyrs of Cajonos (1700)
	Juan Bautista	c. 1660; San Francisco Cajonos, Oaxaca, Mexico	16 September 1700; San Francisco Cajonos, Oaxaca, Mexico	Married Layperson of the Diocese of Antequera-Oaxaca; Martyr
	Jacinto de los Ángeles	c. 1660; San Francisco Cajonos, Oaxaca, Mexico	16 September 1700; San Francisco Cajonos, Oaxaca, Mexico	Married Layperson of the Diocese of Antequera-Oaxaca; Martyr
		Introduction of Cause: N/A; Declared "Venerable": July 7, 2001; Beatified: August 1, 2002 by Pope John Paul II		
Martyrs of Guadalajara (1927-1928)
	José Anacleto González Flores	13 July 1888; Tepatitlán, Jalisco, Mexico	1 April 1927; Guadalajara, Jalisco, Mexico	Married Layperson of the Archdiocese of Guadalajara; Martyr
	José Dionisio Luis Padilla Gómez	9 December 1899; Guadalajara, Jalisco, Mexico	1 April 1927; Guadalajara, Jalisco, Mexico	Layperson of the Archdiocese of Guadalajara; Martyr
	Jorge Ramón Vargas González	28 September 1899; Ahualulco, Jalisco, Mexico	1 April 1927; Guadalajara, Jalisco, Mexico	Layperson of the Archdiocese of Guadalajara; Martyr
	Ramón Vicente Vargas González	22 January 1905; Ahualulco, Jalisco, Mexico	1 April 1927; Guadalajara, Jalisco, Mexico	Layperson of the Archdiocese of Guadalajara; Martyr
	José Luciano Ezequiel Huerta Gutiérrez	6 January 1876; Magdalena, Jalisco, Mexico	3 April 1927; Mezquitán, Jalisco, Mexico	Married Layperson of the Archdiocese of Guadalajara; Martyr
	Salvador Huerta Gutiérrez	18 March 1880; Magdalena, Jalisco, Mexico	3 April 1927; Mezquitán, Jalisco, Mexico	Married Layperson of the Archdiocese of Guadalajara; Martyr
	Miguel Gómez Loza	11 August 1888; El Refugio, Jalisco, Mexico	21 March 1928; Atotonilco, Jalisco, Mexico	Married Layperson of the Archdiocese of Guadalajara; Martyr
	Luis Magaña Servín	24 August 1902; Arandas, Jalisco, Mexico	9 February 1928; Arandas, Jalisco, Mexico	Married Layperson of the Archdiocese of Guadalajara; Martyr
		Introduction of Cause: N/A; Declared "Venerable": June 22, 2004; Beatified: November 20, 2005 by Cardinal José Saraiva Martins		
As the 498 Spanish Martyrs (1936)
	Gabriel Escoto Ruiz (rel. name: José María)	18 August 1878; Atotonilco el Alto, Jalisco, Mexico	29 July 1936; Clot dels Aubens, Cervera, Lleida, Spain	Novice of the Carmelites of the Ancient Observance; Martyr
	Luciano Hernández Ramírez (rel. name: Reginaldo)	7 January 1909; San Miguel el Alto, Jalisco, Mexico	13 August 1936; Nishizaka, Madrid, Spain	Professed Priest of the Dominicans; Martyr
		Introduction of Cause: N/A; Declared "Venerable": June 26, 2006; Beatified: October 28, 2007 by Cardinal José Saraiva Martins, C.M.F.		

== Mexican venerables ==
- Antonio Margil Ros (Antonio of Jesus) (1657–1726), Professed Priest of the Franciscan Friars Minor (Valencia, Spain – Mexico City, Mexico)
  - Declared "Venerable": 31 July 1836
- Leonardo Castellanos y Castellanos (1862–1912), Bishop of Tabasco (Michoacán de Ocampo – Tabasco, Mexico)
  - Declared "Venerable": 21 December 1989
- José Ramón Ibarra González (1853–1917), Archbishop of Puebla de los Ángeles (Guerrero – Mexico City, Mexico)
  - Declared "Venerable": 9 April 1990
- Dolores Medina Zepeda (María Dolores of the Wound on the Side of Christ) (1860–1925), Founder of the Daughters of the Passion of Jesus Christ and the Sorrows of Mary (Mexico City – Mexíco Distrito Federál, Mexico)
  - Declared "Venerable": 3 July 1998
- Pablo de Anda Padilla (1830–1904), Priest of the Diocese of León; Founder of the Minim Daughters of Mary Immaculate (Jalisco – Guanajuato, Mexico)
  - Declared "Venerable": 28 June 1999
- María Luisa de la Peña Navarro de Rojas (María Luisa Josefa [Luisita] of the Most Blessed Sacrament) (1866–1937), Widow; Founder of the Carmelite Sisters of the Sacred Heart of Guadalajara and the Carmelite Sisters of the Sacred Heart of Los Angeles (Jalisco, Mexico)
  - Declared "Venerable": 1 July 2000
- Benôit-Félix Rougier Olanier (1859–1938), Priest and Founder of the Missionaries of the Holy Spirit; Founder of the Guadalupan Missionary Sisters of the Holy Spirit and the Oblate Sisters of Jesus the Priest; Cofounder of the Daughters of the Holy Spirit (Puy-de-Dôme, France – Mexico City, Mexico)
  - Declared "Venerable": 1 July 2000
- Librada Orozco Santa Cruz (María Librada of the Sacred Heart of Jesus) (1834–1926), Founder of the Franciscan Sisters of Our Lady of Refuge (Jalisco, Mexico)
  - Declared "Venerable": 18 December 2000
- Julia Navarrete Guerrero (Julia of the Thorns of the Sacred Heart) (1881–1974), Founder of the Missionary Daughters of the Most Pure Virgin Mary (Oaxaca – Estado de Mexíco, Mexico)
  - Declared "Venerable": 22 June 2004
- Jean Prosper Fromental (Bernardo Felipe) (1895–1978), Professed Religious of the Brothers of the Christian Schools (De La Salle Brothers); Founder of the Guadalupan Sisters of De La Salle (Lozère, France – Mexico City, Mexico)
  - Declared "Venerable": 5 July 2013
- Jesús María Echavarría Aguirre (1858–1954), Bishop of Saltillo; Founder of the Institute of Sisters Catechists of Guadalupe (Guadalupan Catechist Sisters) (Sinaloa – Coahuila, Mexico)
  - Declared "Venerable": 7 February 2014
- Agustín Ramírez Barba (1881–1967), Priest of the Diocese of San Juan de los Lagos; Founder of the Servants of the Lord of Mercy (Jalisco, Mexico)
  - Declared "Venerable": 16 July 2015
- María de Jesús Guízar Barragán (María of the Merciful Love of Jesus) (1899–1973), Founder of the Guadalupan Handmaids of Christ the Priest (Michoacán – Estado de Mexíco, Mexico)
  - Declared "Venerable": 14 June 2016
- José Bardomiano de Jesús Guzmán Figueroa (Pablo María) (1897–1967), Professed Priest of the Missionaries of the Holy Spirit; Founder of the Eucharistic Missionaries of the Most Holy Trinity (Guanajuato – Mexico City, Mexico)
  - Declared "Venerable": 14 June 2016
- María Patricia Magdalena Pátlan Sánchez (Humilde of the Child Jesus) (1895–1970), Professed Religious of the Franciscan Sisters of the Immaculate Conception (Guanajuato, Mexico – Veracruz, Mexico)
  - Declared "Venerable": 16 June 2017
- Eusebio Francisco Kino (1645–1711), Professed Priest of the Jesuits (Trent, Italy – Sonora, Mexico)
  - Declared "Venerable": 10 July 2020
- Vasco de Quiroga (1470–1565), Bishop of Michoacán (Ávila, Spain – Michoacán, Mexico)
  - Declared "Venerable": 21 December 2020

== Mexican Servants of God ==
- Bartolomé de las Casas (1484–1566), Professed Priest of the Dominicans; Bishop of Chiapas (Seville – Madrid, Spain)
- Juan Bautista de Moya Valenzuela (1504–1567), Professed Priest of the Augustinians (Jaén, Spain – Michoacán, Mexico)
- Juana Inés de Asbaje Ramírez de Santillana (Juana Inés of the Cross) (1648–1695), Professed Religious of the Hieronymite Nuns (Estado de México – Mexico City, Mexico)
- Luis Felipe Neri de Alfaro Velásquez (1709–1776), Priest of the Oratorians (Mexico City – Guanajuato, Mexico)
- Antonio Alcalde Barriga (1701–1792), Professed Priest of the Dominicans; Bishop of Guadalajara (Valladolid, Spain – Jalisco, Mexico)
- Cesárea Ruiz de Esparza Dávalos (1829–1884), Founder of the Sisters of Saint Joseph of Mexico (Josephite Sisters) (Aguascalientes, Mexico – Mexico City, Mexico)
- José Antonio Plancarte Labastida (1840–1898), Priest of the Archdiocese of Mexico; Founder of the Daughters of Mary Immaculate of Guadalupe (Mexico City, Mexico)
- José Anastasio Díaz López (1858–1905), Priest of the Diocese of Zacatecas; Founder of the Daughters of the Sacred Heart of Jesus and Our Lady of Guadalupe (Aguascalientes, Mexico – Zacatecas, Mexico)
- Miguel Cano Gutiérrez (1866–1924), Priest of the Archdiocese of Guadalajara; Founder of the Servants of the Holy Trinity and the Poor (Jalisco, Mexico)
- Eugenio Oláez Anda (1860–1933), Priest of the Diocese of León; Founder of the Daughters of the Sacred Heart of Jesus (Guanajuato, Mexico)
- Martín Lawers González (1881–1933), Priest of the Diocese of Irapuato; Martyr
- Ramón Sáinz Orozco (1882–1937), Married Layperson of the Diocese of San Juan de los Lagos; Martyr
- María de la Luz Elisa Berruecos Juvera (María Elisa Margarita of the Holy Spirit) (1874–1944), Founder of the Sisters of the Sacred Heart of Jesus (Querétaro – Mexico City, Mexico)
- María Eugenia González Lafón (María Eugenia of the Holy Trinity) (1876–1962), Founder of the Catechist Sisters of Mary Most Holy, Order of Saint Benedict (Chihuahua – Querétaro, Mexico)
- Alfonso Pérez Larios (1886–1965), Professed Religious of the Missionaries of the Holy Spirit (Jalisco – Mexico City, Mexico)
- María Dolores Echevarría Esparza (1893–1966), Cofounder of the Missionaries of Jesus the Priest (Jalisco – Mexico City, Mexico)
- Gloria Esperanza Elizondo García (Gloría Maria of Jesus) (1908–1966), Professed Religious of the Catechist Sisters of the Poor (Durango – Nueva León, Mexico)
- María Regina Sánchez Muñoz (1895–1967), Founder of the Missionaries of the Sacred Heart of Jesus and Our Lady of Guadalupe (Guadalajara – Chihuahua, Mexico)
- José Soledad de Jesús Torres Castañeda (1918–1967), Bishop of Ciudad Obregón; Martyr (Zacatecas – Durango, Mexico)
- Roberto Cuellar García (1896–1970), Professed Priest of the Jesuits (Durango – Jalisco, Mexico)
- Antonio Hernández Gallegos (1912–1973), Bishop of Tabasco (Zacatecas – San Luis Potosí, Mexico)
- Rebeca María de Uriarte Healy (María Auxilia of the Cross) (1891–1974), Founder of the Oblate Sisters of the Blessed Sacrament (Puebla – Mexico City, Mexico)
- Martha Christlieb Ibarrola (1914–1975), Cofounder of the Sisters of the True Cross, Daughters of the Church (Mexico City – Veracruz, Mexico)
- Juan Pablo Góngora Alvarado (1894–1986), Priest of the Archdiocese of Yucatán; Founder of the Missionary Daughters of the Holy Mother of Light (Yucatán, Mexico)
- María Concepcíon Álvarez Icaza (María Angélica) (1887–1977), Professed Religious of the Visitation Nuns (Mexico City, Mexico)
- Maura Degollado Guízar de Maciel (1895–1977), Married Layperson of the Diocese of Tlalnepantla (Michoacán de Ocampo – Mexico City, Mexico)
- Juan María Navarrete Guerrero (1886–1982), Archbishop of Hermosillo (Oaxaca – Sonora, Mexico)
- José Abraham Martínez Betancourt (1903–1982), Bishop of Tacámbaro; Founder of the Servants of the Immaculate Conception (Michoacán, Mexico)
- Carlos Rosado Contraros (1926–1984), Priest of the Archdiocese of Yucatán (Yucatán, Mexico)
- José Ochoa Gutierrez (1909–1984), Priest of the Diocese of Zamora; Founder of the Missionaries of the Holy Family and the Parochial Workers of the Holy Family (Michoacán de Ocampo, Mexico)
- Vincenzo Idà (1909–1984), Priest of the Diocese of Oppido Mamertina-Palmi; Founder of the Missionary Sisters of the Catechism and the Missionaries of Evangelization (Vibo Valentia, Italy – Oaxaca, Mexico)
- Ana María Gómez Campos (Ana María of the Holy Spirit) (1894–1985), Cofounder of the Daughters of the Holy Spirit (Mexico City, Mexico)
- María Cristina Olimpia Macotela Durán (Margarita María) (1933–1985), Professed Religious of the Capuchin Poor Clares of the Blessed Sacrament (Mexico City – Puebla, Mexico)
- José del Pilar Quezada Valdés (1900–1985), Bishop of Acapulco (Jalisco, Mexico)
- Virginia Padilla Jiménez (1901–1986), Founder of the Missionary Sisters of Our Lady of Sorrows, Reparatrices of Her Sorrows (Jalisco – Mexico City, Mexico) (non-cause)
- Marina Francisca Cinta Sarrelangue de Balmori (1909–1988), Married Layperson of the Diocese of Coatzacoalcos (Veracruz – Mexico City, Mexico)
- María del Carmen López Guzmán (María Yolanda of Our Lady of Guadalupe) (1942–1991), Professed Religious of the Servants of the Holy Trinity and the Poor (Jalisco, Mexico)
- Federico de Aguinaga López (1904–1995), Layperson of the Archdiocese of Guadalajara (Jalisco, Mexico)
- Saturnino García Lara (1903–1995), Priest of the Archdiocese of Morelia (Guanajuato – Michoacán, Mexico)
- Basilio Rueda Guzmán (1924–1996), Professed Religious of the Marist Brothers of the Schools (Jalisco, Mexico)
- Salvador Rivera García (Salvador of the Immaculate Heart of Mary) (1934–1997), Professed Priest of the Discalced Carmelites (Guanajuato – Jalisco, Mexico)
- Antonietta Böhm Schwanewilm (1907–2008), Professed Religious of the Daughters of Mary, Help of Christians (Salesian Sisters) (Bottrop, Germany – Estado de Mexíco, Mexico)
- Adalberto Almeida Merino (1916–2008), Archbishop of Chihuáhua (Chihuáhua, Mexico)
- Ignacio Larrañaga Orbegozo (Jesús María of Azpeitia) (1928–2013), Professed Priest of the Capuchins; Founder of the Prayer and Life Workshops (Azpeitia, Spain – Guadalajara, Mexico)

== Group Martyrs ==
- Martyrs of Tepehuanes (Durango, Mexico):
  - Fernando de Tobar (1581–1616), Professed Priest of the Jesuits; Martyr (Sinaloa, Mexico)
  - Bernardo de Cisneros (1582–1616), Professed Priest of the Jesuits; Martyr (Palencia, Spain)
  - Diego de Orozco (1588–1616), Professed Priest of the Jesuits; Martyr (Cáceres, Spain)
  - Juan del Valle (1575–1616), Professed Priest of the Jesuits; Martyr (Vizcaya, Spain)
  - Luis de Alavés (1589–1616), Professed Priest of the Jesuits; Martyr (Oaxaca, Mexico)
  - Juan Fonte (1574–1616), Professed Priest of the Jesuits; Martyr (Barcelona, Spain)
  - Jeronimo de Moranta (1574–1616), Professed Priest of the Jesuits; Martyr (Islas Baleares, Spain)
  - Fernando de Santarén (1567–1616), Professed Priest of the Jesuits; Martyr (Cuenca, Spain)
- Martyrs of the Mexican Republic:
  - Inocencio López Velarde Morán (1860–1914), Priest of the Diocese of Zacatecas (Jalisco – Zacatecas, Mexico)
  - Pascual Vega Alvarado (1851–1914), Priest of the Diocese of Zacatecas (Zacatecas, Mexico)
  - Charles-Alphonse Astruc (Adrian María) (1860–1914), Professed Religious of the Brothers of the Christian Schools (De La Salle Brothers) (Lozère, France – Zacatecas, Mexico)
  - Jean-François-Théophile Gilles (Adolfo Francisco) (1869–1914), Professed Religious of the Brothers of the Christian Schools (De La Salle Brothers) (Lozère, France – Zacatecas, Mexico)
  - Mariano Bermúdez González (1888–1914), Professed Religious of the Claretians (Zacatecas, Mexico)
  - Miguel Pérez Rubio (1863–1914), Priest of the Archdiocese of Guadalajara (Jalisco, Mexico)
  - Andrés Avelino Flores Quesney (1880–1915), Priest of the Diocese of Ciudad Obregon (Sonora, Mexico)
  - Crescenciano Aguilar Zúñiga (1877–1925), Priest of the Archdiocese of Guadalajara (Jalisco – Zacatecas, Mexico)
  - José García Farfán (1877–1926), Married Layperson of the Archdiocese of Puebla (Tlaxcala – Puebla, Mexico)
  - Joaquín de Silva Carrasco (1898–1926), Young Layperson of the Archdiocese of Mexico City (Guanajuato – Michoacán, Mexico)
  - Manuel Melgarejo Nápoles (1908–1926), Young Layperson of the Archdiocese of Mexico City (Mexico City – Michoacán, Mexico)
  - José Vargas Reyes (d. 1926), Layperson of the Archdiocese of Morelia (Michoacán, Mexico)
  - José Natividad Herrero Delgado (1911–1926), Child of the Diocese of San Juan de los Lagos (Jalisco, Mexico)
  - Juan Manuel Bonilla Manzano (1904–1927), Young Layperson of the Archdiocese of Mexico City (Mexico City – Estado de México, Mexico)
  - Florentino Alvarez Medina (1890–1927), Married Layperson of the Archdiocese of León (Guanajuato, Mexico)
  - Tomás de la Mora (1909–1927), Priest of the Diocese of Colima (Colima, Mexico)
  - Pablo García Fernández (1876–1927), Priest of the Archdiocese of Guadalajara (Jalisco, Mexico)
  - María del Carmen Robles Ibarra (1890–1928), Layperson of the Diocese of Zacatecas (Zacatecas – Jalisco, Mexico)
  - Antonio Méndez Padrón (1887–1928), Priest of the Archdiocese of San Luis Potosí (San Luis Potosí, Mexico)
  - Emilio Pérez Michel (1876–1928), Priest of the Diocese of Autlán (Jalisco, Mexico)
  - Salvador Gutiérrez de Mora (1904–1928), Layperson of the Archdiocese of Mexico City (Mexico City – Guerrero, Mexico)
  - José de Jesús Mora Salado (1886–1928), Priest of the Diocese of Ciudad Guzmán (Michoacán, Mexico)
  - Ramón Parada López (1896–1928), Married Layperson of the Archdiocese of Guadalajara (Jalisco, Mexico)
  - Zenaida Llerenas Torres (1913–1928), Young Layperson of the Diocese of Colima (Colima, Mexico)
  - David Maduro Vertiz (1885–1929), Professed Priest of the Jesuits (Estado de México – Coahuila, Mexico)
  - Gabriel Ángel García Morales (1906–1930), Young Layperson of the Diocese of Tabasco (Tabasco – Chiapas, Mexico)
  - Francisco Marmolejo (1895–1931), Married Layperson of the Diocese of Aguascalientes (Jalisco, Mexico)
  - Adolfo Mota Pineda (1885–1932), Priest of the Diocese of Colima (Colima – Jalisco, Mexico)
  - Leonor Sánchez López (1918–1937), Young Layperson of the Diocese of Orizaba (Veracruz, Mexico)

== Mexican candidates for sainthood ==
- Martín de Valencia (1474–1534), Professed Priest of the Franciscan Friars Minor (Valencia de Don Juan, Spain – Tlalmanalco, Mexico)
- Juan de Zumárraga (1468–1548), Professed Priest of the Franciscan Friars Minor; Bishop of Mexico City (Biscay, Spain – Mexico City, Mexico)
- Gregorio López (1542–1596), Layperson of the Archdiocese of Mexico City; Hermit (Madrid, Spain – Mexico City, Mexico)
- Pedro de Agurto (1544–1608), Professed Priest of the Augustinians; Bishop of Cebu (Mexico City, Mexico – Cebu, Philippines)
- Diego Bazan (d. 1672), Layperson of the Archdiocese of Mexico City; Martyr (Mexico – Tumon, Guam)
- Francisco Hermenegildo Tomás Garcés (1738–1781), Professed Priest of the Franciscan Friars Minor (Zaragoza, Spain – Sonora, Mexico)
- Luigi Corsini (1928–1963), Professed Priest of the Comboni Missionaries of the Heart of Jesus; Martyr (Brescia, Italy – Baja California Sur, Mexico)
- Rodolfo Aguilar Álvarez (1948–1977), Priest of the Archdiocese of Chihuahua (Mexico City, Mexico – Chihuahua, Mexico)
- Juan Morán Samaniego (1943–1979), Priest of the Diocese of Altacomulco; Martyr (Estado de México, Mexico)
- María Concepción Zúñiga López (María Concepción of the Nativity and the Perpetual Help of Mary) (1914–1979), Founder of the Franciscan Minim Sisters of the Atonement of the Perpetual Help of Mary and the Franciscan Minim Friars of the Atonement of the Perpetual Help of Mary (Jalisco, Mexico – Jalisco, Mexico)
- Luz Marina Valencia Triviño (1952–1987), Professed Religious of the Missionaries of the Immaculate Conception (Cundinamarca, Colombia – Guerrero, Mexico)
- Carlos Abascal (1949–2008), Layperson of the Archdiocese of Mexico City (Mexico City)
- Juan Miguel Contreras García (1985–2018), Priest of the Archdiocese of Guadalajara; Martyr (Jalisco, Mexico)

== See also ==
- History of Roman Catholicism in Mexico
- Roman Catholicism in Mexico
- List of American saints and beatified people
- List of Argentine saints
- List of Brazilian saints
- List of Canadian Roman Catholic saints
- List of Central American and Caribbean Saints
- List of saints of the Canary Islands
- List of Scandinavian saints
