= 4th federal electoral district of Jalisco =

Federal electoral district of Mexico

Jalisco's 4th
- Electoral district of the Chamber of Deputies of Mexico

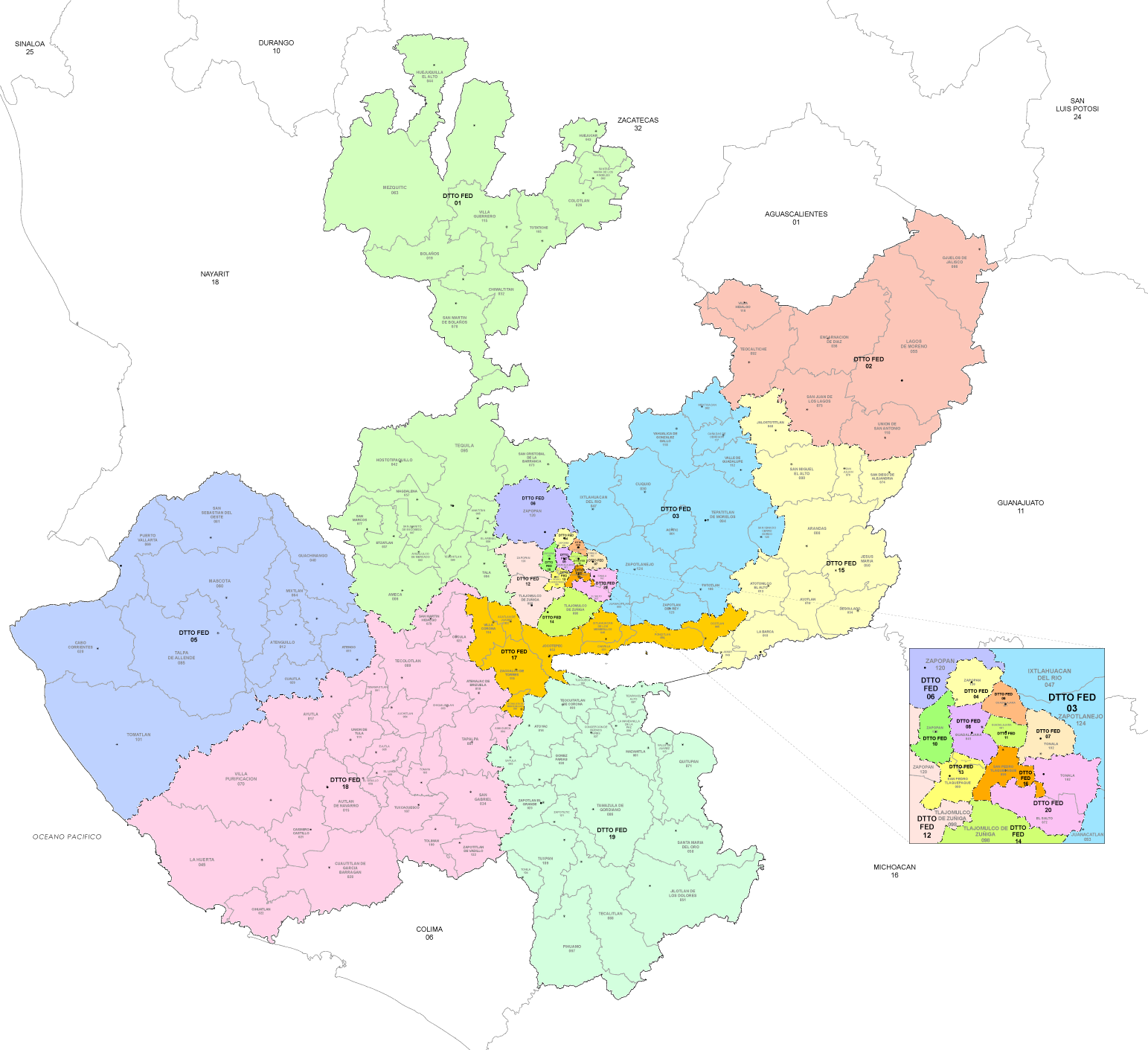
- 4th district

Incumbent
- Member: Raúl Álvarez Villaseñor
- Party: ▌Morena
- Congress: 66th (2024–2027)

District
- State: Jalisco
- Head town: Zapopan
- Coordinates: 20°43′N 103°23′W
- Covers: Municipality of Zapopan (part)
- PR region: First
- Precincts: 144
- Population: 441,436 (2020 census)

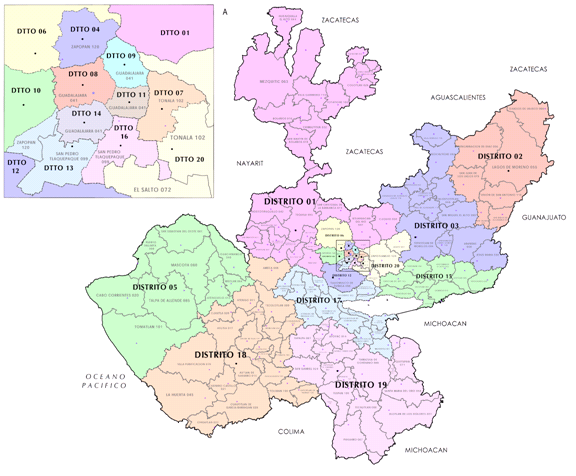
Jalisco's districts in 2017–2022

The 4th federal electoral district of Jalisco (Spanish: Distrito electoral federal 04 de Jalisco) is one of the 300 electoral districts into which Mexico is divided for elections to the federal Chamber of Deputies and one of 20 such districts in the state of Jalisco.

It elects one deputy to the lower house of Congress for each three-year legislative session by means of the first-past-the-post system. Votes cast in the district also count towards the calculation of proportional representation ("plurinominal") deputies elected from the first region.

The current member for the district, elected in the 2024 general election, is Raúl Álvarez Villaseñor. Originally elected for the Ecologist Green Party of Mexico (PVEM), he switched allegiance to the National Regeneration Movement (Morena) at the start of the congressional session.

== District territory ==
Under the 2023 districting plan adopted by the National Electoral Institute (INE), which is to be used for the 2024, 2027 and 2030 federal elections, Jalisco's 4th district is located in the Guadalajara Metropolitan Area and comprises 144 electoral precincts (secciones electorales) across the municipality of Zapopan. (Note: The 6th, 10th and 12th districts cover the remainder of the municipality.)

The head town (cabecera distrital), where results from individual polling stations are gathered together and tallied, is the city of Zapopan. The district reported a population of 441,436 in the 2020 census.

== Previous districting schemes ==
Evolution of electoral district numbers
	1974	1978	1996	2005	2017	2023
Jalisco	13	20	19	19	20	20
Chamber of Deputies	196	300				

2017–2022

Jalisco regained its 20th congressional seat in the 2017 redistricting process. The 4th district covered 119 precincts in the municipality of Zapopan.

2005–2017

Under the 2005 plan, Jalisco had 19 districts. The 4th district comprised 107 precincts in the municipality of Zapopan.

1996–2005

In the 1996 scheme, under which Jalisco lost a single-member seat, the district had its head town at Zapopan and it covered a part of that municipality, together with the municipalities of Cuquío, Ixtlahuacán del Río and San Cristóbal de la Barranca.

1978–1996

The districting scheme in force from 1978 to 1996 was the result of the 1977 electoral reforms, which increased the number of single-member seats in the Chamber of Deputies from 196 to 300. Under that plan, Jalisco's seat allocation rose from 13 to 20. The 4th district covered a part of the sector Reforma in the state capital, Guadalajara.

== Deputies returned to Congress ==
(Mexico) National parties
- Current
- PAN
- PRI
- PT
- PVEM
- MC
- Morena
- PAZ
- Somos
- Defunct or local only
- PLM
- PNR
- PRM
- PNM
- PP
- PPS
- PARM
- PFCRN
- CON
- PANAL
- PSD
- PES
- PES
- PRD

Jalisco's 4th district
Election	Deputy	Party	Term	Legislature
1916	Manuel Dávalos Ornelas		1916–1917	Constituent Congress of Querétaro
...
1976	Porfirio Cortés Silva	Institutional Revolutionary Party	1976–1979	50th Congress
1979	Octavio Rafael Bueno Trujillo	Institutional Revolutionary Party	1979–1982	51st Congress
1982	María del Carmen Mercado Chávez	Institutional Revolutionary Party	1982–1985	52nd Congress
1985	Porfirio Cortés Silva	Institutional Revolutionary Party	1985–1988	53rd Congress
1988	Alfredo Oropeza García	National Action Party (Mexico)	1988–1991	54th Congress
1991	José Alberto Cortés García	Institutional Revolutionary Party	1991–1994	55th Congress
1994	José Pedro Sánchez Ascencio	Institutional Revolutionary Party	1994–1997	56th Congress
1997	Juan Ignacio Fuentes Larios	National Action Party (Mexico)	1997–2000	57th Congress
2000	Enrique Adolfo Villa Preciado	National Action Party (Mexico)	2000–2003	58th Congress
2003	Hugo Rodríguez Díaz	Institutional Revolutionary Party	2003–2006	59th Congress
2006	Jorge Quintero Bello	National Action Party (Mexico)	2006–2009	60th Congress
2009	Arturo Zamora Jiménez	Institutional Revolutionary Party	2009–2012	61st Congress
2012	Salvador Arellano Guzmán	Institutional Revolutionary Party	2012–2015	62nd Congress
2015	Laura Valeria Guzmán Vázquez	Institutional Revolutionary Party	2015–2018	63rd Congress
2018	Mario Alberto Rodríguez Carrillo	Citizens' Movement (Mexico)	2018–2021	64th Congress
2021	Taygete Irisay Rodríguez González	Citizens' Movement (Mexico)	2021–2024	65th Congress
2024	Raúl Álvarez Villaseñor (Note: Álvarez Villaseñor was originally elected for the PVEM but switched allegiance to Morena at the start of the congressional session.)	Ecologist Green Party of Mexico National Regeneration Movement	2024–2027	66th Congress

== Presidential elections ==
Jalisco's 4th district
Election	District won by	Party or coalition	%
2018	Andrés Manuel López Obrador	Juntos Haremos Historia	42.4482
2024	Claudia Sheinbaum Pardo	Sigamos Haciendo Historia	41.7154
