= Toribio Romo =

Mexican Catholic priest, martyr and saint (1900–1928)

Saint Toribio Romo
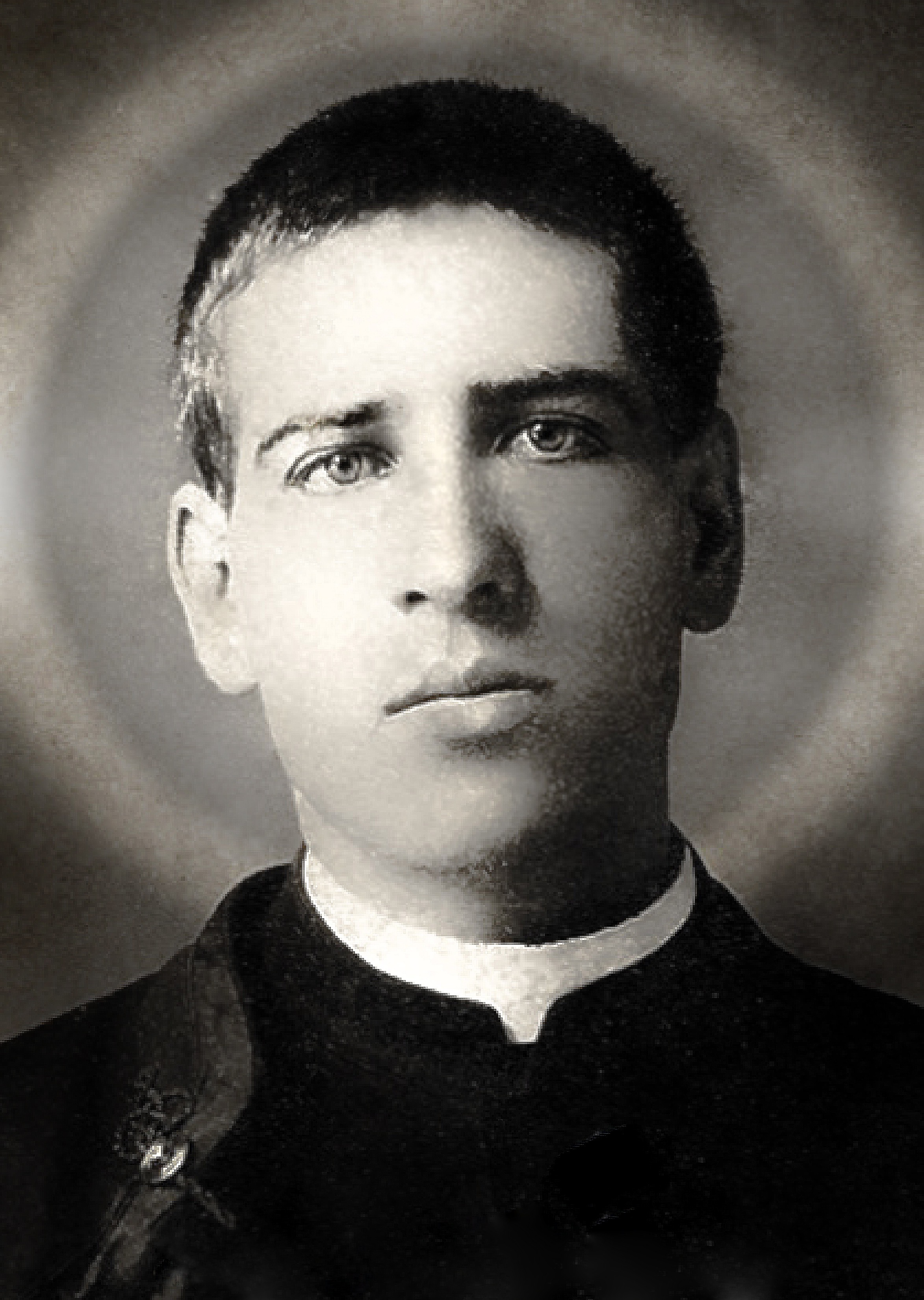

Martyr
- Born: Toribio Romo González; April 16, 1900; Santa Ana de Guadalupe, Jalostotitlán, Jalisco, Mexico
- Died: February 25, 1928 (aged 27); Agua Caliente, Santiago de Tequila, Jalisco, Mexico
- Venerated in: Catholic Church
- Beatified: November 22, 1992, St. Peter's Square, Vatican City by Pope John Paul II
- Canonized: May 21, 2000, St. Peter's Square, Vatican City by Pope John Paul II
- Major shrine: Santa Ana de Guadalupe, Jalisco, Mexico
- Feast: May 21 (along with the other Saints of the Cristero War)
- Patronage: Migrants

Toribio Romo González, known as Saint Toribio Romo (Spanish: santo Toribio Romo, Spanish pronunciation: [ˌsanto toˈɾiβjo ˈromo]; April 16, 1900 – February 25, 1928) was a Mexican Catholic priest and martyr who was killed during the anti-clerical persecutions of the Cristero War. Beatified and later canonized by Pope John Paul II along with 24 other saints and martyrs of the Cristero War, he is popularly venerated in Mexico and among Mexican immigrants, particularly for his reported miraculous appearances to migrants seeking to cross the Mexico–United States border.

== Life ==
Toribio was born on April 16, 1900, to farmers Juana González Romo and Patricio Romo Pérez in the ranchería of Santa Ana de Guadalupe, located about 11 kilometres (6.8 mi) from the municipal seat of Jalostotitlán, Jalisco. He had two siblings: a sister, María, and a younger brother, Román, who would also go on to become a priest.

Though initially countered by his parents, in 1912, at age thirteen, he entered the Auxiliary Seminary of San Juan de los Lagos, before transferring to the Major Diocesan Seminary of Guadalajara in 1920. He was created a deacon on September 22, 1922, and ordained a priest a few months later, on December 23, at the age of twenty-two, after being granted a dispensation due to his exceedingly young age. He celebrated his first public mass on January 5, 1923.

Toribio's ministry was characterized by a heavy emphasis on catechesis to the poor, as well as the centrality of the Eucharist to Christian life. During his brief priesthood, he served in parishes in the towns of Sayula, Tuxpan, Yahualica and Cuquío, all of them in his native state of Jalisco.

Starting in November 1926, after a revolt in the town of Cuquío against the anti-clerical persecutions of Mexican president Plutarco Elías Calles, he was forced to take up an itinerant lifestyle along with Justino Orona, the parish priest of Cuquío. After relocating almost a dozen times, his final residence was the rural settlement of Agua Caliente, in the outskirts of the town of Tequila, where he was sent to hide and was offered refuge by a local landowner. There, he was joined by his brother and sister, and he continued to secretly carry out his priestly ministry from an abandoned distillery and by visiting parishioners in the town of Tequila by night.

Toribio is a direct male-line descendent of 17th century explorer Diego Romo de Vivar.

== Death ==
On Friday, February 24, 1928, he spent his day organizing the parish registry. Two days before he had sent his brother away to safety. Toribio finished his work in the early hours of February 25 and went to bed. An hour later, government troops arrived and broke into the bedroom where he was sleeping. One of the soldiers reportedly shouted: "Here is the priest, kill him!" He said, "Here I am, but do not kill me."

Another soldier, however, fired, and Toribio rose from his bed and took a few steps before a second bullet caused him to fall into the arms of his sister, who cried in a loud voice: "Courage, Father Toribio...merciful Christ, receive him! Long live Christ the King!"

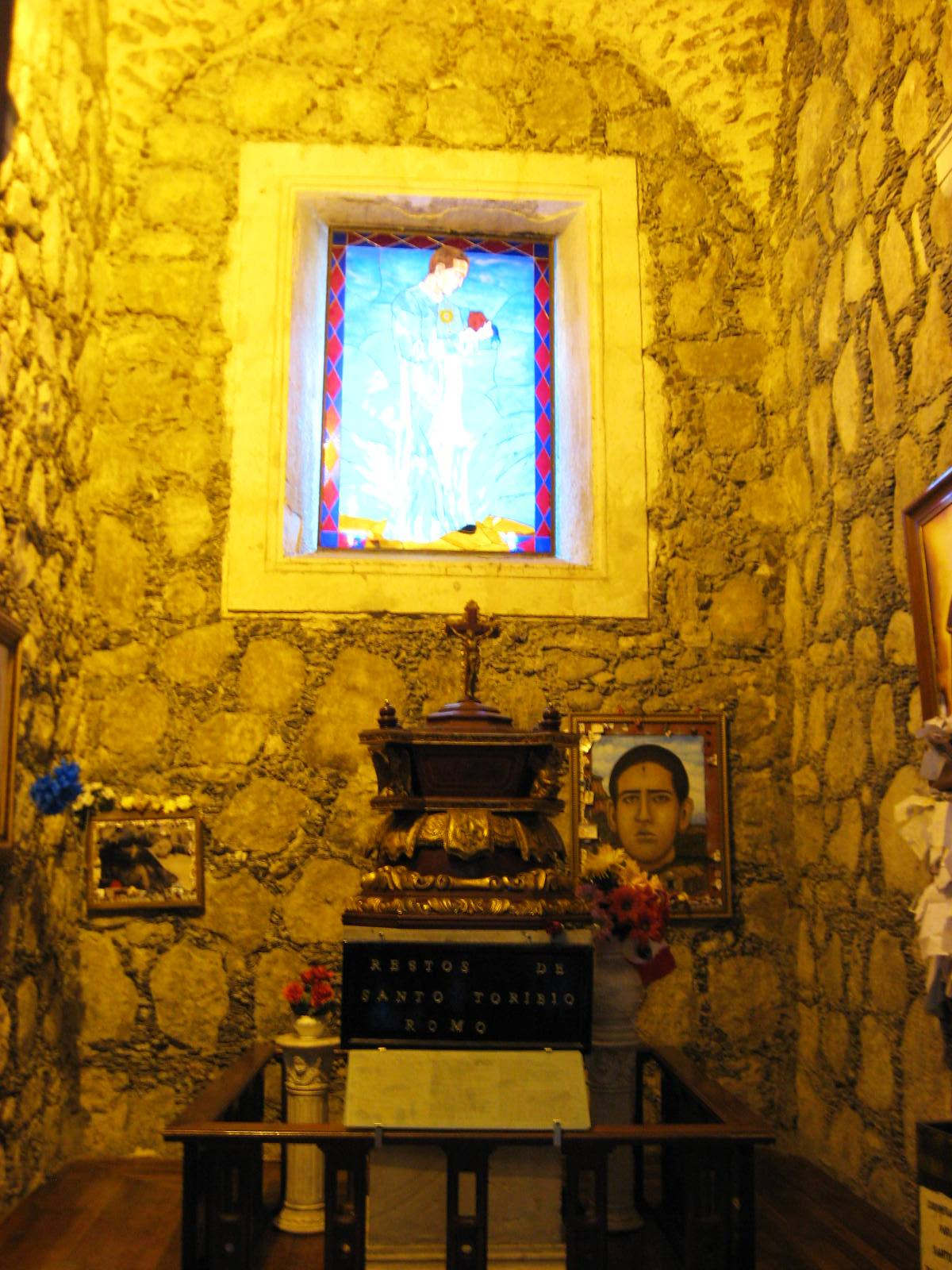
Chapel dedicated to Fr. Toribio in the main church of Tequila, Jalisco

== Veneration ==
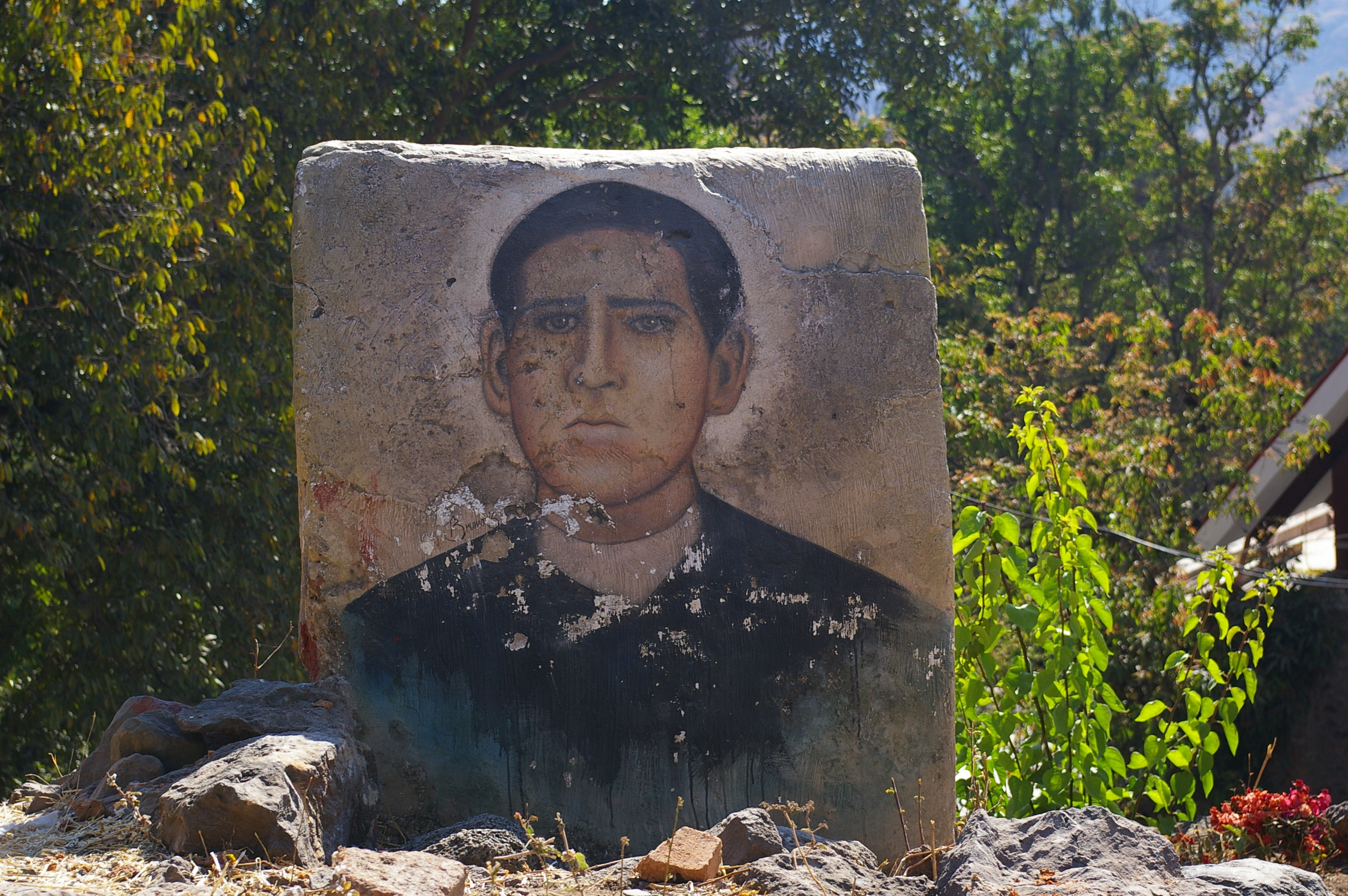
Mural of Padre Toribio near Tequila, Jalisco

Father Toribio Romo was beatified by Pope John Paul II on November 22, 1992, and canonized on May 21, 2000. His feast day is May 21.

Despite the fact that in 1920, fearing immigrants would lose their values, Father Toribio wrote a play titled "Let's go north!", a comedy that warned migrants against traveling to the States, there is a belief among some Mexicans that Toribio Romo has appeared to some who cross the border to assist them in distress. In the late 1970s migrants began telling stories about St. Toribio coming to their rescue.

The Saint Toribio Romo Fund, which bears his name, supports the work of the immigration services department of Catholic Charities in the Diocese of Monterey.
