= Hugo Rodríguez Díaz =

Mexican politician

- Born: 15 August 1957 (age 68); Ixtlahuacán del Río, Jalisco, Mexico
- Other name: Dr. Hugo
- Occupation: Politician
- Political party: Institutional Revolutionary Party
- Relatives: Especialidad en Oftalmología

Hugo Rodríguez Díaz (born 15 August 1957) is a Mexican politician affiliated with the Institutional Revolutionary Party (PRI). In the 2003 mid-terms he was elected to the Chamber of Deputies to represent Jalisco's 4th district during the 59th session of Congress.
