= David Galván Bermúdez =

Mexican Catholic priest, martyr and saint (1881–1915)

Saint David Galván Bermúdez
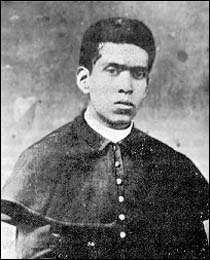

Martyr of the Cristero War
- Born: 29 January 1881; Guadalajara, Mexico
- Died: 30 January 1915 (aged 34); Guadalajara, Mexico
- Honored in: Catholic Church
- Beatified: 22 November 1992, St. Peter's Square, Vatican City by Pope John Paul II
- Canonized: 21 May 2000, St. Peter's Square, Vatican City by Pope John Paul II
- Feast: 21 May (Saints of the Cristero War); 29 January

David Galván Bermúdez (29 January 1881 – 30 January 1915) was a Mexican Catholic priest who was killed during the Cristero War. He was canonized by Pope John Paul II on 21 May 2000 as one of 25 Martyrs of the Cristero War.

== Life ==
David Galván was born in Guadalajara, Jalisco, son of José Trinidad Galván and Mariana Bermúdez. David's mother died when he was three years old. Later, his father remarried and David was taken care of by his father, sisters, and stepmother Victoriana Medina. From a young age he had to help his father in the shoe shop.

When he was fourteen, he entered the Saint Joseph of Guadalajara Seminary to attend high school, but he would leave in 1900 to return to work in the shoe shop. He would then ask for readmission two years later. Due to his low fidelity, the General Prefect Miguel de la Mora subjected him to rigorous tests for a year. But it was clear that David's personality had matured and surprised his examiners by his dedication to mental prayer and his perseverance in enduring adversity.

He became a teacher the seminary, becoming the chair for Latin, natural law, and sociology. He was ordained on May 20, 1909 when he was 28 years old and, shortly thereafter, he was confirmed as superior of the seminary. He was also the founder and director of the seminary magazine "Voice of Breath", from December 1910 to 1912. From his beginnings as a priest, he was characterized by helping the poor. In those same years, from 1909 to 1914, he was the chaplain of the Hospital of San José and the Orphanage of La Luz in Guadalajara. However, his work within the seminary was interrupted when the Archbishop of Guadalajara, Francisco Orozco y Jiménez, dissolved it following the arrest of 120 clerics.

In 1914, while he was vicar of Amátitán, he helped a young girl who was persecuted by the militant Enrique Vera for denying him marriage because she was already married. This brought Father Galván the enmity of the lieutenant, who later became his executioner. He was apprehended by orders of the aforementioned captain. The arrest lacked substance, which led to Father Galván regaining his freedom.

On the Saturday of 30 January 1915, violent clashes between host Villistas and Carrancistas were recorded in Guadalajara. The priests David Galván and José María Araiza prepared to help the dying and wounded. When they crossed the botanical garden, in front of the old San Miguel Hospital, they were intercepted by Enrique Vera, who ordered his immediate arrest and without prior trial, sentenced him to the death penalty. A timely pardon saved Father Araiza's life but Galván would not suffer the same fate, as he was sent to Coronel Calderón Street, next to the Belén Cemetery. In front of the firing squad and without losing his fortitude, Father Galván distributed the valuables he carried. He did not want to be blindfolded and in front of those responsible for executing it, he pointed calmly at his chest to receive the bullets.

== See also ==
- List of Mexican saints
- Saints of the Cristero War
