= Salvador Arellano Guzmán =

Mexican politician (born 1957)

- Born: 30 August 1957 (age 68); Guadalajara, Jalisco, Mexico
- Occupation: Politician
- Political party: PRI

Salvador Arellano Guzmán (born 30 August 1957) is a Mexican politician affiliated with the Institutional Revolutionary Party (PRI). In the 2012 general election he was elected to the Chamber of Deputies to represent Jalisco's 4th district during the 62nd session of Congress.
