= Enrique Villa Preciado =

Mexican politician (born 1951)

- Born: 21 July 1951 (age 74); Jalisco, Mexico
- Occupation: Politician
- Political party: PRI

Enrique Adolfo Villa Preciado (born 21 July 1951) is a Mexican politician from the Institutional Revolutionary Party (PRI). In the 2000 general election he was elected to the Chamber of Deputies to represent Jalisco's 4th district during the 58th session of Congress.
