= Diego Romo de Vivar =

Spanish adventurer (1589–1659)

- Born: 1589; Rielves, Spain
- Died: 19 June 1659 (aged 69–70); Santa María del Río Florido, Chihuahua, Nueva Vizcaya, New Spain (Present-day Chihuahua, Mexico).
- Occupations: Conquistador, explorer, royal governor and military officer for the Crown of Castile

Captain Diego Romo de Vivar (fl. 17th century) was a Spanish adventurer, explorer, royal governor and military officer, born in Rielves, Spain. He conquered and pacified a large part of the northern region of Mexico in present day Chihuahua. He began his adventures in the Americas in the city of San Felipe, Guanajuato before becoming a fixture in Aguascalientes society among the colonial elites of Nueva Galicia.

== Exploration and adventures ==
The adventures of the Romo de Vivar family began with the younger Diego Romo de Vivar, who was born in Rielves in 1589. He moved in 1624, following his marriage to Doña María Rangel, to the Kingdom of Nueva Galicia, most likely to take charge of various lands that would have been granted to him by his father-in-law as a dowry. The marriage of Diego Romo de Vivar and Doña María would create a link between the towns of Parral and Aguascalientes, a region to which they would later emigrate, but not without first participating in the discoveries of some major sites, including one of the first salt discoveries north of Chihuahua, today known as "Villa Ahumada", discovered in 1647, when Don Diego ventured there as an explorer.

That same year the father-in-law of Diego Romo de Vivar, in addition to having acquired numerous lands, was also named as alférez in Nueva Vizcaya, New Spain. Don Diego, himself, would also continue to acquire numerous properties and holdings throughout Mexico. Among his many properties was Rancho de Canutillo, later owned by Pancho Villa, who was assassinated in Parral on 20 July 1923 by Jesús Salas Barraza's men.

Don Diego was described as a "restless man" and "a true adventurer", and although he settled in modern day Aguascalientes, he explored the numerous territories north of Mexico, exploited the mines in the Parral region and contained the frequent attacks of many of the most violent indigenous tribes, including the Apaches and Comanches. He even defended the coasts of Nayarit against the attacks of pirates. His courage earned him the rank of captain and years later as the royal governor of San José del Parral, a place to which King Philip IV would grant the title of the "Silver capital of the world" in 1660.

== Family ==
Don Diego Romo de Vivar was born into a prominent family in Rielves, Spain. He married Doña María Rangel sometime around 1624 in San Felipe, Guanajuato. He had 9 children; María, Captain Pedro Romo de Vivar Y Rangel who was married with Lorenza Tiscareño Ruiz de Esparza, Juan, Isabel, Antonia, Diego, Jerónimo, Francisco and José who followed in the adventurous footsteps of Don Diego Romo de Vivar and dispersed in different cities of Nueva Galicia and Nueva Vizcaya. His son, Diego Romo de Vivar, owner of the Hacienda de Rincón de Romos, contracted marriage with Doña Luisa de Angeles y de los Reyes. His grandson, and third of his name, Diego Romo de Vivar was an explorer, his brother Juan became alcalde mayor of Aguascalientes, José was also an explorer and possibly the first European to colonize the territories of the current populations of Álamos, Nogales and Sonora in the state of Sonora, north of Mexico. Pedro was captain, along with his brother Juan who bought the hacienda of Rincón de Ortega. Like his brothers, he was an explorer, rancher and miner and very possibly the first to exercise these activities in the territories that now make up the state of Arizona in the United States. His grandson José Romo de Vivar, was one of the early settlers in Arizona.
