= Jorge Quintero Bello =

Mexican politician

- Born: 14 September 1947 (age 78); Jalisco, Mexico
- Occupation: Politician
- Political party: PAN

Jorge Quintero Bello (born 14 September 1947) is a Mexican politician affiliated with the National Action Party (PAN). In the 2006 general election he was elected to the Chamber of Deputies to represent Jalisco's 4th district during the 60th session of Congress.
