= José Romo de Vivar =

Mexican (Nueva España) rancher, miner, and early settler in Arizona

José Romo de Vivar was a Novo Hispanic rancher and miner, an early European settler in Arizona.

== Biography ==
Vivar's grandfather was Diego Romo de Vivar (1589–1691), a Spanish explorer and military officer who conquered a large part of present-day Chihuahua.

Vivar founded San Lázaro ranch in the Santa Cruz River valley, and raised longhorn cattle across Cananea, the southern Huachuca Mountains, and the San Rafael Valley. Most Spanish settlers in Arizona left the area as the silver mines sold out and the local Pima people remained hostile, but Vivar remained.
