= Child Martyrs of Tlaxcala =

Catholic saints

Saints Cristobal, Antonio and Juan Martyrs of Tlaxcala
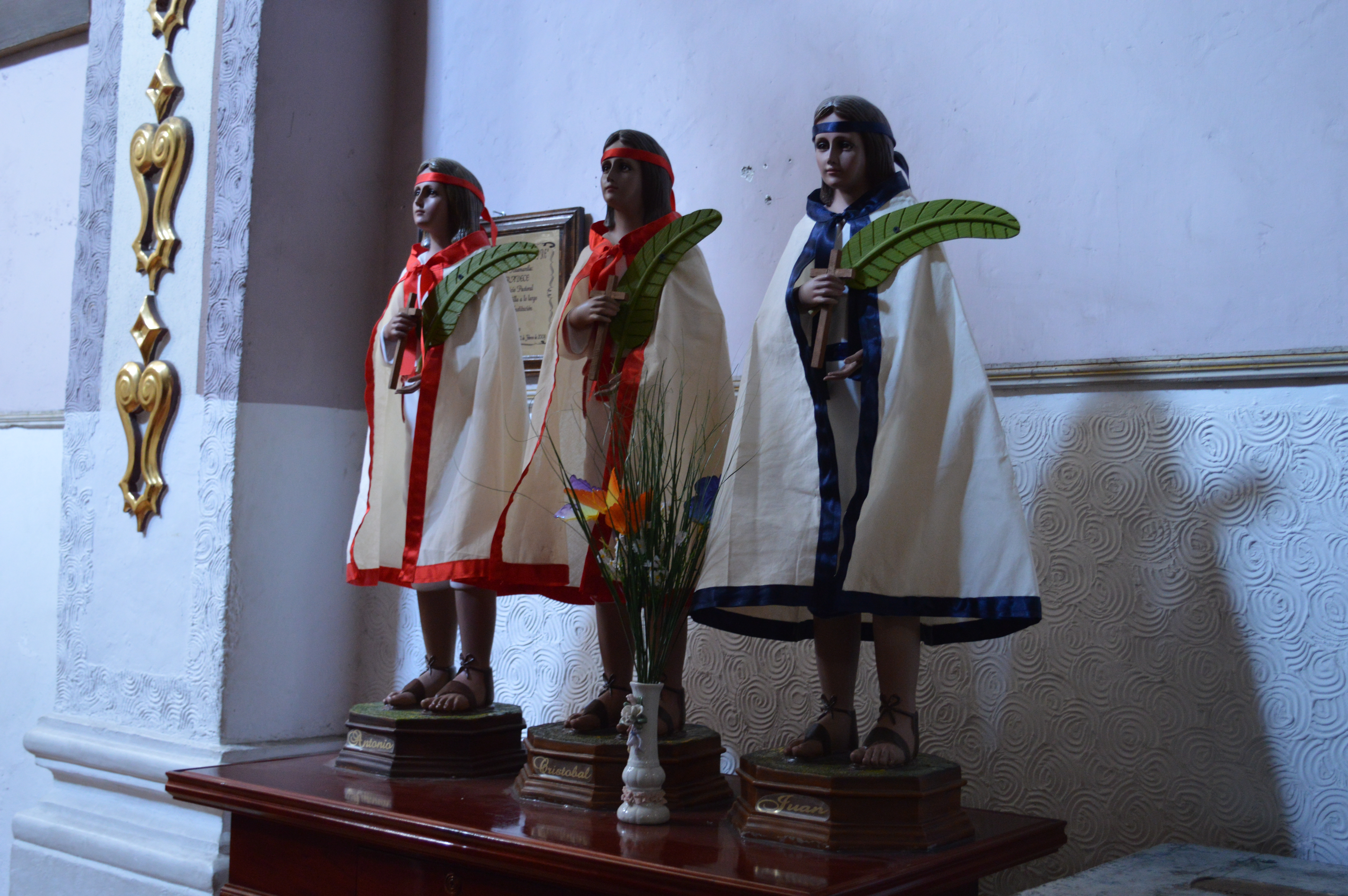
- Statue of the three children

Martyrs
- Born: Cristobal: c. 1514–15; Atlihuetzía, Mexico; Antonio: c. 1516–17; Tizatlán, Mexico; Juan: Tizatlán, Mexico
- Died: Cristobal: 1527; Atlihuetzía, Mexico; Antonio and Juan: 1529; Cuauhtinchán, Mexico
- Venerated in: Catholic Church
- Beatified: 6 May 1990, Basilica of Our Lady of Guadalupe, Mexico City, Mexico by Pope John Paul II
- Canonized: 15 October 2017, Saint Peter's Square, Vatican City by Pope Francis
- Feast: 23 September
- Attributes: Martyr's palm Crucifix; Rosary
- Patronage: Tlaxcala; Mexican children; People ridiculed for their piety

The Martyrs of Tlaxcala were three Mexican Christian teenagers from the Tlaxcaltec people of the modern state of Tlaxcala: Cristobal (1514/15–1527) and the two companions Antonio (1516/17–1529) and Juan (1516/17–1529). The three teenagers were converts from the Nahua religion of their families to the Catholic Church in Mexico and received their educations from missionaries of the Order of Friars Minor who baptized them while evangelizing in the area. Their activism and evangelical zeal led to their honour killings by fellow Tlaxcaltec people, including their close relatives, who detested their newfound faith and viewed them as dangers to their values and rituals.

The teenagers were beatified in Mexico in mid-1990 by Pope John Paul II. Pope Francis – on 23 March 2017 – issued a decree that the three teenagers would be canonized without having a miracle attributed to their intercession as is the norm. The teenagers were canonized as saints on 15 October 2017.

== Life ==
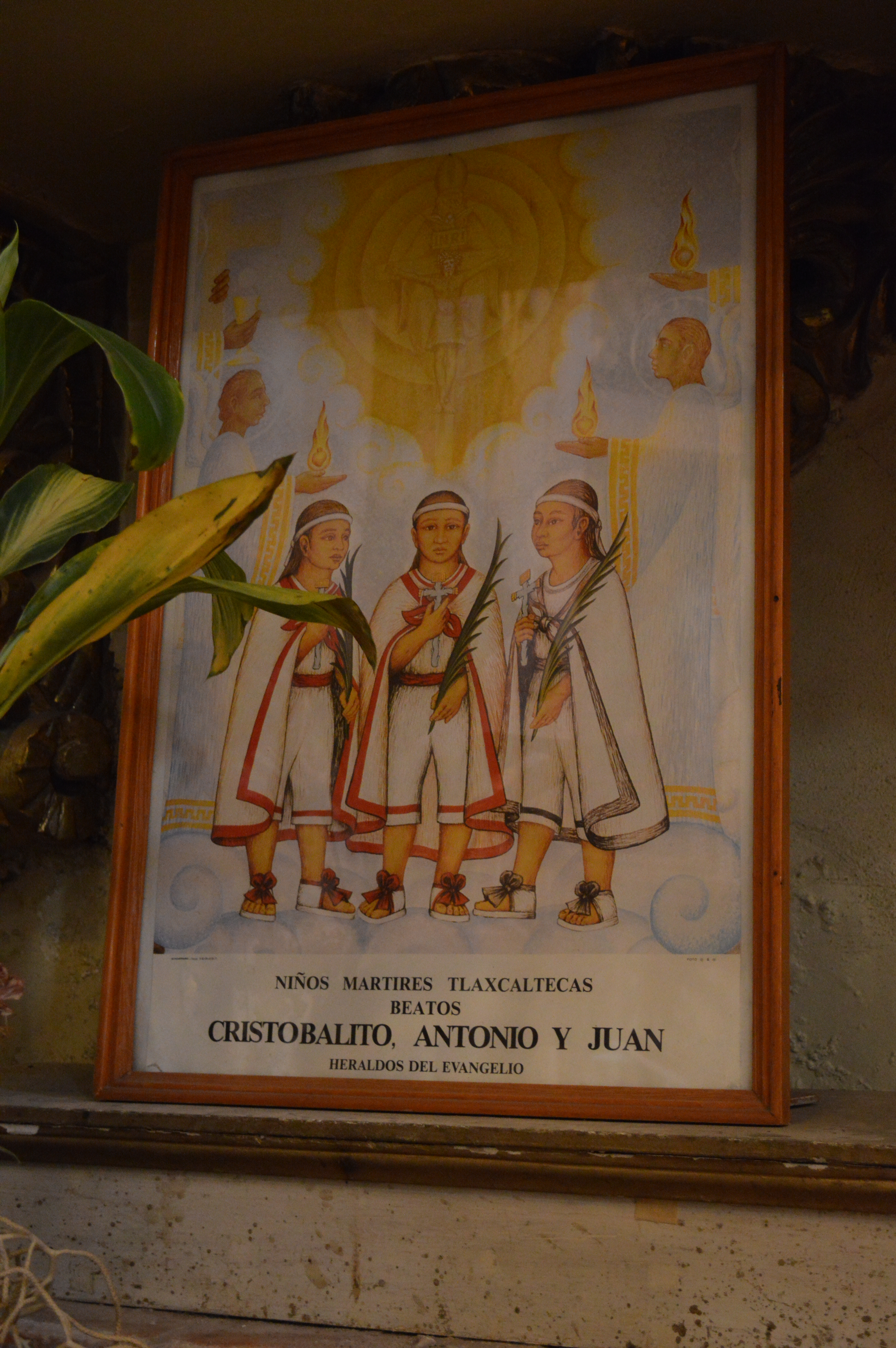
Image in Mexico of the three children

The primary source for the life of the Tlaxcalan Child Martyrs is Toribio Benavente Motolinia who described their life in 1539, with later texts in Nahuatl by Juan Bautista.

=== Cristobal ===
Cristobal was born either in 1514 or in 1515 as the son to an indigenous leader. He was considered the heir of his father Acxotécatl. He had three brothers: Bernardino and Luis in addition to one whose name is unknown. His mother was Tlapaxilotzin – she was Acxotécatl's first wife before the latter married Xochipapalotzin.

He converted to Roman Catholicism and received his education in Tlaxcala from the Order of Friars Minor – at their first school – who baptized him and instilled in him deep religious values and practices. The Franciscan brother Motolinia often called him "Cristobalito" – translated as "little Christopher." His father did not want to send Cristobal – his favorite son – to the Franciscan school but was convinced to do so when the Franciscans and Cristobal's brothers persuaded him to do so.

His father did not give much importance to Cristobal's spirit of evangelism – which was constant and persuasive – but could tolerate it no longer when his son started breaking indigenous religious symbols in their home. He first forgave Cristobal but grew infuriated and planned to murder him.

It became clear to him that Cristobal would not renounce his faith and revert to the indigenous values, so he took Cristobal and burned him over a bonfire. Cristobal died the next morning from his grievous injuries in 1527 after calling out to his father and expressing his forgiveness.

His father buried his remains in a room of the house where it might not be discovered but he was soon apprehended for the murder and the Spaniards sentenced him to death for the crime. In 1528 the Franciscan friar Andrea found his remains and had them exhumed for formal interment elsewhere.

=== Antonio and Juan ===
Antonio was born either in 1516 or in 1517 as the grandson of the noble Xiochténacti and was considered his heir being the first grandson. He converted to the Roman Catholic faith and began to detest the native rituals of the indigenous peoples including his own. Antonio served as an able interpreter for the Franciscans in the area. Antonio and his servant Juan were caught desecrating indigenous religious effigies and were murdered in 1529 when the locals caught them. Antonio came out of the room to find Juan dead and asked the attackers the reason Juan was targeted and not Antonio – the teen admitted he was the one desecrating the effigies and died when the attackers in turn attacked him.

Juan was born either in 1516 or in 1517 and was of humble origins; he too converted to Roman Catholicism and worked as Antonio's servant. Juan died alongside Antonio in 1529.

The bodies of both teenagers were thrown off a cliff but the Dominican friar Bernardino recovered them and moved them to Tepeaca to be interred.

== Canonization ==
The beatification process opened under Pope John Paul II on 7 January 1982 after the Congregation for the Causes of Saints issued the official "nihil obstat" to the cause and titled the three teenagers as Servants of God. A cognitional process was held in the Diocese of Tlaxcala that Bishop Luis Munive Escobar oversaw; the C.C.S. later validated this process on 8 November 1985 and historians approved the cause on 8 November 1985 after deeming no historical obstacles existed to impede the cause.

The postulation sent the Positio dossier to the C.C.S. in 1989 which allowed for theologians to approve its contents on 24 November 1989 and the C.C.S. to do so as well on 6 February 1990. Pope John Paul II – on 3 March 1990 – confirmed that the three teenagers were killed "in odium fidei" (in hatred of the faith) and beatified them on 6 May 1990 on his apostolic visit to Mexico in the capital of Mexico City.

It had been reported that the three teenagers could be proclaimed as saints either in 2017 or in 2018 since the cause was in its "advantaged stages" according to Cardinal Angelo Amato in a meeting with the postulation. The cardinal also expressed that Pope Francis was monitoring the cause and had expressed his own closeness to this particular cause. The 30 C.C.S. members met to approve the cause on 14 March 2017 before passing it to the pope for approval; Pope Francis approved the canonization without the required miracle on 23 March 2017 thus confirming the three teenagers would be canonized. The date was formalized at a gathering of cardinals on 20 April and the children were canonized as saints on 15 October 2017.

The postulator for the cause at the time of their canonization was the Franciscan Giovangiuseppe Califano.
