= Julia Navarrete Guerrero =

Mexican Roman Catholic professed religious

Venerable Julia Navarrete Guerrero
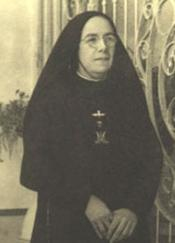
- c. 1930
- Born: 1 June 1881; Oaxaca, Mexico
- Died: 21 November 1974 (aged 93); Toluca, Estado de México, Mexico

Julia Navarrete Guerrero (1 June 1881 – 21 November 1974) – in religious Julia of the Thorns of the Sacred Heart – was a Mexican Roman Catholic professed religious and the founder of the Misioneras Hijas de la Purísima Virgen María. Navarrete first felt called to promote religious education from her adolescence while still a student before moving to the national capital where she met the Jesuit priest Alberto Cuscó who formed her in the religious life. Not long after this she became a nun and set about founding schools and missions across both Mexico and the United States where she first started in Texas. Her brother Juan María Navarrete Guerrero became the Archbishop of Hermosillo and whose beatification process is ongoing.

Her beatification process launched in Mexico in 1985 and Pope John Paul II later titled her as Venerable on 22 June 2004 as confirmation that Navarrete maintained heroic virtue in her life.

== Life ==
Julia Navarrete Guerrero was born in Oaxaca on 1 June 1881 to pious parents Professor Demetrio Navarrete (who served as the director for a teacher's college) and Julia Guerrero (a music and singing teacher). Her siblings were all brothers: Francisco and Juan María (12.8.1896–21.2.1982) entered the religious life and her other brothers were Florencio, Rafael and José. From her childhood she maintained a deep devotion to the Blessed Mother and to the Sacred Heart that she went on to promote to others throughout her life. Her brother Juan María became the Archbishop of Hermosillo and whose beatification is ongoing while her brother Francisco became a priest. Navarrete made her First Communion aged seven.

Her education was spent in her hometown where she was first homeschooled before entering into an all-girls school aged twelve where she became well-liked according to her peers and teachers. From age fifteen she began to feel a call to follow Jesus Christ in her life and confided this to her Jesuit confessor Fr. Antonio Repiso. He permitted her to make a private vow to remain chaste on 25 March 1898 which also received parental approval. But in 1898 in her late teens she felt compelled to follow God's call and so moved to the national capital for greater discernment and it happened to be at the height of the Mexican Revolution where attending Mass became a danger for people in some places. It was at the capital that she met the Jesuit priest Alberto Cuscó who encouraged her to remain in the capital for he would help her attain her vision of promoting a Christian education to others and to become a professed religious herself where she began her formation on 5 October 1898; she was first vested in the habit that December. Navarrete made her initial profession under Cuscó on 3 May 1901, not long before the priest's Jesuit superiors recalled him. Her perpetual profession was made in August 1907.

Navarrete liked the prospect in her adolescence of providing a biblical education to all people in order to bring them closer to Christ. Navarrete later founded a religious congregation in 1903 and the Franciscan Observants Bishop of Aguascalientes José María de Jesús Portugal Serrato approved the order's constitution while also entrusting her to open a school. The bishop provided the order houses to use in addition to furniture and materials; this school was constructed in a short time and was opened on 4 January 1904. Bishop Serrato later provided diocesan canonical approval for her order on 12 July 1904 while the order received papal approval from Pope John XXIII some decades later on 8 November 1962.

In her time heading her religious congregation she founded 51 schools and missions in total in both Mexico (47) and the United States (4) for the secular and religious education for children. Navarrete travelled to the state of Texas for the first time at the invitation of her home diocese in order to begin establishing schools and missions there; this was her first ever visit to the United States. It was in rural Kingsville in 1916 that she founded a convent for her nuns.

Navarrete died due to an illness that she suffered for some time on 21 November 1974 in Toluca; doctors had prescribed incorrect treatments that compounded her pain and suffering though she bore it with patience and did not complain about the inadequate treatment. Sister Maximina Cruz was present at her bedside during her final hour and had nursed her during her long illness. Her remains are interred in a chapel in Aguascalientes.

== Beatification process ==
The beatification process commenced on 1 March 1985 once the Congregation for the Causes of Saints issued the official "nihil obstat" decree (meaning no objections) and titled Navarrete as a Servant of God; the diocesan process was held in the Aguascalientes diocese from 30 June 1985 until 21 August 1992 at which point all documentation was sent to C.C.S. officials in Rome for additional investigation. The C.C.S. later validated this process on 6 March 1993 and later received the Positio dossier from the postulation in 1997 to assess it.

Nine theologians confirmed the cause after having reviewed the dossier on 19 December 2003 as did the C.C.S. members some months later on 4 May 2004. Navarrete became titled as Venerable on 22 June 2004 after Pope John Paul II confirmed that the late religious had lived a model Christian life of heroic virtue.

Navarrete's beatification depends upon papal confirmation of a miracle attributed to her intercession; it is often a healing that medicine and science fail to explain. One such case was investigated and sent to authorities in Rome for further medical and theological assessment and after the diocesan process of investigation received C.C.S. validation on 8 June 2017.

The current postulator for this cause is the Discalced Carmelite priest Romano Gambalunga.

=== Failed miracle ===
The cause stalled on 3 March 2005 after medical experts disproved a potential miracle that had been submitted to them after deeming a scientific explanation for the healing recorded. The C.C.S. had validated the case on 19 November 2009 and had sent it to the medical panel for evaluation.
