= Rielves =

Coordinates: 39°58′N 4°11′W

- municipality
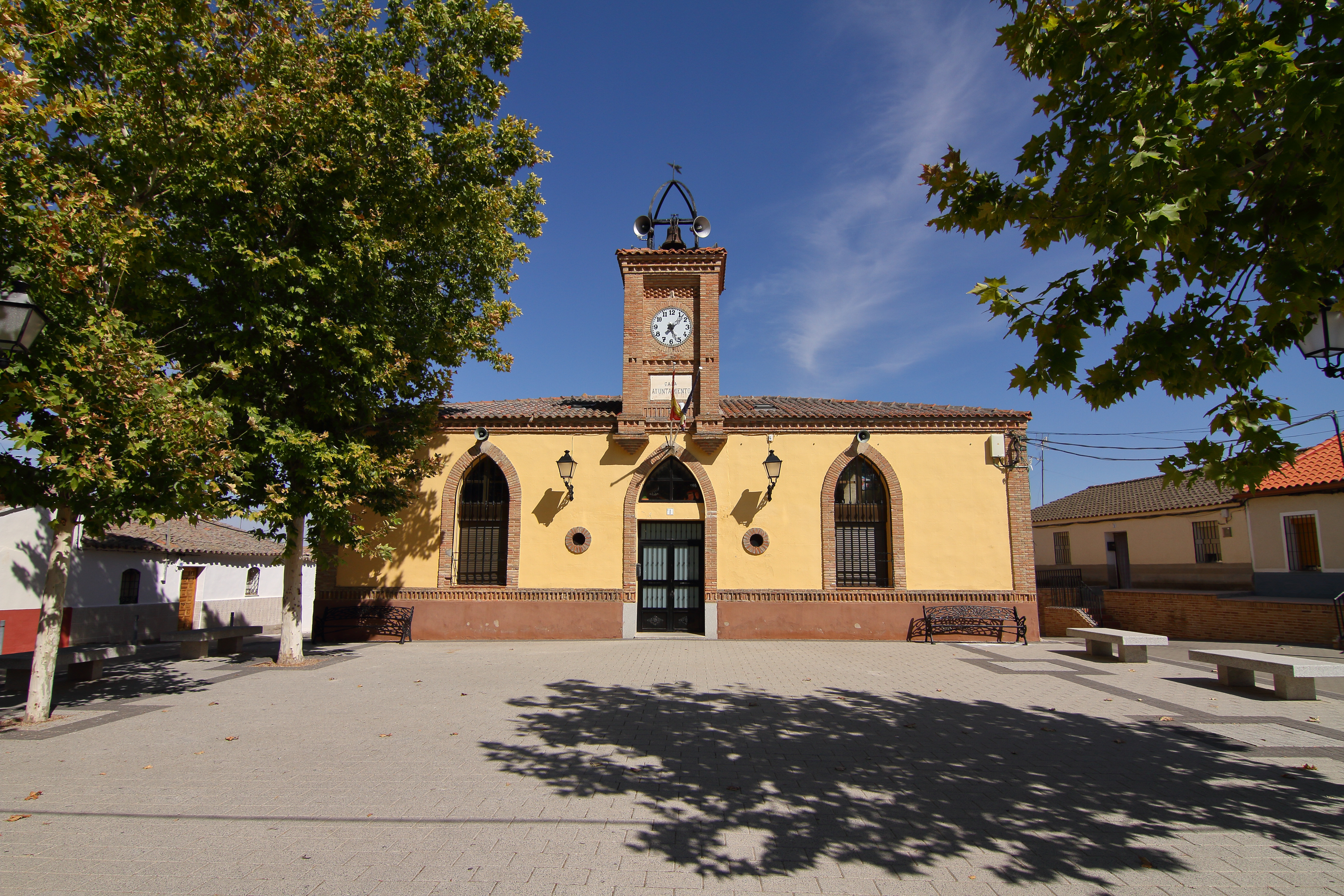
- Rielves Town Hall

- Flag Coat of arms
- Interactive map of Rielves
- Country: Spain
- Autonomous community: Castile-La Mancha
- Province: Toledo
- Municipality: Rielves

Area
  - Total: 33 km^{2} (13 sq mi)
- Elevation: 494 m (1,621 ft)

Population (2025-01-01)
  - Total: 900
  - Density: 27/km^{2} (71/sq mi)
- Time zone: UTC+1 (CET)
  - Summer (DST): UTC+2 (CEST)

Rielves is a municipality located in the province of Toledo, Castile-La Mancha, Spain. According to the 2006 census (INE), the municipality had a population of 626 inhabitants.
