= Ixtlahuacán del Río =

- Municipality and town
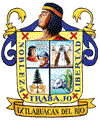
- Coat of arms

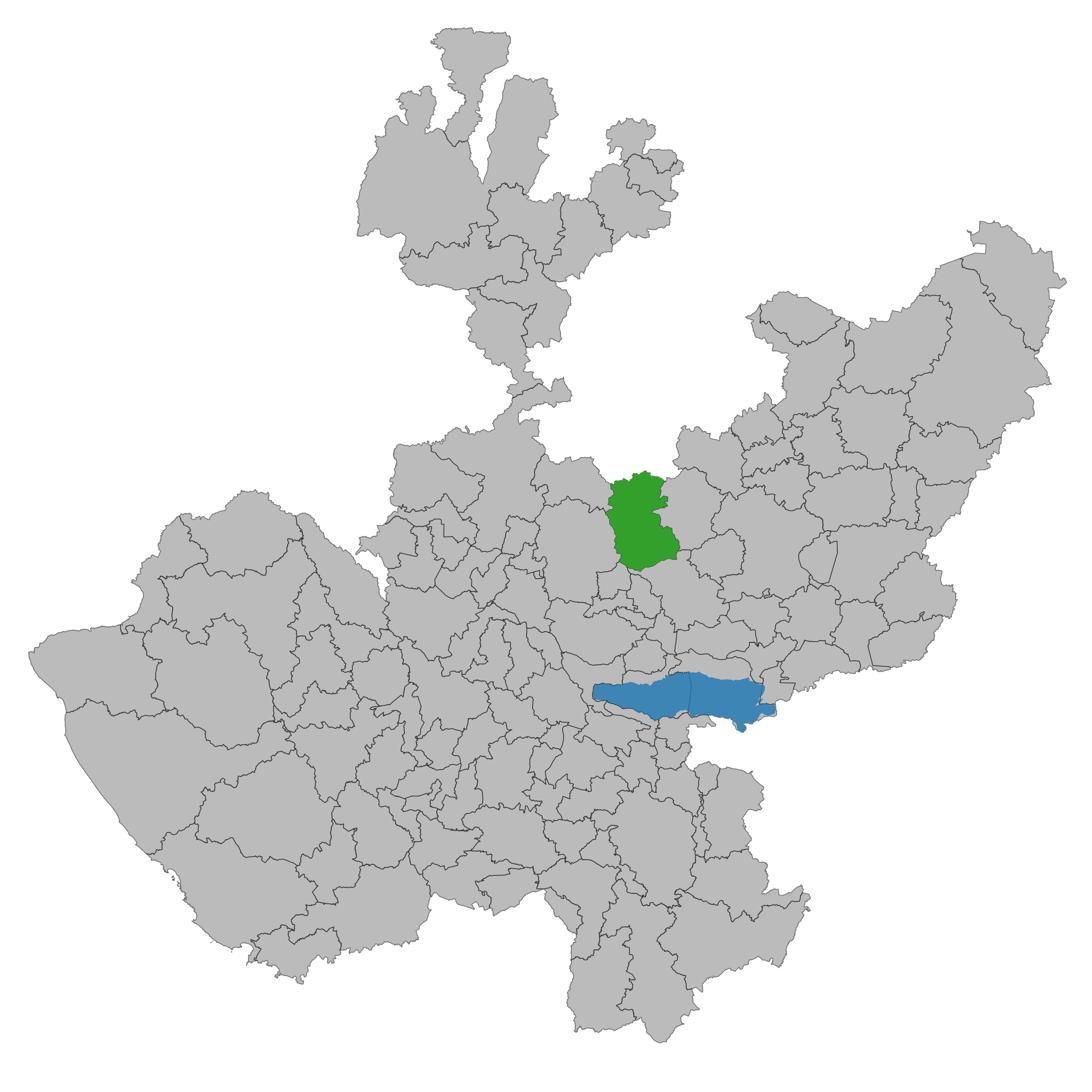
- Location of the municipality in Jalisco

- Location in Mexico
- Coordinates: 20°52′N 103°15′W
- Country: Mexico
- State: Jalisco

Area
  - Total: 831.8 km^{2} (321.2 sq mi)
  - Town: 2.67 km^{2} (1.03 sq mi)

Population (2020 census)
  - Total: 20,465
  - Density: 24.60/km^{2} (63.72/sq mi)
  - Town: 6,882
  - Town density: 2,580/km^{2} (6,680/sq mi)

Ixtlahuacán del Rio is a town and municipality in the center of the Mexican state of Jalisco, a little less than 50 kilometres (31 mi) from state capital Guadalajara. It stands at 1,655 metres (5,430 ft) above sea level; the climate is semi-arid, with a mild winter and an average annual temperature of 19 °C (66 °F).

== Pre-Hispanic antecedents of Ixtlahuacán del Río ==
Ixtlahuacán is a word of Nahuatl origin; the name means "flat place". It was founded by the Toltecs in approximately AD 610; it is hard to be certain of the exact date of founding, because none of the groups who inhabited the region — Tecuexes, Tepehuanes, Coanes, Cazcanos, and Zacatecos — had a written language in this period.

== Toponymy ==
Ixtlahuacán is a word of Nahuatl origin, it is the union of the words "Ixtláhuatl" (plains) and "Can" (place); therefore, it means: "Place of Plains".

== History ==
It was founded by the Toltecs at the beginning of the 7th century when they passed through the region. Possibly he was first in Tlacotán where tribes settled Totonacas, Tepehuanes, and Coanes, the founders being the Tepehuanes, who stood out for their belligerence.

The conquerors that approached Tlacotán were continually harassed by the aborigines of Ixtlahuacán. The conquest was carried out by Nuño de Guzmán who arrived in Tlacotán in 1529. It seemed a strategic place to defend and dominate the entire Atemajac Valley. Fines of 1531 gave the name of Nueva Galicia to everything conquered by Nuño de Guzmán, who was appointed governor, founding Guadalajara in Nochistlán; after not having followed, ordering his transfer to Tlacotán in May 1533, giving him the name of Guadalajara; the foundation was not carried out until 1535 and in 1539 royal ID was received granting the coat of arms to the town (Tlacotán), being seat of Guadalajara from 1535 to 1540.

In 1825 it had a town hall and from that date until 1910 it belonged to the 1st canton of Guadalajara; in 1838, it had a category of town and in 1878 it is already mentioned as a municipality. They had the police stations of Tepac, Tlacotán and the Congregation of San Antonio. On February 28, 1894, the Tepac police station was abolished and the Congregation of San Antonio was erected as a police station; and in March 1912, the Tlacotán police station moved to Trejos, and in 1922 the police station was restored.

== Geography ==
=== Location ===
Ixtlahuacán del Río is almost in the center of the state, its extreme coordinates are 20º 42'40 "to 21º 05 '23" north latitude and 103º 63' 09 "to 103º 22 '35" west longitude; at an approximate height of 1,655 metres (5,430 ft). The municipality borders the state of Zacatecas to the north; to the east with the municipality of Cuquío; to the south with the municipalities of Zapotlanejo and Guadalajara; to the west with the municipalities of Zapopan and San Cristóbal de la Barranca.

=== Topography ===
In general, its surface is semi-flat (40%) and flat (35%), there are rugged areas (25%), with heights up to 1,900 masl, highlighting the Monte Grande and the Higuera hill.

=== Soil ===
The territory is made up of land belonging to tertiary period. The soil consists mostly of igneous rocks acidic extrusive with some moles of basalt, rhyolite and volcanic gap with tuff; in the highest parts the predominant types are: haplic feozem, pelvic vertisol, chernozem and lithosol. The municipality has a territorial area of 56,494 hectares, of which 14,200 are used for agricultural purposes, 23,270 in livestock, 12,900 are for forest use, 390 are urban land and 5,734 hectares have another use. As far as property is concerned, an area of 45,045 hectares is private and another of 11,449 is ejidal; no property

=== Hydrography ===
Its hydrological resources are provided by the rivers and streams that make up the Juchipila-Santiago-Río Verde Grande Belén sub-basin of the Lerma-Chapala-Santiago Hydrological region. The main rivers are: Santiago, Achichilco, Cuquío, Verde and Juchipila; the streams: El Tigre, Carrizalillo, Los Cuartos, Saucitos, Tecomastes, Agua Colorada and San Pablo; the dams: San Antonio and Los Sauces.

=== Climate ===
The climate is semi-dry, with dry spring and winter, and semi-warm, with mild winter. The average annual temperature is 19 °C (66 °F), with a maximum of 25.6 °C (78.1 °F) and a minimum of 10.1 °C (50.2 °F). The rainfall regime is recorded between the months of June, July, and August, with an average rainfall of 855.2 millimeters. The prevailing winds are heading north.

=== Flora and fauna ===
The flora is composed of cedar, pine, oak, oak and ocote. The fauna is made up of deer, hawk, wildcat, coyote, skunk, armadillo, the tlacuache (zarigueya) and a great variety of birds.

== Economy ==
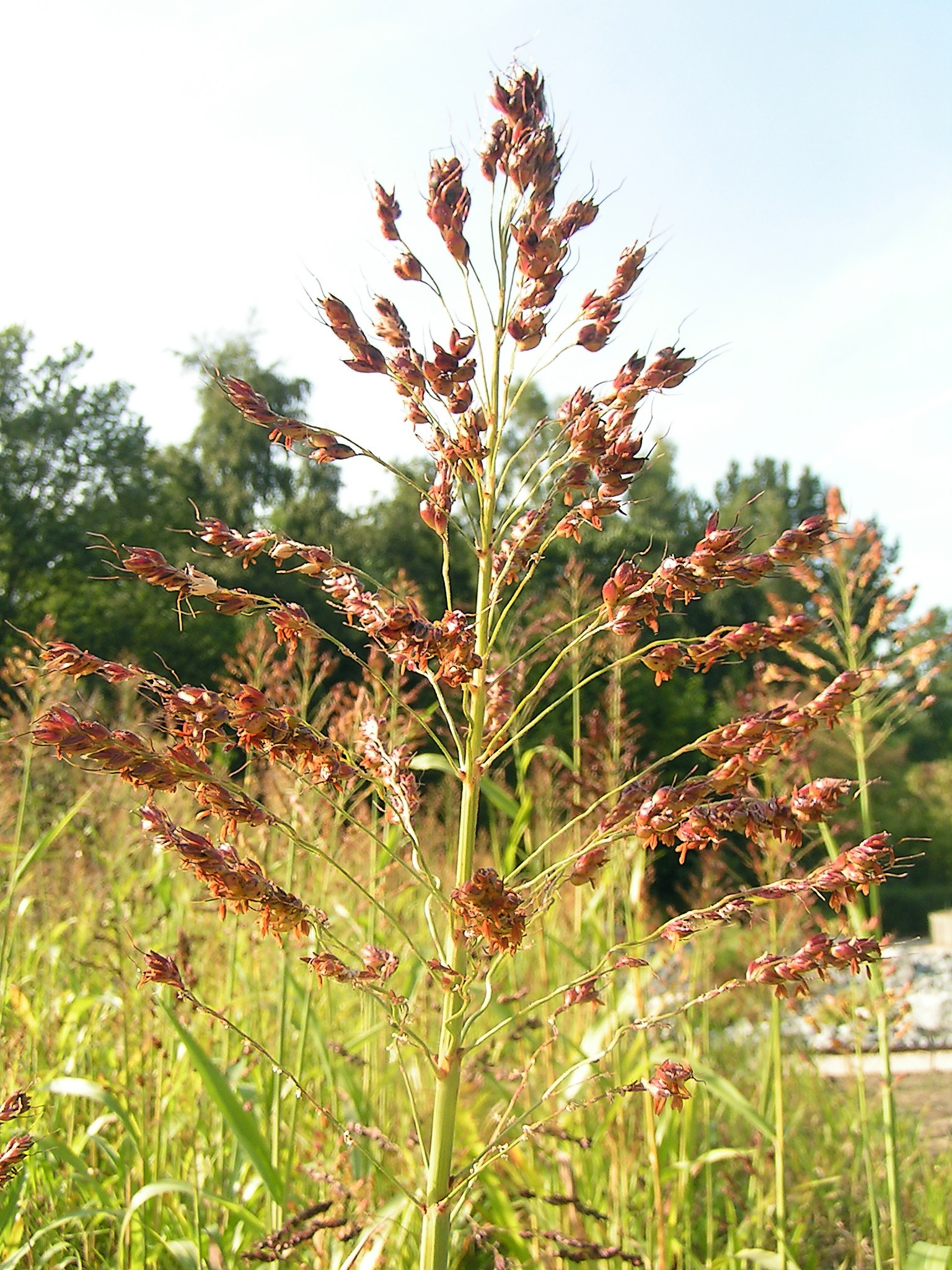
Corn and sorghum are grown in the municipality.

39.82% of the inhabitants are dedicated to primary sector, 23.41% to secondary sector, 34.80% to tertiary sector and the rest is not specified. 38.18% are economically active. The main economic activities are: agriculture, livestock, forestry and industry.

- 'Agriculture' : maize, chía, beans, sorghum and pumpkin are grown.
- 'Livestock' : cattle are raised cattle, pigs, sheep, equine and goats. In addition to birds and hive s.
- 'Industry' : highlights the manufacturing industry.
- 'Tourism' : it has natural and historical attractions.
- 'Commerce' : it has restaurant s and small shops. The sale of essential products and mixed stores that sell various items predominate.
- 'Services' : financial, professional, technical, communal, social, personal and maintenance services are provided.
- 'Forest exploitation' : the pine is exploited.
- 'Mining' : there are deposits of quarry.

== Infrastructure ==
=== Education ===
87.61% of the population is alphabeta, of which 30.99% has finished primary education. The municipality has 32 preschool, 61 primary education, 13 secondary s, three baccalaureate and an extension of the Higher Technological Institute of Tala.

=== Health ===
Health care is attended by the State Department of Health, the Mexican Social Security Institute and private doctors. The System for the Integral Development of the Family (DIF) is responsible for social welfare.

=== Sport ===
It has sports centers, where it is practiced: football, basketball, athletics and volleyball. It also has cultural centers, plaza, parks, gardens and library.

=== Living place ===
It has 4,286 homes, which are generally private. 96.48% have electricity service, 48.34% have drainage and drinking water service. Its construction is generally based on brick, concrete and partition.

=== Services ===
The municipality has potable water, telephone and internet services, sewerage, street lighting, markets, trail, cemeteries, roads, public toilets, public safety, parks, gardens and sports centers. 69.2% of the inhabitants have drinking water; 74.2% of sewerage and 95.9% of electrical energy.

=== Media and communication channels ===
It has mail, fax, telegraph, telephone and radiotelephony service. Transportation takes place through the Guadalajara-Saltillo highway, junction Ixtlahuacán del Río. It has a network of rural roads that connect the towns; Transportation is carried out by public buses or rental vehicles and individuals. Currently the municipal government has a small fleet of trucks that can provide services for free, these trucks have been donated by the State Government of Jalisco.

=== Religion ===
98.53% profess the Catholic religion, there are also believers of Jehovah's Witnesses, Seventh-day Adventists, Protestants and believers of other religions. 0.24% of the inhabitants showed not to practice any religion.

== Culture ==
- 'Gastronomy' : the tamales, the birria chicken or turkey, the mole; and of its drinks stand out tequila and mezcal.
- 'Typical costumes' : the charro suit.
- 'Crafts' : wooden furniture, embroidery, textiles and saddles are made.

=== Sites of interest ===
- The Shrine of Our Lady of Guadalupe, dates from 1873.
- Temple of Our Lady of the Rosary.
- Hacienda Animas del Romero.
- City Hall.
- Valle de Juárez Dam.
- Agua Azul waterfall.
- Ruins of the Third Guadalajara (Currently Pantheon of Tlacotán.
- Waterfall The Five Lords.
- San Antonio de los Vázquez Dam
- San Antonio de los Vázquez Temple, dates from (May 1888)
- Cerro Alto.
- Los Sauces Dam.
- San Antonio de los Vázquez.
- Tlacotán Dam.
- Achichilco River.
- Arroyo Blanco River.
- Waterfall Follow it.
- Santo Domingo area.

=== Parties ===
- Party to San Pascual Baílon: from May 15 to 17.
- Party to the Virgin of Guadalupe: from December 1 to 12.
- Palenque: September 9–16.
- National holidays: September 15 and 16.
- Festivities of June (San Antonio) June 5 to 13.
- Party January 1 (San Antonio).
- Patron Festivities from May 7 to 15 (Palos Altos).

== Government ==
Its form of government is democratic and depends on state government and federal; Elections are held every three years, when the municipal president and her/his council are elected. The municipal president is Pedro Haro Ocampo, a member of MC, who was re-elected during the elections held on 6 June 2021. The municipality has 179 locations, the most important being: Ixtlahuacán del Río (municipal seat), San Antonio de los Vázquez, Trejos, Tlacotán, Palos Altos, San Nicolás and Mascuala.

=== Municipal presidents ===
Term	Municipal president	Political party	Notes
1983-1985	Manuel Abundis Prieto	PRI	
1986-1988	Francisco Alonso Sánchez	PRI	
1989-1992	Hugo Rodríguez Díaz	PRI	
1992-1995	Gabriel Sánchez Martínez	PRI	
1995-1997	Miguel Miguel Loera García	PAN	
1998-2000	Javier Haro Tello	PRI	
2001-2003	José Juan Saldaña Ávila	PRI	
2004-2006	Javier Sánchez Díaz	PRI	
2007-2009	Francisco Sánchez García	PRI	
2010-2012	Roberto Martínez Delgado	PVEM	
2012-2015	Gerardo Godoy Jiménez	PRI; PVEM	
2015-2018	Salvador Ramírez Mancilla	PT	
2018-2021	Pedro Haro Ocampo	MC	Applied for a temporary leave, to run for reelection
2021	Moisés Jara Yáñez	MC	Acting municipal president
2021-2024	Pedro Haro Ocampo	MC	He was reelected on 06/06/2021
2024-	Leoncio Guzmán González	Morena	

=== Notable people ===
- Javier Haro Tello, physician, municipal president, and local deputy.
- Miguel de la Mora, physician.
- Francisco Rodríguez Gómez, governor of Jalisco.
- Filiberto Ruvalcaba Sánchez, union leader and senator.
- Manuel Yáñez Rodríguez, craftsman.
- Miguel M. de la Mora, bishop.
- Benjamín Castillo Plascencia, bishop emeritus of the Roman Catholic Diocese of Celaya.
- J. Refugio Mercado Diaz, bishop.
