= Cuquío =

- Municipality and town
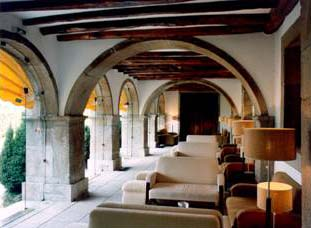

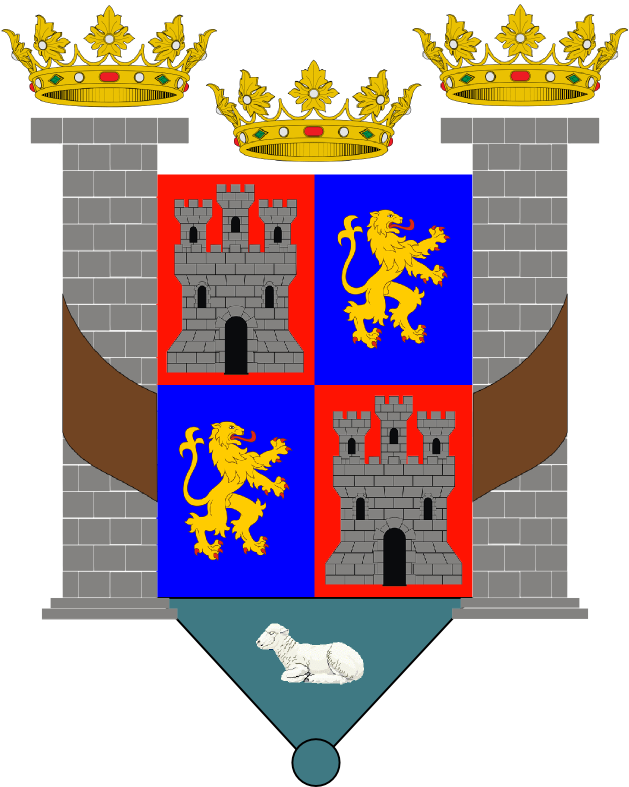
- Coat of arms

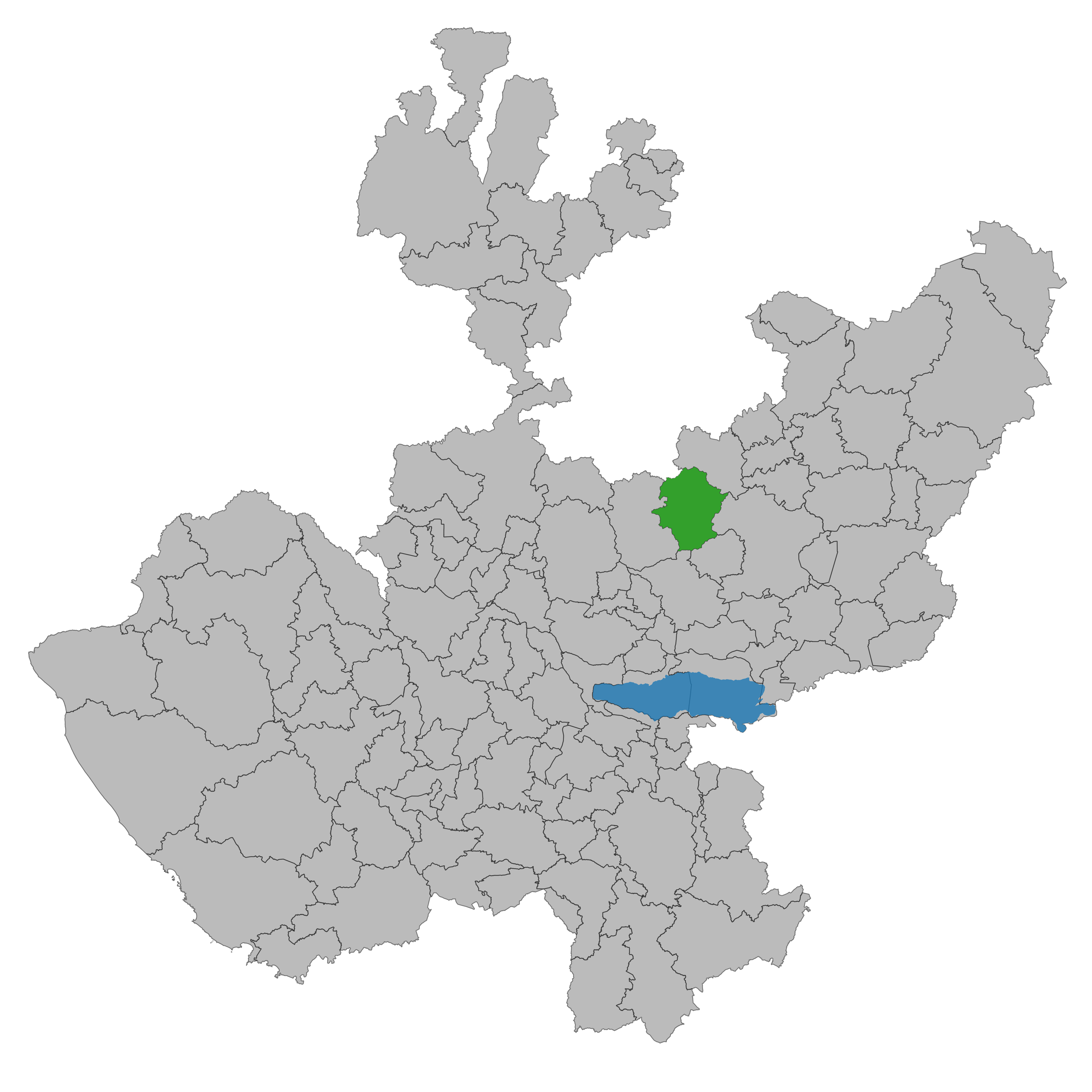
- Location of the municipality in Jalisco

- Location in Mexico Cuquío (Mexico)
- Coordinates: 20°55′44.4″N 103°01′22.27″W
- Country: Mexico
- State: Jalisco

Area
  - Total: 643 km^{2} (248 sq mi)
  - Town: 2.44 km^{2} (0.94 sq mi)

Population (2020 census)
  - Total: 17,820
  - Density: 27.7/km^{2} (71.8/sq mi)
  - Town: 5,011
  - Town density: 2,050/km^{2} (5,320/sq mi)

Cuquío is a town and municipality, in Jalisco in central-western Mexico. The municipality covers an area of 248 square miles (643 km^{2}). It limits to the North with the municipality of Yahualica and the State of Zacatecas; to the South, Zapotlanejo and Acatic; to the East, Yahualica and Tepatitlán; and to the West, Ixtlahuacán del Río. Its name derives from the word Cuixui, which in the Náhuatl language means kite, and is interpreted as "place of kites", or in Purépecha language, "place of frogs or toads". The foundation of the town is awarded to the Purépechas (Tarascans) who repeatedly ventured through these valleys after the Saltpeter War (1480-1510) (Guerra del Salitre). As a third version about the origins of the municipality name, it is well known that the tribe of coquias settled in La Cofradía, two kilometers (1.24 miles) from the current town, whose name is conjectured the denomination comes from. Cuquío also depended on the Tonalteca kingdom.

As of 2005, the municipality had a total population of 19,176.

== History ==
In 1530, Nuño de Guzmán conquered the region and established there his main operations centre. The headquarters of the Corregimiento was in the town of Tlacotlán until 1690 when it passed to Cuquío and there it lasted until Independence.

It is known that in 1695 the Mayor was Don Juan Polanco, and the construction of the temple began in 1762, ending in 1834.

In 1823 Cuquío was appointed a party with city hall; and in the decree of March 27, 1824, it was constituted as a Department in the then-newly created State of Jalisco, and had the status of a village (villa).

The decree of March 13, 1837 provided that Cuquío were a party seat. In September 1846 it was declared seat of one department of the Canton of Guadalajara.

== Coat of arms ==
The coat of arms dates from 1690 and is carved in quarry and embedded in one of the inner walls of the City Hall of Cuquío. It was previously on the facade of the house of the Corregidor of Cuquío.

The upper figure is an imperial crown of Spain. The coat of arms is quartered; in the first and fourth quarters, in gules field (red), a silver castle clarified of sable (black), and in the second and third quarters, in azure field (blue) a golden rampant lion, linguized and armed of gules (red) looking at the sinister side of the coat of arms. The two castles and two alternate lions represent the union of the former counties, later kingdoms, of Castile and León, carried out on June 22, 1037 by the marriage of Ferdinand the Great, Count of Castile and since that year King consort of León, with Doña Sancha, sovereign of the Kingdom of León.

In 1230 King Ferdinand III the Saint ordered the emblem to be bound.

Charles I of Spain and V of the Holy Roman Empire (1500-1558), king of Spain from 1516 to 1556 and emperor of the Holy Roman Empire from 1520 to 1558, added two columns of Hercules that symbolize the two empires of Europe and America carrying each one, two rolled bands, finishing off on the cusp with a crown, the band with the "Plus Ultra" motto refers to the discovery of America or New World, and the crown, to the conquest of this territory.

The coat of arms should be surrounded by the collar of the Order of the Golden Fleece, instituted in 1429 by Philip III, Duke of Burgundy, in France and introduced in Spain by the consort king of Castile Philip the Handsome, in 1504. But in the coat of arms the collar does not appear complete because the size of the stone did not allow it. This stone was chiselled at the end of the 17th century.

== Government ==
Its form of government is democratic and depends on the state and federal government. Elections are held every three years, when the municipal president and her/his council are elected.

On 2 March 2021, Analuci Martínez Saldívar, a former PAN councilwoman from Cuquío, was shot to death in the Prados Tepeyac neighborhood of the Zapopan municipality. It was known that Martínez, the also pre-candidate for the municipal presidency of Cuquío for the elections of 6 June 2021, had led several criminal complaints in 2015 against the then municipal president Adrián Cornelio González, for alleged diversions of resources that he would have committed during his first two terms.

=== Municipal presidents ===
Term	Municipal president	Political party	Notes
1928–1929	José Ayala		
1929	Ramón Salcido		
1930–1931	Ignacio Martín González	PNR	
1932	Ramón Sánchez G.	PNR	
1933	Ignacio Martín G.	PNR	
1934	Calixto Muñoz	PNR	
1935	Ignacio Martín G.	PNR	
1936–1937	Ramón Sigala Ramírez	PNR	
1938–1939	Sérbulo González Gómez	PRM	
1940	Epigmenio Ramos Preciado	PRM	
1941–1942	Catarino Olea Olea	PRM	
1943–1944	José Molina G.	PRM	
1945–1946	José Mora Muñoz	PRM	
1947–1948	José Molina G.	PRI	
1949–1952	Emigdio Sánchez González	PRI	
1953–1955	Miguel Pérez Verdín	PRI	
1956	Cipriano Gutiérrez Mora	PRI	
1956–1958	Martín Mora Plascencia	PRI	
1959–1960	José Mora Ramos	PRI	
1961	Martín Sánchez Sánchez	PRI	
1962–1964	J. Jesús Mercado Díaz	PRI	
1965–1970	J. Guadalupe Figueroa Gómez	PRI	
1971	J. Jesús Plascencia Sánchez	PRI	
1971–1973	J. Guadalupe Figueroa Gómez	PRI	
1974–1976	Senorino Sandoval Gómez	PRI	
01/01/1977–09/08/1979	Manuel Rodríguez Plascencia	PRI	Was defrocked by the Congress of the State
09/08/1979–31/12/1979	N/A		
01/01/1980–1982	José Francisco Mercado Mora	PRI	
1983–1985	Roberto Plascencia Canales	PRI	
1986–1989	Roberto Saavedra Gutiérrez	PRI	
1989–1992	Roberto Plascencia Pérez	PRI	
1992–1995	Héctor Manuel Figueroa Plascencia	PRD	
1995–1997	Roberto Gutiérrez Rodríguez	PRD	
1998–2000	José Luis Rubio García	PRD	
2001–2003	Héctor Manuel Figueroa Plascencia	PRD	
01/01/2004–31/12/2006	Adrián Cornelio González Fernández	PAN	
01/01/2007–31/12/2009	Carlos Gustavo Gutiérrez Rodríguez	PRI	
01/01/2010–30/09/2012	Adrián Cornelio González Fernández	Convergence	
01/10/2012–30/09/2015	Ma. Victoria Mercado Sánchez	PT; MC	Coalition "Alianza Progresista por Jalisco"
01/10/2015–30/09/2018	Adrián Cornelio González Fernández	PT	
01/10/2018–30/09/2021	Adrián Cornelio González Fernández	PT; Morena; PES	Coalition "Together We Will Make History"
01/10/2021–30/09/2024	Ubaldo Chávez Delgadillo	PRI	
01/10/2024–	Ubaldo Chávez Delgadillo	PAN; PRI; PRD	Coalition "Fuerza y Corazón por México" (Strength and Heart for Mexico); He was reelected

== Geography ==
=== Geology ===
The municipality consists of land belonging to the Tertiary and Quaternary periods, composed of sedimentary rocks, alluvial, residual and lacustrine soils.

=== Climate ===
The climate of the municipality is considered semi-dry, with dry winter and spring, and semi-warm with mild winter. The average annual temperature is 64.22 °F (17.9 °C), and has an average annual rainfall of 839.5 millimeters, with rainfall in June, July and August.

The prevailing winds are heading North to South. The average number of days with frost per year is 7.6.

Climate data for Cuquío (1991–2020 normals, extremes 1947–present)
Month	Jan	Feb	Mar	Apr	May	Jun	Jul	Aug	Sep	Oct	Nov	Dec	Year
Record high °C (°F)	36 (97)	33 (91)	39 (102)	39.5 (103.1)	45 (113)	39 (102)	38 (100)	36.1 (97.0)	36.1 (97.0)	36 (97)	35 (95)	33 (91)	45 (113)
Mean daily maximum °C (°F)	24.0 (75.2)	26.1 (79.0)	28.3 (82.9)	30.7 (87.3)	31.9 (89.4)	29.7 (85.5)	26.7 (80.1)	26.7 (80.1)	26.3 (79.3)	26.4 (79.5)	25.4 (77.7)	24.0 (75.2)	27.2 (81.0)
Daily mean °C (°F)	13.8 (56.8)	15.6 (60.1)	17.0 (62.6)	19.8 (67.6)	22.0 (71.6)	22.5 (72.5)	20.9 (69.6)	20.7 (69.3)	20.4 (68.7)	18.9 (66.0)	16.2 (61.2)	14.1 (57.4)	18.5 (65.3)
Mean daily minimum °C (°F)	3.7 (38.7)	5.1 (41.2)	5.8 (42.4)	8.9 (48.0)	12.0 (53.6)	15.3 (59.5)	15.0 (59.0)	14.7 (58.5)	14.6 (58.3)	11.4 (52.5)	7.0 (44.6)	4.3 (39.7)	9.8 (49.6)
Record low °C (°F)	−9.5 (14.9)	−7.5 (18.5)	−5.2 (22.6)	−5 (23)	2.5 (36.5)	4 (39)	4 (39)	1.4 (34.5)	6 (43)	−4 (25)	−6 (21)	−8 (18)	−9.5 (14.9)
Average precipitation mm (inches)	17.6 (0.69)	17.0 (0.67)	5.0 (0.20)	3.6 (0.14)	22.5 (0.89)	154.6 (6.09)	210.7 (8.30)	178.1 (7.01)	136.4 (5.37)	45.6 (1.80)	15.3 (0.60)	11.6 (0.46)	818.0 (32.20)
Average precipitation days	1.9	2.2	1.0	0.8	3.2	14.6	19.5	17.7	14.3	5.4	2.2	1.7	84.5
Source: Servicio Meteorológico Nacional

=== Hydrography ===
This region belongs to the Lerma-Chapala-Santiago hydrological basin, Juchipila-Bolaños sub-basin, Río Verde and Grande Belén.

Its main stream is the Río Verde (Green River). It has streams of permanent flow: Atenguillo; flow streams only in the rainy season: Los Gigantes, Contla, Achichilco, Zapote, Ocotic, Blanco, Grande, El Salto, Garza (Heron), Pera (Pear) and Los Hornos.

Its main reservoirs are Los Gigantes, González, and Cuacuala dams.

=== Soil ===
The composition of the soil corresponds to the type of euphoric Planosol and haplic Feozem as dominant; and the type of ferric Luvisol as an associate.

=== Natural resources ===
The natural wealth that the municipality has is represented by 39,000 acres (15,900 hectares) of forests where oak, holm oak, and pine species predominate. The wooded areas known as La Silleta and Plan de Potrerillos stand out for their richness and extension. There are natural forests located in San Gabriel, La Silleta hill and Plan de Potrerillos table, mostly composed of oak, holm oak and pine.

Its mineral resources are deposits of silver, magnesium, lime and quarry. Most of the land has an agricultural use, land tenure is mostly private property.

In the fauna, species such as deer, fox, squirrel, coyote, tigrillo and various birds such as quails, owls and mourning doves stand out, among others.

== Economy ==
The municipality of Cuquío bases its economy on different sectors. Agriculture is an economic activity that is exercised in the municipality, the crops include corn, sorghum, oats, peel tomatoes, and beans. Cattle of milk and meat, pig, goat, sheep, poultry and small-scale beekeeping are raised. The main industrial activities in the municipality are pottery, manufacture of wooden objects, huaraches and embroidery. Pine and oak are exploited, those woods are partly transported to Guadalajara, the state capital, and the rest is destined to primary uses in the municipality. Mining is another economic activity, metallic minerals are represented by deposits of magnesium and silver. Of the nonmetals, there are deposits of lime and quarry stone. The municipality also practices fishing due to its hydrographic situation, whose main waters are the Lerma-Chapala-Santiago hydrological basin, Juchipila-Bolaños sub-basin, Río Verde and Grande Belén. Small-scale carp and catfish species are caught and for local consumption. Tourism offers inhabitants and tourists its archeological zone, as well as the colonial monuments that exist in the municipality, religious, historical buildings, and haciendas. It also has beautiful natural landscapes worth admiring. In trade, activities predominate in the sale of essential products and mixed stores that sell small-scale items. In the service sector, the inhabitants provide financial, technical, communal, social, personal and maintenance services.

== Historical monuments ==
Among the architectural monuments of the municipality is the Parish Church of San Felipe dating from the 17th century. In the center of the municipal seat is a work that the Jesuits left unfinished when they were expelled from New Spain in 1767. Religious architecture also highlights the Temple of the Sacred Heart and the Convent of Dolores. Among the buildings of a civil nature can be mentioned the Hacienda Sin Nombre (With No Name), the Hacienda del Burro de Oro (Golden Donkey) and the nursing home of San José. There are archaeological remains in an area called La Cofradía that, due to lack of conservation, tend to disappear. And among the historical ones is the house where Miguel Hidalgo y Costilla spent the night in January 1811. The house where Mexican martyrs San Justino Orona Madrigal and San Atilano Cruz Alvarado were murdered in the community of Las Cruces.

== Culture ==
=== Popular feasts ===
- The annual fair in honor of San Felipe, from May 3 to 11. "Fiestas de Mayo" are among the most important in the region.
- The festivities of the Virgin of Guadalupe, from December 1 to 12.
- The national celebrations of the month of September. The Queen of the National Holidays is crowned.

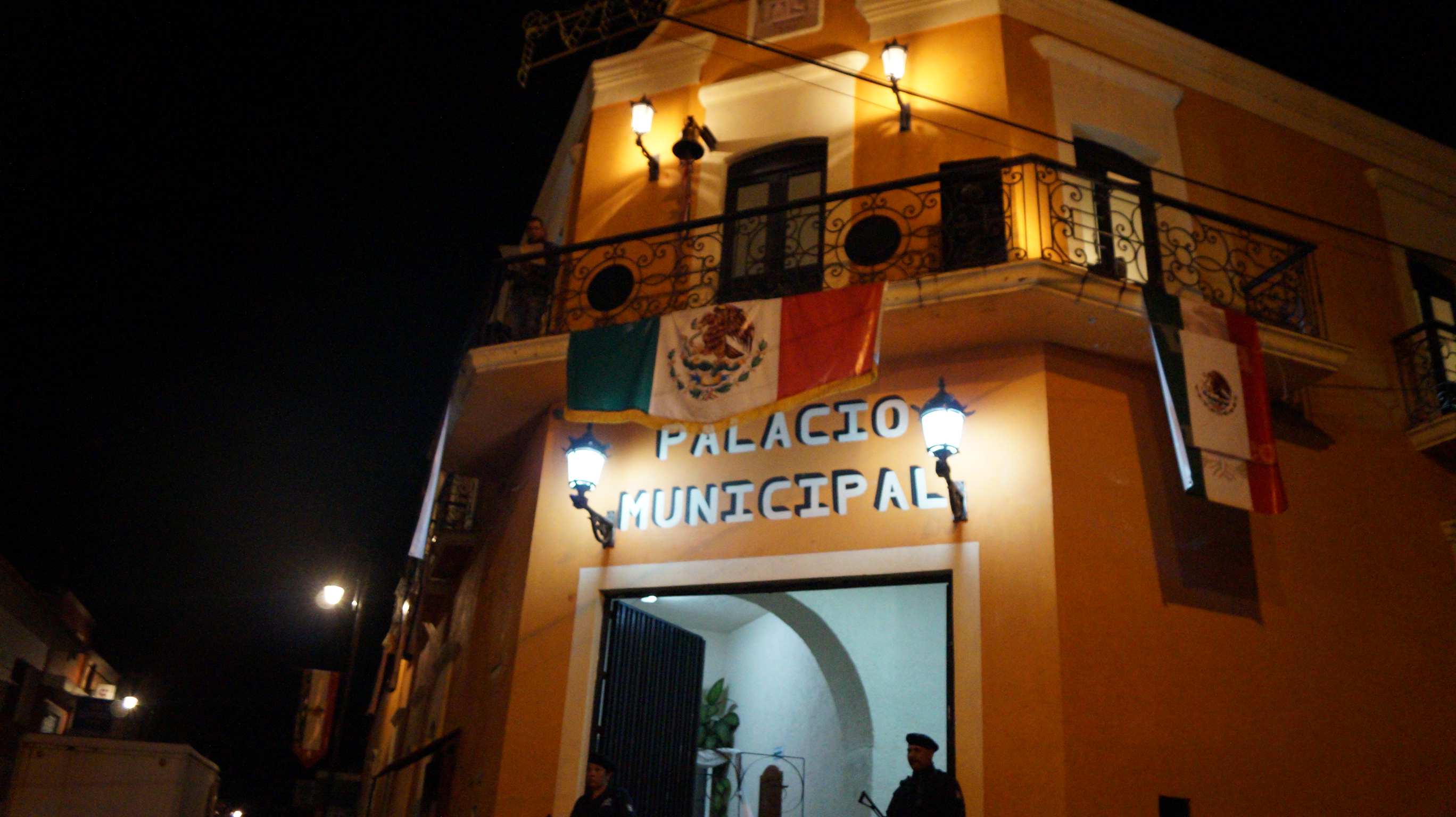
National Holidays in Cuquío. Photo: Miguel Ángel Avilés

- Patron celebrations in El Cuatro, from January 28 to 30.
- In the community of Teponahuasco a pilgrimage is made from December 18 to 20. In addition to the pilgrimage of the image of the "Lord of Teponahuasco" that takes place on the first Sunday of July, from his sanctuary in the community of Teponahuasco to the Parish Church of San Felipe Apóstol, and his return on the first Sunday of October from the Parish Church of San Felipe Apóstol to his sanctuary in the community of Teponahuasco.
- Feast of the Holy Martyrs. Last Saturday of June, pilgrimage with the relics of the martyrs San Justino Orona Madrigal and San Atilano Cruz from the community of Las Cruces to the Parish Church of San Felipe Apóstol in the municipal seat.
- Feast in Cuacuala. The last Sunday of January it is venerated Santo Santiago, the patron of the town, dances of the Tastoanes come in addition to the visit of the absent people (those who have migrated to the United States), there are dances, fireworks, and popular festival. This day, buses from different parts of the Guadalajara metropolitan area travel carrying a good number of visitors to the traditional town of Cuquio.
- Feast in La Esperanza on February 14, day of the Virgin of Hope.
- Feast in San Juan on March 10, day of the Precious Blood of Christ, dance from March 8 to 16.
- Feast at Las Cruces on October 24, San Rafael day.
- Feast in La Villita on December 12, Day of the Virgin of Guadalupe.
- Fiesta de Juchitlán in honor of San Bartolo, from August 15 to 24.
- Fiesta de los Arcos on January 20, day of the Virgin of Guadalupe.
- Feast in San José de los Molina, March 19.
- Feast in the community of El Terrero in Honor of the Risen Christ (celebrated one week after Holy Week).
- Patron celebrations in honor of the Virgin of Guadalupe, in the Colonia Lázaro Cárdenas. December 12.
- Festivities of the Community of Monte de Jala, in honor of the Virgen del Carmen, on July 16.
- Patron celebrations of Rancho El Pirul, in honor of the Sacred Heart of Jesus, on June 6, dances come from the community of La Laguna.

=== Legend ===
There is a legend that tells that a large shipment of gold and silver, in seven mules, is buried in a cave of Cerro del Truco (Hill of the Trick) having sealed the "door" of said cave with mortar mixed with the blood of the seven mules. This treasure was the product of theft by a sheaf that assaulted haciendas and royal roads and as it is said only two of the members of the sheaf were injured in a fight and were fleeing when they finished burying the treasure, dying shortly after, and no one knows the exact place of this cave. So there have been many adventurers who want to find this treasure, without having achieved it. The inhabitants of the nearby communities have remained alert from their homes to see when the "door" of the cave opens, but they fear suddenly seeing themselves in the situation of a well-known saying ("everything or nothing") for what referring to the treasure of that cave, since whoever manages to see that wealth once inside must take everything or else must leave even what he/she brings. This is how the charm of Cerro del Truco is heard.

=== Traditions and customs ===
A Christ is venerated which some Indians found while walking in Cuquío, named as Black Christ of Teponahuasco. For this, traditional pilgrimages are made every Friday of the year. Every first Sunday of July, the Christ is taken to the temple of San Felipe Apóstol as a tradition of the people by a well-known legend there. And on the first Sunday of October, he is returned to his temple in Teponahuasco.

In Cuquío there is also the Cuauhquioc Folkloric Group, a ballet directed by Fernando Ramos Barajas, which currently has 24 members, youth and adults; it is the result of the effort and work of nine generations, who have given life to traditions for thirty years, dances of the peoples of the country.

In its thirty years of life, the Cuauhquioc Folkloric Ballet has alternated with folk groups from Ecuador and Colombia, as well as with important artists of popular culture such as Paloma del Río, Valente Pastor, Hilda Aguirre and Mariachi Vargas de Tecalitlán, among others.

Recently, some folk groups have emerged to enrich the culture of Cuquío, sponsored by the cultural mission offered by the Secretariat of Education, managing to cross borders and visiting some cities such as Milwaukee, Wisconsin, United States. Among the participating communities are El Terrero, Teponahuasco, and the municipal seat.

=== Arts and crafts ===
Wooden objects such as chairs, tables and doors are made; paper flowers, embroidery, two-needle and crochet fabrics; clothing, pottery, glazing, wool blankets, baskets of reeds and wood. In Teponahuasco pots and other articles are made out of clay.

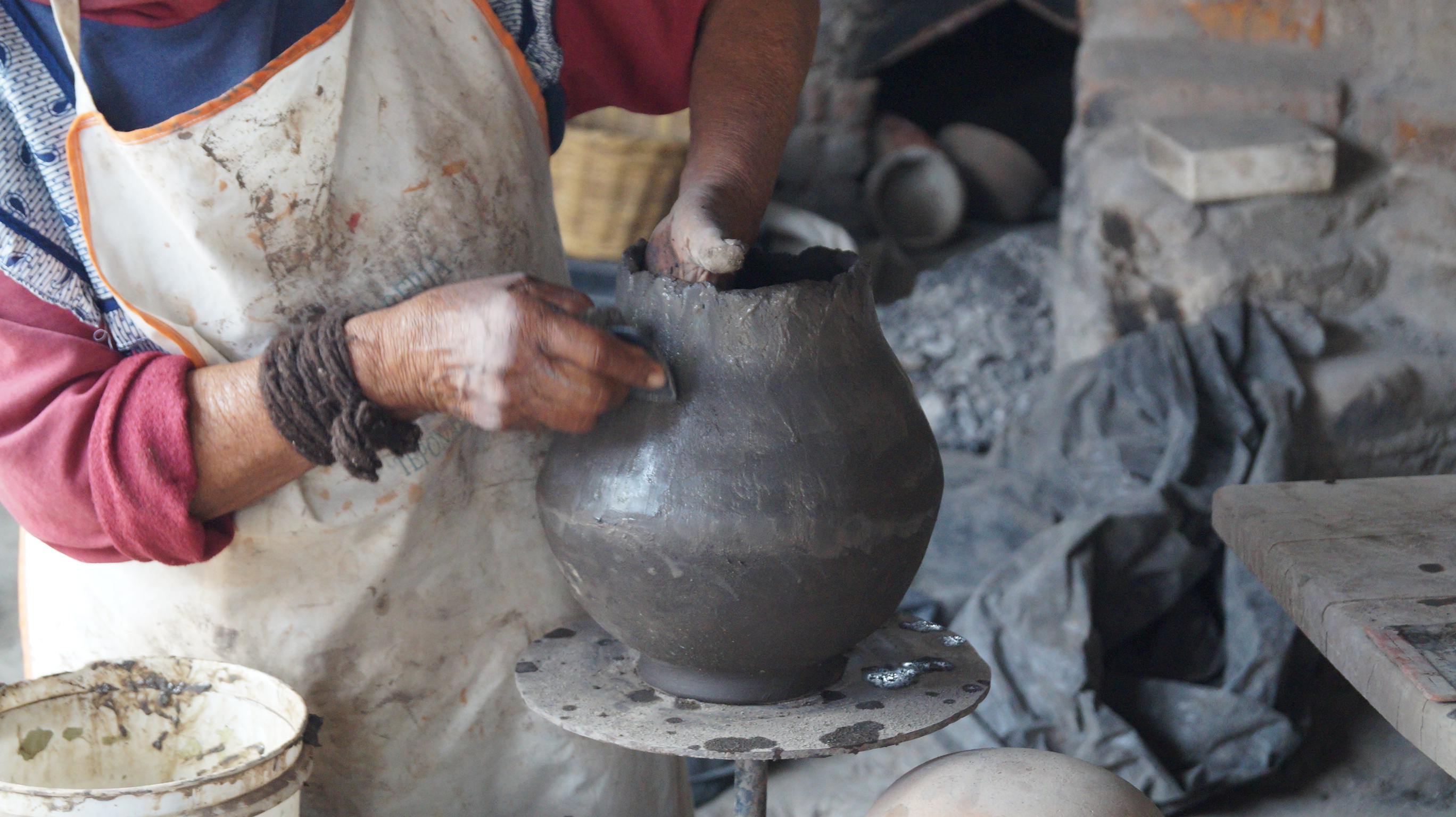
Teponahuasco pottery. Photo: Miguel Ángel Avilés

=== Gastronomy ===
Food: Goat meat birria, chicken or turkey birria, arepas, panela, and empanochadas (wheat flour and piloncillo bread) and the famous cotorras, "guaraches", "picones" (fluffy sweet breads, raised in a cone shape), and "birotes" (salty wheat flour breads, soft and fluffy on the inside, and hard on the outside).

Sweets: Fruits in syrup.

Drinks: Tequila and mezcal.

Teponahuasco and its wheat flour chips.

Turkey with mole.

Caramel.

Tacos in the market.

Sliced bread.

Corn tamales.

== Tourist attractions ==
You can admire many colonial monuments such as the parish church of San Felipe; the temple of the Sacred Heart and the Convent of Dolores, the house where Miguel Hidalgo y Costilla spent the night. The Hacienda Burro de Oro and the Hacienda Sin Nombre, in addition to Atrial Crossings and its historic center with colonial-style mansions.

Its natural heritage is formed by the landscapes of the hill of La Silleta, the Los Gigantes dam, as well as the "Agua Caliente" hot spring stream, and the Cuacuala dam.

== How to get there ==
The distance between Guadalajara and Cuquío is of 49 miles (79 kilometers). In order to get to this municipality leaving from Guadalajara, it is recommended to reach Avenida Alcalde, exit towards Zacatecas, after passing toward the North the Anillo Periférico, the above-mentioned avenue takes the name Carretera a Saltillo, id est, Federal Free Highway 54; follow the same direction to Ixtlahuacán del Río, and, before reaching the seat of this municipality you will find a junction with the Jalisco State Highway 201 Cuquío; please turn right to take this one. The distance from this junction to Cuquío is of approximately 19 miles (30 km). The Guadalajara-Cuquío journey takes about 1:40 hours, due to the winding road.
