= 2021 Toulouse Olympique season =

Rugby league season

- Championship Rank: 1st
- Play-off result: Million Pound Game Winners
- Challenge Cup: Did not enter
- 2021 record: Wins: 14; draws: 0; losses: 0
- Points scored: For: 698; against: 124

Team information
- Chairman: Bernard Sarrazain
- Head Coach: Sylvain Houles
- Captain: Johnathon Ford
- Stadium: Stade Ernest Wallon
- High attendance: 9,235 vs. Featherstone Rovers

Top scorers
- Tries: Matthieu Jussaume (14)
- Goals: Mark Kheirallah (80)
- Points: Mark Kheirallah (184)

This article details Toulouse Olympique rugby league football club's 2021 season. This was Toulouse's fourth consecutive season in the Championship. Toulouse did not take part in the Challenge Cup this season.

== Championship ==
=== League table ===
Pos	Team	Pld	W	D	L	PF	PA	PP	Pts	PCT	Qualification (Note: Teams must have played at least 70% of scheduled fixtures (16 matches) to qualify for the play-offs. Fixtures involving Toulouse that are cancelled due to quarantine restrictions do not count against either team involved in respect of the 70% requirement.)
1	Toulouse Olympique (Note: Toulouse were awarded the fixture against London scheduled for 17 April after London declined to travel to France. Toulouse are awarded the two competition points and for points scored percentage the score is recorded as a 24–0 win for Toulouse. The game does not count towards the number of games played by London to determine eligibility for the play-offs)	14	14	0	0	698	124	562.9	28	100.00	Championship Leaders' Shield & advance to semi-final
2	Featherstone Rovers	21	20	0	1	943	292	322.9	38 (Note: Featherstone deducted 2 points for breach of the RFL Operational Rules in March 2021.)	90.48	Advance to semi-final
3	Halifax Panthers	21	13	0	8	528	354	149.2	26	61.90	Advance to eliminators
4	Batley Bulldogs	21	13	0	8	561	411	136.5	26	61.90	Advance to eliminators
5	Bradford Bulls	20	12	0	8	514	501	102.6	24	60.00	Advance to eliminators
6	Whitehaven	22	12	1	9	502	524	95.8	25	56.82	Advance to eliminators
7	London Broncos	20	11	1	8	552	579	95.3	21 (Note: London deducted 2 points for breach of the RFL Operational Rules in failing for fulfil the fixture against Toulouse in April 2021.)	52.50	
8	Widnes Vikings	21	9	1	11	494	534	92.5	19	45.24	
9	York City Knights	20	9	0	11	502	477	105.2	18	45.00	
10	Dewsbury Rams	21	8	1	12	360	608	59.2	17	40.48	
11	Newcastle Thunder	20	7	1	12	431	627	68.7	15	37.50	
12	Sheffield Eagles	20	5	3	12	420	665	63.2	13	32.50	
13	Oldham	21	2	1	18	308	748	41.2	5	11.90	Relegated to League 1
14	Swinton Lions	22	2	1	19	404	773	52.3	5	11.36	Relegated to League 1

Rules for classification: 1) win percentage; 2) points scored percentage (points scored divided by points conceded).

=== Championship results ===
W Win D Draw L Loss – Postponed

Championship results
Date	Round	Verses	H/A	Venue	Result	Score	Tries	Goals	Att	Live on TV	Report
3 April 2021	1	York City Knights	A	York Community Stadium	W	21-6	Peyroux, Garbutt, Bretherton	Marion 1C 3P, White 1DG	Closed Doors	Our League	Report
17 April 2021	2	London Broncos	H	Stade Ernest Wallon	W	24-0	Walkover	-	—	—	Report
25 April 2021	3	Halifax Panthers	A	Shay Stadium	W	34-44	Vaivai (2), Bretherton, White (2), Dixon, Casty	Marion 6C 2P,	Closed Doors	Our League	Report
1 May 2021	4	Featherstone Rovers	H	Stade Ernest Wallon	–	P-P	Postponed due to COVID-19	-	—	-	Report
9 May 2021	5	Widnes Vikings	H	Heywood Road	W	70-0	White, Jussaume, Sangare, Dixon (3), Hitchcox, Garbutt, Flovie, Pelissier (3), Schaumkel	Marion 9C	Closed Doors	Our League	Report
16 May 2021	6	Whitehaven R.L.F.C.	A	Recreation Ground	W	66-0	Jussaume (2), White, Dixon, Marion (2), Pelissier, Vaivai (2), Peyroux, Hitchcox, Flovie (2)	Marion 6C, Flovie 1C	Closed Doors	Our League	Report
22 May 2021	7	Swinton Lions	H	Heywood Road	W	66-18	Casty, Marion, Jussaume, Schaumkel (3), Bretherton, Garbutt, Pelissier, Kheirallah, Peyroux, Ford	Kheirallah 9C	—	Our League	Report
29 May 2021	8	Newcastle Thunder	H	Stade Ernest Wallon	–	P-P	Postponed due to COVID-19	-	-	-	Report
13 June 2021	9	Dewsbury Rams	A	Crown Flatt	W	56-12	Jussaume (2), Hitchcox (3), Pelissier (2), Garbutt, Sangare, Pezet	Kheirallah 7C,1P	-	Not Live	Report
19 June 2021	10	Bradford Bulls	H	Stade Ernest-Wallon	–	P-P	Postponed due to COVID-19	-	-	-	Report
27 June 2021	11	Sheffield Eagles	A	Belle Vue	W	54-6	Vaivai, Kheirallah, Bergal (2), Jussaume (2), Pelissier, Hansen, Armitage, Marion	Kheirallah 7C	-	Not Live	Report
3 July 2021	12	Oldham R.L.F.C.	H	Stade Ernest Wallon	–	P-P	Postponed due to COVID-19	-	-	-	Report
11 July 2021	13	Batley Bulldogs	A	Mount Pleasant	W	32-12	Hansen, Schaumkel, Sangare, Vaivai (2), Jussaume	Kheirallah 4C	-	Not Live	Report
24 July 2021	14	Dewsbury Rams	H	Stade Ernest Wallon	–	P-P	Postponed due to COVID-19	-	-	-	Report
1 August 2021	15	Featherstone Rovers	A	Post Office Road	W	23-6	Peyroux (2), Sangare, Casty	Kheirallah 3C Gigot 1DG	3,500	Not Live	Report
8 August 2021	16	London Broncos	A	Trailfinders Sports Ground	W	66-6	Marion, Vaivai (3), Peyroux (2), Schaumkel, Ford (2), Bretherton, Gigot	Kheirallah 11C	-	Our League	Report
14 August 2021	17	Halifax Panthers	H	Stade Ernest Wallon	–	P-P	Postponed due to COVID-19	-	-	-	Report
22 August 2021	18	Oldham R.L.F.C.	A	Bower Fold	W	34-6	Vaivai, Sangare, Pelissier (2), Peyroux, Garbutt	Kheirallah 5C	-	Not Live	Report
28 August 2021	19	Batley Bulldogs	H	Stade Ernest Wallon	–	P=P	Postponed due to COVID-19	-	-	-	Report
5 September 2021	20	Bradford Bulls	A	Crown Flatt	W	60-6	Armitage (2), Hitchcox, Bergal, Navarrete, Sangare (2), Bretherton, White, Kheirallah (2)	Kheirallah 8C	-	Not Live	Report
11 September 2021	21	York City Knights	H	Stade Ernest Wallon	–	P-P	Postponed due to COVID-19	-	-	-	Report
18 September 2021	22	Newcastle Thunder	A	Kingston Park	W	82-12	Hitchcox (4), Bretherton (2), Peyroux, Jussaume (2), Sangare (2), Paulo, Navarrete, Kheirallah, Marion	Kheirallah 11C	-	Our League	Report

=== Play-offs ===
Play-off results
Date	Round	Verses	H/A	Venue	Result	Score	Tries	Goals	Att	Live on TV	Report
2 October 2021	SF	Batley Bulldogs	H	Stade Ernest Wallon	W	51-12	Casty, Gigot, Bretherton, Vaivai (2), Kheirallah, Sangare, Jussaume, Garbutt	Kheirallah 7C, Gigot 1DG	6,871	Sky Sports	Report
10 October 2021	GF	Featherstone Rovers	H	Stade Ernest Wallon	W	34-12	Jussaume 2, Schaumkel, Hansen, Ford	Kheirallah 3C 4P	9,235	Sky Sports	Report

== Players ==
=== Player appearances ===
FB = Fullback	C = Centre	W = Winger	SO = Stand Off	SH = Scrum half	P = Prop	H = Hooker	SR = Second Row	LF = Loose forward	I = Interchange

No	Player	1	3	5	6	7	9	11	13	15	16	18	20	22	SF	GF
1	Mark Kheirallah	FB				FB	FB	FB	FB	FB	FB	FB	FB	FB	FB	FB
2	Jy Hitchcox			W	W	W	W			W	W		W	W	W	W
3	Junior Vaivai	C	C	C	C	C	C	C	C	C	C	C		C	C	C
4	Matthieu Jussaume	C	C	C	C	C	C	C	C	C	C	C	C	C	C	C
5	Paul Marcon															
6	Johnathon Ford	SH	SH	SO	SO	SH	SO	SO	SO	SO	SO	SH	SO	SO	SH	SH
7	Lucas Albert													I		
8	Remi Casty	I	LF	LF	LF	P	P	P	P	P			P	P	P	P
9	Lloyd White	H	H	H	H	H				H	H		H	H	H	H
10	Harrison Hansen	P		P	P	P	SR	SR	P	P		P	P	P	P	P
11	Andrew Dixon	SR	SR	SR	SR			SR	SR	SR	SR	SR				
12	Dominique Peyroux	SR			SR	SR			SR	SR	SR	SR	SR	SR	SR	SR
13	Anthony Marion	SO	SO	SH	SH	LF	LF	LF	H	LF	LF			LF	LF	LF
14	Eloi Pellisier	I	I	I	I	I	H	H	I	I		H	I		I	I
15	Maxime Puech	I	P				P	P			P	I				
16	Joe Bretherton	P	SR	SR	P	SR			LF		P		SR	SR	SR	SR
17	Joseph Paulo	LF					SR	I	I	I	I	LF	LF	I	I	I
18	Mitch Garbutt	I	I	I	I	I		I	I	I		I	I		I	I
19	Bastien Ader															
20	Ilias Bergal	W	W				W	W	W			W	W	W		
21	Latrell Schaumkel	W	FB	FB	FB	W			W	W	W	W			W	W
23	Justin Sangare		I	P	I	I	I	I	I	I	I	P	I	I	I	I
24	Guy Armitage							W					C			
25	Max Garcia		I	I(27)		I(27)	I(27)									
26	Hugo Pezet						I	I				I				
27	Clement Boyer		P													
28	Romain Navarrete										I	I	I	I		
28a	Hugo Salabio			I	I											
30	Benjamin Laguerre		W													
30a	Jordan Flovie			W	W											
31	Tony Gigot					SO	SH	SH	SH	SH	SH	SO	SH	SH	SO	SO

=== 2021 transfers ===
Gains

Player	Club	Contract	Date
(Australia) Mitch Garbutt	Hull KR	1 Year	July 2020
(New Zealand) Latrell Schaumkel	Villeneuve XIII RLLG	1 Year	August 2020
(England) Ben Reynolds	Leigh Centurions	2 Years	August 2020
(France) Éloi Pélissier	London Broncos	2 Years	November 2020
(Samoa) Joseph Paulo	St Helens	2 Years	November 2020
(Samoa) Dominique Peyroux	St Helens	2 Years	November 2020
(England) Andrew Dixon	Toronto Wolfpack	2 Years	December 2020
(France) Remi Casty	Catalans Dragons	1 Year	January 2021
(England) Guy Armitage	London Broncos	1 Year	March 2021
(France) Tony Gigot	Palau Broncos	1 Year	May 2021
(France) Lucas Albert	Carcassonne	1 Year	June 2021
(France) Romain Navarrete	London Broncos	2 Years	July 2021

Losses

Player	Club	Contract	Date
(France) Stan Robin	Villeneuve Leopards	1 Year	June 2020
(France) Tony Maurel	Limoux Grizzlies	2 Years	July 2020
(Samoa) Con Mika	Villeneuve Leopards	1 Year	July 2020
(France) Clement Boyer	Released	N/A	August 2020
(France) William Barthau	Retirement	N/A	August 2020
(New Zealand) James Bell	Leigh Centurions	1 Year	November 2020
(Samoa) Frank Winterstein	Left	N/A	January 2021
(Samoa) Paterika Vaivai	Released	N/A	February 2021
(Wales) Ben Evans	Bradford Bulls	2 Years	March 2021
(England) Ben Reynolds	Leigh Centurions	1 Year	March 2021
