= 2021 RFL Championship season results =

The Rugby Football League (RFL) 2021 Championship comprised 22-rounds in the regular season with a four-round play-off post-season contested by the top six clubs to determine which club would be promoted to the 2022 Super League.

== Regular season ==
=== Round 1 ===
Betfred Championship: round one
Home	Score	Away	Match Information
Home	Score	Away	Date and Time	Venue	Referee	Attendance
Halifax Panthers	47–14	London Broncos	2 April 2021, 17:00	The MBI Shay	G. Hewer	— (Note: behind closed doors, due to the COVID-19 pandemic in the United Kingdom)
Oldham	28–20	Swinton Lions	2 April 2021, 17:15	Bower Fold	C. Worsley	—
Featherstone Rovers	28–18	Batley Bulldogs	2 April 2021, 19:30	Millennium Stadium	J. Smith	—
York City Knights	6–21	Toulouse Olympique	3 April 2021, 16:30	York Community Stadium	T. Grant	—
Dewsbury Rams	17–8	Whitehaven RLFC	3 April 2021, 19:30	Tetley's Stadium	A. Moore	—
Sheffield Eagles	50–12	Bradford Bulls	4 April 2021, 12:45	Keepmoat Stadium	J. Vella	—
Newcastle Thunder	30–30	Widnes Vikings	4 April 2021, 17:15	Kingston Park	M. Griffiths	—

=== Round 2 ===
Betfred Championship: round two
Home	Score	Away	Match Information
Home	Score	Away	Date and Time	Venue	Referee	Attendance
Batley Bulldogs	48–10	Oldham	17 April 2021, 12:45	Mount Pleasant	J. Vella	— (Note: behind closed doors, due to the COVID-19 pandemic in the United Kingdom)
Toulouse Olympique	24–0 (Note: The RFL announced in March that under the COVID-19 quarantine regulations in England there was no bar to the match taking place. London declined to travel to France to play so, under the RFL regulations, London forfeited the game with the two competition points being awarded to Toulouse and the result recorded as a 24–0 win for the French side. The match does not count towards London's number of games played towards qualification to the play-offs.)	London Broncos	—	Stade Ernest-Wallon	—	—
Widnes Vikings	14–22	Dewsbury Rams	17 April 2021, 17:30	DCBL Stadium	C. Worsley	—
Swinton Lions	6–36	Featherstone Rovers	18 April 2021, 12:45	Heywood Road	A. Moore	—
Whitehaven RLFC	29–20	Newcastle Thunder	18 April 2021, 15:00	Recreation Ground	J. Smith	—
Bradford Bulls	27–26	Halifax Panthers	18 April 2021, 17:15	Tetley's Stadium	T. Grant	—
York City Knights	14–20	Sheffield Eagles	18 April 2021, 19:30	York Community Stadium	G. Hewer	—

=== Round 3 ===
Betfred Championship: round three
Home	Score	Away	Match Information
Home	Score	Away	Date and Time	Venue	Referee	Attendance
London Broncos	38–24	Oldham	24 April 2021, 14:00	The Rock	M. Mannifield	— (Note: behind closed doors, due to the COVID-19 pandemic in the United Kingdom)
Batley Bulldogs	48–16	Widnes Vikings	24 April 2021, 16:00	Mount Pleasant	G. Hewer	—
Swinton Lions	16–64	York City Knights	25 April 2021, 12:45	Heywood Road	M. Rossleigh	—
Featherstone Rovers	48–14	Whitehaven RLFC	25 April 2021, 15:00	Millennium Stadium	A. Moore	—
Halifax Panthers	34–44	Toulouse Olympique	25 April 2021, 15:00	The Shay	J. Smith	—
Newcastle Thunder	24–16	Sheffield Eagles	25 April 2021, 15:00	Kingston Park	J. Vella	—
Bradford Bulls	35–14	Dewsbury Rams	25 April 2021, 19:30	Tetley's Stadium	S. Mikalauskas	—

=== Round 4 ===
Betfred Championship: round four
Home	Score	Away	Match Information
Home	Score	Away	Date and Time	Venue	Referee	Attendance
Oldham	16–12	Halifax Panthers	1 May 2021, 12:45	Bower Fold	G. Hewer	— (Note: behind closed doors, due to the COVID-19 pandemic in the United Kingdom)
Sheffield Eagles	20–20	London Broncos	1 May 2021, 15:00	Keepmoat Stadium	B. Thaler	—
Toulouse Olympique	P–P (Note: Under RFL COVID-19 protocols part-time teams are not obliged to travel to Toulouse until French and UK government relax travel and quarantine restrictions)	Featherstone Rovers	1 May 2021, 15:00	Stade Ernest-Wallon		—
Newcastle Thunder	16–28	Batley Bulldogs	2 May 2021, 12:45	Kingston Park	A. Moore	—
Whitehaven	22–30	Bradford Bulls	2 May 2021, 15:00	LEL Arena	J. Vella	—
Widnes Vikings	46–10	Swinton Lions	2 May 2021, 17:15	Halton Stadium	J. Smith	—
Dewsbury Rams	20–30	York City Knights	2 May 2021, 19:30	Tetley's Stadium	T. Grant	—

=== Round 5 ===
Betfred Championship: round five
Home	Score	Away	Match Information
Home	Score	Away	Date and Time	Venue	Referee	Attendance
Sheffield Eagles	18–30	Batley Bulldogs	7 May 2021, 19:45	Keepmoat Stadium	G. Hewer	— (Note: behind closed doors, due to the COVID-19 pandemic in the United Kingdom)
Oldham	4–36	Whitehaven	8 May 2021, 12:45	Bower Fold	S. Mikalauskas	—
Swinton Lions	22–23	Bradford Bulls	9 May 2021, 11:45	Heywood Road	M. Griffiths	—
London Broncos	50–30	Newcastle Thunder	9 May 2021, 15:00	Trailfinders Sports Ground	J. Smith	—
Toulouse Olympique	70–0	Widnes Vikings	9 May 2021, 15:00	Heywood Road (Note: Match being played on neutral ground in England to reduced impact in teams due to COVID-19 quarantine regulations)	T. Grant	—
Dewsbury Rams	0–36	Halifax Panthers	9 May 2021, 17:15	Tetley's Stadium	A. Moore	—
York City Knights	12–16	Featherstone Rovers	9 May 2021, 19:30	York Community Stadium	C. Kendall	—

=== Round 6 ===
Limited attendances by home supporters only were allowed from Monday 17 May 2021.

Betfred Championship: round six
Home	Score	Away	Match Information
Home	Score	Away	Date and Time	Venue	Referee	Attendance
Batley Bulldogs	6–40	London Broncos	15 May 2021, 14:00	Fox's Biscuits Stadium	T. Grant	— (Note: behind closed doors, due to the COVID-19 pandemic in the United Kingdom)
Whitehaven	0–66	Toulouse Olympique	16 May 2021, 15:00	LEL Arena	J. Smith	—
Widnes Vikings	14–35	York City Knights	16 May 2021, 15:00	Halton Stadium	G. Hewer	—
Swinton Lions	18–20	Dewsbury Rams	17 May 2021, 19:45	Heywood Road	C. Worsley	416
Featherstone Rovers	68–0	Oldham	17 May 2021, 20:00	LD Nutrition Stadium	J. Vella	1,684
Halifax Panthers	46–12	Sheffield Eagles	6 June 2021, 12:45 (Note: Match originally scheduled for 15 May, was postponed on 11 May after two Sheffield players tested positive for COVID-19 and five others identified as close contacts. With seven players ruled out, the RFL COVID-19 protocol allows for postponement of the game.)	The MBi Shay	R. Hicks	734
Bradford Bulls	31–12	Newcastle Thunder	6 June 2021, 15:00 (Note: Originally scheduled for 17 May, the match was postponed by mutual consent to 6 June.)	Odsal Stadium	J. Child	3,562

=== Round 7 ===
Betfred Championship: round seven
Home	Score	Away	Match Information
Home	Score	Away	Date and Time	Venue	Referee	Attendance (Note: Limited attendances allowed but by home fans only.)
Toulouse Olympique	66–18	Swinton Lions	22 May 2021, 15:00	Heywood Road (Note: Although this is a home fixture for Toulouse, the match was played at Swinton by mutual consent due to travel restrictions relating to COVID-19.)	J. Smith	186
London Broncos	8–33	Bradford Bulls	23 May 2021, 15:00	Trailfinders Sports Ground	J. Vella	533
Newcastle Thunder	0–32	Halifax Panthers	23 May 2021, 15:00	Kingston Park	G. Hewer	604
Widnes Vikings	44–6	Whitehaven	23 May 2021, 15:00	Halton Stadium	J. McMullen	1,043
York City Knights	34–6	Oldham	23 May 2021, 15:00	York Community Stadium	N. Bennett	1,000
Sheffield Eagles	18–50	Featherstone Rovers	23 May 2021, 15:30	Keepmoat Stadium	A. Moore	620
Dewsbury Rams	10–38	Batley Bulldogs	15 July 2021, 19:30 (Note: Postponed by mutual consent from original date of 23 May.)	Tetley's Stadium	M. Mannifield	1,021

=== Round 8 ===
Betfred Championship: round eight
Home	Score	Away	Match Information
Home	Score	Away	Date and Time	Venue	Referee	Attendance (Note: Limited attendances only due to COVID-19 restrictions)
Toulouse Olympique	C–C	Newcastle Thunder	— (Note: Match originally scheduled for 29 May but postponed due to COVID-19 restrictions on travel to France from the UK. Subsequently re-arranged for 17 July but continuing quarantine rules forced another postponement. With no free dates left in the season calendar the fixture was cancelled and not played.)
Batley Bulldogs	26–12	Swinton Lions	30 May 2021, 15:00	Fox's Biscuits Stadium	G. Hewer	930
Bradford Bulls	37–18	York City Knights	30 May 2021, 15:00	Odsal Stadium	B. Thaler	4,000
Halifax Panthers	8–16	Featherstone Rovers	30 May 2021, 15:00	The MBi Shay	T. Grant	882
London Broncos	30–10	Dewsbury Rams	30 May 2021, 15:00	Trailfinders Sports Ground	A. Moore	280
Oldham	18–40	Widnes Vikings	30 May 2021, 15:00	Bower Fold	J. Smith	600
Sheffield Eagles	25–25	Whitehaven	30 May 2021, 15:00	Keepmoat Stadium	C. Worsley	343

=== Round 9 ===
Betfred Championship: round nine
Home	Score	Away	Match Information
Home	Score	Away	Date and Time	Venue	Referee	Attendance (Note: Limited attendances only due to COVID-19 restrictions)
Oldham	28–32	Sheffield Eagles	12 June 2021, 15:00	Bower Fold	M. Mannifield	475
Halifax Panthers	30–6	York City Knights	13 June 2021, 11:30	The MBi Shay	G. Hewer	828
Dewsbury Rams	12–56	Toulouse Olympique	13 June 2021, 15:00	Tetley's Stadium	B. Thaler	418
Featherstone Rovers	44–0	Bradford Bulls	13 June 2021, 15:00	Millennium Stadium	A. Moore	1,700
Swinton Lions	30–36	Newcastle Thunder	13 June 2021, 15:00	Heywood Road	J. McMullen	455
Whitehaven	20–24	Batley Bulldogs	13 June 2021, 15:00	LEL Arena	N. Bennett	632
Widnes Vikings	22–54	London Broncos	13 June 2021, 15:00	Halton Stadium	L. Staveley	1,211

=== Round 10 ===
Betfred Championship: round ten
Home	Score	Away	Match Information
Home	Score	Away	Date and Time	Venue	Referee	Attendance
Dewsbury Rams	24–68	Featherstone Rovers	20 June 2021, 15:00	Tetley's Stadium	M. Mannifield	792
London Broncos	46–12	Whitehaven	20 June 2021, 15:00	Trailfinders Sports Ground	J. Smith	250
Newcastle Thunder	40–6	Oldham	20 June 2021, 15:00	Kingston Park	A. Moore	1,087
Swinton Lions	4–34	Halifax Panthers	20 June 2021, 15:00	Heywood Road	N. Bennett	520
Widnes Vikings	30–20	Sheffield Eagles	20 June 2021, 15:00	Halton Stadium	B. Thaler	984
York City Knights	20–22	Batley Bulldogs	20 June 2021, 15:00	LNER Community Stadium	T. Grant	1,486
Toulouse Olympique	P–P	Bradford Bulls	TBC (Note: Match postponed. Originally scheduled for 19 June but postponed on 6 June under RFL rules not requiring part-time clubs to travel to France if COVID-19 restrictions require a long period of quarantine.)	Stade Ernest-Wallon

=== Round 11 ===
Betfred Championship: round eleven
Home	Score	Away	Match Information
Home	Score	Away	Date and Time	Venue	Referee	Attendance
Featherstone Rovers	68–12	Oldham	26 June 2021, 15:00	Millennium Stadium	N. Bennett	1,750
Batley Bulldogs	12–22	Halifax Panthers	27 June 2021, 15:00	Fox's Biscuits Stadium	B. Thaler	1,193
Bradford Bulls	12–25	Widnes Vikings	27 June 2021, 15:00	Odsal Stadium	S. Mikalauskas	3,153
London Broncos	38–24	Swinton Lions	27 June 2021, 15:00	Trailfinders Sports Ground	M. Smaill	240
Oldham	4–18	Dewsbury Rams	27 June 2021, 15:00	Bower Fold	M. Rossleigh	600
Sheffield Eagles	6–54	Toulouse Olympique	27 June 2021, 15:00	Mobile Rocket Stadium, Wakefield	G. Hewer	292
Whitehaven	37–12	York City Knights	27 June 2021, 15:00	LEL Arena	M. Mannifield	601

=== Round 12 ===
Betfred Championship: round twelve
Home	Score	Away	Match Information
Home	Score	Away	Date and Time	Venue	Referee	Attendance
Featherstone Rovers	63–14	London Broncos	3 July 2021, 15:00	Millennium Stadium	S. Mikalauskas	1,750
Toulouse Olympique	C–C	Oldham	— (Note: Match was scheduled for 3 July but under COVID-19 quarantine rules in place in the UK and France the game was postponed. With no free dates in the season calendar the fixture was cancelled and was not played.)
Bradford Bulls	30–16	Batley Bulldogs	4 July 2021, 15:00	Odsal Stadium	A. Moore	2,831
Dewsbury Rams	18–18	Sheffield Eagles	4 July 2021, 15:00	Tetley's Stadium	M. Rossleigh	549
Halifax Panthers	17–16	Widnes Vikings	4 July 2021, 15:00	The MBi Shay	M. Mannifield	1,232
Whitehaven	36–22	Swinton Lions	4 July 2021, 15:00	LEL Arena	J. Mcmullen	746
York City Knights	26–28	Newcastle Thunder	4 July 2021, 15:00	LNER Community Stadium	N. Bennett	1,497

=== Round 13 ===
Betfred Championship: round thirteen
Home	Score	Away	Match Information
Home	Score	Away	Date and Time	Venue	Referee	Attendance
Halifax Panthers	14–4	Whitehaven	11 July 2021, 13:00	The MBi Shay	M. Rossleigh	877
Batley Bulldogs	12–32	Toulouse Olympique	11 July 2021, 15:00	Fox's Biscuits Stadium	S. Mikalauskas	782
London Broncos	50–20	York City Knights	11 July 2021, 15:00	Trailfinders Sports Ground	J. Mcmullen	200
Newcastle Thunder	24–12	Dewsbury Rams	11 July 2021, 15:00	Kingston Park	J. Smith	789
Oldham	22–54	Bradford Bulls	11 July 2021, 15:00	Bower Fold	B. Millican	650
Swinton Lions	22–30	Sheffield Eagles	11 July 2021, 15:00	Heywood Road	T. Crashley	501
Widnes Vikings	10–32	Featherstone Rovers	11 July 2021, 15:00	DCBL Stadium	A. Moore	947

=== Round 14 ===
Betfred Championship: round fourteen
Home	Score	Away	Match Information
Home	Score	Away	Date and Time	Venue	Referee	Attendance
Sheffield Eagles	28–40	Halifax Panthers	25 July 2021, 12:30	Mobile Rocket Stadium (Note: Sheffield's home ground unavailable due to pitch maintenance work)	B. Milligan	775
Batley Bulldogs	42–12	Newcastle Thunder	25 July 2021, 15:00	Fox's Biscuits Stadium	M. Griffiths	932
Bradford Bulls	30–36	Featherstone Rovers	25 July 2021, 15:00	Odsal Stadium	M. Mannifield	3,708
Whitehaven	28–24	Oldham	25 July 2021, 15:00	LEL Arena	A. Moore	920
York City Knights	46–10	Swinton Lions	25 July 2021, 15:00	LNER Community Stadium	S. Mikalauskas	1,344
London Broncos	C–C	Widnes Vikings	— (Note: After London Broncos reported more than seven players requiring to isolate, the match was postponed then cancelled as the clubs agreed there was no possible date available for re-arranging the fixture.)
Toulouse Olympique	C–C	Dewsbury Rams	— (Note: Match cancelled due to quarantine rules surrounding travel to France.)

=== Round 15 ===
Betfred Championship: round fifteen
Home	Score	Away	Match Information
Home	Score	Away	Date and Time	Venue	Referee	Attendance
Dewsbury Rams	18–22	Swinton Lions	1 August 2021, 15:00	Tetley's Stadium	M. Smaill	616
Featherstone Rovers	6–23	Toulouse Olympique	1 August 2021, 15:00	Millennium Stadium	J. Smith	4,021
Halifax Panthers	24–21	Bradford Bulls	1 August 2021, 15:00	The MBi Shay	A. Moore	2,696
Newcastle Thunder	14–20	Whitehaven	1 August 2021, 15:00	Kingston Park	B. Milligan	1,647
Oldham	20–30	London Broncos	1 August 2021, 15:00	Bower Fold	C. Smith	948
Widnes Vikings	16–34	Batley Bulldogs	1 August 2021, 15:00	DCBL Stadium	N. Bennett	1,258
Sheffield Eagles	P–P	York City Knights	Not rearranged (Note: Match postponed under COVID-19 protocols after Sheffield reported over seven players testing positive or required to self-isolate after close contact.)	Keepmoat Stadium

=== Round 16 ===
Betfred Championship: round sixteen
Home	Score	Away	Match Information
Home	Score	Away	Date and Time	Venue	Referee	Attendance
Batley Bulldogs	13–28	Featherstone Rovers	8 August 2021, 15:00	Fox's Biscuits Stadium	A. Moore	1,259
Bradford Bulls	P–P	Sheffield Eagles	Not rearranged (Note: Match postponed under RFL COVID-19 protocols after Sheffield reported more than seven players testing positive or isolating under close contact.)	Odsal Stadium
Halifax Panthers	14–12	Newcastle Thunder	8 August 2021, 15:00	The MBi Shay	J. Smith	1,541
London Broncos	6–66	Toulouse Olympique	8 August 2021, 15:00	Trailfinders Sports Ground	S. Mikalauskas	500
Swinton Lions	22–22	Oldham	8 August 2021, 15:00	Heywood Park	G. Hewer	1,527
Whitehaven	20–18	Dewsbury Rams	8 August 2021, 15:00	LEL Arena	J. Mcmullen	730
York City Knights	34–20	Widnes Vikings	8 August 2021, 15:00	LNER Community Stadium	N. Bennett	1,386

=== Round 17 ===
Betfred Championship: round seventeen
Home	Score	Away	Match Information
Home	Score	Away	Date and Time	Venue	Referee	Attendance
Newcastle Thunder	12–36	Bradford Bulls	14 August 2021, 17:00	Kingston Park	N. Bennett	1,168
Toulouse Olympique	C–C	Halifax Panthers	— (Note: Match postponed and not rescheduled as RFL operational rules do not require part-time clubs to travel to France while COVID-19 restrictions mandate long periods of quarantine on return. With no dates available in the season calendar for rescheduling the fixture is cancelled and will not be played.)
Featherstone Rovers	44–14	York City Knights	14 August 2021, 18:00	Millennium Stadium	M. Rossleigh	2,183
Dewsbury Rams	23–2	Widnes Vikings	15 August 2021, 15:00	Tetley's Stadium	T. Grant	726
Sheffield Eagles	25–18	Oldham	15 August 2021, 15:00	Keepmoat Stadium	A. Moore	379
Swinton Lions	6–38	Batley Bulldogs	15 August 2021, 15:00	Heywood Road	S. Mikalauskas	842
Whitehaven	32–18	London Broncos	15 August 2021, 15:00	LEL Arena	J. Smith	792

=== Round 18 ===
Betfred Championship: round eighteen
Home	Score	Away	Match Information
Home	Score	Away	Date and Time	Venue	Referee	Attendance
Batley Bulldogs	56–12	Sheffield Eagles	22 August 2021, 15:00	Fox's Biscuits Stadium	B. Milligan	859
Bradford Bulls	30–26	Swinton Lions	22 August 2021, 15:00	Odsal Stadium	M. Rossleigh	2,819
Featherstone Rovers	64–6	Dewsbury Rams	22 August 2021, 15:00	Millennium Stadium	S. Mikaluskas	2,115
Newcastle Thunder	P–P	London Broncos	Not rearranged (Note: Match postponed under RFL COVID-19 protocols at request of Newcastle.)	Kingston Park
Oldham	6–34	Toulouse Olympique	22 August 2021, 15:00	Bower Fold	J. Smith	743
Widnes Vikings	25–6	Halifax Panthers	22 August 2021, 15:00	Halton Stadium	T. Grant	1,252
York City Knights	30–12	Whitehaven	22 August 2021, 15:00	LNER Community Stadium	A. Moore	1,460

=== Round 19 ===
Betfred Championship: round nineteen
Home	Score	Away	Match Information
Home	Score	Away	Date and Time	Venue	Referee	Attendance
Dewsbury Rams	22–43	Newcastle Thunder	29 August 2021, 15:00	Tetley's Stadium	G. Hewer	540
Halifax Panthers	48–12	Swinton Lions	29 August 2021, 15:00	The MBi Shay	N. Bennett	1,663
London Broncos	42–12	Sheffield Eagles	29 August 2021, 15:00	Trailfinders Sports Ground	C. Worsley	350
Oldham	10–48	Featherstone Rovers	29 August 2021, 15:00	Bower Fold	M. Smaill	1,158
Whitehaven	64–6	Widnes Vikings	29 August 2021, 15:00	LEL Arena	B. Milligan	951
York City Knights	18–36	Bradford Bulls	29 August 2021, 15:00	LNER Community Stadium	J. Smith	4,000
Toulouse Olympique	C–C	Batley Bulldogs	— (Note: Match postponed and not rescheduled as RFL operational rules do not require part-time clubs to travel to France while COVID-19 restrictions mandate long periods of quarantine on return. With no dates available in the season calendar for rescheduling the fixture is cancelled and will not be played.)

=== Round 20 ===
Betfred Championship: round nineteen
Home	Score	Away	Match Information
Home	Score	Away	Date and Time	Venue	Referee	Attendance
Newcastle Thunder	16–29	York City Knights	3 September 2021, 19:45	Kingston Park	A. Moore	922
Batley Bulldogs	14–22	Whitehaven	5 September 2021, 15:00	Fox's Biscuits Stadium	M. Mannifield	922
Bradford Bulls	6–60	Toulouse Olympique	5 September 2021, 15:00	Tetley's Stadium, Dewsbury	G. Hewer	2,445
Featherstone Rovers	54–22	Halifax Panthers	5 September 2021, 15:00	Millennium Stadium	C. Worsley	3,063
Swinton Lions	32–34	London Broncos	5 September 2021, 15:00	Heywood Road	C. Smith	542
Widnes Vikings	62–4	Oldham	5 September 2021, 15:00	Halton Stadium	M. Rossleigh	1,088
Sheffield Eagles	20–24	Dewsbury Rams	5 September 2021, 16:30	Keepmoat Stadium, Doncaster	J. Vella	491

=== Round 21 ===
Betfred Championship: round twenty-one
Home	Score	Away	Match Information
Home	Score	Away	Date and Time	Venue	Referee	Attendance
Batley Bulldogs	24–31	Dewsbury Rams	12 September 2021, 15:00	Fox's Biscuits Stadium	B. Thaler	1,532
Oldham	24–38	Newcastle Thunder	12 September 2021, 15:00	Bower Fold	J. Smith	723
Widnes Vikings	10–9	Bradford Bulls	12 September 2021, 15:00	Halton Stadium	M. Griffiths	1,725
London Broncos	24–48	Featherstone Rovers	12 September 2021, 15:00	Trailfinders Sports Ground	N. Bennett	555
Whitehaven	19–6	Halifax Panthers	12 September 2021, 15:00	LEL Arena	A. Moore	1,258
Sheffield Eagles	28–34	Swinton Lions	12 September 2021, 16:30	Keepmoat Stadium	G. Hewer	430
Toulouse Olympique	C–C	York City Knights	—

=== Round 22 ===
Betfred Championship: round twenty-two
Home	Score	Away	Match Information
Home	Score	Away	Date and Time	Venue	Referee	Attendance
Newcastle Thunder	12–82	Toulouse Olympique	18 September 2021, 15:00	Kingston Park	C. Worlsey	428
Bradford Bulls	22–36	Whitehaven	19 September 2021, 15:00	Odsal Stadium	A. Moore	5,340
Dewsbury Rams	21–14	Oldham	19 September 2021, 15:00	Tetley's Stadium	M. Rossleigh	827
Featherstone Rovers	78–10	Sheffield Eagles	19 September 2021, 15:00	Millennium Stadium	B. Millican	1,750
Halifax Panthers	10–12	Batley Bulldogs	19 September 2021, 15:00	The MBi Shay	J. Smith	2,216
Swinton Lions	16–26	Widnes Vikings	19 September 2021, 15:00	Sheffield Olympic Legacy Stadium	G. Hewer	1,358
York City Knights	32–22	London Broncos	19 September 2021, 15:00	LNER Community Stadium	S. Mikalauskas	2,782

== Play-offs ==
Similar to the Super League, the teams who finished first and second respectively on the regular season table (Toulouse Olympique and Featherstone Rovers respectively, had byes to the semi-finals. The four teams who finish third to sixth contested in the two eliminator play-offs, with the winner of those two games moving on to the semi-finals (Halifax Panthers and Batley Bulldogs respectively).

=== Team bracket ===
Eliminators
4	Batley Bulldogs	23
5	Bradford Bulls	10
3	Halifax Panthers	24
6	Whitehaven	20

Semi-finals
1	Toulouse Olympique	51
4	Batley Bulldogs	12
2	Featherstone Rovers	42
3	Halifax Panthers	10

Million Pound Game
1	Toulouse Olympique	34
2	Featherstone Rovers	12

=== Week 1: Eliminators ===
First eliminator

25 September 2021
17:30 BST (UTC+01)

Halifax Panthers	24 – 20	Whitehaven
Tries: McGrath 6'; Garside 10', 38'; Woodburn-Hall 34'; Goals: Woodburn-Hall 11'; Harris 35', 39'; Robinson 63'	Report (RFL); Report (Sky Sports)	Tries: Cooper 22'; Bulman 44', 78'; King 53'; Goals: Jouffret 23', 79'

The MBi Shay, Halifax
Attendance: 1,289
Referee: Chris Kendall

Second eliminator

25 September 2021
15:15 BST (UTC+01)

Batley Bulldogs	23 – 10	Bradford Bulls
Tries: Kaye 16'; Gilmore 35'; Hall 72'; Goals: Gilmore 6', 17', 34', 36', 73'; Drop goals: Gilmore 77'	Report (RFL); Report (Sky Sports)	Tries: Brown 54'; Lilley 64'; Goals: Brough 65'

Fox's Biscuits Stadium, Batley
Attendance: 2,005
Referee: James Child

=== Week 2: Semi-finals ===
First semi-final

2 October 2021
15:15 CEST (UTC+02)

Toulouse Olympique	51 – 12	Batley Bulldogs
Tries: Casty 10'; Gigot 14'; Bretherton 21'; Vaivai 42' 78'; Kheirallah 44'; Sangare 51'; Jussaume 57'; Garbutt 66'; Goals: Kheirallah 11', 15', 45', 52', 58', 67', 79'; Drop goals: Gigot 77'	Report (RFL); Report (Sky Sports)	Tries: Manning 17'; Johnson 27'; Goals: Gilmore 18', 28'

Stade Ernest-Wallon, Toulouse
Attendance: 6,871
Referee: Liam Moore

Second semi-final

2 October 2021
17:30 BST (UTC+01)

Featherstone Rovers	42 – 10	Halifax Panthers
Tries: Halton 5'; Kopczak 20'; Ferres 51'; Hardcastle 54'; Jones 57', 70'; Welham 63'; Goals: Hall 6', 14', 21', 55', 58', 64', 71'	Report (RFL); Report (Sky Sports)	Tries: McGrath 10'; Harris 67'; Goals: Robinson 68'

Millennium Stadium, Featherstone
Attendance: 2,084
Referee: Robert Hicks

=== Week 3: Million Pound Game ===
Million Pound Game

10 October 2021
18:00 CEST (UTC+02)

Toulouse Olympique	34 – 12	Featherstone Rovers
Tries: Jussaume (2), Schaumkal, Hansen, Ford; Goals: Kheirallah (7)	Report (Sky Sports)	Tries: Ferres, Davies; Goals: Hall (2)

Stade Ernest Wallon, Toulouse
Attendance: 9,235
Referee: Robert Hicks
Player of the Match: Mathieu Jussaume (Toulouse)

Toulouse Olympique	Position	Featherstone Rovers
#1 Mark Khierallah	Fullback	#36 Alex Walker
#2 Jy Hitchcox	Wing	#1 Craig Hall
#4 Mathieu Jussaume	Centre	#4 Josh Hardcastle
#3 Junior Vaivai	Centre	#3 Kris Welham
#21 Latrell Schaumkel	Wing	#5 Gareth Gale
#6 Johnathon Ford	Stand-off	#7 Dane Chisholm
#31 Tony Gigot	Scrum-half	#9 Fa'amanu Brown
#10 Harrison Hansen	Prop	#8 Craig Kopczak
#9 Lloyd White	Hooker	#14 Connor Jones
#8 Remi Casty	Prop	#13 James Lockwood
#12 Dom Peyroux	Second-row	#11 Brett Ferres
#16 Joe Bretherton	Second-row	#20 Frankie Halton
#13 Anthony Marion	Loose forward	#19 Callum Field
#14 Éloi Pélissier	interchange	#15 John Davies
#17 Joseph Paulo	interchange	#16 Jack Bussey
#18 Mitch Garbutt	interchange	#21 Dean Parata
#23 Justin Sangare	interchange	#24 Dale Ferguson
