= 2021 RFL Championship =

2021 rugby league competition in the United Kingdom

- League: Championship
- Duration: 2 April 2021 – 9 October 2021
- Teams: 14
- Matches played: 45
- Points scored: 4,518
- Highest attendance: 9,235 (Toulouse Olympique vs Featherstone Rovers, 10 October 2021)
- Lowest attendance: 200 (London Broncos vs York City Knights, 11 July 2021)
- Broadcast partners: OurLeague; Sky Sports (play-offs only)

2021 season
- Champions: Toulouse Olympique (1st title)
- Championship Leaders' Shield: Toulouse Olympique (1st title)
- Runners-up: Featherstone Rovers
- Biggest home win: 70–0 (Toulouse Olympique vs Widnes Vikings, 9 May 2021)
- Biggest away win: 12–82 (Newcastle Thunder vs Toulouse Olympique, 18 September 2021)

Promotion and relegation
- Promoted from Championship: Toulouse Olympique
- Relegated to League 1: Oldham; Swinton Lions

The 2021 Rugby Football League Championship is a rugby league football competition played in England, and France. It is the second tier of the three tiers of professional rugby league in England, below Super League, and above League 1. The sponsors for the league are the bookmakers, Betfred and the league will continue to be known as the Betfred Championship.

== Teams ==
The league comprises 14 teams playing 22 matches each in the regular season. Each teams will play nine others twice (home and away) and play the other four teams just one (home or away).

Locations of the 2021 RFL Championship teams
Locations of 2021 RFL Championship teams in France
Locations of the 2021 RFL Championship teams in West Yorkshire

Team	Stadium	Capacity	Location
Batley Bulldogs (2021 season)	Mount Pleasant	7,500	Batley, West Yorkshire
Bradford Bulls (2021 season)	Crown Flatt; Odsal Stadium	5,800; 22,000	Dewsbury, West Yorkshire; Bradford, West Yorkshire
Dewsbury Rams (2021 season)	Crown Flatt	5,800	Dewsbury, West Yorkshire
Featherstone Rovers (2021 season)	Post Office Road	8,000	Featherstone, West Yorkshire
Halifax (2021 season)	The Shay	14,000	Halifax, West Yorkshire
London Broncos (2021 season)	Trailfinders Sports Ground	4,000	West Ealing
Newcastle Thunder (2021 season)	Kingston Park	10,200	Newcastle upon Tyne, Newcastle
Oldham (2021 season)	Bower Fold	6,500	Stalybridge, Greater Manchester
Sheffield Eagles (2021 season)	Keepmoat Stadium	15,231	Doncaster, South Yorkshire
Swinton Lions (2021 season)	Heywood Road	3,387	Sale, Greater Manchester
Toulouse Olympique (2021 season)	Stade Ernest-Wallon	19,500	Toulouse, France
Whitehaven (2021 season)	Recreation Ground	7,500	Whitehaven, Cumbria
Widnes Vikings (2021 season)	DCBL Stadium	13,350	Widnes, Cheshire
York City Knights (2021 season)	York Community Stadium	8,005	York, North Yorkshire

== Fixtures and results ==
The governing body, the Rugby Football League (RFL) decided that the Summer Bash will not be played due to restrictions imposed due to the COVID-19 pandemic in the United Kingdom which will limit or prohibit the attendance of spectators.

Following an RFL meeting with both the Championship and League 1 clubs, it was agreed that golden point extra time would be suspended for this season, following concerns over the welfare of players and staff.

The RFL also issued guidance on clubs travelling to France to play Toulouse. While UK COVID-19 quarantine rules require travellers to isolate for five days on return from France, the RFL stated that it was permissible for the part-time clubs in the Championship to postpone fixtures against Toulouse. The postponement did not apply to London Broncos as the club's players are full-time.

=== Cancelled and forfeited matches ===
In March 2021 the RFL announced that the part-time clubs in the Championship would not have to travel to France to play Toulouse while the quarantine rules requiring travellers to isolate for five days were in force. This ruling did not apply to the full-time club, London Broncos. London were due to travel to Toulouse for a match on 17 April but declined to do so. The RFL therefore awarded the two competition points to Toulouse with the score recorded as 24–0. The match does not count towards the number of games played by London towards qualification for the play-offs. The RFL also referred London to the off-field compliance board for failing to fulfil a fixture. At a subsequent meeting the compliance board deducted 2 points from London for beaching the operational rules by failing to fulfil the match.

Toulouse's game against Bradford, scheduled for 19 June 2021 was cancelled on 4 June due to the quarantine rules. There were no free dates in the calendar to accommodate rescheduling so the game was not played.

London's game against Widnes scheduled for 25 July was cancelled on 20 July, after London Broncos reported more than seven players requiring to isolate, the match was postponed then cancelled as the clubs agreed there was no possible date available for re-arranging the fixture.

=== Other points deductions ===
In August, Featherstone were deducted two competition points (the equivalent of a win) for breaching RFL Operational Rules. In breach of UK government restrictions during the COVID-19 pandemic the club hosted an indoor gathering on 27 March at which 12 members of the first team were present. Under RFL COVID-19 protocols all the players involved should have been stood-down and ordered to self-isolate. The club did not comply with the protocols and also failed to assist with the RFL investigation into the incident.

== Regular season table ==
As a precaution against disruption to fixtures due to COVID-19, league placings will be decided by points percentage, rather than points. After the regular season of 22 rounds, the top six teams will go forward to the play-offs, with the winners being promoted to Super League for 2022. The two teams finishing bottom of the Championship after the regular season will be relegated to League 1.

Pos	Team	Pld	W	D	L	PF	PA	PP	Pts	PCT	Qualification (Note: Teams must have played at least 70% of scheduled fixtures (16 matches) to qualify for the play-offs. Fixtures involving Toulouse that are cancelled due to quarantine restrictions do not count against either team involved in respect of the 70% requirement.)
1	Toulouse Olympique (Note: Toulouse were awarded the fixture against London scheduled for 17 April after London declined to travel to France. Toulouse are awarded the two competition points and for points scored percentage the score is recorded as a 24–0 win for Toulouse. The game does not count towards the number of games played by London to determine eligibility for the play-offs)	14	14	0	0	698	124	562.9	28	100.00	Championship Leaders' Shield & advance to semi-final
2	Featherstone Rovers	21	20	0	1	943	292	322.9	38 (Note: Featherstone deducted 2 points for breach of the RFL Operational Rules in March 2021.)	90.48	Advance to semi-final
3	Halifax Panthers	21	13	0	8	528	354	149.2	26	61.90	Advance to eliminators
4	Batley Bulldogs	21	13	0	8	561	411	136.5	26	61.90	Advance to eliminators
5	Bradford Bulls	20	12	0	8	514	501	102.6	24	60.00	Advance to eliminators
6	Whitehaven	22	12	1	9	502	524	95.8	25	56.82	Advance to eliminators
7	London Broncos	20	11	1	8	552	579	95.3	21 (Note: London deducted 2 points for breach of the RFL Operational Rules in failing for fulfil the fixture against Toulouse in April 2021.)	52.50	
8	Widnes Vikings	21	9	1	11	494	534	92.5	19	45.24	
9	York City Knights	20	9	0	11	502	477	105.2	18	45.00	
10	Dewsbury Rams	21	8	1	12	360	608	59.2	17	40.48	
11	Newcastle Thunder	20	7	1	12	431	627	68.7	15	37.50	
12	Sheffield Eagles	20	5	3	12	420	665	63.2	13	32.50	
13	Oldham	21	2	1	18	308	748	41.2	5	11.90	Relegated to League 1
14	Swinton Lions	22	2	1	19	404	773	52.3	5	11.36	Relegated to League 1

Rules for classification: 1) win percentage; 2) points scored percentage (points scored divided by points conceded).

== Play-offs ==
The play-off structure and dates were confirmed on 20 August and will take place over three weekends commencing 25 September. The first weekend will see 3rd play 6th and 4th play 5th in a double header. The following weekend will be another double header with 1st playing the lowest ranked play-off winning team and 2nd playing the highest ranked play-off winner. The winners of these two matches will meet in the Million Pound Game on Sunday 10 October.

=== Team bracket ===
Eliminators
4	Batley Bulldogs	23
5	Bradford Bulls	10
3	Halifax Panthers	24
6	Whitehaven	20

Semi-finals
1	Toulouse Olympique	51
4	Batley Bulldogs	12
2	Featherstone Rovers	42
3	Halifax Panthers	10

Million Pound Game
1	Toulouse Olympique	34
2	Featherstone Rovers	12

=== Summary ===
Home	Score	Away	Match Information
Home	Score	Away	Date and Time (Local)	Venue	Referee	Attendance
Eliminators
Halifax Panthers	24–20	Whitehaven	25 September 2021, 15:15	The MBi Shay	Chris Kendall	1,289
Batley Bulldogs	23–10	Bradford Bulls	25 September 2021, 17:30	Fox's Biscuits Stadium	James Child	2,005
Semi-finals
Toulouse Olympique	51–12	Batley Bulldogs	2 October 2021, 15:15	Stade Ernest-Wallon	Liam Moore	6,871
Featherstone Rovers	42–10	Halifax Panthers	2 October 2021, 17:30	Millennium Stadium	Robert Hicks	2,084
Million Pound Game
Toulouse Olympique	34–12	Featherstone Rovers	10 October 2021, 18:00	Stade Ernest-Wallon	Robert Hicks	9,235

== Awards ==
The end of year awards for the 2021 Championship season were announced on 29 September 2021.

Award	Winner
Betfred Championship Club of the Year	York City Knights
Betfred Championship Player of the Year	(England) Craig Hall (Featherstone Rovers)
Betfred Championship Young Player of the Year	(England) Tyler Dupree (Oldham)
Betfred Championship Coach of the Year	(England) Craig Lingard (Batley Bulldogs)
Our League Entertainer of the Year	(Scotland) Lachlan Walmsley (Whitehaven)
