= Tarcisio Navarrete =

Mexican politician and diplomat (1954–2025)

- Born: 29 July 1954; Mexico City, Mexico
- Died: 5 November 2025 (aged 71)
- Occupation: Politician
- Political party: PAN

Ricardo Tarcisio Navarrete Montes de Oca (Note: In this Spanish name, the first or paternal surname is Navarrete and the second or maternal family name is Montes de Oca.) (29 July 1954 – 5 November 2025) was a Mexican politician and diplomat from the National Action Party (PAN).

== Life and career ==
In the 2000 general election, he was elected to a plurinominal seat (4th region) in the Chamber of Deputies for the duration of the 58th Congress; during his congressional term of office, his alternate was Kenia López Rabadán.

Navarrete was the Ambassador of Mexico to Greece, Moldova and Cyprus from 2011 onwards. He had served as Ambassador to Honduras from 2007 to 2011.

Navarrete died on 5 November 2025, at the age of 71.
