= Anthony Marion =

France international rugby league footballer (born 1994)

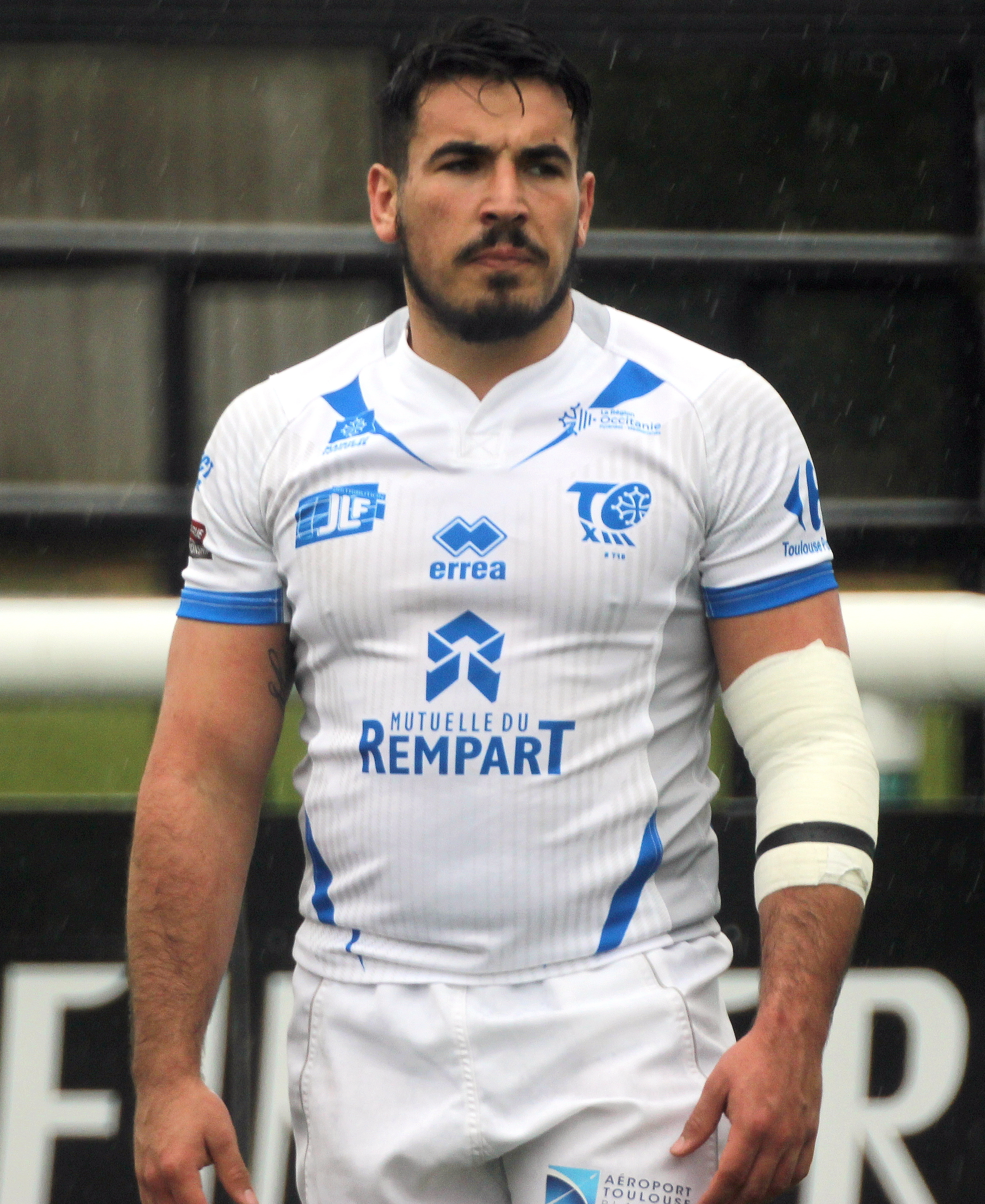

Personal information
- Born: 12 January 1994 (age 32) Albi, Tarn, Occitania, France
- Height: 5 ft 9 in (1.75 m)
- Weight: 14 st 2 lb (90 kg)

Playing information
- Position: Hooker, Loose forward, Stand-off, Scrum-half
Club
Years	Team	Pld	T	G	FG	P
2014–	Toulouse Olympique	156	40	44	0	248
2015(DR)	→Toulouse Olympique Broncos	10	2	1	3	15
	Total	166	42	45	3	263
Representative
Years	Team	Pld	T	G	FG	P
2018–	France	6	1	0	0	4
- Source: As of 13 October 2026

Anthony Marion (born 12 January 1994) is a French professional rugby league footballer who plays as a loose forward for Toulouse Olympique in the Super League and France at international level.

He can also play hooker or in the halves. Marion was the back-up goal-kicker to Mark Kheirallah for Toulouse in the Championship.

== Background ==
Marion came through the youth system at RC Albi.

== Club career ==
=== Toulouse Olympique ===
Marion joined the Toulouse "Centre du Formation" in the summer of 2014 from Albi. He made his debut for Toulouse in Elite 2 in 2014/15 and then seized his opportunity later in the season to progress to the first team, due to injuries to more senior players. Marion signed his first contract with TO alongside Maxime Puech in July 2015.

At the end of the 2014/15 season, Toulouse had decided to move the first team to play in the English competition. With the next English season not due to commence until March 2016, Marion played the first half of the 2015/16 season in Elite 1 for Toulouse Olympique Broncos, the Toulouse reserve side who had taken their place in the French competition. In January 2016, Marion joined up with the first team for the 2016 campaign.

2016 was Toulouse's first season back in the English competition. They finished the season top of Kingstone Press League 1 but lost the promotion final to Rochdale Hornets before managing to secure promotion to the Championship for 2017. Marion played in 26 matches in total, scoring five tries in a season that saw him cement his place in the first team and secure a contract for 2017.

Marion, alongside Clément Boyer, made the most appearances for TO in 2017, playing in 32 out of 34 matches and scoring 5 tries. On 7 October 2017, it was confirmed that he had been retained for the 2018 season.

In 2018, Marion played 28 times, scoring 8 tries, and earned his first call up to the full France national rugby league team. His durability and utility value (able to play in the halves, at hooker and loose-forward) was rewarded when TO announced on 10 January 2019, that he had been retained for the 2019 season.

The 2019 season saw Toulouse finish second in the table and lose out to fifth-placed Featherstone Rovers in the preliminary final. Marion played in all 27 regular-season games and the three play-off matches, a feat matched only by skipper Con Mika. He scored a personal record 13 tries and also kicked 15 goals as back-up to Mark Kheirallah. In the final game of the 2019 season against Featherstone, Marion suffered a serious ankle injury. Despite the injury, Toulouse announced on 29 November 2019 that Marion had been retained for the 2020 season. Due to his injury, he did not play at all in the short 2020 RFL Championship that was subsequently cancelled due to COVID-19.

On 7 September 2020, Toulouse announced that Marion had signed a new contract that would keep him at the club until 2022. In 2021, he played in 13 of Toulouse's 15 games, scoring 6 tries and kicking 27 goals. He wore the squad number 13 and played most of his matches at loose-forward.

On 4 November 2021 it was announced that Marion would remain with the club until the end of the 2022 season. On 15 October 2023, Marion played in Toulouse Olympique's Million Pound Game loss against the London Broncos.

== Club statistics ==
Year	Club	Competition	Appearances	Tries	Goals	Drop goals	Points
2014–15	Toulouse Olympique	Elite One Championship	13	1	0	0	4
2015–16	Toulouse Olympique Broncos	Elite One Championship	10	2	3	1	15
2016	Toulouse Olympique	Kingstone Press League 1	22	6	0	0	24
2016	Toulouse Olympique	Challenge Cup	1	0	0	0	0
2017	Toulouse Olympique	Championship	30	5	0	0	20
2017	Toulouse Olympique	Challenge Cup	1	0	0	0	0
2018	Toulouse Olympique	Championship	21	7	0	0	28
2018	Toulouse Olympique	Qualifiers	7	1	0	0	4
2019	Toulouse Olympique	Championship	30	13	15	0	82
2020	Toulouse Olympique	Championship	0	0	0	0	0
2021	Toulouse Olympique	Championship	13	6	27	0	78
2022	Toulouse Olympique	Super League	0	0	0	0	0
Club career total			148	41	45	1	255
Source Updated 20 November 2021

== International career ==
=== France ===
Marion made his debut for France in 2018, coming off the bench in the 44-6 defeat to England at Leigh. He retained his place in the France squad for the 2018 Rugby League European Championship that autumn but didn't play in either victory against Wales or Ireland which saw France qualify for the 2021 Rugby League World Cup. Marion earned his second cap, scoring a try in the 28-10 victory over Scotland in Carcassonne in France's final match of the Championship.

Marion missed France's tour to Australia at the end of the 2019 season due to a serious ankle injury sustained in the Championship Preliminary Final 12-36 defeat to Featherstone Rovers in the final game of the season. Marion made his third appearance for France in the 10-30 defeat to England in Perpignan in 2021.

== International statistics ==
Year	Team	Competition	Appearances	Tries	Goals	Drop goals	Points
2018	France	Test Match	1	0	0	0	0
2018	France	2018 Rugby League European Championship	1	1	0	0	4
2021	France	Test Match	1	0	0	0	0
International career total			3	1	0	0	4
