= Miguel Montes =

Miguel Montes may refer to:

- Miguel Montes (footballer, born 1940), Spanish football forward and manager
- Miguel Montes (handballer) (born 1972), Cuban handballer
- Miguel Montes (footballer, born 1980), Salvadoran football goalkeeper
- Miguel Montes de Oca (born 1982), Argentine football forward
- Miguel Montes García (1937–2020), Mexican jurist and politician, president of the Chamber of Deputies (Mexico) in 1988
