= Navarrete =

Navarrete is a surname of Spanish, Italian, and French origin. It is related to Navarro.

== People ==
- Ada Navarrete (1890–1967), Mexican opera singer
- Alfonso Navarrete Prida (born 1963), Mexican politician
- Alfredo Navarrete (born 1955), Mexican footballer
- Antonio de Benavides y Fernández de Navarrete (1807–1884), Spanish politician and historian
- Antonio de Raya Navarrete (1536–1606), Spanish Catholic bishop
- Armando Navarrete García (born 1980), Mexican footballer
- Bobby Navarrete, American musician, founding member (1973) of Tierra (band)
- Carlos Navarrete Cáceres (born 1931), Guatemalan anthropologist and writer
- Carlos Navarrete Ruiz (born 1955), Mexican politician
- Daniel Navarrete (model) (born 1977), Mister Venezuela 2001
- Daniel Navarrete (wrestler) (born 1963), Argentine wrestler
- Diego Bernardo de Peredo y Navarrete (1696–1774), Mexican Catholic bishop
- Diego de León, 1st Count of Belascoáin, birth name Diego de León y Navarrete (1807–1841), Spanish military figure
- Domingo Fernández Navarrete (c. 1610–1689), Spanish missionary and archbishop
- Emanuel Navarrete (born 1995), Mexican boxer
- Ester Navarrete (born 1990), Spanish runner
- Francisco Plancarte y Navarrete (1856–1920), Mexican Catholic archbishop
- Gerardo Navarrete (born 1994), Chilean footballer
- Hernando Navarrete (1916–??), Colombian long-distance runner
- Inde Navarrette (born 2001), American actress
- Ignacio María de Álava y Sáenz de Navarrete (1750–1817), Spanish naval officer
- Jacinto Navarrete (born 1962), Colombian middle-distance runner
- Javier Gómez-Navarro Navarrete (1945–2024), Spanish politician
- Javier Navarrete (born 1956), Spanish composer of film scores
- Joaquina Navarrete Contreras (born 1966), Mexican politician
- Jolette (singer), full name Jolette Guadalupe Hernández Navarrete (born 1984), Mexican singer and television presenter
- Jorge Campos Navarrete (born 1966), Mexican footballer
- József Navarrete (born 1965), Hungarian fencer
- Juan Fernández Navarrete (1526–1579) Spanish painter
- Juan Hernández (Mexican boxer), full name Juan Hernandez Navarrete (born 1987), Mexican world champion boxer
- Juan Manuel Navarrete (born 1988), Argentine football
- Juan Pizarro Navarrete (1945–2022), Spanish physician and politician
- Julia Navarrete Guerrero (1881–1974), Mexican Catholic nun
- Luis Navarrete (born 1948), Cuban gymnast
- María Benítez Navarrete (born 1958), Mexican politician
- María Concepción Navarrete (born 1959), Mexican politician
- María Ofelia Navarrete, Salvadoran politician
- Martín Fernández de Navarrete (1765–1844), Spanish sailor and historian
- Melchor de Navarrete (1693–1761), Spanish soldier and administrator
- Miguel Elizondo Navarrete (born 1968), Mexican sprinter
- Pedro Navarrete (born 1981), Mexican zonal champion boxer
- Pete Navarrete, American musician, Ünloco
- Rafael Andrade Navarrete (1856–1928), Spanish politician and lawyer
- Randy Espinosa, full name Randy Navarrete Espinosa (born 1988), Guamanian footballer
- Rex Navarrete (born 1969), Filipino-American comedian
- Rolando Navarrete (born 1957), Filipino boxer
- Romain Navarrete (born 1994), French rugby player
- Segundo Navarrete (born 1985), Ecuadorian racing cyclist
- Sergio Navarrete (1925–??), Chilean alpine skier
- Tania Morgan Navarrete (born 1985), Mexican politician
- Tarcisio Navarrete (1954–2025), Mexican politician and diplomat
- Tony Navarrete, American politician (first elected 2017)
- Urbano Navarrete Cortés (1920–2010), Spanish Catholic cardinal
- Ximena Navarrete (born 1988), Mexican Miss Universe 2010

== See also ==
- Navarrete, Álava, a hamlet in Bernedo, Basque Country, Spain
- Navarrete, La Rioja, a municipality in Spain
- Battle of Nájera (Battle of Navarrete), 1367 conflict in Castilian Civil War
- Navarrete (Municipio de villa Bisonó), a municipality in the Dominican Republic
