= Romain Navarrete =

France international rugby league footballer

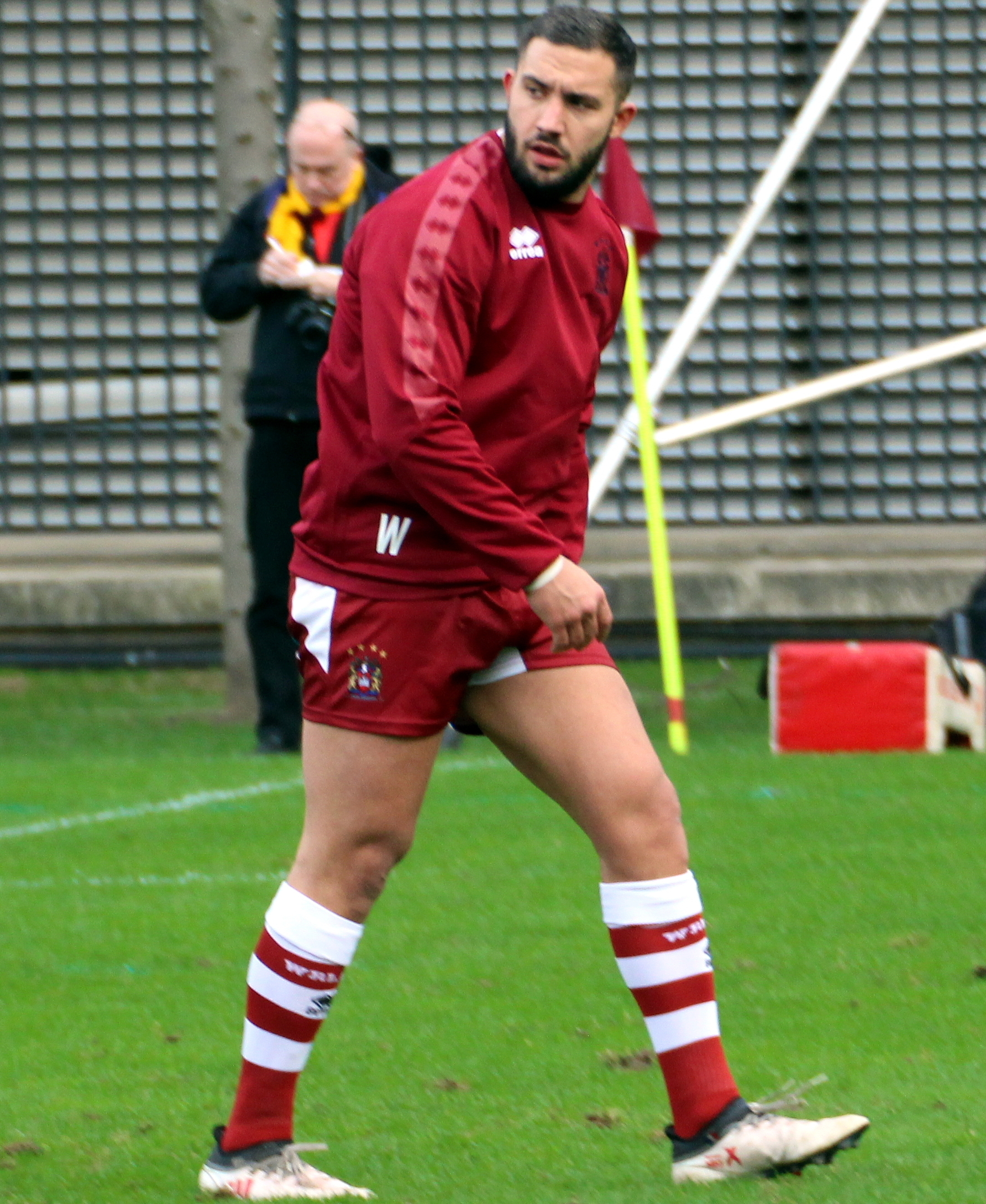

Personal information
- Born: 30 June 1994 (age 32) Occitania, France
- Height: 6 ft 0 in (1.84 m)
- Weight: 16 st 3 lb (103 kg)

Playing information
- Position: Prop
Club
Years	Team	Pld	T	G	FG	P
2012–13	SM Pia XIII	3	0	0	0	0
2013–14	Limoux Grizzlies	6	2	0	0	8
2014	Hemel Stags	6	1	0	0	4
2015–16	Catalans Dragons	11	0	0	0	0
2017–20	Wigan Warriors	60	0	0	0	0
2017(loan)	→ Swinton Lions	2	0	0	0	0
2017(loan)	→ Catalans Dragons	4	0	0	0	0
2018(loan)	→ Swinton Lions	1	0	0	0	0
2020(loan)	→ Wakefield Trinity	11	0	0	0	0
2021	London Broncos	11	2	0	0	8
2021–22	Toulouse Olympique	27	4	0	0	16
2023–	Catalans Dragons	99	3	0	0	12
	Total	241	12	0	0	48
Representative
Years	Team	Pld	T	G	FG	P
2016–	France	11	1	0	0	4
- Source: As of 1 November 2026

Romain Navarrete (born 30 June 1994) is a French rugby league footballer who plays as a prop for the Catalans Dragons in the Super League and France at international level.

He previously played for SM Pia XIII and the Limoux Grizzlies in the Elite One Championship, and the Hemel Stags in Championship 1. Navaratte played for the Catalans Dragons in the Super League. He has also played for the Wigan Warriors in the top flight and has spent time on loan from Wigan at the Swinton Lions in the Championship, and Catalans and Wakefield Trinity in the Super League. Navarette has also played for the London Broncos in the Championship

== Club career ==
=== Early career ===
Navarrete began his career at SM Pia XIII, moving to Limoux when Pia left the Elite One Championship. In 2014 he joined Hemel Stags in League 1, making 6 appearances for the club.

=== Catalans Dragons ===
Navarrete joined Catalans Dragons in late 2014 and spent two seasons playing in the reserves team. He was called up to the first team squad in 2016 and made his Super League début on May 14, 2016, in the victory over Huddersfield Giants.

=== Wigan Warriors ===
On 5 October 2016, Wigan Warriors announced that they had signed Navarrette on a two-year contract, for the 2017 and 2018 seasons.

In July 2017, Navarrette was loaned back to Catalans until the end of the season.

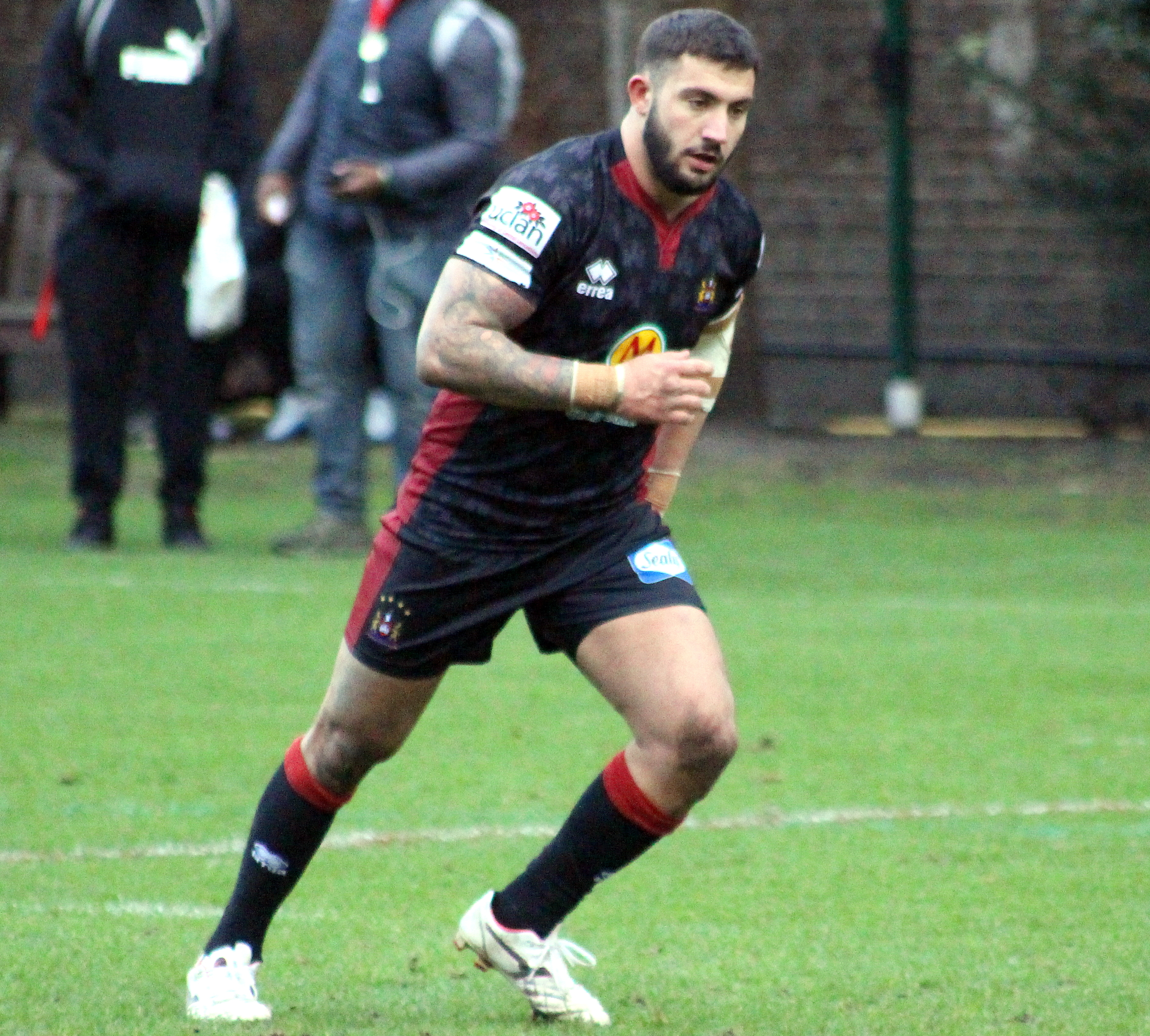
Navarrete playing for the Wigan Warriors in 2018

He played in the 2018 Super League Grand Final victory over the Warrington Wolves at Old Trafford.

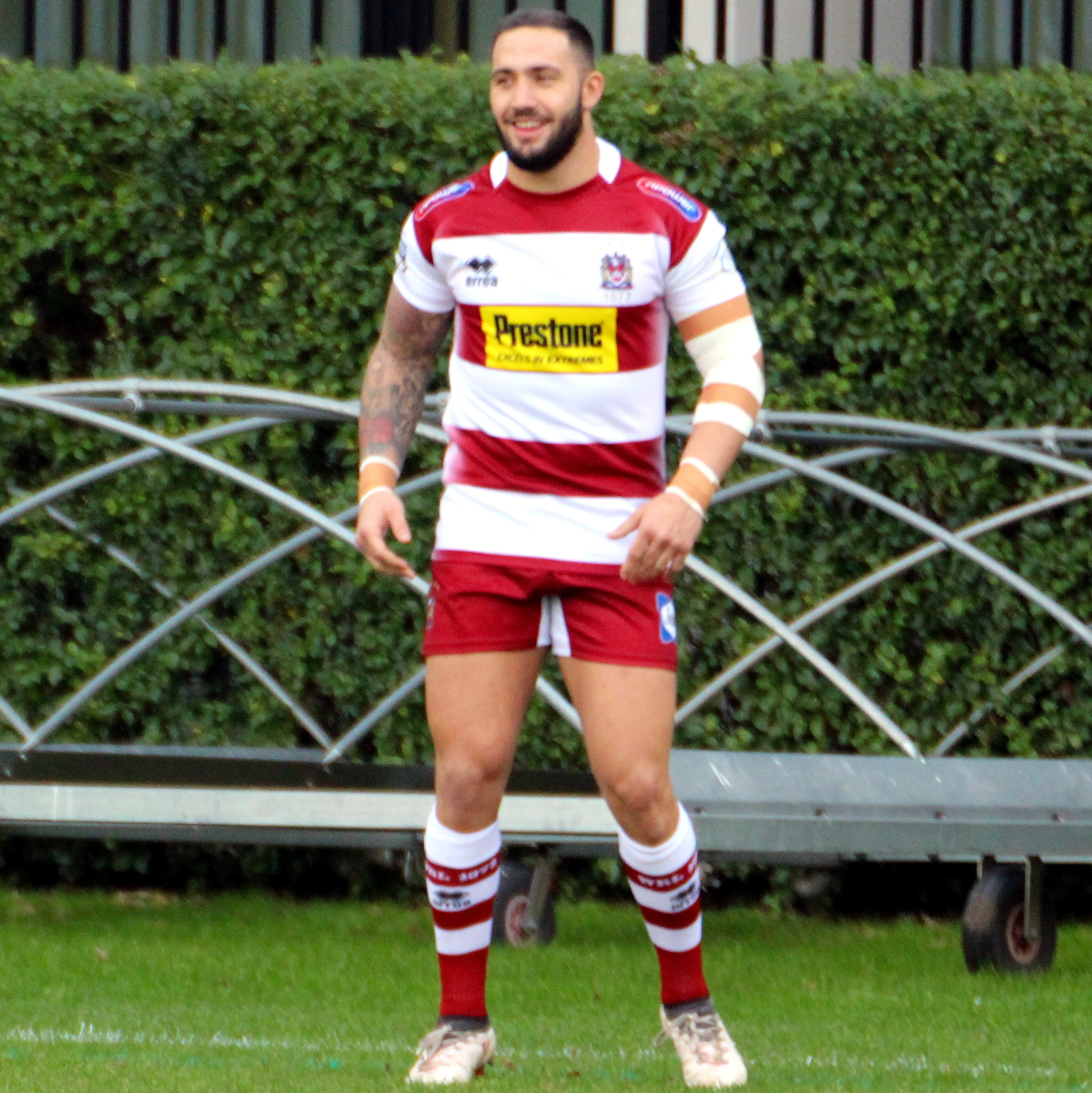
Navarrete playing for the Wigan Warriors in 2019

==== Swinton loan ====
Navarette played on loan with the Swinton Lions in 2017 and 2018.

==== Catalans loan ====
Navarette spent the latter part of the 2017 season with the Catalans Dragons on loan from Wigan.

==== Wakefield loan ====
Navarette spent the 2020 season with Wakefield Trinity on loan from Wigan.

=== London Broncos ===
On 9 January 2021 it was reported that he had signed for the London Broncos.

=== Toulouse Olympique ===
On 14 July 2021, it was reported that he had signed for Toulouse Olympique in the RFL Championship.

=== Catalans Dragons ===
In November 2022, Navarrete signed a two-year deal with Catalans starting in 2023. On 14 October 2023, Navarrete played in Catalans 2023 Super League Grand Final loss against Wigan.

== International career ==
On 22 October 2016, Navarrete made his international début for France in their end of year test match against England in Avignon.

On 1 October 2026 he was named in the 2026 France World Cup squad

== Club statistics ==
Year	Club	Competition	Appearances	Tries	Goals	Drop goals	Points
2012-13	SM Pia XIII	Elite One Championship	3	0	0	0	0
2013-14	Limoux Grizzlies	Elite One Championship	6	2	0	0	8
2014	Hemel Stags	Championship 1	6	1	0	0	4
2014-15	Saint-Estève XIII Catalan	Elite One Championship	16	4	0	0	16
2015-16	Saint-Estève XIII Catalan	Elite One Championship	22	4	0	0	16
2016	Catalan Dragons	Super League	11	0	0	0	0
2017	Wigan Warriors	Super League	10	0	0	0	0
2017	Swinton Lions	Championship	2	0	0	0	0
2017	Catalans Dragons	Super League	4	0	0	0	0
2018	Wigan Warriors	Super League	26	0	0	0	0
2018	Swinton Lions	Championship	1	0	0	0	0
2019	Wigan Warriors	Super League	24	0	0	0	0
2020	Wigan Warriors	Super League	0	0	0	0	0
2020	Wakefield Trinity	Super League	11	0	0	0	0
2021	London Broncos	Championship	11	2	0	0	8
2021	Toulouse Olympique	Championship	4	2	0	0	8
2022	Toulouse Olympique	Championship	23	2	0	0	8
2023	Catalans Dragons	Super League	26	1	0	0	4
2024	Catalans Dragons	Super League	29	0	0	0	0
2025	Catalans Dragons	Super League	23	1	0	0	4
2026	Catalans Dragons	Super League	23	1	0	0	4
2027	Catalans Dragons	Super League					
Club career total			241	12	0	0	48
