= Montes de Oca =

Montes de Oca (Spanish for "mountains of goose" or "hills of goose") may refer to:

== People ==
- Montes de Oca (surname), includes a list of notable people with this surname

== Places ==
- La Unión de Isidoro Montes de Oca, a municipality in Guerrero state, Mexico
- Montes de Oca (canton), in Costa Rica
- Montes de Oca (comarca), in Burgos province, Spain
- Montes de Oca, Argentina, a town in Santa Fe Province in Argentina
- Villafranca Montes de Oca, a municipality in Burgos province, Spain

== Other uses ==
- ARM Cadete Fernando Montes de Oca, a former minesweeper of the Mexican Navy
- Fernando Montes de Oca Fencing Hall, an indoor sports venue in Mexico City, Mexico

== See also ==
- Oca (river), a river in the north of Spain, whose source is in Montes de Oca
