= Montes de Oca (surname) =

Montes de Oca is a Spanish surname meaning "mountains of goose" or "hills of goose". Notable people with the surname include:

== Religion ==
- Ignacio Montes de Oca y Obregón (1840–1921), Mexican archbishop
- Salvador Montes de Oca (1895–1944), Venezuelan bishop

== Sports ==
=== Baseball ===
- Bryce Montes de Oca (born 1996), American baseball player
- Christian Montes De Oca (born 1999), Dominican baseball player
- Eliecer Montes de Oca (born 1971), Cuban baseball player
- José Montes de Oca (fl. 1908–1909), Cuban baseball player

=== Football (soccer) ===
- Ángel Montes de Oca (born 2003), Dominican Republic footballer
- Estíbaliz Montes de Oca (born 1999), Swedish-born footballer for Chile
- Miguel Montes de Oca (born 1982), Argentine footballer

=== Other sports ===
- Daniel Montes de Oca (born 1962), Uruguayan tennis player
- Deysy Montes de Oca (born 1990), Dominican taekwondo practitioner
- Javiel Montes De Oca (born 1997), Cuban volleyball player
- Ricardo Montes de Oca (born 2006), Venezuelan pole vaulter

== Other ==
- Fernando Montes de Oca (1829–1847), Mexican military cadet, one of the Niños Héroes
- Francisco Montes de Oca y Saucedo (1837–1885), Mexican politician and military surgeon
- Isidoro Montes de Oca (1789–1847), Mexican-Filipino revolutionary soldier
- Juan Montes de Oca (1601), Mexican-Filipino Prior of Gudalupe Church in Makati
- Jessica Garza Montes de Oca (born 1984), Mexican actress, singer-songwriter and writer
- Julia Pérez Montes de Oca (1839–1875), Cuban poet
- Marco Antonio Montes de Oca (1932–2009), Mexican poet and painter
- Xóchitl Montes de Oca (born 1971), Mexican politician

== See also ==
- Montes de Oca (disambiguation)
