= Latrell Schaumkel =

Niue international rugby league player

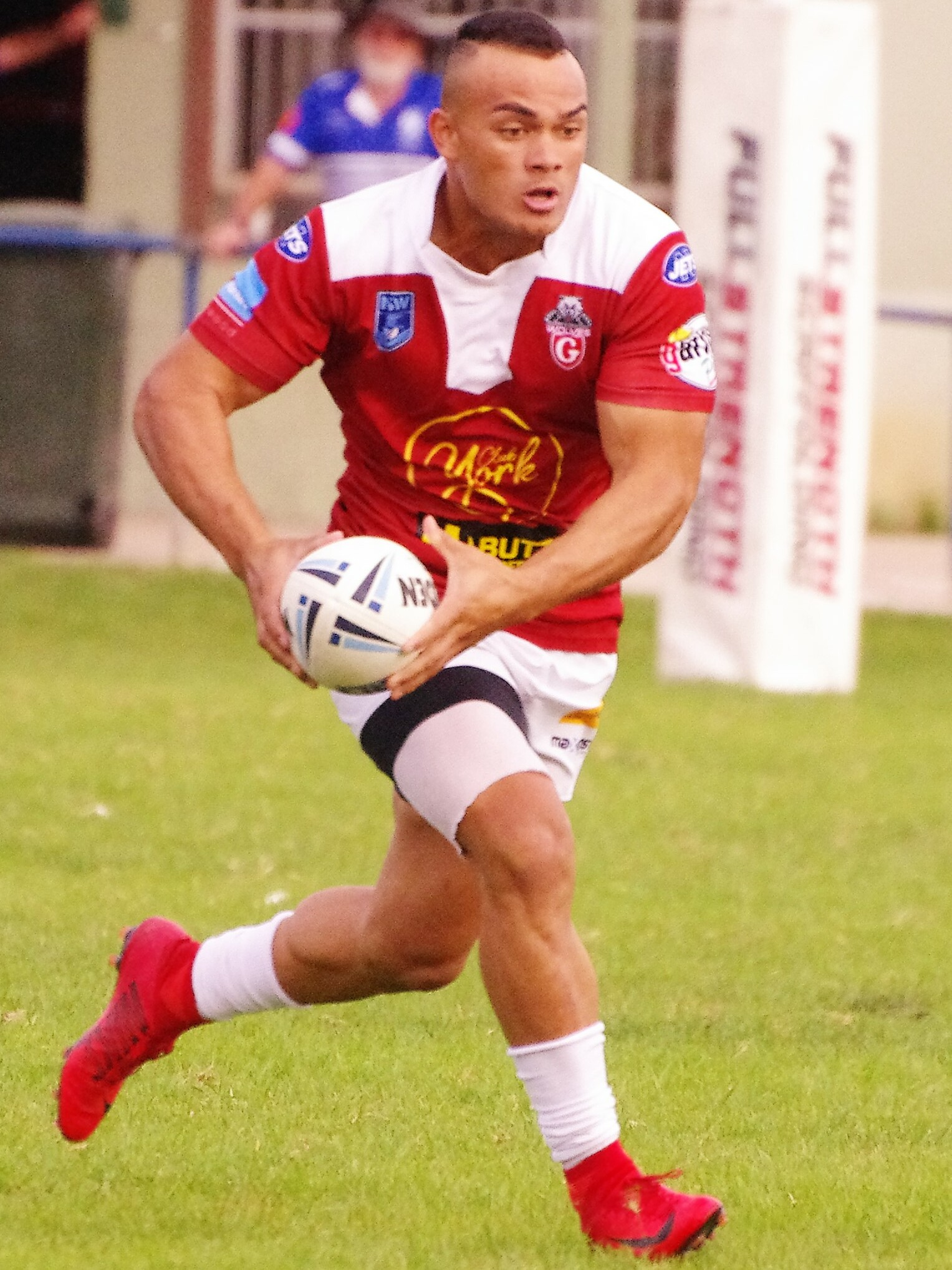

Personal information
- Born: 22 July 1994 (age 32) New Zealand
- Height: 5 ft 10 in (1.78 m)
- Weight: 13 st 12 lb (88 kg)

Playing information
- Position: Wing, Fullback
Club
Years	Team	Pld	T	G	FG	P
2019–20	Villeneuve	11	14	0	0	56
2021–23	Toulouse Olympique	23	11	0	0	44
	Total	34	25	0	0	100
Representative
Years	Team	Pld	T	G	FG	P
2018	Niue	4	2	0	0	8
- Source: As of 18 April 2023

Latrell Schaumkel (born 22 July 1994) is a former professional rugby league footballer who last played as a winger for Toulouse Olympique in the Super League. He previously played for Villeneuve in Elite 1. He played lower grades in Australia before moving to France and is an international with Niue.

== Background ==
Schaumkel played junior rugby league with Richmond Rovers before progressing through the ranks at Manly, North Sydney Bears and Newtown Jets before furthering his career in France.

== Club career ==
=== Manly-Warringah Sea Eagles ===
In 2010 Schaumkel was a member of the Manly Warringah Sea Eagles Harold Matthews Cup side. He graduated in 2011 to the S. G. Ball Cup. In 2012, he progressed to the Holden Cup making five appearances and scoring one try. In 2013, he scored a further 6 tries in 18 more appearances and also played 3 times in the NSW Cup.

=== North Sydney Bears ===
Schaumkel played for North Sydney in the NSW Cup between 2015 and 2017.

=== Newtown ===
Between 2019 and 2020, Schaumkel played for Newtown in the NSW Cup.

=== Villeneuve ===
Schaumkel made 11 appearances for the Leopards in the 2020/21 Elite 1 season, scoring 14 tries.

=== Toulouse Olympique ===
On 5 August 2020, Toulouse announced that Schaumkel had signed for the 2021 Betfred Championship season. Schaumkel played in 11 of Toulouse's 15 games, scoring 11 tries, including one in the Million Pound Game victory over Featherstone Rovers that saw TO promoted to Super League for 2022. Schaumkel played ten games for Toulouse Olympique in the 2022 Super League season as the club finished bottom of the table and were relegated back to the RFL Championship.

== International career ==
Schaumkel made a try-scoring debut for Niue in the 26-16 2018 Emerging Nations World Championship win on 4 October 2018 against Malta. His second cap came three days later, when he scored in the 24-12 win against the Philippines. His third appearance was in the semi-final win over Greece and he was again selected for the final on 13 October which Niue lost 24-16 to Malta.
