= Miguel Montes de Oca =

Argentine footballer

Personal information
- Full name: Miguel Ángel Montes de Oca
- Date of birth: 4 April 1982 (age 44)
- Place of birth: Buenos Aires, Argentina
- Position: Forward

Team information
- Current team: Hispano Americano (manager)

Senior career*
Years	Team	Apps	(Gls)
2003–2008	Deportivo Español	116	(13)
2009	San Marcos	12	(1)
2010	General Lamadrid	5	(0)
2011	Deportivo Español	17	(1)

Managerial career
- Boxing Club
- 2020–2021: Deportivo Cristal
- 2023–: Hispano Americano
- * Club domestic league appearances and goals

Miguel Angel Montes de Oca (born April 4, 1982, in Buenos Aires, Argentina) is an Argentine former footballer who played as a forward.

== Teams ==
=== Player ===
- (Argentina) Deportivo Español 2003–2008
- (Chile) San Marcos de Arica 2009
- (Argentina) General Lamadrid 2010
- (Argentina) Deportivo Español 2011

=== Manager ===
- (Argentina) Boxing Club
- (Argentina) Deportivo Cristal 2020–2021
- (Argentina) Hispano Americano 2023–Present
