= Joe Bretherton =

English rugby league footballer

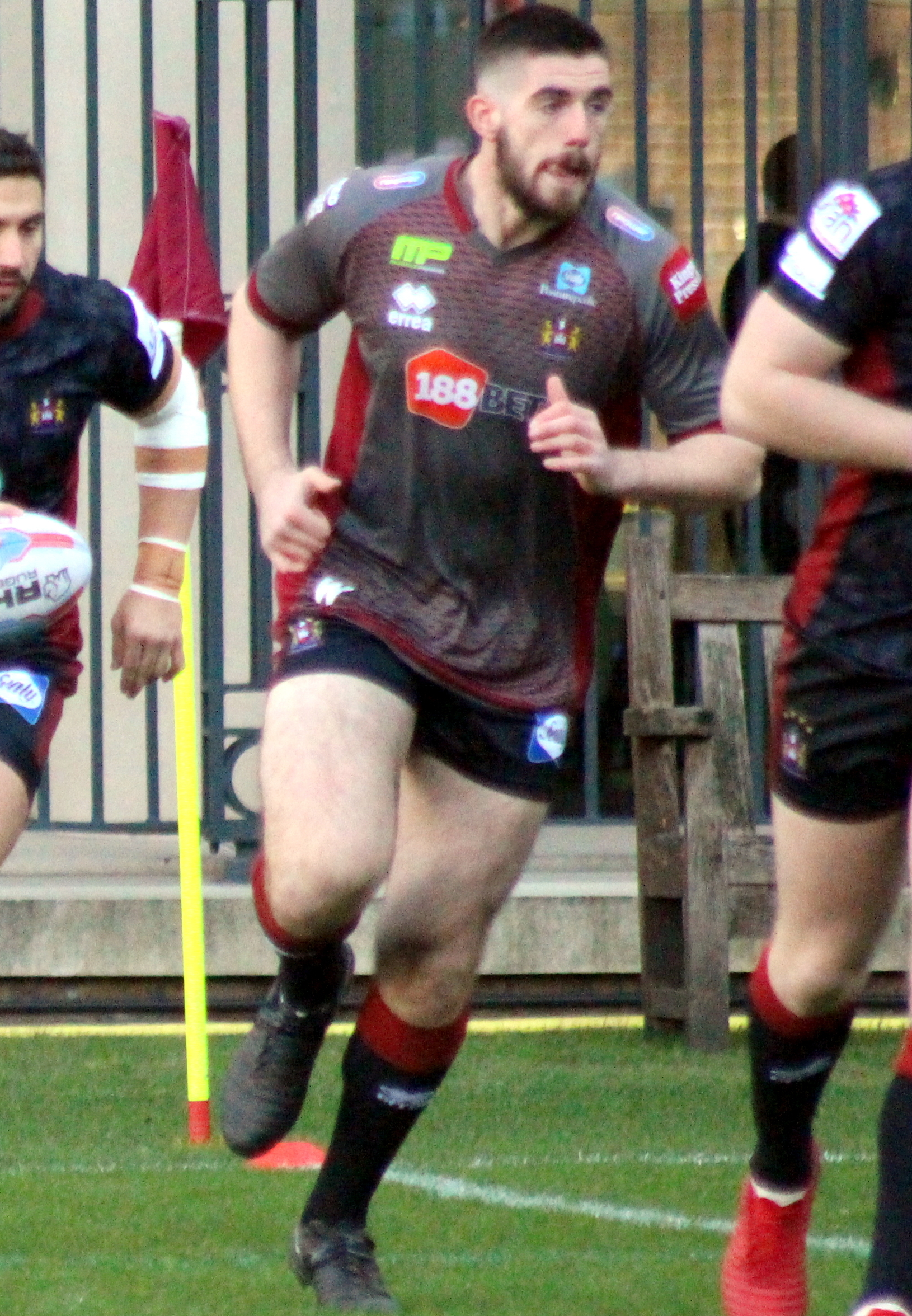

Personal information
- Full name: Joseph Bretherton
- Born: 5 October 1995 (age 31) Wigan, Greater Manchester, England
- Height: 6 ft 5 in (1.96 m)
- Weight: 16 st 7 lb (105 kg)

Playing information
- Position: Prop
Club
Years	Team	Pld	T	G	FG	P
2016–18	Wigan Warriors	17	1	0	0	4
2017(loan)	→ Swinton Lions	2	0	0	0	0
2017(loan)	→ Workington Town	1	0	0	0	0
2018(loan)	→ Toulouse Olympique	7	0	0	0	0
2018–26	Toulouse Olympique	128	32	0	0	128
2026–	Saint-Gaudens Bears	0	0	0	0	0
	Total	155	33	0	0	132
- Source: As of 3 November 2026

Joe Bretherton (born 5 October 1995) is a professional rugby league footballer who plays as a prop for Saint-Gaudens Bears in the Super XIII.

He previously played for Wigan Warriors and Toulouse Olympique in the Super League.

== Background ==
Bretherton was born in Wigan, Greater Manchester, England.

=== Saint-Gaudens Bears ===
On 3 November 2026 it was reported that he had signed for Saint-Gaudens Bears in the Super XIII
