= Mitch Garbutt =

Australian rugby league footballer

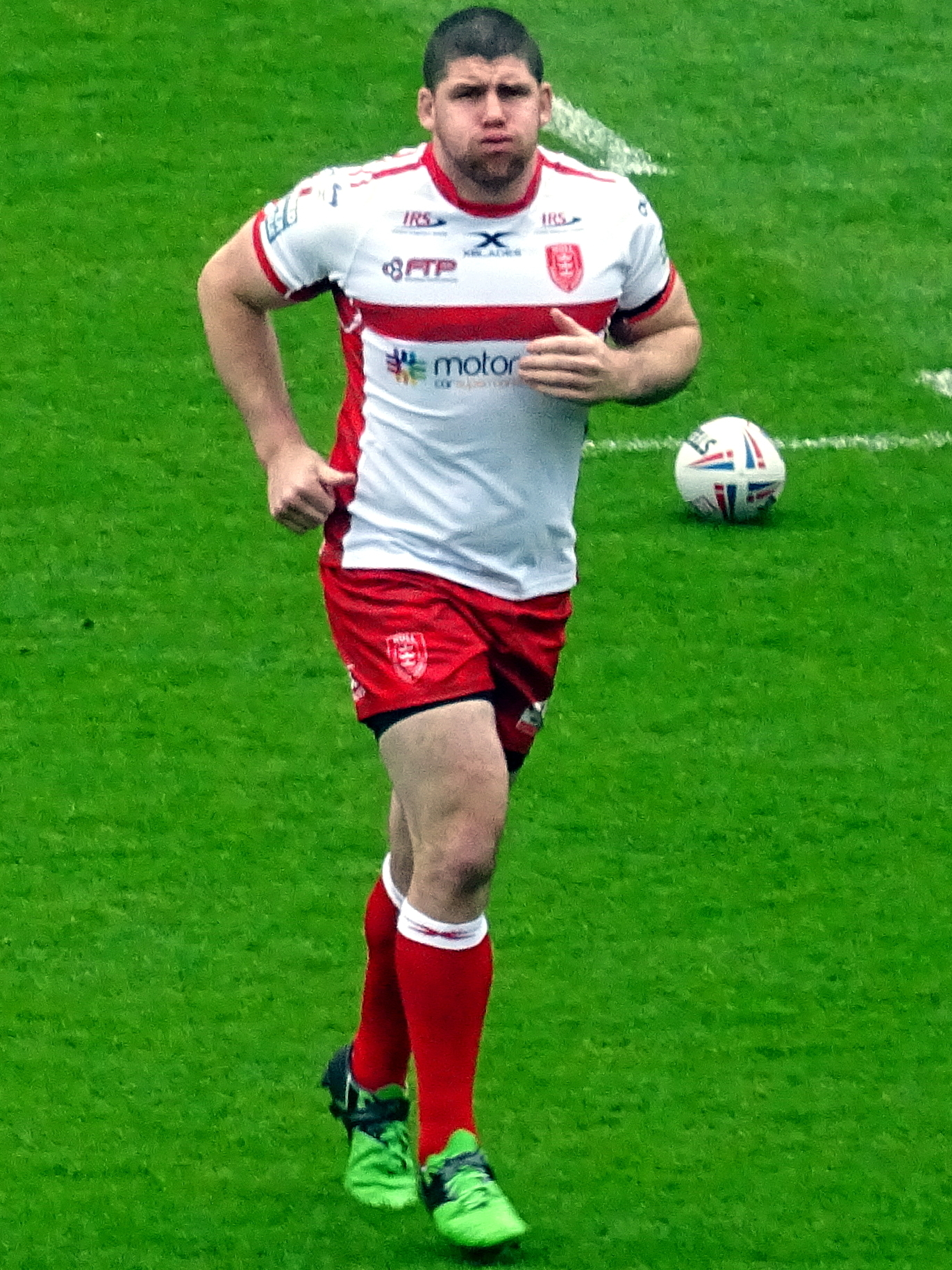

Personal information
- Full name: Mitchell Garbutt
- Born: 18 April 1989 (age 37) Newcastle, New South Wales, Australia
- Height: 6 ft 3 in (1.91 m)
- Weight: 17 st 11 lb (113 kg)

Playing information
- Position: Prop
Club
Years	Team	Pld	T	G	FG	P
2013–14	Melbourne Storm	9	0	0	0	0
2015	Brisbane Broncos	3	0	0	0	0
2015–18	Leeds Rhinos	72	9	0	0	36
2019–20	Hull Kingston Rovers	28	5	0	0	20
2021–22	Toulouse Olympique	21	7	0	0	28
2023–24	Saint-Gaudens Bears	36	3	0	0	12
	Total	169	24	0	0	96
Representative
Years	Team	Pld	T	G	FG	P
2015	Queensland Residents	1	0	0	0	0

Coaching information
Club
Years	Team	Gms	W	D	L	W%
2023	Saint-Gaudens Bears
- Source: As of 13 Aug 2024

Mitch Garbutt (born 18 April 1989) is an Australian former professional rugby league footballer who plays as a prop and is head-coach for Scone Thoroughbreds in the Group 21 Rugby League in New South Wales.

He has previously played for the Brisbane Broncos and the Melbourne Storm in the National Rugby League (NRL), and the Leeds Rhinos and Hull Kingston Rovers in the Super League.

He made his debut in the NRL in 2013.

== Background ==
Garbutt was born in Newcastle, New South Wales, Australia.

== Playing career ==
=== Early career ===
Garbutt played his junior football for the Western Suburbs Rosellas in the Newcastle Rugby League, before being signed by the Newcastle Knights.

==== 2008–2009 ====
In 2008 and 2009, Garbutt played for the Newcastle Knights' NYC team.

==== 2010 ====
In 2010, he returned to his junior club the Western Suburbs Rosellas.

==== 2011 ====
At the end of 2011, after impressing in the 2011 Newcastle Rugby League Grand Final between the Western Suburbs Rosellas and the Maitland Pickers, he signed a one-year contract with the Melbourne Storm starting in 2012, with an option for 2013.

=== Senior career ===
==== Melbourne Storm (2013–2014) ====
In round 14 of the 2013 NRL season, Garbutt made his National Rugby League début off the bench for the Melbourne Storm against his former club the Newcastle Knights. He played two further first-games for the Storm in 2013, and six more in 2014, all of them off the bench as well.

On 16 July 2014, Garbutt signed a two-year contract to play for the Brisbane Broncos commencing in 2015.

==== Brisbane Broncos (2015) ====
After playing only three first-grade games for the Brisbane club in Rounds 5, 6 and 7 in 2015, all of them off the interchange bench, Garbutt signed a 2 1/2-year contract on 24 June with Super League club the Leeds Rhinos, effective immediately, after being granted a release from his Brisbane Broncos' contract.

==== Leeds Rhinos (2015–2018) ====
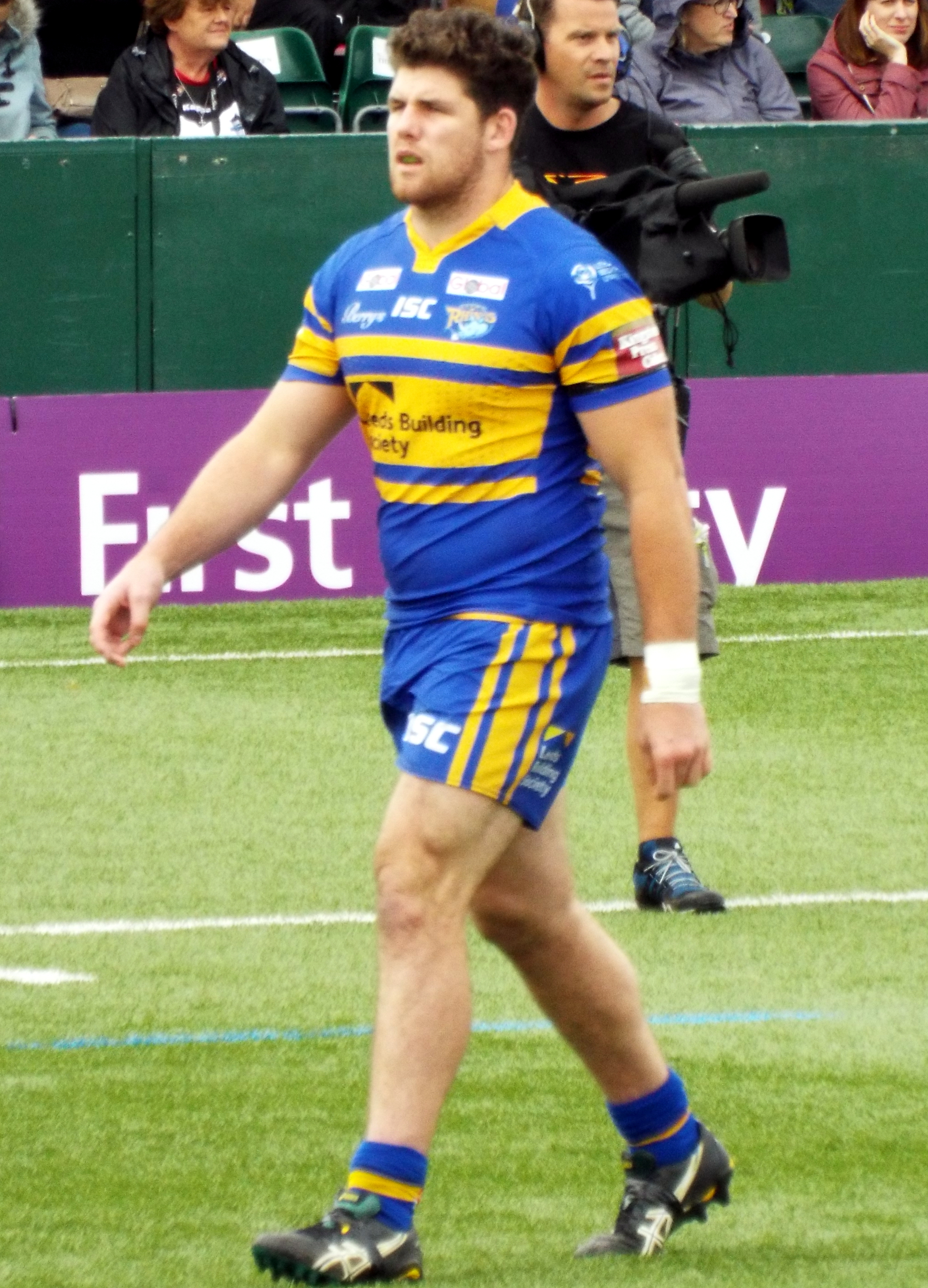
Garbutt playing for the Leeds Rhinos in 2016

Garbutt made his Leeds début on 3 July 2015, in a 46–18 victory over St. Helens. Garbutt was part of the Leeds side that won the domestic treble in 2015, lifting the League Leaders' Shield, Challenge Cup and the 2015 Super League Grand Final victory over the Wigan Warriors at Old Trafford.

His performances for the Leeds club were impressive since his début less than a year ago, but Garbutt became famous for his punch on Australian test prop, James Tamou in the 2016 World Club Challenge, in a 4–38 defeat against the North Queensland Cowboys for which he later apologised for. Garbutt was subsequently also part of Leeds 2017 Super League Grand Final winning squad, beating Castleford, 6–24 at Old Trafford. The 2018 Super League season would prove to be Garbutt's last at the Leeds club, ending a four-year stay with the club where he won every domestic honour as a team available.

==== Hull Kingston Rovers (2019–2020) ====
On 9 January 2019, Garbutt received the number 14 jersey ahead of the start of the Super League season. On 13 January 2019, Garbutt made his non-competitive Hull Kingston Rovers' début in a pre-season friendly against the Widnes Vikings, Garbutt claimed a 30–16 victory with his new club. Garbutt made his first competitive appearance for Hull Kingston Rovers in round 1 of the 2019 Super League season, Garbutt who scored a try on his début, went onto record a thrilling 18–16 victory over cross-city rivals Hull F.C. at Craven Park.

==== Toulouse Olympique ====
On 28 July 2020, it was announced that Garbutt would join Toulouse Olympique for the 2021 season. On 10 October 2021, Garbutt played for Toulouse in their victory over Featherstone in the Million Pound Game which saw the club promoted to the Super League for the first time in their history.

==== York Knights ====
On 10 Aug 2024 he announced his retirement as a rugby league professional following York's 54-12 win over Dewsbury Rams in R19 of the 2024 season.

== Honours ==
=== Club (Leeds Rhinos 2015–2018) ===
- Super League (2): 2015, 2017
- League Leaders' Shield (1): 2015
- Challenge Cup (1): 2015
