= Jy Hitchcox =

Australian professional rugby league footballer

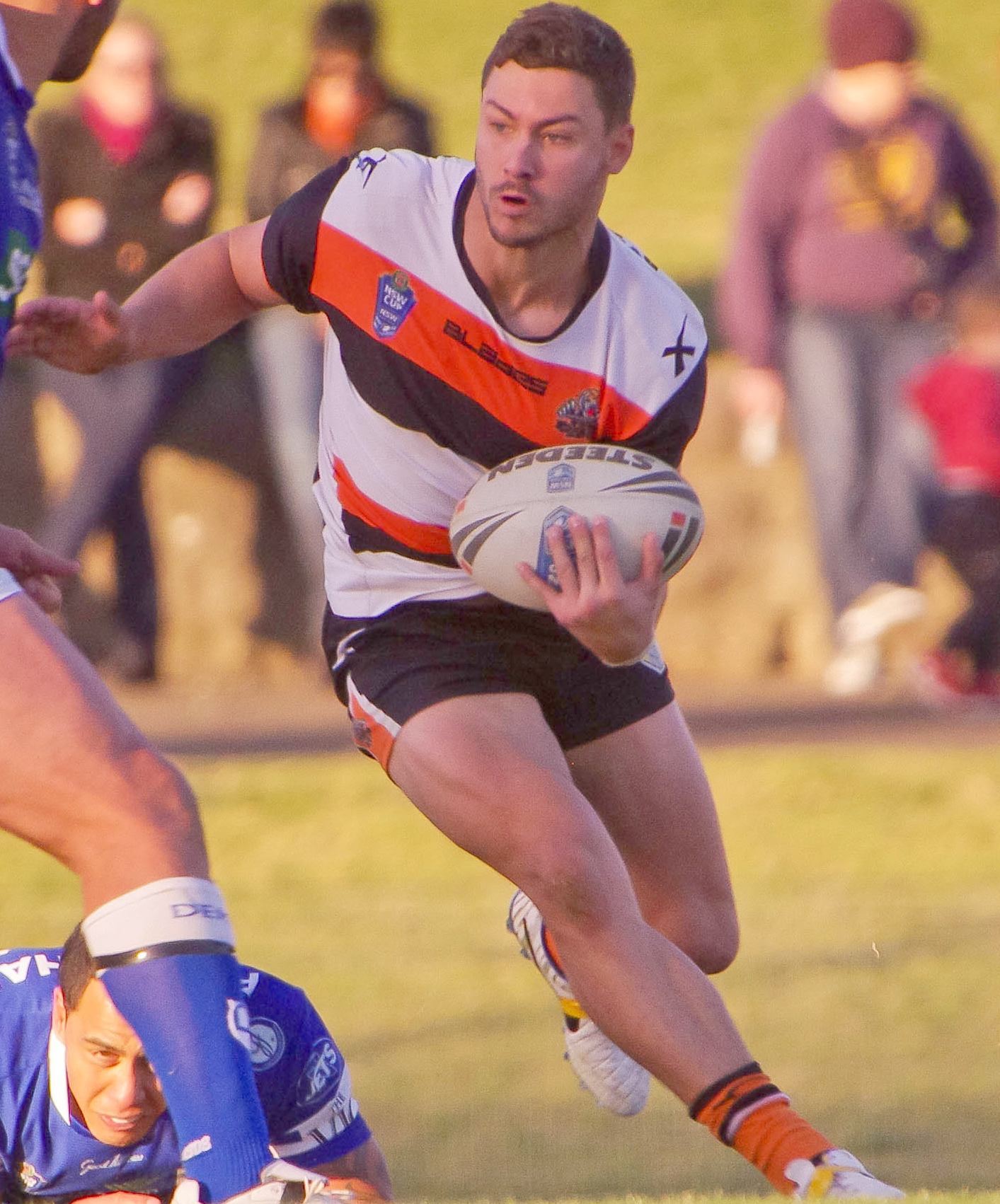

Personal information
- Born: 18 August 1989 (age 37) Byron Bay, New South Wales, Australia
- Height: 176 cm (5 ft 9 in)
- Weight: 87 kg (13 st 10 lb)

Playing information
- Position: Fullback, Wing, Centre
Club
Years	Team	Pld	T	G	FG	P
2014	Wests Tigers	4	1	0	0	4
2015	Featherstone Rovers	25	11	0	0	44
2016–18	Castleford Tigers	28	20	0	0	80
2017(loan)	→ Batley Bulldogs	2	1	0	0	4
2018(loan)	→ Halifax	1	0	0	0	0
2018(loan)	→ Bradford Bulls	8	11	0	0	44
2019	Bradford Bulls	13	6	0	0	24
2020–21	Toulouse Olympique	14	13	0	0	52
2022	Leigh Centurions	5	2	0	0	8
2022(loan)	→ Rochdale Hornets	12	8	0	0	32
	Total	112	73	0	0	292
- Source: As of 5 January 2023

Jy Hitchcox (born 18 August 1989) is an Australian former professional rugby league footballer who played as a fullback, wing and centre for the Western Suburbs Red Devils in the Country Rugby League and the Illawarra Rugby League premiership.

He previously played for the Wests Tigers in the NRL, Featherstone Rovers in the Championship and the Castleford Tigers in the Super League. Hitchcox spent time away from Castleford at the Batley Bulldogs and Halifax in the Championship, and at Bradford in League 1. He later joined the Bradford Bulls on a permanent deal in the second tier.

Jy was the only player to score on debut in all tiers of professional Rugby League in both hemispheres.

== Background ==
Hitchcox was born in Byron Bay, New South Wales, Australia.

He played his junior football for the Mullumbimby Giants before being signed by the Gold Coast Titans. As a youngster, Hitchcox played for the Australian Schoolboys Under-18s team.

== Playing career ==
=== Australia ===
In 2009, Hitchcox played for the Gold Coast Titans' NYC team.

In 2010, Hitchcox joined the Melbourne Storm.

After a stint with Manly RUFC in the Shute Shield, Hitchcox joined the Wests Tigers in 2012.

In Round 23 of the 2014 NRL season, Hitchcox made his NRL début for the Wests Tigers against the Sydney Roosters. He scored a try on debut.

=== England ===
On 19 December 2014, Hitchcox signed a two-year contract with Featherstone Rovers in the Championship starting in 2015.

=== Castleford Tigers ===
In November 2015, Hitchcox signed a 1-year contract with Super League team Castleford Tigers starting in 2016.

Hitchcox scored 2 tries in his début for Castleford in a live televised game against Hull F.C.

He played in the 2017 Super League Grand Final defeat by the Leeds Rhinos at Old Trafford.

=== Leigh Centurions ===
On 29 Oct 2021 it was reported that he had signed for Leigh Centurions in the RFL Championship
