= Kingston Park =

Area of Newcastle upon Tyne, England

Coordinates: 55.012°N 1.666°W

Kingston Park,
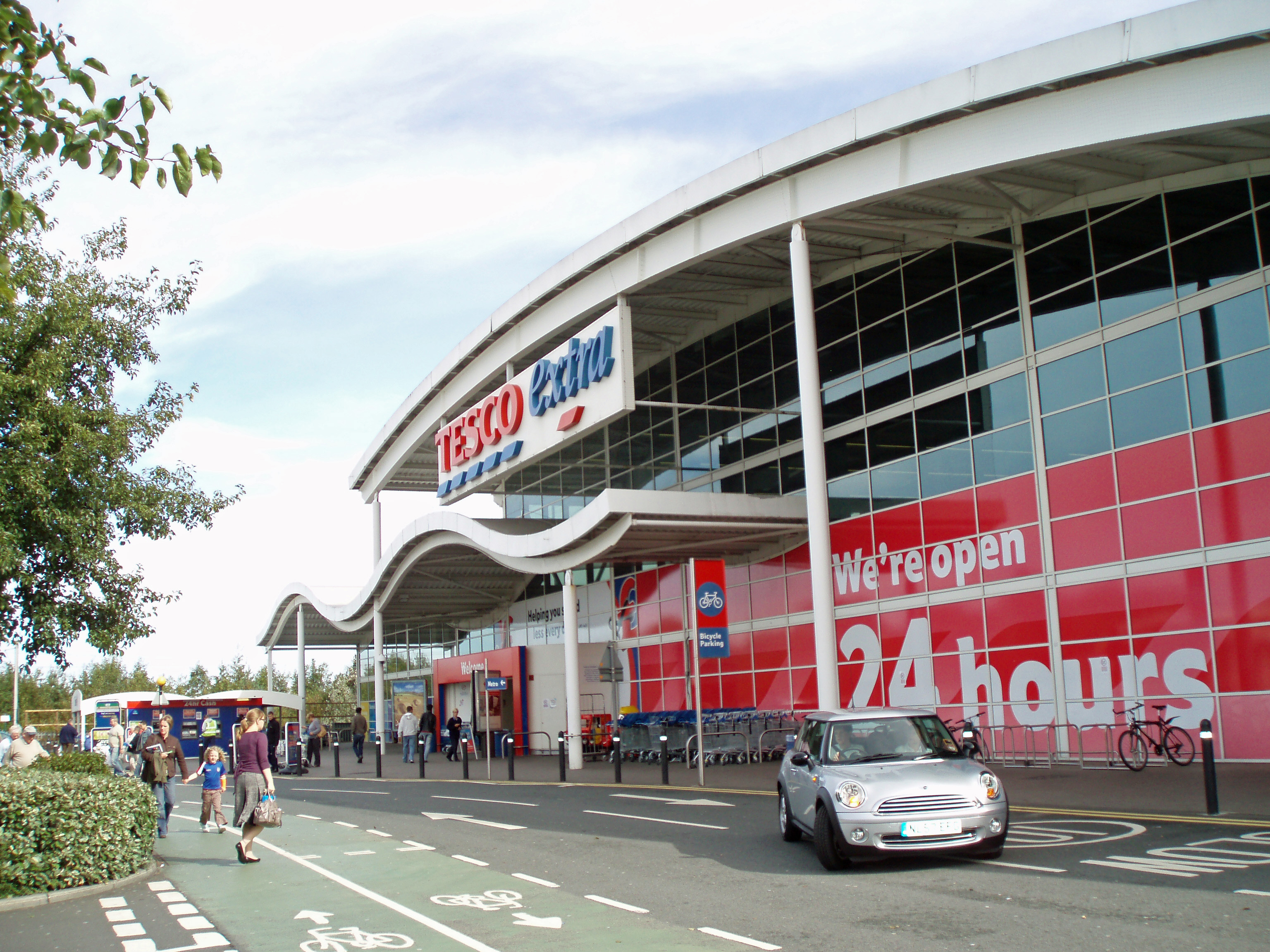
- Tesco Kingston Park (2007)

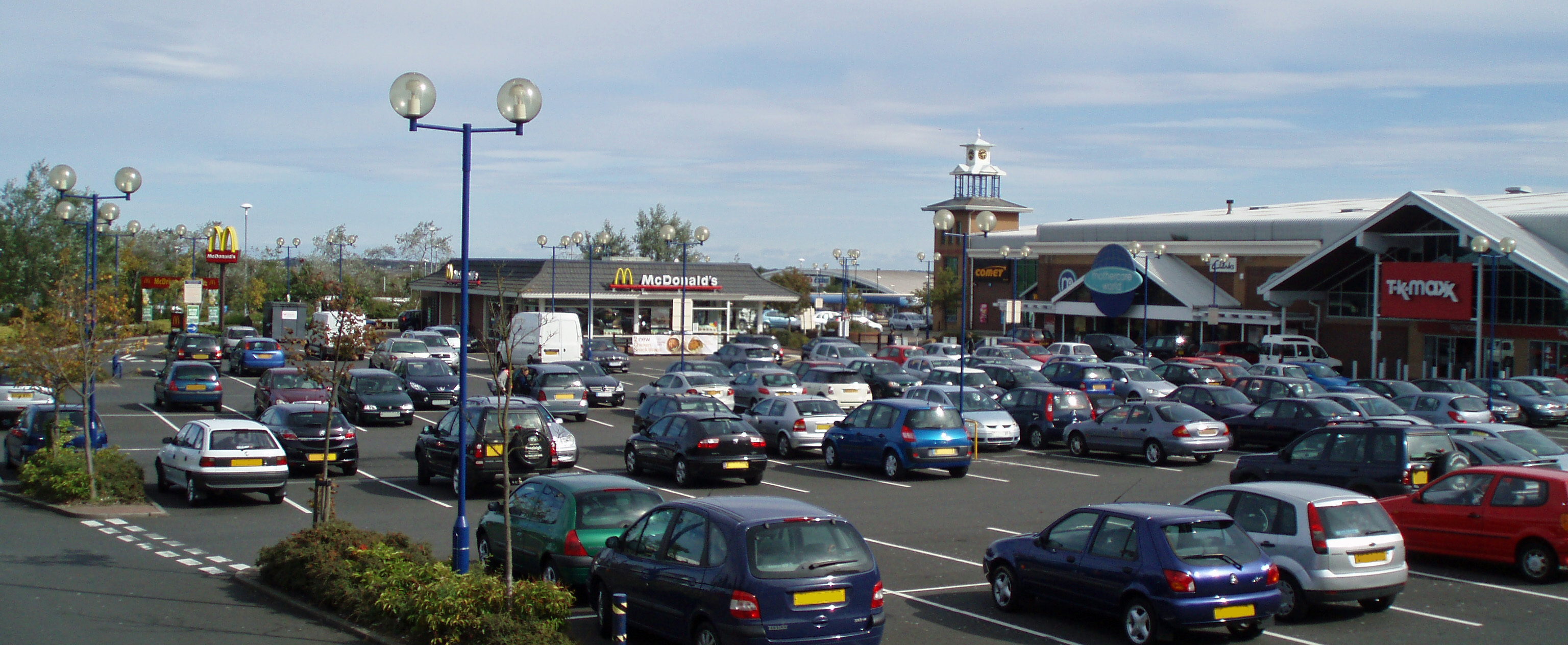

- Location within Tyne and Wear
- OS grid reference: NZ214686
  - London: 242 miles (389 km)
- Metropolitan borough: Newcastle upon Tyne
- Metropolitan county: Tyne and Wear
- Region: North East
- Country: England
- Sovereign state: United Kingdom
- Post town: NEWCASTLE UPON TYNE
- Postcode district: NE3
- Dialling code: 0191
- Police: Northumbria
- Fire: Tyne and Wear
- Ambulance: North East
- UK Parliament: Newcastle upon Tyne North

Kingston Park is a suburb of Newcastle upon Tyne, about 4 miles (6 km) north west of the city centre.

It is home to several large retailers, the largest being one of Tesco's flagship stores—at 11,055 square metres (119,000 sq ft) which was also the largest supermarket in the United Kingdom for one period of time. Kingston Park is served by Kingston Park station on the Tyne and Wear Metro.

== History ==
The area was largely built between the end of the 1970s and beginning of the 1980s. Its Metro station was not part of the original system, the area not having the required population density when the network was first planned. In the 2010s, the Newcastle Great Park development began to extend north from Kingston Park, with the Greenside Estate being located immediately north of Kingston Park Road.

The residential areas were originally named Kingston Park, Kenton Bank Foot, Tudor Grange and Ouseburn Park, although over time all of these have come to be known collectively as Kingston Park. Most of the housing to the south of Kingston Park Metro station was built by developers such as Leech and originally sold on a leasehold basis.

Some of the housing to the north of the station was built as council owned rented properties, although many were bought by tenants under the Government's right-to-buy scheme. Further housing development is planned on the fringes of Kingston Park at Kenton Bank Foot and Callerton, in areas once part of the Green Belt.

=== Commercial areas ===
Kingston Retail Park has a number of shops and the area has a Tesco store. The Airport Industrial Estate is also located in Kingston Park.

== Kingston Park stadium ==
The area houses the Kingston Park Stadium, which is home to the Newcastle Falcons rugby union team, and also hosts the home football fixtures of Newcastle United's reserve team. The Falcons, then known as Newcastle Gosforth, moved into Kingston Park Stadium in 1990; prior to this, the site had been the Newcastle Chronicle and Journal Sports Ground.

== Transport ==
Kingston Park also has a Tyne and Wear Metro station, with direct services to Newcastle Airport, Newcastle City Centre, Gateshead and Sunderland. It was opened on 15 September 1985, four years after the Metro line had begun service.

== Schools ==
Kingston Park Primary School is based in Kingston Park. There are about 350 pupils from Nursery to Year 6. The majority of Year 6 pupils go up to Kenton School.

=== Youth groups ===
There are several youth groups in and around the area of Kingston Park. One such group is 733 (Newcastle Airport) Squadron of the Air Training Corps (ATC).

== Health care ==
Kingston Park has medical practices, including The Park Medical Group, and dentists, including Kingston Park Advanced Dentistry.

== See also ==
- Kingston Park Metro station
