= Mark Kheirallah =

France international rugby league footballer

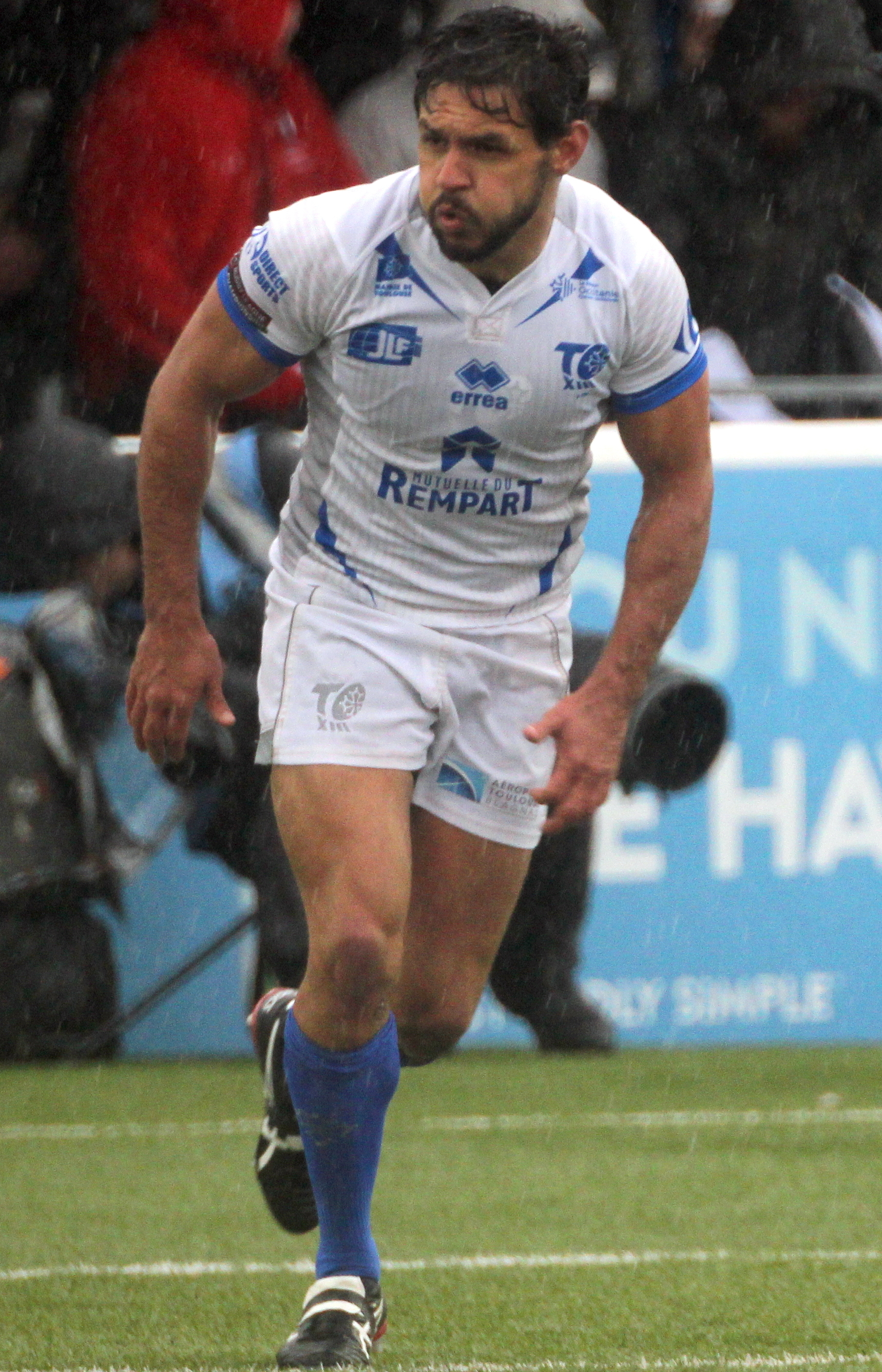

Personal information
- Born: 15 February 1990 (age 36) Darlinghurst, New South Wales, Australia
- Height: 177 cm (5 ft 10 in)
- Weight: 83 kg (13 st 1 lb)

Playing information
- Position: Fullback, Scrum-half
Club
Years	Team	Pld	T	G	FG	P
2011	Sydney Roosters	1	0	0	0	0
2012–22	Toulouse Olympique	129	98	492	1	1377
2022–23	Featherstone Rovers	24	17	13	0	94
	Total	154	115	505	1	1471
Representative
Years	Team	Pld	T	G	FG	P
2017	France	4	1	0	0	4
- Source: As of 11 October 2023
- Relatives: Steve Linnane (uncle)

Mark Kheirallah (Arabic: مارك خير الله; born 15 February 1990), also known by the nickname of "Killer", is a former France international rugby league footballer who last played as a fullback or scrum-half for Featherstone Rovers in the Championship.

He previously played for the Sydney Roosters in the National Rugby League.

== Background ==
He was born in Darlinghurst, New South Wales, Australia. Kheirallah of Indigenous Australian and Egyptian descent.

== Playing career ==
Kheirallah played his junior football for Mascot Jets before being signed by the South Sydney Rabbitohs. He played for the Rabbitohs' S. G. Ball Cup team in 2008 and was a part of the Rabbitohs' NYC squad in 2009 but didn't play a game.

=== Sydney Roosters ===
In 2010, Kheirallah joined the Sydney Roosters. He played for the Roosters' NYC team in 2010 before moving on to the Roosters' NSW Cup, Newtown Jets in 2011.

In Round 17 of the 2011 NRL season, Kheirallah made his NRL debut for the Roosters against the Canberra Raiders.

=== Newtown Jets ===
At the end of 2012, Kheirallah played in the Jets' 2012 New South Wales Cup Grand Final win over the Balmain Ryde-Eastwood Tigers.

=== Toulouse Olympique ===
In October 2012, Kheirallah signed with Toulouse Olympique in the Elite One Championship. In 2013, Kheirallah joined the Kurri Kurri Bulldogs in the Newcastle Rugby League. He played in the Bulldogs' Grand Final loss to the Western Suburbs Rosellas before returning to Toulouse in France.

In April 2014, Kheirallah played in Toulouse Olympique's Lord Derby Cup Final win over AS Carcassonne, scoring 3 tries, kicking 6 goals and winning the Man of the Match award in the game. In June 2014, Kheirallah joined the Wyong Roos in the NSW Cup. He again returned to France following his spell with Wyong, playing for Toulouse in their inaugural League 1 season in 2016 where he finished as the competition's top points scorer and was nominated for the league's player of the year. After qualifying on residency, Kheirallah was included in France's squad for the 2017 World Cup. On 10 October 2021, he played for Toulouse in their victory over Featherstone in the Million Pound Game which saw the club promoted to the Super League for the first time in their history. On 16 March 2022 his contract with Toulouse was terminated for gross misconduct.

=== Featherstone Rovers ===
On 27 March 2022 Featherstone announced that they had signed Kheirallah. On 28 May 2022, he played for Featherstone in their 2022 RFL 1895 Cup final loss against Leigh.

On 11 Oct 2023 he announced his retirement from the professional game

== Personal life ==
Kheirallah is the nephew of Steve Linnane.
