= Bower Fold =

Stadium in Stalybridge, England

Coordinates: 53°28′31″N 2°02′38″W

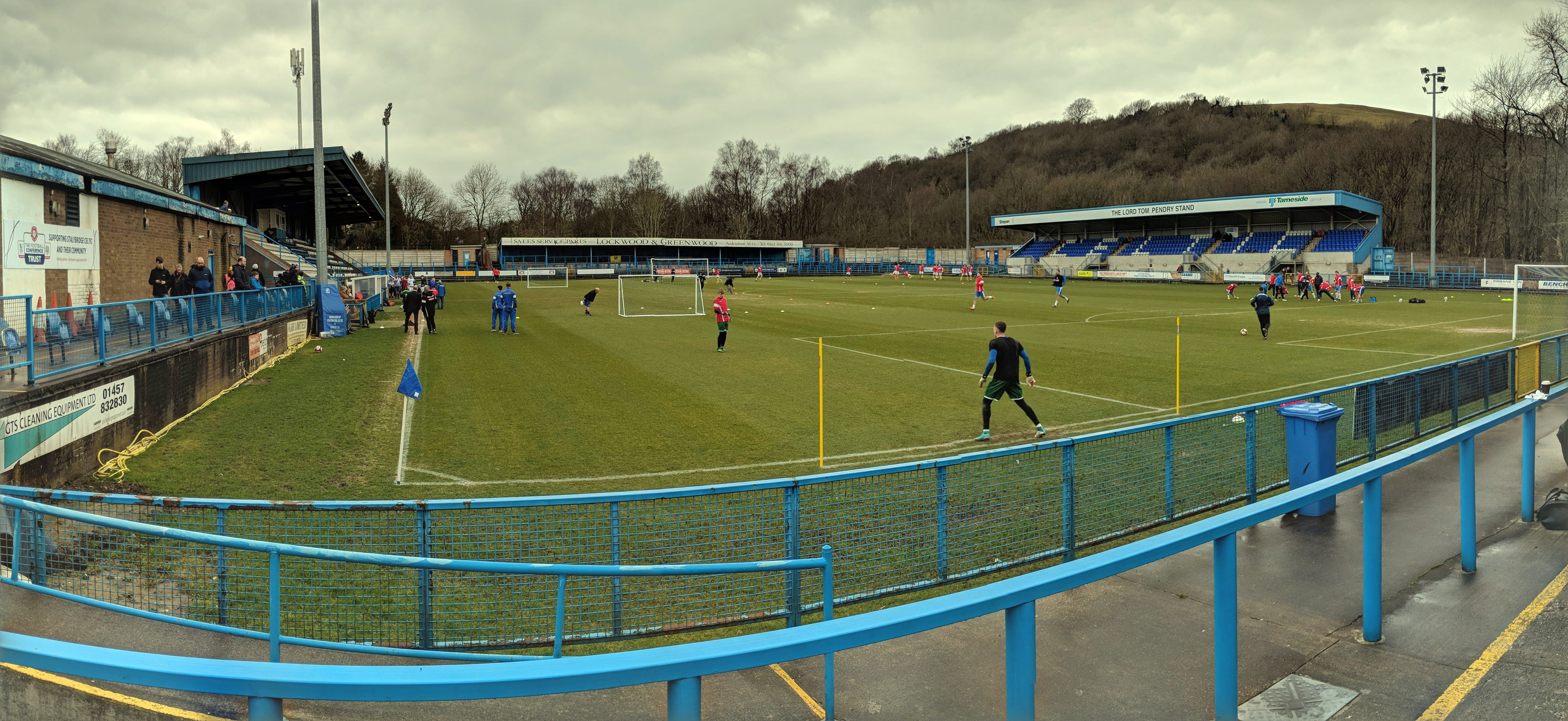
- Interactive map of Bower Fold
- Location: Mottram Road; Stalybridge; Cheshire; SK15 2RT
- Owner: Stalybridge Celtic
- Operator: Stalybridge Celtic
- Capacity: 6,500 (1,200 seated)
- Surface: Grass

Tenants
- Stalybridge Celtic (1909–present); F.C. United of Manchester (2014); Oldham RLFC (2016–2017, 2020–2021, 2026-present)

Bower Fold in Stalybridge, Greater Manchester, England, is the home ground of Stalybridge Celtic football club and Oldham R.L.F.C..

== History ==
There has been a ground at Bower Fold since 1906. The current main stand was built in 1996, with the covered stand at the Town End (Joe Jackson Stand) dating from 1994. The main stand replaced a wooden one dating from 1909, which held 500 fans, before being converted to tip-up seating with a reduced capacity of around 400 persons. The Lord Pendry Stand (named after the local politician Tom Pendry) opened in 2004, replacing a covered terrace dating from the 1950s. The Mottram End cover stems from construction starting in the 1970s and finishing in the mid-1980s. The main stand, holding about 700 people, is all seated. Its opposite stand, the Lord Pendry stand has 652 seats.

It is possible for the ground to be segregated with self-contained areas which include separate turnstiles, refreshment facilities and toilets (though this is rarely necessary). The away fans' area in this case is uncovered. The next area (clockwise from the away fans' area) around the ground is the Lockwood and Greenwood stand which is a covered standing area. This area is popular with home fans when Stalybridge are kicking towards this goal. Next is an uncovered standing area, followed by the Lord Pendry Stand (a seated area) with a capacity of approximately three hundred. Next is a small uncovered area followed by the covered Joe Jackson stand. The club shop and bar are behind this stand. Away fans are allowed to use the bar and there is no admission charge. Next are the main turnstiles, refreshment facilities and disabled spectators' area.

== Capacity ==
Capacity is currently 6,500 with 1,200 seats. Attendances for Stalybridge Celtic have been well short of capacity, with average crowds in the 2008–09 and 2009–10 seasons being around 500.

Before the construction of their own ground, F.C. United of Manchester used the ground for some home games from 2009 whenever Gigg Lane was unavailable, usually when Bury were scheduled to play a home game on the same day. FC United generally exceeded Stalybridge's home attendances when they played at Bower Fold. Bower Fold was F.C. United's official home ground for the first half of the 2014–15 season.

The record attendance at Bower Fold stands at 10,400, though unofficial estimates range from 12,000 to 13,500. This was achieved on 8 February 1921 when Dick Kerr Ladies beat a Rest of Lancashire XI 10–0. £600 was raised for the Ashton-under-Lyne Infirmary, which forms part of Tameside Hospital. Stalybridge Celtic's record attendance was achieved on 17 January 1923, against West Bromwich Albion. 9,753 spectators saw Stalybridge Celtic lose 2–0 in a F.A. Cup First Round Proper replay.

It was announced in December 2015 that Oldham RLFC would play their home games at Bower Fold from 2016 onward, as their previous home was seen as unfit to host Championship rugby competitions. On 5 November 2019 it was announce that Oldham would be returning to Bower Fold after the Rugby Football League informed the club that the Vestacare Stadium the club's home for the past two seasons did not meet the standards for Championship rugby.
