= Rémi Casty =

France international rugby league footballer

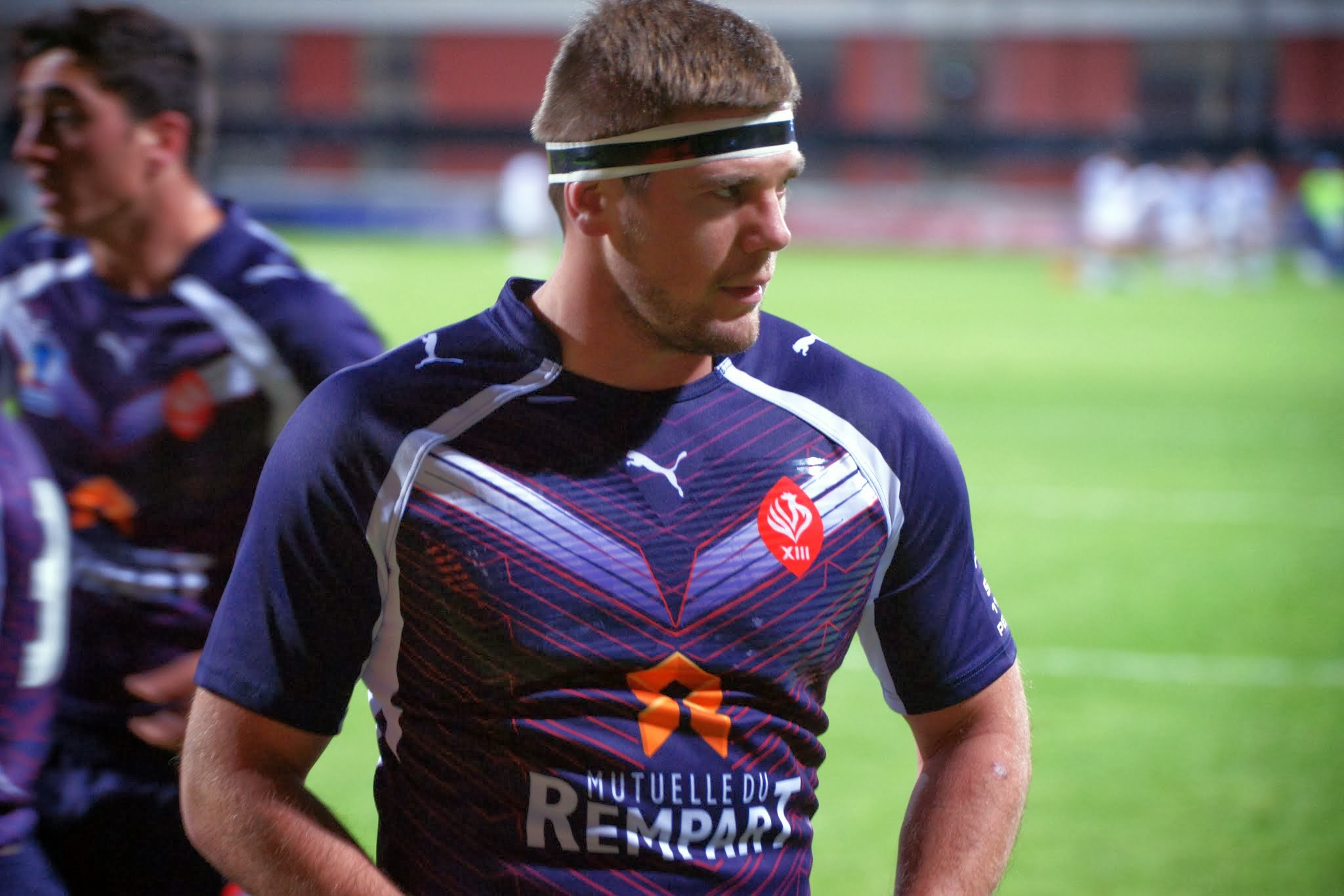

Personal information
- Full name: Rémi Casty
- Born: 5 February 1985 (age 41) Narbonne, France
- Height: 6 ft 0 in (1.83 m)

Playing information
- Position: Prop, Loose forward, Second-row
Club
Years	Team	Pld	T	G	FG	P
2006–13	Catalans Dragons	188	27	0	0	108
2014	Sydney Roosters	12	2	0	0	8
2015–20	Catalans Dragons	149	9	0	0	36
2021	Toulouse Olympique	13	5	0	0	20
	Total	362	43	0	0	172
Representative
Years	Team	Pld	T	G	FG	P
2004–16	France	25	2	0	0	8

Coaching information
Club
Years	Team	Gms	W	D	L	W%
2024–26	St-Estève XIII Catalan
2026–	FC Lézignan
	Total	0	0	0	0
- Source: As of 3 November 2026

Rémi Casty, born on 5 February 1985 in Narbonne (Aude), is a French international rugby league player who became a coach after his playing career. Primarily a prop, he also played as a second-row forward and loose forward. His playing career spanned from the 2000s to 2021.

Casty began playing rugby league at Ornaisons before joining FC Lézignan. In 2005, he moved to Union Treiziste Catalane, which became the Catalans Dragons the following year. He quickly established himself as one of the club's leading forwards and played in the 2007 Challenge Cup final. An emblematic figure at the Dragons, where he later became captain, he spent most of his career in Perpignan and was named in the Super League Dream Team twice, in 2012 and 2018.

In 2014, Casty moved to Australia to play in the National Rugby League (NRL) with the Sydney Roosters. During his time there, he won the World Club Challenge before returning to the Catalans Dragons for the following season. In 2018, he captained the French club to victory in the 2018 Challenge Cup final at Wembley Stadium, securing the first major trophy in the Dragons' history. After his final season with the Catalans in 2020, he joined Toulouse Olympique and ended his playing career by winning the Championship in 2021.

At international level, Casty represented France between 2004 and 2016, earning 25 caps and taking part in the 2008 and 2013 Rugby League World Cup tournaments.

Following his retirement as a player, Casty moved into coaching. He served as an assistant coach at Toulouse Olympique in 2022 before becoming head coach of the France under-19 national team in 2023. He subsequently joined the coaching staff of Saint-Estève XIII Catalan, the Catalans Dragons' reserve team, before taking over as head coach. In June 2026, he was appointed head coach of FC Lézignan for the 2026–27 season.

== Biography ==
=== Early life and rugby league beginnings at Ornaisons and Lézignan ===
Rémi Casty was born on 5 February 1985 in Narbonne, Aude, France. His father, Jacky Casty, served as mayor of Ornaisons, a commune in the Aude department, from 1976 to 2014. He was also a high-level rugby league player, winning the French Cup in 1970 with FC Lézignan, where he played as a stand-off and later became captain. Rémi has a brother, Benjamin Casty, who is a rugby league player and referee. He grew up in Ornaisons.

Born into a rugby league family, Casty took up the sport at an early age, joining his village club, US Ornaisons. During his childhood, he moved to neighbouring FC Lézignan, where he earned his first selections for the French national youth teams. He made his debut in the French Championship at the age of 18 during the 2003–04 season.

Over the following two seasons, he gained experience at senior level and received his first call-up to the senior France national team for the 2004 Mediterranean Cup, in which France faced Morocco and Serbia. He was subsequently called up for an unofficial international match against Australia, scheduled for 21 November 2004. Casty, the only Lézignan player selected, was included in the squad following the withdrawal of Sébastien Raguin, who had suffered an eye injury. He played in the match, which France lost 52–30 in front of approximately 8,500 spectators at the Stade Ernest-Wallon in Toulouse.

=== 2005–2013: Key player for the Catalans Dragons and France ===
==== 2006: Super League debut with the Catalans Dragons ====
During the summer of 2005, aged 20, Rémi Casty left FC Lézignan to join the Perpignan-based project of Union Treiziste Catalane (UTC), led by Bernard Guasch, whose aim was to establish a French team in the English professional Super League. With a squad featuring numerous French internationals and Australian players preparing for their scheduled Super League debut in February 2006, Casty initially competed in the French Championship with UTC, which had become the reserve team of the newly formed Catalans Dragons.

Rémi Casty's Super League debut
Harlequins RL 36–14 Catalans Dragons
Catalans Dragons line-up

Renaud Guigue – Justin Murphy, Julien Touxagas, Mark Hughes, Bruno Vergès – Sean Rudder (SO), Michael Dobson (SH) – Chris Beattie, Julien Rinaldi, Jérôme Guisset, Jamal Fakir, Grégory Mounis, John Wilson – Pascal Jampy, David Berthezène, Adel Fellous, Rémi Casty – Head coach: Mick Potter

On 1 April 2006, Casty received his first call-up to the Catalans Dragons' first team for a Challenge Cup fourth-round match against English amateur side Thornhill Trojans. Under head coach Mick Potter, the Dragons secured a 66–0 victory, with Casty scoring two tries, and progressed to the next round Six weeks later, on 14 May 2006, he made his Super League debut against the Harlequins RL in a 36–14 defeat.. At 21, Casty was regarded as one of the club's most promising young players, alongside Grégory Mounis, Thomas Bosc, Julien Touxagas, Younès Khattabi and Jamal Fakir. He made eight first-team appearances that season, including six in Super League against established clubs such as the Wigan Warriors, Hull F.C. and Bradford Bulls. In each of his Super League appearances, he started on the interchange bench before entering the field of play.

==== 2007–2008: First Challenge Cup final at Wembley, emergence and World Cup in Australia ====
2007 Challenge Cup Final at Wembley

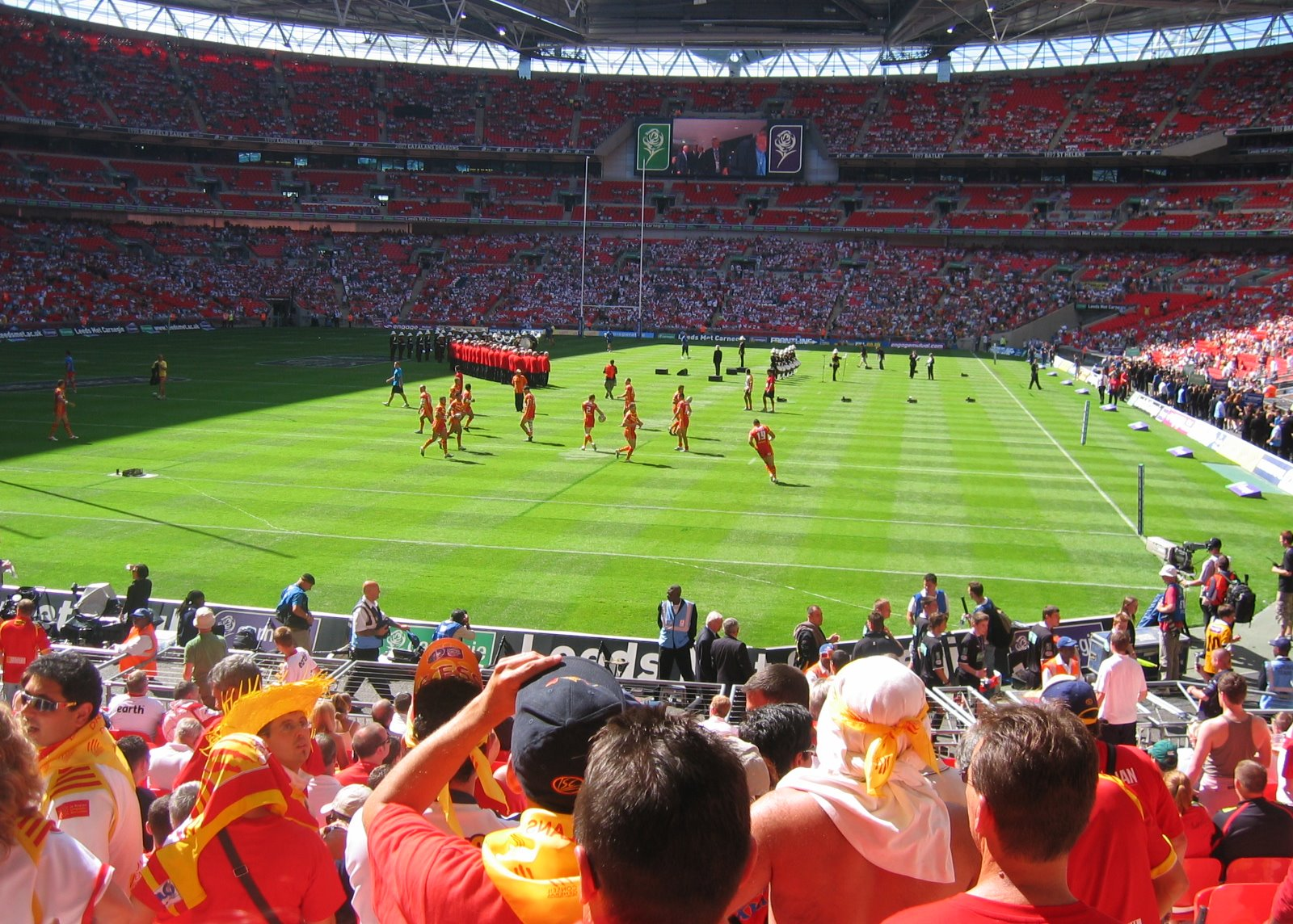

St Helens 30–8 Catalans Dragons
Catalans Dragons line-up
Clint Greenshields – Justin Murphy, John Wilson, Sébastien Raguin, Younès Khattabi – Adam Mogg (SO), Stacey Jones (SH, c) – Jérôme Guisset, Luke Quigley, Alex Chan, Jason Croker, Cyrille Gossard, Grégory Mounis – Rémi Casty, David Ferriol, Vincent Duport, Kane Bentley – Head coach: Mick Potter

For their second season in Super League, the Catalans Dragons underwent significant changes to their playing squad, with numerous departures and new signings. Casty retained the confidence of head coach Mick Potter, who increasingly established him as an important member of the team. He made twelve appearances for the Dragons during the season. On 31 March 2007, he made his first start at prop in a Challenge Cup match against Featherstone Rovers His first Super League start followed on 5 May against London's Harlequins, before he scored his first Super League try against the Wakefield Trinity Wildcats on 1 September.. That season, the Catalans Dragons enjoyed an impressive run in the Challenge Cup. Although Casty did not feature in the quarter-final against Hull F.C. or the semi-final against Wigan Warriors, he was selected for the final. Reaching Wembley in only their second season in Super League was a major achievement for the French club, which became the first non-English team to contest a Challenge Cup final. On 25 August 2007, the Dragons faced St Helens at the newly rebuilt Wembley Stadium, which had opened earlier that year. In front of 84,241 spectators, including approximately 4,000 French supporters, the Catalans were defeated 30–8. After the match, Casty expressed his frustration over St Helens' second try, which he believed had resulted from a forward pass. In his view, the decision had proved decisive in allowing the English side to establish a 12–4 lead before half-time.

In 2008, Casty established himself as a regular member of the Catalans squad. Frequently deployed as an impact player from the interchange bench, he made 28 appearances and scored two tries, including a decisive try in a victory over St Helens during the sixth round of Super League. Under Potter, the Catalans continued their rise in Super League. The 2008 season was particularly important for the club's future, as it had benefited from an exemption from relegation during its first two seasons in 2006 and 2007. Its performance in 2008 would help determine whether it could secure a three-year Super League licence. After a difficult start, the Dragons moved into the top three following round 12 and remained there until the end of the 27-round regular season, finishing behind St Helens and the Leeds Rhinos. In the opening round of the play-offs, Casty and the Catalans defeated the Warrington Wolves 46–8. Their campaign ended in the following round, however, with a 50–26 home defeat to fourth-placed Wigan Warriors at the Stade Gilbert Brutus, in front of nearly 10,000 spectators.

France squad for the 2008 Rugby League World Cup
France 36–18 Scotland

France 6–42 Fiji
France 10–42 Samoa

France squad
Éric Anselme, Jean-Philippe Baile, Jean-Christophe Borlin, Thomas Bosc, Laurent Carrasco, Rémi Casty, Olivier Elima, Jamal Fakir, Adel Fellous, Maxime Grésèque, Mathieu Griffi, Jérôme Guisset (c), Christophe Moly, Grégory Mounis, Justin Murphy, Dimitri Pelo, Sébastien Planas, Sébastien Raguin, Julien Rinaldi, Teddy Sadaoui, Jared Taylor, John Wilson and James Wynne – Head coach: John Monie

At the end of the year, Casty took part in the 2008 Rugby League World Cup, held in Australia from 25 October to 17 November. On 24 September, France's Australian head coach John Monie announced his 23-man squad, which included Casty and eleven other Catalans Dragons players. The French team completed a week-long training camp at Tignes, at an altitude of 2,100 metres, before departing France on 11 October. They established their World Cup base in Caloundra, near Brisbane, ahead of their opening match against Scotland on 26 October and their second fixture against Fiji on 1 November. France needed to win both matches to secure qualification for the quarter-finals. France opened their World Cup campaign with a 36–18 victory over Scotland, with Casty entering the match from the interchange bench. He was retained for the second match against Fiji, again beginning on the interchange bench. France were, however, weakened by the absence of two important players, hooker Julien Rinaldi and second-row forward Éric Anselme, both injured. The match turned into a nightmare for the French side, who suffered a 42–6 defeat against an enterprising Fijian team, ending their hopes of reaching the quarter-finals. For their final classification match against Samoa, Casty was omitted from the matchday squad to allow other players an opportunity to participate in the tournament. He watched his teammates suffer a 42–10 defeat, leaving France in tenth and last place in the tournament.

==== 2009: First Super League semi-final ====
Following their third-place finish in the 2008 regular season, the Catalans Dragons hoped to build on their progress under new head coach Kevin Walters. Casty continued to be deployed primarily as an impact player from the interchange bench and made 29 appearances for the Catalans during the season. In preparation for the season, Casty and the other players who had participated in the World Cup returned to training three weeks later than the rest of the squad. With numerous injuries affecting the team, the Dragons endured a difficult start, losing six of their opening seven matches. However, the arrival of Australian international Greg Bird, who was subsequently appointed captain, had a significant impact on the squad. In the Challenge Cup, the Perpignan-based club defeated the Bradford Bulls 40–38 before being eliminated in the fifth round following a 42–8 defeat to St Helens. In Super League, the Dragons spent much of the season near the bottom of the table, fluctuating between tenth and twelfth place and appearing unlikely to qualify for the play-offs.

In June 2009, Casty took part in two high-profile matches. The first was an international friendly for France against England at the Stade Jean-Bouin in Paris on 13 June, which ended in a heavy 66–12 defeat for the French side. The second took place on 20 June, when the Catalans Dragons hosted the Warrington Wolves at the Montjuïc Olympic Stadium in Barcelona, marking the first Super League match to be staged in Spain. Despite the absence of Bird, who had returned to Australia to face legal proceedings, and a 24–12 defeat for the Catalans, the match attracted 18,150 spectators, setting a new home attendance record for the club. Between mid-July and mid-September, the Dragons mounted a late challenge for a play-off place. Their final regular-season match produced a notable 24–12 away victory over St Helens, securing eighth place in the standings. During the summer, Casty also extended his contract with the Catalans Dragons for another two seasons. In the play-offs, the Dragons first travelled to fifth-placed Wakefield Trinity Wildcats, winning 25–16. They then secured another impressive away victory, defeating fourth-placed Huddersfield Giants 16–6 to reach their first Super League semi-final. Facing the regular-season leaders, the Leeds Rhinos, the Catalans struggled in the first half and trailed 22–4 at the interval. They produced a much stronger performance after the break but ultimately lost 27–20, narrowly missing out on a place in the Grand Final.

At the end of 2009, Casty represented France in the 2009 Rugby League Four Nations, held in England. The tournament brought together three of the world's leading rugby league nations—New Zealand, Australia and England—alongside France, who participated as the fourth invited team. Casty started at prop in France's opening match against England, which ended in a 34–12 defeat. However, he suffered a serious hand fracture during the match, forcing him to withdraw from the remaining two fixtures. Without him, France suffered two further heavy defeats, losing 62–12 to New Zealand and 42–2 to Australia.

==== 2010: Establishment in the French national team and European Cup ====
Kevin Walters' second season in charge proved particularly difficult for the Catalans Dragons. The club remained near the bottom of the Super League table throughout the campaign, suffering 21 defeats in 27 matches and finishing last in the regular-season standings. For his part, Casty continued to be used primarily as an impact player from the interchange bench until round 19. However, an arm muscle injury sustained by regular starting prop David Ferriol gave him the opportunity to establish himself in the starting line-up towards the end of the season. He contributed to several notable victories against St Helens and Bradford Bulls, although these results were insufficient to prevent the Catalans from finishing bottom. In the Challenge Cup, however, Casty and the Dragons enjoyed a successful run to the semi-finals. Following victories over Salford, Crusaders and Batley, they were denied a place in the final after a 54–12 defeat to the Warrington Wolves. At the end of 2010, France competed in the European Cup, alongside Wales, Scotland and Ireland, with all the French team's matches played on home soil. The winner of the tournament would qualify for the 2011 Rugby League Four Nations. Casty was selected for a rejuvenated French squad. In the opening match against Ireland, he led by example by scoring France's first try and playing an important role in a 58–24 victory. France then defeated Scotland 26–12, setting up a decisive final encounter with Wales for the tournament title. In that match, France appeared to be heading towards victory after Tony Gigot kicked a drop goal in the 74th minute to give his side an 11–10 lead. The French game plan had largely relied on the power of the forward trio of Olivier Élima, Casty and Jamal Fakir. However, a late penalty awarded to Wales allowed the visitors to snatch a 12–11 victory and claim the European Cup. The defeat was a major disappointment for France, who consequently missed out on qualification for the 2011 Four Nations.

==== 2011: A new era under Trent Robinson ====
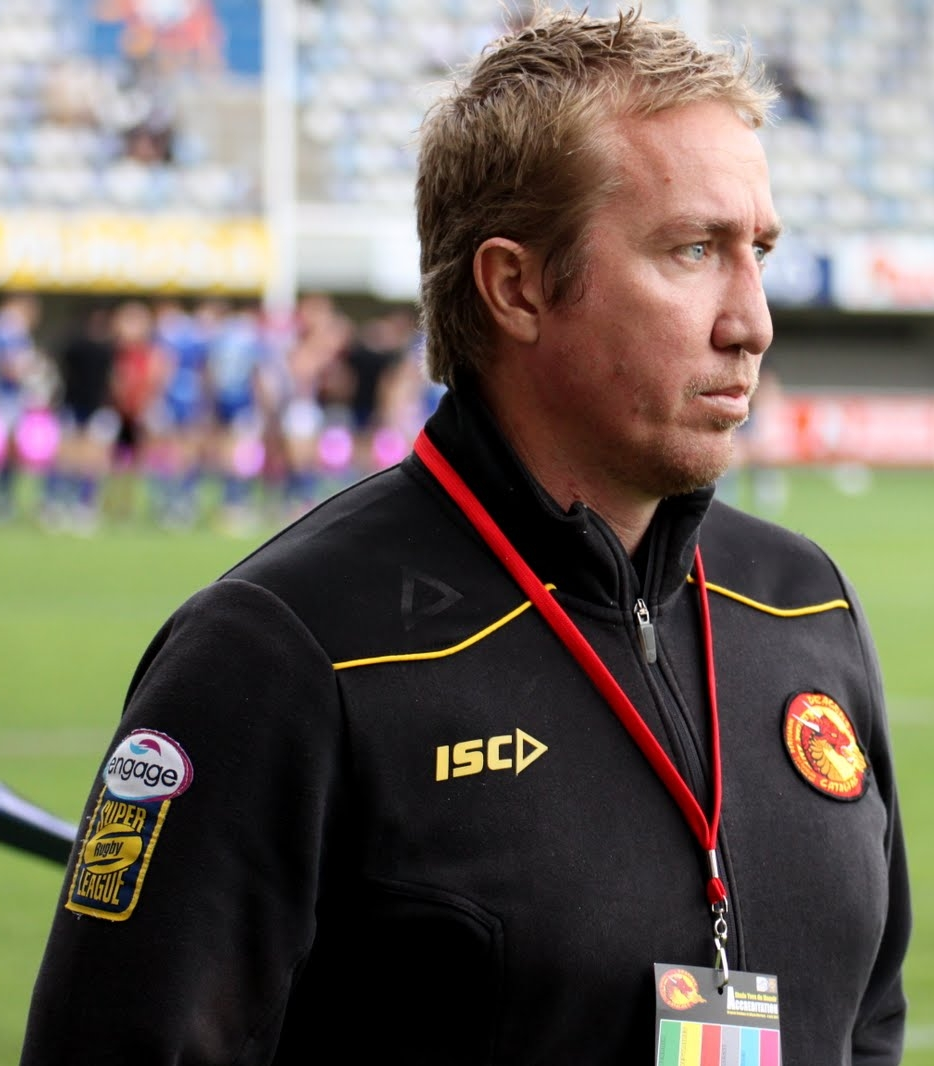
New Catalans Dragons head coach Trent Robinson helped Casty establish himself as a leading player and later recruited him to the Sydney Roosters in 2014.

In 2011, the Catalans Dragons decided not to renew the contract of head coach Kevin Walters, replacing him with Trent Robinson, who had previously played and coached in France with Toulouse Olympique. Robinson was assisted by recently retired former Dragons player Jérôme Guisset. The squad also underwent significant changes, with numerous departures offset by the arrivals of players including Steve Menzies, Scott Dureau and Jason Baitieri. During the season, Robinson introduced greater competition for places in the forwards, with Casty competing against David Ferriol, Jamal Fakir and Baitieri for the prop position. Casty appeared in 24 of the team's 29 matches, starting 20 of them. He also made several successful appearances in the second row, a position in which the club lacked depth. Grégory Mounis was appointed team captain. Following a difficult start, with five defeats in their opening seven matches, the Dragons began producing better results in April and spent much of the season competing for a play-off place, generally occupying positions between fifth and seventh. Casty became a regular first-team player, with his only significant absence resulting from a knee injury sustained between May and June, which kept him out for more than a month. The Catalans eventually finished sixth in the regular season and qualified for the play-offs, where they faced seventh-placed Hull Kingston Rovers. Playing in the second row, Casty helped the Dragons secure an emphatic 56–6 victory in front of approximately 8,500 spectators at the Stade Gilbert Brutus. One of the memorable moments of the match came in the 26th minute, when Casty produced a powerful carry that left Hull KR player Cox on the ground. In the second round, the Dragons travelled to face defending champions Wigan Warriors, who had finished second in the regular season. Wigan dominated the physical encounter and eliminated the French side with a comprehensive 44–0 victory.

At international level, the end of 2011 was marked by France's fixtures against Scotland and Ireland under head coach Bobbie Goulding, while Wales participated in the Four Nations. Before those matches, Casty featured in a friendly against England in Avignon. In front of 16,866 spectators, France produced an encouraging performance despite losing 32–18. France subsequently defeated Scotland 46–10 at the Stade Gilbert Brutus. Ahead of their final match of the year against Ireland, Casty learned that the international federation had named him France's rugby league player of the year. Playing in front of a sparse crowd in Ireland, France secured a 34–16 victory to win the three-team autumn tournament.

==== 2012: Captaincy and first Super League Dream Team selection ====
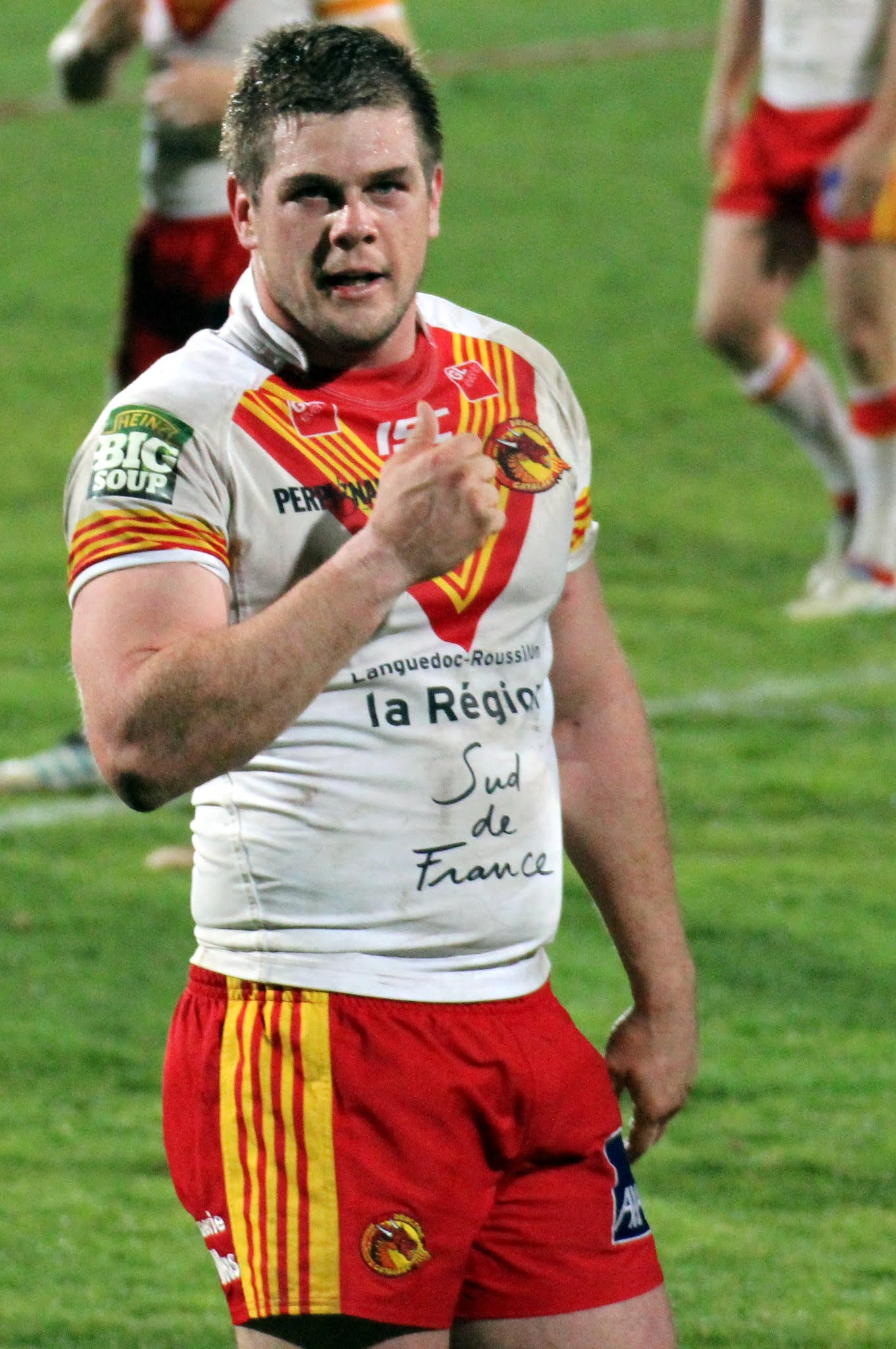
Rémi Casty playing for the Catalans Dragons.

Building on their 2011 campaign, the Catalans Dragons continued to improve during Trent Robinson's second season as head coach. With greater depth across the squad, the club challenged for a top-three finish from the beginning of the season. Notable victories over Bradford Bulls, St Helens and Hull Kingston Rovers demonstrated the team's consistency despite several injuries. Following an injury to regular captain Grégory Mounis at the beginning of the season, Robinson appointed Casty as captain. He retained the role throughout the campaign. Casty did not miss a single match during the season and was restored to his preferred position at prop, forming the front row alongside Lopini Paea, with Ian Henderson or Ben Fisher at hooker. He enjoyed the most prolific try-scoring season of his career, scoring nine tries in Super League. After spending much of the campaign challenging for a top-three finish, the Dragons eventually finished fourth in the regular-season standings, behind Wigan, Warrington and St Helens, securing their place in the play-offs. Before the play-offs began, a panel of 40 journalists selected the annual Super League Dream Team. Casty was named in the side alongside teammate Scott Dureau, becoming the first French player to receive the distinction. Casty learned of his selection from Robinson and thanked the coach for the confidence he had shown in him. He also paid tribute to Jérôme Guisset, whose advice and experience had helped him develop during the four years they had spent together. In the opening round of the play-offs, the Dragons faced regular-season leaders Wigan Warriors and suffered a heavy 46–6 defeat, with the English side dominating in all areas of the game. The Catalans were then given another opportunity to reach the semi-finals through a home play-off match against fifth-placed Leeds Rhinos. In a closely contested encounter, both teams exchanged the lead before Leeds stand-off Kevin Sinfield delivered a grubber kick into the Catalans' in-goal area, allowing Carl Ablett to score. Despite a late fightback in front of 11,523 spectators at the Stade Gilbert Brutus, the Dragons lost 26–20 to the eventual Super League champions.

At the end of 2012, with the 2013 Rugby League World Cup approaching and several matches scheduled to take place in France, the national team, now coached by Aurélien Cologni, played three international fixtures: one against Wales and two against England. The first match was held at the Stade Félix-Bollaert in Lens, where France sought to avenge their narrow 12–11 defeat to Wales in Albi in 2010. In front of 11,628 spectators in a region with little rugby league tradition, France defeated the Welsh side 20–6, providing encouraging preparation for their two matches against an England team coached by Steve McNamara in November. Despite their determination, the French suffered a heavy 44–6 defeat in the first encounter. Casty strongly criticised what he considered lenient refereeing towards the English side, describing the officiating as a "farce". The second match followed a similar pattern, with England winning 48–4. Although the French forwards held their own for periods of the encounter, France were significantly outmatched in the outside backs.

==== 2013: World Cup and departure for the National Rugby League ====
France squad for the 2013 Rugby League World Cup

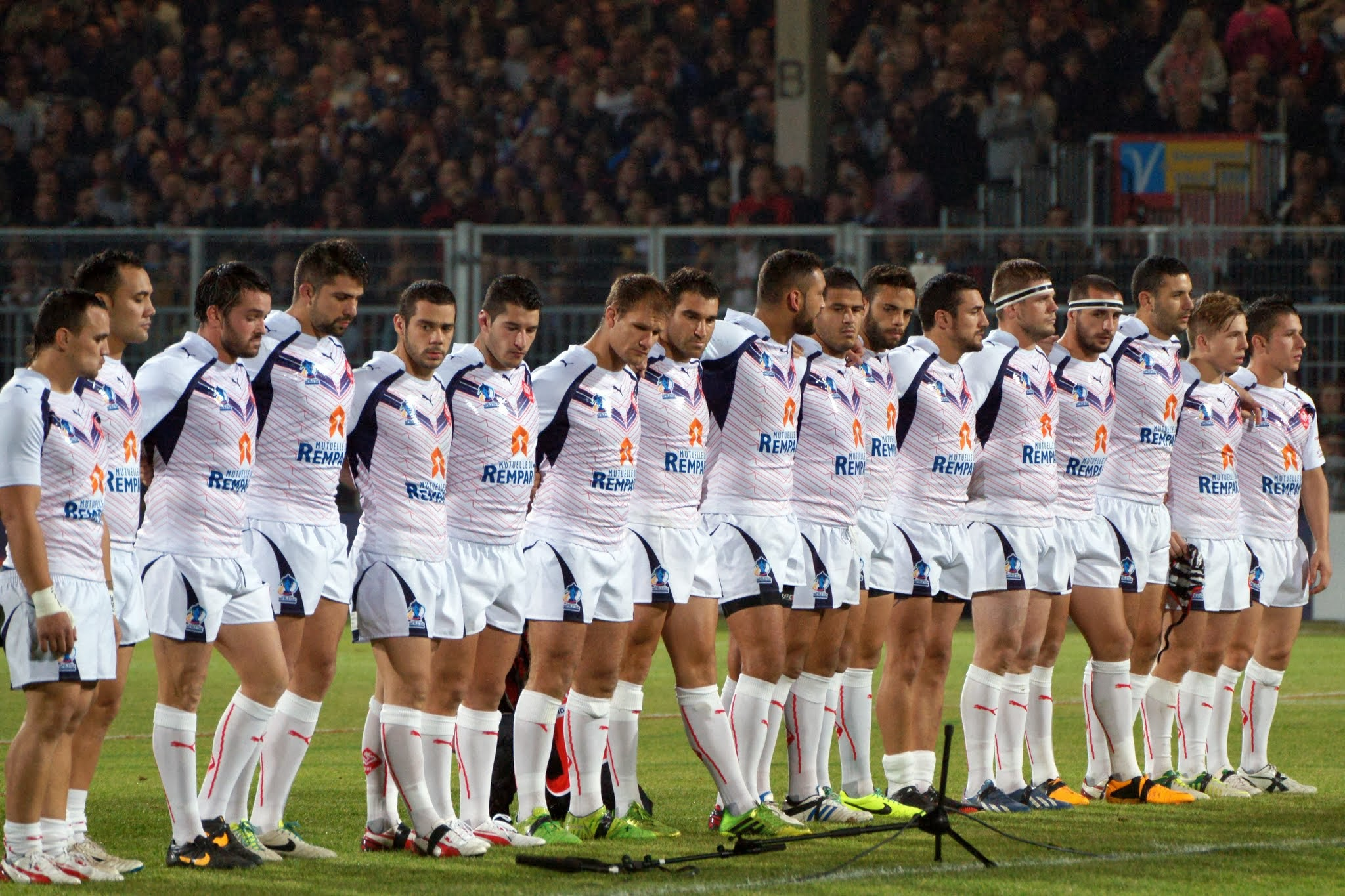

France 9–8 Papua New Guinea
France 0–48 New Zealand
France 6–22 Samoa
France 6–34 England

France squad
Jean-Philippe Baile, William Barthau, Andrew Bentley, Kane Bentley, Thomas Bosc, Damien Cardace, Rémi Casty, Vincent Duport, Morgan Escaré, Olivier Elima (c), Théo Fages, Jamal Fakir, Benjamin Garcia, Tony Gigot, Clint Greenshields, Younès Khattabi, Kevin Larroyer, Antoni Maria, Grégory Mounis, Eloi Pelissier, Sébastien Raguin, Mickaël Simon, Cyril Stacul, Frédéric Vaccari – Head coach: Richard Agar

The 2013 season brought significant changes to the Catalans Dragons. Head coach Trent Robinson left to join the Sydney Roosters, while influential half-back Scott Dureau was sidelined after being diagnosed with an eye tumour. For the first time in the club's history, a French head coach took charge of the Super League side, with former assistant Laurent Frayssinous succeeding Robinson. Despite these setbacks, the Catalans set themselves the objective of finishing among the top four teams in the regular season. Casty continued to share the captaincy with Grégory Mounis. The Dragons made an encouraging start to the campaign and occupied second place after nine rounds. However, their momentum was interrupted in April, when they lost four of five matches and dropped to fifth. The remainder of the season was marked by inconsistency and frustration. Although the club produced some respectable performances, these were offset by heavy defeats, and the Catalans eventually finished seventh in the regular-season standings. In June 2013, Casty announced that he had signed a two-year contract with the Sydney Roosters, where he would be reunited with Robinson. He was released from the final year of his contract with the Catalans following an agreement with club president Bernard Guasch. Casty described the move as the fulfilment of a childhood dream, explaining that playing in the National Rugby League was an extraordinary opportunity for any rugby league player. As captain, Casty also expressed concern about the team's attitude and performances during the season. He criticised certain displays as falling short of the club's values and called for a collective response if the Dragons were to achieve a satisfactory result. Having qualified for the play-offs, the Catalans faced Hull F.C. in the opening round. The match represented the final appearance in a Dragons shirt for both Steve Menzies, who was retiring, and Casty, who was preparing to leave for Australia. On 13 September 2013, the Dragons travelled to Hull hoping to overcome their hosts. The match attracted 4,970 spectators, among them former world heavyweight boxing champion Evander Holyfield. The Catalans failed to score a try and were defeated 14–4, reflecting the attacking difficulties they had experienced throughout the season. They had finished the regular season with only the twelfth-best attack among the fourteen Super League clubs. Their early elimination was a disappointing outcome given their initial ambition of securing a top-four finish. Casty ended the season with 29 appearances and three tries.

At the end of the year, Casty represented France at the 2013 Rugby League World Cup, hosted mainly in England, with two of France's three group-stage matches taking place on French soil. Selected by new national head coach Richard Agar, Casty was regarded as one of the leaders of the French squad. In their opening match, played in difficult weather conditions, France secured a narrow 9–8 victory over Papua New Guinea thanks to a drop goal from William Barthau, putting themselves in a favourable position to reach the quarter-finals. In their second match, despite a record crowd of nearly 20,000 in Avignon, France were overwhelmed by an outstanding New Zealand side, led by an influential performance from Shaun Johnson, and suffered a 48–0 defeat. France then lost their final group match 22–6 to Samoa in Perpignan. Having finished third in their group, France faced England in the quarter-finals at the DW Stadium in Wigan. Despite several promising spells of play, the French side struggled to convert their opportunities and were eliminated following a 34–6 defeat.

=== 2014: A year in Australia with the Sydney Roosters ===
2014 World Club Challenge victory
Sydney Roosters 36–14 Wigan Warriors

Sydney Roosters line-up
Anthony Minichiello (c) – Daniel Tupou, Michael Jennings, Mitchell Aubusson, Shaun Kenny-Dowall – James Maloney (SO), Mitchell Pearce (SH) – Jared Waerea-Hargreaves, Jake Friend, Sam Moa, Boyd Cordner, Sonny Bill Williams, Frank-Paul Nu'uausala – Daniel Mortimer, Aidan Guerra, Dylan Napa, Rémi Casty – Head coach: Trent Robinson

After eight seasons with the Catalans Dragons, Casty accepted an offer to join the Sydney Roosters in the National Rugby League (NRL) for the 2014 season. He was reunited with former Catalans head coach Trent Robinson, now in charge of the Australian club, and played alongside established NRL stars including Sonny Bill Williams, Anthony Minichiello, Roger Tuivasa-Sheck and James Maloney. Casty described the move as the culmination of his career and the fulfilment of a childhood dream. After eight years with the Dragons, he expressed his pride in having represented the French club and thanked its management for allowing him to pursue an opportunity in the NRL. He also stated that the Catalans would be the first club he would contact if he ever decided to return to Super League.

Rémi Casty's NRL debut
Canterbury-Bankstown Bulldogs 12–32 Sydney Roosters

Sydney Roosters line-up
Anthony Minichiello (c) – Nene Macdonald, Mitchell Aubusson, Shaun Kenny-Dowall, Roger Tuivasa-Sheck – James Maloney (SO), Mitchell Pearce (SH) – Jared Waerea-Hargreaves, Jake Friend, Sam Moa, Dylan Napa, Sonny Bill Williams, Frank-Paul Nu'uausala – Samisoni Langi, Isaac Liu, Kane Evans, Rémi Casty – Head coach: Trent Robinson

At the beginning of the season, Casty was part of the Roosters squad that won the 2014 World Club Challenge, defeating the Wigan Warriors 36–14. He made his NRL debut in round 11 against the league-leading Canterbury-Bankstown Bulldogs, as the Roosters recorded a 32–12 victory. He retained his place for the following match against the Canberra Raiders, which Sydney won 26–12. In his third NRL appearance, against the Melbourne Storm, Casty became the first French player to score a try in the competition. He scored his second try of the season during a victory over the Penrith Panthers in round 19. The Roosters qualified for the finals series, in which Casty made two appearances, becoming the first French player to participate in the NRL play-offs. After suffering a narrow 19–18 defeat against Penrith, Sydney defeated the North Queensland Cowboys 31–30 before facing the South Sydney Rabbitohs in the preliminary final. Casty was not selected for that final encounter, which the Roosters lost, bringing their season to an end. He finished his first NRL season with eleven appearances and two tries.

Following his season in Australia, Casty received an offer of a four-year contract from the Catalans Dragons. With the agreement of the Sydney Roosters, he decided to terminate his existing two-year contract and return to France. He acknowledged that leaving the Roosters had been a difficult decision, but explained that the Catalans' proposal and the opportunity to return to a club with major ambitions were too attractive to refuse. Having fulfilled his dream of playing in the NRL, he now hoped to achieve another ambition by winning a major trophy with the Dragons.

=== 2015–2020: Return to the Catalans Dragons ===
==== 2015–2017: Struggle for survival and the arrival of McNamara ====
After a year in the NRL, Rémi Casty returned to the Catalans Dragons in 2015. Reappointed captain, he provided continuity and experience within a rejuvenated squad coached by Laurent Frayssinous. The season began encouragingly, with victories over Warrington, Hull KR and Huddersfield. However, the Dragons experienced a decline in form during the summer and finished eighth in the regular season. Eliminated in the quarter-finals of the Challenge Cup, they also failed to make a significant impact in Super League, finishing seventh in the Super 8s and leaving their captain with a sense of unfinished business.

In 2016, Casty retained the captaincy as the Catalans established themselves in the middle of the Super League table. His physical presence in the forwards and consistent performances made him one of the competition's most dependable props. Despite qualifying for the Super 8s, the Dragons were unable to establish themselves among the title contenders, eventually finishing sixth. On an individual level, Casty passed the milestone of 200 Super League appearances and remained a key figure in the French national team. He notably featured in a Test match against England.

The 2017 season proved particularly difficult for the Dragons. Despite the presence of experienced players such as Casty, the team suffered a succession of disappointing results and slipped towards the bottom of the table. Following a series of defeats in the spring, head coach Laurent Frayssinous was dismissed in June and replaced by Englishman Steve McNamara, the former England national team coach. Casty attempted to maintain the unity of a squad experiencing a difficult campaign. However, he suffered a fractured hand which ruled him out for several weeks, including the most critical period of the season. The Dragons finished thirteenth in the regular-season standings and were forced to compete in The Qualifiers, a relegation competition involving clubs from Super League and the Championship.

On 30 September 2017, the Catalans faced the Leigh Centurions in England in the decisive Million Pound Game, with their Super League status at stake. Casty, still recovering from his injury, was unable to participate. Nevertheless, his teammates secured a 26–10 victory in a tense encounter, ensuring the club's survival in Super League. Although Casty was absent from the field, his leadership during the preceding weeks had remained important to the squad. After the match, Steve McNamara acknowledged the emotional significance of the victory, describing the atmosphere in the dressing room and praising his team's performance under extreme pressure. The victory was widely regarded as one of the most important matches in the club's history, preventing a relegation that could have threatened its long-term Super League project. At the end of the season, Casty was also forced to withdraw from the 2017 Rugby League World Cup in Australia because of his hand injury.

==== 2018: Historic triumph at Wembley ====
2018 Challenge Cup victory

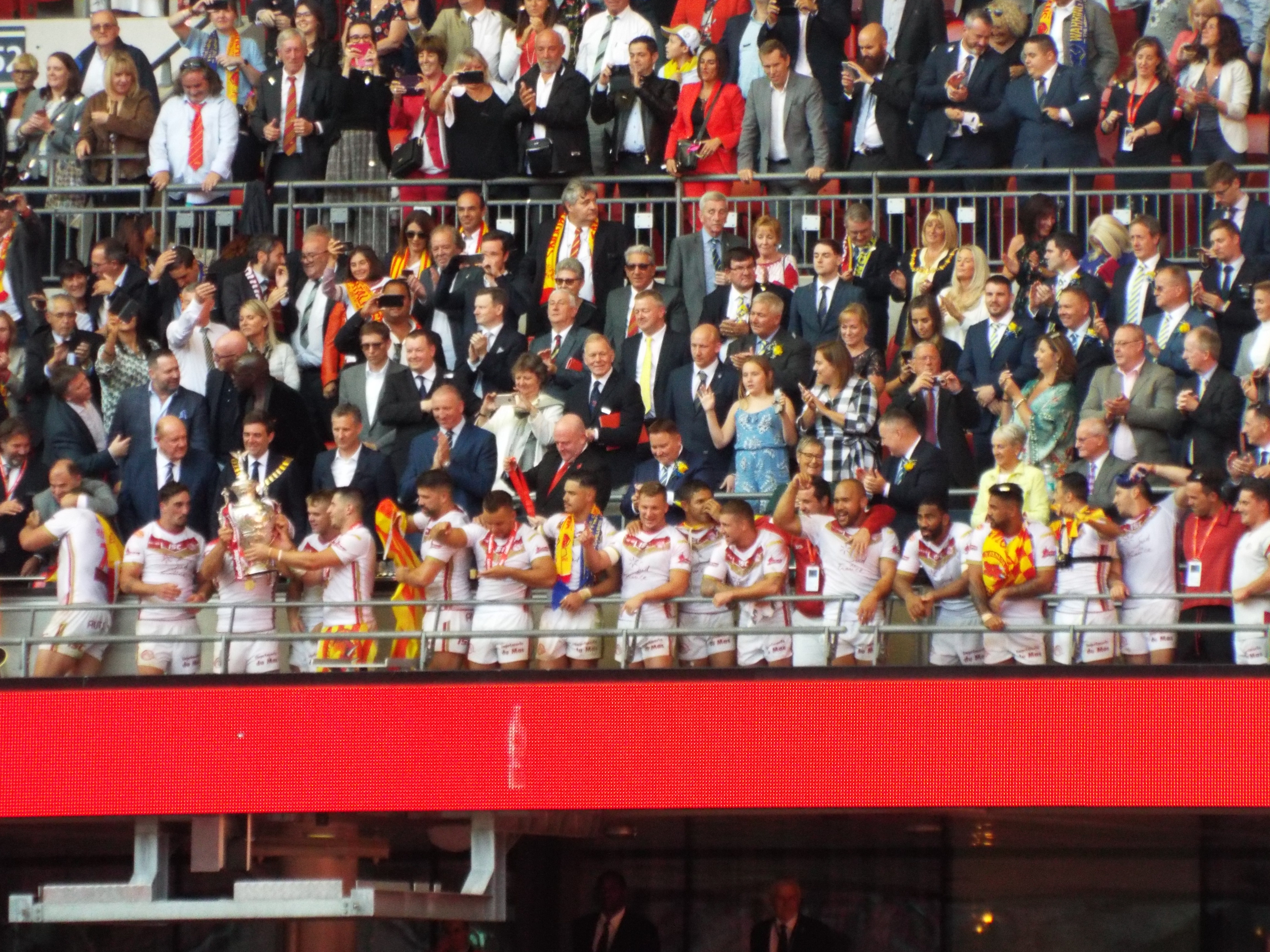

Catalans Dragons 20–14 Warrington Wolves

Catalans Dragons line-up
Tony Gigot – Lewis Tierney, David Mead, Brayden Wiliame, Fouad Yaha – Josh Drinkwater, Samisoni Langi – Sam Moa, Michael McIlorum, Mickaël Simon, Benjamin Jullien, Benjamin Garcia, Rémi Casty (c) – Julian Bousquet, Jason Baitieri, Kenny Edwards, Mickaël Goudemand – Head coach: Steve McNamara

The 2018 season began with the Catalans Dragons still struggling to overcome the difficulties of the previous campaign. Under head coach Steve McNamara, the club opened its Super League season with four consecutive defeats, leaving the team near the bottom of the table. Despite the experience of senior players such as Rémi Casty, confidence remained low and criticism of the team's performances increased. As captain, Casty urged his teammates to respond, warning against passivity in a competition as demanding as Super League. A turning point came during the spring with the arrival of half-back Josh Drinkwater, whose attacking influence helped revitalise the Catalans' performances. Restored to the starting line-up at prop, Casty regained his influence in the team's defensive organisation, while his leadership proved crucial in helping the Dragons recover. A succession of victories enabled the club to move away from the bottom of the Super League standings while continuing its progress in the Challenge Cup.

In the quarter-finals and semi-finals, Casty led a dominant Catalans forward pack as the team eliminated Huddersfield Giants and then tournament favourites St Helens. On 25 August 2018, the Dragons faced the Warrington Wolves at Wembley Stadium in front of more than 50,000 spectators, including several thousand supporters who had travelled from Perpignan. Starting at loose forward and captaining the side, Casty produced an outstanding defensive performance in a fiercely contested match. Following the Dragons' 20–14 victory, he lifted the trophy, becoming the first French captain to win the Challenge Cup with a French club.

The historic achievement, the first major trophy won by a French club competing in Super League, represented one of the defining moments of Casty's career. His consistency and leadership were further recognised when he was selected for the Super League Dream Team for the second time, following his previous inclusion in 2012. By this stage of his career, Casty was regarded by many observers as one of the leading figures of French rugby league in England.

==== 2019–2020: Final years in Super League ====
Following their Wembley triumph in 2018, the Catalans Dragons entered the 2019 season with considerable ambitions. Casty retained the captaincy and remained a central figure in the forward pack alongside Julian Bousquet and Benjamin Garcia. The club produced several notable performances, including prestigious victories over the Wigan Warriors and league leaders St Helens. However, the Catalans struggled to maintain consistency, alternating impressive victories with disappointing defeats, particularly away from home. An established member of the starting side, Casty made 26 appearances and scored one try during the season. Despite his experience, he was unable to prevent another disappointing conclusion to the campaign, as the Dragons finished seventh in the regular season and missed out on a place in the semi-finals. Their Challenge Cup campaign also ended in the quarter-finals. On an individual level, Casty continued to provide leadership and experience to the team. He passed the milestone of 300 appearances for the Catalans Dragons, confirming his status as the club's record appearance holder.

The 2020 season was heavily disrupted by the COVID-19 pandemic. Super League was suspended for several months before resuming behind closed doors under a shortened format. Despite these unprecedented circumstances, the Dragons remained competitive, with Casty continuing as captain and playing an important role in the forward rotation. The team reached the Super League semi-finals after defeating the Leeds Rhinos 26–14 in the quarter-finals. However, the Catalans suffered a heavy 48–2 defeat against St Helens in the semi-final. At the age of 35, Casty made what proved to be his final appearance for the Dragons in that match. In the autumn, Casty publicly expressed his desire to extend his playing career with the Catalans for another season, with the aim of participating in the 2021 Rugby League World Cup, which was then scheduled to take place in England. He hoped to conclude his international career with one final World Cup campaign. However, a few days later, the club's management informed him that his contract would not be renewed. The decision surprised and disappointed many observers, given Casty's close association with the club over more than fifteen years. Speaking to the local press, Casty described the announcement as a sudden and unexpected decision, explaining that he had anticipated being offered a contract extension, potentially with a reduced salary. Casty's long association with the Catalans Dragons therefore came to an end in disappointing circumstances. Having made more than 330 appearances, he remained the club's record appearance holder and the only French captain to have lifted the Challenge Cup.

=== 2021: Final season with Toulouse Olympique ===
2021 Championship victory
Toulouse Olympique 34–12 Featherstone Rovers

Toulouse Olympique line-up
Mark Kheirallah – Jy Hitchcox, Mathieu Jussaume, Taioalo Vaivai, Latrell Schaumkel – Tony Gigot (SO), Johnathon Ford (SH, c) – Rémi Casty, Lloyd White, Harrison Hansen, Dominique Peyroux, Joe Bretherton, Anthony Marion – Éloi Pélissier, Mitchell Garbutt, Justin Sangaré, Joseph Paulo – Head coach: Sylvain Houlès

After being released by the Catalans Dragons on 1 December 2020, Rémi Casty considered several offers, mainly from Super League clubs, including the Leeds Rhinos and Warrington Wolves. However, Toulouse Olympique, the other French club competing in the English rugby league system and seeking promotion to Super League, took advantage of the situation and offered Casty the opportunity to bring his experience to the team. On 21 January 2021, he signed a one-year contract with the Toulouse club, expressing his belief in the club's ambition to gain promotion to Super League.

During a Championship season in which Toulouse were required to play numerous matches in England without being able to host many visiting teams, the club remained unbeaten throughout the regular season, winning all fourteen of its matches. In July 2021, Casty announced that he would retire from professional rugby league at the end of the season, expressing his determination to finish his playing career by winning the Championship title.

Having finished top of the Championship regular-season standings, Toulouse hosted their play-off matches at the Stade Ernest-Wallon. They defeated the Batley Bulldogs 51–12 in the semi-finals, setting up a final against Featherstone Rovers, who had finished second in the regular season. Featherstone had suffered only one defeat during the campaign, a 23–6 loss to Toulouse. Ahead of the final, Toulouse head coach Sylvain Houlès declared that his team wanted to win the title for Casty.

In front of a crowd of nearly 10,000 spectators at the Stade Ernest-Wallon, Toulouse maintained their unbeaten record by defeating Featherstone 34–12 in the final. The victory secured promotion to Super League, where Toulouse would join the Catalans Dragons, who had themselves reached the Super League Grand Final that season. For the first time, two French clubs would compete in Super League in 2022. Casty thus ended his playing career with another major honour, having scored five tries in thirteen appearances during his final season.

Two weeks later, having retired as a player, Casty announced that he would remain in Toulouse and join the club's coaching staff.

=== Coaching career ===
Following his retirement from professional rugby league, Casty moved into coaching. He remained with Toulouse Olympique, joining the coaching staff of Sylvain Houlès for the 2022 season, the club's first campaign in Super League. Despite several encouraging performances, Toulouse finished bottom of the Super League standings and were relegated to the Championship.

Following that season, Casty was appointed head coach of the France under-19 national rugby league team in March 2023. At the same time, he returned to the Catalans Dragons organisation in July 2023, becoming assistant coach to Justin Murphy at Saint-Estève XIII Catalan, the club's reserve team competing in the French Championship.

For the 2024–25 season, Casty became joint head coach of Saint-Estève XIII Catalan alongside Murphy. The young Catalans squad finished third in the regular-season standings and won the 2025 French Cup, defeating Albi 26–18 in the final. For the 2025–26 season, Casty took sole charge of Saint-Estève XIII Catalan, assisted by a coaching staff that included Thomas Valette. Despite fielding a very young squad, the Catalans qualified for the play-offs of the Super XIII, finishing sixth in the regular season before being eliminated by XIII Limouxin in the quarter-finals. Casty also joined the coaching staff of the senior French national team, working alongside Laurent Frayssinous and Maxime Grésèque during the qualification campaign for the 2026 Rugby League World Cup.

At the end of the 2025–26 season, Casty left Saint-Estève XIII Catalan to return to FC Lézignan, the club where he had developed as a young player. He was appointed head coach for the 2026–27 season, with Thomas Valette, who had previously served as his assistant at Saint-Estève, joining him on the coaching staff.

== Honours ==
=== As a player ===
- Team
  - World Club Challenge winner: 2014 (Sydney Roosters).
  - Challenge Cup winner: 2018 (Catalans Dragons).
  - Championship winner: 2021 (Toulouse Olympique).
  - European Cup runner-up: 2010 (France).
  - Challenge Cup runner-up: 2007 (Catalans Dragons).
- Individual
  - Super League Dream Team: 2012 and 2018 (Catalans Dragons).

==== Rugby League World Cup ====
Rémi Casty's Rugby League World Cup record
Edition	Finish	France record	Casty's record	Casty's appearances
Australia 2008	10th	1 W, 0 D, 2 L	1 W, 0 D, 1 L	2/3
England 2013	Quarter-finals	1 W, 0 D, 3 L	1 W, 0 D, 3 L	4/4

Key: W = win; D = draw; L = loss.

==== European Cup ====
Rémi Casty's European Cup record
Edition	Finish	France record	Casty's record	Casty's appearances
2010	Runner-up	2 W, 0 D, 1 L	2 W, 0 D, 1 L	3/3

==== International appearances ====
Rémi Casty's international appearances for France
No.	Date	Opponent	Result	Competition	Position	Points	Tries	Goals	Field goals
1	2 October 2004	Morocco	46–6	Mediterranean Cup	Prop	-	-	-	-
2	5 October 2004	Serbia	18–4 (Note: On 5 October 2004, Rémi Casty represented France A against Serbia and Montenegro in the Mediterranean Cup in Tripoli, Lebanon. Starting as a prop (number 10), he scored a try before the match was abandoned in the 25th minute due to a floodlight failure, with France leading 18–4. The result was subsequently allowed to stand.)	Mediterranean Cup	Prop	4	1	-	-
3	3 November 2007	Papua New Guinea	38–26	Test match	Prop	-	-	-	-
4	10 November 2007	Papua New Guinea	22–16	Test match	Interchange	-	-	-	-
5	17 November 2007	New Zealand	14–22	Test match	Interchange	-	-	-	-
6	27 June 2008	England	8–56	Test match	Interchange	-	-	-	-
7	26 October 2008	Scotland	36–18	World Cup	Interchange	-	-	-	-
8	1 November 2008	Fiji	6–42	World Cup	Interchange	-	-	-	-
9	13 June 2009	England	12–66	Test match	Prop	-	-	-	-
10	23 October 2009	England	12–34	Four Nations	Prop	-	-	-	-
11	12 June 2010	England	6–60	Test match	Prop	-	-	-	-
12	9 October 2010	(Republic of Ireland) Ireland	58–24	European Cup	Prop	4	1	-	-
13	16 October 2010	Scotland	26–12	European Cup	Prop	-	-	-	-
14	23 October 2010	Wales	11–12	European Cup	Prop	-	-	-	-
15	21 October 2011	England	18–32	Test match	Prop	-	-	-	-
16	29 October 2011	Scotland	46–10	Test match	Prop	-	-	-	-
17	5 November 2011	(Republic of Ireland) Ireland	34–16	Test match	Prop	-	-	-	-
18	20 October 2012	Wales	20–6	Test match	Prop	-	-	-	-
19	3 November 2012	England	6–44	Test match	Prop	-	-	-	-
20	11 November 2012	England	4–48	Test match	Prop	-	-	-	-
21	27 October 2013	Papua New Guinea	9–8	World Cup	Prop	-	-	-	-
22	1 November 2013	New Zealand	0–48	World Cup	Prop	-	-	-	-
23	11 November 2013	Samoa	6–22	World Cup	Prop	-	-	-	-
24	16 November 2013	England	6–34	World Cup	Prop	-	-	-	-
25	22 October 2016	England	6–40	Test match	Prop	-	-	-	-

==== Club career statistics ====
Rémi Casty's career statistics
Season	Club	League					Cup		International		
Season	Club	Competition	Finish	Apps	Pts	Tries	Competition	Finish	Competition	Apps	Pts
2003–04	(France) FC Lézignan	French Championship	8th				French Cup	Quarter-finals			
2004–05	(France) FC Lézignan	French Championship	9th				French Cup	Quarter-finals	Mediterranean Cup	2	4
2005–06	(France) Union Treiziste Catalane	French Championship	Semi-finals				French Cup	Quarter-finals			
2006	(France) Catalans Dragons	Super League	12th	7	-	-	Challenge Cup	Quarter-finals			
2007	(France) Catalans Dragons	Super League	10th	10	4	1	Challenge Cup	Runner-up		3	-
2008	(France) Catalans Dragons	Super League	Play-offs, round 2	26	8	2	Challenge Cup	Fifth round	World Cup	3	-
2009	(France) Catalans Dragons	Super League	Semi-finals	28	4	1	Challenge Cup	Fifth round	Four Nations	2	-
2010	(France) Catalans Dragons	Super League	14th	21	8	2	Challenge Cup	Semi-finals	European Cup	4	4
2011	(France) Catalans Dragons	Super League	Play-offs, round 2	24	4	1	Challenge Cup	Fifth round		3	-
2012	(France) Catalans Dragons	Super League	Play-offs, round 2	29	36	9	Challenge Cup	Quarter-finals		3	-
2013	(France) Catalans Dragons	Super League	Play-offs, round 1	26	8	2	Challenge Cup	Quarter-finals	World Cup	4	-
2014	(Australia) Sydney Roosters	National Rugby League	Preliminary finals	11	8	2	World Club Challenge	Winners			
2015	(France) Catalans Dragons	Super League	7th	19	8	2	Challenge Cup	Quarter-finals			
2016	(France) Catalans Dragons	Super League	6th	25	4	1	Challenge Cup	Quarter-finals		1	-
2017	(France) Catalans Dragons	Super League	13th	27	8	2	Challenge Cup	Fifth round			
2018	(France) Catalans Dragons	Super League	7th	26	12	3	Challenge Cup	Winners			
2019	(France) Catalans Dragons	Super League	7th	26	4	1	Challenge Cup	Quarter-finals			
2020	(France) Catalans Dragons	Super League	Semi-finals	15	-	-	Challenge Cup	Quarter-finals			
2021	(France) Toulouse Olympique	Championship	Winners	13	20	5					

=== As a coach ===
- Team
  - French Cup winner: 2025 (Saint-Estève XIII Catalan).

==== Coaching career statistics ====
Rémi Casty's coaching record
Season	Club	Competition	Regular season					Play-offs				French Cup
Season	Club	Competition	Position	P	W	D	L	Finish	P	W	L	French Cup
2024–25	(France) Saint-Estève XIII Catalan	Super XIII	3rd	20	13	0	7	First round	1	0	1	Winners
2025–26	(France) Saint-Estève XIII Catalan	Super XIII	6th	20	8	1	11	First round	1	0	1	Quarter-finals
2026–27	(France) FC Lézignan	Super XIII	–					–				

Key: P = played; W = wins; D = draws; L = losses.
