= Lord Derby Cup 2024–2025 =

French rugby league football competition

2024–25 Lord Derby French Cup
- Duration: 20 October 2024 – 5 April 2025
- Number of teams: 20
- Broadcast partners: Youtube
- Winners: Saint-Estève XIII Catalan
- Runners-up: Albi RL XIII

The 2024–25 Coupe de France Lord Derby was the 84th edition of the Coupe de France Lord Derby, the premier rugby league knockout competition in France. It began over the weekend of 19–20 October 2024 and ended with the final at the Parc des Sports et de l'Amitié, Narbonne, on 5 April 2025.

The defending champions were AS Carcassonne who defeated FC Lézignan XIII in the 2023–24 final to win the cup for a third consecutive time. In the 2024–25 final, Saint-Estève XIII Catalan defeated Albi RL XIII 26–18 to reclaim the trophy they had last won in the 2017–18 season.

== Background ==
The 84th edition of the Coupe de France Lord Derby, started on 19 October 2024 and concluded with the final on 5 April 2025. Entry was limited to teams in the top two divisions: Super XIII (11 teams) and Elite 2 (9 teams). Eight of the teams from Elite 2 took part in a play-off round with the four winners advancing to the round of 16 where they were joined by the remaining teams who entered the competition at this stage: Palau Broncos, who received a bye in the first round, and the Super XIII teams.

=== Format and dates ===
Lord Derby French Cup competition format
Round	Date	Clubs involved this round	Winners from previous round	New entries this round	Leagues entering at this round
Play-off round	19–20 October	8	None	8	8 teams from Elite 2
Round of 16	4–5 January	16	4	12	1 team from Elite 2 and all 11 teams from Super XIII
Quarter-finals	8–9 February	8	8	None	
Semi-finals	22–23 March	4	4	None	
Final	5 April	2	2	None	

== Play-off round ==
The draws for the play-off round and the round of 16 were made on 12 September. Ties were played over the weekend of 19–20 October.

Play-off round fixtures
Home	Score	Away	Match Information			
Home	Score	Away	Date and Time	Venue	Referee	Report
Pamiers XIII	24–42	Ille-sur-Têt XIII	19 October	Stade Magnagounet		
RC Carpentras XIII	60–12	Realmont XIII	20 October	Stade de la Roseraie		
Lescure-Arthes	32–36	Tonneins XIII	20 October	Stade de Lescure d'Albigeois		
RC Salon XIII	0–58	Villegailhenc-Aragon XIII	20 October	Stade Marcel Roustan		

== Round of 16 ==
Ties were played over the weekend of 4–5 January.

Round of 16 fixtures
Home	Score	Away	Match Information			
Home	Score	Away	Date and Time	Venue	Referee	Report
SO Avignon	18–54	Saint-Estève XIII Catalan	4 January, 16:00	Parc Des Sports		Report
Villeneuve XIII RLLG	16–14	Baroudeurs de Pia XIII	4 January, 16:00	Stade De Choisy		Report
RC Carpentras XIII	60–16	Tonneins XIII	5 January, 15:00	Stade De La Roseraie		
Palau XIII Broncos	16–30	Albi RL XIII	5 January, 15:00	Stade Georges Vaills		Report
Villegailhenc-Aragon XIII	27–12	Villefranche XIII Aveyron	5 January, 15:00	Stade Jerome Rieu		
Saint-Gaudens Bears	6–50	AS Carcassonne	5 January, 15:00	Stade Jules Ribet		
FC Lézignan XIII	8–20	XIII Limouxin	5 January, 15:00	Stade Du Moulin		Report
Ille-sur-Têt XIII	14–32	Toulouse Olympique Broncos	5 January, 15:00	Stade Jean Galia		

== Quarter-finals ==
The draw for the quarter-finals was made on 10 January. Ties were played on the weekend of 8–9 February.

Quarter-final fixtures
Home	Score	Away	Match Information			
Home	Score	Away	Date and Time	Venue	Referee	Report
RC Carpentras XIII	10–40	Albi RL XIII	8 February, 15:00	Stade de la Roseraie		
AS Carcassonne	29–16	XIII Limouxin	8 February, 16:00	Stade Albert Domec		Report
Villeneuve XIII RLLG	10–14	Saint-Estève XIII Catalan	8 February, 15:30	Stade De Choisy	Stéphane Vincent	Report
Villegailhenc-Aragon XIII	8–18	Toulouse Olympique Broncos	9 February, 15:30	Stade Jerome Rieu		

== Semi-finals ==
The draw for the semi-finals was made on 14 February. Ties were played on the weekend of 22–23 March at neutral venues.

Semi-final fixtures
Home	Score	Away	Match Information			
Home	Score	Away	Date and Time	Venue	Referee	Report
Albi RL XIII	34–30	AS Carcassonne	22 March, 15:00	Stade Ernest Wallon, Toulouse		Report
Saint-Estève XIII Catalan	16–0	Toulouse Olympique Broncos	23 March, 16:00	Stade du Moulin, Lézignan		Report

== Final ==
The final of the 2024–25 Coupe de France Lord Derby was originally scheduled to take place on the weekend of 3–4 May. However, in March 2025 it was announced that it would be played on 5 April at the Parc des Sports et de l'Amitié preceded by the final of the Luc Nitard Cup (under-19s).

Saint-Estève XIII Catalan had last won the cup in the 2017–18 competition and then reached the final again the following season. Their opponents, Albi, had previously won the cup once, in the 1973–74 season, and last reached the final in the 2022–23 season. In the 2024–25 final, Saint-Estève XIII Catalan led 16–10 at half time, Albi then levelled the score, and took the lead with around 30 minutes to play, before two tries from Saint-Estève XIII Catalan saw them take the trophy with a 26–18 win. The attendance for the final was 4,488. Before the Lord Derby match, Toulouse Olympique won their third consecutive Luc Nitard cup with a 48–36 win over Saint-Estève XIII Catalan.

Final
Home	Score	Away	Match Information			
Home	Score	Away	Date and Time	Venue	Referee	Report
Albi RL XIII	18–26	Saint-Estève XIII Catalan	5 April, 18:00	Parc des Sports et de l'Amitié, Narbonne	Geoffrey Poumes	Report

=== Teams ===
Albi RL XIII: Romain Franco, Nittim Pedrero, Hnaloan Budden, Adrien Salies, Théo Guinguet, Brad Wall, Tony Gigot, Benjamin Shea, Mathieu Liauzun, Chase Bernard, Corentin Le Cam, Jayson Goffin, Mickael Goudemand
Interchanges: Clément Tailhades, Maxime Puech, Louis Tailhades, Tristan Dupuy, Maxime Rostang, Théo Lardot
Coaches: Joris Canton and Fabien Denis

Saint-Estève XIII Catalan: Tanguy Zenon, Léo Darrelatour, Clément Martin, Lenny Marc, Corentin Rey, Bruno Castany, Caesar Red, Franck Maria, Yacine Ben Abdeslem, Florian Vailhen, Lucas Tignol, Loan Castano, Thibaud Margalet
Interchanges: Giovanni Descalzi Ganthier, Robin Hugues, Renaud Lapierre, Valentin Fernandez, Rayan Tadjeur, Léo Llong
Coaches: Justin Murphy and Rémi Casty
