= Clément Martin =

French professional rugby league footballer

Clement Martin

Personal information
- Full name: Clément Martin
- Born: 14 January 2005 (age 21) France
- Height: 6 ft 2 in (1.88 m)
- Weight: 13 st 12 lb (88 kg)

Playing information
- Position: Centre, Wing
Club
Years	Team	Pld	T	G	FG	P
2023–24	Lézignan	11	6	0	0	24
2025–	Catalans Dragons	10	1	0	0	4
2025(loan)	→ Saint-Estève	14	2	0	0	8
	Total	35	9	0	0	36
Representative
Years	Team	Pld	T	G	FG	P
2024–	France	1	1	0	0	4
- Source: As of 22 October 2026

Clément Martin (born 14 January 2005) is a French professional rugby league footballer who plays as a winger and centre for the Catalans Dragons in the Super League and France at international level.

He previously played for Lézignan in the French Super XIII competition.

== Background ==
Martin was born in France. He is the son of Stéphane Martin who played for the Lézignan Sangliers club in the 1990s.

He played his junior rugby league with the FC Lézignan youth academy academy.

== Career ==
=== Domestic ===
Martin played for Lézignan in the Elite One Championship 2023–2024 season. He reached the Lord Derby Cup Final in 2024, but was defeated by AS Carcassonne.

After a breakout season, the teenage back was sought after by rugby league clubs in England and Australia, as well as multiple French rugby union clubs.

He signed for rugby union club Montpellier Hérault Rugby, but was released from the contract in order to take up a two-and-a-half year contract with the Catalans Dragons ahead of their 2025 Super League season.

Martin spent time at Saint-Estève XIII Catalan, the feeder club of the Dragons. He won the Lord Derby Cup in 2025 with Saint-Estève

He made his Betfred Super League debut for the Catalans Dragons in May 2025 against the Wigan Warriors at the Stade Gilbert Brutus.

=== International ===
Martin played for the French under-19 team in their summer tour of 2024.

He was selected by Laurent Frayssinous for the 2026 World Cup qualifiers and made his debut on October 22 2024 against Ukraine at the Stade Albert Domec in Carcassonne in a 74–8 victory.

In September 2026 Martin was included in an extended squad of forty players preparing for the 2026 World Cup. He did not make the final squad for the 2026 Rugby League World Cup.
