= Alexis Lis =

French professional rugby league footballer

Personal information
- Full name: Alexis Lis
- Born: 5 October 2005 (age 21) France
- Height: 6 ft 2 in (1.88 m)
- Weight: 15 st 2 lb (96 kg)

Playing information
- Position: Prop, Second-row
Club
| Years | Team | Pld | T | G | FG | P |
|---|---|---|---|---|---|---|
| 2023–24 | RC Carpentras | 4 | 0 | 0 | 0 | 0 |
| 2024–25 | SO Avignon | 11 | 0 | 0 | 0 | 0 |
| 2025–26 | Saint-Estève | 9 | 7 | 0 | 0 | 28 |
| 2026– | Catalans Dragons | 15 | 2 | 0 | 0 | 8 |
| | Total | 39 | 9 | 0 | 0 | 36 |
Representative
| Years | Team | Pld | T | G | FG | P |
| 2025– | France | 1 | 1 | 0 | 0 | 4 |
- Source: As of 26 October 2026

Alexis Lis (born 5 October 2005) is a French professional rugby league footballer who plays as a prop or second-row forward for the Catalans Dragons in the Super League and France at international level.

He previously played for RC Carpentras in the French Elite Two Championship, Sporting Olympique Avignon in the Super XIII competition, and he has spent time on loan from the Catalans Dragons at their feeder club Saint-Estève in the Super XIII competition.

== Background ==
Lis was born in France. He played his junior rugby league with Grans XIII, before moving onto Saint-Martin and RC Salon.

== Career ==
=== Domestic ===
Lis played for RC Carpentras in the 2023-24 Elite Two Championship season.

He moved to Sporting Olympique Avignon for the 2024–2025 Super XIII season. He won the French Under-19 Championship in 2025 with Avignon.

Lis joined Saint-Estève XIII Catalan, the feeder club of the Dragons, in June 2025.

In November 2025 he was promoted to the Catalans Dragons first team squad ahead of the 2026 Super League season.

Lis made his debut for the Catalans Dragons in the Challenge Cup in February 2026 against the Batley Bulldogs at the Fox's Biscuits Stadium.

He was rewarded with a bumper six-year contract extension in March 2026, the longest contract extension in the clubs history.

=== International ===
Lis played for the French under-19 team in their summer tour of 2024.

He was selected by Maxime Greseque for France and made his debut on February 22, 2025, against Morocco at the Parc des Sports in Avignon in a 34–10 victory.

Lis was called up to the France B team for a match against the Koalas in November 2025. France lost 10–28 to the representative team made up from Australian players playing in the French Championship.

In September 2026 Lis was included in an extended squad of forty players preparing for the 2026 World Cup. He did not make the final squad for the 2026 Rugby League World Cup.
