= Léo Llong =

French rugby league footballer

Leo Llong
Personal information
- Full name: Léo Llong
- Born: 22 August 2001 (age 25) Pyrénées-Orientales, Occitania, France
- Height: 6 ft 0 in (1.82 m)
- Weight: 14 st 2 lb (90 kg)

Playing information
- Position: Second-row, Loose forward
Club
Years	Team	Pld	T	G	FG	P
2022	Catalans Dragons	1	0	0	0	0
2023–	St Estève	0	0	0	0	0
	Total	1	0	0	0	0
- Source: As of 28 January 2023

Léo Llong (born 22 August 2001) is a French professional rugby league footballer who plays as a second-row or loose forward for St Estève in the Elite 1 Championship.

In 2022, he made his Catalans debut in the Super League against the Wigan Warriors.
