= Catalans Dragons =

French rugby league club, based in Perpignan

Club information
- Full name: Catalans Dragons XIII
- Nickname(s): The Dragons, The Dracs
- Short name: Catalans Dragons
- Colours: White, Gold and Red
- Founded: 3 June 2005; 21 years ago
- Website: Official website

Current details
- Ground: Stade Gilbert Brutus (10,460)
- CEO: Sébastien Munoz
- Chairman: Bernard Guasch
- Coach: John Cartwright
- Competition: Super League
- 2026 season: 9th

Uniforms
Home colours	Away colours
- British Championships: 0
- League Leaders' Shields: 1 (2021)
- Challenge Cups: 1 (2018)

The Catalans Dragons (French: Dragons Catalans; Catalan: Dracs Catalans) are a French professional rugby league club based in Perpignan, Pyrénées-Orientales, France. Founded in 2000 as Union Treiziste Catalane, the club adopted its current name in 2006 when it joined Super League, becoming the second French club to compete in the competition after Paris Saint-Germain Rugby League, and the first to establish a lasting presence.

The club plays its home matches at Stade Gilbert Brutus and wears red, gold and white, colours reflecting its Catalan heritage. It is now one of the leading clubs in French rugby league and the country's main representative at international level. Bernard Guasch has served as club president since its foundation. The team is currently coached by Australian John Cartwright, who succeeded Joel Tomkins in May 2026 and subsequently extended his contract until the end of the 2028 season.

Since joining Super League, the Catalans Dragons have established themselves as one of the competition's leading clubs, reaching the Grand Final twice, in 2021 and 2023, and becoming the first non-British club to reach this stage of the competition. They also reached their first Challenge Cup final in 2007 before winning the competition in 2018, securing the first major trophy won by a French club.

== History ==
=== 2000–2005: Formation in Elite 1 ===
The club was founded in 2000 after the merger of two teams in the area of Perpignan, XIII Catalan and AS Saint-Estève. The merged team took the name Union Treiziste Catalane, often abbreviated to UTC.

XIII Catalan were founded in 1935 and thus were founding members of the French Championship. During their run, they won 11 French Championships and 11 Lord Derby Cups. AS Saint-Estève were founded in 1965. They won six championships and four Lord Derby Cups. There were two other clubs in the twelve-team competition in Pyrénées-Orientales: Pia XIII and Saint-Cyprien. In 2002 Saint-Cyprien joined the merged UTC side. UTC won the 2005 French Championship and the 2004 and 2005 Lord Derby Cups.

=== 2006–2007: Transfer to Super League and Challenge Cup final ===
Catalans Dragons logo used in 2006 and 2007.

In 2006, UTC transferred from the French to British rugby league system, joining the Super League XI following a successful application in 2005. They were selected ahead of Toulouse Olympique and Villeneuve Leopards. After having planned to be called Perpignan, the club was named Catalans Dragons to represent the whole Catalonia region, with matches played in Carcassonne and Narbonne, as well as across the border in Figueres in Spain while expansion work at the Stade Gilbert Brutus took place. while a new club, Saint-Estève XIII Catalan, was formed in the French Championship to serve as a reserve team for the club. The club set a target for 75% of the players be qualified to play for France.

The Catalans are the second French side to play in the Super League. The first, Paris Saint-Germain, lasted only two seasons. Both rugby codes have their stronghold in the southwest of France, with the north favouring association football.

To ensure that the Catalans had the best French players available to them, the French rugby league decided to let them sign players from other French clubs without paying a transfer fee. The RFL also made them exempt from relegation for their first three years in Super League.

Many at the time believe the Catalans would be joined by other French clubs, but the idea of expanding into France had critics.

The Catalans won their first ever Super League match 38–30 against Wigan on 11 February 2006, at Stade Aimé Giral. The club encountered difficulties in their first season in the Super League. Many of less experienced French players suffered from tiredness towards the end of an injury-marred campaign. A particular loss included captain Stacey Jones, who missed much of the season with a broken arm. The team finished bottom of the table, but the three-year exemption from relegation kept them in the Super League.

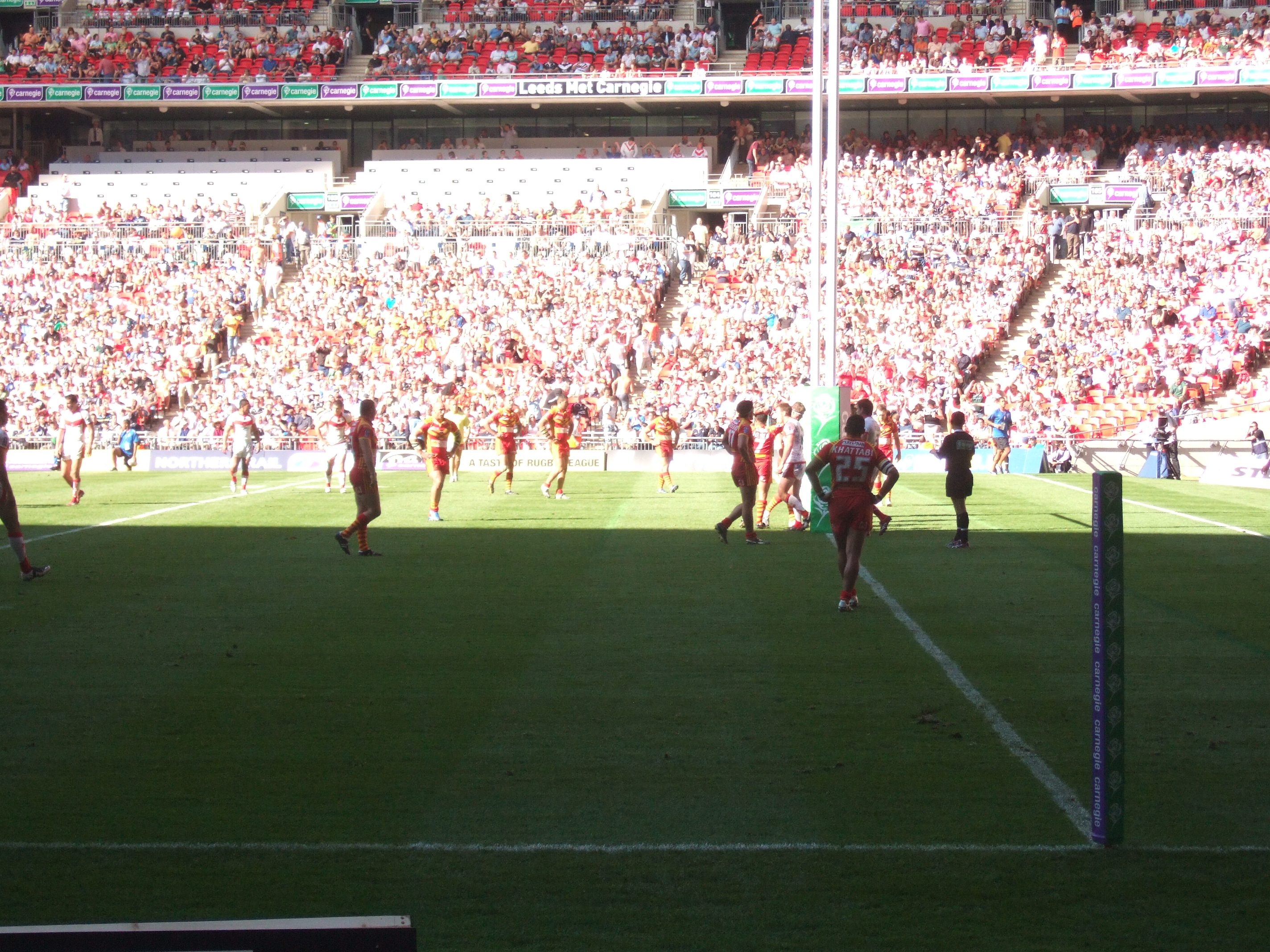
Catalans Dragons during their first Challenge Cup Final in 2007 at Wembley Stadium.

The year 2007 saw a strong recruitment by new coach Mick Potter with a string of high-profile signings from Australia, including Clint Greenshields, Casey McGuire, Jason Croker and Aaron Gorrell, all seasoned NRL campaigners. Gorrell, a goalkicking hooker, impressed in the first month but sustained a bad knee injury in February's win over Leeds and missed the rest of the season. On 10 March 2007, it was announced that Newcastle Knights hooker Luke Quigley would cover Gorrell's absence for the remainder of the campaign, but a number of players sustained injuries throughout the campaign.

On 29 July 2007, the Catalans became the first French side and first non-British side to reach the final of the Challenge Cup after beating Wigan 37–24 in the semi-final. The Catalans lost the 2007 Challenge Cup Final against St. Helens at Wembley Stadium on 25 August 2007. They finished the 2007 season in tenth place.

=== 2008–2017: Improvement in league results ===
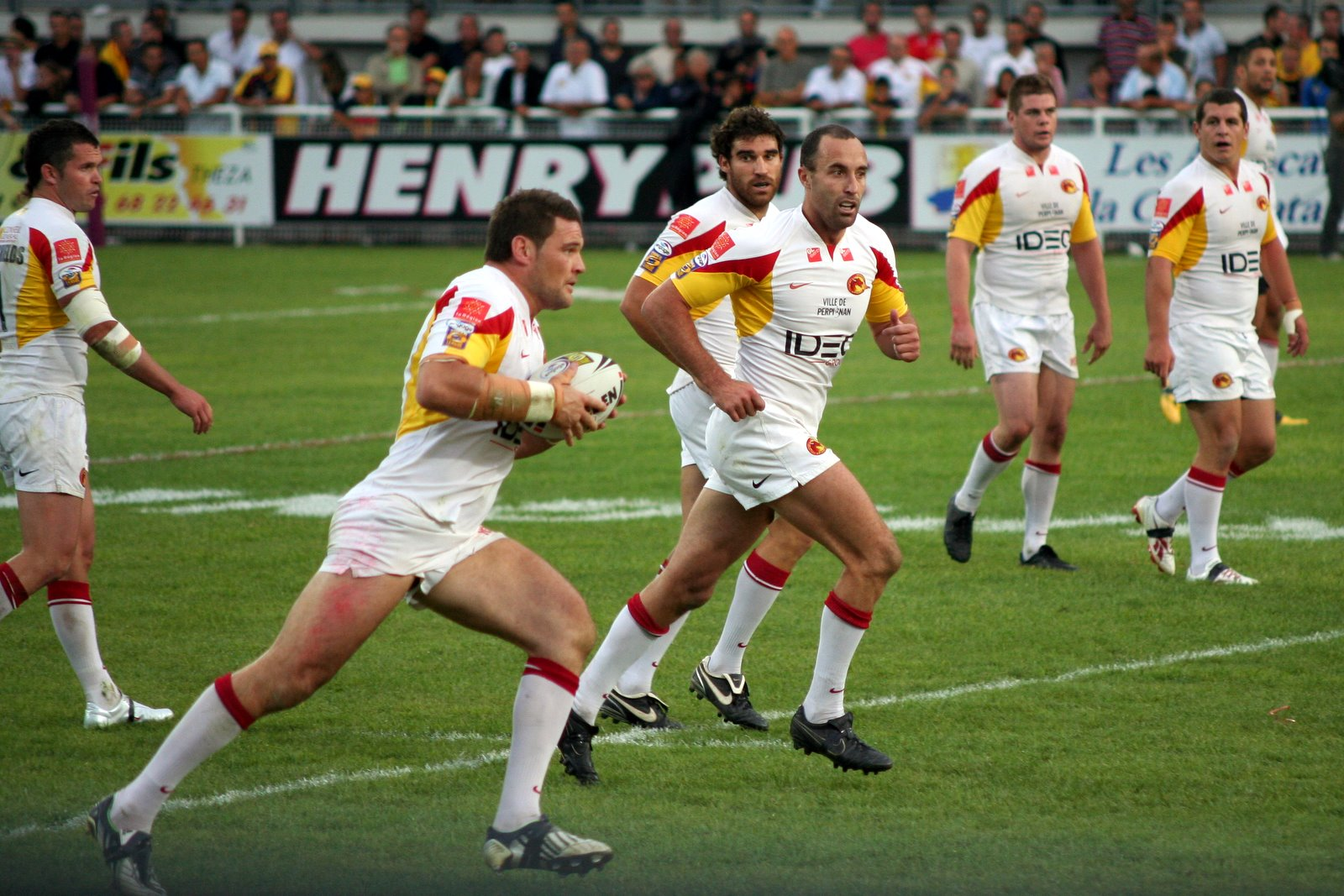
Catalans Dragons playing at Gilbert Brutus in 2009

In 2008, the Catalans secured their first playoff berth by finishing third in the league. They thrashed Warrington 46–8 in their first-ever playoff match on 13 September in Perpignan, but 20 September saw Wigan end up victorious in what had been a close game in the second half of their elimination final, with Wigan winning 50–26.

Coach Mick Potter left the Dragons at the end of the 2008 season to replace Daniel Anderson at St Helens.

In 2009, they were involved in two historic milestones for the sport of rugby league in Europe. During their match away to the Welsh club Crusaders on 23 May, the two clubs played the first Super League match to not feature an English team. History was also created on 20 June, when the club played in the first Super League game to be played in Spain, at Barcelona's Estadi Olímpic Lluís Companys, the venue for the 1992 Summer Olympics, against Warrington. The Dragons led 10–6 at halftime, but Warrington finished as the winners 12–24. The purpose of the latter fixture was to promote the sport in Catalonia, with around 1000 tickets being sold in the local area, and the game was televised on the Catalan channel El 33. Immediately after the game, Walters commented that the event in Spain could become an annual one, apparently complementing comments made by the club's general manager about using a new high-speed link between Perpignan and Spain, supposed to start running within two years.

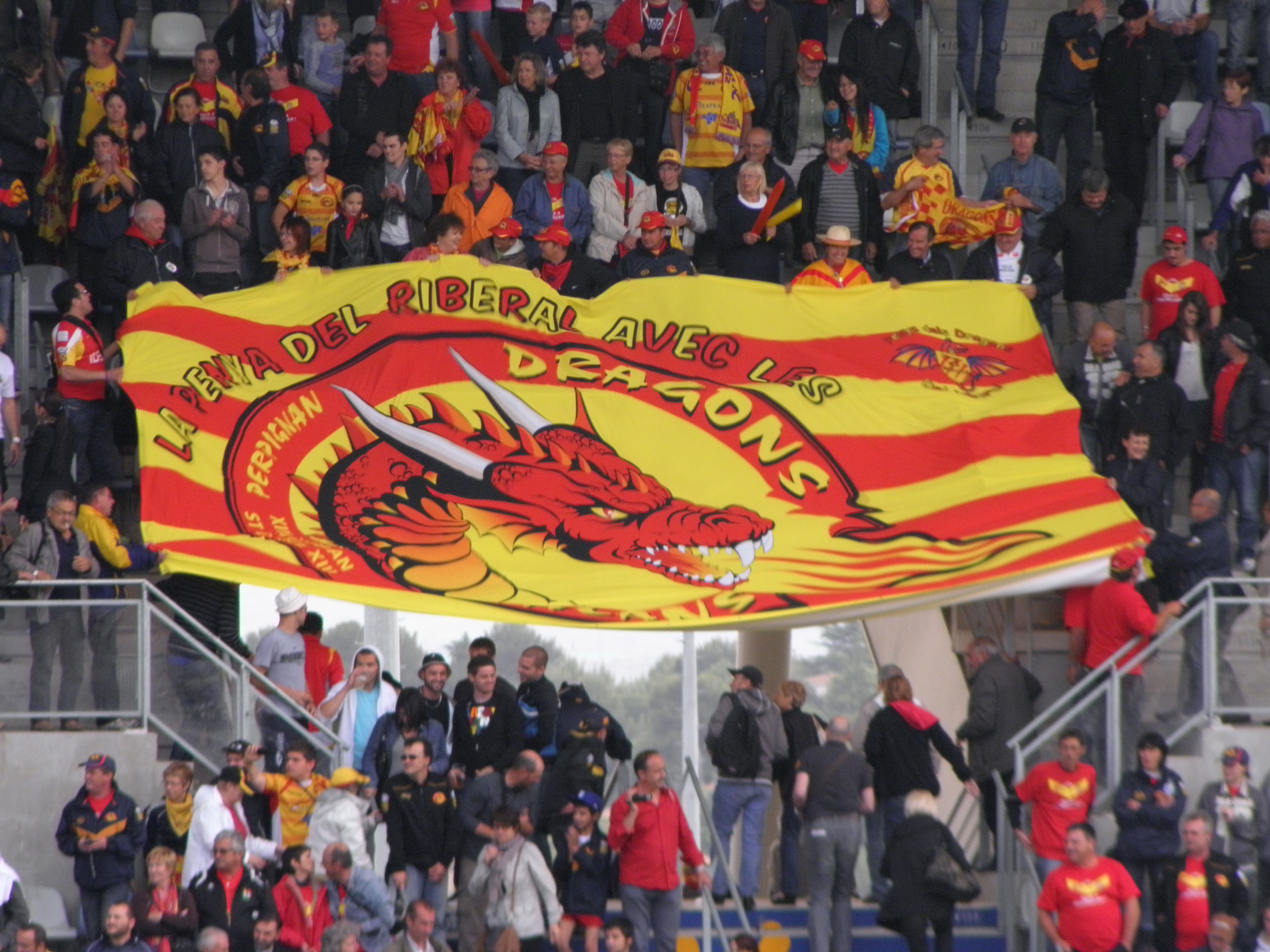
Catalans Dragons supporters during a home game against Wigan Warriors in 2011

In 2016 Catalans Dragons celebrated ten years in the Super League competition. After a recruitment drive, which saw a number of transfers from the NRL, expectations were high. After opening defeats to Wigan and Hull FC, the Dragons edged Leeds 32–28 in round three and then took seven wins from their next eight matches. Following their 42–32 win over Salford at the end of April, Laurent Frayssinous' side sat second in the table, level on points with leaders Warrington. However, a series of injury setbacks to key players in the second half of the season saw them drop down the table. Catalans lost their final six regular season games which meant they headed into the Super 8s two points adrift of fourth-placed St Helens. Five defeats from seven saw them finish the season in sixth place and miss out on a play-off spot. After a difficult two years at Huddersfield, Jodie Broughton's move to the south of France saw him kick-start his career. The winger scored 19 tries in 2016 including four in the Dragons' 30–12 win over St Helens in April. Todd Carney was released after two seasons at Catalans.

=== 2018–present: Establishment as a top club ===
On 25 August 2018, Catalans Dragons won their first British Rugby League trophy, after defeating Warrington 20–14 in the 2018 Challenge Cup Final, in the process becoming the first non-English team to win the competition.

During the 2019 season, Catalans Dragons held their home match against Wigan at the Camp Nou in Barcelona. The match was the first Super League game in Spain and attracted a record attendance for a Super League game, outside of the Grand Final or Magic Weekend, of 31,555. The game resulted in a 33–16 victory for the Dragons.

On 28 January 2020, Catalans Dragons announced that they had signed Israel Folau despite him holding to the Biblical teaching that those who practice homosexuality without repenting will go to hell (going so far as to suggest that the 2019–20 Australian bushfires were God's judgment on Australia for allowing same sex marriage and abortion). Wigan Warriors responded by saying that their next game against Catalans would be named Pride Day.

In 2021, Catalans won Super League's League Leaders' Shield for the first time, following a 31–30 golden point extra time victory over reigning champions St Helens during Magic Weekend. On 9 October 2021, Catalans played in their first ever Super League Grand Final with the opponents being reigning champions St Helens. Catalans lead the match in the second half but a try late to St Helens saw Catalans lose 12–10. In the 2022 Super League season, Catalans finished 4th on the table and qualified for the playoffs. The club would be eliminated from the playoffs in the first week, suffering a shock 20-10 loss against Leeds.

In the 2023 Super League season, Catalans finished second on the table, equal on points with Wigan who finished first. They would eventually reach the grand final after beating St Helens in the semi-final which ended the clubs four-year dominance of the competition. Catalans would go on to lose the 2023 Super League Grand Final 10-2 against Wigan. Catalans became the first team since the Super League era began in 1996 to not score a try in the final. In the 2024 Super League season, Catalans had a disappointing campaign finishing 7th on the table and missing out on the playoffs. In the 2025 Super League season, Catalans had an even tougher season than what they experienced in 2024 with the club finishing 9th on the table.

== Stadium ==
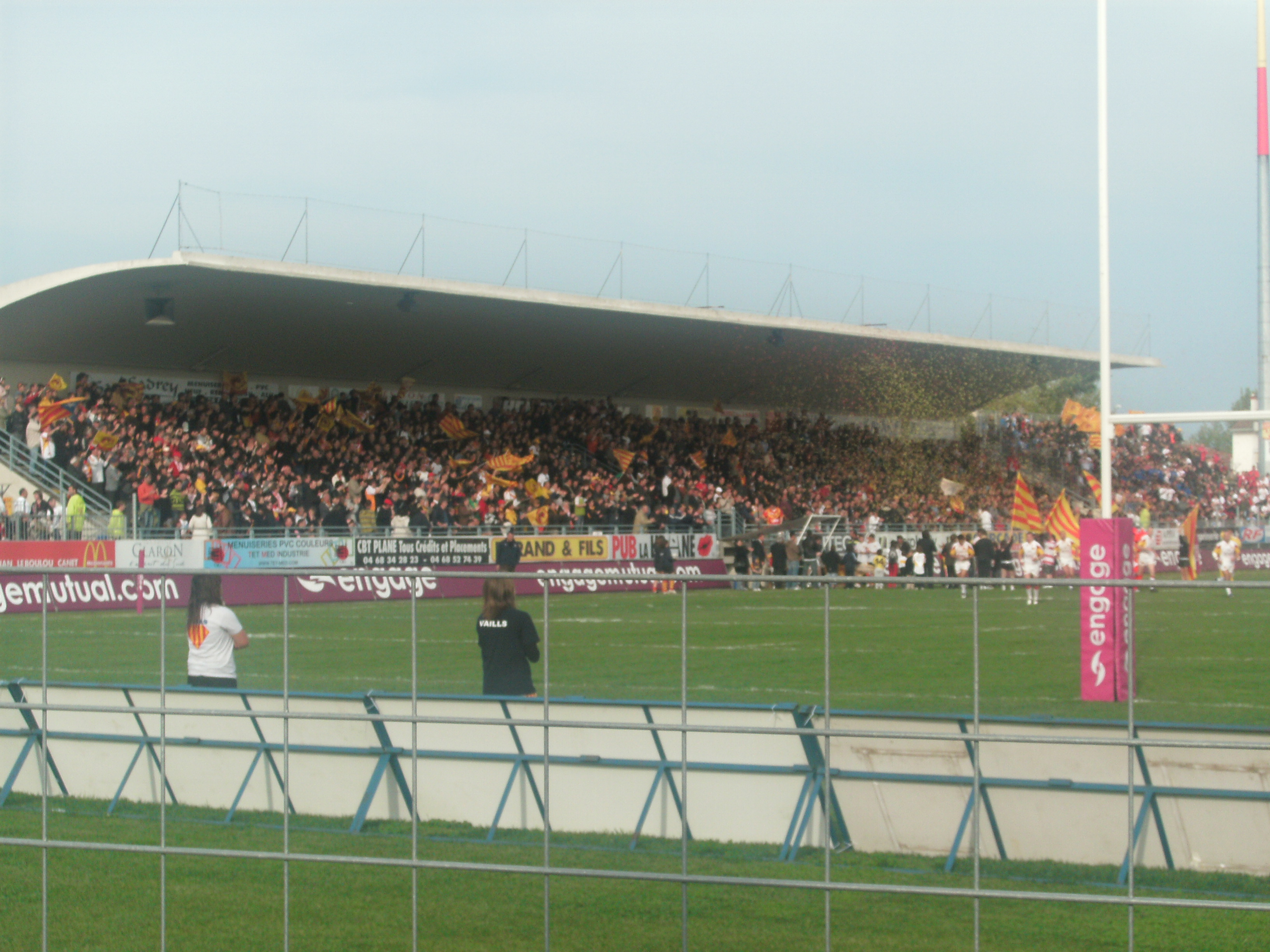
Stade Gilbert Brutus, home ground of the Catalans Dragons.

The Catalans Dragons play their home matches at Stade Gilbert Brutus in Perpignan, a stadium historically associated with rugby league in the region. Named after Gilbert Brutus, a former French rugby union player, coach, referee and official, the ground was previously used by XIII Catalan, one of the two clubs which merged to form Union Treiziste Catalane in 2000.

When the Dragons entered Super League in 2006, Stade Gilbert Brutus required extensive renovation to meet the competition's requirements. During their inaugural season, the club therefore played its home matches at several venues across the region, including Stade Aimé Giral in Perpignan, Stade Albert Domec in Carcassonne, the Parc des Sports et de l'Amitié in Narbonne and Stade Saint-Michel in Canet-en-Roussillon. The Dragons played their first Super League match at Stade Aimé Giral on 11 February 2006, defeating Wigan Warriors 38–30 in front of 11,122 spectators.

Stade Gilbert Brutus underwent an initial phase of redevelopment in 2006 and 2007, including the renovation of the Bonzoms Stand, which provided approximately 3,000 seats. The Dragons returned to the ground in 2007. A further expansion followed in 2011, with the construction of a new covered stand on the western side of the stadium, providing 2,500 additional seats, alongside hospitality facilities, a club shop and administrative offices. The growth of the club during its early Super League seasons was accompanied by increasing attendances. Season ticket sales rose from 2,150 in 2006 to more than 5,000 in 2009, while average home attendances increased from 6,542 to 9,529 over the same period. On 20 June 2009, the Dragons staged a home fixture against Warrington Wolves at the Estadi Olímpic Lluís Companys in Barcelona, attracting 18,150 paying spectators despite a 12–24 defeat. The club returned to Barcelona on 18 May 2019, hosting Wigan Warriors at Camp Nou. The Dragons won 33–16 in front of 31,555 spectators, setting a new attendance record for a regular-season Super League match. The fixture formed part of the club's efforts to strengthen its presence beyond Perpignan and promote rugby league throughout Catalonia.

Further redevelopment of Stade Gilbert Brutus was planned during the 2020s, with the proposed demolition and reconstruction of the Guasch-Laborde Stand. The project aims to increase the stadium's capacity and improve its hospitality facilities, providing additional commercial revenue for the club.. By early 2026, the demolition of the existing stand was expected to take place towards the end of the year, with completion of the new stand planned for 2027. The project was estimated to cost between €14 million and €15 million.. In October 2026, reports indicated that the Catalans Dragons were considering staging a Super League home match away from Perpignan during the 2027 redevelopment works, with Hull Kingston Rovers among the possible opponents.

== Kit sponsors and manufacturers ==
Year	Kit Manufacturer	Main Shirt Sponsor
2000–2008	ISC	none
2009	Nike	IDEC
2010–2011	ISC	Seafrance
2012–2018	ISC	la Region
2019–2021	O'Neills	la Region
2022–2026	Macron	la Region

== 2027 squad ==
2027 Catalans Dragons Squad
First team squad			Coaching staff
(France) Guillermo Aispuro-Bichet – FB, CE, SH; (Australia) Josh Allen – PR; (New Zealand) Jesse Arthars – WG, CE, FB; (France) Amir Bourouh – HK; (France) Julian Bousquet – PR; (Italy) Nathan Brown – LF, PR; (England) Joe Burgess – WG; (France) Hugo Cellier – CE; (Australia) Ben Condon – SR, PR; (France) Léo Darrélatour – WG, CE; (France) Adrian Delarose – PR, SR; (France) Giovanni Descalzi – PR; (England) Lewis Dodd – SH	(Australia) Tyson Gamble – SO; (Australia) Cole Geyer – HK; (France) Mickaël Goudemand – SR, LF; (Australia) Manase Kaho – WG; (France) Matthieu Laguerre – CE, SR; (Samoa) Luciano Leilua – SR; (France) Alexis Lis – PR, SR; (France) Lenny Marc – WG, CE, FB; (France) Franck Maria – SR, PR, LF; (France) Clément Martin – CE, WG	(England) Alex Mellor – SR, CE; (France) Romain Navarette – PR; (France) Arthur Romano – CE, SR; (Tonga) Hame Sele – PR, LF; (Samoa) Charlie Staines – FB, WG; (France) Ugo Tison – HK, SO; (France) Luca Walsh – SH, SO; (England) Harvey Wilson – LF, SR, HK	Head coach: (Australia) John Cartwright; Assistant coaches: (France) Laurent Frayssinous; (England) Michael McIlorum; (Australia) Mitchell Pearce; Legend: (c) Captain(s); (vc) Vice-captain(s); (gk) = Goal kicker

== 2027 transfers ==
=== Gains ===
Player	From	Contract	Date
(New Zealand) Jesse Arthars	Brisbane Broncos	2 years	18 June 2026
(Australia) Tyson Gamble	Newcastle Knights	2 years	25 June 2026
(France) Amir Bourouh	Hull FC	2 years	15 August 2026
(France) Arthur Romano	Hull FC	2 years	17 September 2026
(Samoa) Luciano Leilua	St. George Illawarra Dragons	3 years	19 August 2026
(Tonga) Hame Sele	St. George Illawarra Dragons	2 years	1 October 2026
(France) Luca Walsh	St Helens	1 year	15 September 2026
(England) Joe Burgess	Hull KR	2 years	22 September 2026
(England) Alex Mellor	Castleford Tigers	2 years	26 September 2026
(Australia) Cole Geyer	Oldham RLFC	2 years	10 October 2026
(Italy) Nathan Brown	Manly-Warringah Sea Eagles	1 year	14 October 2026

=== Losses ===
Player	From	Contract	Date
(Australia) Toby Sexton	Perth Bears	2 years	2 December 2025
(Australia) Solomona Faataape	St Helens	2 years	10 August 2026
(France) Alrix Da Costa	Hull FC	1 year	15 August 2026
(Serbia) Nick Čotrić	Leeds Rhinos	4 years	3 September 2026
(Australia) Edenn Rogers-Smith	Leeds Rhinos	2 years	3 September 2026
(England) Kruise Leeming	Wigan Warriors	End of loan - return to parent club	12 September 2026
(Scotland) Matty Russell			12 September 2026
(Tonga) Chris Satae	Saint-Estève XIII Catalan	1 year	25 October 2026

=== Retired ===
Player	Date
(France) Benjamin Garcia	8 July 2026
(England) Tommy Makinson	9 August 2026

== Staff ==
=== Coaching staff ===
Position	Staff
Head Coach	(Australia) John Cartwright
Assistant Coach	(France) Laurent Frayssinous
Assistant Coach	(England) Micky McIlorum
Assistant Coach	(Australia) Mitchell Pearce
Performance Manager	(Australia) Ryan Whitley
Head of Analysis	(France) Mathis Giroux

=== Club Officials ===
President and Chairman	(France) Bernard Guasch
Vice President	(France) Jean-François Maillol
Chief Executive	(France) Sébastien Munoz
Sporting Director	(France) Benjamin Garcia
Commercial Director	(France) Christophe Levy
Finance & Legal Director	(France) Chantal Biasotto
Youth Training & Development	(France) Thomas Bosc

=== Coaches ===
Since joining Super League in 2006, the Catalans Dragons have undergone several periods of development under a succession of predominantly Australian and British coaches, each corresponding to a different stage in the club's history. The club's first head coach was Australian Mick Potter, appointed in 2006 to oversee its entry into the competition. Under his leadership, the Dragons gradually established themselves and quickly made their mark on the European rugby league scene, reaching the Challenge Cup final in 2007 before finishing third in Super League in 2008. This achievement earned Potter the Super League Coach of the Year award and helped establish the club as a competitive force. In 2009, Potter was replaced by fellow Australian Kevin Walters. Although Walters guided the team to the semi-finals in his first season, the 2010 campaign ended with the Dragons finishing bottom of the league, highlighting the club's difficulties in maintaining consistent performances. His contract was not renewed at the end of the season. The appointment of Trent Robinson in 2011 marked a return to competitiveness. The Dragons returned to the upper reaches of the table, qualifying for the play-offs in 2011 and finishing fourth in 2012, although they were unable to reach the Grand Final. Robinson was named Super League Coach of the Year in 2011 in recognition of the team's performances. He subsequently left the club to join the Sydney Roosters.

In 2013, Laurent Frayssinous became the first French head coach in the club's history. His tenure represented a period of continuity, although results remained inconsistent. The Dragons regularly qualified for the play-offs and notably reached the semi-finals in 2014, but failed to sustain their progress. After several mixed seasons, Frayssinous was dismissed during the 2017 campaign amid poor results.

The team was then placed under the temporary charge of Jérôme Guisset and Michael Monaghan for several weeks, before the appointment of Englishman Steve McNamara, a former head coach of the England national team, in June 2017. Taking charge at a critical moment, he managed to keep the club in Super League during his first season by winning the Million Pound Game. McNamara subsequently undertook a major rebuilding process which led to the most successful period in the club's history. The Dragons won the Challenge Cup in 2018, their first major trophy, before reaching the Super League Grand Final in both 2021 and 2023. In 2021, McNamara was named Super League Coach of the Year after guiding the club to its first League Leaders' Shield and Grand Final appearance. Remaining in charge for eight seasons, McNamara oversaw a period of stability and sustained progress. His departure in May 2025 marked the end of this era.

The position was initially filled on an interim basis by Joel Tomkins, a former Dragons player who had joined the coaching staff. He was subsequently confirmed as head coach and tasked with beginning a new phase of development, based on rebuilding the squad and promoting locally developed players. Tomkins left the club in April 2026 for personal reasons, with Ryan Sheridan taking temporary charge of the team, assisted by Micky McIlorum and Mitchell Pearce.. On 19 May 2026, Australian John Cartwright was appointed head coach following his departure from Hull FC. Initially appointed until the end of the 2026 season, he subsequently extended his contract until the end of 2028.

Catalans Dragons head coaches

No.	Name	Years
1	(Australia) Mick Potter	2006–2008
2	(Australia) Kevin Walters	2009–2010
3	(Australia) Trent Robinson	2011–2012
4	(France) Laurent Frayssinous	2013–2017
5	(France) Jérôme Guisset (Australia) Michael Monaghan (interim)	2017

No.	Name	Years
6	(England) Steve McNamara	2017–2025
7	(England) Joel Tomkins	2025–2026
8	(England) Ryan Sheridan (interim)	2026
9	(Australia) John Cartwright	2026–present

Mick Potter, the club's first head coach.

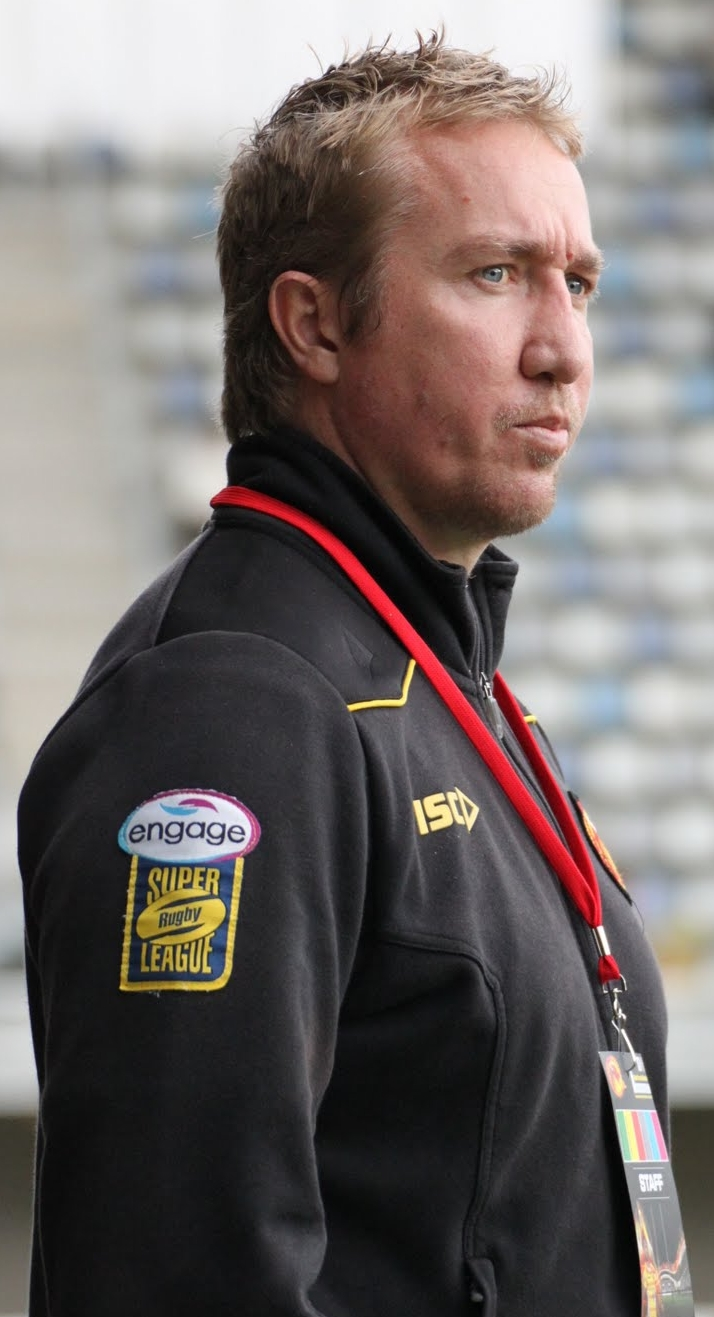
Trent Robinson, head coach from 2011 to 2012.

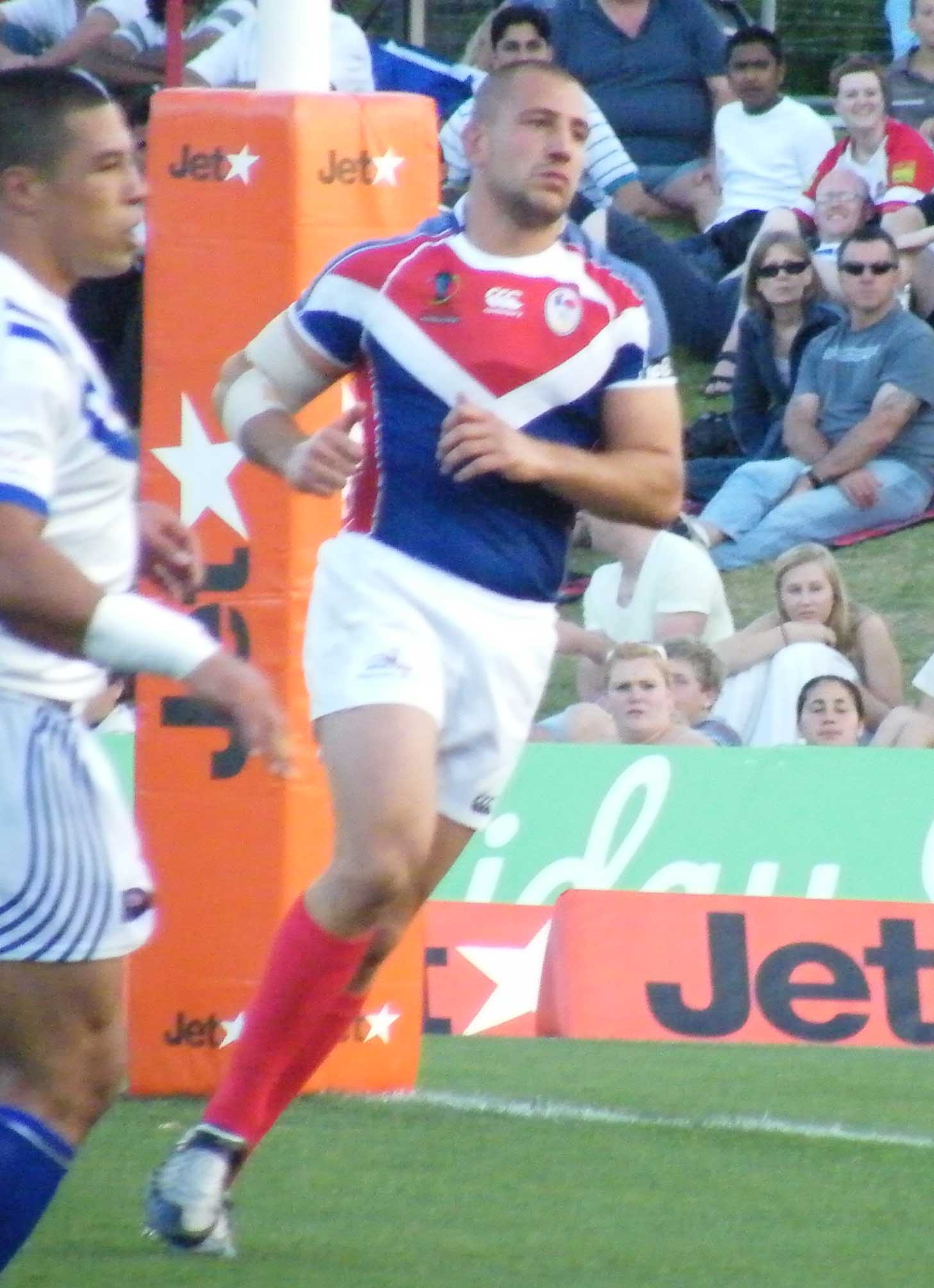
Jérôme Guisset, who served as interim coach in 2017.

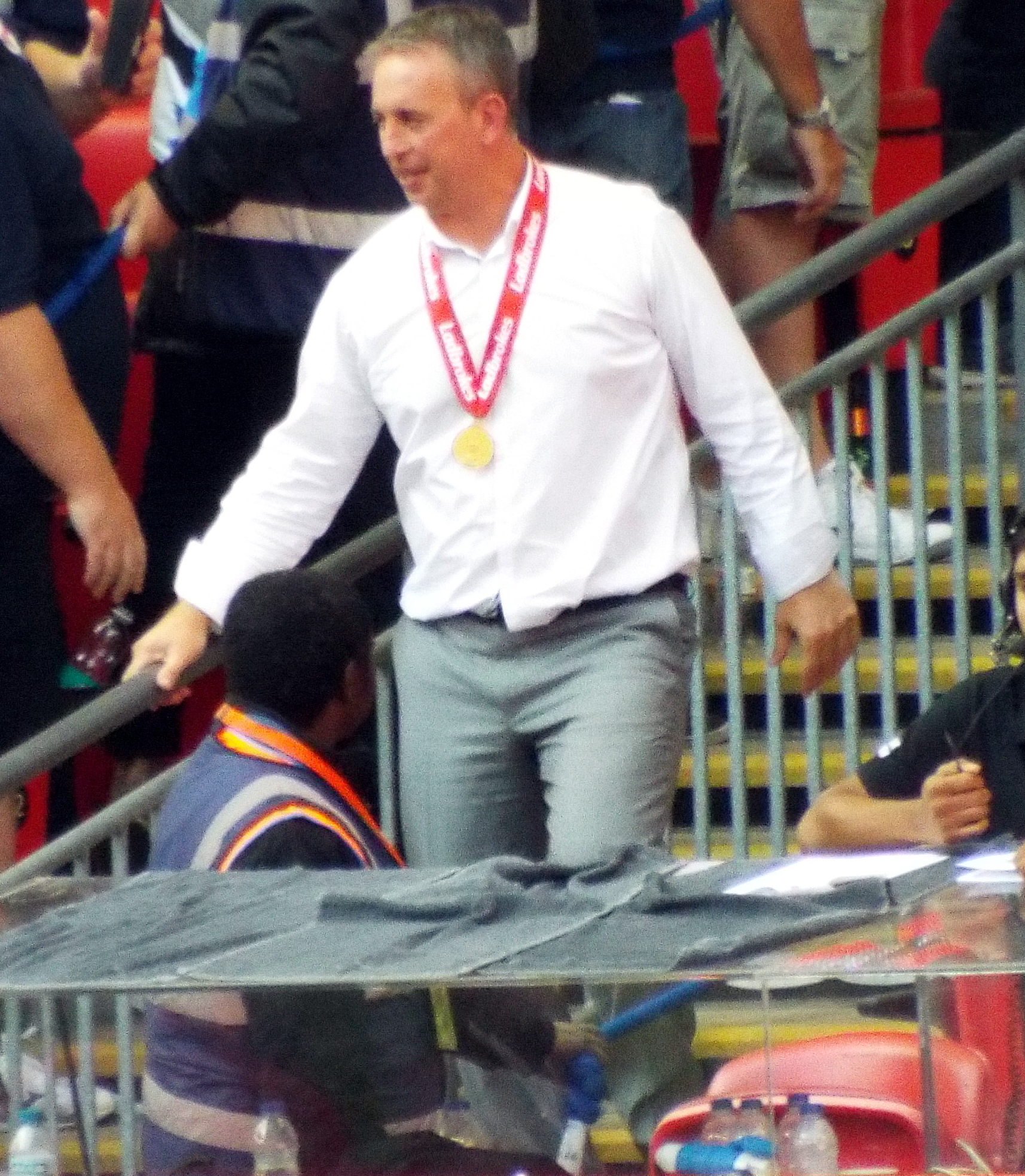
Steve McNamara, head coach from 2017 to 2025.

== Season-by-season record ==
Season	Regular season Super League								Play-offs Super League							Challenge Cup
Season	Pos.	Pts	Pld	W	D	L	PF	PA	Result	Pld	W	D	L	PF	PA	Challenge Cup
2006	12th	16	28	8	0	20	601	894	Did not qualify	–	–	–	–	–	–	Quarter-finals
2007	10th	21	27	10	1	16	570	685	Did not qualify	–	–	–	–	–	–	Runners-up
2008	3rd	34	27	16	2	9	694	625	Second round	2	1	0	1	72	58	Round of 16
2009	8th	26	27	13	0	14	613	660	Semi-finals	3	2	0	1	61	49	Round of 16
2010	14th	12	27	6	0	21	409	747	Did not qualify	–	–	–	–	–	–	Semi-finals
2011	6th	31	27	15	1	11	689	626	Second round	2	1	0	1	56	50	Round of 16
2012	4th	36	27	18	0	9	812	611	Second round	2	0	0	2	26	73	Quarter-finals
2013	7th	28	27	13	2	12	619	604	First round	1	0	0	1	4	14	Quarter-finals
2014	7th	29	27	14	1	12	733	667	Semi-finals	3	2	0	1	54	66	Round of 16
2015	7th	28	30	13	2	15	739	770	Did not qualify	–	–	–	–	–	–	Quarter-finals
2016	6th	30	30	15	0	15	723	716	Did not qualify	–	–	–	–	–	–	Quarter-finals
2017	13th	25	31	12	1	18	625	843	Did not qualify	–	–	–	–	–	–	Round of 16
2018	7th	25	30	12	1	17	596	750	Did not qualify	–	–	–	–	–	–	Winners
2019	7th	26	29	13	0	16	553	745	Did not qualify	–	–	–	–	–	–	Quarter-finals
2020	4th	16	13	8	0	5	376	259	Semi-finals	2	1	0	1	28	62	Quarter-finals
2021	1st	38	23	19	0	4	688	398	Runners-up	2	1	0	1	38	22	Quarter-finals
2022	4th	32	27	16	0	11	539	513	First round	1	0	0	1	10	20	Quarter-finals
2023	2nd	40	27	20	0	7	722	420	Runners-up	2	1	0	1	14	16	Round of 16
2024	7th	30	27	15	0	12	474	427	Did not qualify	–	–	–	–	–	–	Quarter-finals
2025	9th	20	27	10	0	17	425	652	Did not qualify	–	–	–	–	–	–	Semi-finals
2026	9th	20	27	10	0	17	537	802	Did not qualify	–	–	–	–	–	–	Quarter-finals

Key: Pos. = League position; Pts = League points; Pld = Matches played; W = Wins; D = Draws; L = Losses; PF = Points for; PA = Points against.

== Honours ==
The following table summarises the Catalans Dragons' main achievements in the major competitions in which the club has competed. The Dragons have won one major cup title, the 2018 Challenge Cup, as well as the League Leaders' Shield in 2021. The Catalans Dragons have appeared in four major finals, winning one, the 2018 Challenge Cup. They have also reached the Super League Grand Final twice, in 2021 and 2023.

Catalans Dragons honours
League

Super League

- Runners-up (2): 2021 and 2023
- Semi-finalists (3): 2009, 2014 and 2020

Regular season

- Winners (1): 2021
- Runners-up (1): 2023
Cup

Challenge Cup

- Winners (1): 2018
- Runners-up (1): 2007
- Semi-finalists (2): 2010 and 2025

Catalans Dragons major finals
Competition	Date	Winners	Score	Runners-up	Venue	Attendance
Challenge Cup	25 August 2007	St Helens	30–8	Catalans Dragons	Wembley Stadium, London	84,241
Challenge Cup	25 August 2018	Catalans Dragons	20–14	Warrington Wolves	Wembley Stadium, London	50,672
Super League	9 October 2021	St Helens	12–10	Catalans Dragons	Old Trafford, Manchester	45,177
Super League	14 October 2023	Wigan Warriors	10–2	Catalans Dragons	Old Trafford, Manchester	58,137

== See also ==
- Rugby Football League expansion
- Catalans Dragons Wheelchair
- Saint-Estève XIII Catalan
- Rugby league in Catalonia
