= 2012 Warrington Wolves season =

- Super League XVII Rank: 3rd
- 2012 record: Wins: 9; draws: 1; losses: 3
- Points scored: For: 395; against: 258

Team information
- Chairman: Steven Broomhead
- Head coach: (England) (Australia) Tony Smith
- Captain: (England) Adrian Morley
- Stadium: Halliwell Jones Stadium
- Avg. attendance: 11,845
- High attendance: 15,000 v St. Helens (30/3/12)

Top scorers
- Tries: Atkins = 11
- Goals: Hodgson = 30
- Points: Hodgson = 76
← 2011	List of seasons	2013 →

This article details the Warrington Wolves Rugby League Football Club's 2012 season. This is the clubs seventeenth season of the Super League era. Warrington Wolves won their eighth Challenge Cup with a 35-18 win against Leeds Rhinos in the final.

== 2012 Super League XVII play-offs fixtures and results ==
LEGEND
Win
Draw
Loss

Date	Competition	Rnd	Vrs	H/A	Venue	Result	Score	Tries	Goals	Att	TV	Report
05/02/12	Super League XVII	1	Hull F.C.	A	KC Stadium	Draw	20-20	Waterhouse, Williams, Grix, Evans	Westwood (2)	12,710		
12/02/12	Super League XVII	2	London Broncos	H	Halliwell Jones Stadium	Won	50-10	Atkins (2), Briers (2), J.Monaghan (2), Bridge (2), Ratchford	Westwood (5), Briers (2)	11,118		
18/02/12	Super League XVII	3	Huddersfield Giants	A	Galpharm Stadium	Won	22-32	Riley (2), Myler, Blythe, J.Monaghan, Bridge	Briers (4)	8,184	Sky Sports	
26/02/12	Super League XVII	4	Hull Kingston Rovers	H	Halliwell Jones Stadium	Won	42-10	Riley (2), Atkins (2), Westwood (2), Bridge	Hodgson (7)	11,916		
03/03/12	Super League XVII	5	Bradford Bulls	A	Odsal Stadium	Won	10-23	Riley, Higham, Atkins, Waterhouse	Bridge (3) Briers (DG)	11,318	Sky Sports	
09/03/12	Super League XVII	6	Leeds Rhinos	A	Headingley Stadium	Lost	26-18	Blythe, Hill, Westwood	Briers (3)	17,120	Sky Sports	
18/03/12	Super League XVII	7	Wakefield Trinity Wildcats	H	Halliwell Jones Stadium	Won	32-30	Myler (2), Atkins, Westwood, Grix, J.Monaghan	Briers (4)	10,686		
23/03/12	Super League XVII	8	Wigan Warriors	A	DW Stadium	Won	20-22	Atkins, J.Monaghan, Briers	Hodgson (5)	21,267	Sky Sports	
30/03/12	Super League XVII	9	St. Helens	H	Halliwell Jones Stadium	Lost	16-28	Hodgson, J.Monaghan, Atkins	Hodgson (2)	15,000	Sky Sports	
05/04/12	Super League XVII	10	Widnes Vikings	H	Halliwell Jones Stadium	Won	46-12	Bridge (2), Riley (3), Hodgson, Atkins, Dwyer	Hodgson (7)	12,042	Sky Sports	
09/04/12	Super League XVII	11	Catalans Dragons	A	Stade Gilbert Brutus	Lost	44-16	Higham, Riley, Dwyer	Hodgson (2)	11,500	Sky Sports	
22/04/12	Super League XVII	12	Castleford Tigers	H	Halliwell Jones Stadium	Won	54-06	J.Monaghan (2), Atkins (2), Hodgson (2), Grix, Riley, Waterhouse, Bridge	Hodgson (7)	10,590		
06/05/12	Super League XVII	13	Salford City Reds	H	Halliwell Jones Stadium	Won	24-20	Williams (2), Currie, Carvell	O'Brien (4)	10,437		
20/05/12	Super League XVII	14	Wakefield Trinity Wildcats	A	Belle Vue							
26/05/12	Super League XVII	15	Widnes Vikings	N	Etihad Stadium						Sky Sports	
03/06/12	Super League XVII	16	Hull Kingston Rovers	A	New Craven Park							
08/06/12	Super League XVII	17	Leeds Rhinos	H	Halliwell Jones Stadium						Sky Sports	
24/06/12	Super League XVII	18	Hull F.C.	H	Halliwell Jones Stadium							
29/06/12	Super League XVII	19	Salford City Reds	A	Salford City Stadium							
09/07/12	Super League XVII	20	Catalans Dragons	H	Halliwell Jones Stadium						Sky Sports	
22/07/12	Super League XVII	21	Castleford Tigers	A	The PROBIZ Coliseum							
29/07/12	Super League XVII	22	Bradford Bulls	H	Halliwell Jones Stadium							
0/0/12	Super League XVII	23	Team	H/A	Venue	W/D/L	Score	Try Scorers	Goal Scorers	Attendance	TV	Match Report
0/0/12	Super League XVII	24	Team	H/A	Venue	W/D/L	Score	Try Scorers	Goal Scorers	Attendance	TV	Match Report
0/0/12	Super League XVII	25	Team	H/A	Venue	W/D/L	Score	Try Scorers	Goal Scorers	Attendance	TV	Match Report
0/0/12	Super League XVII	26	Team	H/A	Venue	W/D/L	Score	Try Scorers	Goal Scorers	Attendance	TV	Match Report
0/0/12	Super League XVII	27	Team	H/A	Venue	W/D/L	Score	Try Scorers	Goal Scorers	Attendance	TV	Match Report

== 2012 Carnegie Challenge Cup fixtures and results ==
LEGEND
Win
Draw
Loss

Date	Competition	Rnd	Vrs	H/A	Venue	Result	Score	Tries	Goals	Att	TV	Report
15/04/12	Challenge Cup	Round 4	Keighley Cougars	A	Cougar Park	Won	18-44	J.Monaghan, Westwood, Hill, Williams, Dwyer, Riley, Harrison, Wood	Briers (6)	2,196		
28/04/12	Challenge Cup	Round 5	Bradford Bulls	H	Halliwell Jones Stadium	Won	32-16	J.Monaghan (3), Hodgson, Riley, Atkins	Hodgson (4)	5,505	BBC One	
13/05/12	Challenge Cup	Q-Final	Catalans Dragons	A	Stade Gilbert Brutus	Won	22-32	J.Monaghan, Hodgson, Riley, Wood, Bridge	Hodgson (6)	11,000	BBC Two	
15/07/12	Challenge Cup	S-Final	Huddersfield Giants	N	Salford City Stadium						BBC Two	

== 2012 squad ==
Released November 2011.

Number	Nat	Player	Position	Previous club
1	(Australia)	Brett Hodgson	FB	Huddersfield Giants
2	(England)	Chris Riley	RW	Warrington Wolves Academy
3	(England)	Chris Bridge	LC	Bradford Bulls
4	(England)	Ryan Atkins	C	Wakefield Trinity Wildcats
5	(Australia)	Joel Monaghan	LW	Canberra Raiders
6	(Wales)	Lee Briers	SO	St. Helens
7	(England)	Richard Myler	SH	Salford City Reds
8	(England)	Adrian Morley	PR	Sydney Roosters
9	(Australia)	Michael Monaghan	HK	Manly Sea Eagles
10	(England)	Garreth Carvell	PR	Hull
11	(Australia)	Trent Waterhouse	SR	Penrith Panthers
12	(England)	Ben Westwood	SR	Wakefield Trinity Wildcats
13	(England)	Ben Harrison	LF	Warrington Wolves Academy
14	(England)	Mickey Higham	HK	Wigan Warriors
15	(Republic of Ireland)	Simon Grix	LF	Halifax
16	(England)	Paul Wood	PR	Warrington Wolves Academy
17	(England)	Michael Cooper	PR	Warrington Wolves Academy
18	(England)	Matty Blythe	C	Warrington Wolves Academy
19	(England)	Stefan Ratchford	C	Salford City Reds
20	(England)	Chris Hill	PF	Leigh Centurions
21	(Republic of Ireland)	Tyrone McCarthy	SR	Warrington Wolves Academy
22	(Wales)	Rhys Williams	W	Warrington Wolves Academy
23	(Wales)	Rhys Evans	W	Warrington Wolves Academy
24	(England)	Gareth O'Brien	SO/SH	Warrington Wolves Academy
25	(Wales)	Ben Evans	PR	Warrington Wolves Academy
26	(New Zealand)	David Solomona	SR	Bradford Bulls
27	(England)	James Laithwaite	SR	Warrington Wolves Academy
28	(England)	Ryan Shaw	CE/WG/SO	Warrington Wolves Academy
29	(England)	Danny Bridge	SR	Wigan Warriors
30	(England)	James Mendieka	SO	Warrington Wolves Academy
31	(England)	Jordan Burke	FB	Warrington Wolves Academy
32	(England)	Ben Currie	SR	Warrington Wolves Academy
33	(England)	Brad Dwyer	HK	Warrington Wolves Academy
35	(England)	Glenn Riley	PR	Warrington Wolves Academy

=== 2012 transfers in/out ===
In

	Name	Position	Signed from	Date
(Australia)	Trent Waterhouse	Second Row	Penrith Panthers	October 2011
(England)	Chris Hill	Prop	Leigh Centurions	October 2011
(England)	Stefan Ratchford	Utility Back	Salford City Reds	October 2011

Out

	Name	Position	Signed from	Date
(Australia)	Matt King	Centre	South Sydney Rabbitohs	October 2011
(New Zealand)	Louis Anderson	Second Row	Catalans Dragons	October 2011
(England)	Jon Clarke	Hooker	Widnes Vikings	October 2011
(England)	Lee Mitchell	Second Row	Castleford Tigers	November 2011 (1 Year Loan)
