= 2011 Warrington Wolves season =

- Super League XVI Rank: 1st
- 2011 record: Wins: 22; draws: 0; losses: 5
- Points scored: For: 1072; against: 401

Team information
- Chairman: Steven Broomhead
- Head coach: (England) (Australia) Tony Smith
- Captain: (England) Adrian Morley
- Stadium: Halliwell Jones Stadium
- Avg. attendance: 11,169
- High attendance: 13,024 v St. Helens (24 June 2011)

Top scorers
- Tries: J.Monaghan - 22
- Goals: Brett Hodgson - 120
- Points: Brett Hodgson - 308
← 2010	List of seasons	2012 →

This article details the Warrington Wolves Rugby League Football Club's 2011 season. This is the clubs sixteenth season of the Super League era. The club will also look to defend the Challenge Cup following victory at Wembley Stadium against Leeds Rhinos in August 2010.

== Pre-season ==
Warrington Wolves played 3 pre-season fixtures before the new Super League season kicks off. The Wolves faced Widnes Vikings, Leigh Centurions and Wigan Warriors. The Wolves ran out comfortable winners at Widnes winning by 48-18 and also at Leigh by 58-10. Wolves new signings Brett Hodgson and Joel Monaghan both made their debuts for the club in the victory at Leigh Centurions.

The fixture against Wigan Warriors is for Jon Clarke's Testimonial after he has now been at the club for 10 consecutive seasons. Warrington Wolves fell to a 16-22 defeat to end the pre-season campaign.

LEGEND
Win
Draw
Loss

Friendly	Date	Opponent	Result	Score	Home/Away	Venue	Tries	Goals	Attendance
Friendly	2 January 2011	Widnes Vikings	W	18-48	Away	Halton Stadium	Harvey (3), Williams (2), Solomona, R Evans, Myler, Riley	Harvey (3), Bridge	3,758
Friendly	23 January 2011	Leigh Centurions	W	10-58	Away	Leigh Sports Village	King (2), M Monaghan, J Monaghan, Myler, Briers, Blythe, Solomona, Williams, Harvey	Hodgson (8), Harvey	3,528
Testimonial	2 February 2011	Wigan Warriors	L	16-22	Home	Halliwell Jones Stadium	Clarke, Williams, Briers	Hodgson (2), Westwood	5,757

== 2011 Table ==
Pos	Team	Pld	W	D	L	PF	PA	PD	Pts	Qualification
1	Warrington Wolves (L)	27	22	0	5	1072	401	+671	44	Play-offs
2	Wigan Warriors	27	20	3	4	852	432	+420	43	Play-offs
3	St Helens	27	17	3	7	782	515	+267	37	Play-offs
4	Huddersfield Giants	27	16	0	11	707	524	+183	32	Play-offs
5	Leeds Rhinos (C)	27	15	1	11	757	603	+154	31	Play-offs
6	Catalans Dragons	27	15	1	11	689	626	+63	31	Play-offs
7	Hull Kingston Rovers	27	14	0	13	713	692	+21	28	Play-offs
8	Hull F.C.	27	13	1	13	718	569	+149	27	Play-offs
9	Castleford Tigers	27	12	2	13	664	808	−144	26	
10	Bradford Bulls	27	9	2	16	570	826	−256	20	
11	Salford City Reds	27	10	0	17	542	809	−267	20	
12	Harlequins	27	6	1	20	524	951	−427	13	
13	Wakefield Trinity Wildcats	27	7	0	20	453	957	−504	10 (Note: Wakefield deducted 4 points for entering administration.)	
14	Crusaders	27	6	0	21	527	857	−330	8 (Note: Crusaders deducted 4 points for entering administration.)	

Source: rugbyleagueproject.org
Rules for classification: 1) Points; 2) Points difference; 3) Number of points scored;
(C) Champions; (L) League Leaders' Shield winners

== 2011 Engage Super League Fixtures and Results ==
LEGEND
Win
Draw
Loss

Round	Date	Opponent	Result	Score	Home/Away	Venue	Tries	Goals	Attendance	TV
1	12 February 2011	Huddersfield Giants	Lost	18 - 28	Away	Millennium Stadium	J. Monaghan, Atkins, Westwood	Hodgson (3)	30,891	SKY
2	20 February 2011	Hull Kingston Rovers	Won	24 - 22	Home	Halliwell Jones Stadium	Riley, Myler, Atkins, J. Monaghan, Hodgson	Hodgson (2)	10,899	
3	25 February 2011	St. Helens	Won	18 - 25	Away	Halton Stadium	Briers (2), Myler, Anderson	Hodgson (4), DG Briers	10,514	SKY
4	5 March 2011	Leeds Rhinos	Won	40 - 24	Home	Halliwell Jones Stadium	R.Evans, Myler, Briers, J. Monaghan, Grix, Riley, Higham,	Hodgson (6)	11,438	SKY
5	11 March 2011	Wakefield Trinity Wildcats	Won	6 - 22	Away	Belle Vue	Riley, Bridge, Atkins, Myler	Westwood (3)	5,072	SKY
6	20 March 2011	Harlequins RL	Won	82 - 6	Home	Halliwell Jones Stadium	Bridge (3), Myler, Hodgson, Blythe, R.Evans, Briers, Westwood, Morley, Solomona, Mitchell	Hodgson (13)	11,506	
7	25 March 2011	Wigan Warriors	Won	6 - 24	Away	DW Stadium	Blythe, J.Monaghan (2), Myler	Hodgson (4)	21,056	SKY
8	3 April 2011	Catalans Dragons	Lost	20 - 22	Home	Halliwell Jones Stadium	J. Monaghan (2), Riley, Myler	Hodgson (2)	10,056	
9	8 April 2011	Huddersfield Giants	Lost	29 - 10	Away	Galpharm Stadium	Hodgson (2)	Hodgson	7,224	SKY
10	15 April 2011	Crusaders	Won	64 - 6	Home	Halliwell Jones Stadium	Hodgson (2), Westwood (2), Williams, Anderson, Atkins (2), Bridge, J. Monaghan, Myler	Hodgson (10)	10,002	
11	22 April 2011	Salford City Reds	Won	0 - 60	Away	The Willows	Atkins, Myler, Briers (2), Bridge, Carvell, J. Monaghan, Williams (2), Wood	Hodgson (10)	7,496	
12	25 April 2011	Hull F.C.	Lost	10-24	Home	Halliwell Jones Stadium	J.Monaghan, Williams	Hodgson	12,036	
13	1 May 2011	Bradford Bulls	Won	14-58	Away	Grattan Stadium	Anderson (2), Atkins (2), M.Monaghan, J.Monaghan, King, Hodgson, Bridge, Higham, Briers	Hodgson (7)	14,134	
14	13 May 2011	Castleford Tigers	Won	62-0	Home	Halliwell Jones Stadium	O'Brien, Briers (2), King (2), Hodgson, Grix (2), Higham, Solomona, J.Monaghan	Hodgson (7), Briers (2)	9,958	SKY
15	27 May 2011	Leeds Rhinos	Won	6-42	Away	Headingley Carnegie Stadium	Briers (2), J.Monaghan, Solomona, King, Bridge, M.Monaghan	Hodgson (7)	17,276	SKY
16	3 June 2011	Crusaders	Won	16-56	Away	Racecourse Ground, Wrexham	Hodgson (3), Wood (2), King, Morley, Westwood, Atkins, Myler	Hodgson (8)	4,907	
17	12 June 2011	Salford City Reds	Lost	16-18	Home	Halliwell Jones Stadium	Bridge, Briers, Myler	Hodgson(2)	10,339	
18	19 June 2011	Hull Kingston Rovers	Won	16-46	Away	Craven Park	Grix, King (3), Atkins (2), Briers, Williams, Myler	Hodgson(5)	8,143	
19	24 June 2011	St. Helens	Won	35-28	Home	Halliwell Jones Stadium	M.Monaghan, Williams, King, Wood, Westwood, Hodgson	Hodgson (5)	13,024	SKY3D
20	1 July 2011	Castleford Tigers	Won	18-48	Away	The Probiz Coliseum	King (3), Hodgson (2), Myler, Blythe, J. Monaghan, Atkins	Hodgson (6)	5,947	
21	8 July 2011	Huddersfield Giants	Won	28-16	Home	Halliwell Jones Stadium	Hodgson, J.Monaghan (2), Myler, Anderson	Hodgson (4)	10,283	SKY3D
22	16 July 2011	Harlequins RL	Won	24-54	Away	The Stoop	Bridge (4), Carvell, J.Monaghan, Briers, Myler, Wood	Hodsgon (8), Briers	3,842	
23	31 July 2011	Bradford Bulls	Won	64-6	Home	Halliwell Jones Stadium	Atkins (4), King (2), Anderson (2), J.Monaghan, Myler, Cooper, Bridge	Bridge (10), Hodgson	10,641	
24	14 August 2011	Wakefield Trinity Wildcats	Won	66-12	Home	Halliwell Jones Stadium	Atkins (3), King (2), J.Monaghan (3), M.Monaghan, Hodgson (2)	Hodgson (5), Bridge (3)	10,641	
25	20 August 2011	Catalans Dragons	Won	12-25	Away	Stade Aime Giral	Bridge (2), Atkins, Briers	Bridge (4), DG Briers	9,495	
26	4 September 2011	Wigan Warriors	Won	39-12	Home	Halliwell Jones Stadium	M.Monaghan (2), J.Monaghan, King, Briers, Clarke	Bridge (7), DG M.Monaghan	13,024	SKY
27	9 September 2011	Hull F.C.	Won	12-34	Away	KC Stadium	Atkins, Riley (2), M.Monaghan, Bridge, J.Monaghan	Bridge (4), Briers	10,845	SKY

== 2011 Engage Super League XVI Play-offs Fixtures and Results ==
LEGEND
Win
Draw
Loss

Round	Date	Opponent	Result	Score	Home/Away	Venue	Tries	Goals	Attendance	TV
PO1	16 September 2011	Huddersfield Giants	Won	47-0	Home	Halliwell Jones Stadium	Riley (2), Bridge, J.Monaghan (2), King, Hodgson, Myler, Atkins	Bridge (2) Briers (2 + 1DG)	10,006	SKY
SF1	30 September 2011	Club Call/TBA			Home	Halliwell Jones Stadium				SKY 3D

== 2011 Carnegie Challenge Cup Fixtures and Results ==
LEGEND
Win
Draw
Loss

Round	Date	Opponent	Result	Score	Home/Away	Venue	Tries	Goals	Attendance	TV
4	8 May 2011	Keighley Cougars	Won	80-0	Home	Halliwell Jones Stadium	Atkins (3), Briers (2), Williams (2), Grix, Evans, Wood, King, M.Monaghan, O'Brian, Cooper	Briers (12)	6,582	
5	20 May 2011	Swinton Lions	Won	112-0	Home	Halliwell Jones Stadium	Riley (3), J.Monaghan (4), Bridge, Atkins, Williams, Briers (3), M.Monaghan, Carvell (3), Westwood (2), Grix	Briers (17)	4,440	
Q-Final	23 July 2011	Wigan Warriors	Lost	24-44	Home	Halliwell Jones Stadium	Myler (2), King, Solomona	Hodgson (4)	13,024	BBC

== 2011 Squad ==
As of 1 January 2011:

Number	Nat	Player	Position	Previous club
1	(Australia)	Brett Hodgson	FB	Huddersfield Giants
2	(England)	Chris Riley	RW	Warrington Wolves Academy
3	(Australia)	Matt King	RC	Melbourne Storm
4	(England)	Chris Bridge	LC	Bradford Bulls
5	(Australia)	Joel Monaghan	LW	Canberra Raiders
6	(Wales)	Lee Briers	SO	St. Helens
7	(England)	Richard Myler	SH	Salford City Reds
8	(England)	Adrian Morley	PR	Sydney Roosters
9	(Australia)	Michael Monaghan	HK	Manly Sea Eagles
10	(England)	Garreth Carvell	PR	Hull
11	(New Zealand)	Louis Anderson	SR	New Zealand Warriors
12	(England)	Ben Westwood	SR	Wakefield Trinity Wildcats
13	(England)	Ben Harrison	LF	Warrington Wolves Academy
14	(England)	Mickey Higham	HK	Wigan Warriors
15	(England)	Jon Clarke	HK	Harlequins RL
16	(England)	Paul Wood	PR	Warrington Wolves Academy
17	(Republic of Ireland)	Simon Grix	LF	Halifax
18	(England)	Michael Cooper	PR	Warrington Wolves Academy
19	(England)	Lee Mitchell	SR	Warrington Wolves Academy
20	(England)	Matty Blythe	SR	Warrington Wolves Academy
21	(Republic of Ireland)	Tyrone McCarthy	SR	Warrington Wolves Academy
22	(Wales)	Rhys Williams	W	Warrington Wolves Academy
23	(England)	Ryan Atkins	C	Wakefield Trinity Wildcats
24	(Wales)	Rhys Evans	W	Warrington Wolves Academy
26	(New Zealand)	David Solomona	PF	Bradford Bulls

=== 2011 Transfers In/Out ===
In

	Name	Position	Signed from	Date
(Australia)	Brett Hodgson	Full back	Huddersfield Giants	September 2010
(Australia)	Joel Monaghan	Centre/winger	Canberra Raiders	December 2010
(Scotland)	Ben Hellewell	Full back	Bradford Bulls	December 2010

Out

	Name	Position	Club Signed	Date
(England)	Kevin Penny	Winger	Wakefield Trinity Wildcats	September 2010
(New Zealand)	Vinnie Anderson	Second Row	Salford City Reds	September 2010
(England)	Richie Mathers	Full back	Castleford Tigers	September 2010
(Wales)	Rhys Williams	Winger	Crusaders	February 2011 (Loan)
(England)	Craig Harvey	Half back	Released	March 2011
