= 2010 Warrington Wolves season =

- 2010 Challenge Cup Winners champions
- Super League XV Rank: 3rd
- Play-off result: Round 2
- Challenge Cup: Won Final; Leeds Rhinos, 6 – 30
- 2010 record: Wins: 24; draws: 0; losses: 7
- Points scored: For: 849; against: 466

Team information
- Chairman: Steven Broomhead
- Head coach: (England) (Australia) Tony Smith
- Captain: (England) Adrian Morley
- Stadium: Halliwell Jones Stadium
- Avg. attendance: 10,947
- Agg. attendance: 142,305
- High attendance: 13,024 v Wigan (20/2/10)

Top scorers
- Tries: (England) Chris Riley (25)
- Goals: (England) Ben Westwood (44)
- Points: (England) Ben Westwood (112)
Home colours	Away colours
← 2009	List of seasons	2011 →

This article details the Warrington Wolves Rugby League Football Club's 2010 season. This is the clubs fifteenth season of the Super League era. The club will also look to defend the Challenge Cup following victory at Wembley Stadium against Huddersfield Giants in August 2009.

== Pre Season ==
The Wolves played three pre-season fixtures in total. The traditional Boxing Day fixture with rivals Widnes Vikings was postponed first on 26 December 2009 and then on 3 January 2010 due to the pitch being frozen. No further dates were attempted for this fixture. The Wolves first pre-season fixture saw them travel for the first time to Leigh Sports Village to face Leigh Centurions on 17 January 2010. The Wolves ran out 16–60 victors on the day. The club then travelled to Derwent Park to face Workington Town on 23 January 2010 in a game that helped raise funds for the area following the floods earlier this year. Warrington sent the Under 21s team but still had enough strength to record a 12–34 victory against the semi-professionals from Cumbria. Warrington's final warm up fixture was for Paul Wood's Testimonial and take place at Halliwell Jones Stadium on 27 January 2010 against Super League rivals Wigan Warriors. Wigan stole the show and recorded a 12–20 victory, this being the Warriors first ever victory at the new home of the Wolves since 2003.

Friendly	Date	Opponent	Result	Score	Home/Away	Venue	Tries	Goals	Attendance	TV
Friendly	17 January 2010	Leigh Centurions	W	60–16	Away	Leigh Sports Village				
Friendly	23 January 2010	Workington Town	W	12–34	Away	Derwent Park				
Testimonial	27 January 2010	Wigan Warriors	L	12–20	Home	Halliwell Jones Stadium			4,622	

== Super League ==
=== Table ===
Pos	Team	Pld	W	D	L	PF	PA	PD	Pts	Qualification
1	Wigan Warriors (L, C)	27	22	0	5	922	411	+511	44	Play-offs
2	St Helens	27	20	0	7	946	547	+399	40	Play-offs
3	Warrington Wolves	27	20	0	7	885	488	+397	40	Play-offs
4	Leeds Rhinos	27	17	1	9	725	561	+164	35	Play-offs
5	Huddersfield Giants	27	16	1	10	758	439	+319	33	Play-offs
6	Hull F.C.	27	16	0	11	569	584	−15	32	Play-offs
7	Hull Kingston Rovers	27	14	1	12	653	632	+21	29	Play-offs
8	Celtic Crusaders	27	12	0	15	547	732	−185	24	Play-offs
9	Castleford Tigers	27	11	0	16	648	766	−118	22	
10	Bradford Bulls	27	9	1	17	528	728	−200	19	
11	Wakefield Trinity Wildcats	27	9	0	18	539	741	−202	18	
12	Salford City Reds	27	8	0	19	448	857	−409	16	
13	Harlequins	27	7	0	20	494	838	−344	14	
14	Catalans Dragons	27	6	0	21	409	747	−338	12	

Source: Rugby League Project
Rules for classification: 1) Points; 2) Points difference; 3) Number of points scored;
(C) Champions; (L) League Leaders' Shield Winners

=== Matches ===
Round	Date	Opponent	Result	Score	Home/Away	Venue	Tries	Goals	Attendance	TV
1	7 February 2010	Harlequins RL	W	58 – 0	Home	Halliwell Jones Stadium	Carvell, Mathers, Monaghan, Bridge, Riley (5), Myler, Grix	Briers (7)	11,678	
2	13 February 2010	Castleford Tigers	W	16 – 28	Away	The Jungle	Grix, Riley, Briers, Myler (2)	Briers, Bridge (3)	7,569	Sky Sports
3	20 February 2010	Wigan Warriors	L	20 – 22	Home	Halliwell Jones Stadium	Myler, Riley, Solomona, L Anderson	Briers (2)	13,024	Sky Sports
4	28 February 2010	Huddersfield Giants	W	10 – 14	Away	Galpharm Stadium	King (2), Hicks	Myler	8,567	
5	7 March 2010	Crusaders	W	46 – 12	Home	Halliwell Jones Stadium	King (2), Grix, Westwood (2), Monaghan, Hicks, Solomona	Bridge (7)	11,113	
6	13 March 2010	Bradford Bulls	W	33 – 8	Home	Halliwell Jones Stadium	Myler, Atkins (2), King (2), Monaghan	Bridge (4), Monaghan (dg)	10,434	Sky Sports
7	19 March 2010	St. Helens	L	28 – 18	Away	GPW Recruitment Stadium	Grix, King, Harrison, Hicks	Bridge	17,500	
8	26 March 2010	Wakefield Trinity Wildcats	W	32 – 16	Home	Halliwell Jones Stadium	Riley (3), Bridge, Atkins (2)	Bridge (4)	10,743	
9	2 April 2010	Salford City Reds	W	32 – 2	Home	Halliwell Jones Stadium	Hicks (2), Atkins, Riley (2), Mathers, Solomona	Bridge (2)	11,467	
10	5 April 2010	Hull F.C.	W	10 – 29	Away	KC Stadium	Hicks (3), Myler, Monaghan	Hicks (2)	14,131	
11	11 April 2010	Hull Kingston Rovers	L	36 – 16	Away	Craven Park	Mathers, King, Riley	Westwood (2)	8,452	
12	25 April 2010	Catalans Dragons	W	40 – 6	Home	Halliwell Jones Stadium	Myler (2), Briers, Mathers, Riley, Cooper, Higham	Westwood (6)	9,619	
13	1 May 2010	Salford City Reds	W	16 – 68	Neutral	Murrayfield Stadium	Monaghan, Hicks (2), Atkins, Williams, Briers, Riley, V Anderson, Myler (2), Bridge, Solomona	Westwood (6), Briers, Bridge (3)	26,642	Sky Sports
14	14 May 2010	Leeds Rhinos	L	26 – 16	Away	Headingley Carnegie Stadium	King, Grix, Harrison	Bridge (2)	16,733	
15	23 May 2010	Huddersfield Giants	W	36 – 20	Home	Halliwell Jones Stadium	Hicks, King, Riley, Bridge, Morley, Wood	Bridge (4)	11,087	
16	4 June 2010	Salford City Reds	W	10 – 27	Away	The Willows	Mathers (2), Hicks, Higham, Solomona	Bridge (3), Briers (1 dg)	6,093	
17	11 June 2010	Hull Kingston Rovers	W	35 – 16	Home	Halliwell Jones Stadium	King, Atkins, Briers (2), Monaghan, L Anderson	Briers (5 + 1 dg)	9,216	
18	19 June 2010	Bradford Bulls	W	28 – 40	Away	Grattan Stadium, Odsal	Riley (2), Atkins, King, Briers, Higham (2)	Briers (6)	8,128	
19	27 June 2010	Leeds Rhinos	L	30 – 37	Home	Halliwell Jones Stadium	Hicks (2), King (2), Atkins, Riley	Briers (3)	10.442	
20	3 July 2010	Crusaders	W	10 – 30	Away	Racecourse Ground	Hicks (2), Riley (2), Higham, Solomona	Briers (2), Westwood	5,197	
21	11 July 2010	Castleford Tigers	W	54 – 30	Home	Halliwell Jones Stadium	Mathers, Hicks, Atkins, Riley, Myler (3), Morley, Solomona	Westwood (9)	10.577	
22	16 July 2010	Wigan Warriors	W	16 – 23	Away	DW Stadium	Hicks, Atkins, Myler, Westwood	Westwood (3), Briers (dg)	22,701	Sky Sports in 3D
23	24 July 2010	Catalans Dragons	L	29 – 28	Away	Stade Aime Giral	Hicks (2), Briers, V Anderson, Clarke	Westwood (4)	7,852	
24	1 August 2010	St. Helens	L	24 – 26	Home	Halliwell Jones Stadium	Westwood (2), Clarke, Wood	Westwood (4)	12,863	Sky Sports
25	15 August 2010	Wakefield Trinity Wildcats	W	18 – 36	Away	Hearwell Stadium	Riley, Hicks, Blythe, King (3), Briers	Westwood (3), Briers	5,562	
26	22 August 2010	Hull F.C.	W	36 – 18	Home	Halliwell Jones Stadium	Riley (2), Myler, Morley, Clarke, Westwood	Westwood (6)	10,042	Sky Sports
27	4 September 2010	Harlequins RL	W	22 – 36	Away	The Stoop	Bridge (2), Cooper, Clarke, Solomona (2)	Bridge (6)	3,211	

== Challenge Cup ==
Round	Date	Opponent	Result	Score	Home/Away	Venue	Tries	Goals	Attendance	TV
4	18 April 2010	Featherstone Rovers	W	48–24	Home	Halliwell Jones Stadium	Grix, Riley (2), Myler (3), V Anderson, Solomona (2)	Westwood (4), Bridge (2)	7,754	
5	8 May 2010	Huddersfield Giants	W	4 – 60	Away	Galpharm Stadium	Atkins, Bridge (5), Myler, Hicks (3), Riley, Higham	Westwood (4), Briers (2)	6,641	BBC
Quarter-finals	30 May 2010	Bradford Bulls	W	22 – 26	Away	Grattan Stadium	Hicks (2), Atkins, Briers, V Anderson	Bridge (3)	7.000	BBC
Semi-finals	8 August 2010	Catalans Dragons	W	54 – 12	Neutral	Stobart Stadium	King, Riley, Briers, Clarke, L Anderson (3), Harrison, Myler	Westwood (7), Myler, Briers	12,265	BBC
Final	28 August 2010	Leeds Rhinos	W	6 – 30	Neutral	Wembley Stadium	Hicks (3), Atkins (2), L Anderson	Westwood (3)	85,217	BBC

== Super League XV Play Offs ==
Round	Date	Opponent	Result	Score	Home/Away	Venue	Tries	Goals	Attendance	TV
PO1	10 September 2010	St. Helens	L	28 – 12	Away	GPW Recruitment Stadium	King (2), Bridge		14,632	Sky Sports
PO2	18 September 2010	Huddersfield Giants	L	22 – 34	Home	Halliwell Jones Stadium	Hicks (2), Higham (2)	Westwood (3)	8,050	Sky Sports

== 2010 Squad ==
As of 27 November 2009:

Number	Nat	Player	Position	Previous club
1	(England)	Richard Mathers	FB	Wigan Warriors
2	(England)	Chris Riley	RW	Warrington Wolves Academy
3	(Australia)	Matt King	RC	Melbourne Storm
4	(England)	Chris Bridge	LC	Bradford Bulls
5	(Australia)	Chris Hicks	LW	Manly Sea Eagles
6	(Wales)	Lee Briers	SO	St. Helens
7	(England)	Richard Myler	SH	Salford City Reds
8	(England)	Adrian Morley	PR	Sydney Roosters
9	(Australia)	Michael Monaghan	HK	Manly Sea Eagles
10	(England)	Garreth Carvell	PR	Hull
11	(New Zealand)	Louis Anderson	SR	New Zealand Warriors
12	(England)	Ben Westwood	SR	Wakefield Trinity Wildcats
13	(England)	Ben Harrison	LF	Warrington Wolves Academy
14	(England)	Mickey Higham	HK	Wigan Warriors
15	(England)	Jon Clarke	HK	Harlequins RL
16	(England)	Paul Wood	PR	Warrington Wolves Academy
17	(Republic of Ireland)	Simon Grix	LF	Halifax
18	(England)	Michael Cooper	PR	Warrington Wolves Academy
19	(England)	Lee Mitchell	SR	Warrington Wolves Academy
20	(England)	Matty Blythe	SR	Warrington Wolves Academy
21	(England)	Kevin Penny	WG	Warrington Wolves Academy
22	(Republic of Ireland)	Tyrone McCarthy	SR	Warrington Wolves Academy
23	(England)	Ryan Atkins	C	Wakefield Trinity Wildcats
24	(England)	Alex Thompson	HK	Warrington Wolves Academy
26	(New Zealand)	David Solomona	PF	Bradford Bulls
27	(New Zealand)	Vinnie Anderson	SR	St. Helens
28	(England)	Adam Neal	PR	Warrington Wolves Academy

== 2010 Transfers In/Out ==
In

	Name	Position	Signed from	Date
(New Zealand)	David Solomona	Second Row	Bradford Bulls	September 2009
(England)	Ryan Atkins	Centre	Wakefield Trinity Wildcats	September 2009
(England)	Richard Myler	Stand Off/Scrum Half	Salford City Reds	September 2009

Out

	Name	Position	Club Signed	Date
(England)	Paul Johnson	Hooker	Wakefield Trinity Wildcats	September 2009
(New Zealand)	Paul Rauhihi	Second Row	Retired	September 2009
(England)	Steve Pickersgill	Second Row	Widnes Vikings	September 2009
