= 2009 Warrington Wolves season =

- 2009 Challenge Cup champions
- Super League XIV Rank: 10th
- Play-off result: Didn't reach playoffs
- Challenge Cup: Won Final; Huddersfield Giants, 25 - 16
- 2009 record: Wins: 17; draws: 0; losses: 15
- Points scored: For: 649; against: 705

Team information
- Chairman: Steven Broomhead
- Head coach: (England) (Australia) Tony Smith
- Captain: (England) Adrian Morley
- Stadium: Halliwell Jones Stadium
← 2008	List of seasons	2010 →

The 2009 Warrington Wolves season was the 131st in the club's history. They competed in Super League XIV as well the 2009 Challenge Cup. They reached the Challenge Cup final in which they defeated Huddersfield Giants.

== Transfers ==
Transfers for 2009 (In)

List of players joining Warrington
Nat	Name	Transferred from	Date released
(England)	Garreth Carvell	Hull	October 2008
(England)	Micky Higham	Wigan Warriors	October 2008
(England)	Richie Mathers	Wigan Warriors	April 2009
(Ireland)	Brian Carney	Munster Rugby (union)	May 2009

Transfers for 2009 (Out)

List of players leaving Warrington
Nat	Name	Transferred to	Date released
(England)	Mark Gleeson	Halifax	July 2008
(England)	Rob Parker	Salford City Reds	October 2008
(Wales)	Andy Bracek	Barrow Raiders	October 2008
(England)	Martin Gleeson	Wigan Warriors	April 2009
(England)	Stuart Reardon	Hull	April 2009

== Full squad ==
Number	Nat	Player	Position	Previous club
2	(England)	Paul Johnson	RW	Bradford Bulls
4	(Australia)	Matt King	LC	Melbourne Storm
5	(England)	Kevin Penny	LW	Warrington Wolves
6	(Wales)	Lee Briers	SO	St. Helens
7	(Australia)	Michael Monaghan	SH	Manly Sea Eagles
8	(England)	Adrian Morley	PR	Sydney Roosters
9	(England)	Jon Clarke	HK	London Broncos
10	(New Zealand)	Paul Rauhihi	PR	North Queensland Cowboys
11	(New Zealand)	Louis Anderson	SR	New Zealand Warriors
12	(England)	Ben Westwood	SR	Wakefield Trinity Wildcats
13	(New Zealand)	Vinnie Anderson	LF	St. Helens
14	(England)	Mickey Higham	HK	Wigan Warriors
15	(England)	Paul Wood	PR	Warrington Wolves
16	(England)	Garreth Carvell	PR	Bradford Bulls
17	(England)	Steve Pickersgill	PR	Warrington Wolves
18	(England)	Mike Cooper	SR	Warrington Wolves
19	(England)	Chris Riley	LW	Warrington Wolves
20	(Ireland)	Simon Grix	SO	Halifax
21	(England)	Matty Blythe	LC	Warrington Wolves
22	(England)	Lee Mitchell	SR	Warrington Wolves
23	(Australia)	Chris Hicks	RW	Manly Sea Eagles
24	(Ireland)	Ben Harrison	PR	Barrow Island
25	(Ireland)	Chris Bridge	SO	Bradford Bulls
30	(England)	Richie Mathers	FB	Wigan Warriors

== Preseason ==
Competition	Round	Opponent	Result	Score	Home/Away	Venue	Attendance	Date
Friendly	N/A	Wigan Warriors	Loss	4-44	Home	Halliwell Jones Stadium	6,711	28/12/2008
Friendly	N/A	Hull Kingston Rovers	Loss	22-34	Home	Halliwell Jones Stadium	—	29/01/2009
Friendly	N/A	Swinton Lions	Win	26-36	Away	Park Lane	—	01/02/2009

== Super League ==
=== Table ===
Pos	Team	Pld	W	D	L	PF	PA	PD	Pts	Qualification
1	Leeds Rhinos (L, C)	27	21	0	6	805	453	+352	42	Play-offs
2	St Helens	27	19	0	8	733	466	+267	38	Play-offs
3	Huddersfield Giants	27	18	0	9	690	416	+274	36	Play-offs
4	Hull Kingston Rovers	27	17	1	9	650	516	+134	35	Play-offs
5	Wakefield Trinity Wildcats	27	16	0	11	685	609	+76	32	Play-offs
6	Wigan Warriors	27	15	0	12	659	551	+108	30	Play-offs
7	Castleford Tigers	27	14	0	13	645	702	−57	28	Play-offs
8	Catalans Dragons	27	13	0	14	613	660	−47	26	Play-offs
9	Bradford Bulls	27	12	1	14	653	668	−15	25	
10	Warrington Wolves	27	12	0	15	649	705	−56	24	
11	Harlequins	27	11	0	16	591	691	−100	22	
12	Hull F.C.	27	10	0	17	502	623	−121	20	
13	Salford City Reds	27	7	0	20	456	754	−298	14	
14	Celtic Crusaders	27	3	0	24	357	874	−517	6	

Source: Rugby League Project
Rules for classification: 1) Points; 2) Points difference; 3) Number of points scored;
(C) Champions; (L) League Leaders' Shield Winners

=== Matches ===
Competition	Round	Opponent	Result	Score	Home/Away	Venue	Attendance	Date
Super League XIV	1	St Helens R.F.C.	Loss	26-14	Away	GPW Recruitment Stadium	17,009	13/02/2009
Super League XIV	2	Catalans Dragons	Loss	20-40	Home	Halliwell Jones Stadium	7,947	21/02/2009
Super League XIV	3	Wakefield Trinity Wildcats	Loss	48-22	Away	Belle Vue	5,169	27/02/2009
Super League XIV	4	Leeds Rhinos	Loss	14-20	Home	Halliwell Jones Stadium	9,863	08/03/2009
Super League XIV	5	Harlequins RL	Loss	60-8	Away	The Twickenham Stoop	3,206	14/03/2009
Super League XIV	6	Hull Kingston Rovers	Win	24-12	Home	Halliwell Jones Stadium	8,457	22/03/2009
Super League XIV	7	Crusaders	Win	27-22	Home	Halliwell Jones Stadium	7,854	29/03/2009
Super League XIV	8	Salford City Reds	Loss	18-16	Away	The Willows	6,150	10/04/2009
Super League XIV	9	Castleford Tigers	Loss	6-28	Home	Halliwell Jones Stadium	8,202	13/04/2009
Super League XIV	10	Bradford Bulls	Win	22-58	Away	Grattan Stadium	8,643	17/04/2009
Super League XIV	11	Huddersfield Giants	Win	40-18	Home	Halliwell Jones Stadium	8,007	26/04/2009
Super League XIV	12	Hull Kingston Rovers	Loss	28-36	Neutral	Murrayfield Stadium	30,122	03/05/2009
Super League XIV	13	Hull F.C.	Win	16-18	Away	KC Stadium	10,997	16/05/2009
Super League XIV	14	Wigan Warriors	Win	16-8	Home	Halliwell Jones Stadium	10,718	22/05/2009
Super League XIV	15	Castleford Tigers	Win	18-34	Away	The Jungle	5,628	06/06/2009
Super League XIV	14	Bradford Bulls	Loss	10-21	Home	Halliwell Jones Stadium	9,606	14/06/2009
Super League XIV	17	Catalans Dragons	Win	12-24	Away	Estadi Olímpic Lluís Companys, Barcelona	18,150	20/06/2009
Super League XIV	18	Hull FC	Win	24-12	Home	Halliwell Jones Stadium	9,170	28/06/2009
Super League XIV	19	Celtic Crusaders	Win	6-22	Away	Brewery Field	3,231	04/07/2009
Super League XIV	20	St Helens RLFC	Loss	26-40	Home	Halliwell Jones Stadium	12,075	11/07/2009
Super League XIV	21	Huddersfield Giants	Loss	28-10	Away	Galpharm Stadium	7,107	19/07/2009
Super League XIV	22	Salford City Reds	Win	62-20	Home	Halliwell Jones Stadium	8,906	26/07/2009
Super League XIV	23	Leeds Rhinos	Loss	24-22	Away	Headingley Stadium	13,386	01/08/2009
Super League XIV	24	Wigan Warriors	Loss	36-16	Away	JJB Stadium	13,452	14/08/2009
Super League XIV	25	Wakefield Trinity Wildcats			Home	Halliwell Jones Stadium		21/08/2009
Super League XIV	26	Hull Kingston Rovers			Away	New Craven Park		06/09/2009
Super League XIV	27	Harlequins RL			Home	Halliwell Jones Stadium		13/09/2009

== Challenge Cup ==
Competition	Round	Opponent	Result	Score	Home/Away	Venue	Attendance	Date
Challenge Cup 2009	4	York City Knights	Win	56-10	Home	Halliwell Jones Stadium	4,703	04/04/2009
Challenge Cup 2009	5	Featherstone Rovers	Win	8-56	Away	Chris Moyles Stadium	3,127	10/05/2009
Challenge Cup 2009	QF	Hull Kingston Rovers	Win^{[A]}	24-24	Away	New Craven Park	7,671	30/05/2009
Challenge Cup 2009	SF	Wigan Warriors	Win	26-39	Neutral	Stobart Stadium Halton	12,975	08/08/2009
Challenge Cup 2009	Final	Huddersfield Giants	Win	25-16	Neutral	Wembley Stadium	76,560	29/08/2009

== Notes ==
^{a} Note A: Warrington won 24-25 via the golden point rule.
