= 2014 Warrington Wolves season =

- Super League XIX Rank: 5th
- Challenge Cup: Semi-finals
- 2014 record: Wins: 20; draws: 1; losses: 10
- Points scored: For: 793; against: 515

Team information
- Chairman: Steven Broomhead
- Head coach: Tony Smith
- Captain: Michael Monaghan & Ben Westwood
- Stadium: Halliwell Jones Stadium
- Avg. attendance: 9,870
- High attendance: 13,157 (vs St Helens, 13 Feb 2014)

Top scorers
- Tries: Joel Monaghan (26)
- Goals: Chris Bridge (67)
- Points: Chris Bridge (178)
← 2013	List of seasons	2015 →

This article details the Warrington Wolves RLFC's 2014 season. The Wolves have been present in all previous Super League seasons dating back to 1996. This year they are competing in Super League XIX and the 2014 Challenge Cup.

== Preseason ==
Warrington played their annual Festive Derby friendly against the Widnes Vikings in late 2013, snatching a 36-32 victory in a close-fought contest. In the new year, the Wolves completed a three-week training camp in Australia, including sessions with NRL clubs Sydney Roosters, Manly Sea Eagles and Canterbury Bulldogs. They played two more friendlies upon returning to England, beating Championship side Leigh Centurions 34-20 at Leigh Sports Village and facing off against newly reformed Salford Red Devils a few days later, battling to a 14-8 victory in their first home fixture of 2014.

LEGEND
Win
Draw
Loss

Date	Competition	Vs	H/A	Venue	Result	Score	Tries	Goals	Att	TV	Report
29/12/13	Friendly	Widnes Vikings	A	Select Security Stadium	Won	36-32	Russell, Penny, Ormsby, Atkins, Currie, Riley, Peet	O'Brien (4)	3,025	No	
02/02/14	Friendly	Leigh Centurions	A	Leigh Sports Village	Won	34-20	Penny (3), Burke, Shaw, Philbin	O'Brien (5)	1,024	No	
05/02/14	Friendly	Salford Red Devils	H	Halliwell Jones Stadium	Won	14-8	J Monaghan, Westwood, C Riley	Westwood	3,022	No	

== Super League XIX – regular season ==
The Wolves faced a challenging start to the season, with their opening three fixtures all replays of 2013 losses. History repeated itself against St Helens R.F.C. at home and Leeds Rhinos away in Rounds 1 and 2 respectively, bringing about Warrington's worst start since the 2009 season. However, a gritty 18-16 win at home to Hull F.C. followed by two consecutive away wins to 2013's bottom teams, London Broncos and Salford Red Devils got their season under way with some points on the board. Next came a replay of the 2013 Grand Final against the Wigan Warriors, where an error-strewn performance in wet and windy conditions led to further disappointment for the Wolves in a 12-4 loss to the reigning champions. The next round brought a visit to Huddersfield, where the Wire trailed 14-4 at half time to the Giants. However, an outstanding second half fightback and five unanswered tries secured a 33-14 Wolves win - their tenth in a row against the Huddersfield Giants in all competitions. Next up was a double fixture against Hull Kingston Rovers. Warrington successfully booked a place in the 5th Round of the 2014 Challenge Cup in their visit to the Craven Park, however five days later when they hosted the Robins at the Halliwell Jones Stadium, they lost 12-25. A modest 4 wins from the first 8 rounds of Super League.

At home to the Widnes Vikings, Warrington put on an impressive show for the Sky cameras, securing a comprehensive 44-6 win against their local derby rivals. Despite seemingly returning to form, the following two fixtures of Super League saw the Wolves slip down the ladder with back to back away defeats in the league. Castleford Tigers, the early surprise package of 2014, ended an 8 match losing streak against the Wire in style with a 40-6 win. A visit to the Odsal then brought about a shock result as the struggling Bradford Bulls utterly out-enthused the Wolves in a topsy-turvy game which culminated in a 34-28 win for the Bulls. Warrington effectively bounced back from this setback however, finding a good bit of form with a new combination of Chris Bridge and Stefan Ratchford at half-back, with Richie Myler out with a shoulder injury.

What followed was a spectacular 11-match unbeaten run in all competitions, amongst which Warrington thoroughly reasserted themselves as contenders in 2014 with impressive wins over top teams St Helens and Leeds Rhinos. At the end of July came a dip in form where Warrington suffered two consecutive Super League losses; for the second year running they were beaten away by their derby rivals Widnes and the following week saw the emphatic homecoming of Chris Riley (who played only one match for Warrington in 2014 before being sent on loan) whose hat-trick in Wakefield colours consolidated a 28-40 home loss and a drop to 6th in the table.

August arrived and the Wolves travelled to Perpignan to take on the Catalans Dragons who had only lost one of their ten home games so far in the 2014 season. After an epic battle in stormy conditions - lightning striking overhead throughout the match - Warrington snatched the win by 2 points, thanks to Bridge's faultless kicking game. Upon their return to England and Challenge Cup action, Warrington for the second year running fell at the last hurdle of the race to Wembley in a 16-24 loss to the Leeds Rhinos.

In the final four games of the regular season, the Wolves faced a string of tough games against each of what would finish the Top 5 of Super League. Firstly a Castleford side stripped down in preparation for a trip to Wembley was disposed of convincingly at the Halliwell Jones. Two weeks later Warrington took on Huddersfield and, in a fightback not quite reminiscent of the reverse fixture earlier in the season, earned a 24-all draw from 23-6 down. And with that the Wolves' ten-match winning run against the Giants became an eleven-match unbeaten run. The following week Wire produced their best 80-minute performance of the season to dispatch the league leaders St Helens 39-12 on their own patch. The final game of the regular season was a loss at Wigan in a chilling repeat of the previous year's Grand Final where Warrington took a convincing 18-4 lead only to concede four unanswered tries and eventually lose 24-20.

LEGEND
Win
Draw
Loss

Date	Competition	Rnd	Vs	H/A	Venue	R	Score	Tries	Goals	Att	TV	Report
13/02/14	Super League	1	St. Helens	H	Halliwell Jones Stadium	L	8-38	J Monaghan (2)		13,157	Sky	
21/02/14	Super League	2	Leeds	A	Headingley Stadium	L	12-18	J Monaghan, Westwood	Ratchford (2)	16,164	Sky	
02/03/14	Super League	3	Hull F.C.	H	Halliwell Jones Stadium	W	18-16	Ratchford, B Evans, Waterhouse	Ratchford (3)	10,276		
09/03/14	Super League	4	London	A	The Hive Stadium	W	44-16	R Evans (4), Atkins (2), C Bridge, Ormsby, Asotasi	Ratchford (4)	1,377		
14/03/14	Super League	5	Salford	A	AJ Bell Stadium	W	28-12	C Bridge, Higham, Ormsby, J Monaghan, Asotasi	Ratchford (4)	6,260		
20/03/14	Super League	6	Wigan	H	Halliwell Jones Stadium	L	4-12	Ormsby		11,550	Sky	
30/03/14	Super League	7	Huddersfield	A	John Smith's Stadium	W	33-14	R Evans, Myler, Westwood, Russell, Ormsby, J Monaghan	Ratchford, C Bridge (3), DG-Ratchford	7,068		
11/04/14	Super League	8	Hull Kingston Rovers	H	Halliwell Jones Stadium	L	12-25	Myler (2)	C Bridge (2)	8,778		
18/04/14	Super League	9	Widnes	H	Halliwell Jones Stadium	W	44-6	R Evans (2), O'Brien, J Monaghan, M Monaghan, C Bridge, Currie, Atkins	C Bridge (4), Ratchford (2)	10,750	Sky	
21/04/14	Super League	10	Castleford	A	Wish Communications Stadium	L	6-40	M Monaghan	Ratchford	6,853		
04/05/14	Super League	11	Bradford	A	Provident Stadium	L	28-34	England, C Bridge, Penny, J Monaghan, Russell	C Bridge (4)	6,173		
09/05/14	Super League	12	Catalans Dragons	H	Halliwell Jones Stadium	W	42-10	J Monaghan (2), England, Ratchford, C Bridge, Higham, Laithewaite	C Bridge (7)	8,816	Sky	
18/05/14	Super League	13	St. Helens	N	Etihad Stadium	W	41-24	R Evans (2), J Monaghan (2), Ormsby, Hill, Atkins, Russell	C Bridge (4), DG-Ratchford	28,213	Sky	
25/05/14	Super League	14	Wakefield Trinity	A	Rapid Solicitors Stadium	W	36-4	Currie (2), Ratchford, Atkins, Myler, Ormsby, C Bridge	C Bridge (4)	3,698		
30/05/14	Super League	15	Leeds	H	Halliwell Jones Stadium	W	24-6	C Bridge (2), Hill, J Monaghan	C Bridge (4)	10,312	Sky	
13/06/14	Super League	16	Hull Kingston Rovers	A	KC Lightstream Stadium	W	34-4	J Monaghan (2), Ormsby, Ratchford, B Evans, Atkins	C Bridge (5)	6,850		
22/06/14	Super League	17	Salford	H	Halliwell Jones Stadium	W	36-20	Ormsby, Atkins, C Bridge, J Monaghan, R Evans, Currie	C Bridge (6)	10,120		
29/06/14	Super League	18	Bradford	H	Halliwell Jones Stadium	W	50-24	O'Brien (2), J Monaghan (2), Harrison, Atkins, Westwood, Ormsby, R Evans	Ratchford (7)	9,003		
04/07/14	Super League	19	Hull F.C.	A	KC Stadium	W	24-18	Ratchford, Ormsby, Harrison, Atkins	C Bridge (4)	12,328		
13/07/14	Super League	20	London	H	Halliwell Jones Stadium	W	72-12	J Monaghan (4), Currie (3), Hill (3), Ormsby, Wood, Harrison	C Bridge (10)	9,381		
18/07/14	Super League	21	Widnes	A	The Select Security Stadium	L	14-28	Atkins, C Bridge, Currie	C Bridge	7,158	Sky	
27/07/14	Super League	22	Wakefield Trinity	H	Halliwell Jones Stadium	L	26-40	R Evans (2), J Monaghan, Ratchford, Atkins	C Bridge, Ratchford (2)	9,252		
01/08/14	Super League	23	Catalans Dragons	A	Stade Gilbert Brutus	W	26-24	M Monaghan, Ormsby, R Evans, J Monaghan	C Bridge (5)	7,000	Sky	
15/08/14	Super League	24	Castleford	H	Halliwell Jones Stadium	W	48-10	R Evans (2), Atkins, O'Brien, C Bridge, England, Ratchford, J Monaghan	C Bridge (3), Ratchford (5)	8,391	Sky	
28/08/14	Super League	25	Huddersfield	H	Halliwell Jones Stadium	D	24-24	Harrison (2), O'Brien, Atkins	O'Brien (4)	8,777	Sky	
04/09/14	Super League	26	St. Helens	A	Langtree Park	W	39-12	J Monaghan (2), Ratchford, M Monaghan, O'Brien, Myler, Atkins	Ratchford (4), O'Brien, DG-Myler	12,854	Sky	
11/09/14	Super League	27	Wigan	A	DW Stadium	L	20-24	J Monaghan (2), Myler	Ratchford (4)	15,656	Sky	

Due to the unprecedented competitiveness of this year's Super League, Warrington could have finished anywhere between 2nd and 5th in the table going into the last game of the season. As it was, Warrington let an 18-4 lead slip, losing 24-20 at the DW Stadium and dropping to 5th. The Wolves has qualified for the play-offs for the fifth year in a row but unlike the previous four years finishing outside the top 4 meant there would be no second chances; Warrington were straight into knock-out territory entering the play-offs.

Super League XIX
Pos	Team	Pld	W	D	L	PF	PA	PD	Pts	Qualification
1	St Helens (L, C)	27	19	0	8	796	563	+233	38	Play-offs
2	Wigan Warriors	27	18	1	8	834	429	+405	37	Play-offs
3	Huddersfield Giants	27	17	3	7	785	626	+159	37	Play-offs
4	Castleford Tigers	27	17	2	8	814	583	+231	36	Play-offs
5	Warrington Wolves	27	17	1	9	793	515	+278	35	Play-offs
6	Leeds Rhinos	27	15	2	10	685	421	+264	32	Play-offs
7	Catalans Dragons	27	14	1	12	733	667	+66	29	Play-offs
8	Widnes Vikings	27	13	1	13	611	725	−114	27	Play-offs
9	Hull Kingston Rovers	27	10	3	14	627	665	−38	23	
10	Salford Red Devils	27	11	1	15	608	695	−87	23	
11	Hull F.C.	27	10	2	15	653	586	+67	22	
12	Wakefield Trinity Wildcats	27	10	1	16	557	750	−193	21	
13	Bradford Bulls (R)	27	8	0	19	512	984	−472	10 (Note: Bradford Bulls deducted 6 points on 25 February 2014 for entering administration)	Relegation to Championship
14	London Broncos (R)	27	1	0	26	438	1237	−799	2	Relegation to Championship

(C) Champions; (L) League Leaders' Shield Winners; (R) Relegated

== Super League XIX – play-off series ==
Date	Competition	Rnd	Vs	H/A	Venue	R	Score	Tries	Goals	Att	TV	Report
20/09/14	Super League	Elimination Play-Off	Widnes	H	Halliwell Jones Stadium	W	22-19	J Monaghan (3), R Evans	Ratchford (3)	7,229	Sky	
25/09/14	Super League	Preliminary Semi-final	Castleford	A	Wish Communications Stadium	W	30-14	J Monaghan (2), Atkins, O'Brien	Ratchford (5)	6,219	Sky	
03/10/14	Super League	Qualifying Semi-final	Wigan	A	DW Stadium	L	12-16			15,023	Sky	

== 2014 Tetley's Challenge Cup ==
Date	Competition	Rnd	Vs	H/A	Venue	R	Score	Tries	Goals	Att	TV	Report
06/04/2014	Challenge Cup	Round 4	Hull Kingston Rovers	A	KC Lightstream Stadium	W	28-24	Atkins (2), Asotasi, Evans, J Monaghan	Bridge (4)	4,911		
27/04/2014	Challenge Cup	Round 5	Doncaster	H	Halliwell Jones Stadium	W	68-0	C Bridge (4), Penny (3), Russell, Atkins, Dwyer, J Monaghan, R Evans	C Bridge (10)	3,002		
08/06/2014	Challenge Cup	Quarter-finals	Bradford	A	Provident Stadium	W	46-10	Myler (2), J Monaghan (2), Russell, Ormsby, Currie	Bridge (7)	5,064	BBC Sport	
09/08/2014	Challenge Cup	Semi-finals	Leeds	N	Langtree Park	L	16-24	Ratchford, Westwood, C Bridge	C Bridge	12,102	BBC Sport	
