= Carville =

Carville may refer to:

== Places ==
- Carville, Calvados, Normandy, France
- Carville-la-Folletière, Seine-Maritime, Normandy, France
- Carville-Pot-de-Fer, Seine-Maritime, Normandy, France
- Carville, Louisiana, U.S
- Carville, Maryland, U.S., see Maryland and Delaware Railroad
- Carville, San Francisco, California, an historic neighborhood in the Sunset District
- Carville Hall, Brentford, UK

It may also be a misspelling of:

- Carrville, County Durham, England

== Other uses ==
- Carville (surname)
- Carville railway station, a former station in Wallsend, England

== See also ==
- Carvel (disambiguation)
