= 2012 Challenge Cup final =

Rugby league match in the United Kingdom

2012 Challenge Cup Final
Leeds Rhinos	Warrington Wolves
18	35
	1	2	Total
LEE	10	8	18
WAR	12	23	35
- Date: 25 August 2012
- Stadium: Wembley Stadium, London
- Location: London, United Kingdom
- Harry Sunderland Trophy: Brett Hodgson
- God Save The Queen and Abide with Me: Laura Wright
- Referee: Richard Silverwood
- Attendance: 79,180

Broadcast partners
- Broadcasters: BBC One

The 2012 Challenge Cup Final was the 111th cup-deciding game of the rugby league 2012 Challenge Cup Season. It was held at Wembley Stadium in London on 25 August 2012, kick off 14:30. The final was contested by the Leeds Rhinos and the Warrington Wolves. The game saw Warrington beat Leeds by 35 points to 18.

== Background ==
The 2012 Challenge Cup Final would be Leeds Rhinos third consecutive Challenge Cup Final which included a 30–6 defeat to opponents Warrington Wolves in the 2010 Final. Apart from 2010, the only other time these two sides had faced each other in the final was during the 1935–36 Challenge Cup where Leeds won 18–2. The 2012 Final would be Warrington's sixth final and Leeds's eleventh. This would be the first of two major finals these two teams would contest in the 2012 season with the teams also competing in the 2012 Super League Grand Final.

== Route to the final ==
=== Leeds Rhinos ===
As a 2011 Super League team, Leeds entered in at the fourth round, drawing Super League side Wakefield Trinity, beating them by 38 points to 18. The fifth round saw Leeds face Super League opposition again, beating Salford Red Devils, 26 points to 10. The quarter finals saw them face Championship side Leigh Centurions, thrashing them 60 points to 12. Finally, the semi-finals saw the Rhinos draw rival club, and eventual Super League league leaders, Wigan Warriors, beating them 39 points to 28.

Round	Opposition	Score
4th	Wakefield Trinity (H)	38–18
5th	Salford Red Devils (A)	26–10
QF	Leigh Centurions (A)	60–12
SF	Wigan Warriors (N)	39–28

=== Warrington Wolves ===
As a 2011 Super League team, Warrington also entered in at the fourth round. A fourth round victory over Championship side Keighley Cougars saw them progress to the fifth round where a beat Super League side Bradford Bulls 32 points to 16. The Wolves faced London Broncos in the quarter finals, thrashing them 50 points to 14. Finally, Warrington faced Huddersfield Giants in the semi-finals, thrashing them by 33 points to 8.

Round	Opposition	Score
4th	Keighley Cougars (A)	44–18
5th	Bradford Bulls (H)	32–16
QF	London Broncos (H)	50–14
SF	Huddersfield Giants (N)	33–8

== Match details ==
Saturday, 25 August
14:30

Leeds Rhinos	18 - 35	Warrington Wolves
Tries; Ian Kirke ('19); Kallum Watkins ('69, '79); Goals; Kevin Sinfield ('19, '24, '40)	Report	Tries; Joel Monaghan ('7); Trent Waterhouse ('28); Chris Riley ('49); Ryan Atkins ('55); Tyrone McCarthy ('59); Brett Hodgson ('74); Goals; Brett Hodgson ('7, '28, '55, '59, '74); Drop-goals; Lee Briers ('63)

Wembley Stadium, London
Attendance: 79,180
Referee: (England) Richard Silverwood
Player of the Match: (Australia) Brett Hodgson

Leeds Rhinos	Posit.		Warrington Wolves
Zak Hardaker	.	.	Brett Hodgson
Ben Jones-Bishop	.	.	Chris Riley
Kallum Watkins	.	.	Ryan Atkins
Carl Ablett	.	.	Stefan Ratchford
Ryan Hall	.	.	Joel Monaghan
Kevin Sinfield (c)	.	.	Lee Briers
Stevie Ward	.	.	Richie Myler
Kylie Leuluai	.	.	Garreth Carvell
Rob Burrow	.	.	Mickey Higham
Jamie Peacock	.	.	Chris Hill
Jamie Jones-Buchanan	.	.	Trent Waterhouse
Brett Delaney	.	.	Ben Westwood
Ryan Bailey	.	.	Ben Harrison
Ian Kirke	Int.		Adrian Morley (c)
Shaun Lunt	Int.		Michael Monaghan
Darrell Griffin	Int.		Paul Wood
Jimmy Keinhorst	Int.		Tyrone McCarthy
Brian McDermott	Coach		Tony Smith
