= Cardille =

Cardille is a surname. Notable people with the surname include:

- Bill Cardille (1928–2016), American broadcaster
- Lori Cardille (born 1954), American actress and producer, daughter of Bill

== See also ==
- Cardile
- Cardillo
- Carville (surname)
