= Carvel =

Carvel or Carvell may refer to:

== Places ==
- Carvel, Alberta, Canada, a hamlet west of Edmonton
- Carvel Rock (British Virgin Islands), an uninhabited islet
- Carvel Rock (United States Virgin Islands), an uninhabited islet

== People ==
- Bertie Carvel (born 1977), British actor
- Elbert N. Carvel (1910–2005), American business and politician, governor of Delaware
- Greg Carvel (born 1970), American ice hockey coach and former player
- Tom Carvel (1906–1990), Greek-born American businessman and entrepreneur, founder of the ice cream company
- Frank Broadstreet Carvell (1862-1924), Canadian lawyer, businessman, and politician
- Garreth Carvell, English professional rugby league footballer
- Jedediah Slason Carvell, Canadian businessman, politician, and office holder
- Tim Carvell, writer for TV and periodicals
- Carvell Wallace (born 1974), American writer

== Arts and entertainment ==
- Richard Carvel, an 1899 novel, or its title character
- Jessica Carvel, a fictional character in the UK television series Utopia
- Philip Carvel, a fictional character in Utopia
- Pietre Carvel, a fictional character in Utopia
- Carvel, the fictional home town of Andy Hardy in the classic film series starring Mickey Rooney
- "Carvel", first track on John Frusciante's album Shadows Collide with People

== Other uses ==
- Carvel (franchise), a United States ice cream franchise
- Carvel (boat building), a method of boat building
