= 2013 Warrington Wolves season =

- Super League XVIII Rank: 2nd
- Play-off result: Final (lost)
- 2013 record: Wins: 20; draws: 1; losses: 6
- Points scored: For: 836; against: 461

Team information
- Chairman: Steven Broomhead
- Head coach: (England) (Australia) Tony Smith
- Captain: (England) Adrian Morley
- Stadium: Halliwell Jones Stadium
- Avg. attendance: 10,875
- High attendance: 14,028 v Wigan Warriors

Top scorers
- Tries: J. Monaghan (25)
- Goals: Hodgson (65)
- Points: Hodgson (157)
← 2012	List of seasons	2014 →

The 2013 season was the Warrington Wolves' 18th season of the Super League era. Warrington lost the Challenge Cup that they held due to a loss in the semi-final against Hull FC. They also made their second successive Grand Final appearance. However, they lost 30-16 against Wigan Warriors in the final.

== Pre-season ==
Legend
Win
Draw
Loss

Warrington Wolves played two pre-season fixtures. The Wolves faced local rivals Widnes Vikings on Boxing Day and played a team mixed with youth and experience. The Wolves ran out winners by 30-22. In the final pre-season fixture the Wolves face rivals Wigan Warriors which was for Ben Westwood Testimonial. The Wolves put out a near full strength team and beat Wigan by 20-0.

Date	Competition	Rnd	Vrs	H/A	Venue	Result	Score	Tries	Goals	Att	TV	Report
26 December 2012	Friendly		Widnes Vikings	A	Stobart Stadium Halton	W	30-22	Carvell, Mendeika, Cooper, Currie, Higham	O'Brien (5)	3,696		
21 January 2013	Testimonial		Wigan Warriors	H	Halliwell Jones Stadium	W	20-0	J.Monaghan, Evams, Hodgson, Riley	Hodgson (2)	4,696		

== Super League ==
Legend
Win
Draw
Loss

Date	Competition	Rnd	Vs	H/A	Venue	R	Score	Tries	Goals	Att	TV	Report
3 February 2013	Super League	1	Castleford	H	Halliwell Jones Stadium	W	40-24	Westwood (2), Riley, Atkins, Evans, Myler, Carvell	Hodgson (5), Briers	10,721		
8 February 2013	Super League	2	Wigan	A	DW Stadium	D	17-17	J.Monaghan (2), Myler	Hodgson (2), DG- Briers	20,050	Sky Sports	
15 February 2013	Super League	3	Catalans Dragons	H	Halliwell Jones Stadium	W	24-16	J.Monaghan (2), Myler, Evans	Hodgson (4)	10,015	Sky Sports	
23 February 2013	Super League	4	Hull F.C.	A	KC Stadium	W	24-10	J.Monaghan (2), Riley (2), Higham	Hodgson (2)	10,712	Sky Sports	
3 March 2013	Super League	5	Hull Kingston Rovers	A	Craven Park	L	12-26	Ratchford, Atkins	Hodgson (2)	7,446		
8 March 2013	Super League	6	St. Helens	H	Halliwell Jones Stadium	L	10-22	Bridge (2)	Hodgson	13,381	Sky Sports	
15 March 2013	Super League	7	Salford	A	Salford City Stadium	W	46-4	Atkins (2), Riley (2), Myler (2), J.Monaghan, Hodgson	Hodgson (5), Ratchford, O'Brien	3,932		
22 March 2013	Super League	8	Huddersfield	H	Halliwell Jones Stadium	W	28-2	Ratchford (2), Riley, Hodgson	Hodgson (6)	9,797		
29 March 2013	Super League	9	Widnes	A	Stobart Stadium Halton	L	22-38	Riley (2), Evans, Myler	O'Brien (3)	9,271		
1 April 2013	Super League	10	London	H	Halliwell Jones Stadium	W	54-20	J.Monaghan (2), Williams (2), Bridge (2), Ratchford (2), Currie, Hodgson	Hodgson (7)	9,681		
7 April 2013	Super League	11	Leeds	A	Headingley Carnegie Stadium	L	22-28	J.Monaghan (2), Atkins, Myler	Hodgson (3)	15,059	Sky Sports	
14 April 2013	Super League	12	Wakefield Trinity	A	Rapid Solicitors Stadium	W	41-34	J.Monaghan (2), Ratchford (2), Atkins (2), Myler	Hodgson (6) +DG			
28 April 2013	Super League	13	Bradford	H	Halliwell Jones Stadium	W	32-4	Grix (2), Currie, Riley, J.Monaghan, Hill, Atkins	Hodgson (2)	10,901		
5 May 2013	Super League	14	Huddersfield	A	John Smith's Stadium	W	34-12	Waterhouse (2), Higham, Ratchford, Atkins, Hodgson	Hodgson (5)	8,585		
17 May 2013	Super League	15	Hull F.C.	H	Halliwell Jones Stadium	L	16-26	Grix, J.Monaghan, Atkins	Briers (2)	9,387		
25 May 2013	Super League	16	St. Helens	N	City of Manchester Stadium	W	48-22	Waterhouse (2), Riley (2), Briers, Atkins, Morley, Grix	Ratchford (8)	30,793	Sky Sports	
2 June 2013	Super League	17	Salford	H	Halliwell Jones Stadium	W	68-10	Westwood (3), J.Monaghan (2), Currie (2), Ratchford, Myler, Riley, M.Monaghan, Higham	Ratchford (10)	9,560		
8 June 2013	Super League	18	London	A	Priestfield Stadium	W	82-10	Grix (3), M.Monaghan (2), Myler (2), Atkins (2), Hill, Westwood, J.Monaghan, Ratchford, Higham	Ratchford (10), Briers	3,041		
24 June 2013	Super League	19	Wigan	H	Halliwell Jones Stadium	W	22-12	Westwood, J.Monaghan, Higham, Hill	Hodgson (3)	14,028	Sky Sports	
30 June 2013	Super League	20	Bradford	A	Provident Stadium	W	26-12	Currie, Briers, M.Monaghan, Waterhouse, Atkins	Hodgson (3)	8,485		
5 July 2013	Super League	21	Leeds	H	Halliwell Jones Stadium	W	19-18	Higham, Hodgson, Ratchford	Hodgson (3), DG- Briers	11,281	Sky Sports	
21 July 2013	Super League	22	Hull Kingston Rovers	H	Halliwell Jones Stadium	W	34-6	Hodgson, Cooper, Currie(2), Riley, M.Monaghan	Hodgson (4), Briers	10,721		
4 August 2013	Super League	23	Castleford	A	Wish Communications Stadium	W	40-30	Briers, Carvell, Dwyer, Myler, Higham(2), J.Monaghan	Ratchford(6)	5,980		
