= 2010 Challenge Cup final =

Rugby league match in the United Kingdom

2010 Challenge Cup Final
Leeds Rhinos	Warrington Wolves
6	30
	1	2	Total
LEE	0	6	6
WAR	14	16	30
- Date: 28 August 2010
- Stadium: Wembley Stadium, London
- Location: London, United Kingdom
- Harry Sunderland Trophy: Lee Briers
- God Save The Queen and Abide with Me: Camilla Kerslake
- Referee: Richard Silverwood
- Attendance: 85,217

Broadcast partners
- Broadcasters: BBC One

The 2010 Challenge Cup Final was the 109th cup-deciding game of the rugby league 2010 Challenge Cup Season. It was held at Wembley Stadium in London on 28 August 2010, kick off 14:30. The final was contested by the Leeds Rhinos and the Warrington Wolves. The game saw Warrington beat Leeds by 30 points to 6.

== Route to the final ==
=== Leeds Rhinos ===
Leeds Rhinos were drawn Super League side Hull F.C. in the fourth round, winning the match and progressing to beat third-tier side Blackpool Panthers in what would be their final year of existence. The quarter finals saw the Rhinos beat eventual league champions who they had previously lost to both times in the league. The semi-finals also saw Leeds beat St Helens who came second in this season's league.

Round	Opposition	Score
4th	Hull F.C. (A)	48–24
5th	Blackpool Panthers (H)	70–22
QF	Wigan Warriors (H)	12–20
SF	St Helens (N)	32–28

=== Warrington Wolves ===
Warrington Wolves were drawn Championship side Featherstone Rovers in the fourth round, progressing to thrash Huddersfield Giants in the fifth round. Warrington faced Bradford Bulls in the quarter finals, winning by four points, before another comfortable victory over bottom of the league Catalans Dragons.

Round	Opposition	Score
4th	Featherstone Rovers (A)	48–24
5th	Huddersfield Giants (A)	60–4
QF	Bradford Bulls (A)	26–22
SF	Catalans Dragons (N)	54–12

== Pre-match ==
This game marked the second time these sides had faced each other in the Challenge Cup Final after the 1935–36 edition where Leeds Rhinos won 18–2. At 12:35 the Schools Champions Final between Dowdales School in Dalton-in-Furness and Temple Moor High School in Leeds would occur before the main event. English singer Camilla Kerslake would also perform before the final, having previously performed at the League Cup Final earlier in the year. She sang her own music as well as The National Anthem and Abide with Me, the official anthem of the Challenge Cup and FA Cup Final.

== Match details ==
Saturday, 28 August
14:30

Leeds Rhinos
Tries
Lee Smith

Goals
Kevin Sinfield

6 – 30
Report

Warrington Wolves
Tries
Ryan Atkins (2)
Chris Hicks (3)
Louis Anderson

Goals
Ben Westwood (3)

Wembley Stadium, London
Attendance: 85,217
Referee: (England) Richard Silverwood
Player of the Match: (Wales) Lee Briers

Leeds Rhinos	Posit.		Warrington Wolves
1 Brent Webb	FB	FB	1 Richard Mathers
28 Lee Smith	CE	LW	5 Chris Hicks
3 Brett Delaney	CE	RC	3 Matt King
4 Keith Senior	CE	C	23 Ryan Atkins
5 Ryan Hall	WG	RW	2 Chris Riley
6 Danny McGuire	WG	SO	6 Lee Briers
7 Rob Burrow	SH	HK	9 Michael Monaghan
12 Ali Lauiti'iti	SR	PR	8 Adrian Morley (c)
9 Danny Buderus	HK	HK	15 Jon Clarke
16 Ryan Bailey	PR	PR	10 Garreth Carvell
21 Chris Clarkson	SR	SR	11 Louis Anderson
11 Jamie Jones-Buchanan	SR	SR	12 Ben Westwood
13 Kevin Sinfield (c)	LF	LF	13 Ben Harrison
14 Matt Diskin	Int.		16 Paul Wood
15 Greg Eastwood	Int.		26 David Solomona
17 Ian Kirke	Int.		14 Mickey Higham
18 Carl Ablett	Int.		27 Vinnie Anderson
Brian McClennan	Coach		Tony Smith

== Post match ==
Following the match, the RFL announced the game was the first sell out Challenge Cup Final since it return to the new Wembley Stadium following the stadium completion in 2007.
