= Triona (singer) =

Triona Carville
- Also known as: Triona
- Born: Catriona Carville; 7 November 1995 (age 30); Downpatrick, County Down, United Kingdom
- Genres: Pop rock
- Occupation: Singer-songwriter
- Instruments: Vocals, guitar
- Years active: 2013–present
- Website: trionamusic.co

Triona Carville is a pop rock singer-songwriter from Northern Ireland, more commonly known by her stage name "Triona". In 2014 she won the Cel Fay award for songwriter of the year and in 2016 she won the Panart's young singer-songwriter of the year.

== Early life ==
Carville has four older brothers, and her father taught her three guitar chords; soon afterwards, she began teaching herself with her father's old guitar books. She began performing solo at the age of 15 playing gigs around Northern Ireland. the first time singing publicly was at her cousins wedding. By the age of 16 she had started songwriting and was first introduced to the Panart's Belfast Nashville singer songwriters Festival.

== 2013–present ==
In 2013 at the age of 16, Carville opened for British singer songwriter and guitarist Joan Armatrading in Vicar Street, Dublin, and also featured in Armatrading's singer-songwriters documentary broadcast on BBC Radio 2.

In 2014 she played her first band performance at the Panart's Belfast Nashville festival and was one of the four chosen singer songwriters to showcase their music in Nashville, Tennessee. Triona performed in the Bluebird Cafe and on the Music City Roots show during her stay in Nashville Tennessee along with Panart's.

In 2015 Carville released her first single, a cover of Ash’s "Shining Light" which made it to number one on the Shazam charts for Northern Ireland. She is the only artist from Northern Ireland to top the Shazam chart for Northern Ireland earning her place on Cool FM’s top seven at seven for a number of consecutive weeks. Her version of "Shining Light" also featured on the 2015 Power NI electricity's television and radio campaign. In 2015 Triona toured and opened for Westlife’s former band member Brian McFadden on his UK and Ireland tour. She was also invited by Northern Irish Singer Songwriter Van Morrison to open for him at his show in the 3Arena, Dublin. Triona also had the privilege of playing alongside top artists Kodaline, Gabrielle Aplin, Gavin James, Hudson Taylor and The Coronas at the 2015 Christmas Ruby sessions in Dublin.

In 2016 Carville toured and opened for Liverpool-born country singer Nathan Carter on his “Stayin’ up all night” tour around the UK and Ireland and also opened for Carter at his Concerts in the London Palladium and Live at the Marquee, Cork to 5000 people.

== Discography ==
Solo EP

- Triona ‘Live On Tour’ (2016)
