= Carville (name) =

Carville is originally a Normandy place name, which is a toponymic compound of Old French -ville "farm" (see villain, villein) and the Old Norse and Old Danish personal name Kári. Notable people with the name include:

== Surname ==
- Allan Carville, New Zealand footballer
- Audrey Carville, Irish journalist
- Daragh Carville (born 1969), Irish playwright and screenwriter
- Edward P. Carville (1945–1947), American politician
- James Carville (born 1944), American political consultant
- Rory Carville, Irish chef
- Triona Carville, full name of Triona (singer) (born 1995), Irish singer-songwriter

== Given name ==
- A. Carville Foster Jr. (born 1932), American politician
- Carville Benson (1872–1929), American politician
