= Trent Waterhouse =

Australia international rugby league footballer

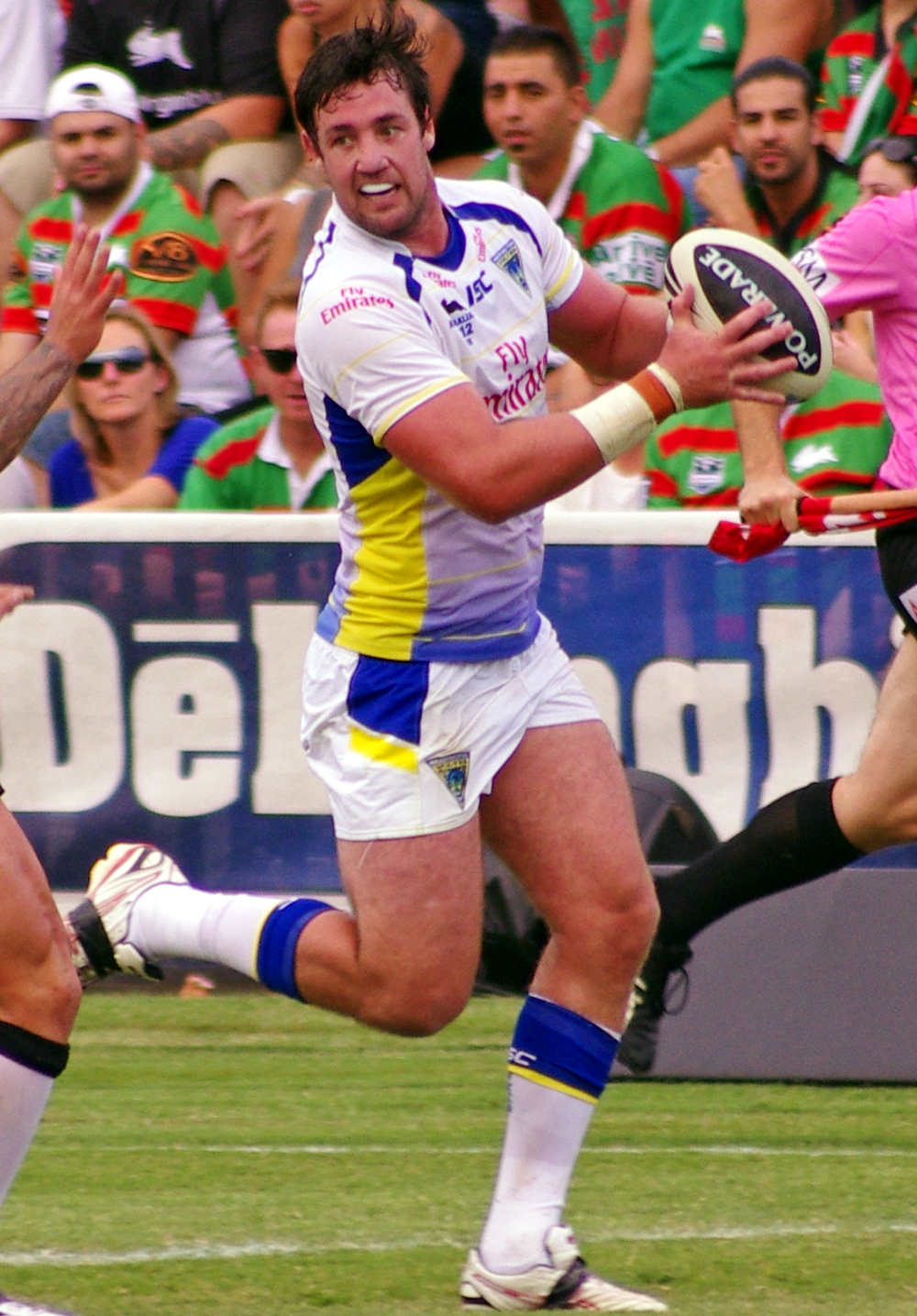

Personal information
- Born: 8 January 1981 (age 45) Paddington, New South Wales, Australia

Playing information
- Height: 194 cm (6 ft 4 in)
- Weight: 110 kg (17 st 5 lb)
- Position: Second-row, Lock
Club
Years	Team	Pld	T	G	FG	P
2002–11	Penrith Panthers	187	39	1	0	158
2012–14	Warrington Wolves	59	18	0	0	72
	Total	246	57	1	0	230
Representative
Years	Team	Pld	T	G	FG	P
2006–10	NSW City	3	0	0	0	0
2004–10	New South Wales	5	0	0	0	0
2003–09	Australia	12	3	0	0	12
2006	Prime Minister's XIII	1	0	0	0	0
2012	Exiles	1	0	0	0	0

Trent Waterhouse (born 8 January 1981), also known by the nickname of "House", is an Australian professional rugby league footballer who plays as a second-row forward for the Thirroul Butchers in the Illawarra Rugby League. He has previously played for the Penrith Panthers in the National Rugby League and Warrington Wolves of the Super League in Europe, England . He has also represented City Origin, New South Wales and Australia.

== Background ==
Waterhouse was born in Paddington, New South Wales, Australia.

== Playing career ==
After playing junior football for Cambridge Park and Emu Plains JRLFC, Waterhouse made his first grade début against Melbourne Storm at Olympic Park on 17 August 2002 in round 23, which was also the same game in which Steve Turner debuted. He was a member of the Penrith 2003 NRL grand final-winning team in their 18–6 win over Sydney Roosters.

After that he went on the 2003 Kangaroo tour of Great Britain and France, helping Australia to victory over Great Britain in what would be the last time the two nations contested an Ashes series. Waterhouse would play a total of ten internationals from then till to 2005.

As 2003 NRL premiers, the Penrith club travelled to England to face Super League VIII champions, the Bradford Bulls in the 2004 World Club Challenge. Waterhouse played at lock forward in Penrith's 22–4 loss. In February 2007, Waterhouse signed with the Panthers until the end of 2011. In the same year, Penrith finished last on the table and claimed the wooden spoon.

He was selected for City in the City vs Country match in 2006 and again in 2009.

Waterhouse made his state representative début in the 2004 State of Origin series, playing in games I and II off the bench for the New South Wales Blues. Selected again in 2009, Waterhouse was sent-off after coming into a fight between Steve Price and Brett White during game III of the State of Origin series. He became the first Blues player to be dismissed from an Origin game, and the first since Gorden Tallis to be sent off in an Origin match. His dismissal capped off a horror year for NSW as they lost their fourth (of eight) straight Origin series.

On 29 June 2011 it was announced Waterhouse had signed to join English Super League club Warrington from 2012 on a three-year deal.

Waterhouse played in the 2012 Challenge Cup Final victory over the Leeds Rhinos at Wembley Stadium, scoring a try in the first half.

He played in the 2012 Super League Grand Final defeat by the Leeds Rhinos at Old Trafford.

He signed to the Thirroul Butchers in the Illawarra Rugby League for the 2015 season.
