= Ben Evans (rugby league) =

Wales international rugby league footballer

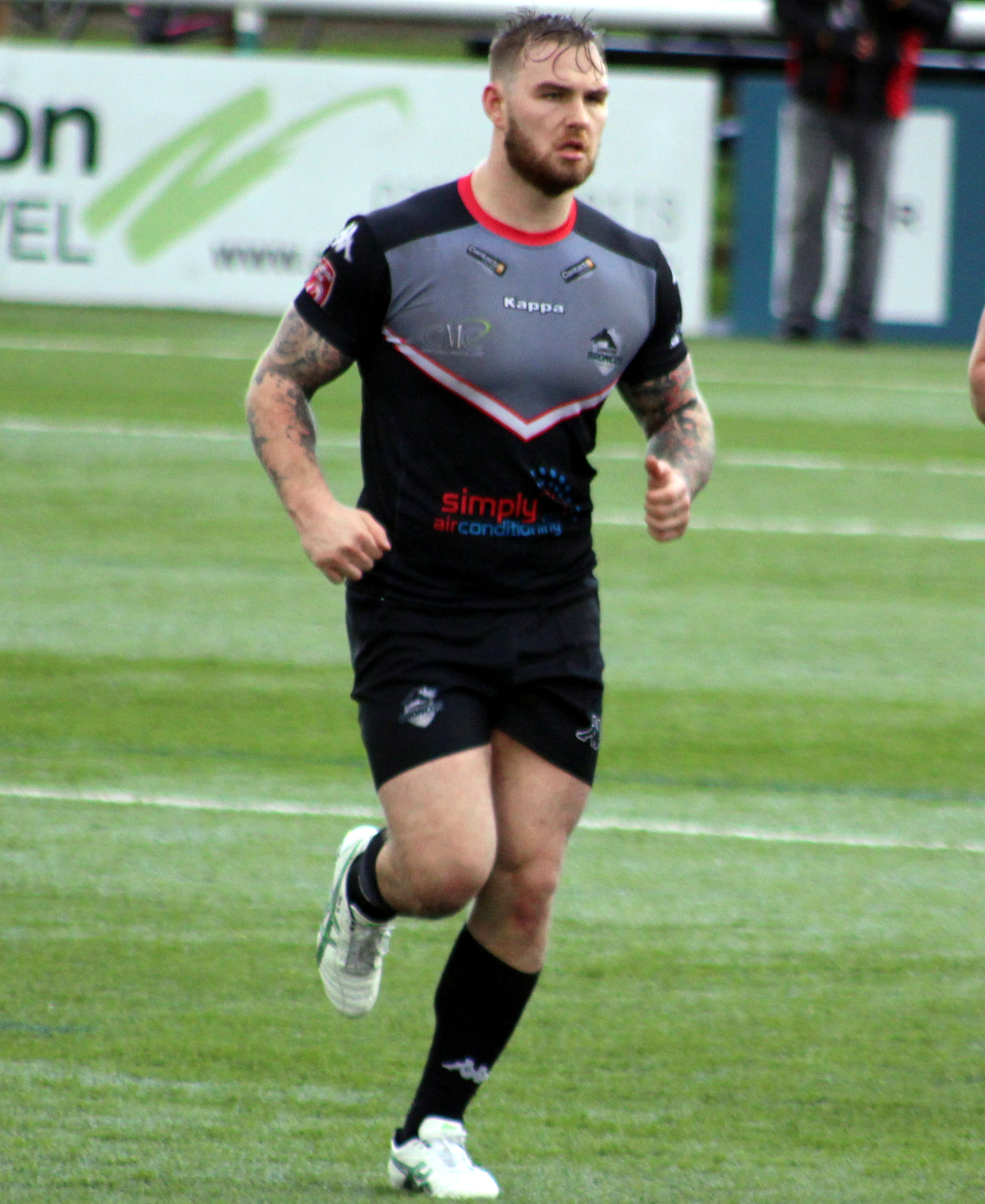

Personal information
- Full name: Benjamin Evans
- Born: 30 October 1992 (age 33) Bridgend, Wales
- Height: 6 ft 2 in (1.88 m)
- Weight: 17 st 5 lb (110 kg)

Playing information
- Position: Prop
Club
Years	Team	Pld	T	G	FG	P
2011–16	Warrington Wolves	21	2	0	0	8
2013(loan)	→ Bradford Bulls	17	1	0	0	4
2016(loan)	→ Leigh Centurions	3	0	0	0	0
2016(loan)	→ Rochdale Hornets	3	0	0	0	0
2017–18	London Broncos	43	10	0	0	40
2019–20	Toulouse Olympique	23	1	0	0	4
2021–22	Bradford Bulls	37	5	0	0	20
2023	Barrow Raiders	6	1	0	0	4
2024–25	North Wales Crusaders	20	5	0	0	20
	Total	173	25	0	0	100
Representative
Years	Team	Pld	T	G	FG	P
2012–25	Wales	12	3	0	0	12
- Source: As of 29 July 2026
- Education: Brynteg Comprehensive School
- Relatives: Rhys Evans (brother)

Ben Evans (born 30 October 1992), also known by the nickname of "Bev", is a Welsh former professional rugby league footballer who last played as a prop for the North Wales Crusaders in the RFL League 1 and Wales at international level.

He is the current CEO of North Wales Crusaders, appointed in July 2026.

He has previously played for the Warrington Wolves in the Super League, and on loan from Warrington at Bradford in the top flight, at the Leigh Centurions in the Championship and the Rochdale Hornets in League 1. Evans has also played for the London Broncos and Toulouse Olympique in the Championship.

== Background ==
Evans was born in Bridgend, Wales.

He is the twin brother of the rugby league footballer; Rhys Evans.

== Playing career ==
=== Warrington Wolves ===
Evans signed for Warrington alongside his twin brother Rhys Evans, and progressed through the youth system, appearing for the first-team in several pre-season friendlies but never in a competitive match.

2014 Evans featured in round 1 against St. Helens to round 5 Salford. He then featured in round 7 against Huddersfield and then in round 9 Widnes to round 17 Salford. Evans featured in round 4 Hull Kingston Rovers to the Quarter Final against Bradford in the Challenge Cup.

2015 He featured in round 2 Hull F.C. and then in round 4 Hull Kingston Rovers to round 6 against St Helens.

=== Bradford Bulls ===
In 2013 he was offered the chance to go to another Super League side on loan, Bradford Bulls. Ben signed a 1-year loan deal with Bradford before pre-season started in time for the 2013 season. However, his début was delayed as a hip injury ruled him out for the start of the season.

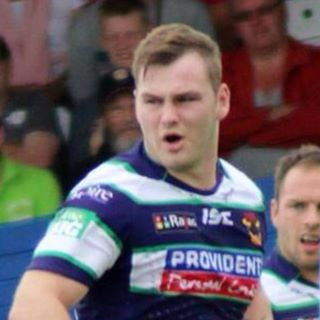
Evans playing for the Bradford Bulls in 2013

He left at the end of the season to return to his parent club Warrington where he has played this season repeatedly and scored 1 try.

=== London Broncos ===
In 2016, Evans found himself at the bottom of the pecking order at Warrington not playing a Super League game all season. He played 3 games on loan to Leigh Centurions, and also on loan for 2 games for Rochdale Hornets.

On 16 October 2016, Evans signed for the London Broncos for the 2017 season.

=== North Wales Crusaders ===
On 8 Dec 2023 it was reported that he had signed for North Wales Crusaders in the RFL League 1

== International career ==
Having represented Wales at youth level, in 2012 Ben was called up by the senior squad to play in the 2012 Autumn International Series. He made his international début in a 20–6 defeat by France, and made a further appearance against England that year. He made his international début before making a first-team appearance at club level.

He was selected in Wales 2013 Rugby League World Cup squad. He featured in the 32–16 defeat by Italy and in the 16–24 defeat by the United States. He scored against Italy (1 try).

He was selected in the Wales 9s squad for the 2019 Rugby League World Cup 9s.

== Statistics ==
Season	Appearances	Tries	Goals	F/G	Points
2013 Bradford Bulls	17	1	0	0	4
2021 Bradford Bulls	19	5	0	0	20
2022 Bradford Bulls	18	0	0	0	0
Total	54	6	0	0	24
