= 2012 Super League Grand Final =

Leeds Rhinos	Warrington Wolves
26	18
	1	2	Total
LEE	14	12	26
WAR	14	4	18
- Date: 6 October 2012
- Stadium: Old Trafford
- Location: (England) Manchester
- Harry Sunderland Trophy: (England) Kevin Sinfield ( Leeds Rhinos)
- Jerusalem: Hayley Westenra
- Referee: Richard Silverwood
- Attendance: 70,676

Broadcast partners
- Broadcasters: Sky Sports
- Commentators: Eddie Hemmings; Mike Stephenson; Phil Clarke, Brian Carney

The 2012 Super League Grand Final was the 15th official grand final and conclusive and championship-deciding match of the Super League XVII season. The match was held on Saturday 6 October 2012, at Old Trafford, Manchester, and was contested by English clubs Leeds Rhinos and Warrington Wolves. The 2012 Grand Final was a repeat of the 2012 Challenge Cup Final, in which Warrington beat Leeds 35-18 at Wembley Stadium, although it was Leeds who would win the Super League Grand Final, winning 26-18.

The progress of the two teams competing in the match were decided by results in the Super League XVII play-offs.

== Background ==
Pos	Team	Pld	W	D	L	PF	PA	PD	Pts
2	Warrington Wolves	27	20	1	6	909	539	+370	41
5	Leeds Rhinos	27	16	0	11	823	622	+209	32

=== Route to the Final ===
==== Leeds Rhinos ====
As in 2011, Leeds Rhinos finished the regular season in 5th place, meaning the team started their play-off campaign in the elimination play-off, where they met West Yorkshire rivals Wakefield Trinity Wildcats, playing in their first play-off campaign at Headingley Carnegie Stadium. Leeds won the game 42-20 with Ben Jones-Bishop scoring a hat-trick and Danny McGuire becoming the all-time leading try-scorer in the Super League history.

In the Preliminary Semi Final, Leeds would meet the lowest-placed loser from the Qualification play-off games, Catalans Dragons in the south of France, who they would beat 27-20, thanks to five goals from Kevin Sinfield and a drop goal from McGuire. That result booked Leeds' place in the Qualifying Semi-Final and the club call. Wigan Warriors were the team that were given the decision and chose Leeds. The match at the DW Stadium was won 13-12 by Leeds, despite Wigan scoring more tries (two to Leeds' one). Leeds reached the Grand Final, thanks to the boot of Kevin Sinfield, who kicked four goals, including the conversion to Kallum Watkins' try, and a first-half drop goal.

Leeds
Round	Opposition	Score
Elimination Play-Off	Wakefield Trinity (H)	42-20
Preliminary Semi-Final	Catalans Dragons (A)	27-20
Semi-Final	Wigan Warriors (A)	13-12
Key: (H) = Home venue; (A) = Away venue.

==== Warrington Wolves ====
Warrington's 2012 play-off campaign did not get off to a good start, as they lost 28-6 to St. Helens, despite having home advantage in the Qualifying play-off game following their 2nd place league finish. Tommy Makinson was Saints's most influential player in the game, scoring 16 points from two tries and kicking four goals.

The defeat meant Warrington would have to compete in the Preliminary Semi-Final round but would once again play at home at the Halliwell Jones Stadium, this time against Hull FC. Warrington would race into a 24-point lead before winning the 24-12 to reach the Preliminary Semi Final. Following Wigan's club call decision, Warrington were re-united against St Helens, this time at Langtree Park. The reverse of the fixture also meant a reverse of luck for Warrington, who would gain revenge for the defeat earlier in the play-offs by winning 36-18 to reach their ever Grand Final. It also sees coach Tony Smith become the first coach to reach the Super Grand Final with two different clubs, the other club being Warrington's opponent, Leeds Rhinos.

Warrington
Round	Opposition	Score
Qualifying Play-Off	St Helens (H)	28-6
Preliminary Semi-Final	Hull F.C. (H)	24-12
Semi-Final	St Helens (A)	36-18
Key: (H) = Home venue; (A) = Away venue.

== Match details ==
6 October 2012
18:00 BST

Leeds Rhinos	26–18	Warrington Wolves
Tries; Sinfield 18'; Jones-Bishop 28'; Ablett 60'; Hall 71'; Goals; Sinfield 18', 24', 28', 60', 71'	Report	Tries; Myler 3'; J.Monaghan 37'; Atkins 45'; Goals; Hodgson 3', 37', 40'

Old Trafford, Manchester
Attendance: 70,676
Referee: Richard Silverwood
Player of the Match: Kevin Sinfield

Leeds Rhinos		Position	Warrington Wolves	
4	(England) Zak Hardaker	Fullback	1	(Australia) Brett Hodgson
2	(England) Ben Jones-Bishop	Winger	5	(Australia) Joel Monaghan
3	(England) Kallum Watkins	centre	19	(England) Stefan Ratchford
12	(England) Carl Ablett	centre	4	(England) Ryan Atkins
5	(England) Ryan Hall	Winger	2	(England) Chris Riley
13	(England) Kevin Sinfield (c)	Stand Off	6	(Wales) Lee Briers
6	(England) Danny McGuire	scrum-half	7	(England) Richie Myler
8	(New Zealand) Kylie Leuluai	prop	20	(England) Chris Hill
7	(England) Rob Burrow	Hooker	14	(England) Mickey Higham
10	(England) Jamie Peacock	prop	13	(England) Ben Harrison
11	(England) Jamie Jones-Buchanan	2nd Row	11	(Australia) Trent Waterhouse
15	(Australia) Brett Delaney	2nd Row	12	(England) Ben Westwood
16	(England) Ryan Bailey	loose forward	15	(Ireland) Simon Grix
17	(England) Ian Kirke	Interchange	8	(England) Adrian Morley (c)
20	(England) Darrell Griffin	Interchange	9	(Australia) Michael Monaghan
25	(England) Stevie Ward	Interchange	16	(England) Paul Wood
31	(England) Shaun Lunt	Interchange	17	(England) Michael Cooper
	(England) Brian McDermott	Coach		(Australia) Tony Smith
