= Rhys Evans (rugby league) =

Wales international rugby league footballer

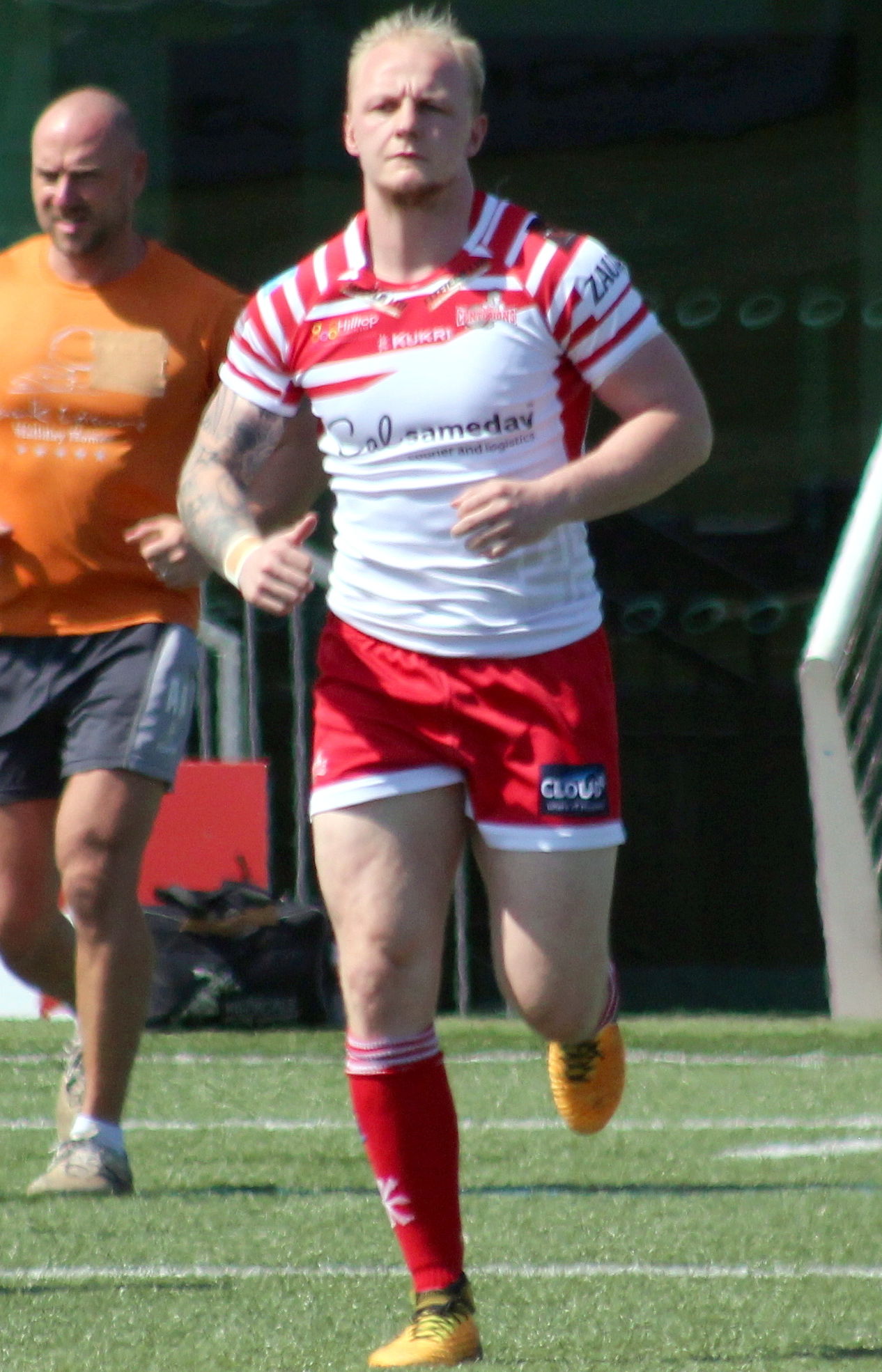

Personal information
- Born: 30 October 1992 (age 33) Bridgend, Wales
- Height: 6 ft 0 in (1.84 m)
- Weight: 14 st 9 lb (93 kg)

Playing information
- Position: Wing, Centre
Club
Years	Team	Pld	T	G	FG	P
2010–17	Warrington Wolves	105	45	1	0	182
2011(loan)	→ Leigh Centurions	8	3	1	0	14
2013(loan)	→ Swinton Lions	4	1	0	0	4
2014(loan)	→ Swinton Lions	4	1	0	0	4
2015(loan)	→ N Wales Crusaders	1	1	0	0	4
2018	Leigh Centurions	17	4	0	0	16
2019–22	Bradford Bulls	54	13	0	0	52
2020(loan)	→ Leeds Rhinos	5	1	0	0	4
	Total	198	69	2	0	280
Representative
Years	Team	Pld	T	G	FG	P
2012	England Knights	2	2	0	0	8
2013–22	Wales	3	0	0	0	0
- Source: As of 8 November 2022
- Education: Brynteg Comprehensive School
- Relatives: Ben Evans (brother)

Rhys Evans (born 1992) is a former professional rugby league footballer who played as a wing, centre or fullback mostly recently for the Bradford Bulls in the Championship. He has played for both the England Knights and Wales at international level.

He has previously played for the Warrington Wolves in the Super League, and on loan from Warrington at the Leigh Centurions, Swinton Lions and the North Wales Crusaders. He has also played for Leigh in the Championship, and also on loan from Bradford at the Leeds Rhinos in the Super League.

== Background ==
Evans was born in Bridgend, Wales.

He is the twin brother of fellow Wales international Ben Evans.

== Early career ==
Both he and his brother were noticed by scouts of numerous Super League clubs while representing their secondary school, Brynteg Comprehensive School, in the National Schools Rugby League final on two separate occasions, 2004 and 2005.

Although he had been brought up in an area dominated by rugby union, and playing junior rugby for Tondu RFC, he and his brother accepted a scholarship with Warrington and moved there as teenagers.

He played seven Super League matches in his first season, scoring a try in his debut game against Leeds.

== Domestic career ==
Evans made his Warrington debut in 2010.

In the 2014 season, Evans scored 16 tries playing on the wing. However, his game time was restricted in 2015 through multiple injuries.

In 2016, Evans has begun the season playing at centre, scoring 2 tries against the Catalans Dragons in a 30–20 win.

He played in the 2016 Challenge Cup Final defeat by Hull F.C. at Wembley Stadium.

He played in the 2016 Super League Grand Final defeat by the Wigan Warriors at Old Trafford.

In June 2017 Evans signed a three-year deal to join Leigh from the start of the 2018 season.

On 30 September 2020 it was announced that Evans would return to Bradford for the 2021 season, after the 2020 Leeds loan deal ended

He retired from rugby in 2022.

== International career ==
Having represented Wales at youth level, Evans made his Wales début in their opening match of the 2013 Rugby League World Cup.

He was selected in the Wales 9s squad for the 2019 Rugby League World Cup 9s.
