= Ryan Atkins =

England international rugby league footballer

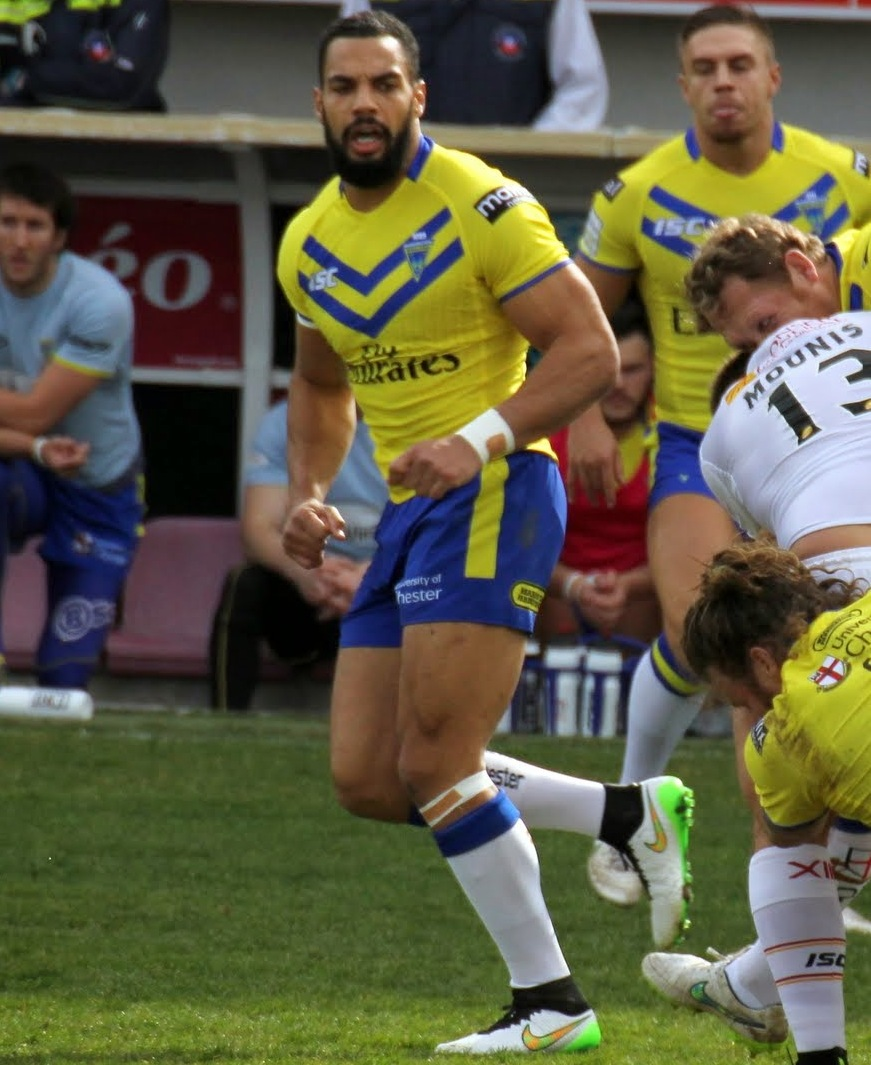

Personal information
- Full name: Ryan Atkins
- Born: 7 October 1985 (age 40) Swinnow, West Yorkshire, England

Playing information
- Height: 6 ft 1 in (1.85 m)
- Weight: 15 st 9 lb (99 kg)
- Position: Centre
Club
Years	Team	Pld	T	G	FG	P
2005–06	Bradford Bulls	1	0	0	0	0
2006(loan)	→ Wakefield Trinity Wildcats	19	9	0	0	36
2006–09	Wakefield Trinity Wildcats	77	40	0	0	160
2010–19	Warrington Wolves	273	168	0	0	672
2019–20	Wakefield Trinity	5	2	0	0	8
2021	York City Knights	19	8	0	0	32
	Total	394	227	0	0	908
Representative
Years	Team	Pld	T	G	FG	P
2006–12	England	8	4	0	0	16

Ryan Atkins (born 7 October 1985) is an English former professional rugby league footballer who most recently played as a centre for York City Knights in the Championship and formerly England at international level.

He previously played for the Bradford Bulls in the Super League, and on loan from Bradford at the Wakefield Trinity Wildcats in the top flight. Atkins joined the Wakefield Trinity Wildcats on a permanent deal and later joined the Warrington Wolves in the Super League.

== Background ==
Atkins was born in Pudsey, West Yorkshire, England. He played rugby league for his local team Stanningley and rugby union for Bramley Phoenix.

== Playing career ==
=== Bradford ===
Atkins began his career with Bradford but failed to make a first-team appearance before joining Wakefield Trinity midway through 2006's Super League XI.

=== Warrington ===
He signed for Warrington on a three-year deal in September 2009, following Richie Myler from Salford City Reds.

Atkins played for Warrington in the 2010 Challenge Cup Final victory over Leeds.

Atkins played in the 2012 Challenge Cup Final victory over Leeds at Wembley Stadium.

Atkins played in the 2012 Super League Grand Final defeat by Leeds at Old Trafford. Atkins played in the 2013 Super League Grand Final defeat by Wigan at Old Trafford. Atkins played in the 2016 Challenge Cup Final defeat by Hull F.C. at Wembley Stadium. Atkins played in the 2016 Super League Grand Final defeat by Wigan at Old Trafford.

=== York City Knights ===
On 15 September 2020, it was announced that Atkins would join York City Knights for the 2021 season.

On 13 November 2020 the RFL announced a three-month ban for Atkins for placing a bet on former club Wakefield Trinity. Atkins retired at the end of the 2021 season.

== International career ==
His impressive club form earned him a call-up and was named in the England training squad for the 2008 Rugby League World Cup.

== Honours ==
League Leaders' Shield: 2

2011, 2016

Challenge Cup: 2

2010, 2012
