= Jon Clarke (rugby league) =

GB international rugby league footballer

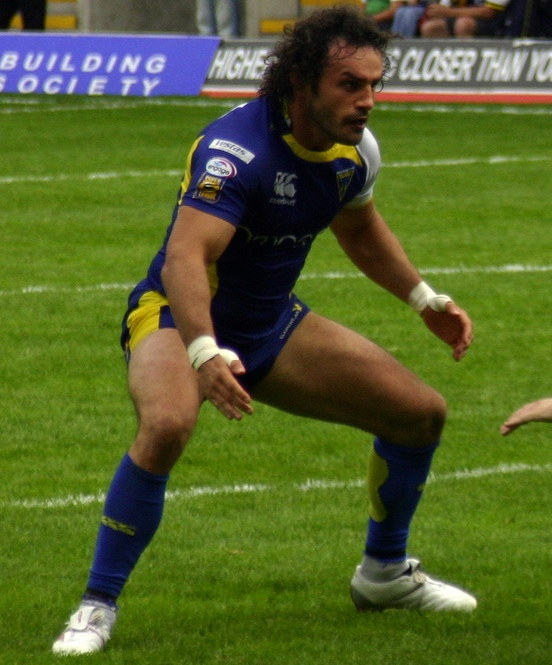

Personal information
- Full name: Jonathan Clarke
- Born: 4 April 1979 (age 47) Lowton, near Leigh, England

Playing information
- Height: 5 ft 11 in (1.80 m)
- Weight: 15 st 6 lb (98 kg)
- Position: Hooker
Club
Years	Team	Pld	T	G	FG	P
1997–99	Wigan Warriors	28	5	0	0	20
2000–01	London Broncos	30	2	0	0	8
2001–11	Warrington Wolves	234	69	72	0	420
2012–14	Widnes Vikings	67	6	0	0	16
	Total	359	82	72	0	464
Representative
Years	Team	Pld	T	G	FG	P
2007	Great Britain	3	0	0	0	0

Jon Clarke (born 4 April 1979) is an English former professional rugby league player who played as a hooker. Jon is currently Head of Performance at Manly-Warringah Sea Eagles in the NRL.He was previously the strength & conditioning coach for the England and British & Irish Lions rugby union teams. He played for the Wigan Warriors, London Broncos, Warrington Wolves and Widnes Vikings.

== Playing career ==
He represented Great Britain Academy as captain whilst coming through the junior ranks at Wigan Warriors, he played in their 1997 Premiership Final winning side against St. Helens. He followed his Wigan Warriors coach John Monie to the London Broncos in 2000, but returned north in 2001 when the Warrington Wolves were forced to sign a hooker on loan to solve an injury crisis.

Generally used as Warrington Wolves' starting hooker, he was Super League's most effective tackler in 2004 with a 99% success rate, and was fourth-highest tackler in the competition in 2005.

In June 2007, Clarke was called up to the Great Britain squad for the Test match against France.

The Warrington Wolves fans voted him 'Greatest Hooker' in the club's history, beating John Thursfield and Mark Roskell into 2nd and 3rd place.

He was forced to rule himself out contention for the England training squad for the 2008 Rugby League World Cup through injury.

Clarke played in the 2010 Challenge Cup Final victory over the Leeds Rhinos at Wembley Stadium.

It was announced on 6 September 2011 that Clarke would be joining Widnes Vikings in their forthcoming return to Super League.

== Coaching career ==
Clarke retired at the end of the 2014 season, and joined the coaching staff at Widnes.

Clarke was on the coaching staff of England RU at the 2019 Rugby World Cup in Japan. He was a strength and conditioning coach on the 2021 British & Irish Lions tour to South Africa.

On 28 Nov 2023 it was reported that he had taken up a role as head of performance at the Manly-Warringah Sea Eagles
