= Mickey Higham =

Former Great Britain and England international rugby league footballer

Micky Higham
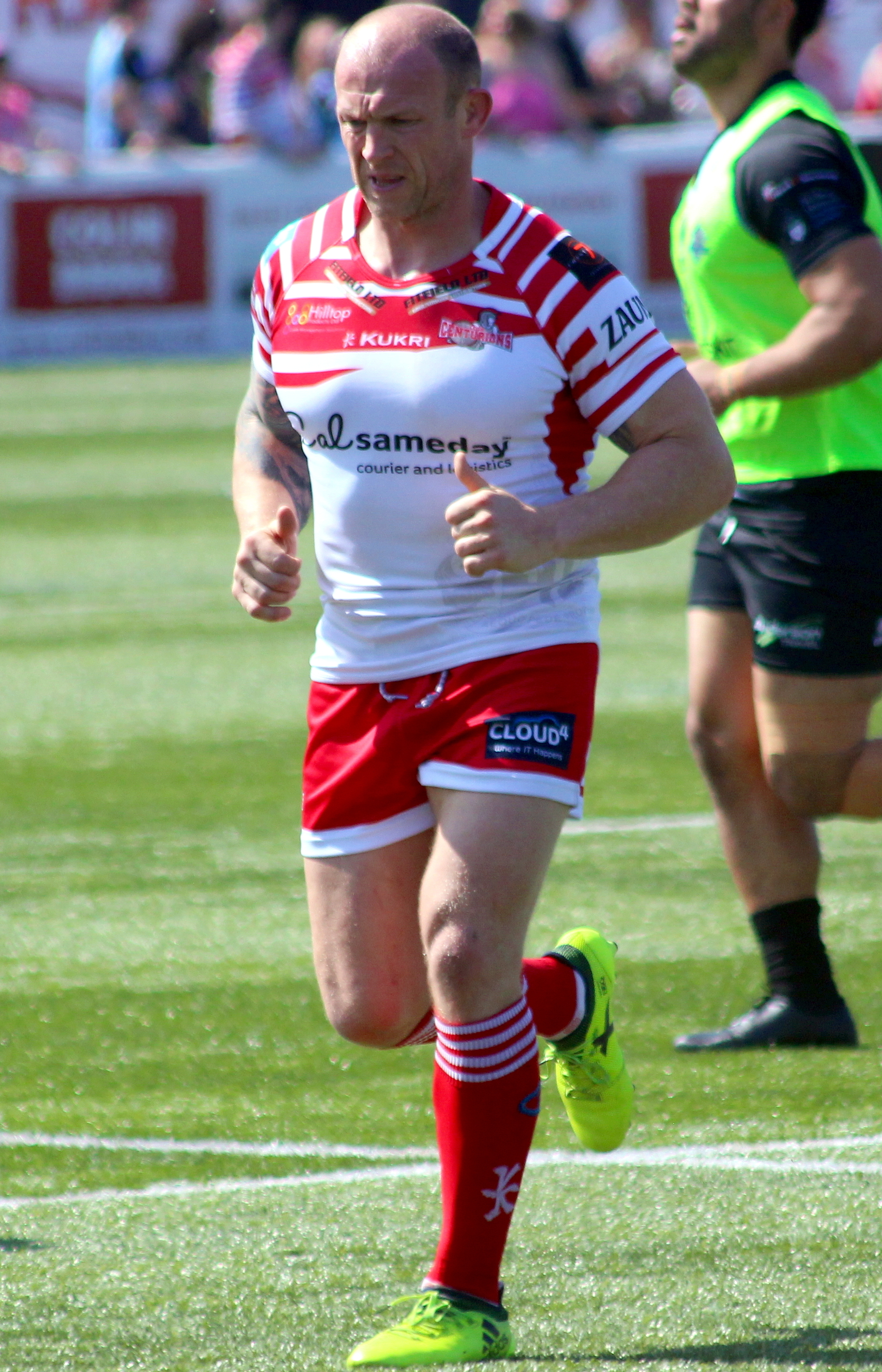

Personal information
- Full name: Michael Higham
- Born: 18 September 1980 (age 46) Billinge Higher End, Wigan, England

Playing information
- Height: 5 ft 8 in (1.73 m)
- Weight: 13 st 8 lb (86 kg)
- Position: Hooker
Club
Years	Team	Pld	T	G	FG	P
1999–00	Leigh Centurions	42	24	0	0	96
2001–05	St Helens	116	35	0	0	140
2006–08	Wigan Warriors	97	17	0	0	68
2009–15	Warrington Wolves	175	37	0	0	148
2015–17	Leigh Centurions	61	14	0	0	56
2018–19	Leigh Centurions	51	2	0	0	8
	Total	542	129	0	0	516
Representative
Years	Team	Pld	T	G	FG	P
2004–05	Great Britain	4	0	0	0	0
2008–09	England	4	1	0	0	4

Mickey Higham (born 18 September 1980) is an English former professional rugby league footballer who played as a hooker in the 1990s, 2000s, and 2010s.

He played for the Leigh Centurions in three separate spells in the Super League and Championship. Higham also played for St Helens, Wigan Warriors and the Warrington Wolves in the top flight. He played for both Great Britain and England at international level.

== Background ==
Higham was born in Billinge Higher End, Wigan, England.

== Playing career ==
=== Leigh Centurions ===
Higham joined St Helens from Leigh in November 2000.

=== St Helens ===
Higham played for St. Helens from the interchange bench in their 2002 Super League Grand Final victory against Bradford Bulls. Having won Super League VI, St Helens contested the 2003 World Club Challenge against 2002 NRL Premiers, Sydney Roosters. Higham played from the interchange bench in Saints' 38–0 loss.

He suffered an ankle injury which ruled him out of most of 2004's Super League IX. He'd made over 100 appearances for St Helens, scoring 33 tries.

=== Wigan Warriors ===
Higham joined Wigan in October 2005 after a transfer deal involving three clubs, and fellow hooker Terry Newton. Higham was unable to join Wigan directly as his club, St. Helens, would not sell. However, Bradford Bulls stepped in and bought Higham from Saints for £70,000 and then immediately released him to Wigan. In exchange, Wigan allowed Terry Newton to join Bradford. Higham signed a three-year deal with Wigan and commented: "It looked at one stage as though I would be playing next season at Bradford but when the opportunity to join Wigan came up at the last minute I jumped at it." At Wigan, Higham again teamed up with coach Ian Millward who he had played under at both Leigh and St Helens. Millward was however sacked by Wigan in April 2006 and Higham, ironically, was coached by Brian Noble who was Bradford coach at the time of the "three-club transfer". Higham's contract at Wigan was not renewed, and he subsequently signed for Warrington on a two-year deal.

=== Warrington Wolves ===
Higham enjoyed a successful spell with the Wolves making 174 appearances and was a fans favourite throughout his time at the club.

Higham played in the 2010 Challenge Cup Final victory over the Leeds Rhinos at Wembley Stadium.

He played in the 2012 Challenge Cup Final victory over the Leeds Rhinos at Wembley Stadium.

He played in the 2012 Super League Grand Final defeat by the Leeds Rhinos at Old Trafford.

He played in the 2013 Super League Grand Final defeat by the Wigan Warriors at Old Trafford.

=== Leigh ===
Higham then returned to his first club Leigh for £50,000 on 20 May 2015.

On 11 September 2019 Higham announced his retirement to join the Leigh coaching staff

=== International career ===
He made his Great Britain début in the 2004 Gillette Tri-Nations against New Zealand, after recovering from an ankle injury which ruled him out of most of 2004's Super League IX.

In September 2008, he was named in the England training squad for the 2008 Rugby League World Cup, and in October 2008 he was named in the final 24-man England squad. He was named in the England team to face Wales at the Keepmoat Stadium, Doncaster, prior to England's departure for the 2008 Rugby League World Cup. He made his England début in the victory over Wales on 10 October 2008.
