= Michael Monaghan =

Australian rugby league coach and former rugby league footballer

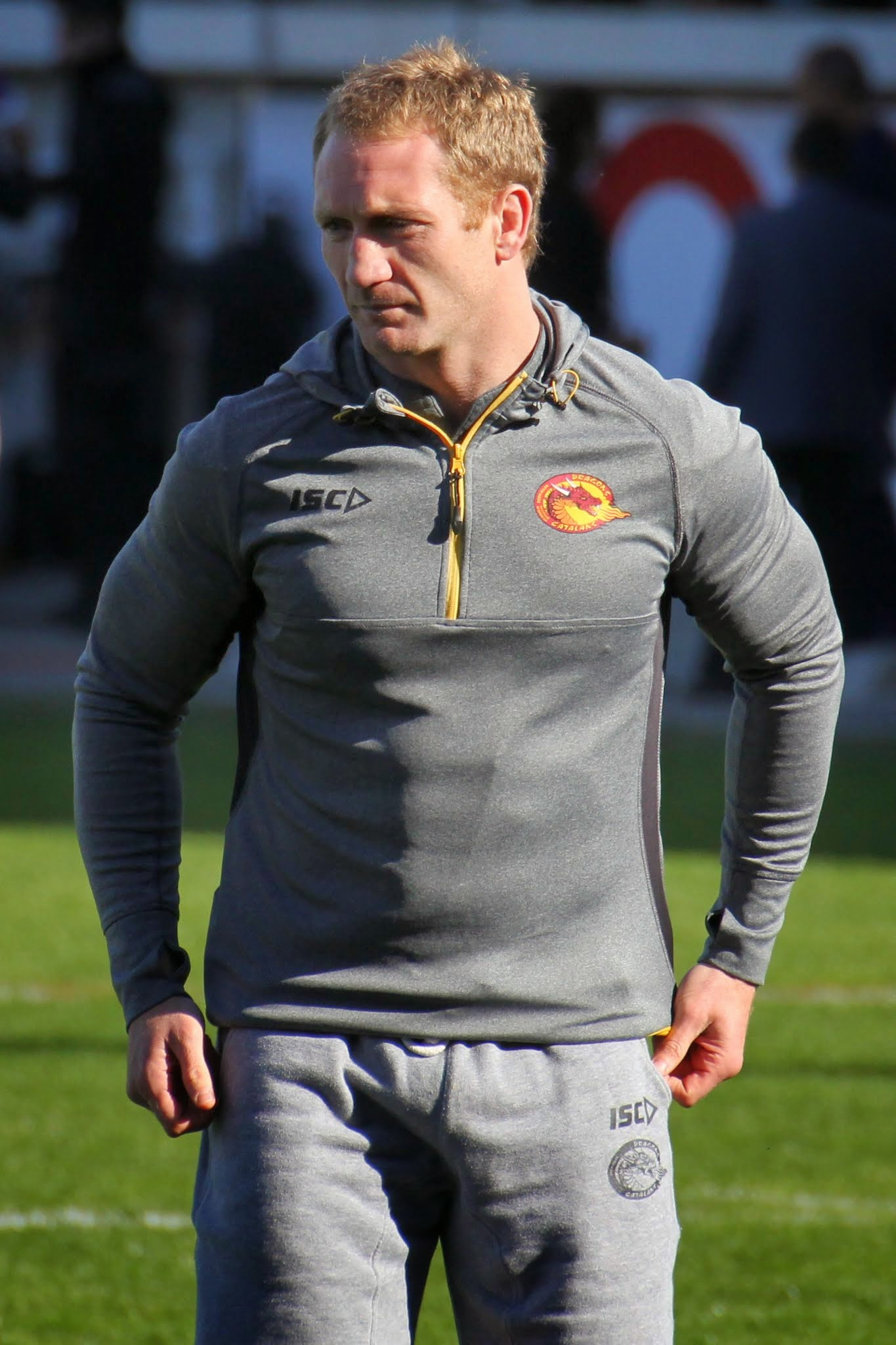

Personal information
- Born: 13 May 1980 (age 46) Canberra, ACT, Australia

Playing information
- Height: 179 cm (5 ft 10 in)
- Weight: 87 kg (13 st 10 lb)
- Position: Hooker, Halfback
Club
Years	Team	Pld	T	G	FG	P
2001–03	Canberra Raiders	31	7	0	1	29
2004–07	Manly Sea Eagles	95	17	2	7	79
2008–14	Warrington Wolves	167	17	0	2	70
	Total	293	41	2	10	178
- Relatives: Joel Monaghan (brother)

Michael Monaghan (born 13 May 1980) is the current assistant coach at the Gold Coast Titans in the National Rugby League and an Australian former professional rugby league footballer who played for the Canberra Raiders and Manly-Warringah Sea Eagles in the National Rugby League, and for the Warrington Wolves in the Super League.

== Background ==
He is the brother of former Australia international Joel Monaghan.

== Playing career ==
=== Canberra Raiders ===
Monaghan played with the Canberra Raiders from 2001 to 2003. He made his first grade debut in round 16 of the 2001 NRL season against Cronulla at Bruce Stadium. Monaghan's last appearance for the club was Canberra's 17-16 elimination finals loss against the New Zealand Warriors during the 2003 NRL finals series.

=== Manly-Warringah Sea Eagles ===
Monaghan joined Manly-Warringah Sea Eagles in 2004 as halfback, but changed to hooker at the start of the 2006 season due to the purchase of halfback Matt Orford from Melbourne Storm.

He played in the 2007 NRL grand final defeat against the Melbourne Storm. This title was later stripped due to the Melbourne Storm salary cap breach.

=== Warrington Wolves ===
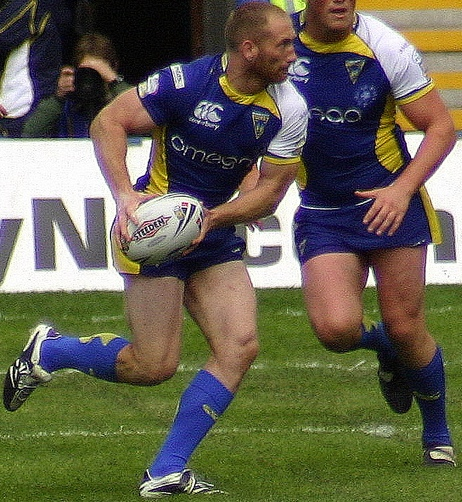
Monaghan playing for Warrington in 2008

The 27-year-old joined Manly teammate Chris Hicks in moving to Warrington Wolves for 2008's Super League XIII.

In March 2009 rumours emerged linking him with his former club Canberra and playing alongside brother Joel Monaghan again.

Monaghan played for Warrington in the 2009 and 2010 Challenge Cup Final victories over Huddersfield and Leeds respectively, winning the Lance Todd Trophy for his Man-of-Match performance in 2009.

Monaghan played in the 2010 Challenge Cup Final victory over Leeds at Wembley Stadium.

Monaghan played in the 2012 Challenge Cup Final victory over Leeds at Wembley Stadium. He also played in the 2012 Super League Grand Final against Leeds at Old Trafford.

Monaghan played in the 2013 Super League Grand Final defeat against Wigan at Old Trafford.

In May 2014, Monaghan announced he would be retiring at the end of the season.

== Coaching career ==
=== Catalans Dragons ===
He then joined the Catalans Dragons as assistant coach for the 2015 season and took temporary charge in 2017 with fellow assistant Jerome Guisset following the French club's decision to part company with head coach Laurent Frayssinous.

=== Manly-Warringah Sea Eagles ===
In 2018 Monaghan re-joined former club Manly as Pathways / Specialist coach.

== Honours ==
=== Warrington Wolves ===
- Challenge Cup(3): 2009, 2010, 2012

=== Individual awards ===
- 2006 Ken Stephen award.
- 2009 Lance Todd Trophy
