= Ben Westwood =

Former England international rugby league footballer

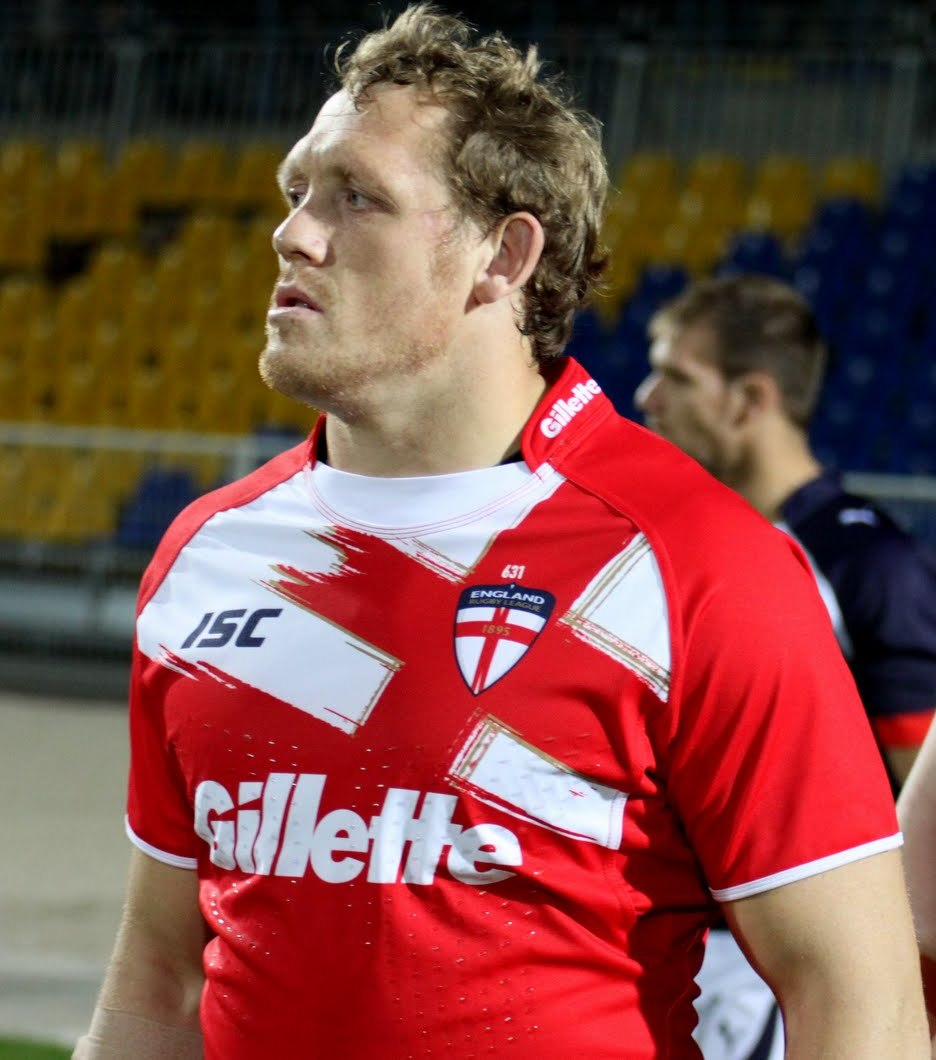

Personal information
- Born: 25 July 1981 (age 44) Normanton, West Yorkshire, England

Playing information
- Height: 6 ft 2 in (188 cm)
- Weight: 16 st 5 lb (104 kg)
- Position: Second-row, Loose forward
Club
Years	Team	Pld	T	G	FG	P
1999–02	Wakefield Trinity Wildcats	41	10	1	0	42
2002–19	Warrington Wolves	446	128	83	0	678
	Total	487	138	84	0	720
Representative
Years	Team	Pld	T	G	FG	P
2002	Yorkshire	1	0	0	0	0
2011	England Knights	1	0	1	0	2
2004–13	England	27	3	5	0	22

Ben Westwood (born 25 July 1981) is an English former rugby league footballer, who played as a second-row or loose forward in the Super League. He played for England at international level, and also represented England Knights and Yorkshire.

He started his professional career with the Wakefield Trinity Wildcats in the Super League before moving to the Warrington Wolves in 2002. He made over 400 appearances during his 18 years at the club, and was part of Warrington's 2009, 2010 and 2012 Challenge Cup winning teams.

== Background ==
Westwood was born in Normanton, West Yorkshire, England.

== Playing career ==
=== Early career ===
He began his career at local team Normanton Knights, before being scouted for Wakefield Trinity Wildcats.

=== Club career ===
==== Wakefield Trinity Wildcats ====
Westwood spent three seasons with Wakefield Trinity Wildcats between 1999 and 2002.

==== Warrington Wolves ====
In June 2002, Westwood was transferred to Warrington Wolves for a fee of £60,000.

A talismanic player for Warrington who has been top tackler at the club for the past two seasons and top tackler out of marker for the past three, Westwood was Warrington's Players' Player of the Year and Fans' Player of the Year in 2007. A conversion from the centers to the pack at the start of 2005 transformed his career and pushed him to international honors.

He was named in the Super League Dream Team for 2008's Super League XIII.

Westwood played in the 2010 Challenge Cup Final victory over the Leeds Rhinos at Wembley Stadium.

He also enjoyed a good year in 2011 despite injuries, when the Wire topped the league table.

He played in the 2012 Challenge Cup Final victory over the Leeds Rhinos at Wembley Stadium.

He played in the 2012 Super League Grand Final defeat by the Leeds Rhinos at Old Trafford.

He played in the 2013 Super League Grand Final defeat by the Wigan Warriors at Old Trafford.

He played in the 2016 Challenge Cup Final defeat by Hull F.C. at Wembley Stadium.

He played in the 2018 Challenge Cup Final defeat by the Catalans Dragons at Wembley Stadium, and played in the 2018 Super League Grand Final defeat by the Wigan Warriors at Old Trafford.

In July 2019, Westwood announced he would be retiring at the end of the season.

=== Representative career ===
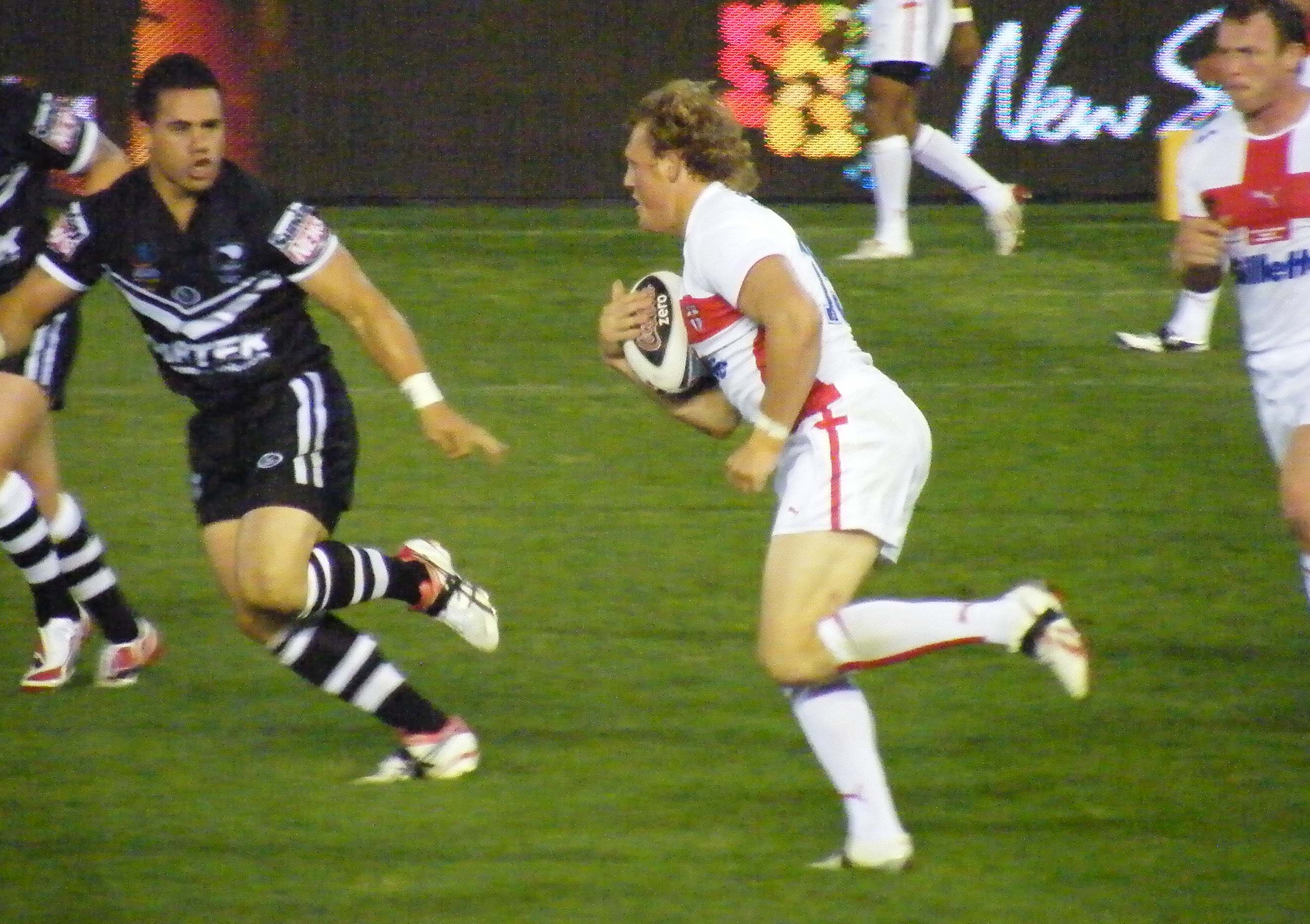
Westwood in action for England against New Zealand at the 2008 Rugby League World Cup

He was a substitute for Yorkshire against Lancashire in the second game of the expanded County of Origin series in 2002.

He won a call up to the Great Britain standby squad for the 2006 Tri-Nations.

In September 2008 he was named in the England training squad for the 2008 Rugby League World Cup, and in October 2008 he was named in the final 24-man England squad.

By 2011, Westwood has established himself within the England squad and appeared in all of England's 2011 Four Nations matches. His performances in the tournament were noted as characteristics of a hard-working and aggressive back-rower who thrives on intensity.

He was named in the England squad for the 2013 Rugby League World Cup.
