= Garreth Carvell =

English rugby league footballer

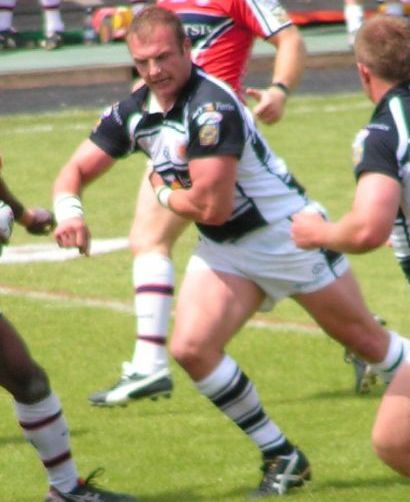

Personal information
- Born: 21 April 1980 (age 46) Leeds, West Yorkshire, England

Playing information
- Height: 6 ft 2 in (1.88 m)
- Weight: 17 st 13 lb (114 kg)
- Position: Prop
Club
Years	Team	Pld	T	G	FG	P
1997–00	Leeds Rhinos	4	0	0	0	0
1999(loan)	→ Gateshead Thunder	8	1	0	0	4
2001–08	Hull FC	169	24	0	0	96
2009–13	Warrington Wolves	135	18	0	0	72
2014	Hull FC	7	0	0	0	0
2014	Castleford Tigers	6	1	0	0	4
2015	Featherstone Rovers	5	0	0	0	0
	Total	334	44	0	0	176
Representative
Years	Team	Pld	T	G	FG	P
2000	Wales	2	0	0	0	0
2006	Great Britain	2	0	0	0	0
2009–11	England	4	0	0	0	0

Garreth Carvell (born 21 April 1980) is an English former professional rugby league footballer who played as a prop in the 1990s, 2000s and 2010s. He played at representative level for Great Britain, England and Wales. He played in the Super League for Warrington Wolves, Leeds Rhinos, Gateshead Thunder (loan), Hull FC, and Castleford Tigers, and in the Championship for Featherstone Rovers, as a prop or second-row.

== Background ==
Carvell was born in Leeds, West Yorkshire, England.

== Playing career ==
=== Club career ===
Carvell joined Leeds from junior club Stanningley in 1996. He made his Super League début as a 17-year-old against the Sheffield Eagles on Friday 22 August 1997.

After a successful loan spell at the newly formed Gateshead Thunder in 1999, he signed for Hull F.C. in 2000 where he developed into one of the top props in the country, helping Hull F.C. to win the 2005 Challenge Cup Final.

Hull F.C. reached the 2006 Super League Grand final to be contested against St Helens, and Carvell played as a prop in his side's 4–26 loss. He also helped Hull F.C. reach the 2008 Challenge Cup Final.

After signing a deal that would keep Carvell at Hull F.C. for the next three years he made a controversial U-turn and made the move to Warrington after a fee was paid. Carvell played for Warrington in the 2009 Challenge Cup final victory over Huddersfield, 2010 Challenge Cup Final victory over Leeds. and the 2012 challenge cup final victory again over Leeds. He also featured in the 2012 and 2013 Grand final defeats.

Carvell played in the 2010 Challenge Cup Final victory over Leeds at Wembley Stadium.

Carvell played in the 2012 Challenge Cup Final victory over Leeds at Wembley Stadium.

Carvell played in the 2013 Super League Grand Final defeat by Wigan at Old Trafford.

Midway through the 2013 season Bradford announced that they had signed Carvell for the 2014 and 2015 seasons by signing him on a two-year deal. Carvell featured in the pre-season game against Hull FC. However, in the week leading up to the first Super League game the Bradford club went into administration and Carvell made the switch to former club Hull F.C. on a one-year deal.

He then moved to the Castleford Tigers before finishing his career with a brief spell at Featherstone Rovers in the Championship making his début for Featherstone Rovers on Sunday 26 April 2015.

=== International honours ===
In 2000, Carvell made his international début when he represented Wales in the 2000 Rugby League World Cup. Garreth represented Great Britain in 2006 in the 2006 Tri-Nations competition held in Australia.

Carvell was named in the England training squad for the 2008 Rugby League World Cup.

Carvell was also named in England's 24-man 2011 Four Nations squad. He appeared off the bench against New Zealand at the KC Stadium, Hull, and in the final against Australia at Elland Road, Leeds.

In September 2014, Carvell was again called up to play for Wales in the 2014 European Cup. This was the first time that Carvell played for Wales in 14 years, but he had to withdraw before the tournament due to an injury.

== Post-playing ==
After retiring as a player, Carvell joined Salford Red Devils, working as the under-19's head coach and player welfare manager. In 2021, he was appointed as head of rugby at Leigh Centurions.

Carvell was also involved in re-forming a rugby league players' union, the Rugby League Players' Association, and acts as the union's lead representative.
