= Chris Bridge =

England & Ireland international rugby league footballer

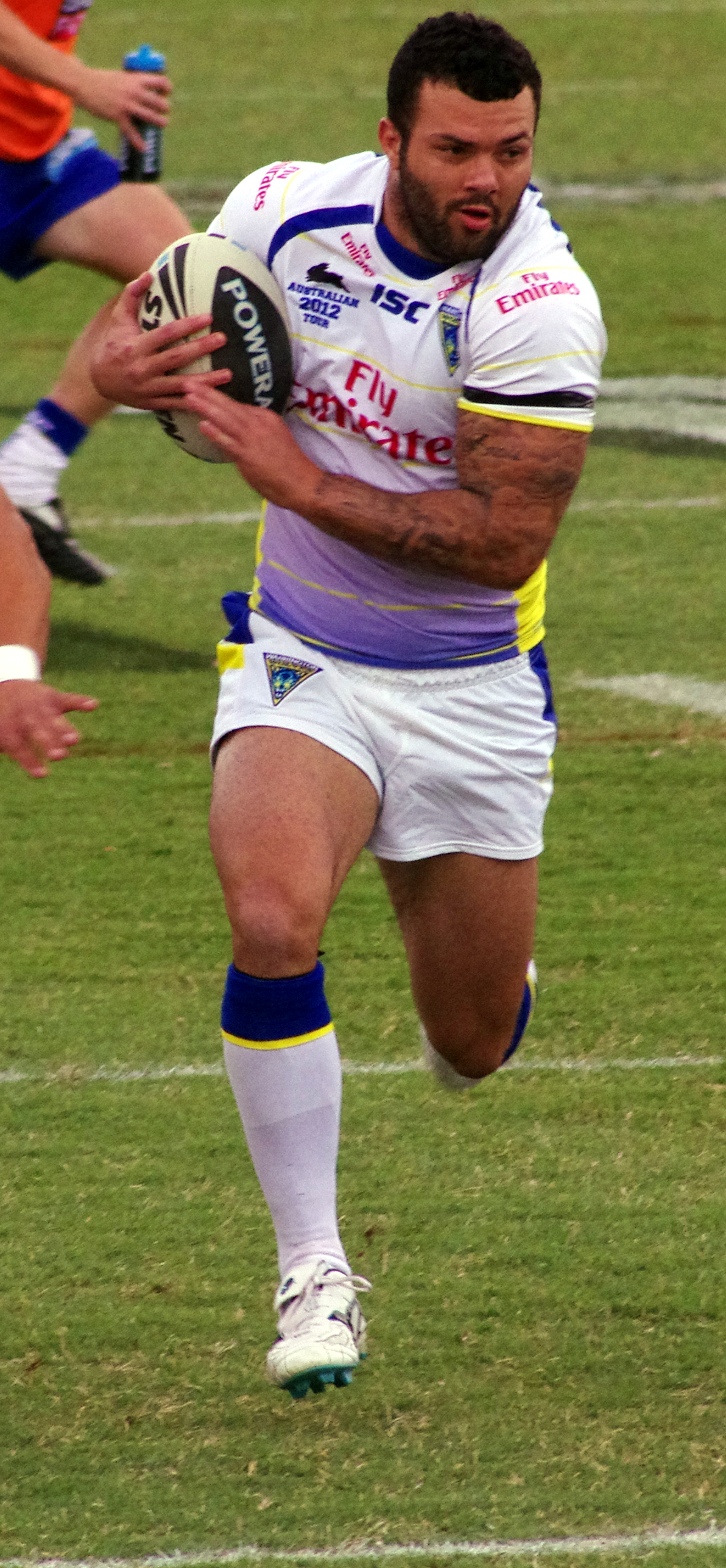

Personal information
- Full name: Christopher Bridge
- Born: 5 July 1984 (age 41) Oldham, Greater Manchester, England

Playing information
- Height: 5 ft 11 in (1.80 m)
- Weight: 14 st 9 lb (93 kg)
- Position: Centre, Stand-off, Scrum-half
Club
Years	Team	Pld	T	G	FG	P
2001–05	Bradford Bulls	17	4	6	0	28
2005–15	Warrington Wolves	228	107	311	1	1051
2013(loan)	→ Swinton Lions	1	0	0	0	0
2016–17	Widnes Vikings	35	11	21	0	86
	Total	281	122	338	1	1165
Representative
Years	Team	Pld	T	G	FG	P
2006–07	Ireland	3	2	12	0	32
2009–10	England	4	1	0	0	4
- Relatives: Danny Bridge (brother)

Chris Bridge (5 July 1984) is a former professional rugby league footballer who played as a centre, stand-off and scrum-half in the 2000s and 2010s.

He played for the Bradford Bulls, Warrington Wolves and the Widnes Vikings in the Super League, and on loan from Warrington at the Swinton Lions in the Championship. He played at international level for Ireland and England.

== Background ==
Bridge was born in Oldham, Greater Manchester, England.

== Playing career ==
=== Club career ===
==== Huddersfield Giants ====
He was in the youth system of the Huddersfield Giants.

==== Bradford Bulls ====
Bridge began his career with the Bradford Bulls.

==== Warrington Wolves ====
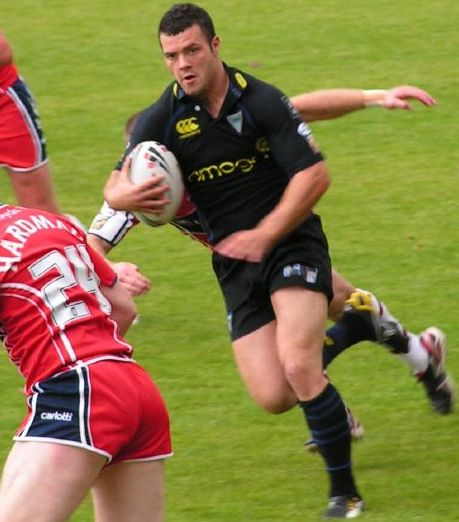
Bridge playing for Warrington in 2007

He had 10 successful seasons with Warrington Wolves. He started the 2008 campaign in superb form, scoring two tries; ultimately being Warrington's first try scorer of the 2008 season. However, during the second match of the season, away to St Helens, he was carried off with a ruptured achilles tendon.

He played in the 2013 Super League Grand Final defeat by the Wigan Warriors at Old Trafford.

==== Widnes Vikings ====
It was confirmed on 14 July 2015 that Bridge signed a two-year deal to play for Widnes Vikings from the start of the 2016 Super League season.

In June 2017, Bridge announced he would be retiring at the end of the season.

=== International career ===
==== Ireland ====
He was named in the Ireland training squad for the 2008 Rugby League World Cup.

==== England ====
In November 2010 he opted out of representing England in the Four Nations due to his wife Kirsten Kimberlee giving birth to their first child, Anais Elise.

He was selected to play for England against France in the one-off test in 2010.
