= 2016 Warrington Wolves season =

- Super League XXI Rank: 1st League Leaders winners!!!
- Play-off result: Runners Up
- Challenge Cup: Runners Up
- 2016 record: Wins: 26; draws: 1; losses: 10
- Points scored: For: 892; against: 573

Team information
- Chairman: Steven Broomhead
- Head Coach: Tony Smith
- Captain: Chris Hill
- Stadium: Halliwell Jones Stadium

Top scorers
- Tries: Ben Currie - 12
- Goals: Kurt Gidley - 59
- Points: Kurt Gidley - 138
← 2015	List of seasons	2017 →

This article details the Warrington Wolves Rugby League Football Club's 2016 season. This is the Wolves' 21st consecutive season in the Super League.

== Results ==
=== Pre season friendlies ===
LEGEND
Win
Draw
Loss

Date	Competition	Vrs	H/A	Venue	Result	Score	Tries	Goals	Att
27/12/15	Pre Season	Widnes Vikings	A	Select Security Stadium	W	40-0	T King, Dwyer (2), Lineham, Patton, Johnson, Livett	Gidley (5), Patton	5,177
24/1/16	Pre Season	Leigh Centurions	H	Halliwell Jones Stadium	W	46-4	Sims, Ormsby (3), Evans, Gidley, Lineham, Currie, Penny	Gidley (3), Sandow (2)	4,963

=== Super League ===
==== Super League table ====
Pos	Team	Pld	W	D	L	PF	PA	PD	Pts	Qualification
1	Hull F.C.	23	17	0	6	605	465	+140	34	Super League Super 8s
2	Warrington Wolves	23	16	1	6	675	425	+250	33	Super League Super 8s
3	Wigan Warriors	23	16	0	7	455	440	+15	32	Super League Super 8s
4	St Helens	23	14	0	9	573	536	+37	28	Super League Super 8s
5	Catalans Dragons	23	13	0	10	593	505	+88	26	Super League Super 8s
6	Castleford Tigers	23	10	1	12	617	640	−23	21	Super League Super 8s
7	Widnes Vikings	23	10	0	13	499	474	+25	20	Super League Super 8s
8	Wakefield Trinity Wildcats	23	10	0	13	485	654	−169	20	Super League Super 8s
9	Leeds Rhinos	23	8	0	15	404	576	−172	16	The Qualifiers
10	Salford City Reds	23	10	0	13	560	569	−9	14 (Note: Salford deducted 6 points for salary cap breaches in 2014 and 2015.)	The Qualifiers
11	Hull Kingston Rovers	23	6	2	15	486	610	−124	14	The Qualifiers
12	Huddersfield Giants	23	6	0	17	511	569	−58	12	The Qualifiers

Source: Rugby League Project
Rules for classification: 1) Points; 2) Points difference; 3) Number of points scored;

==== Super League results ====
LEGEND
Win
Draw
Loss

Date	Round	Vrs	H/A	Venue	Result	Score	Tries	Goals	Att	Live on TV
4/2/16	1	Leeds	A	Headingley Stadium	W	12-10	Sandow, Penny	Gidley 2/2	16,168	Sky Sports
14/2/16	2	Hull Kingston Rovers	H	Halliwell Jones Stadium	W	38-8	Currie, Westerman, Lineham (3), Clark	Gidley 7/7	11,037	-
26/2/16	3	Wakefield Trinity	H	Halliwell Jones Stadium	W	34-16	Currie (2), Sandow (2), Penny, Gidley	Gidley 5/6	10,631	-
3/3/16	4	Salford	A	AJ Bell Stadium	W	31-30	Hughes, Currie, Atkins (2), Sims	Sandow 5/5, Sandow 1 DG	4,861	Sky Sports
12/3/16	5	Catalans Dragons	A	Stade Gilbert Brutus	W	30-20	R.Evans (2), Currie, G.King, Sandow	Gidley 5/5	8,859	Sky Sports
18/3/16	6	Castleford	H	Halliwell Jones Stadium	W	56-12	Sandow (2), Penny, Lineham (2), Russell (2), Atkins, Currie (2), Dwyer	Gidley 6/9, Sandow 0/1, Ratchford 0/1	10,940	-
25/3/16	7	Widnes	H	Halliwell Jones Stadium	W	28-10	Sandow, Lineham, Gidley, Atkins, Currie	Gidley 4/5	15,008	-
28/3/16	8	Hull F.C.	A	KC Stadium	L	24-26	Atkins, Lineham (2), Sandow, Penny	Sandow 1/3, Ratchford 1/2	9,967	-
1/4/16	9	Wigan	A	DW Stadium	W	28-16	Currie, Lineham, Penny, Ratchford, Atkins	Gidley 3/3, Ratchford 1/1, Sandow 0/3, Westerman 0/1	17,480	Sky Sports
8/4/16	10	St. Helens	H	Halliwell Jones Stadium	L	22-25	Penny (2), Atkins, Currie, Lineham	Gidley 0/1, Westwood 1/3	13,678	Sky Sports
15/4/16	11	Huddersfield	A	Galpharm Stadium	L	0-11	-	-	5,427	
22/4/16	12	Widnes	A	Select Security Stadium	W	48-16	Gidley, Penny (2), Westerman (2), Westwood, Ratchford (2)	Gidley 7/7, Ratchford 1/1	7,441	-
28/4/16	13	Wigan	H	Halliwell Jones Stadium	W	40-10	Westwood (2), Benjamin Jullien, Clark, Atkins (2), Penny	Gidley 5/6, Ratchford 1/1	11,724	Sky Sports
15/5/16	14	Wakefield Trinity	A	Belle Vue	L	36-28	Westerman (2), Clark, Gidley, Russell	Gidley (3), Smith	5,180	
21/5/16	15	Castleford	N	St James' Park	L	14-34	Gidley, Ratchford, Currie	Gidley	39,331	Sky Sports
27/5/16	16	Leeds	H	Halliwell Jones Stadium	W	52-18	Clark (2), Atkins, Ratchford, Gidley, Lineham, Dwyer, Ormsby (2)	Gidley (8)	10,317	Sky Sports
03/06/16	17	St. Helens	A	Langtree Park	W	26-4	Currie, Sandow, Atkins, Ratchford, R.Evans	Gidley(3)	11,353	Sky Sports
10/06/16	18	Hull F.C.	H	Halliwell Jones Stadium	L	12-19	Ormsby, Sandow	Gidley (2)	10,518	Sky Sports
17/06/16	19	Catalans Dragons	H	Halliwell Jones Stadium	W	20-18	Atkins, Penny, Dwyer	Gidley (4)	9,529	Sky Sports
01/07/16	20	Hull Kingston Rovers	A	Craven Park	D	16-16	Russell, Dwyer, Hughes	Ratchford (2)	6,827	
07/07/16	21	Salford	H	Halliwell Jones Stadium	W	40-14	Westerman (2), Atkins (2), Lineham, Patton, Russell	Ratchford, Patton (5)	9,024	Sky Sports
17/07/16	22	Castleford	A	The Jungle	W	26-42	Rhys Evans (3), Ratchford, Dwyer, Currie, King, Clark	Gidley (3), Sandow (4)	8,060	
24/07/16	23	Huddersfield	H	Halliwell Jones Stadium	W	34-30	Ratchford, Currie, Westwood, Sandow, Atkins, Clark	Gidley (5)	Attendance	

=== Super 8s ===
==== Super 8s table ====
Pos	Team	Pld	W	D	L	PF	PA	PD	Pts	Qualification
1	Warrington Wolves (L)	30	21	1	8	852	541	+311	43	Semi-finals
2	Wigan Warriors (C)	30	21	0	9	669	560	+109	42	Semi-finals
3	Hull F.C.	30	20	0	10	749	579	+170	40	Semi-finals
4	St Helens	30	20	0	10	756	641	+115	40	Semi-finals
5	Castleford Tigers	30	15	1	14	830	808	+22	31	
6	Catalans Dragons	30	15	0	15	723	716	+7	30	
7	Widnes Vikings	30	12	0	18	603	643	−40	24	
8	Wakefield Trinity	30	10	0	20	571	902	−331	20	

Source: BBC Sport
(C) Champions; (L) League Leaders' Shield Winners

==== Super 8s results ====
Date	Rnd	Vrs	H/A	Venue	Result	Score	Tries	Goals	Att	Live on TV
4/8/16	S1	St. Helens	H	Halliwell Jones Stadium	L	18-20	Try Scorers	Goal Scorers	Attendance	TV
14/8/16	S2	Wakefield Trinity	A	Belle Vue	W	38-10	Try Scorers	Goal Scorers	Attendance	TV
20/8/16	S3	Castleford	H	Halliwell Jones Stadium	W	14-11	Try Scorers	Goal Scorers	Attendance	TV
3/9/16	S4	Catalans Dragons	A	Stade Gilbert Brutus	W	26-22	Try Scorers	Goal Scorers	Attendance	TV
11/9/16	S5	Widnes	H	Halliwell Jones Stadium	W	30-12	Try Scorers	Goal Scorers	Attendance	TV
18/9/16	S6	Wigan	H	Halliwell Jones Stadium	L	28-35	Try Scorers	Goal Scorers	Attendance	TV
23/9/16	S7	Hull F.C.	A	KC Stadium	W	23-6	Try Scorers	Goal Scorers	Attendance	TV

=== Play-offs ===
Date	Round	Vrs	H/A	Venue	Result	Score	Tries	Goals	Att	Live on TV
29/9/16	Semi Final	St. Helens	H	Halliwell Jones Stadium	W	18-10	Try Scorers	Goal Scorers	Attendance	Sky Sports
08/10/16	Grand Final	Wigan	N	Old Trafford	W/D/L	Score	Try Scorers	Goal Scorers	Attendance	Sky Sports

=== Player appearances ===
FB=Fullback	C=Centre	W=Winger	SO=Stand-off	SH=Scrum half	PR=Prop	H=Hooker	SR=Second Row	L=Loose forward	B=Bench

No	Player	1	2	3	4	5	6	7	8	9	10	11	12	13	14	15	16	17	18	19	20	21	22	23	S1	S2	S3	S4	S5	S6	S7
1	Kurt Gidley	SO	SO	SO		SO	SO	SO		SO	SO	SO	SO	SO	SO	SO	SO	x	x	x	x	x	x	x	x	x	x	x	x	x	x
2	Tom Lineham	W	W	W	W	W	W	W	W	W	W			W	W	W	W	x	x	x	x	x	x	x	x	x	x	x	x	x	x
3	Rhys Evans	C	C	C	C	C	C	C	C	C	B	W	C	C	C		C	x	x	x	x	x	x	x	x	x	x	x	x	x	x
4	Ryan Atkins		B	C	C	C	C	C	C	C	C	C	C	C	C		C	x	x	x	x	x	x	x	x	x	x	x	x	x	x
5	Matty Russell	FB	FB	FB	FB	FB	FB			FB	FB	FB	FB	FB	FB	FB		x	x	x	x	x	x	x	x	x	x	x	x	x	x
6	Stefan Ratchford				SO	B	B	FB	SO	B	SH	SH	SH	SH		SH	FB	x	x	x	x	x	x	x	x	x	x	x	x	x	x
7	Chris Sandow	SH	SH	SH	SH	SH	SH	SH	SH	SH							SH	x	x	x	x	x	x	x	x	x	x	x	x	x	x
8	Chris Hill	P	P	P	P	P	P	P	P	P	P	P	P	P	P	P	P	x	x	x	x	x	x	x	x	x	x	x	x	x	x
9	Daryl Clark	H	H	H			B	H	H	H	H	H	H	H	H	H	H	x	x	x	x	x	x	x	x	x	x	x	x	x	x
10	Ashton Sims	P	P	P	P	P	P	P	P	P	P	P	P	P	P	P	P	x	x	x	x	x	x	x	x	x	x	x	x	x	x
11	Ben Currie	C	C	SR	SR	SR	SR	SR	SR	SR	C	SR	SR	SR	SH	SR	SR	x	x	x	x	x	x	x	x	x	x	x	x	x	x
12	Jack Hughes	SR	SR	SR	SR	SR	SR	SR	SR	SR	SR	C	SR	SR				x	x	x	x	x	x	x	x	x	x	x	x	x	x
13	Ben Westwood	SR	SR					B	B	L	SR	SR	B	B	SR	SR	SR	x	x	x	x	x	x	x	x	x	x	x	x	x	x
14	Joe Westerman	L	L	L	L	L	L	L	L	B	L	L	L	L	L	L	L	x	x	x	x	x	x	x	x	x	x	x	x	x	x
15	Mitchell Dodds				B	B												x	x	x	x	x	x	x	x	x	x	x	x	x	x
16	Brad Dwyer	B	B	B	H	H	H										B	x	x	x	x	x	x	x	x	x	x	x	x	x	x
17	James Laithwaite																	x	x	x	x	x	x	x	x	x	x	x	x	x	x
18	George King	B	B	B	B	B	B	B	B	B	B	B	B	B	B	B	B	x	x	x	x	x	x	x	x	x	x	x	x	x	x
19	Ben Harrison																x	x	x	x	x	x	x	x	x	x	x	x	x	x	x
20	Kevin Penny	W	W	W	W	W	W	W	W	W	W	W	W	W	W			x	x	x	x	x	x	x	x	x	x	x	x	x	x
21	Ben Evans																	x	x	x	x	x	x	x	x	x	x	x	x	x	x
22	Gene Ormsby	x	x	x	x	x	x	x	x	x	x	x	x	x	x	W	W	x	x	x	x	x	x	x	x	x	x	x	x	x	x
23	Gary Wheeler	x	x	x	B													x	x	x	x	x	x	x	x	x	x	x	x	x	x
24	Toby King			x	x	x	x	x	x	x	x	x	x	x	x	C	x	x	x	x	x	x	x	x	x	x	x	x	x	x	x
25	Joe Philbin	x	x	x	x	x	x	x	x	x	B	B	x	x	B	x	x	x	x	x	x	x	x	x	x	x	x	x	x	x	x
26	Declan Patton	x	x	x	x	x	x	x	B	x	x	x	x	x	x	x	x	x	x	x	x	x	x	x	x	x	x	x	x	x	x
27	Sam Wilde	x	x	x	x	x	x	x	x	x	x	B	x	x	x	x	x	x	x	x	x	x	x	x	x	x	x	x	x	x	x
28	Jack Johnson	x	x	x	x	x	x	x	FB	x	x	x	W	x	x	x	x	x	x	x	x	x	x	x	x	x	x	x	x	x	x
29	Benjamin Jullien	B	x	B	B	x	x	x	x	x	B	B	B	B	SR	B	B	x	x	x	x	x	x	x	x	x	x	x	x	x	x
30	Harvey Livett	x	x	x	x	x	x	x	x	x	x	x	x	x	x	x	x	x	x	x	x	x	x	x	x	x	x	x	x	x	x
31	Morgan Smith	x	x	x	x	x	x	x	x	x	x	x	x	x	B	B	x	x	x	x	x	x	x	x	x	x	x	x	x	x	x
32	Jordan Cox	B	B	B		B	B	B	B	B			B	B	B	B	x	x	x	x	x	x	x	x	x	x	x	x	x	x	x
33	Ryan Bailey															B	B	x	x	x	x	x	x	x	x	x	x	x	x	x	x

= Injured

= Suspended

== Challenge Cup ==
LEGEND
Win
Draw
Loss

Date	Round	Vrs	H/A	Venue	Result	Score	Tries	Goals	Att	TV
7/5/16	6th	Oldham	A	Bower Fold	W	70-10	G.King (3), Lineham, Smith, Jullien (2), R.Evans, Ormsby (2), Currie, Hill	Gidley 6/9, Ratchford 3/4	2,394	-
24/6/16	QF	Widnes	H	Halliwell Jones Stadium	W	20-18	Hughes, Penny, Dwyer	Gidley 4/5		BBC Sport
30/7/16	SF	Wakefield Trinity	N	Leigh Sports Village	W	56-12	Hughes, Clark, R.Evans, Gidley, Chris Sandow/Sandow, Ratchford, Currie, King (2), Westwood	Gidley 7/8, Ratchford 1/2	10,358	BBC Sport
27/8/16	F	Hull F.C.	N	Wembley	W/D/L	Score	Try Scorers	Goal Scores	Attendance	BBC Sport

=== Player appearances ===
FB=Fullback	C=Centre	W=Winger	SO=Stand Off	SH=Scrum half	P=Prop	H=Hooker	SR=Second Row	L=Loose forward	B=Bench

No	Player	6	QF	SF	F
1	Kurt Gidley	SO	SO	SO	x
2	Tom Lineham	W	x	x	x
3	Rhys Evans	C	C	W	x
4	Ryan Atkins		C	C	x
5	Matty Russell	x	W	W	x
6	Stefan Ratchford	SH	FB	FB	x
7	Chris Sandow		SH	SH	x
8	Chris Hill	P	P	P	x
9	Daryl Clark	H	H	H	x
10	Ashton Sims	P	Red card	P	x
11	Ben Currie	SR	SR	SR	x
12	Jack Hughes	x	SR	SR	x
13	Ben Westwood	x	P	B	x
14	Joe Westerman	L	L	L	x
15	Mitchell Dodds			x	x
16	Brad Dwyer		B	B	x
17	James Laithwaite			x	x
18	George King	B	B	B	x
19	Ben Harrison			x	x
20	Kevin Penny	FB	W	x	x
21	Ben Evans			x	x
22	Gene Ormsby	W	x	x	x
23	Gary Wheeler			x	x
24	Toby King	x	x	C	x
25	Joe Philbin	SR	x	x	x
26	Declan Patton	x	x	x	x
27	Sam Wilde	B	x	x	x
28	Jack Johnson	x	x	x	x
29	Benjamin Jullien	C	x	x	x
30	Harvey Livett	x	x	x	x
31	Morgan Smith	B	x	x	x
32	Jordan Cox	B	B	x	x
33	Ryan Bailey		B	B	x

== 2016 squad statistics ==
- Appearances and points include (Super League, Challenge Cup and Play-offs) as of 22 April 2016.

No	Player	Position	Age	Previous club	Apps	Tries	Goals	DG	Points
1	Kurt Gidley	Fullback	N/A	Newcastle Knights	12	3	50	0	112
2	Tom Lineham	Winger	N/A	Hull F.C.	12	11	0	0	44
3	Rhys Evans	Centre	N/A	Warrington Wolves Academy	13	3	0	0	12
4	Ryan Atkins	Centre	N/A	Wakefield Trinity Wildcats	12	9	0	0	36
5	Matty Russell	Wing	N/A	Gold Coast Titans	12	2	0	0	8
6	Stefan Ratchford	Stand off	N/A	Salford Red Devils	11	3	7	0	26
7	Chris Sandow	Scrum half	N/A	Parramatta Eels	9	8	6	1	45
8	Chris Hill (c)	Prop	N/A	Leigh Centurions	14	1	0	0	4
9	Daryl Clark	Hooker	N/A	Castleford Tigers	12	2	0	0	8
10	Ashton Sims	Prop	N/A	North Queensland Cowboys	14	1	0	0	4
11	Ben Currie	Second row	N/A	Warrington Wolves Academy	14	12	0	0	48
12	Jack Hughes	Second row	N/A	Wigan Warriors	13	1	0	0	4
13	Ben Westwood	Loose forward	N/A	Wakefield Trinity Wildcats	10	3	1	0	14
14	Joe Westerman	Loose forward	N/A	Hull F.C.	14	3	0	0	12
15	Mitchell Dodds	Prop	N/A	Brisbane Broncos	2	0	0	0	0
16	Brad Dwyer	Hooker	N/A	Warrington Wolves Academy	6	1	0	0	4
17	James Laithwaite	Second row	N/A	Warrington Wolves Academy	0	0	0	0	0
18	George King	Second row	N/A	Warrington Wolves Academy	13	4	0	0	16
19	Ben Harrison	Loose forward	N/A	Warrington Wolves Academy	0	0	0	0	0
20	Kevin Penny	Wing	N/A	Swinton Lions	14	10	0	0	40
21	Ben Evans	Prop	N/A	Warrington Wolves Academy	0	0	0	0	0
22	Gene Ormsby	Wing	N/A	Swinton Lions	1	2	0	0	8
23	Gary Wheeler	Stand off	N/A	St Helens R.F.C.	1	0	0	0	0
24	Toby King	Centre	N/A	Warrington Wolves Academy	0	0	0	0	0
25	Joe Philbin	Second row	N/A	Warrington Wolves Academy	3	0	0	0	0
26	Declan Patton	Stand off	N/A	Warrington Wolves Academy	1	0	0	0	0
27	Sam Wilde	Second row	N/A	Warrington Wolves Academy	2	0	0	0	0
28	Jack Johnson	Fullback	N/A	Warrington Wolves Academy	2	0	0	0	0
29	Benjamin Jullien	Centre	N/A	SO Avignon	8	3	0	0	12
30	Harvey Livett	Loose forward	N/A	Warrington Wolves Academy	0	0	0	0	0
31	Morgan Smith	Prop	N/A	Warrington Wolves Academy	1	1	0	0	4
32	Jordan Cox	Second row	N/A	Hull Kingston Rovers	11	0	0	0	0
33	Ryan Bailey	Prop	N/A	Castleford Tigers	0	0	0	0	0

= Injured = Suspended

== 2016 transfers in/out ==
In

Player	Signed from	Contract length	Announced
(Australia) Kurt Gidley	Newcastle Knights	1 Year	May 2015
(England) Tom Lineham	Hull F.C.	4 Years	June 2015
(England) Jack Hughes	Wigan Warriors	2 Years	August 2015
(Australia) Mitchell Dodds	Brisbane Broncos	1 Year	September 2015
(France) Benjamin Jullien	SO Avignon	1 Year	September 2015
(England) Joe Westerman	Hull F.C.	3 Years	October 2015
(England) Jordan Cox	Hull Kingston Rovers	1 Year	October 2015
(England) Ryan Bailey	Castleford Tigers	1 Year	November 2015

Out

Player	Signed for	Contract length	Announced
(England) Chris Bridge	Widnes Vikings	2 Years	July 2015
(England) Richie Myler	Catalans Dragons	2 Years	July 2015
(New Zealand) Roy Asotasi	Retirement	N/A	September 2015
(Republic of Ireland) Simon Grix	Halifax / Wolves Coaching Staff	1 Year	September 2015
(England) Gareth O'Brien	Salford Red Devils	2 Years	October 2015
Anthony England	Wakefield Trinity Wildcats	1 Year	October 2015
(Australia) Joel Monaghan	Castleford Tigers	2 Years	October 2015
(England) Gene Orsmby	Huddersfield Giants	1 Month Loan	April 2016
