= 2015 Warrington Wolves season =

- Super League XX Rank: 6th
- Play-off result: Did not qualify
- Challenge Cup: Semi-final
- 2015 record: Wins: 17; draws: 0; losses: 17
- Points scored: For: 830; against: 714

Team information
- Chairman: Steven Broomhead
- Head Coach: Tony Smith
- Captain: Ben Westwood
- Stadium: Halliwell Jones Stadium

Top scorers
- Tries: Ben Currie - 19
- Goals: Gareth O'Brien - 40
- Points: Gareth O'Brien - 103
← 2014	List of seasons	2016 →

This article details the Warrington Wolves rugby league football club's 2015 season. This was the Wolves 20th season in the Super League.

== Results ==
=== Pre season friendlies ===
LEGEND
Win
Draw
Loss

Warrington score is first.

Date	Competition	Vrs	H/A	Venue	Result	Score	Tries	Goals	Att
17/1/15	Pre Season	Team	H/A	Stadium	W/D/L	Score	Try Scorers	Goal Kickers	Attendance
24/1/15	Pre Season	Team	H/A	Stadium	W/D/L	Score	Try Scorers	Goal Kickers	Attendance

=== World Club Series ===
LEGEND
Win
Draw
Loss

Date	Competition	Vrs	H/A	Venue	Result	Score	Tries	Goals	Att
20 February 2015	WCC	St George	H	Halliwell Jones Stadium	L	12-18	O'Brien, Atkins	O'Brien 2/3	13,080

2015 World Club Series Teams
Warrington Wolves	positions	St George Illawarra Dragons
23. Gary Wheeler	Fullback	1. Josh Dugan
2. Rhys Evans	Winger	2. Eto Nabuli
4. Ryan Atkins	Centre	3. Dane Nielsen
5. Joel Monaghan (c)	Centre	4. Dylan Farrell
24. Kevin Penny	Winger	5. Jason Nightingale
20. Gareth O'Brien	Stand off	6. Gareth Widdop
7. Richie Myler	Scrum half	7. Benji Marshall
8. Chris Hill	Prop	8. Rory O'Brien
9. Daryl Clark	Hooker	9. Mitch Rein
10. Ashton Sims	Prop	10. Leeson Ah Mau
17. Ben Currie	2nd Row	11. Tyson Frizell
18. James Laithwaite	2nd Row	12. Joel Thompson
12. Ben Westwood	Loose forward	13. Ben Creagh (c)
3. Chris Bridge	Interchange	14. Trent Merrin
13. Ben Harrison	Interchange	15. Jack De Belin
14. Micky Higham	Interchange	16. Jake Marketo
19. Anthony England	Interchange	17. George Rose
Tony Smith	Coach	Paul McGregor

=== Super League ===
==== Super League table ====
Pos	Team	Pld	W	D	L	PF	PA	PD	Pts	Qualification
1	Leeds Rhinos	23	16	1	6	758	477	+281	33	Super League Super 8s
2	St Helens	23	16	0	7	598	436	+162	32	Super League Super 8s
3	Wigan Warriors	23	15	1	7	589	413	+176	31	Super League Super 8s
4	Huddersfield Giants	23	13	2	8	538	394	+144	28	Super League Super 8s
5	Castleford Tigers	23	13	0	10	547	505	+42	26	Super League Super 8s
6	Warrington Wolves	23	12	0	11	552	456	+96	24	Super League Super 8s
7	Hull F.C.	23	11	0	12	452	484	−32	22	Super League Super 8s
8	Catalans Dragons	23	9	2	12	561	574	−13	20	Super League Super 8s
9	Widnes Vikings	23	9	1	13	518	565	−47	19	The Qualifiers
10	Hull Kingston Rovers	23	9	0	14	534	646	−112	18	The Qualifiers
11	Salford City Reds	23	8	1	14	447	617	−170	17	The Qualifiers
12	Wakefield Trinity Wildcats	23	3	0	20	402	929	−527	6	The Qualifiers

Source: Rugby League Project
Rules for classification: 1) Points; 2) Points difference; 3) Number of points scored;

==== Super League results ====
LEGEND
Win
Draw
Loss

Date	Round	Vrs	H/A	Venue	Result	Score	Tries	Goals	Att	Live on TV
7/2/15	1	Salford	H	Halliwell Jones Stadium	W	22-8	Myler, Higham, Atkins, R.Evans	Ratchford 3/4	11,864	-
13/2/15	2	Hull F.C.	A	KC Stadium	W	7-6	Clark	O'Brien 1/1, O'Brien 1 DG	12,000	-
28/2/15	3	Catalans Dragons	A	Stade Gilbert Brutus	L	18-38	Monaghan, Wheeler, Philbin	O'Brien 3/3	8,946	Sky Sports
8/3/15	4	Hull Kingston Rovers	H	Halliwell Jones Stadium	W	32-24	Russell (2), Monaghan, Philbin, Wheeler, Currie	Ratchford 4/6	9,587	-
13/3/15	5	Leeds	H	Halliwell Jones Stadium	W	18-6	Penny, Ratchford, Atkins	Ratchford 3/3	10,075	Sky Sports
19/3/15	6	St. Helens	A	Langtree Park	L	24-32	Clark, Higham, Penny, Hill	Ratchford 1/1, O'Brien 3/3	12,618	Sky Sports
27/3/15	7	Huddersfield	H	Halliwell Jones Stadium	L	10-29	O'Brien, Penny	O'Brien 1/2	9,019	-
2/4/15	8	Widnes	A	Halton Stadium	L	10-30	Westwood, Currie	O'Brien 1/2	7,768	-
6/4/15	9	Castleford	H	Halliwell Jones Stadium	L	14-22	Ratchford, Atkins, Penny	O'Brien 1/3	8,518	Sky Sports
11/4/15	10	Wakefield Trinity	H	Halliwell Jones Stadium	W	80-0	Ormsby (2), T.King (2), Clark, Myler (3), Sims, Ratchford, Westwood, Monaghan, Currie (2)	Ratchford 12/14	8,036	-
16/4/15	11	Wigan	A	DW Stadium	L	20-30	Monaghan, Bridge (2), Currie	Ratchford 2/4	14,175	Sky Sports
24/4/15	12	Leeds	A	Headingley Stadium	W	29-10	Ormsby, Monaghan, Sims, Currie, Asotasi	Ratchford 4/5, Patton 1 DG	17,430	Sky Sports
3/5/15	13	Widnes	H	Halliwell Jones Stadium	W	22-20	Ormsby, Monaghan (2), Clark, Westwood	Ratchford 1/5	10,856	-
10/5/15	14	Hull F.C.	H	Halliwell Jones Stadium	L	26-27	Monaghan (2), Currie, Ormsby (2)	Ratchford 2/4, Bridge 1/1	9,697	-
22/5/15	15	Salford	A	AJ Bell Stadium	W	34-18	Currie, Ormsby (3), Ratchford, Dwyer	Ratchford 5/6	6,159	-
31/5/15	16 (Note: Magic Weekend)	St. Helens	N	St James' Park	L	16-20	Ratchford, Harrison, Atkins	Bridge 2/3	26,970	Sky Sports
5/6/15	17	Catalans Dragons	H	Halliwell Jones Stadium	W	26-18	Currie (2), Atkins (2), Hill	O'Brien 3/5	8,611	Sky Sports
14/6/15	18	Huddersfield	A	Galpharm Stadium	L	19-30	Clark, O'Brien, Harrison	O'Brien 3/3, O'Brien 1 DG	5,797	-
19/6/15	19	Hull Kingston Rovers	A	Craven Park	L	10-36	Hill, Ormsby	Patton 1/2	7,455	Sky Sports
2/7/15	20	Wigan	H	Halliwell Jones Stadium	W	17-6	Myler, Atkins, O'Brien	O'Brien 2/3, O'Brien 1 DG	10,504	Sky Sports
12/7/15	21	Wakefield Trinity	A	Belle Vue	W	40-20	Ratchford, Philbin, Russell (2), Westwood, Clark, Myler	O'Brien 6/7	3,354	-
16/7/15	22	St. Helens	H	Halliwell Jones Stadium	L	14-20	Currie, Penny	O'Brien 3/3	11,618	Sky Sports
26/7/15	23	Castleford	A	The Jungle	W	44-6	Monaghan (2), Westwood, O'Brien, Ormsby, Currie, Ratchford, Wilde, Myler	O'Brien 4/9	7,239	-

=== Super 8s ===
==== Super 8s table ====
Pos	Team	Pld	W	D	L	PF	PA	PD	Pts	Qualification
1	Leeds Rhinos (L, C)	30	20	1	9	944	650	+294	41	Semi-finals
2	Wigan Warriors	30	20	1	9	798	530	+268	41	Semi-finals
3	Huddersfield Giants	30	18	2	10	750	534	+216	38	Semi-finals
4	St Helens	30	19	0	11	766	624	+142	38	Semi-finals
5	Castleford Tigers	30	16	0	14	731	746	−15	32	
6	Warrington Wolves	30	15	0	15	714	636	+78	30	
7	Catalans Dragons	30	13	2	15	739	770	−31	28	
8	Hull F.C.	30	12	0	18	620	716	−96	24	

Source: Rugby League Project
(C) Champions; (L) League Leaders' Shield Winners

==== Super 8s results ====
Date	Round	Vrs	H/A	Venue	Result	Score	Tries	Goals	Att	Live on TV
7/8/15	S1	Leeds	A	Headingley Stadium	L	10-49	Penny (2)	Sandow 1/2	13,118	Sky Sports
13/8/15	S2	Castleford	A	The Jungle	L	16-17	Myler (2), Penny	Sandow 2/3	5,212	Sky Sports
21/8/15	S3	Wigan	H	Halliwell Jones Stadium	L	0-28	-	-	10,095	Sky Sports
6/9/15	S4	Hull F.C.	H	Halliwell Jones Stadium	W	46-16	Penny (3), Wheeler (2), Currie, Atkins, Monaghan (2)	Sandow 5/9	8,076	Sky Sports
13/9/15	S5	Huddersfield	A	Galpharm Stadium	L	10-48	Westwood, Asotasi	Sandow 1/2	5,563	Sky Sports
19/9/15	S6	Catalans Dragons	H	Halliwell Jones Stadium	W	48-6	Monaghan (3), Atkins (2), Johnson (2), Currie, Myler	Sandow 4/7, Monaghan 1/1, Asotasi 1/1	7,862	Sky Sports
24/9/15	S7	St. Helens	A	Langtree Park	W	32-16	Johnson, Monaghan, Hill, Atkins, Asotasi, Penny	Sandow 3/5, Monaghan 1/1	10,966	Sky Sports

=== Player appearances ===
- Super League Only

FB=Fullback	C=Centre	W=Winger	SO=Stand-off	SH=Scrum half	PR=Prop	H=Hooker	SR=Second Row	L=Loose forward	B=Bench

No	Player	1	2	3	4	5	6	7	8	9	10	11	12	13	14	15	16	17	18	19	20	21	22	23	S1	S2	S3	S4	S5	S6	S7
1	Matty Russell			FB	W	W	W	W	W												FB	FB	FB	FB							
2	Rhys Evans	W	W																						C	C					
3	Chris Bridge			C		SO	SO	SO	SO	C	C	C	C	C	B	C	C	C	C	SO											
4	Ryan Atkins	C	C	C		C	C	C	C	C				C	C	C	C	C	C	C	C	C	C	C		C	C	C	C	C	C
5	Joel Monaghan	C	C	W	C			C	C	W	W	W	W	W	W		W	W	W	W				W	W	W	W	W	W	W	W
6	Stefan Ratchford	FB	FB		FB	FB	FB	FB	FB	FB	FB	FB	FB	FB	FB	FB	FB	FB	FB	FB	C	L	C	C	FB	FB	FB	SO	SO	C	C
7	Richie Myler	SH	SH							SH	SH	SH	SH	SH	SH	SH	SH	SH	SH		SH	SH	SH	SH	SO	SO	SO			SO	SO
8	Chris Hill	P	P	P	P	P	P	P	P	P	P	P	P	P	B	P	P	P	P	P	P	P	P	P	L	P	P	P	P	P	P
9	Daryl Clark	H	H	H	H	H	H	H	B	B	B	B	B	B		H	H	H	H	H	H	H	H	H	H	H	H	H	H	H	H
10	Ashton Sims	P	P	P	P	P	P	P	P	P	B	B	P	B	P	P	P	P	P	P	P		P	P	P	P	P		B	P	P
11	Simon Grix																								x	x	x	x	x	x	x
12	Ben Westwood	L	L	L	L	L	L	L	SR	SR	SR	SR	SR	SR	SR	SR	SR	SR		SR	SR	SR	SR	SR		SR	SR	SR	SR	SR	SR
13	Ben Harrison	B	B	B					L	L	L	L	L	L	L	L	L	L	L	L	L	P	L	L		L	L	B	B	B	B
14	Micky Higham	B	B	B	B	B	B	B	H	H	H	H	H	H	H	x	x	x	x	x	x	x	x	x	x	x	x	x	x	x	x
15	Roy Asotasi	B		B	B	B	B	B	B	B	P	P	B	B	P	B	B		B	B	B	B	B	B	B	B	B	P	P	B	B
17	Ben Currie	SR	SR	SR	C	C	C	SR	SR	SR	SR	SR	SR	SR	SR	SR	SR	SR	SR				SR	SR	SR	SR	SR	SR	SR	SR	SR
18	James Laithwaite	SR	SR	SR	SR	SR	SR	SR	B	B	B	B	B	B	B	B	B	B	SR	SR											
19	Anthony England	x	x	x	x	x	x	x	B	B	B	B	B	P	B			B	B				B	B	P						
20	Gareth O'Brien	SO	SO	SO	SO	SH	SH	SH	SH	SO								SO	SO		SO	SO	SO	SO	x	x	x	x	x	x	x
21	Ben Evans	x	B	x	B	B	B																								
22	Gene Ormsby	x	x	x	x	x	x	x	x	x	W	W	W	W	W	W	W	W	W	W	W	W	W	W		x	x	x	x	x	x
23	Gary Wheeler	B	B	SH	SH																	C				B	C	C	C		
24	Kevin Penny	W	W	W	W	W	W	W	W	W						W					W	W	W		W	W	W	W	W	W	W
25	Brad Dwyer	x	x	x	x	x	x	x	x	x	x	x	x	x	x	B	B	B	B	B	B	B	B	B	B	B	B	B	B	B	B
26	Joe Philbin	x	x	B	SR	SR	SR	B	x	x	x	x	x	x	x	x	x	x	x	B	SR	SR	B		SR	x	B	B	x	B	B
27	George King	x	x	x	B	B	B	B	x	x	x	x	x	x	x	B	B	B	B	B	B				B	B	B	L	L	L	L
28	Toby King	x	x	x	x	x	x	x	x	x	C	C	C	x	C	x	x	x	x	C	x	B		x	C	x	x	x	x	x	x
29	Declan Patton	x	x	x	x	x	x	x	x	x	SO	SO	SO	SO	SO	SO	SO			SH						x	x	x	x	x	x
31	Sam Wilde	x	x	x	x	x	x	x	x	x	x	x	x	x	x	x	x	x	x	x	B	B		B	B	x	x	B	B	x	x
33	Chris Sandow	x	x	x	x	x	x	x	x	x	x	x	x	x	x	x	x	x	x	x	x	x	x	x	SH	SH	SH	SH	SH	SH	SH
34	Jack Johnson	x	x	x	x	x	x	x	x	x	x	x	x	x	x	x	x	x	x	x	x	x	x	x	x	x	x	FB	FB	FB	FB

= Injured

= Suspended

=== Challenge Cup ===
LEGEND
Win
Draw
Loss

Date	Round	Vrs	H/A	Venue	Result	Score	Tries	Goals	Att	TV
15/5/15	6th	Dewsbury	A	Rams Stadium	W	52-10	Dwyer, Atkins, Sims, Currie (2), Patton, Penny (2), Bridge, Myler	Bridge 6/10	1,771	-
27/6/15	QF	Leigh	H	Halliwell Jones Stadium	W	34-24	Sims, Currie (2), Penny (2), G.King	O'Brien 4/5, Westwood 1/1	10,119	BBC Sport
1/7/15	SF	Hull Kingston Rovers	N	Headingley Stadium	L	18-26	Atkins, Myler, Currie	O'Brien 3/3	13,049	BBC Sport

==== Player appearances ====
- Challenge Cup Games only

FB=Fullback	C=Centre	W=Winger	SO=Stand Off	SH=Scrum half	P=Prop	H=Hooker	SR=Second Row	L=Loose forward	B=Bench

No	Player	6	QF	SF
1	Matty Russell			
2	Rhys Evans			
3	Chris Bridge	C		
4	Ryan Atkins	C	C	C
5	Joel Monaghan	W		W
6	Stefan Ratchford	x	FB	FB
7	Richie Myler	SH	SH	SH
8	Chris Hill	P	P	P
9	Daryl Clark	x	H	H
10	Ashton Sims	P	P	P
11	Simon Grix			
12	Ben Westwood	SR	SR	Red card
13	Ben Harrison	L	L	L
14	Micky Higham		x	x
15	Roy Asotasi		B	B
17	Ben Currie	SR	SR	SR
18	James Laithwaite	B	C	
19	Anthony England	B		B
20	Gareth O'Brien	B	SO	SO
21	Ben Evans			
22	Gene Ormsby	W	W	W
23	Gary Wheeler			C
24	Kevin Penny	FB	W	
25	Brad Dwyer	H	B	B
26	Joe Philbin	x	B	B
27	George King	B	B	
28	Toby King	x	x	x
29	Declan Patton	SO	x	
31	Sam Wilde	x	x	SR

== 2015 squad statistics ==
- Appearances and points include (Super League, Challenge Cup and Play-offs) as of 24 September 2015.

No	Player	Position	Age	Previous club	Apps	Tries	Goals	DG	Points
1	Matty Russell	Fullback	N/A	Gold Coast Titans	10	4	0	0	16
2	Rhys Evans	Winger	N/A	Warrington Wolves Academy	5	1	0	0	4
3	Chris Bridge	Centre	N/A	Bradford Bulls	18	3	9	0	30
4	Ryan Atkins	Centre	N/A	Wakefield Trinity Wildcats	29	14	0	0	56
5	Joel Monaghan	Wing	N/A	Canberra Raiders	27	17	2	0	72
6	Stefan Ratchford	Stand off	N/A	Salford Red Devils	31	7	37	0	102
7	Richie Myler	Scrum half	N/A	Salford Red Devils	25	12	0	0	48
8	Chris Hill	Prop	N/A	Leigh Centurions	34	4	0	0	16
9	Daryl Clark	Hooker	N/A	Castleford Tigers	32	6	0	0	24
10	Ashton Sims	Prop	N/A	North Queensland Cowboys	32	4	0	0	16
11	Simon Grix	Second row	N/A	Halifax	0	0	0	0	0
12	Ben Westwood	Second row	N/A	Wakefield Trinity Wildcats	31	6	1	0	26
13	Ben Harrison	Loose forward	N/A	Warrington Wolves Academy	29	2	0	0	8
14	Micky Higham	Hooker	N/A	Wigan Warriors	15	2	0	0	8
15	Roy Asotasi	Second row	N/A	South Sydney Rabbitohs	30	3	1	0	14
17	Ben Currie	Second row	N/A	Warrington Wolves Academy	31	19	0	0	76
18	James Laithwaite	Second row	N/A	Warrington Wolves Academy	22	0	0	0	0
19	Anthony England	Prop	N/A	Featherstone Rovers	15	0	0	0	0
20	Gareth O'Brien	Scrum half	N/A	Warrington Wolves Academy	19	5	40	3	103
21	Ben Evans	Prop	N/A	Warrington Wolves Academy	4	0	0	0	0
22	Gene Ormsby	Wing	N/A	Swinton Lions	17	11	0	0	44
23	Gary Wheeler	Stand off	N/A	St Helens R.F.C.	11	4	0	0	16
24	Kevin Penny	Wing	N/A	Swinton Lions	23	16	0	0	64
25	Brad Dwyer	Hooker	N/A	Warrington Wolves Academy	19	2	0	0	8
26	Joe Philbin	Second row	N/A	Warrington Wolves Academy	16	3	0	0	12
27	George King	Second row	N/A	Warrington Wolves Academy	19	1	0	0	4
28	Toby King	Centre	N/A	Warrington Wolves Academy	7	2	0	0	8
29	Declan Patton	Stand off	N/A	Warrington Wolves Academy	9	1	1	1	7
31	Sam Wilde	Prop	N/A	Warrington Wolves Academy	7	1	0	0	4
33	Chris Sandow	Scrum half	N/A	Parramatta Eels	7	0	16	0	32
34	Jack Johnson	Fullback	N/A	Warrington Wolves Academy	4	3	0	0	12

= Injured = Suspended

== 2015 transfers in/out ==
In

Player	Signed from	Contract length	Date
(Fiji) Ashton Sims	North Queensland Cowboys	2 Years	July 2014
(England) Daryl Clark	Castleford Tigers	4 Years	August 2014
(England) Gary Wheeler	St. Helens	1 Year	October 2014

Out

Player	Signed for	Contract length	Date
(England) Brad Dwyer	London Broncos	1 Year (Loan)	September 2014
(England) Glenn Riley	London Broncos	1 Year	September 2014
(England) Chris Riley	Wakefield Trinity Wildcats	1 Year	September 2014
(Italy) James Saltonstall	Halifax	2 Years	October 2014
(Australia) Michael Monaghan	Catalans Dragons Assistant Coach	2 Years	October 2014
(Republic of Ireland) Danny Bridge	Rochdale Hornets	2 Years	October 2014
(Australia) Trent Waterhouse	Thirroul Butchers	3 Years	November 2014
(England) Paul Wood	Featherstone Rovers	2 Years	January 2015
(England) Tom Walker	Workington Town	1 Year	January 2015
(England) Jordan Burke			
(England) Gavin Bennion			
