= 2017 Warrington Wolves season =

- Super League XXII Rank: 9th
- Challenge Cup: Lost 26–27 to Wigan (Quarter final)
- 2017 record: Wins: 9; draws: 2; losses: 12
- Points scored: For: 422; against: 561

Team information
- Chairman: Steven Broomhead
- Head Coach: Tony Smith
- Captain: Chris Hill
- Stadium: Halliwell Jones Stadium
- Avg. attendance: 10,478
- High attendance: 11,681 v St. Helens 05/05/2017
- Low attendance: 9,152 v Wakefield 22/04/2017

Top scorers
- Tries: Lineham (16)
- Goals: Patton (25)
- Points: Lineham (64)
← 2016	List of seasons	2018 →

This article details the Warrington Wolves Rugby League Football Club's 2017 season. This is the Wolves' 22nd consecutive season in the Super League.

== Fixtures and results ==
=== Pre-season friendlies ===
LEGEND
Win
Draw
Loss

Date	Competition	Vrs	H/A	Venue	Result	Score	Tries	Goals	Att
27/12/2016	Pre Season	Widnes	A	Stobart Stadium	Won	28-18	Atkins, Evans, T. King, Kay, Livett	Livett (4)	3,752
27/01/2017	Pre Season	Rochdale Hornets	A	Manchester Regional Academy	Won	24-22	Clarke, Blythe, T. King, Dwyer, Jones	Livett (2)	500 (est)
01/02/2017	Testimonial	Huddersfield	H	Halliwell Jones Stadium	Lost	0-12			2,198

=== World Club Series ===
Date	Competition	Vrs	H/A	Venue	Result	Score	Tries	Goals	Att	Live on TV
18/02/2017	WCC	Brisbane	H	Halliwell Jones Stadium	Won	27-18	Brown, Atkins, Russell, Lineham	Patton (5), 1 DG	12,082	Sky Sports

=== Super League ===
==== Super League table ====
Pos	Team	Pld	W	D	L	PF	PA	PD	Pts	Qualification
1	Castleford Tigers	23	20	0	3	769	378	+391	40	Super League Super 8s
2	Leeds Rhinos	23	15	0	8	553	477	+76	30	Super League Super 8s
3	Hull F.C.	23	13	1	9	541	483	+58	27	Super League Super 8s
4	Salford Red Devils	23	13	0	10	576	500	+76	26	Super League Super 8s
5	Wakefield Trinity	23	13	0	10	572	509	+63	26	Super League Super 8s
6	St. Helens	23	12	1	10	516	420	+96	25	Super League Super 8s
7	Wigan Warriors	23	10	3	10	539	518	+21	23	Super League Super 8s
8	Huddersfield Giants	23	9	3	11	519	486	+33	21	Super League Super 8s
9	Warrington Wolves	23	9	2	12	426	557	−131	20	The Qualifiers
10	Catalans Dragons	23	7	1	15	469	689	−220	15	The Qualifiers
11	Leigh Centurions	23	6	0	17	425	615	−190	12	The Qualifiers
12	Widnes Vikings	23	5	1	17	359	632	−273	11	The Qualifiers

Source: Rugby League Project
Rules for classification: 1) Points; 2) Points difference; 3) Number of points scored;

==== Super League fixtures ====
Date	Competition	Vrs	H/A	Venue	Result	Score	Tries	Goals	Att	Live on TV
11/02/2017	Round 1	Catalans Dragons	A	Stade Gilbert Brutus	Lost	12-20	Savelio, Evans	Patton (2)	8,842	Sky Sports
24/02/2017	Round 2	Castleford	H	Halliwell Jones Stadium	Lost	22-30	Savelio (2), Lineham (2)	Patton (2), Livett	11,374	Sky Sports
04/03/2017	Round 3	Salford	A	AJ Bell Stadium	Lost	14-24	Patton, Hughes, Johnson	Patton	5,428	
09/03/2017	Round 4	Wigan	H	Halliwell Jones Stadium	Lost	16-38	Atkins, Evans, Lineham	Gidley (2)	11,250	Sky Sports
16/03/2017	Round 5	Leigh	A	Leigh Sports Village	Lost	8-22	Lineham	Gidley, Livett	7,011	Sky Sports
24/03/2017	Round 6	St. Helens	A	Langtree Park	Lost	6-31	Gidley	Gidley	11,598	Sky Sports
01/04/2017	Round 7	Hull F.C.	H	Halliwell Jones Stadium	Draw	22-22	Russell (3), Clark	Gidley (3)	10,676	
08/04/2017	Round 8	Leeds	H	Halliwell Jones Stadium	Won	25-12	Atkins (2), Lineham, Gidley	Patton (4), 1DG	10,035	Sky Sports
13/04/2017	Round 9	Widnes	A	Stobart Stadium	Won	19-10	Lineham, Hughes, Philbin	Patton (3), 1DG	8,279	Sky Sports
17/04/2017	Round 10	Huddersfield	H	Halliwell Jones Stadium	Won	26-24	Livett, Clark, Gidley, Evans, T King	Patton (3)	10,111	
22/04/2017	Round 11	Wakefield Trinity	H	Halliwell Jones Stadium	Won	22-20	Atkins, Hill, Brown, Lineham	Patton (3)	9,152	Sky Sports
28/04/2017	Round 12	Hull F.C.	A	KCOM Stadium	Lost	10-34	Russell, Westerman	Patton	10,734	Sky Sports
05/05/2017	Round 13	St. Helens	H	Halliwell Jones Stadium	Won	40-18	Jullian, Cooper, Evans, Atkins (2), Lineham, Livett	Livett (6)	11,681	Sky Sports
20/05/2017	Round 14	Wigan	N	St James Park, Newcastle United FC	Draw	24-24	Clark, Ratchford, Lineham, Hughes	Ratchford (4)	35,361	Sky Sports
26/05/2017	Round 15	Leeds	A	Headingley Stadium	Lost	0-40			14,974	Sky Sports
29/05/2017	Round 16	Salford	H	Halliwell Jones Stadium	Lost	12-38	Dwyer, Lineham	Patton (2)	10,684	
04/06/2017	Round 17	Huddersfield	A	The John Smith's Stadium	Lost	4-44	Lineham		5,362	
11/06/2017	Round 18	Castleford	A	The Mend A Hose Jungle	Lost	16-36	Lineham, Westerman, Hughes	Patton (2)	8,577	
24/06/2017	Round 19	Catalans Dragons	H	Halliwell Jones Stadium	Won	24-16	Jullian, Atkins (2), Savelio	Gidley (4)	9,798	
01/07/2017	Round 20	Wakefield Trinity	A	Belle Vue	Lost	26-12	Dwyer, Hill	Ratchford (2)	4,829	
07/07/2017	Round 21	Leigh	H	Halliwell Jones Stadium	Won	50-10	Atkins, Sims, Lineham (4), Pomeroy, Hughes, Patton	Ratchford (6), Westwood	10,597	
13/07/2017	Round 22	Wigan	A	DW Stadium	Won	16-10	Jullien, Atkins, Currie	Ratchford (2)	11,861	Sky Sports
20/07/2017	Round 23	Widnes	H	Halliwell Jones Stadium	Won	22-6	Russell (2), Hiku, Brown	Ratchford (3)	9,895	Sky Sports

=== Super League Super 8's - The Qualifiers ===
Date	Competition	Vrs	H/A	Venue	Result	Score	Tries	Goals	Att	Live on TV
04/08/2017	Round 1	Widnes	A	Select Security Stadium	Won	28-14	Hughes, Lineham, Patton, Russell, Hiku	Patton (4)	6,202	
12/08/2017	Round 2	Catalans Dragons	H	Halliwell Jones Stadium	Won	52-24	Ratchford (2), Russell, Patton, Atkins (2), Lineham (2), Hiku	Patton (8)	8,595	
19/08/2017	Round 3	Halifax	H	Halliwell Jones Stadium	Won	22–8	Hiku, Hill, Russell, Savelio	Patton (3)	8,353	Sky Sports
02/09/2017	Round 4	London Broncos	A	Trailfinders Sports Ground	Won	40-38	Lineham, King, Hiku, Brown 2, Patton, Westwood	Patton (6)	1,577	Sky Sports
09/09/2017	Round 5	Leigh	H	Halliwell Jones Stadium	Won	32-30	Russell, Westwood, Gidley, Brown, Hiku, Hill	Patton (3), Livett (2)	9,787	
17/09/2017	Round 6	Featherstone	A	L.D. Nutrition Stadium	Won	68-0	Hiku (3), Ratchford, Livett (2), Hughes (2), Pomeroy, Savelio, Johnson	Livett (10)	2,441	
23/09/2017	Round 7	Hull KR	H	Halliwell Jones Stadium	Won	46-24	Pomeroy 2, Savelio 2, Ratchford, Dwyer, Hiku, Currie, Livett	Livett (4), Gidley	10,466	

=== Challenge Cup ===
Date	Round	Vrs	H/A	Venue	Result	Score	Tries	Goals	Att	Live on TV
14/05/2017	Round 6	Widnes	H	Halliwell Jones Stadium	Won	34-20	Atkins, Brown (3), Russell, Hill	Ratchford (5)	5,971	BBC Two
17/06/2017	QF	Wigan	H	Halliwell Jones Stadium	Lost	26-27	Atkins (2), Savelio, Gidley	Patton (5)	7,312	BBC One

== Transfers ==
=== In ===
Player	Signed from	Contract length	Announced
(England) Michael Cooper	St. George Illawarra Dragons	3 Year	June 2016
(England) Matty Blythe	Bradford Bulls	1 Year	August 2016
(England) Dom Crosby	Wigan Warriors	2 Year	October 2016
(England) Andre Savelio	St Helens R.F.C.	1 Year	October 2016
(Australia) Ben Pomeroy	Lézignan Sangliers	End of season	June 2017
(New Zealand) Peta Hiku	Penrith Panthers	2 1/2 Years	June 2016

=== Out ===
Player	Signed for	Contract length	Announced
(Wales) Ben Evans	London Broncos	1 Year	September 2016
(Australia) Mitchell Dodds	Brisbane Broncos	1 Year	October 2016
(England) Jordan Cox	Released	-	October 2016
(England) Ryan Bailey	Released	-	October 2016
(Australia) Chris Sandow	Unknown		November 2016
