= Gareth O'Brien =

English professional rugby league footballer

Gaz O'Brien
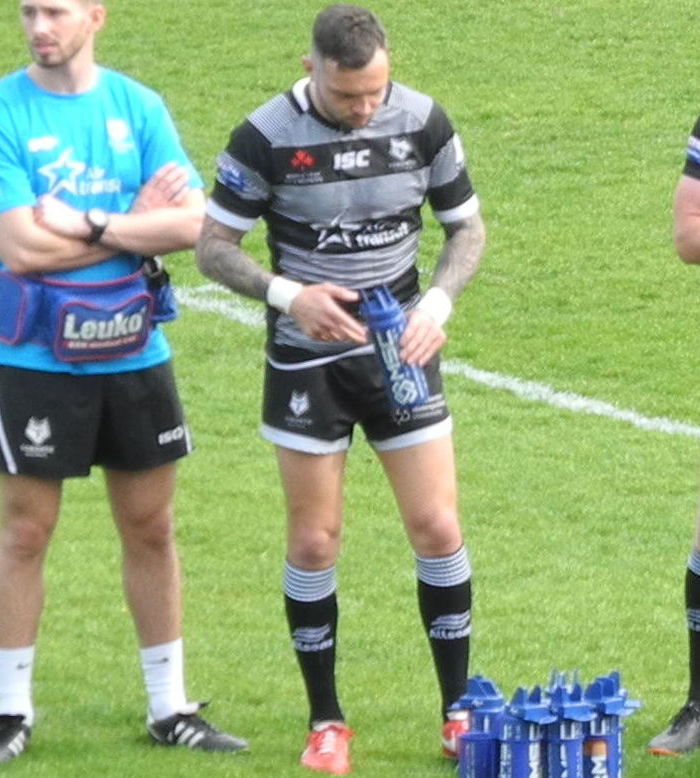

Personal information
- Full name: Gareth O'Brien
- Born: 31 October 1991 (age 34) Warrington, Cheshire, England
- Height: 5 ft 11 in (1.80 m)
- Weight: 10 st 8 lb (67 kg)

Playing information
- Position: Fullback, Stand-off, Scrum-half
Club
Years	Team	Pld	T	G	FG	P
2011–15	Warrington Wolves	62	19	78	3	235
2012(loan)	→ Widnes Vikings	4	0	15	0	30
2013(DR)	→ Swinton Lions	7	0	6	0	12
2013(loan)	→ Castleford Tigers	2	0	0	1	1
2013(loan)	→ St Helens	7	0	25	0	50
2014(DR)	→ Swinton Lions	8	2	34	2	78
2015(DR)	→ N Wales Crusaders	2	1	0	0	4
2016–18	Salford Red Devils	65	16	142	4	352
2018–20	Toronto Wolfpack	55	33	175	2	484
2020(loan)	→ Castleford Tigers	8	3	7	1	27
2021–22	Castleford Tigers	33	5	60	3	143
2023–	Leigh Leopards	72	11	69	4	190
	Total	325	90	611	20	1606
- Source: As of 30 August 2025

Gareth O'Brien (born 31 October 1991) is an English professional rugby league footballer who plays as a fullback, scrum-half or stand-off for the Leigh Leopards in the Super League.

He previously played for the Warrington Wolves and the Salford Red Devils in the Super League, and on loan from Warrington at the Widnes Vikings, Castleford Tigers and St Helens in the Super League, the Swinton Lions in the Championship and the North Wales Crusaders in League 1. O'Brien has also played for the Toronto Wolfpack in the Championship and the top flight, and on loan from Toronto at Castleford in Super League XXV. He later joined the Tigers on a permanent deal.

== Background ==
O'Brien was born in Warrington, Cheshire, England. He is of Irish descent.

He is a product of the Warrington academy; he was seen as the long-term replacement for Lee Briers.

O'Brien is the ambassador for the Rett syndrome research trust Reverse Rett, even posing as Mr. July in their Natural Wire Calendar, in which several players posed nude.

== Club career ==
=== Warrington Wolves ===
In the 2011 Season, O'Brien made his début in the 80-0 Challenge Cup win over Keighley; he marked his début with a try. He made his Super League début in Round 14 against Castleford, partnering Lee Briers as the half-backs. O'Brien steered the team to a 62–0 win, crossing the line for a try himself. He then featured in the record-breaking 112–0 home victory over the Swinton Lions in the 4th round of the Challenge Cup. An injury prevented him from playing for the rest of the season.

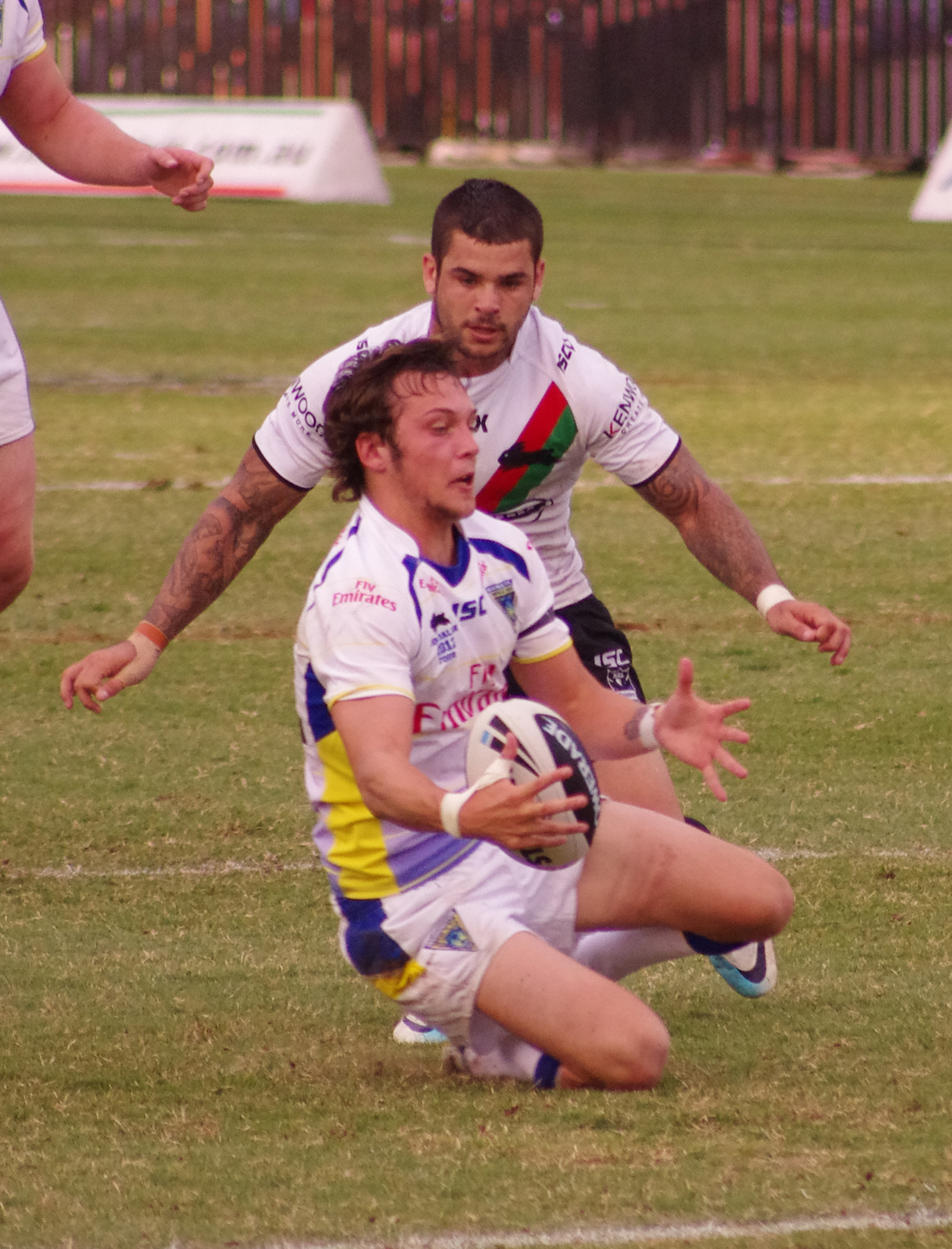
O'Brien playing for Warrington in 2012

In the 2012 Season, O'Brien featured in Round 10 (Widnes) then in Round 12 (Castleford) to Round 20 (Catalans) then in Round 22 (Bradford). He also featured in Round 4 and 5 and the quarter-final of the Challenge Cup against Keighley, Bradford and Catalans. He scored against Salford (8 goals), Widnes (10 goals), Hull KR (1 try), Leeds (2 tries, 1 goal), Hull F.C. (6 goals), Catalans (1 goal) and Bradford (2 goals).

In the 2013 Season, O'Brien featured in Round 7 (Salford) and Round 9 (Widnes). He featured in Round 5 of the Challenge Cup against Keighley. He scored against Salford (1 goal), Widnes (3 goals) and Keighley (1 try).

In the 2014 Season, O'Brien featured in Round 1 (St. Helens) to Round 6 (Wigan) then in Round 9 (Widnes) to Round 11 (Bradford Bulls) and in Round 18 (Bradford Bulls) to Round 27 (Wigan). O'Brien played in Round 5 (Doncaster) of the Challenge Cup. He also featured in the playoffs in the Elimination Play Off (Widnes) to the Qualifying Semi-final (Wigan). He scored against Widnes (1 try), Bradford Bulls (2 tries), Castleford (2 tries), Huddersfield (1 try, 4 goals) and St. Helens (1 try, 1 goal).

In the 2015 Season, O'Brien featured in the World Club Series against St George Illawarra Dragons. He scored against the Dragons (1 try, 2 goals). O'Brien featured in Round 1 (Salford) to Round 9 (Castleford). He played in Round 17 (Catalans Dragons) to Round 18 (Huddersfield) then in Round 20 (Wigan Warriors) to Round 23 (Castleford Tigers). O'Brien also featured in the Challenge Cup in Round 6 (Dewsbury) to the semi-final (Hull Kingston Rovers). He scored against Hull F.C. (1 goal, 1 drop goal), Catalans Dragons (6 goals), St. Helens (6 goals), Huddersfield (2 tries, 4 goals, 1 drop goal), Widnes (1 goal), Castleford (1 try, 5 goals), Leigh Centurions (4 goals), Wigan Warriors (1 try, 2 goals, 1 drop goal), Wakefield Trinity Wildcats (6 goals) and Hull Kingston Rovers (3 goals).

O'Brien was released by Warrington at the end of the 2015 season, alongside teammates Joel Monaghan and Roy Asotasi, as the club continue their on and off-field changes.

==== Widnes Vikings (loan) ====
In March 2012, O'Brien was sent out on loan for a month to Super League side Widnes Vikings. He made his début in Round 6 against Wigan where he kicked 6 goals to help the Chemics to a 37–36 victory. He played in Round 7 against Hull F.C. but could only manage a goal as Widnes slipped to a 58–10 defeat. He featured in Round 8 (London Broncos) and kicked 7 goals to help Widnes to a 38–30 win. O'Brien converted Widnes' only try in the 76–6 loss against Catalans Dragons in Round 9.

==== Swinton Lions (dual registration) ====
In 2013 and 2014, O'Brien played for the Swinton Lions in the Championship through their dual registration arrangement with Warrington. He made 7 appearances and scored 6 goals for the Lions in 2013, and made a further 8 appearances and scored 2 tries, 34 goals and 2 drop goals for the club in 2014.

==== Castleford Tigers (loan) ====
In February 2013, O'Brien joined the Castleford Tigers on a one-month loan deal. He was signed as cover for Tigers half-back Rangi Chase, who was serving a suspension. He made his début in Round 3 against the Bradford Bulls, and then featured in Round 4 against the Catalans Dragons when his final-moment drop goal earned a draw for Castleford. O'Brien's time at Castleford was cut short when he was recalled by Warrington following an injury to half-back Lee Briers.

==== St Helens (loan) ====
In May 2013, O'Brien joined St. Helens on a one-month loan deal. He made his début against Huddersfield, and kicked 2 goals in the 25–16 loss. He then featured against Bradford Bulls (5 goals). O'Brien then kicked 8 goals against the Salford City Reds, and 1 goal against Hull Kingston Rovers. He then kicked 6 goals in the 40–24 victory over the Castleford Tigers. O'Brien helped the Saints to a famous 22–16 victory over arch rivals Wigan Warriors by kicking 2 goals. He also kicked a goal in the 26–6 victory over the Catalans Dragons.

==== North Wales Crusaders (dual registration) ====
In May 2015, O'Brien played for the North Wales Crusaders in League 1 through their dual registration arrangement with Warrington. He made 2 appearances and scored 1 try.

=== Salford Red Devils ===
O'Brien joined the Salford Red Devils for the 2016 season and was assigned squad number 14. In the Million Pound Game against Hull KR, he scored an incredible near-halfway drop goal in golden-point extra time to secure Salford's place in Super League. In his first season with the club, he made 32 appearances and scored 6 tries, 87 goals and 1 drop goal.

On 1 March 2017 he signed a new three-year deal with Salford. In the 2017 season, O'Brien made 29 appearances and scored 9 tries, 47 goals and 3 drop goals. On 12 March 2018, having made 4 appearances and scored 1 try and 9 goals in the 2018 season, it was announced that O'Brien would leave Salford to join Toronto Wolfpack with immediate effect.

=== Toronto Wolfpack ===
O'Brien joined Toronto Wolfpack in the Championship for an undisclosed fee on 12 March 2018. He said he "was really impressed" by the club and that joining the Wolfpack was an opportunity he couldn't afford to turn down. He made his début against Rochdale in a 17–18 victory. In his first season at the club, he made 24 appearances and scored 12 tries, 68 goals and 2 drop goals.

In the 2019 season, O'Brien made 27 appearances and scored 20 tries and 99 goals. This included 2 conversions in the Championship play-off final victory over Featherstone Rovers, to win promotion to Super League.

O'Brien had made 5 appearances and scored 1 try and 7 goals for Toronto when the 2020 season was suspended due to the COVID-19 pandemic. After Toronto were forced to withdraw from the 2020 competition, players were allowed to find new clubs for the rest of the season so he joined Castleford on loan.

==== Castleford Tigers (loan) ====
On 10 August 2020, Castleford Tigers announced the signing of O'Brien on a loan deal for the remainder of the 2020 season. He arrived as a direct replacement for full-back Jordan Rankin who had been released during the season suspension to allow him to return to Australia. Head coach Daryl Powell likened his abilities to those of Castleford fan favourite Luke Dorn: "he can see things very quickly, his communication is great, he has got pace and his decision-making is excellent."

O'Brien made 8 appearances throughout the remainder of the season, playing at fullback and scrum-half. He scored 3 tries, 7 goals and 1 drop goal in this time.

=== Castleford Tigers ===
Castleford announced the permanent signing of O'Brien on a three-year deal on 15 November 2020, after Toronto were denied readmission to Super League. His addition provided tough competition for the full-back and half-back positions occupied by Niall Evalds, Jake Trueman and Danny Richardson - O'Brien said, "I'll be putting everyone on their toes, it's healthy and helps the competition that a squad needs. I'm looking forward to it." O'Brien was originally assigned squad number 16 for 2021, but he requested that this was changed to number 31 for personal reasons prior to the beginning of the season. In Castleford's round 3 Challenge Cup match against Hull KR, O'Brien kicked a 99th-minute drop goal to secure a victory for the Tigers in the fourth period of golden point extra time. On 17 July 2021, he played for Castleford in their 2021 Challenge Cup Final loss against St. Helens.

=== Leigh ===
On 20 October 2022, O'Brien signed a contract to join the newly promoted and rebranded Leigh side. On 12 August 2023, O'Brien played for Leigh in their 17-16 Challenge Cup final victory over Hull Kingston Rovers. O'Brien played 27 games for Leigh in the 2023 Super League season as the club finished fifth on the table and qualified for the playoffs. He played in their elimination playoff loss against Hull Kington Rovers. O'Brien played 19 games for Leigh in the 2024 Super League season which saw the club finish fifth on the table. O'Brien played in the clubs semi-final loss to Wigan.

In round 1 of the 2025 Super League season, O'Brien kicked the winning drop goal for Leigh as they defeated rivals Wigan 1-0 in golden point extra-time. The match had finished 0-0 after 80 minutes, the first time in Super League history.

== International career ==
In 2016 he was called up to the Ireland squad for the 2017 Rugby League World Cup European Pool B qualifiers.
