= Kevin Penny =

English rugby league footballer

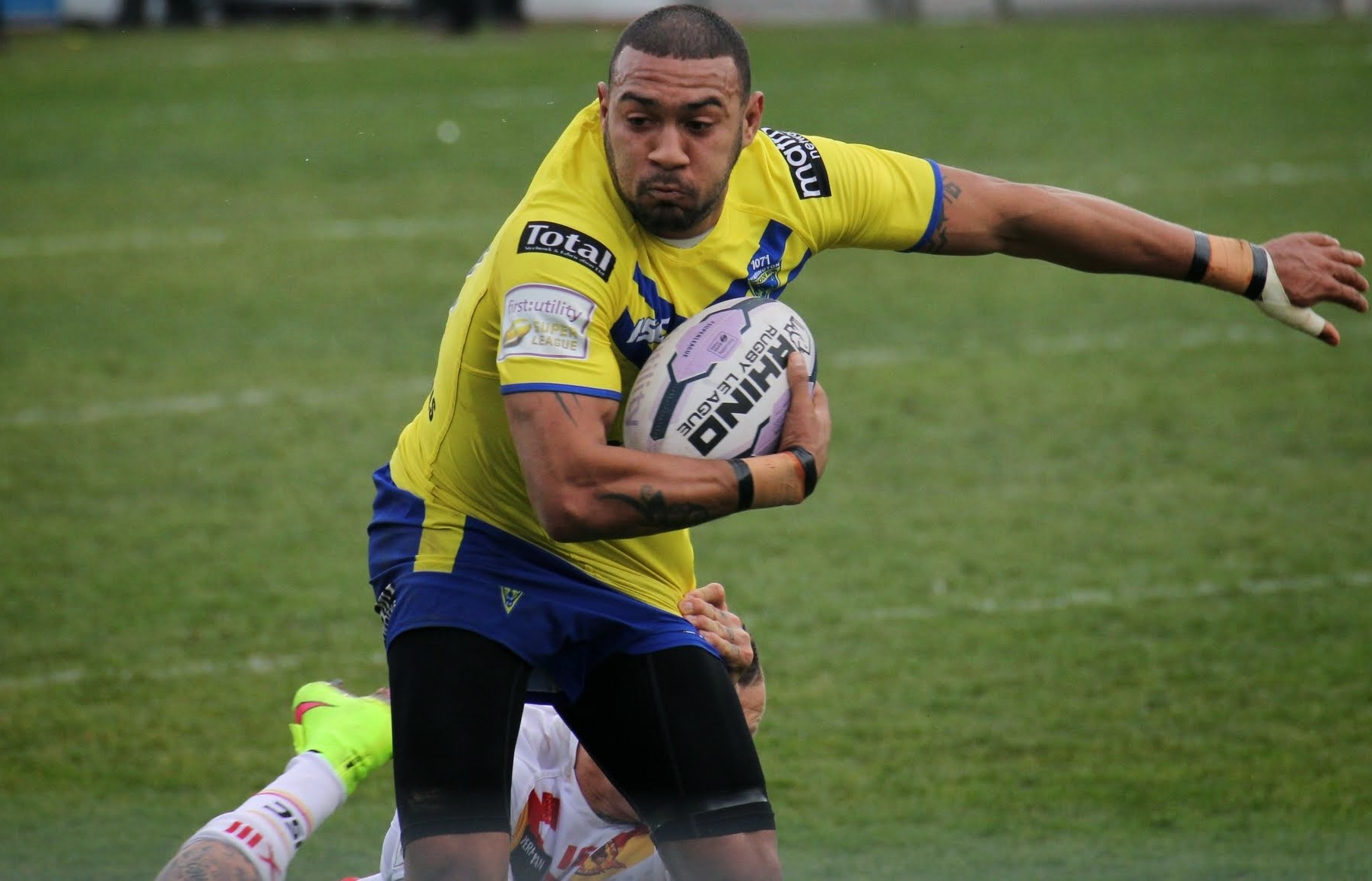

Personal information
- Full name: Kevin Penny Junior
- Born: 3 October 1987 (age 38) Warrington, Cheshire, England
- Height: 5 ft 10 in (1.78 m)
- Weight: 12 st 11 lb (81 kg)

Playing information
- Position: Wing
Club
Years	Team	Pld	T	G	FG	P
2006–10	Warrington Wolves	43	29	0	0	116
2009(loan)	→ Widnes Vikings	11	11	0	0	44
2010(loan)	→ Harlequins RL	5	3	0	0	12
2011	Wakefield Trinity Wildcats	5	1	0	0	4
2011(loan)	→ Widnes Vikings	11	6	0	0	24
2012–13	Swinton Lions	40	19	0	0	76
2014–17	Warrington Wolves	50	34	0	0	136
2014(loan)	→ Swinton Lions	14	12	0	0	48
2015(loan)	→ North Wales Crusaders	4	3	0	0	12
2016(loan)	→ Rochdale Hornets	1	1	0	0	4
2017(loan)	→ Rochdale Hornets	10	4	0	0	16
	Total	194	123	0	0	492
- Source: As of 16 August 2022

Kevin Penny is an English former professional rugby league footballer who played as a winger in the 2000s and 2010s.

He played for the Warrington Wolves and the Wakefield Trinity Wildcats in the Super League, on loan for Harlequins RL and for the Widnes Vikings and the Swinton Lions in rugby league's Championship.

== Early career ==
Born in Warrington, Penny attended Padgate High School and Priestley College. He joined Warrington's academy in 2005 after being spotted playing rugby at school.

== Club career ==
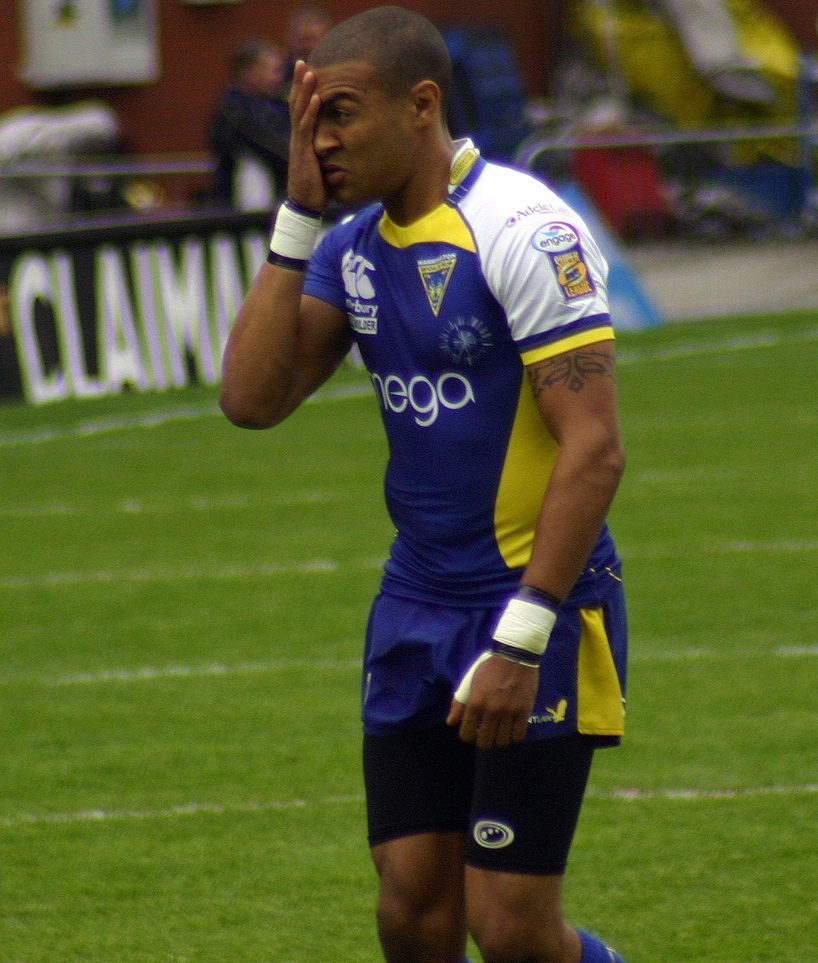
Penny during his first spell with Warrington

=== Warrington Wolves ===
Kevin made his senior début For Warrington against the Leeds on 1 June 2007, scoring two tries in a 42 - 26 defeat. Shortly after his début he received the engage Super League player of the month award for his efforts during the month of July 2007, despite starting the month with only 5 first grade games next to his name. He scored 5 tries in just 3 games during the month, 3 of which were scored in the space of just 9 minutes against Salford. Penny ended 2007 with 15 tries in 15 games and was named in the 2007 Super League Dream Team

Kevin was given the number 5 jersey for 2008 after a strong début season and played outside Australian international Matt King, but failed to impress and found himself out of the team.

On 26 August 2009, Kevin competed for the title of Fastest Man in Rugby League as part of a curtain raising competition at the Carnegie Floodlit Nines.

=== Widnes Vikings ===
On 21 May 2009 Kevin was loaned out to Championship side Widnes after failing to force his way into Warrington's first team squad under new coach Tony Smith.

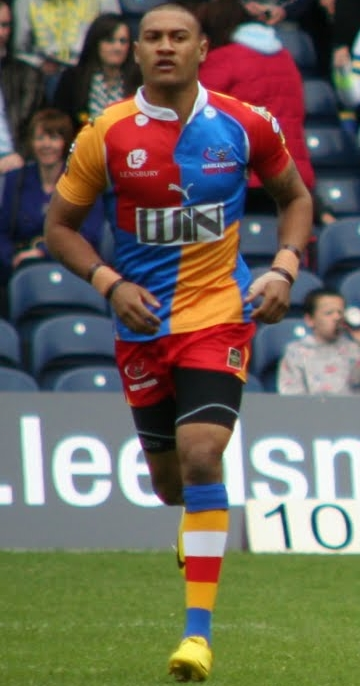
Penny in action for Harlequins RL

=== Harlequins Rugby League ===
In 2010, Penny was loaned to Harlequins RL, scoring three tries in five matches before returning to his parent club.

=== Wakefield Trinity Wildcats ===
Penny was released by Warrington at the end of 2010 and joined Wakefield Trinity Wildcats for 2011, but once again failed to make an impression and was loaned out to Widnes Vikings.

=== Swinton Lions ===
Kevin Penny joined Swinton Lions when Lions coach Steve McCormack signed him in November 2011 during the club's close-season player recruitment drive for the 2012 season.

=== Return to Warrington ===
Penny re-signed with Warrington in 2014 and made his second début for the club against Castleford Tigers. Prior to his return Penny said he was determined to make the most out of his second chance and was aiming to give the Wolves 'value'. Despite spending some time on loan at Swinton and North Wales Crusaders, Penny displayed good form for Warrington and established himself in the club's first team. He played 23 matches and scored 16 tries in 2015, his best return since his début season, and signed a new two-year deal at the end of the year.

=== Swinton ===
Penny spent time on loan at Swinton in 2014.

=== North Wales Crusaders ===
Penny spent time on loan at the North Wales Crusaders in 2015.

=== Rochdale Hornets ===
Penny spent time on loan at the Rochdale Hornets in 2016 and 2017.
