= Jordan Cox (rugby league) =

English rugby league footballer (1992–2020)

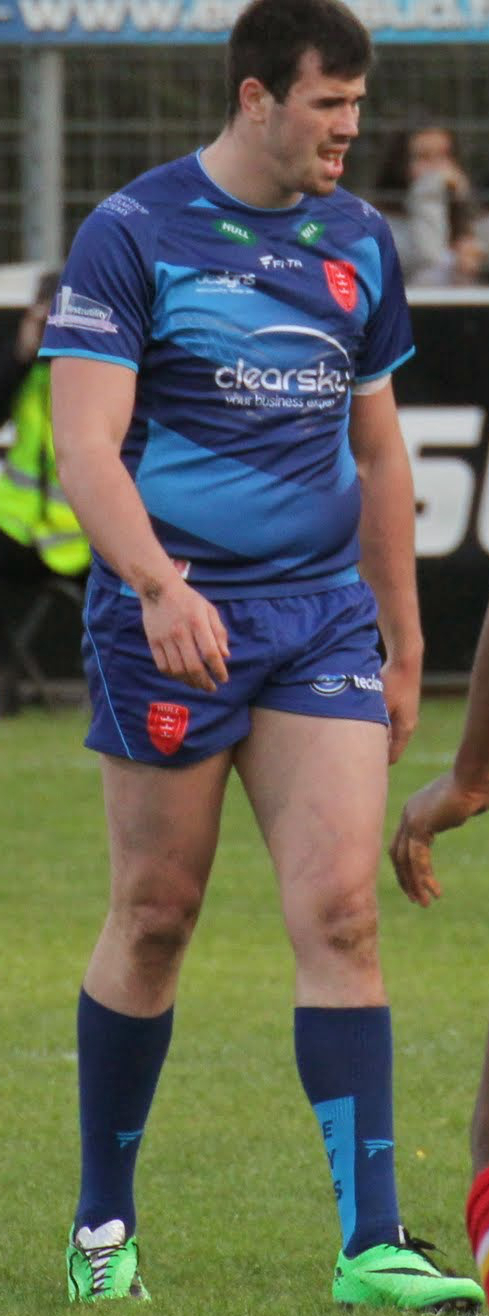

Personal information
- Full name: Jordan Cox
- Born: 27 May 1992 Hull, Humberside, England
- Died: 30 April 2020 (aged 27) Hull, East Riding of Yorkshire, England

Playing information
- Height: 194 cm (6 ft 4 in)
- Weight: 114 kg (17 st 13 lb)
- Position: Prop
Club
Years	Team	Pld	T	G	FG	P
2011–15	Hull Kingston Rovers	78	12	0	0	48
2013–14	→ Newcastle Thunder(DR)	2	0	0	0	0
2015(loan)	→ Huddersfield Giants	4	0	0	0	0
2015(DR)	→ Halifax	1	0	0	0	0
2016	Warrington Wolves	27	5	0	0	0
2017	Sheffield Eagles	9	0	0	0	0
2017(loan)	→ York City Knights	4	1	0	0	4
2019–20	Doncaster	3	1	0	0	0
	Total	128	19	0	0	52
- Source: As of 15 October 2019

Jordan Cox (27 May 1992 – 30 April 2020) was an English rugby league footballer who last played for Doncaster. His main position was prop.

He had also played in the Super League for Hull Kingston Rovers, the Huddersfield Giants and the Warrington Wolves. He had also appeared for Newcastle Thunder, Halifax and the Sheffield Eagles outside of the Super League.

== Career ==
Cox made his first team debut for Hull Kingston Rovers on 8 May 2011 away to York City Knights, in the 2011 Challenge Cup. On his début he looked confident and managed to get himself onto the scoresheet twice, after making his debut in the Challenge Cup he then went on to make a further 6 appearances in the Super League competition, earning himself a call up to the England Knights squad, which he later had to pull out of for post-season surgery.

At the start of the 2012 season, Cox played in 8 of the first 12 games earning himself a regular spot in the Hull Kingston Rovers starting 17, until the beginning of May. When during an U20s game, his spleen ruptured causing him to miss 3 months of the season. However, although it was initially thought of as a season-ending injury, he quickly progressed through the rest and rehab stages and later made his comeback against the Bradford Bulls.

Between 2013 and 2015 Cox played for Newcastle Thunder, Halifax and the Huddersfield Giants on loan. After being signed, he made 18 appearances for the Warrington Wolves; again in the Super League.

Cox penned a one-year deal with Championship outfit Sheffield Eagles in January 2017. After playing 9 games in 2017 for the Sheffield Eagles, Cox joined League 1 side York City Knights on loan until the end of the season. He scored on his debut for them in a 28-18 home victory against Workington Town. At the end of the season Cox was released by the Sheffield Eagles.

== Personal life ==
Cox died at his home in Hull on 30 April 2020, aged 27. No cause of death was made public at the time of his death, but the circumstances were described as "non-suspicious". An inquest in January 2021 was informed that death was due to an accidental drug overdose.
