= Jack Johnson (rugby league) =

English rugby league player

Personal information
- Full name: Jack Johnson
- Born: 1 July 1999 (age 26) Audenshaw, Greater Manchester, England
- Height: 5 ft 8 in (1.73 m)
- Weight: 13 st 12 lb (88 kg)

Playing information
- Position: Fullback, Wing
Club
Years	Team	Pld	T	G	FG	P
2015–19	Warrington Wolves	18	7	0	0	28
2016(loan)	→ Rochdale Hornets	2	1	0	0	4
2017(loan)	→ Rochdale Hornets	2	1	0	0	4
2017(loan)	→ Widnes Vikings	3	1	0	0	4
2018(loan)	→ Rochdale Hornets	1	0	0	0	0
2019(loan)	→ Rochdale Hornets	5	0	0	0	0
2019	Featherstone Rovers	8	2	0	0	8
2020–20	Widnes Vikings	7	5	0	0	20
2021–23	Newcastle Thunder	24	14	0	0	58
2024–25	Oldham RLFC	34	16	0	0	64
	Total	104	47	0	0	190
- Source: As of 20 March 2026

Jack Johnson (born 1 July 1999) is an English professional rugby league footballer who last played as a fullback or on the wing for Oldham RLFC in the RFL Championship.

He previously played for the Warrington Wolves in the Super League, and spent time on loan from Warrington at the Rochdale Hornets in League 1 and the Championship. Johnson also spent time on loan from the Wolves at Widnes in the Super League, and joined Featherstone Rovers towards the end of the 2019 Championship season.

== Background ==
Johnson was born in Audenshaw, Manchester, England.

== Career ==
=== Warrington Wolves ===
Johnson made his début for the Warrington Wolves in the Super League match against Hull F.C. on 6 September 2015.

=== Widnes Vikings ===
On 19 August 2020 it was announced that Johnson would be leaving Widnes at the end of the 2020 season.

=== Newcastle Thunder ===
On 26 November 2020, it was reported that he had signed for Newcastle Thunder in the RFL Championship.

=== Oldham RLFC ===
On 9 October 2023 it was reported he had signed a two-year deal at Oldham RLFC
