= Ashton Sims =

Former Fiji international rugby league footballer

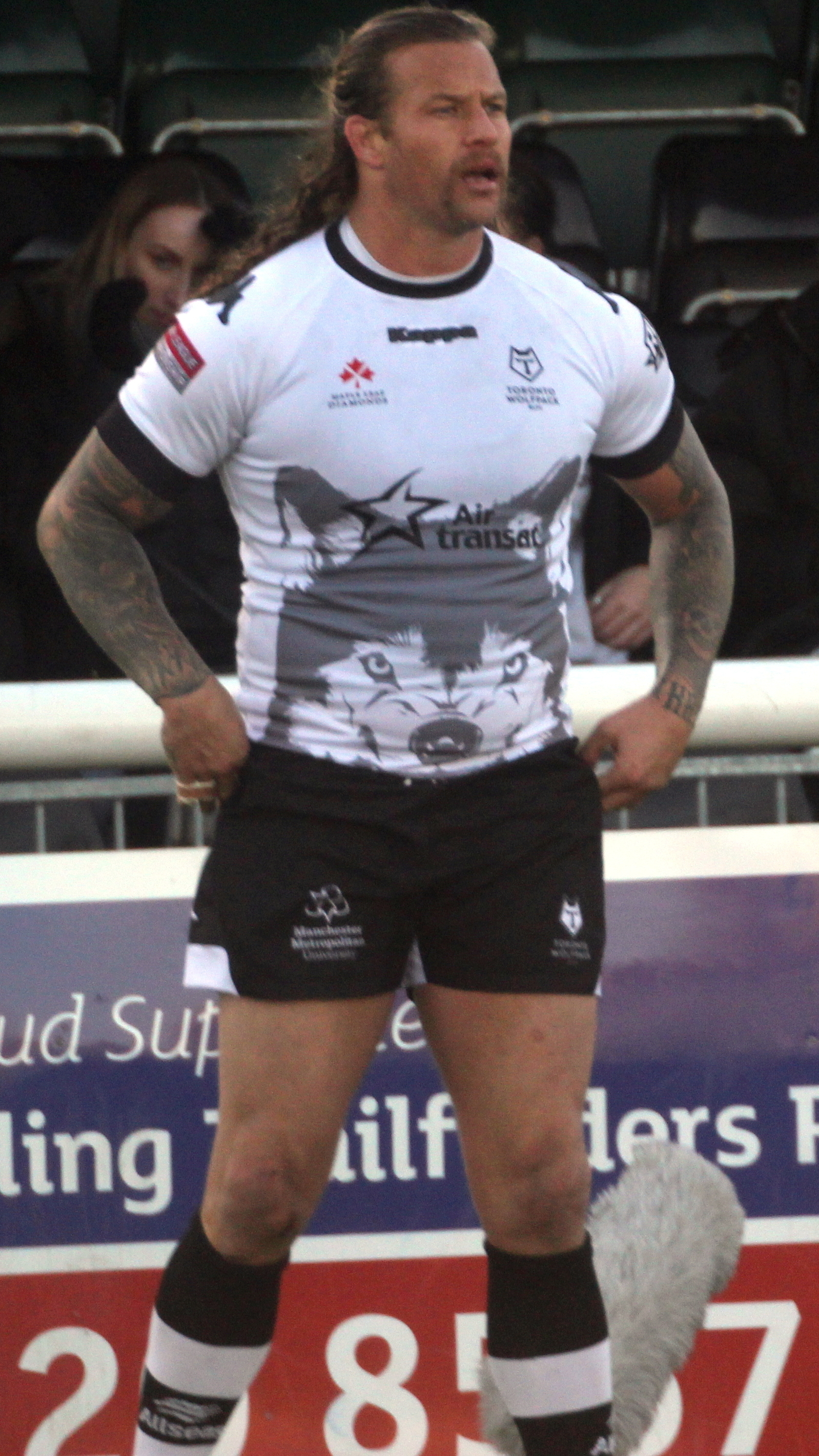

Personal information
- Born: 26 February 1985 (age 41) Sutherland, New South Wales, Australia

Playing information
- Height: 193 cm (6 ft 4 in)
- Weight: 111 kg (17 st 7 lb)
- Position: Prop, Second-row
Club
Years	Team	Pld	T	G	FG	P
2003–07	St. George Illawarra	81	9	0	0	36
2008–10	Brisbane Broncos	56	2	0	0	8
2011–14	North Qld Cowboys	91	2	0	0	8
2015–17	Warrington Wolves	90	7	0	0	28
2018–19	Toronto Wolfpack	50	1	0	0	4
	Total	368	21	0	0	84
Representative
Years	Team	Pld	T	G	FG	P
2008–17	Fiji	12	0	0	0	0
- Relatives: Korbin Sims (brother); Tariq Sims (brother); Ruan Sims (sister); Reagan Campbell-Gillard (cousin)

Ashton Sims (born 26 February 1985) is a former Fiji international rugby league footballer who played in the 2000s and 2010s. He played at club level for the St. George Illawarra Dragons, Brisbane Broncos and the North Queensland Cowboys in the National Rugby League (NRL), the Warrington Wolves in the Super League and the Toronto Wolfpack in the Championship, as a forward

== Background ==
He is an Australian-born Fijian of iTaukei descent. He was born in Sutherland, New South Wales, located in the Sydney suburbs of Australia.

== Playing career ==
While attending Kiama High School in 2002, Sims was selected to play for the Australian Schoolboys team. He played his junior football for the Gerringong Lions.

=== St. George-Illawarra Dragons ===
Sims played for his local NRL club, St George Illawarra Dragons, from 2003 to 2007, making his NRL début against the Penrith Panthers in round nine of the 2003 season. In 2004 he suffered a suspected broken jaw, having been elbowed in a wayward shoulder charge by Newcastle's Clint Newton. Newton was sent off and suspended for twelve weeks. Sims however managed to play out the game. During the 2007 season, the Dragons told Sims he was no longer wanted at the club, and he signed for the Brisbane Broncos on a three-year contract starting in 2008. He played 81 NRL matches for the Dragons over five seasons.

=== Brisbane Broncos ===
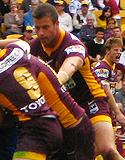
Sims in action for Broncos

Sims made his Brisbane Broncos début in the Round 1, 2008 clash against reigning wooden spooners, the Penrith Panthers, in a 48–12 win. Later that year, an elimination semi-final against the Melbourne Storm, Sims started the match in the back-row. The Broncos were leading at the time, but went on to lose the game in the final minute, after Sims dropped the ball with two minutes remaining in the match, which led to the match winning try by Greg Inglis. Sims described it as "one of the low points" of his career. Sims played almost 60 games for the club and was one of the club's highest paid players, he played in the back-row and in the front row during his time at the Broncos.

Shortly after the Broncos' semi-final exit, Sims was named in the Fiji squad for the 2008 Rugby League World Cup and was later confirmed for the final squad. He had only visited Fiji once in his life—for a holiday—but qualified to play for the country because his mother was born there. He was Fiji's starting second-rower for all four of their matches; Fiji qualified for the tournament's semi-final for the first time.

Sims fell out of the Broncos' starting line-up early in the 2009 season, finding himself playing for the Norths Devils in the Queensland Cup. He was recalled to the Broncos' first thirteen for the team's finals campaign, in which they fell one match short of qualifying for the Grand Final. However, he only played nine NRL matches in the following season, and in August signed to play for the North Queensland Cowboys in 2011.

=== North Queensland Cowboys ===
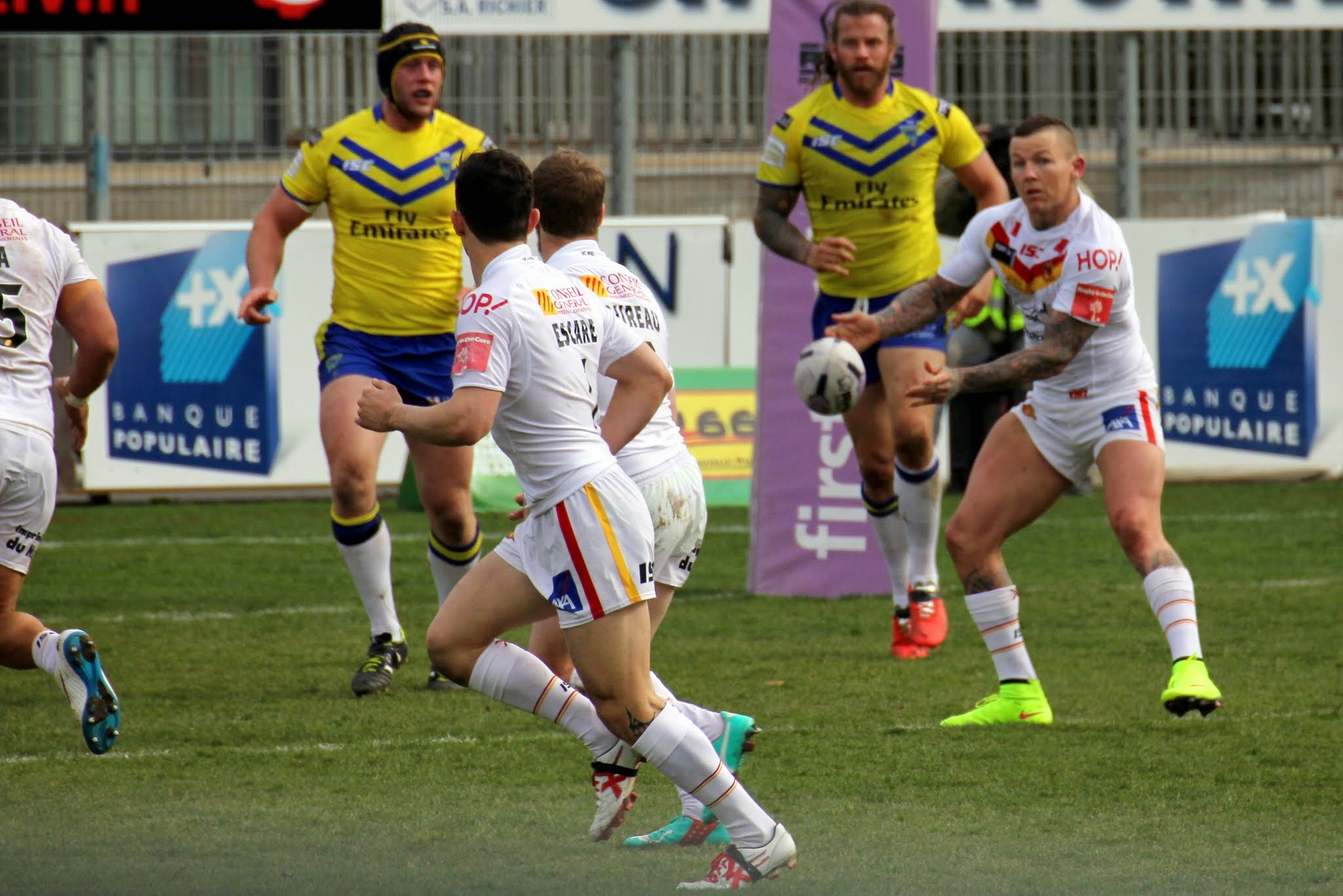
Sims in action for Warrington

Sims moved to North Queensland with his younger brother, Tariq, who had played in the Broncos' Under-20s team. He played in 24 matches for the Cowboys in the 2011 season, and was a substitute for their qualifying final loss to Manly. Ashton Sims led the way for NRL props in offloads in 2011, making 42 to his teammates.

Sims hit career best form for the Cowboys in 2012 averaging 108 metres and 22 tackles. He was in the Cowboys starting pack while rep star Matthew Scott was out with a foot injury.

On 11 May 2012, it was announced that the oldest Sims brother had re-signed with the club for a further two seasons, which saw him at the club until the end of the 2014 NRL season.

=== Warrington Wolves ===
Sims signed for Warrington Wolves ready for the 'New Era' of Super League in 2015, with a reformatted competition. Whilst at Warrington Wolves he received a League Leaders Winners medal and Runners up Medals for the 2016 Challenge Cup Final defeat by Hull F.C. at Wembley Stadium and the 2016 Super League Grand Final defeat by the Wigan Warriors at Old Trafford.

=== Toronto Wolfpack ===
Sims signed for Toronto Wolfpack following the 2017 Super League season. The Canadian side played in the Championship in 2018 following their League 1 title in their inaugural season in 2017.

== Representative career ==
Ashton represented Fiji in the 2013 Rugby League World Cup. He appeared in all 5 of Fiji's matches.

In May 2014, Ashton captained Fiji in the 2014 Pacific Test against Samoa. Fiji failed to win the test match and in doing so, failed to qualify for the 2014 Four Nations. In October 2017, Ashton represented Fiji once again in the World Cup, held in his home country Australia. There, Fiji beat New Zealand in the Quarter Finals but unfortunately suffered a loss in the semifinals to Australia and cousin – Reagan Campbell-Gillard.

== Personal life ==
Sims is the older brother of fellow rugby league players Korbin and Tariq Sims. His elder sister Ruan Sims played for the Australian women's team in 2010. He is married to Nicole Sims and father of 4 children.
