= James Laithwaite =

English rugby league footballer

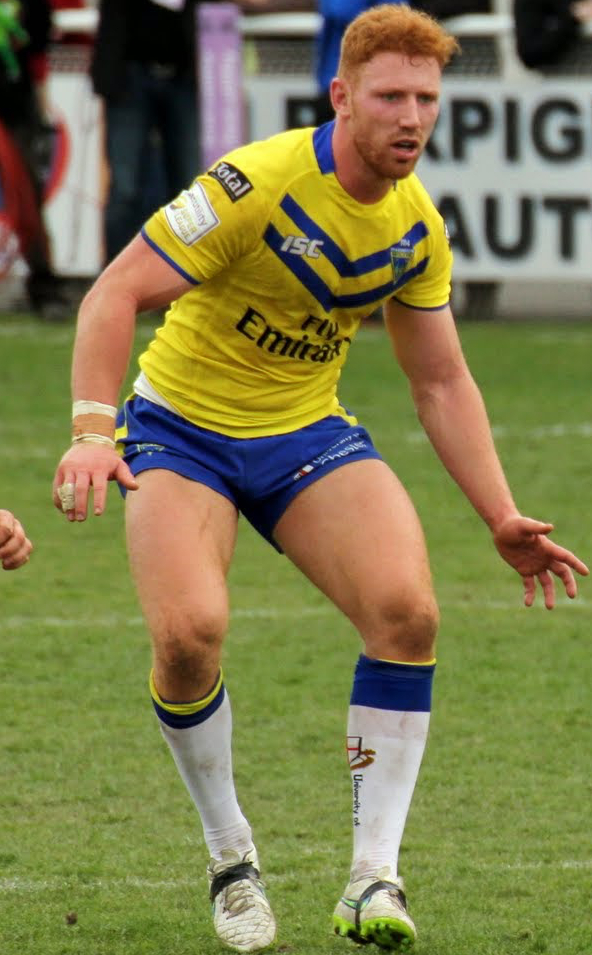

Personal information
- Full name: James Laithwaite
- Born: 23 September 1991 (age 35)

Playing information
- Height: 6 ft 2 in (1.88 m)
- Weight: 15 st 13 lb (101 kg)
- Position: Second-row
Club
Years	Team	Pld	T	G	FG	P
2012–16	Warrington Wolves	49	1	0	0	4
2012(loan)	→ Hull Kingston Rovers	3	1	0	0	4
2012(DR)	→ Leigh Centurions	11	3	0	0	12
2013(DR)	→ Swinton Lions	9	1	0	0	4
2017–18	Toronto Wolfpack	19	2	0	0	8
2018(loan)	→ Bradford Bulls	12	4	0	0	16
	Total	103	12	0	0	48

James Laithwaite (born 23 September 1991) is an English former professional rugby league footballer who last played for the Leigh Centurions in the Championship and the Bradford Bulls in League 1.

He previously played for the Warrington Wolves in the Super League.

== Club career ==
Laithwaite started his career at Warrington Wolves. He made his Super League début on loan with Hull Kingston Rovers during 2012. In 2012 he was also dual registered, and played for Leigh. He eventually made his début for Warrington against Hull KR in March 2013. A similar dual registration with Swinton for the 2013 season followed during which Laithwaite broke his ankle playing against Featherstone Rovers on 1 April 2013.

Laithwaite suffered a broken leg in June 2015 which ruled him out for the 2016 Super League season. In July 2016 it was announced that he would be joining Toronto Wolfpack for the 2017 season.

In 2018 he was dual registered with the Bradford Bulls in the 2018 RFL League 1 where he made 12 appearances and scored 4 tries, however his season was cut short when he suffered a broken leg in the 36–16 victory over Hunslet R.L.F.C. Following this, Laithwaite announced his retirement from rugby league at the age of 27 to focus on his business career.

== Retirement ==
In 2019, at the age of 27, after suffering a fourth leg break during his time at Bradford, he decided to retire; and has gone into the healthy food business with his partner, Michelle McDowall.
