= Ben Currie =

England and Ireland international rugby league footballer

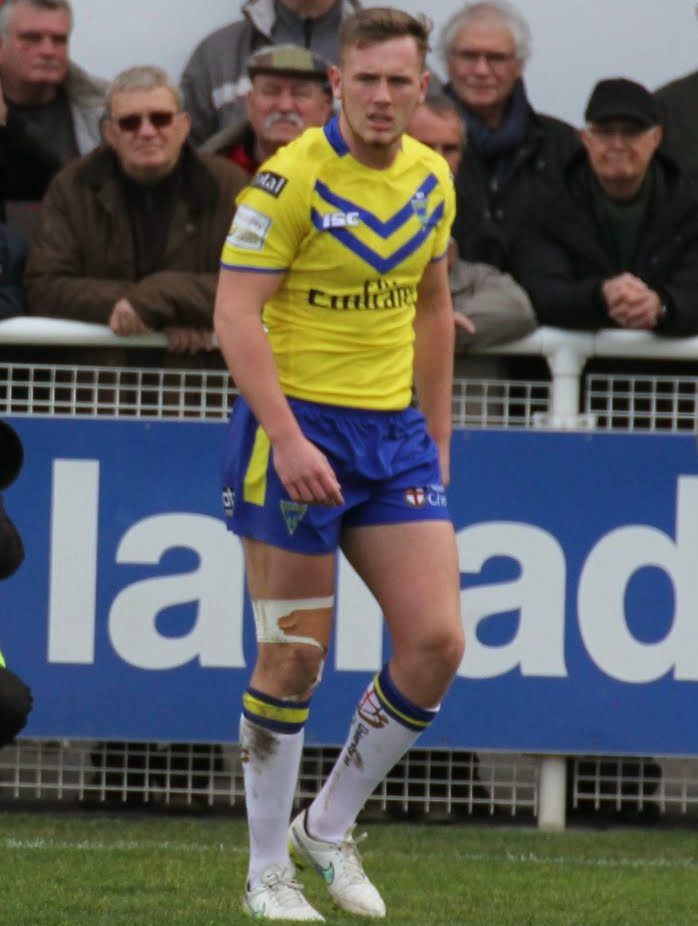

Personal information
- Born: 15 July 1994 (age 32) Lowton, Greater Manchester, England
- Height: 6 ft 2 in (1.88 m)
- Weight: 16 st 1 lb (102 kg)

Playing information
- Position: Second-row, Loose forward, Centre
Club
Years	Team	Pld	T	G	FG	P
2012–	Warrington Wolves	275	95	0	0	380
2013(loan)	→ Swinton Lions	1	2	0	0	8
2014(loan)	→ Swinton Lions	2	3	0	0	12
	Total	278	100	0	0	400
Representative
Years	Team	Pld	T	G	FG	P
2012	England Knights	1	0	0	0	0
2013	Ireland	3	0	0	0	0
2017–	England	10	3	0	0	12
- Source: As of 19 November 2026

Ben Currie (born 15 July 1994) is a professional rugby league footballer who plays as a loose forward for the Warrington Wolves in the Super League. He has played for the England Knights, Ireland and England at international level.

Currie has spent time on loan from Warrington at the Swinton Lions in the Championship.

== Background ==
Currie was born in Lowton, Greater Manchester, England. He attended Golborne High School for his secondary education

== Club career ==
Currie played his junior rugby at Golborne Parkside before signing with the Warrington Wolves. He made his début for Warrington in April 2012, aged 17, in a 46–12 victory over the Widnes Vikings. He scored his first senior try a month later against Salford City Reds.

In 2013, he played one game for Swinton Lions on a dual-registration deal, scoring two tries against the Sheffield Eagles. He made two further appearances for Swinton in 2014, scoring a hat trick against Barrow Raiders.

In June 2015, Currie signed a new four-year contract with Warrington.

He played in the 2016 Challenge Cup Final defeat by Hull F.C. at Wembley Stadium.

In September 2016, Currie suffered a torn anterior cruciate ligament, ruling him out for most of the 2017 season. Despite the injury, he was named in the 2016 Super League Dream Team for his performances during the season, and was rewarded with a new contract at Warrington, keeping him at the club until 2020.

He returned to action in July 2017, but suffered another injury to the same knee in his second game after returning to the side. He was able to recover before the end of the season, playing two games for Warrington in the 2017 Qualifiers.

He played in the 2019 Challenge Cup Final victory over St Helens at Wembley Stadium.

Currie was granted a testimonial by Warrington, which took place prior to the 2023 season. Currie played 28 games for Warrington in the 2023 Super League season as Warrington finished sixth on the table and qualified for the playoffs. Currie played in the clubs elimination playoff loss against St Helens. On 8 June 2024, Currie played in Warrington's 2024 Challenge Cup final defeat against Wigan. On 7 June 2025, Currie played in Warrington's 8-6 Challenge Cup final loss against Hull Kingston Rovers.

On 3 October 2026, Currie played in the 2026 Super League Grand Final, which Warrington lost to Wakefield Trinity 23-10.

== International career ==
Currie made his international début for Ireland in the 2013 Rugby League World Cup, and played in all three of their group games.

In 2015, Currie was selected by Steve McNamara to represent England for their test series against New Zealand but did not make an appearance.

In 2017, he was one of two uncapped players to be named in England's World Cup squad. He made his début for England in the opening game against Australia as a substitute after being named in the team as a late replacement for Alex Walmsley, who was ruled out due to illness.
