= Gene Ormsby =

Former English rugby league footballer

Personal information
- Born: 12 September 1992 (age 33) Oldham, England
- Height: 6 ft 2 in (188 cm)
- Weight: 15 st 13 lb (101 kg)

Playing information
- Position: Wing
Club
Years	Team	Pld	T	G	FG	P
2013–14	Swinton Lions	19	2	0	0	8
2014–16	Warrington Wolves	42	29	0	0	116
2015(loan)	→ N Wales Crusaders	2	0	0	0	0
2016(loan)	→ Huddersfield Giants	7	6	0	0	24
2017–18	Huddersfield Giants	4	0	0	0	0
2017(loan)	→ Oldham	1	0	0	0	0
2018	Barrow Raiders	8	4	0	0	16
	Total	83	41	0	0	164
- Source: As of 19 March 2018

Gene Ormsby is a former English rugby league footballer who most recently played for the Barrow Raiders in the Championship. He plays on the wing.

Ormsby joined Warrington at the age of 16 from amateur side Oldham St Annes ARLFC. After spending time as a dual registered player at Swinton, he made his Super League début in February 2014 against Leeds. Ormsby enjoyed a successful opening season with the Wolves, scoring 12 tries in his opening season. He scored his first career hat trick against the Salford in June 2015 in a 34–18 win.. He has also had a loan spell at Oldham RLFC.

In 2016, he was called up to the initial Ireland squad for the 2017 Rugby League World Cup European Pool B qualifiers.; however, he did not make the cut for the final 22-man squad.
