= Anthony England =

English former rugby league footballer

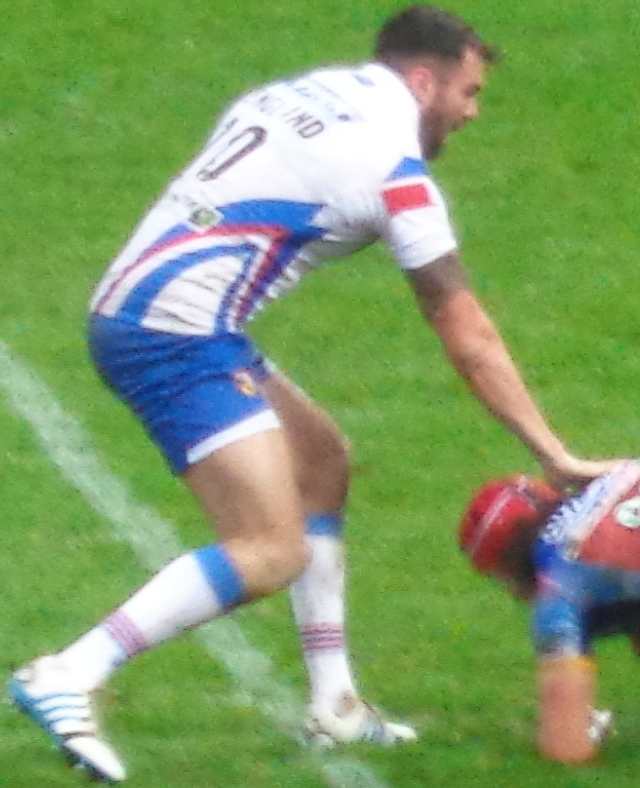

Personal information
- Born: 19 October 1986 (age 38); Dewsbury, West Yorkshire, England

Playing information
- Height: 6 ft 4 in (1.93 m)
- Weight: 17 st 7 lb (111 kg)
- Position: Prop
Club
Years	Team	Pld	T	G	FG	P
2005	Castleford Tigers	2	0	0	0	0
2008	Batley Bulldogs	5	0	0	0	0
2009	Gateshead Thunder	9	1	0	0	4
2010–11	Dewsbury Rams	45	6	0	0	24
2012–13	Featherstone Rovers	41	7	0	0	28
2014–15	Warrington Wolves	39	3	0	0	12
2014(loan)	→ Swinton Lions	1	0	0	0	0
2016–19	Wakefield Trinity	86	2	0	0	8
2020	Bradford Bulls	5	0	0	0	0
	Total	233	19	0	0	76
- Relatives: Keith England (uncle)

Anthony England (born 19 October 1986) is an English former professional rugby league footballer who last played as a prop for the Bradford Bulls in the Championship.

He has previously played for the Castleford Tigers in National League One, and Gateshead Thunder in National League Two and the Co-operative Championship. England also played for the Dewsbury Rams and Featherstone Rovers in the Championship, and the Warrington Wolves and Wakefield Trinity in the Super League.

== Background ==
England was born in Dewsbury, West Yorkshire, England.

== Retirement ==
On 1 April 2021 he announced his retirement due to injury.
