= Sam Wilde =

English rugby league footballer

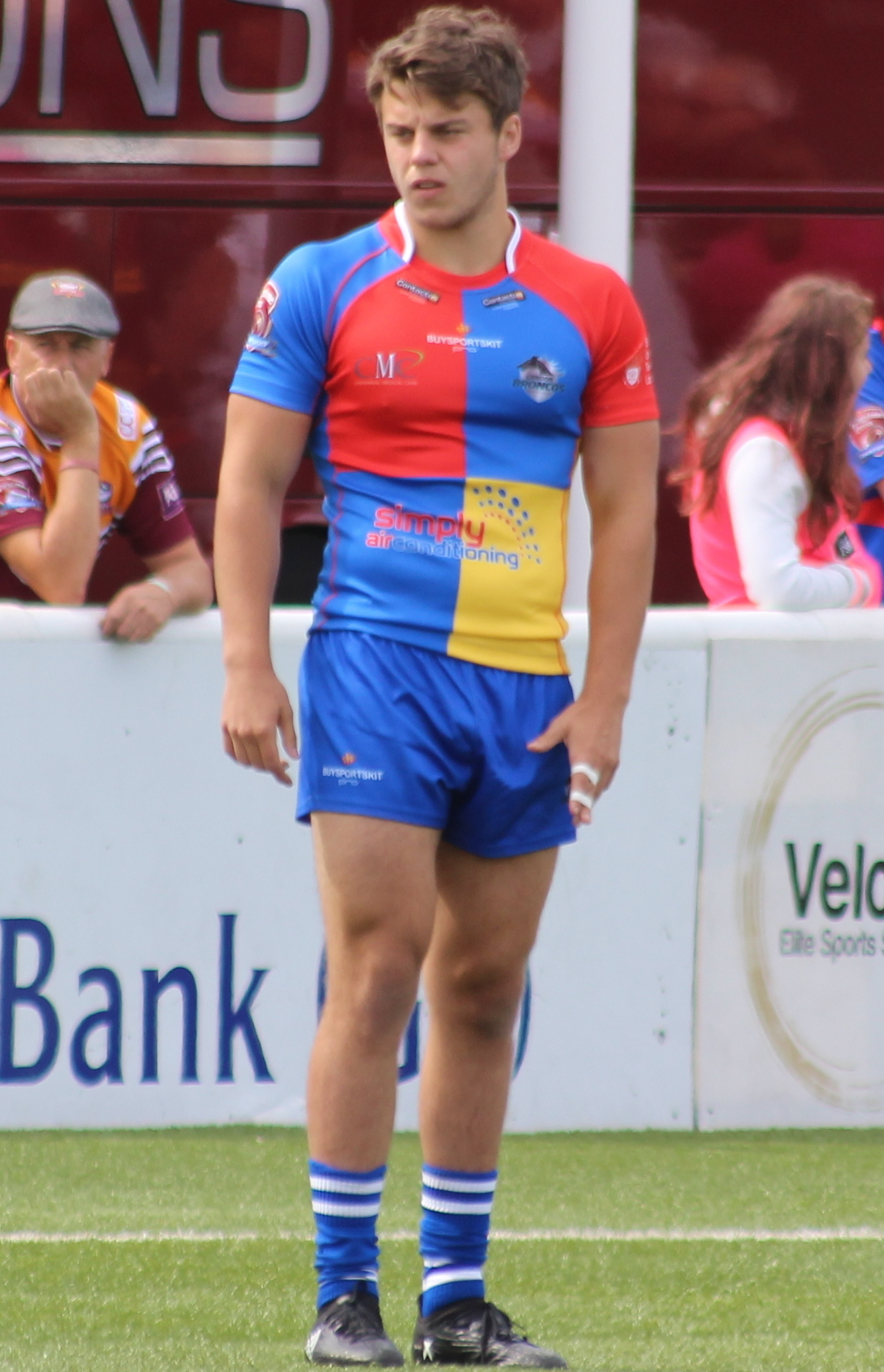

Personal information
- Born: 8 September 1995 (age 30)
- Height: 6 ft 2 in (1.88 m)
- Weight: 16 st 1 lb (102 kg)

Playing information
- Position: Second-row, Loose forward
Club
Years	Team	Pld	T	G	FG	P
2015–17	Warrington Wolves	22	1	0	0	4
2016(loan)	→ Rochdale Hornets	3	2	0	0	8
2017(loan)	→ Rochdale Hornets	3	0	0	0	0
2017(loan)	→ Widnes Vikings	2	0	0	0	0
2017(loan)	→ London Broncos	4	0	0	0	0
2018–20	Widnes Vikings	21	2	0	0	8
2021	Newcastle Thunder	11	1	0	0	4
2022–24	Widnes Vikings	27	10	0	0	40
2025	North Wales Crusaders	20	23	1	0	94
2026–	Widnes Vikings	0	0	0	0	0
	Total	113	39	1	0	158
- Source: As of 22 December 2025

Sam Wilde (born 8 September 1995) is an English professional rugby league footballer who plays as a second-row or loose forward for the Widnes Vikings in the RFL Championship.

He previously played for the North Wales Crusaders, Warrington Wolves, and had loan periods with the Widnes Vikings, Rochdale Hornets and the London Broncos.

== Career ==
=== Warrington Wolves ===
Wilde, a former Shevington Sharks junior, he made his début for the Warrington Wolves against the Wigan Warriors at Halliwell Jones Stadium, Warrington on 2 July 2015.

He played in the 2016 Super League Grand Final defeat by the Wigan Warriors at Old Trafford.

=== Widnes Vikings ===
The Widnes club announced on 31 October 2019 that Wilde had joined the club for the 2020 season.

=== Ottawa Aces ===
On 12 August 2020 it was announced that Wilde had signed for the new franchise.

=== Newcastle Thunder ===
On 29 November 2020 it was announced that Wilde had signed for the Newcastle Thunder ahead of the 2021 season, after the deferment of Ottawa Aces joining the competition.

=== Widnes Vikings (re-join) ===
On 10 August 2021 it was reported that he had signed for Widnes in the RFL Championship.

=== North Wales Crusaders ===
On 22 July 2024 it was reported that he had signed for the North Wales Crusaders in the RFL League 1.

=== Widnes Vikings (re-join) ===
On 14 November 2025 it was reported that he had re-joined Widnes Vikings in the RFL Championship
