= Chris Hill (rugby league) =

Great Britain and England international rugby league footballer

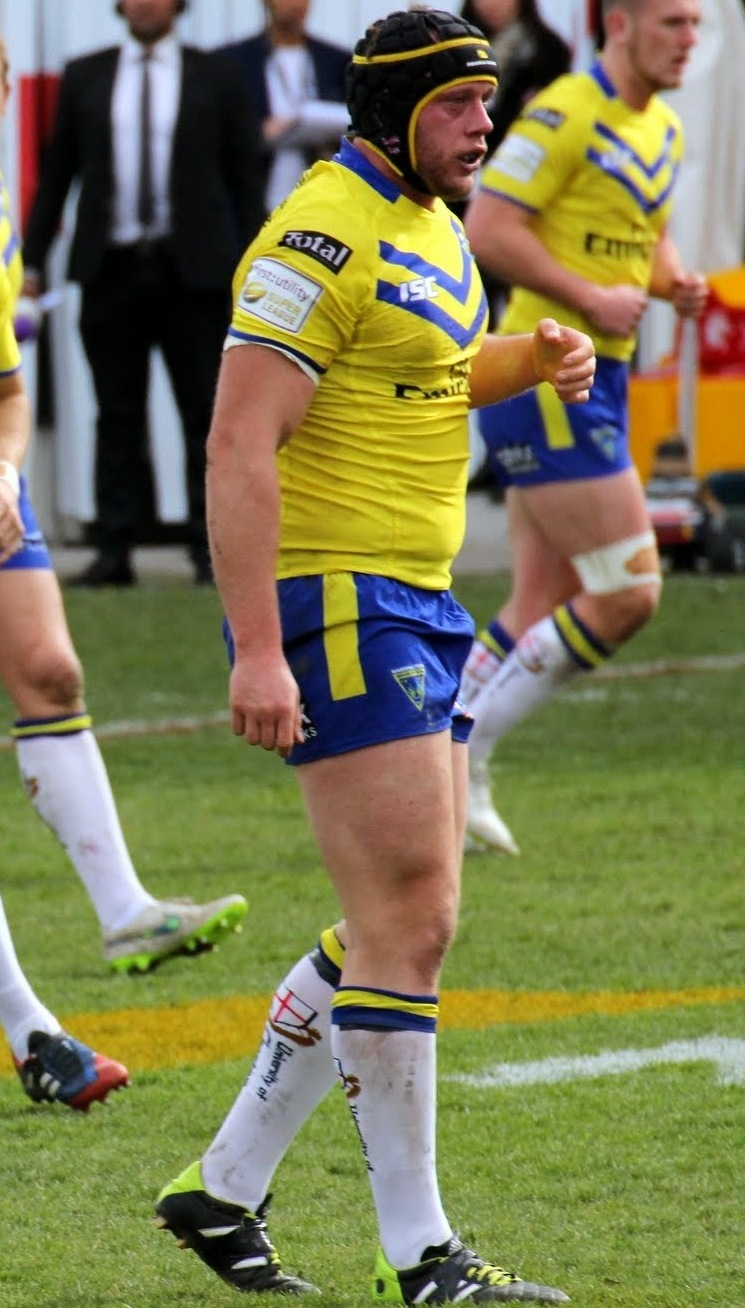

Personal information
- Full name: Christopher Andrew Hill
- Born: 3 November 1987 (age 39) Leigh, Greater Manchester, England
- Height: 6 ft 3 in (1.90 m)
- Weight: 17 st 13 lb (114 kg)

Playing information
- Position: Prop
Club
Years	Team	Pld	T	G	FG	P
2005–11	Leigh Centurions	160	35	0	0	140
2012–21	Warrington Wolves	297	35	0	0	140
2022–24	Huddersfield Giants	62	1	0	0	4
2025	Salford Red Devils	13	0	0	0	0
2025	Bradford Bulls	5	0	0	0	0
	Total	537	71	0	0	284
Representative
Years	Team	Pld	T	G	FG	P
2012–23	England	37	0	0	0	0
2019	Great Britain	4	0	0	0	0
- Source: As of 1 August 2025

Christopher Andrew Hill (born 3 November 1987) is an English former professional rugby league footballer.

He previously played for the Leigh Centurions in the Championship, Warrington Wolves, Huddersfield Giants and Salford Red Devils in the Super League, Bradford Bulls in the Championship, and represented England and Great Britain at international level.

== Early career ==
Hill signed for Leigh from local Wigan amateur club New Springs Lions in 2004, and started his career as a stand-off or loose forward before moving to prop, progressing through Leigh's service area, scholarship and youth ranks before moving into the first team at the Leigh Centurions.

== Playing career ==
=== Leigh Centurions ===
He made his first senior appearance for Leigh in the 2005 Super League X season, during a 8–74 defeat by St Helens.

In 2006, Hill won the Northern Rail Cup with Leigh after consolidating his place in the side. He toured Australia with Great Britain Under-18s in this same year.

2011 saw Hill win his second Northern Rail Cup trophy with Leigh, featuring as Halifax were defeated 16-20 at Blackpool's Bloomfield Road Stadium.

Hill accumulated a couple of accolades with Leigh; firstly in reaching 100 appearances for the club, and also being the most recent prop-forward for Leigh to score a hat-trick of tries. After missing only one game in two years, he was made captain of Leigh in 2010.

=== Warrington Wolves ===
In 2011, Hill's impressive displays in the Championship saw him earn a three-year deal with Warrington in Super League, which saw him join the Warrington squad in 2012, remaining with Leigh on a dual registration until the end of the 2011 season. In light of this, his then-coach Ian Millward predicted future national caps for Hill, with his nurturing at Warrington.

I am delighted for Chris. As the fans will testify he has developed all season and is ready for Super League. It would not surprise me if in due course he won national recognition.

Hill was selected to start in the 2012 Challenge Cup Final victory over Leeds at Wembley Stadium.

At the end of Hill's first season with Warrington, Hill was named as player of the season, players’ player of the season and won the Vice President's award, thus taking each of the major accolades at the Warrington end of season awards night.

Hill played in the 2012 Super League Grand Final defeat by Leeds at Old Trafford. Hill played in the 2013 Super League Grand Final defeat by Wigan at Old Trafford.

In 2016, Hill was named club captain of the Warrington outfit. This was a successful year overall for the Warrington club under Hill, as they reached both finals and won their first piece of silverware since 2016, when they won the League Leaders' Shield, the second time in the club's history. Hill was named in the Dream team for the season, and was also the Top Metre Maker of the season. He was rewarded for this amazing season with a contract extension with the club, which will keep him with the Warrington club until at least November 2021. Hill played in the 2016 Challenge Cup Final defeat by Hull F.C. at Wembley Stadium.

Hill played in the 2016 Super League Grand Final defeat by Wigan at Old Trafford.

Hill played in the 2018 Challenge Cup Final defeat by the Catalans Dragons at Wembley Stadium. Hill played in the 2018 Super League Grand Final defeat by Wigan at Old Trafford.

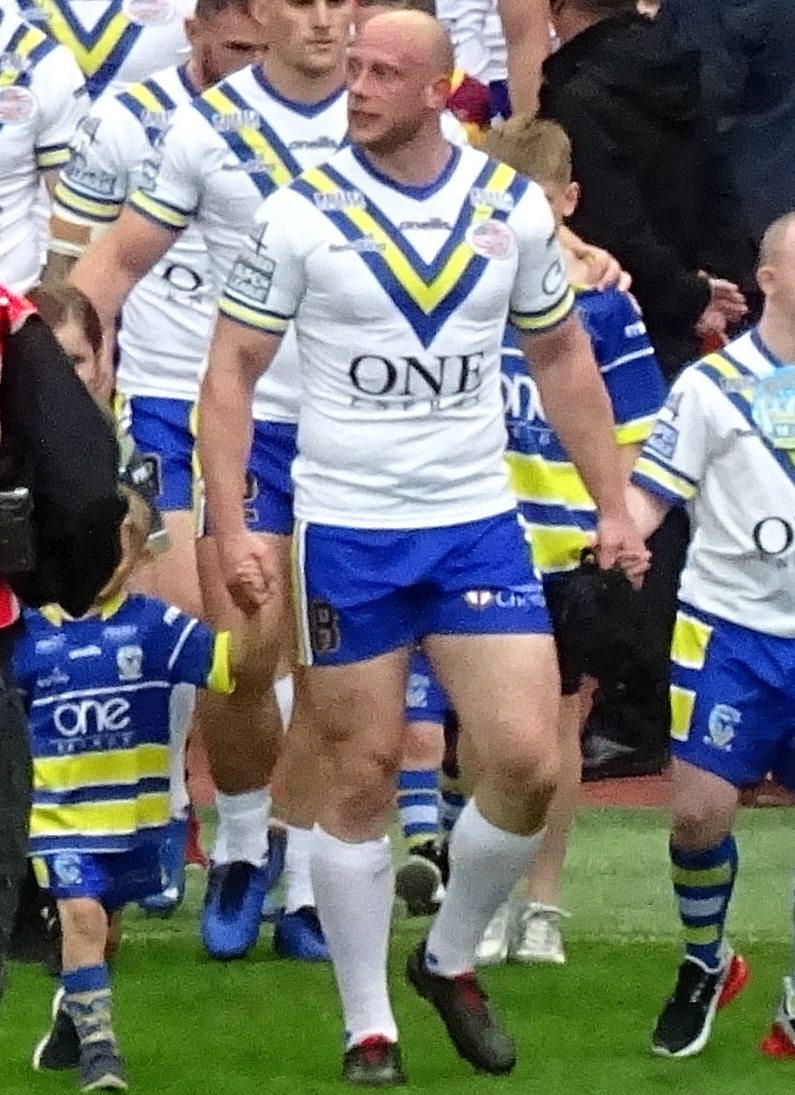
Hill leading the Warrington Wolves out at Anfield in 2019

Hill played in the 2019 Challenge Cup Final victory over St. Helens at Wembley Stadium.

=== Huddersfield Giants ===
On 10 September 2021, it was reported that he had signed for Huddersfield in the Super League On 14 April 2022, he made his 500th career appearance in a 20–20 draw against Leeds Rhinos. On 28 May 2022, Hill played for Huddersfield in their 2022 Challenge Cup Final loss to Wigan. In round 25 of the 2022 Super League season, Hill was controversially sin binned in Huddersfield's 18-14 loss to Leeds. Hill played 24 games for Huddersfield in the 2023 Super League season as the club finished ninth on the table and missed the playoffs. Hill featured in 19 games for Huddersfield in the 2024 Super League season as the club finished 9th on the table.

=== Salford Red Devils ===
On 2 October 2024, it was reported that Hill had signed for Salford in the Super League.

=== Bradford Bulls ===
On 1 August 2025 it was reported that Hill had signed for Bradford Bulls following from the financial difficulties that Salford were facing. Hill was granted immediate release from his Salford contract to join the Bulls for the remainder of the 2025 season in order to try help push their title hopes in the Betfred Championship.

== Personal life ==
In 2015, Hill set up a plumbing business, Premier Plumbing. On 12 September 2019 Hill opened a bathroom showroom called Immerse Bathroom Showroom.

== International career ==
Hill made his International début for England in the 2012 Autumn International Series match against Wales in Wrexham.

In October and November 2013, Hill played in all five England matches of the Rugby League World Cup. At the end of the 2014 domestic season, Hill travelled to Australia as part of the England national rugby league team's Four Nations squad.

In the 2015 International period, Hill was selected in Steve McNamara's 24-man squad to take on New Zealand up in England in a test-series. Before the series began England played a test match against France. Hill was part of the team that defeated the 'Les Tricolores'. The following year, Hill was selected in England's 24-man squad for the 2016 Four Nations.

In October 2017, he was selected in the England squad for the 2017 Rugby League World Cup.

Hill was selected in squad for the 2019 Great Britain Lions tour of the Southern Hemisphere. He made his Great Britain test début in the defeat by Tonga.

Hill was named in the 2021 world cup squad for England. Hill played in every match at the tournament including England's 27-26 semi-final loss to Samoa. In October and November 2023, Hill played in all three matches of Tonga's tour of England as the Three Lions won the series 3-0.
