= Chris Sandow =

Australian rugby league footballer (born 1989)

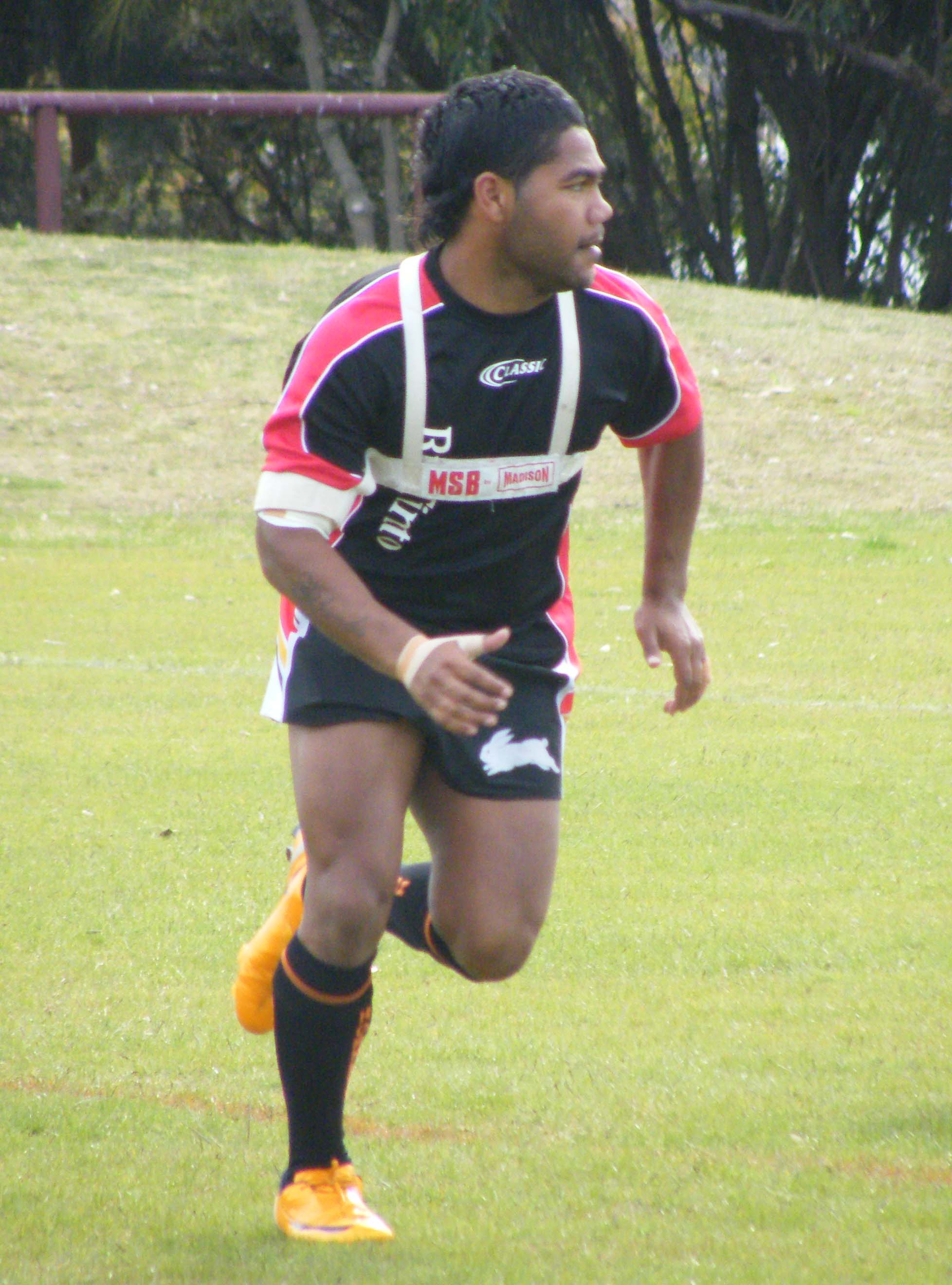

Personal information
- Full name: Chris Sandow
- Born: 9 January 1989 (age 37) Kingaroy, Queensland, Australia
- Height: 173 cm (5 ft 8 in)
- Weight: 89 kg (14 st 0 lb)

Playing information
- Position: Halfback
Club
Years	Team	Pld	T	G	FG	P
2008–11	South Sydney	84	19	198	13	485
2012–15	Parramatta Eels	75	15	135	5	335
2015–16	Warrington Wolves	31	12	26	1	101
	Total	190	46	359	19	921
Representative
Years	Team	Pld	T	G	FG	P
2010	Prime Minister's XIII	1	1	0	0	4
2008–12	Indigenous All Stars	2	0	2	0	4
- Source: As of 9 January 2019

Chris Sandow (born 9 January 1989) is an Australian former professional rugby league footballer who played as a goal-kicking halfback or five-eighth. He could also play as a fullback.

== Background ==
Sandow was born in Kingaroy, Queensland.

Sandow grew up in Queensland, playing rugby league in the Aboriginal community of Cherbourg, a three-hour drive north-west of Brisbane.

He later moved to Brisbane, where he attended Marsden State High School with Israel Folau and Antonio Winterstein.

Sandow is from the Bigambul/Gubbi Gubbi traditional Aboriginal territory.

== Playing career ==
=== Previous clubs ===
He has previously played for the Moranbah Miners of the local Grade A Mackay rugby league competition, Norths Devils in the Queensland Cup, Warrington Wolves in the Super League, he has also played for the Parramatta Eels and the South Sydney Rabbitohs in the National Rugby League.

=== Early career ===
He played Colts and Queensland Cup rugby league for the Souths Logan Magpies. Sandow received junior representative honors when he was selected for the Queensland under-17's and under-19's squads.

In 2006, while in year 12 at Marsden State High School, his classmates were Israel Folau and Antonio Winterstein.

Sandow was selected for the Australian Schoolboys squad that toured Wales, England and France. In which he was awarded the 'Man-of-the-Match' Award, in the game against the British Amateur Rugby League Association (BARLA) squad.

Sandow's first contract was signed with the Gold Coast Titans, where he spent two-years in the lower-grades.

He was touted as a first-string back-up for star NRL halfback, Scott Prince. But his contract was terminated in early 2008, due to poor discipline. It was later revealed through the media, that Sandow's partner had given birth to their first child and he was struggling with the distance away from his family.

=== South Sydney (2008–11) ===
Sandow's junior representative performances had not gone unnoticed, therefore, South Sydney's Recruitment Manager Mark Hughes, signed Sandow to a minor $30,000 contract with the club.

Sandow began playing in the National Youth Competition for the Rabbitohs squad, from the beginning of the 2008 season.

In June 2008, the team's star halfback Craig Wing, suffered a near season-ending injury. Sandow was named to replace him in South Sydney's NRL first-grade team.

At the time Sandow was to make his début the club were sitting at the bottom of the NRL competition ladder. Having slumped to 11 losses from 12 matches.

In round 13 during the 2008 season, Sandow made his first-grade début against the Warriors in Auckland, New Zealand at Mt. Smart Stadium.

On début Sandow kicked the game-sealing field-goal in the dying seconds of the match. To record Souths' second victory of the season, defeating the Warriors 35–28. This marked the first time since 1999, that South Sydney had beaten the Warriors.

In the following match Sandow scored his first NRL career try against the Gold Coast Titans. Helping his side to a tight 24–23 victory, that saw them come off the bottom of the table for the first time all season.

Sandow's fairy-tale start to his NRL career continued a week later in round 16, when after trailing 28–4 to the North Queensland Cowboys and coming back to level the scores at 28–28, he kicked the game-clinching field-goal to win the match 29–28, in what became the second biggest comeback victory in the history of the National Rugby League.

Sandow finished his début season in the NRL by winning the Dally M Award – 'Rookie of the Year Award.' He was presented with the award at the end of the 2008 campaign.

He was recognised in the Toyota Cup – 'Team of the Year,' as the starting halfback. He also received the Inaugural George Green Medal – 'Indigenous Rising Star' of 2008.

=== Parramatta Eels (2012–15) ===
In 2012, Sandow signed a four-year deal with the Parramatta Eels, "Reportedly" worth between $1.6 and $2.2 million.

Sandow stated that the reason he was leaving South Sydney to ensure his children were, "well provided for in the future".

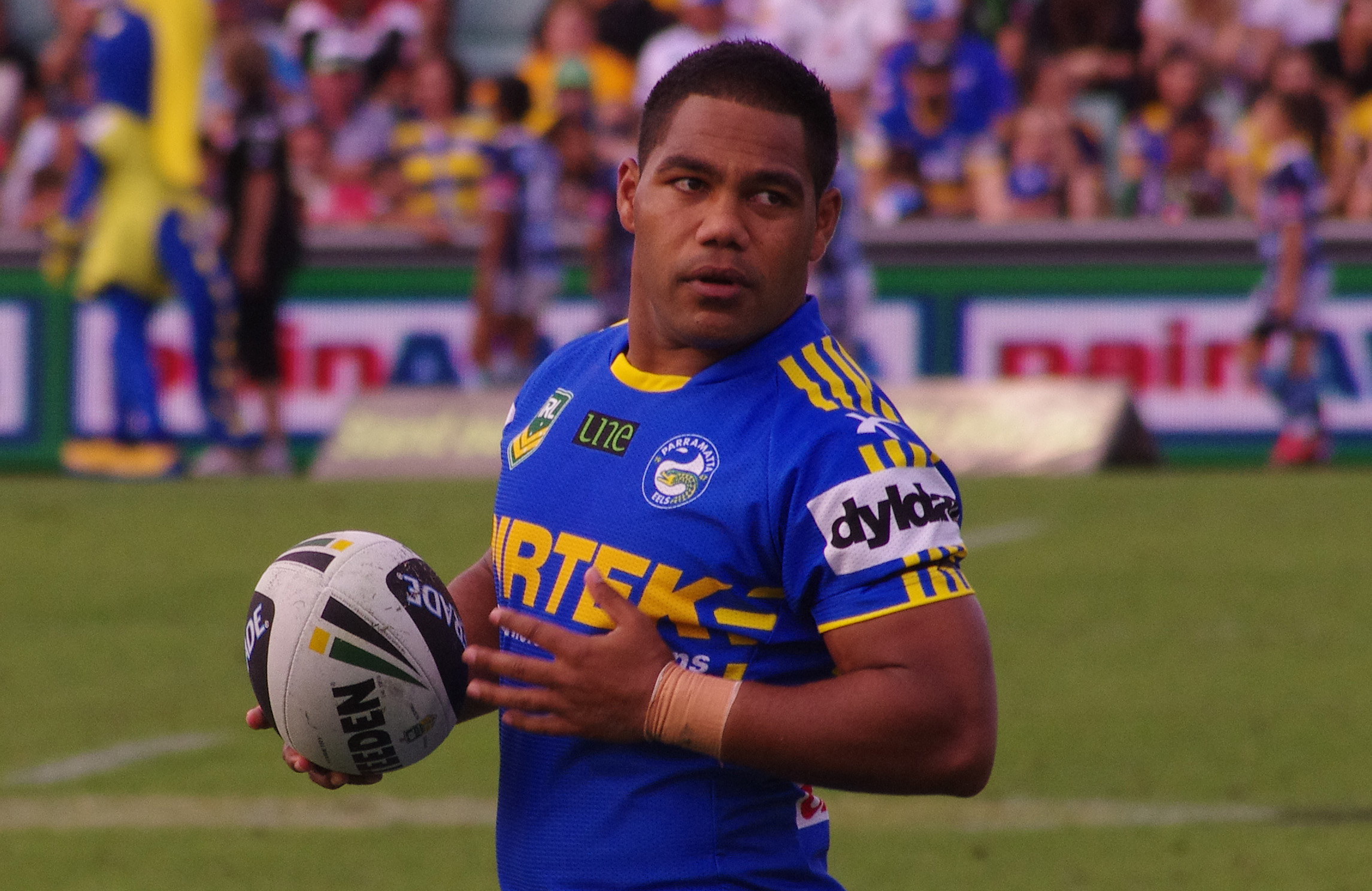
Sandow with the Parramatta Eels in 2013

Sandow's first two-years with the Parramatta Eels proved to be a struggle as his performances were inconsistent and he spent time in the New South Wales Cup, with the Wentworthville Magpies.

In the 2012 season, Sandow was accused by Parramatta Legend Peter Sterling as being "overweight and unfit".

In the 2014 season, Sandow won the Ken Thornett Medal, for being voted as the Parramatta Eels' 'Player of the Season.' The 2015 season would prove to be Sandow's final year at the club.

After a number of on-the field and off-the field incidents. Including but not limiting crashing a loan-car and abandoning it in an industrial area. Calling out coach Brad Arthur and being critical of his coaching methods publicly, typing a foul-mouthed rant on Social Media platform Facebook and gambling issues.

Sandow's final match for the Parramatta Eels was in round 19, against arch-rivals the Canterbury-Bankstown Bulldogs. Afterwards Sandow was released by the Parramatta Eels club and "reportedly" received a $50,000 handshake.

=== Warrington Wolves (2015–16) ===
Sandow joined the Warrington Wolves at the start of the 2015 Super League Super 8s system. Going on to make his début against the Leeds Rhinos in a 49–10 defeat.

Sandow struggled in his opening games, however he grew more and more into the games as they wore on.

In round 1 of the 2016 Super League season, Sandow scored his first try for Warrington in a 12–10 win away at the Leeds Rhinos.

He followed up in round 3, scoring his first try at the Halliwell Jones Stadium in a 36–14 win against the Wakefield Trinity Wildcats.

Sandow was already the early front-runner to win the 2016 Steve Prescott Man of Steel Award, with Head Coach Tony Smith saying, "Sandow has the best kicking game in the Super League since Sean Long".

Sandow represented the Warrington Wolves in both the 2016 Challenge Cup Final defeat by Hull F.C. at Wembley Stadium and the 2016 Super League Grand Final defeat by the Wigan Warriors at Old Trafford where he finished a runner-up in both major finals.

In November 2016, Sandow announced that he wasn't going to be returning to Warrington for the 2017 season.

In light of Sandow's statement, Warrington, were said to be, "retaining Sandow's registration until further notice".

=== Norths Devils (2017) ===
In 2017, Sandow signed with Queensland Cup team Norths Devils on a one-year deal. Sandow played 12 games for the club, scoring three tries and kicking six goals before being stood-down from his duties due to missing a training session, subsequently leading to his departure from the club.

=== Moranbah Miners (2018) ===
On 20 December 2017, Sandow signed a contract to join the Moranbah Miners in the local grade A Mackay rugby league competition for the 2018 season.

=== Representative career (2008–12) ===
Sandow earned selection in the Indigenous All Stars team, that defeated the New Zealand Māori 34–26, in a curtain-raising game at the Rugby League World Cup Opening Ceremony in October 2008.

Sandow played for the Prime Minister's XIII in 2010. Making only one appearance and scoring a single try.

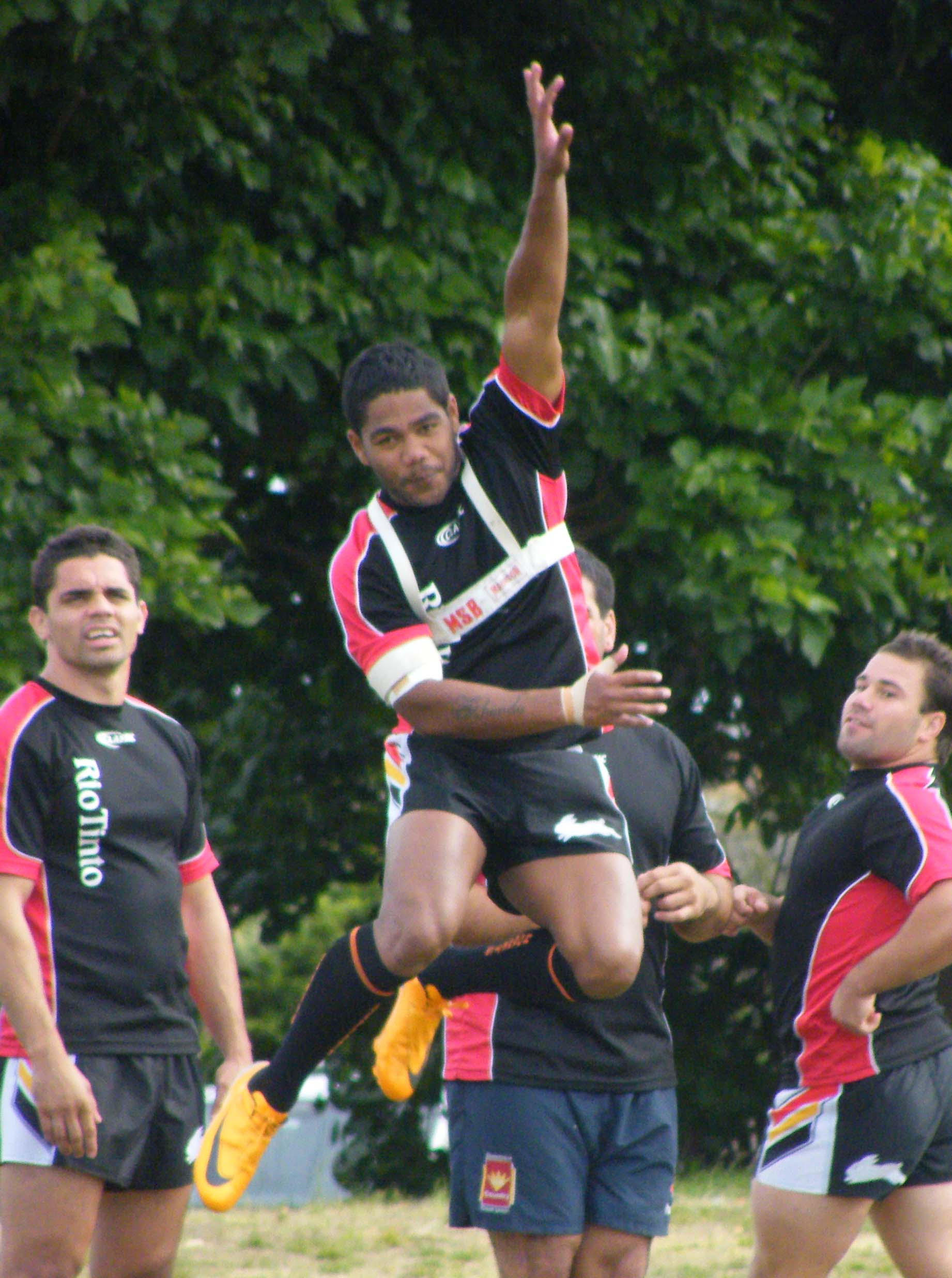
Sandow training with the Indigenous Dreamtime Team.

== Boxing ==
Sandow made his professional boxing debut on 27 November 2013 in a fight against Todd Carney.

== Controversy ==
On 2 January 2017, Sandow was charged with a public nuisance offence after being filmed in a street brawl in Queensland's South Burnett Region.

On 10 January 2017, Sandow was fined $300 at Murgon Magistrates Court in Queensland over the brawl and he escaped conviction.

In September 2022, Sandow appeared in court over charges of serious assault of a police officer causing bodily harm, serious assault of a police officer or person acting in aid of police officer and two counts of obstructing police. He also faced charges of dangerous operation of a motor vehicle, two counts of driving without a licence and evasion.

On 14 December 2024, it was reported that he had been sentenced for obstructing police after earlier being disqualified from driving. Sandow was sentenced to 200 hours of unpaid community services within a year and disqualified him from holding or obtaining a driver's licence for two years.

On 29 August 2025, Sandow was sentenced at Ipswich Magistrates Court in relation to charges involving carrying a weapon in public, drug possession, possessing explosives, assaulting and obstructing police officers, and wilful damage. Sandow was involved in throwing rocks at cars in March 2025. Sandow will be eligible for release to parole on 3 March 2026.

== Honours ==
=== Individual Honours (Career Awards and Accolades) ===
- 2008: Peter Moore Award – Dally M 'Rookie of the Year'
- 2008: George Green Medal – 'Indigenous Rising Star of 2008'
- 2008: Toyota Cup – 'Halfback of the Year'
- 2014: Ken Thornett Medal – Parramatta Eels' 'Player of the Season'
