= 2013 International Origin =

Rugby league match

England	Exiles
30	10
- Date: 14 June 2013
- Venue: Halliwell Jones Stadium, Warrington
- Man of the Match: Sam Tomkins (England)
- Referee: Richard Silverwood (England)
- Attendance: 7,926

The 2013 International Origin was the third and final edition of International Origin between England and Exiles. For 2013, the competition had reverted to a single-match format and aimed to give England a good mid-season test in preparation for the 2013 Rugby League World Cup in November. The match was played on 14 June 2013 at the Halliwell Jones Stadium.

== Match details ==
14 June 2013

England	30 – 10	Exiles
Tries: Hardaker, Roby, Cudjoe (2), Tomkins; Goals: Sinfield 4/4, Charnley 1/1	(Report)	Tries: Paea, Monaghan; Goals: Richards 1/2

Halliwell Jones Stadium, Warrington, England
Attendance: 7,926
Referee: Richard Silverwood
Player of the Match: Sam Tomkins (England)

1st Half

The first 15 minutes were very even as both teams probed each other's try line and each team made a couple of breaks but good cover defence soon rubbed out any threat of a try. However, in the 19th minute a break from James Roby (from a Chris Hill offload) set England up in a good position. First they tried a sweeping move to the right only for Gareth Ellis to be shut down, then a sweeping move to the left saw Sam Tomkins place a delicate grubber kick through the defence for Zak Hardaker to pounce on to score the game's first try. Captain Kevin Sinfield converted to make it 6–0. Another try for England soon followed as the Exiles tried to attack the England line only for Leroy Cudjoe to shoot up and shut Brett Hodgson down who lost the ball. Sinfield picked the loose ball up and offloaded to James Roby who then sprinted 80m to score under the posts. Sinfield converted to make it 12–0. The first half was dominated by England and they showed their dominance as Rangi Chase made a break down the left before being tackled. Then a few passes to the right saw Richie Myler put Gareth Ellis through a gap, he then offloaded to Cudjoe who produced an outrageous dummy to Exiles fullback Hodgson which left Cudjoe to stroll over for a try. Sinfield converted to make it 18–0. Sinfield made a break from dummy half in the 34th minute and found Sam Tomkins in support who sprinted 50m to score under the sticks. Sinfield converted to give his team a 24–0 advantage at half time.

2nd Half

England came out after half time and continued to dominate through excellent kicking and field possession. This dominance nearly paid off as Sam Tomkins jinked his way over the line only for the video referee to disallow it due to an obstruction. This resulted in a penalty and the Exiles got themselves into a good position through great runs from Steve Menzies and Michael Dobson before hooker Lance Hohaia ran across the England line and gave a drop off to Mickey Paea who powered over the line to score. Winger Pat Richards converted to make it 24–6. A few minutes later Hohaia made a break up the middle and the Exiles took advantage of the lack of defence as Travis Burns found Menzies on the right hand side who simply drew in the defender and gave Joel Monaghan a walk in try. Richards missed the conversion to make it 24–10. The game was wrapped up in the 77th minute as the Exiles tried some off the cuff rugby on the last tackle and Harrison Hansen's pass was intercepted by Leroy Cudjoe who sprinted 50m to score. Josh Charnley converted to ensure that England won 30–10.

== Teams ==
=== England ===
England RL announced their team on the day of the match. Wigan Warriors key man Sam Tomkins was selected at fullback with his teammate Josh Charnley on one wing. The centre partnership was between Huddersfield Giants player Leroy Cudjoe and Leeds Rhinos fullback Zak Hardaker who beat out the likes of Ryan Atkins and Kallum Watkins for the position. Richie Myler was selected at Scrum Half to partner captain Kevin Sinfield in the halves instead of regular England choice Rangi Chase who was demoted to the bench. Youngster Liam Farrell also received a call up to the starting line-up after an impressive season and veteran Gareth Ellis started his first Origin game after returning from Australia. McNamara also handed a debut to Brett Ferres who started on the bench.

Position	Game 1
Fullback	Sam Tomkins
Wing	Josh Charnley
Centre	Leroy Cudjoe
Centre	Zak Hardaker
Wing	Ryan Hall
Stand Off	Kevin Sinfield
Scrum Half	Richie Myler
Prop	Chris Hill
Hooker	James Roby
Prop	Lee Mossop
2nd Row	Liam Farrell
2nd Row	Gareth Ellis
Lock	Jamie Jones-Buchanan
Interchange	Rangi Chase
Interchange	Eorl Crabtree
Interchange	Ben Westwood
Interchange	Brett Ferres
Coach	Steve McNamara
18th Man	Rob Burrow

=== Exiles ===
The Exiles 2013 squad included a lot of players who had previously played in the International Origin. Australian Brian McLennan (who previously coached Leeds Rhinos) was once again selected as the Exiles coach after leading them to victory in the inaugural 2011 International Origin. Brett Hodgson was also named the captain for the 2nd series in a row. The initial squad featured several players who had played International Origin before however the coach has added some new players into the camp such as Blake Green, Manase Manuokafoa and Jarrod Sammut to name a few. Ever presents Francis Meli, Iosia Soliola and Willie Manu are also included.

On 13 June Brian McLennan announce his match day 17 for the game. He handed debuts to Hull Kingston Rovers trio Travis Burns, Michael Dobson and Mickey Paea. He also handed a debut to Catalans Dragons second-row Zeb Taia and London Broncos forward Chris Bailey. The coach also promoted Bradford Bulls hooker Heath L'Estrange to the starting line-up after Michael Monaghan was ruled out through injury.

Position	Game 1
Fullback	Brett Hodgson
Wing	Pat Richards
Centre	Joel Moon
Centre	Steve Menzies
Wing	Joel Monaghan
Stand Off	Travis Burns
Scrum Half	Michael Dobson
Prop	Tony Puletua
Hooker	Heath L'Estrange
Prop	Kylie Leuluai
2nd-row	Trent Waterhouse
2nd-row	Iosia Soliola
Lock	Harrison Hansen
Interchange	Lance Hohaia
Interchange	Chris Bailey
Interchange	Mickey Paea
Interchange	Zeb Taia
Coach	Brian McLennan
18th man	Willie Manu
