= 2012 International Origin =

Rugby league match

| England | Exiles |
| 38 | 42 |
- On aggregate (Exiles win series)

First test
| England | Exiles |
| 18 | 10 |
- Date: 16 June 2012
- Venue: Langtree Park, St Helens
- Man of the Match: James Roby (England)
- Referee: Ben Thaler (England)
- Attendance: 11,083

Second test
| Exiles | England |
| 32 | 20 |
- Date: 4 July 2012
- Venue: Kirklees Stadium, Huddersfield
- Man of the Match: Daniel Holdsworth (Exiles)
- Referee: Ben Thaler (England)
- Attendance: 7,865

The 2012 International Origin was the second edition of the International Origin competition between England and Exiles. Unlike 2011, the 2012 edition was a two-game series.

There were a couple of changes in personnel for the Exiles team in 2012, such as former St. Helens coach Daniel Anderson was selected to be the head coach of the Exiles; also, former Exiles captain Danny Buderus went back to Australia following the 2011 season so former New South Wales fullback Brett Hodgson replaced him as captain.

== Match Details: Game 1 ==
16 June 2012

| England | 18 – 10 | Exiles |
|---|---|---|
| Tries: Hock, Tickle, S.Tomkins; Goals: Sinfield 3/3 | (Report) | Tries: Meli, Millard; Goals: Dureau 1/2 |

Langtree Park, St. Helens, England
Attendance: 11,083
Referee: Ben Thaler
Player of the Match: James Roby (England)

England's side consisted of 15 players who had played internationally for England or Great Britain in the past but handed a debut to Wigan Warriors prop Lee Mossop and also Wigan winger Josh Charnley, who was selected after scoring 22 Super League tries in the 2012 season. Also, Wigan forward Gareth Hock was called up for international selection for the first time since being banned for two years for failing a drugs test.

The Exiles coach, Daniel Anderson, had originally picked Warrington Wolves fullback Brett Hodgson in his starting line-up but due to an injury he had to call up Hull Kingston Rovers fullback Shannon McDonnell as a replacement the day before the match; also Setaimata Sa was supposed to start in the centre but again due to injury he had to be replaced by Daryl Millard. Wigan Warriors halfback Brett Finch was also supposed to feature but once again injury forced him out of the squad, meaning Wigan teammate Thomas Leuluai had to fill in at stand off whilst Lance Hohaia had to replace injured Michael Monaghan at hooker in the week leading up to the game.

First half

Heavy rain caused the match to be a mainly forward-dominated game; however, both sides did try to throw the ball about a bit. The weather caused both teams to knock on a few times in the opening minutes and players from both sides put in some huge tackles with a notable one coming from the Exiles Francis Meli on England's Sam Tomkins. The mistakes continued until the Exiles loose forward David Fa'alogo dropped the ball 35 metres from his own line, giving England possession in the Exiles half. After a solid set in possession, Rangi Chase put a grabber kick through which ricocheted off Scott Dureau's hand and Gareth Hock picked the ball up, dummied Shannon McDonnell and crossed to score the game's first try. Kevin Sinfield added the conversion to put England into an early 6–0 lead.

James Roby went close to scoring after 26 minutes as he put a grubber through from 5 metres out and chased it before McDonnell knocked it dead for a drop out. In the resulting set of six, England got themselves to the last tackle, Rangi Chase then put a crossfield kick in from dummy half and centre Carl Ablett knocked it back to Sinfield whose offload gave Danny Tickle a try after barging through Tony Puletua and McDonnell. Sinfield converted to take England into a 12-0 lead.

On the next set try scorer Danny Tickle knocked on on his 40-metre line and gifted the Exiles vital possession. After a couple of tackles the Exiles threw the ball wide from right to left going through Thomas Leuluai's hands to Scott Dureau whose cut out pass found winger Francis Meli who only needed to slide in the corner for a try. Dureau could not convert the kick from the touchline.

Second half

England started off well in the second half and the first chance they got at attacking the Exiles line, stand off Rangi Chase nearly dropped it in a spread play however he hung on even after a massive shot from Antonio Kaufusi. In the next play the England side kept the ball alive and kept offloading until they ended up at the other side of the pitch where Kevin Sinfield put in a crossfield kick to the left wing. Exiles winger Joel Monaghan could not take the kick and it bounced off his hands into the arms of England star Sam Tomkins who rounded stand off Thomas Leuluai to score in the corner, Sinfield kicked the goal from the touchline to take England into a lead the scores being 18-4.

Another mistake from the Exiles, this time from fullback Shannon McDonnell, allowed England vital field position once again. Rob Burrow had a couple of good runs in the resulting set to place England in an attacking position. Sam Tomkins sliced through a gap however some excellent scrambling defence from the Exiles meant that Tomkins had to put a grubber through to Ryan Hall who was only denied a try by some outstanding defence from Thomas Leuluai as Hall crossed the line and knocked on. However, the tackle came at a cost as Exiles captain Leuluai was stretchered off the field with a season-ending ankle injury.

In the 60th minute, the Exiles enjoyed four repeat sets on England's line but looked like they could not get through to score. However a Lance Hohaia grubber caused problems for Sam Tomkins and he dropped it gifting the Exiles yet another set of six on England's line in the 66th minute, from the resulting set scrum half Scott Dureau grubbered the ball through on the 4th tackle and centre Daryl Millard was first to reach the ball and scored the final try of the game for the Exiles, Dureau added the conversion bringing the score to 18-10 in England's favour. England hooker James Roby was named Man of the Match.

== Match Details: Game 2 ==
4 July 2012

| England | 20 – 32 | Exiles |
|---|---|---|
| Tries: Atkins, Charnley, Briscoe, Cudjoe; Goals: Brough 2/4 | (Report) | Tries: Hodsgon (2), Dureau, Monaghan, Meli (2); Goals: Hodgson 4/6 |

Kirklees Stadium, Huddersfield, England
Attendance: 7,865
Referee: Ben Thaler
Player of the Match: Daniel Holdsworth (Exiles)

Due to a few couple in the England side, players had to pull out including Gareth Hock and Danny Tickle. Jon Wilkin was called into the team as was centre Leroy Cudjoe, enabling Carl Ablett to move into the second row to cover for the injuries. Another main absence was halfback Rangi Chase, who was suspended with full pay by Castleford Tigers but the circumstances are not known so coach Steve McNamara dropped him from the squad and brought in Danny Brough at scrum half. McNamara also rested Sam Tomkins, Ryan Hall, Kevin Sinfield and Sean O'Loughlin as they had club games not long after, so he drafted Stefan Ratchford, Tom Briscoe, Matty Smith and Scott Taylor into the squad to cover and to try out new combinations. Also prop and captain Jamie Peacock announced his retirement from the international game a week before the game so Liam Farrell was brought into the team. Jon Wilkin was named captain for Game 2.

The Exiles also made some changes to their team; captain Brett Hodgson recovered from his injury and will captain the side in Game 2. Joel Moon was brought in at centre to allow Sia Soliola to move into the pack where coach Daniel Anderson thinks he will be more effective. Salford City Reds halfback Daniel Holdsworth was given the number 6 jersey to replace injured Thomas Leuluai whilst Bradford Bulls hooker Heath L'Estrange will replace Lance Hohaia at number 9. Tony Puletua and Jeff Lima missed out on the team and Constantine Mika and Kylie Leuluai had to replace them whilst Steve Menzies came in at second row.

1st Half

The game started well for the Exiles as a long ball from Daniel Holdsworth which cut 3 men out allowed Joel Monaghan to break down the right side of the field, Holdsworth backed him up and passed inside to Steve Menzies. However Menzies was about to be tackled before Scott Dureau showed up to take the ball and perform a 360 degree swivel before offloading to Brett Hodgson who darted between 3 England players to score the first try of the game. Hodgson converted his own try to put the Exiles into an early 6-0 lead. England hit back in the 22nd minute, Scott Dureau put in a grubber kick which was fielded easily by Stefan Ratchford. Ratchford was tackled on his own 10m line, Warrington Wolves star Ryan Atkins then scooted from dummy half and evaded the markers to race 90m to score England's first try of the game. Danny Brough managed to kick the goal from a tight angle to level the scores at 6-6. However the Exiles soon regained the lead when stand off Daniel Holdsworth gave an inside ball to Steve Menzies which caught the England defence out. Menzies raced 30m before drawing the fullback in and passing to the supporting Lincoln Withers who had to pass to Scott Dureau to avoid the cover defence. Dureau crossed under the sticks and captain Brett Hodgson converted to give the Exiles a 12-6 lead. England once again hit back with a move which went to the left of the field and back to the right again. Rob Burrow ran across the face of the defence and found Ratchford, he then gave an inside ball to Jon Wilkin, as Wilkin was about to be tackled he quickly offloaded to Danny Brough, Brough ran to the right, isolated the Exiles winger and found Leroy Cudjoe with a cutout pass, he drew the winger in and passed outside to Josh Charnley who raced 25m and stepped inside Brett Hodgson to score a try. This time Danny Brough could not convert the try and the Exiles held onto a 2-point lead. The Exiles extended their lead even further just before the half time hooter. A scrum gave the Exiles vital field position which allowed them to execute a sweeping move to the left of the field with Brett Hodgson delivering the final cut out ball for Joel Monaghan to score in the corner. Hodgson could not convert the difficult kick but the Exiles went into halftime 16-10 up.

2nd Half

The Exiles started the second half in the same manner as they ended the first. They got themselves into good field position on the back of a Willie Manu drive. Then they once again executed a sweeping move this time from right to left and Brett Hodgson delivered the final cut-out ball for Francis Meli to score despite Josh Charnley's best efforts. Hodgson could not convert from the touchline but his team were 20-10 up. Soon after the Exiles added to their total. Daniel Holdsworth went close to scoring after reversing the direction of play, captain Brett Hodgson was at dummy half and dived through a gap the markers had left to score his 2nd try of the game, Hodgson also converted to extend the lead to 26-10. England soon hit back with a try of their own though, a good strong run from Carl Ablett got England into the Exile's 10 meter line. After a few drives they tried to execute a sweeping move but Matty Smith was easily cut down. On the next tackle Danny Brough received the ball to the left and threw a cut-out pass for winger Tom Briscoe to score by the narrowest of margins with Joel Monaghan nearly taking him into touch. Brough could not convert and the Exile's still led by 26-14. However their fightback was short lived as 3 minutes later Lincoln Withers ran from dummy half to attract 3 England players to him, Withers then passed the Daniel Holdsworth who skipped through Danny Brough's tackle to race 30m before passing to Francis Meli who had a clear run to the line for his 2nd of the night (this would also take him to 4 International Origin tries making him the leading scorer), he also improved the angle of the kick by scoring underneath the posts. Hodgson converted to take the game to 32-14 and beyond England's reach. England grabbed a consolation try with 4 minutes to go when they ran the ball on the last tackle. Lee Mossop took the ball in and as he was about to be tackled flicked the ball to Stefan Ratchford, he was soon wrapped up but not before he flicked it to Carl Ablett. Ablett brushed aside 2 Exile players before giving a basketball style pass to Leroy Cudjoe who had a clear route to the corner. Brough added the extras to make the final score 32-20 to the Exiles. As the series was drawn, the Exiles were awarded the trophy and declared 2012 International Origin series winners as they won last years series.

== Teams ==
=== England ===
The England side had many players who have represented either England or Great Britain before, however for Game 1 coach Steve McNamara handed Wigan Warriors duo Josh Charnley and Lee Mossop their senior England debuts after being in great form in the domestic competition. England were without their Australia based players Gareth Widdop, Jack Reed, Chris Heighington, Sam Burgess, Gareth Ellis and James Graham.

Captain Jamie Peacock announced his retirement from the international game a week before Game 2 for this reason he was not in the squad for this game. Also changes were made to the squad by coach Steve McNamara, this included resting Sam Tomkins, Sean O'Loughlin, Ryan Hall and Kevin Sinfield whilst Rangi Chase was left out due to disciplinary concerns at Castleford Tigers. Instead Danny Brough, Jonny Lomax, Stefan Ratchford, Matty Smith and Jodie Broughton came into the squad to replace them. Gareth Hock and Danny Tickle had to pull out due to slight knocks they received the week before the game.

| Position | Game 1 | Game 2 |
|---|---|---|
| Fullback | Sam Tomkins | Stefan Ratchford |
| Wing | Josh Charnley | |
| Centre | Carl Ablett | Leroy Cudjoe |
| Centre | Ryan Atkins | |
| Wing | Ryan Hall | Tom Briscoe |
| Stand Off | Kevin Sinfield | Matty Smith |
| Scrum Half | Rangi Chase | Danny Brough |
| Prop | Eorl Crabtree | |
| Hooker | James Roby | |
| Prop | Jamie Peacock (c) | Gareth Carvell |
| 2nd Row | Gareth Hock | Carl Ablett |
| 2nd Row | Danny Tickle | Jon Wilkin (c) |
| Lock | Sean O'Loughlin | Jamie Jones-Buchanan |
| Interchange | Rob Burrow | |
| Interchange | Lee Mossop | |
| Interchange | Gareth Carvell | Liam Farrell |
| Interchange | Jamie Jones-Buchanan | Scott Taylor |
| Coach | Steve McNamara | |
| 18th Man | Jon Wilkin | Josh Hodgson |

=== Exiles ===
The Exiles team originally were supposed to have another eight players for Game 1, most notably captain Brett Hodgson and half back Brett Finch because of injury, also missing due to injury was centre George Carmont, hooker Michael Monaghan, prop Lopini Paea, loose forward Luke O'Donnell and centre Setaimata Sa. Thomas Leuluai was named captain for Game 1 as Hodgson was injured. Due to a season-ending injury suffered in Game 1, stand in captain Thomas Leuluai missed Game 2.

Captain Brett Hodgson returned to the side for Game 2 from his injury. Joel Moon and Daniel Holdsworth came into the side for Game 2 as coach Daniel Anderson agreed with England that neither team will pick more than 3 players from a single club side, also Holdsworth came in due to the injury to Thomas Leuluai. In addition to this Steve Menzies, Heath L'Estrange, Lincoln Withers, Constantine Mika and Kylie Leuluai were all brought into the starting 17 due to various injuries.

| Position | Game 1 | Game 2 |
|---|---|---|
| Fullback | Shannon McDonnell | Brett Hodgson (c) |
| Wing | Joel Monaghan | |
| Centre | Daryl Millard | |
| Centre | Iosia Soliola | Joel Moon |
| Wing | Francis Meli | |
| Stand off | Thomas Leuluai (c) | Daniel Holdsworth |
| Scrum half | Scott Dureau | |
| Prop forward | Tony Puletua | Epalahame Lauaki |
| Hooker | Lance Hohaia | Heath L'Estrange |
| Prop | Jeff Lima | Anthony Laffranchi |
| 2nd-row | Willie Manu | |
| 2nd-row | Trent Waterhouse | Steve Menzies |
| Lock | David Fa’alogo | Iosia Soliola |
| Interchange | David Faiumu | Lincoln Withers |
| Interchange | Anthony Laffranchi | Constantine Mika |
| Interchange | Antonio Kaufusi | |
| Interchange | Epalahame Lauaki | Kylie Leuluai |
| Coach | Daniel Anderson | |
| 18th man | Patrick Ah Van | David Faiumu |
