= 2011 International Origin =

Rugby league match

England	Exiles
12	16
- Date: 10 June 2011
- Venue: Headingley, Leeds
- Man of the Match: Rangi Chase (Exiles)
- Referee: Richard Silverwood (England)
- Attendance: 14,174

The 2011 International Origin was the inaugural edition of the International Origin match in the sport of rugby league. This match was between England and Exiles RL, and created to give England good mid-season opposition in preparation for the 2011 Four Nations in November.

== Match details ==
10 June 2011

England	12 – 16	Exiles
Tries: Myler, J.Tomkins; Goals: Sinfield 2/2	(Report)	Tries: Manu, Meli, Carmont; Goals: Richards 2/3

Headingley, Leeds, England
Attendance: 14,174
Referee: Richard Silverwood
Player of the Match: Rangi Chase (Exiles)

England side consisted of 16 players who had played internationally for England or Great Britain in the past but handed a debut to Wigan Warriors hooker Michael McIlorum who started on the bench. Whilst Jamie Jones-Buchanan from Leeds Rhinos was the 18th man.

The Exiles coach Brian McLennan had originally picked Warrington Wolves centre Matt King in his starting line-up but due to King wanting to witness the birth of his child McLennan moved Sia Soliola from the second-row to centre, with Louis Anderson coming off the bench to start at second row, this allowed Glenn Morrison (the 18th man) to start on the bench.

1st half

Hull F.C.’s powerful second-rower Willie Manu provided the first try for the Exiles after Wigan Warriors Thomas Leuluai carved up the English defence and offloaded the ball. Winger Pat Richards provided the conversion. England soon hit back with prop James Graham making a half break before offloading the ball to Warrington Wolves scrum half Richie Myler to sprint 35 metres to score, Kevin Sinfield added the extras.

The Exiles were to strike next on the scoreboard though, some neat interplay from Rangi Chase, George Carmont and Glenn Morrison saw the Exiles go 55 metres in one play down the left before Leuluai found Brett Hodgson in the centre of the field who provided a nice cross field kick into the arms of Tony Puletua who simply tapped it infield to St Helens R.F.C. team mate Francis Meli who had the easiest of scores.

2nd half

However with 10 minutes to go Wigan Warriors second-rower Joel Tomkins intercepted a pass on his own 10 metre line and raced nearly the length of the field to score a try, Sinfield once again added the extras to put England into a 12-10 lead. But with a minute left on the clock, Chase offloaded a ball to Puletua who gave a pass to Carmont, Carmont then stepped inside to score the decisive try, Richards converted to give the Exiles their first International Origin win. Exiles stand-off Castleford Tigers Rangi Chase was the Man of the Match.

== Teams ==
=== England ===
Position	Game 1
Fullback	Sam Tomkins
Wing	Tom Briscoe
Centre	Chris Bridge
Centre	Michael Shenton
Wing	Ryan Hall
Stand Off	Kevin Sinfield
Scrum Half	Richie Myler
Prop	Jamie Peacock (c)
Hooker	Luke Robinson
Prop	James Graham
2nd Row	Jon Wilkin
2nd Row	Ben Westwood
Lock	Sean O'Loughlin
Interchange	Michael McIlorum
Interchange	Adrian Morley
Interchange	Gareth Carvell
Interchange	Joel Tomkins
Coach	Steve McNamara
18th Man	Jamie Jones-Buchanan

=== Exiles ===
The Exiles team originally was supposed to have Matt King lining up at centre however due to his baby's birth he withdrew himself in the week preceding the match allowing Iosia Soliola to move into the centre, Louis Anderson to second-row and Glenn Morrison onto the bench.

Position	Game 1
Fullback	Brett Hodgson
Wing	Pat Richards
Centre	George Carmont
Centre	Iosia Soliola
Wing	Francis Meli
Stand Off	Rangi Chase
Scrum Half	Thomas Leuluai
Prop forward	Tony Puletua
Hooker	Danny Buderus (c)
Prop	Mark O'Meley
2nd-row	Louis Anderson
2nd-row	Willie Manu
Lock	Craig Fitzgibbon
Interchange	David Faiumu
Interchange	Kylie Leuluai
Interchange	David Fa’alogo
Interchange	Glenn Morrison
Coach	Brian McLennan
18th man	Matt King
