= Joel Monaghan =

Australia international rugby league footballer

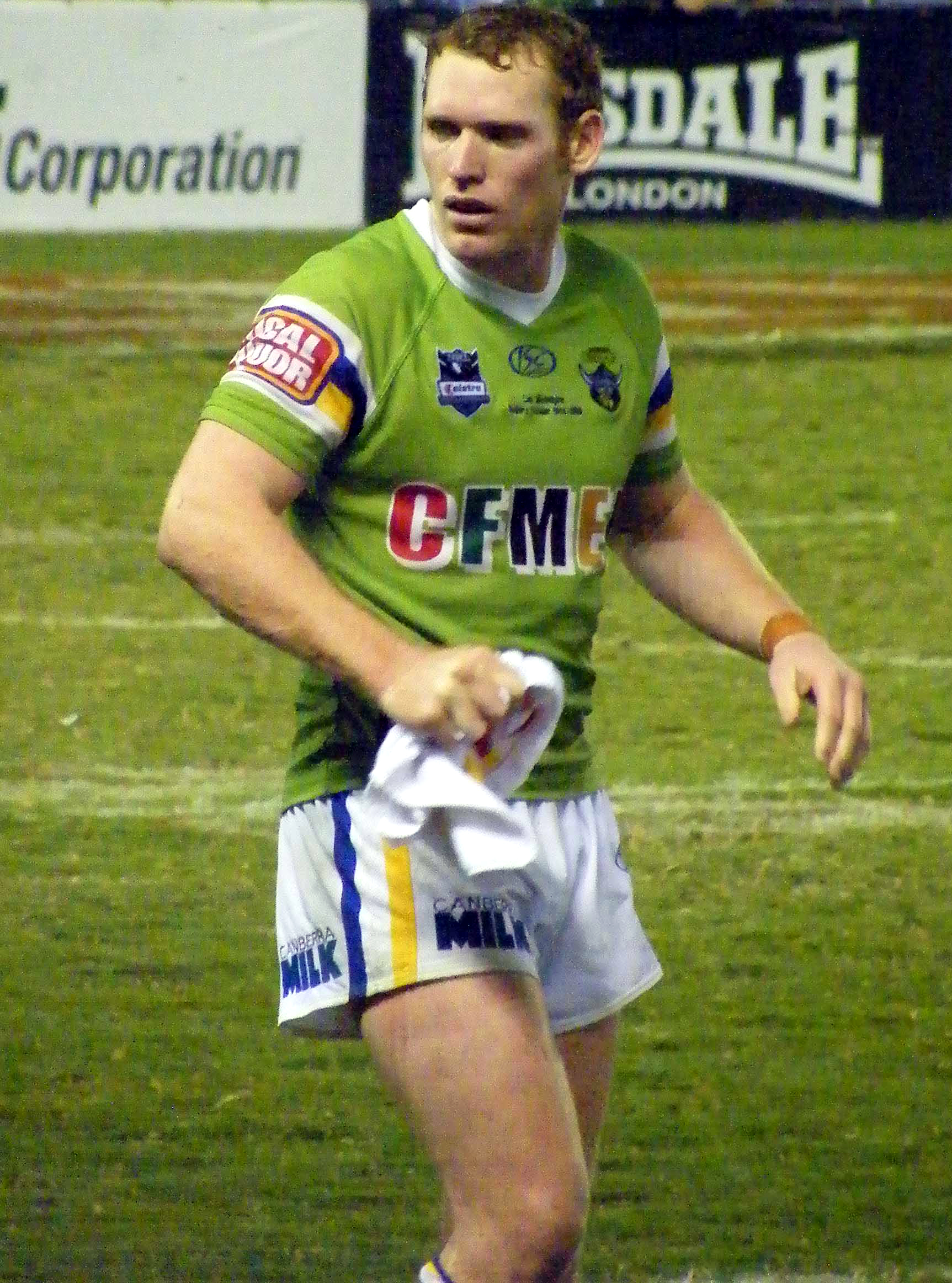

Personal information
- Born: 22 April 1982 (age 44) Canberra, Australian Capital Territory, Australia

Playing information
- Height: 189 cm (6 ft 2 in)
- Weight: 101 kg (15 st 13 lb)
- Position: Wing, Centre
Club
Years	Team	Pld	T	G	FG	P
2001–04	Canberra Raiders	66	39	5	0	160
2005–07	Sydney Roosters	44	23	0	0	92
2008–10	Canberra Raiders	55	28	1	0	114
2011–15	Warrington Wolves	145	145	2	0	584
2016–17	Castleford Tigers	34	13	0	0	52
2018–	Albury Thunder	1
	Total	345	248	8	0	1002
Representative
Years	Team	Pld	T	G	FG	P
2008–09	NSW Country	2	0	0	0	0
2008–10	New South Wales	2	0	0	0	0
2008	Australia	5	4	0	0	16
2011–13	Exiles	3	2	0	0	8
- Education: Erindale College, Canberra
- Relatives: Michael Monaghan (brother)

Joel Monaghan (born 22 April 1982) is an Australian former professional rugby league footballer who last played for the Castleford Tigers in the Super League. An Australian international and New South Wales State of Origin representative centre or winger, he previously played in the NRL for the Canberra Raiders and the Sydney Roosters.

== Background ==
Joel Monaghan was born in Canberra, Australian Capital Territory, Australia. Monaghan's junior development was influenced by National Rugby League coach Neil Henry who was Monaghan's coach at Erindale College, Canberra. While attending Erindale College, Monoghan played for the Australian Schoolboys team in 2000.

He is the younger brother of fellow rugby league player Michael Monaghan.

== Playing career ==
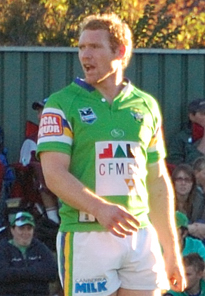
Monaghan playing for the Raiders in 2008

=== National Rugby League ===
Monaghan made his NRL début in 2001 for Canberra against the Penrith Panthers in round 10 and spent four seasons with the club.

He debuted for the Sydney Roosters in round 2005, against the South Sydney Rabbitohs. He missed much of the 2006 season after injuring his knee in a trail match against the St George Dragons then suffering later hamstring injuries during the year. He had a successful 2007 season at the Roosters scoring 13 tries in 17 games.

In 2008, Monaghan returned to the Canberra Raiders for the 2008 season. He won the Mal Meninga Medal for the club's Player of the Year. In August 2008, Monaghan was named in the preliminary 46-man Kangaroos squad for the 2008 Rugby League World Cup, and in October 2008 he was selected in the final 24-man Australia squad. He made his test début on the wing for Australia's opening game of the RLWC against New Zealand at the Sydney Football Stadium on Sunday, 26 October 2008. In the final, he made the mistake of tackling Lance Hohaia who was without the ball, which resulted in a penalty try, changing a two-point deficit to an 8-point deficit with only 10 minutes left.

After the end of the 2010 season, Monaghan was released from his contract with the Raiders at his request. His decision to leave the Raiders came after a photograph of him simulating a lewd act with a dog during Mad Monday celebrations was published on Twitter. The photograph was noted and discussed by media outlets around the world.

=== Super League ===
On 3 December 2010 it was announced that English Super League club Warrington Wolves had signed Monaghan on a one-year contract. There he joined his brother Michael Monaghan.

Monaghan was selected for the Exiles squad for the International Origin match against England at Headingley on 10 June 2011. However, he was not selected to play.

Monaghan was selected for the 2012 Exiles to face England by new coach Daniel Anderson, he started on the wing in Game 1.

He played in the 2012 Challenge Cup Final victory over the Leeds Rhinos at Wembley Stadium.

He played in the 2012 Super League Grand Final defeat by the Leeds Rhinos at Old Trafford.

Monaghan was selected to play for the Warrington Wolves on the wing in the 2013 Super League Grand final and scored the opening try in their loss against the Wigan Warriors at Old Trafford. He was the regular season's top try-scorer in 2014.

Castleford Tigers confirmed Monaghan's signing in October 2015. He joined the club on a two-year deal, seemingly in anticipation of Justin Carney's departure. Across his two seasons with the Tigers, Monaghan made 34 appearances and scored 13 tries.
