= Marley Leuluai =

New Zealand association football player

Personal information
- Full name: Marley Johannes Leuluai
- Date of birth: 8 November 2006 (age 20)
- Place of birth: Sydney, Australia
- Position: Midfielder

Team information
- Current team: Auckland FC
- Number: 18

Youth career
- 2017–2018: Blackburn Rovers
- 2018–2023: Manchester City
- 2023–2026: Burnley

Senior career*
| Years | Team | Apps | (Gls) |
| 2023–2026 | Burnley | 0 | (0) |
| 2026 | → Marine (loan) | 6 | (0) |
| 2026– | Auckland FC | 0 | (0) |

International career^{‡}
| 2023 | New Zealand U17 | 4 | (0) |
| Education | St Bede's College, Manchester |
| Father | Kylie Leuluai |
| Relatives | James Leuluai (uncle); Phillip Leuluai (uncle); Thomas Leuluai (cousin); Macgraff Leuluai (cousin) |
- * Club domestic league appearances and goals as of 26 April 2026 ‡ National team caps and goals as of 27 February 2024

Marley Johannes Leuluai (born 8 November 2006) is a professional footballer who plays as a midfielder for A-League Men club Auckland FC. He is the son of former rugby league international Kylie Leuluai. He is a New Zealand U17 international.

== Club career ==
=== Early career ===
Leuluai began his youth career with Blackburn Rovers after being spotted at a local tournament before joining the Manchester City academy in 2018. During his five years at City, he progressed through the club's academy system before joining Burnley at the end of the 2022–23 season. On his 17th birthday, in November 2023, he signed a professional contract with Burnley until 2026. In March 2026, he went on loan to National League North club Marine until the end of the season. He made 7 appearances during his loan spell, including 1 appearance in the FA Trophy.

He was released by Burnley on 10 June following the expiration of his contract.

=== Auckland FC ===
On 26 July, Leuluai featured as a trialist in Auckland FC's 2–0 pre-season friendly defeat to Tottenham Hotspur at Eden Park. Leuluai travelled with the club to Saudi Arabia as part of the squad for their match against Al-Ahli in the FIFA Intercontinental Cup, but was an unused substitute in the club's 1–0 defeat.

On 16 September, Leuluai joined the club after a successful trial period on a scholarship deal ahead of the 2026–27 season.

== International career ==
Leuluai captained the New Zealand side at matches at the 2023 OFC U-17 Championship in January 2023, which they won. He was selected for the New Zealand team for the 2023 FIFA U-17 World Cup held in Indonesia.

== Personal life ==
Leuluai was born in Manly, Sydney, Australia in 2006 when his father Kylie, was playing for NRL side Manly Sea Eagles. His cousins include Thomas Leuluai and Macgraff Leuluai while his uncle is James Leuluai. He started playing football at seven years-old, and was also a keen rugby league and tennis player. His father is of Samoan and Māori descent, and his mother is of Samoan and Dutch descent.

He joined the academy of Blackburn Rovers before moving on to the academy of Manchester City. Through an arrangement with the club he attended St Bede's College, Manchester.

== Career statistics ==
=== Club ===
As of match played 26 April 2026

| Club | Season | League | | | Cup | | Other | | Total | |
| Club | Season | Division | Apps | Goals | Apps | Goals | Apps | Goals | Apps | Goals |
|---|---|---|---|---|---|---|---|---|---|---|
| Burnley | 2025–26 | Premier League | 0 | 0 | 0 | 0 | — | | 0 | 0 |
| Marine (loan) | 2025–26 | National League North | 6 | 0 | 0 | 0 | 1 (Note: Appearances in FA Trophy) | 0 | 7 | 0 |
| Marine (loan) | Total | | 6 | 0 | 1 | 0 | 1 | 0 | 7 | 0 |
| Auckland FC | 2026–27 | A-League Men | 0 | 0 | — | | 0 | 0 | 0 | 0 |
| Carrer total | | | 6 | 0 | 1 | 0 | 0 | 0 | 7 | 0 |
