= Iosia Soliola =

NZ & Samoa international rugby league footballer

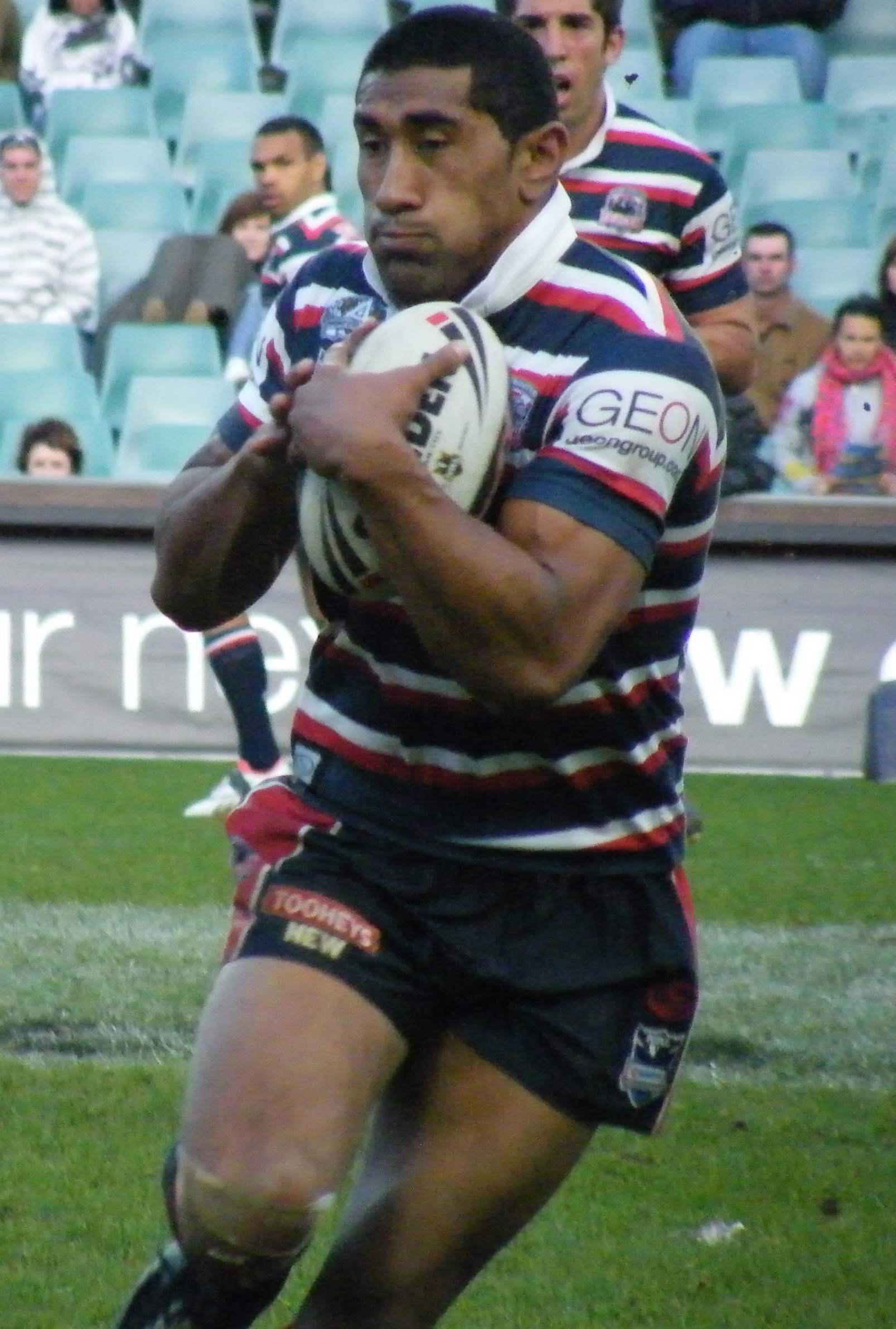

Personal information
- Full name: Iasa Iosia Soliola
- Born: 4 August 1986 (age 40) Auckland, New Zealand

Playing information
- Height: 184 cm (6 ft 0 in)
- Weight: 104 kg (16 st 5 lb)
- Position: Second-row, Centre, Prop, Lock
Club
Years	Team	Pld	T	G	FG	P
2005–09	Sydney Roosters	92	22	0	0	88
2010–14	St Helens	117	31	0	0	124
2015–21	Canberra Raiders	128	18	1	0	74
	Total	337	71	1	0	286
Representative
Years	Team	Pld	T	G	FG	P
2006–09	New Zealand	12	5	0	0	20
2011–13	Exiles	4	0	0	0	0
2013	Samoa	4	0	0	0	0

Iosia Soliola (born 4 August 1986) is a former professional rugby league footballer who last played for the Canberra Raiders in the National Rugby League (NRL). He played for New Zealand and Samoa at international level.

He previously played as a centre for the Sydney Roosters in the NRL, and as a second-row forward for St Helens in the Super League, with whom he won the 2014 Super League Grand Final. Whilst playing in Europe he gained selection for the Exiles.

== Background ==
Soliola was born in Auckland, New Zealand. He is of Samoan descent.

After making his début in Jersey Flegg, Soliola moved onto Premier League in which he played with Eli Hayes and won a premiership with the Roosters in 2004.

== Professional playing career ==
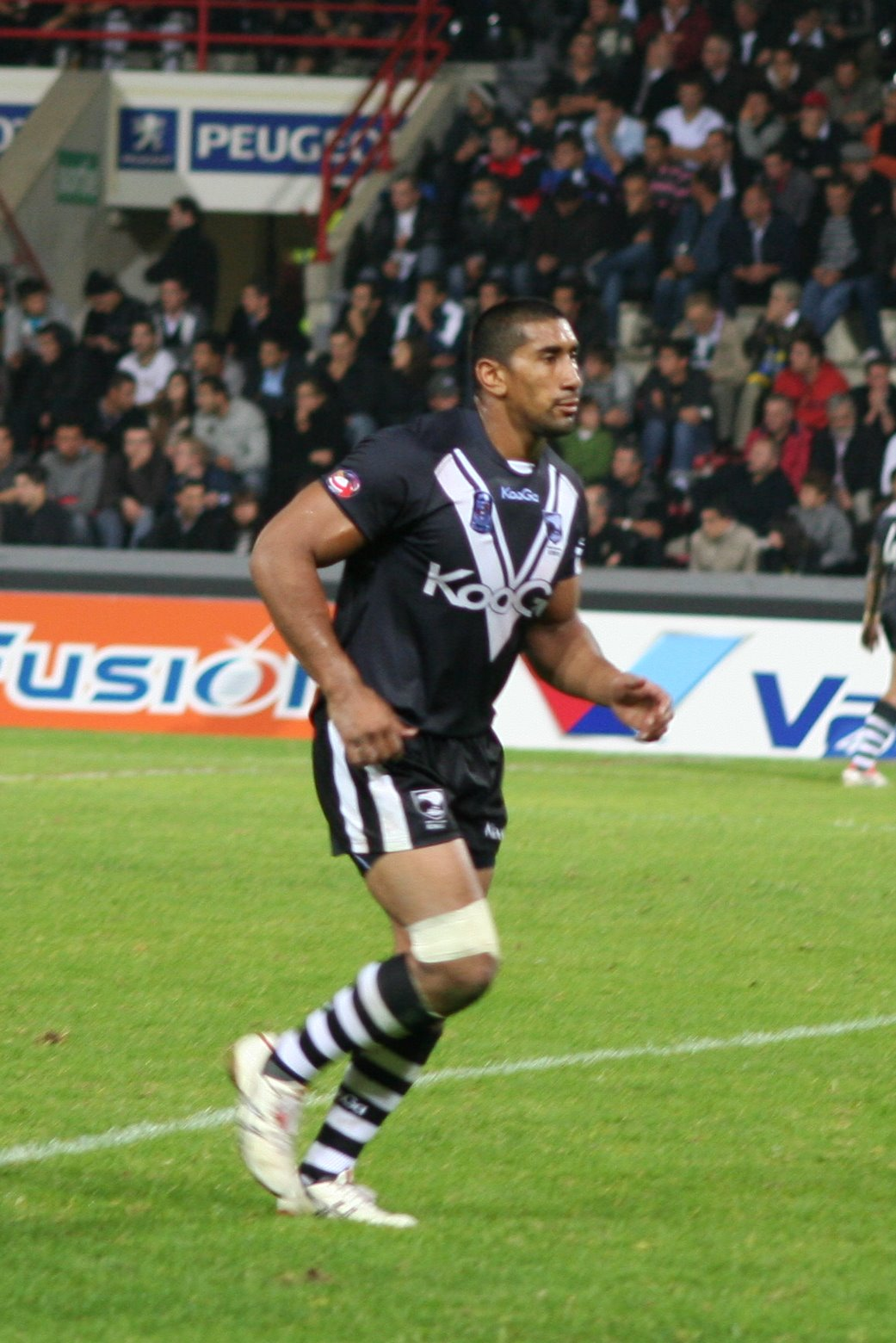
Soliola playing for New Zealand in 2009

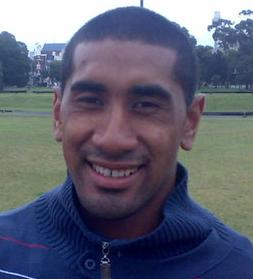
Iosia Soliola with the Sydney Roosters

=== 2000s ===
In 2005, Soliola made his NRL début for the Roosters against South Sydney, and went on to play 19 games for the club that season.

He was chosen to make his international début at the age of 19 for New Zealand in the Tri-nations series of 2005, however was forced to pull out due to injury.

Soliola then went on to represent New Zealand in the 2006 Tri-nations tournament. In 5 games, Soliola scored 4 tries including a double against the Australians at the Telstra Dome in Melbourne.

Soliola was selected to play for the New Zealand national team at centre in the 2007 ANZAC Test loss against Australia. He was dropped to premier league in the middle of the 2007 season before returning to first grade in round 14 and regained his form before he badly injured his knee in round 22 against the Wests Tigers. He missed the rest of the 2007 season.

Soliola returned from his lengthy spell on the sidelines in the off season to come off the bench in the Roosters' opening centenary clash against South Sydney in round 1. He also represented the Kiwis in the 100 year centenary test match where he scored one try.

In August, 2008 Soliola was named in the New Zealand training squad for the 2008 Rugby League World Cup, and in September, 2008 he was selected in the final 24-man New Zealand. He was forced to withdraw from the squad due to a shoulder injury.

The Sydney Roosters confirmed that Soliola had signed a three-year deal to play with English Super League club St. Helens midway through the 2009 NRL Season. Soliola played his last match for the tri colours against the North Queensland Cowboys, ending his 6-year stint with the club. Soliola also represented the Kiwis in the 2009 Four Nations tournament.

=== 2010s ===
Soliola officially made his début for St. Helens in 2010 making the 2010 Super League Grand Final.

Iosia Soliola was selected for the Exiles squad for the inaugural Rugby League International Origin Match against England.

In the 2011 game Soliola was supposed to play in the 2nd Row alongside Willie Manu, but due to the birth of Warrington Wolves' Matt King's baby, Soliola was moved by coach Brian McLennan to the centre.

New Exiles coach Daniel Anderson selected Soliola at centre for Game 1 of the International Origin. However he was moved into the loose forward role for Game 2 in which the Exiles won 32-20.

He played in the 2011 Super League Grand Final defeat by the Leeds Rhinos at Old Trafford.

He captained Samoa in the 2013 Rugby League World Cup.

On 12 April 2014, Iosia announced he would end his Super League career at the conclusion of the 2014 season., He agreed join the Canberra Raiders in 2015 on a two-year deal.

St Helens reached the 2014 Super League Grand Final, and Soliola was selected to play at second-row forward, scoring a try in their 14-6 victory over the Wigan Warriors at Old Trafford.

=== 2015 ===
Soliola came back to Australia to play with the Canberra Raiders. In his first season back in the NRL, Soliola made 19 appearances and scored 4 tries.

=== 2016 ===
In the 2016 NRL season, Soliola was part of the Canberra side which made it through to their first preliminary final in nearly 20 years. Canberra went on to lose the match against Melbourne 14-12.

=== 2017 ===
In the 2017 NRL season, Soliola was suspended for 5 weeks after a high shot on Melbourne's Billy Slater. On 2 September 2017, Soliola made his 150th appearance in the NRL for Canberra in their match against the Melbourne Storm.

=== 2018 ===
On 3 July, Soliola signed a two-year contract extension to keep him at Canberra until the end of the 2020 season.

=== 2019 ===
Soliola made 26 appearances for Canberra in the 2019 NRL season as the club reached the grand final for the first time in 25 years. Soliola played at prop in the club's 2019 NRL Grand Final defeat by the Sydney Roosters at ANZ Stadium. Soliola was awarded the Ken Stephen Medal at the official awards ceremony following the game for his involvement with the community in relation to rugby league.

=== 2020 ===
After playing the first eight games of the 2020 NRL season for the Raiders, Soliola suffered a horrific facial fracture during their 22-16 win against St. George Illawarra on 3 July. He returned from the injury for Canberra's round 20 match against the Cronulla-Sutherland Sharks and played a part in the side's finals campaign. On 6 October it was announced Soliola had re-signed with Canberra for the 2021 NRL season.

He played in all three of Canberra's finals games including the preliminary final defeat against Melbourne.

=== 2021 ===
On 28 September, Soliola announced his retirement from rugby league.
