= Lance Hohaia =

New Zealand rugby league footballer

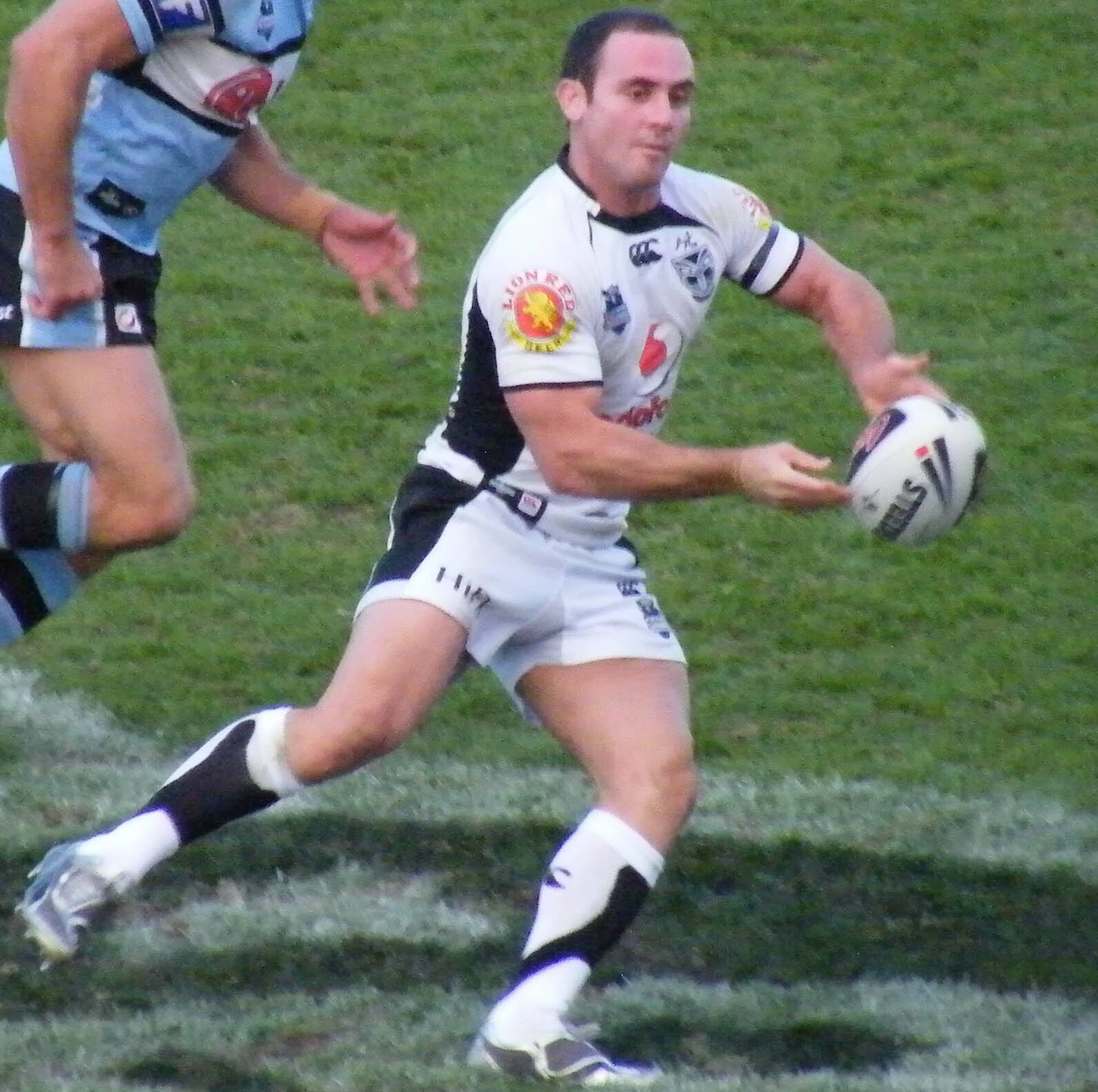

Personal information
- Full name: Lance Koro Hohaia
- Born: 1 April 1983 (age 43) Hamilton, New Zealand

Playing information
- Height: 175 cm (5 ft 9 in)
- Weight: 86 kg (13 st 8 lb)
- Position: Five-eighth, Fullback, Hooker, Halfback, Centre
Club
Years	Team	Pld	T	G	FG	P
2002–11	New Zealand Warriors	185	57	64	1	357
2012–15	St Helens	81	22	0	1	89
	Total	266	79	64	2	446
Representative
Years	Team	Pld	T	G	FG	P
2002–11	New Zealand	28	11	8	0	60
2012–13	Exiles	2	0	0	0	0

Coaching information
Club
Years	Team	Gms	W	D	L	W%
2021	Austin Armadillos	0	0	0	0

Lance Koro Hohaia (born 1 April 1983), also known by the nickname of "The Huntly Hurricane", is a New Zealand former professional rugby league footballer. A New Zealand international representative utility back, he played in the NRL for the New Zealand Warriors and the Super League for St Helens, with whom he won the 2014 Super League championship. In 2008 Hohaia was a member of the World Cup winning New Zealand team.

== Early years ==
Hohaia was born in Hamilton on New Zealand's North Island, but grew up in the town of Huntly, where he started to play for Huntly South Rugby League Club at the age of six, in 1989. The following year, he joined Taniwharau Rugby League Club.

Hohaia attended Huntly Primary, and Southwell School and St Paul's Collegiate School, both in Hamilton. Rugby union was the winter sport at Southwell, and at St Paul's, Hohaia played union for the school on Saturdays and league for Taniwharau on Sundays. He played his first senior game for Taniwharau in 2001, aged 17. Hohaia represented Waikato in 2001 and was also selected for the Northern Districts side that lost to the touring French side. After six Premier Division games for Taniwharau, he signed for Manurewa Marlins.

== Playing career ==
=== National Rugby League ===
Lance was signed by the New Zealand Warriors and he moved up to Auckland. He made his début in Round 4 2002 against the North Queensland Cowboys. Hohaia played for the Warriors from the interchange bench in their 2002 NRL Grand Final loss to the Sydney Roosters. Hohaia also made his international début for the Kiwis in 2002.

Hohaia had great utility value and was often used by the Warriors at dummy half. However this utility value worked against Lance, as he struggled to claim a regular starting spot in the Warriors lineup and was often in and out of the team. When not selected by the first grade side he has played for the Manurewa Marlins, Waicoa Bay Stallions and Auckland Vulcans in the Bartercard Cup and NSWRL Premier League.

In 2007 Hohaia spent most of the season at centre, due to injuries to the outside backs. However, in 2007 he was again selected for the Kiwis, this time for their tour of Great Britain. At the end of the season the Catalans Dragons were rumored to be interested in signing Hohaia to replace the retiring Stacey Jones, however Hohaia ultimately stayed with the Warriors.

In 2008, Hohaia took over the fullback role from the injured Wade McKinnon. In August 2008, Hohaia was named in the New Zealand training squad for the 2008 Rugby League World Cup. Hohaia was promising in McKinnon's absence leaving a dispute whether he should be played at fullback for the 2008 preliminary final. In October 2008, he was named in the final 24-man Kiwi squad. He played at fullback in every one of New Zealand's matches, including their victory in the final.

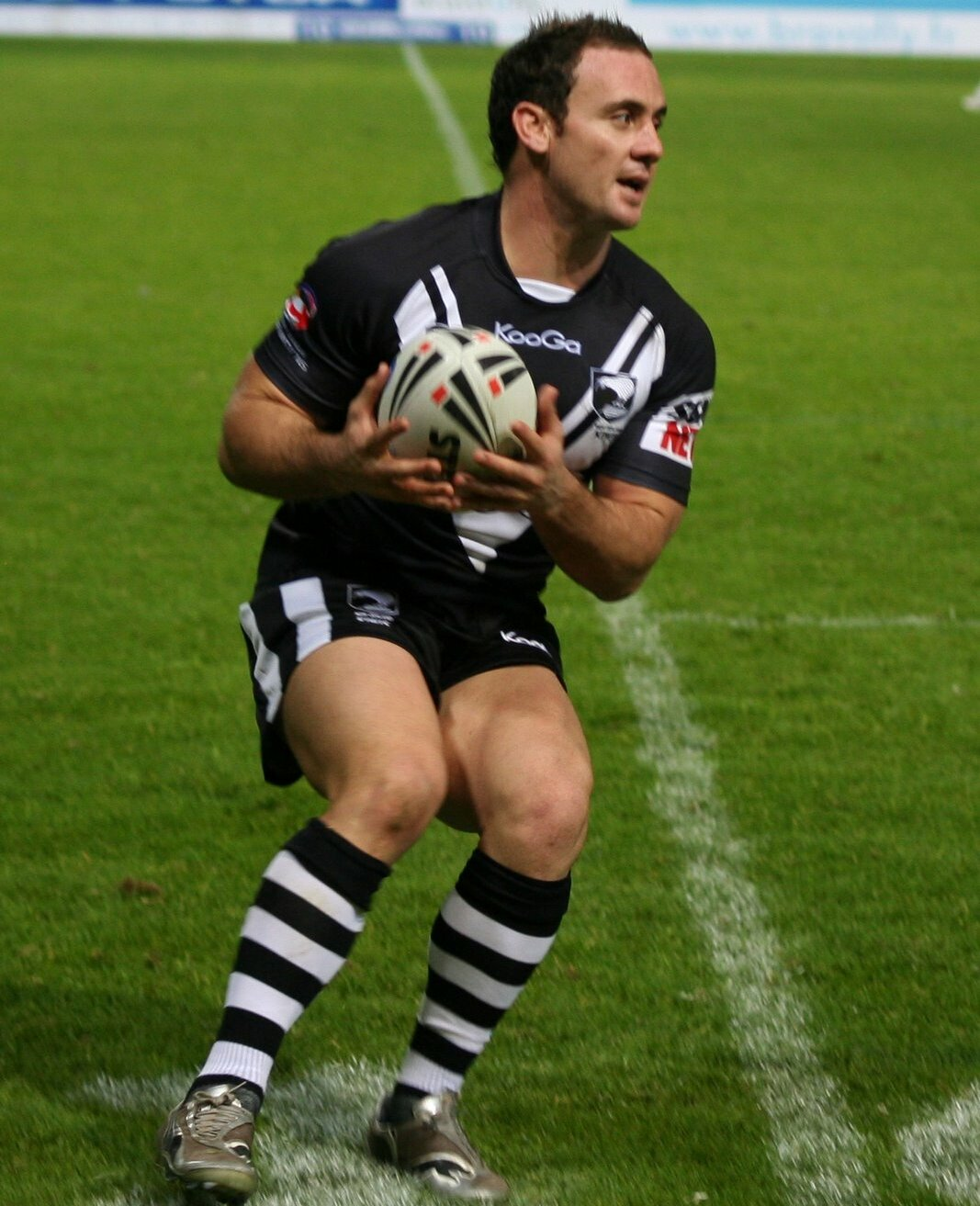
Hohaia playing for New Zealand in 2009

In 2009, Hohaia was injured in the first game of the season against the Eels, He made his comeback in round 5 against the Roosters where he played fullback in Wade McKinnon's absence. Hohaia was named at fullback in the mid season ANZAC Test against the Kangaroos. He also was selected for the Kiwis 24 man squad for the Four Nations tournament in Europe. He was selected to play fullback against both Tonga and Australia and won the man of the match award in the test vs Australia. In the Four Nations tournament, he appeared at fullback during most of the games and was one of the Kiwis' best players in the tournament. His efforts earned him a try against Australia and a double against France; one of which was a one hundred metre dash.

In 2010, Hohaia became the first-choice fullback ahead of Wade McKinnon. He played his 150th first grade game for the club. For the 2010 Anzac Test, Hohaia was selected to play for New Zealand at fullback in their loss against Australia.

==== Farewell ====
On 12 April 2011, it was announced that Hohaia had signed a 4-year contract with Super League club, St. Helens from 2012. On Sunday 13 November 2011 at a farewell function at the Taniwharau RLFC before departing for a 4 year deal sourced by player manager Peter Brown, with English Super League club St. Helens beginning 2012, President Takaroa Raihe bestowed an honorary membership for life, of the club on Lance Hohaia for his contribution to both junior and senior grade football. On Saturday 24 January 2015 as part of the Taniwharau RLFC 70 year anniversary celebrations, Hohaia was named five-eight and the Player of the 1st 70 Years from a club team full with local legends and ex-Kiwis.

=== Super League ===
Whilst playing for English club St. Helens, Hohaia was selected to play for the Exiles against England in the first game of the 2012 International Origin series.

St. Helens reached the 2014 Super League Grand Final and Hohaia was selected to play at stand-off. He was knocked unconscious by a punch from Ben Flower in the first few minutes of the match and had to leave the field for the remainder of the 14–6 victory over the Wigan Warriors at Old Trafford.

=== Retirement ===
After the punch incident in the St Helens v Wigan match Ben Flower was sent off however Hohaia suffered from ongoing concussion issues. After eight matches of the following season he was forced to retire from the game on 29 April 2015 because of the recurrent concussion symptoms.

After retiring he moved to Michigan with his wife and two sons where he now works as a real estate agent. His concussion issues have reportedly subsided.

== Legacy ==
In 2015, he was named as Taniwharau's best player of their first 70 years.

== Coaching ==
On 30 April 2021, it was announced that he had taken the head coach role of new US club Austin Armadillos in the inaugural season of the North American Rugby League for 2021.
