= George Carmont =

Former Samoa international rugby league footballer

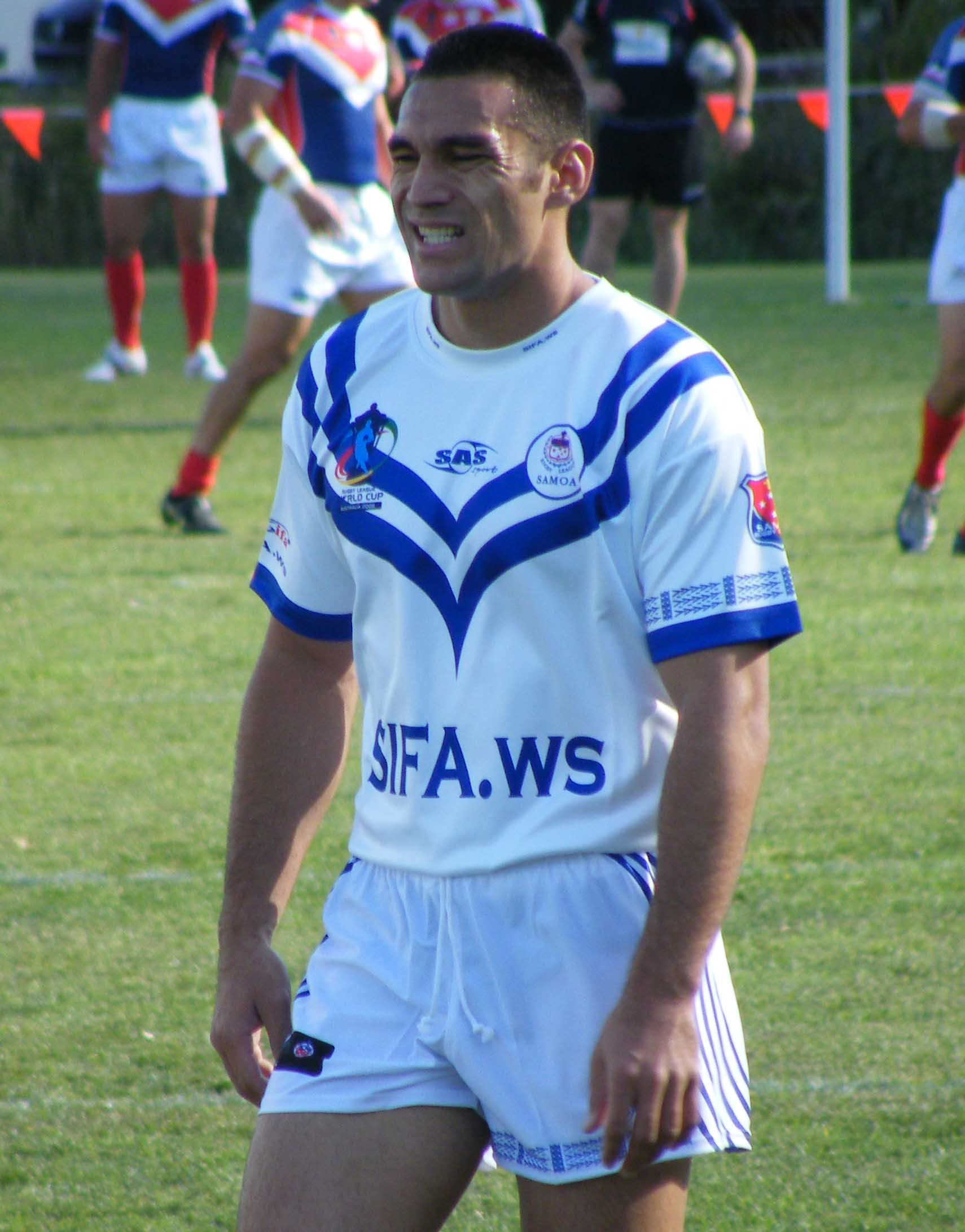

Personal information
- Born: 30 June 1978 (age 48) Auckland, New Zealand
- Height: 180 cm (5 ft 11 in)
- Weight: 91 kg (14 st 5 lb)

Playing information
- Position: Centre, Wing
Club
Years	Team	Pld	T	G	FG	P
2004–07	Newcastle Knights	83	33	0	0	132
2008–12	Wigan Warriors	153	79	0	0	270
	Total	236	112	0	0	402
Representative
Years	Team	Pld	T	G	FG	P
2006–10	Samoa	10	6	0	0	24
2011	Exiles	1	1	0	0	4
- Source: As of 4 October 2009

George Carmont (born 30 June 1978), also known by the nickname of "Chicken George" or "Gorgeous George", is a former Samoa international rugby league footballer who played as a centre for the Newcastle Knights in the National Rugby League (NRL) and the Wigan Warriors in the Super League.

== Early life ==
Carmont was born in Auckland, New Zealand. He was educated at De La Salle College, Mangere East.

== Club career ==
=== Youth career ===
Carmont's junior club was the Otahuhu Leopards in the Auckland Rugby League competition.

=== Newcastle Knights ===
Carmont made his professional rugby league début for the Newcastle Knights, against the Melbourne Storm on 11 March 2004. He appeared in 83 games and scored 33 tries along with becoming a popular player with the fans.

=== Wigan Warriors ===
On 27 November 2007, it was announced that Carmont had signed a two-year deal with Super League club Wigan. Carmont was named in the Super League Dream Team for 2008's Super League XIII.

He played in the 2010 Super League Grand Final victory over St. Helens at Old Trafford.

Carmont played for the Wigan Warriors in the 2011 World Club Challenge against 2010 NRL premiers, the St. George Illawarra Dragons, and scored two tries, but it was not enough to gain his side the victory.

2011's Super League XVI for Wigan Warriors started with a Magic Weekend match against St Helens, in which Carmont scored one try. He followed this up with another try against the Bradford Bulls in Round 2 late in the match. His next score was made in a loss against the Catalans Dragons in Round 8, before touching down a week later against Hull Kingston Rovers in Round 9.

Carmont played as a centre in the 2011 Challenge Cup Final 28–18 victory over the Leeds Rhinos at Wembley Stadium.

== International career ==
Carmont was selected in the Samoa squad for the 2008 Rugby League World Cup. He appeared in three matches for Samoa and scored two tries. He is eligible for the United States national rugby league team through his American Samoan descent.

Carmont was selected for the Exiles squad for the International Origin match against England at Headingley on 10 June 2011.

On 3 November 2011 The annual RLIF Awards dinner was held at the Tower of London, and Carmont was named Samoa player of the year.

== Later years ==
Carmont trained briefly with the New Zealand Warriors in 2013, but ultimately did not join the team and retired.

In 2015 Carmont joined the New Zealand Warriors as an assistant coach for the NSW Cup side. He played one game for the team during the season, scoring a try in the match. He again made a one-match comeback in 2016.

George has now made a name for himself as a frequent visitor at Las Vegas 7s

== Honours ==
=== Wigan Warriors ===
- Super League
  - Winners (1): 2010
- League Leaders' Shield
  - Winners (2): 2010, 2012
  - Runner-up (1): 2011
- Challenge Cup
  - Winners (1): 2011
- World Club Challenge
  - Runner-up (1): 2011

=== Individual ===
- Super League Dream Team
  - Winners (3): 2008, 2011, 2012
- Wigan Warriors Player of the Year
  - Winners (1): 2012
