= Francis Meli =

New Zealand and Samoa international rugby league footballer

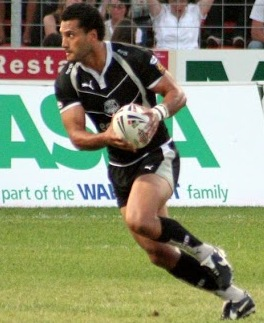

Personal information
- Full name: Francis Meli
- Born: 27 April 1979 (age 47) Apia, Western Samoa

Playing information
- Height: 188 cm (6 ft 2 in)
- Weight: 100 kg (15 st 10 lb)
- Position: Wing, Centre
Club
| Years | Team | Pld | T | G | FG | P |
|---|---|---|---|---|---|---|
| 1998–05 | New Zealand Warriors | 110 | 60 | 0 | 0 | 240 |
| 2006–13 | St Helens | 223 | 145 | 0 | 0 | 580 |
| 2014 | Salford Red Devils | 19 | 14 | 0 | 0 | 56 |
| | Total | 352 | 219 | 0 | 0 | 876 |
Representative
| Years | Team | Pld | T | G | FG | P |
| 2000–10 | Samoa | 7 | 2 | 0 | 0 | 8 |
| 2001–04 | New Zealand | 14 | 6 | 0 | 0 | 24 |
| 2011–12 | Exiles | 3 | 4 | 0 | 0 | 16 |

Francis Meli (born 27 April 1979) is a former professional rugby league footballer who played in the 1990s, 2000s and 2010s. A Samoa and New Zealand international representative centre or winger, he played in the National Rugby League for New Zealand club, Auckland Warriors before playing in the Super League for English clubs, St Helens and Salford.

== Background ==
Born in Apia, Samoa on 27 April 1979, Meli grew up in the Auckland suburb of Titirangi, Meli began his rugby league career at the age of 9 when he joined the Avondale Wolves. He eventually joined City Marist and played for the Marist Saints in the Auckland Rugby League.

== Club career ==
=== New Zealand Warriors ===
Meli was then signed by the Auckland Warriors, and made his NRL début against the South Sydney Rabbitohs on 2 May 1999. Due to a feeder arrangement with the Warriors, Meli also played several games for Brisbane Souths in the Queensland Cup.

He played for the Warriors on the wing in their 2002 NRL Grand Final loss to the Sydney Roosters. In the post-season Meli was selected to go on the 2002 New Zealand rugby league tour of Great Britain and France. He was played on the wing in five test matches and scored 4 tries.

Meli scored a club record 23 tries for the Warriors in the 2003 NRL season. He scored 5 of those tries in a single finals game against the Canterbury Bulldogs, a feat still unbeaten in the finals. He played his 50th match for the club on 6 April 2003 and his 100th match against the Wests Tigers on 9 April 2005. He was named the 2003 New Zealand Warriors’ Player of the Year.

=== St Helens ===
At the start of 2006 Meli joined St. Helens. He played for St Helens on the wing in their 2006 Challenge Cup Final victory against the Huddersfield Giants.

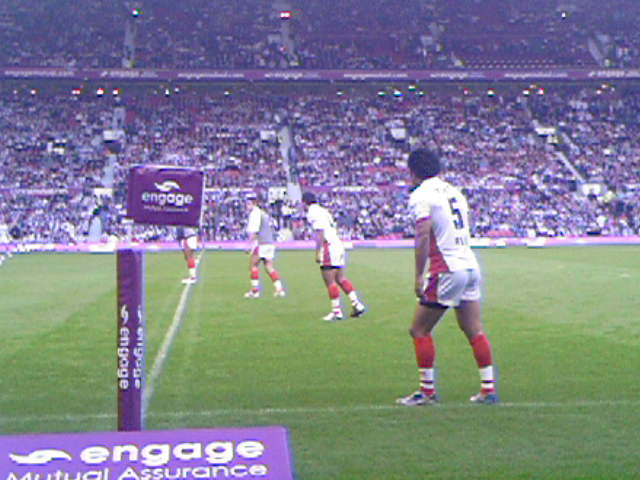
Meli warming up for St Helens in the 2006 Super League Grand Final against Hull F.C. at Old Trafford

St Helens reached the 2006 Super League Grand final to be contested against Hull FC, and Meli played on the wing, scoring a try in Saints' 26-4 victory.

As 2006 Super League champions, St Helens faced 2006 NRL Premiers the Brisbane Broncos in the 2007 World Club Challenge. Meli played on the wing in the Saints' 18-14 victory.

In his first three years at the club he acquired three Challenge Cup winning medals, a World Club Challenge winning medal and a Grand Final winning ring. He also played in 2008's Super League XIII Grand Final defeat by the Leeds Rhinos.

Visa issues due to the United Kingdom's new requirements curtailed the start of his 2009 campaign; however, these issues were suffered by many imports that season. He arrived back in the country five rounds late and was forced to start his season in the reserves.

He played in the 2009 Super League Grand Final defeat by the Leeds Rhinos at Old Trafford.

At the start of 2010 Meli was granted compassionate leave to briefly return to New Zealand.

He played in the 2011 Super League Grand Final defeat by the Leeds Rhinos at Old Trafford.

=== Salford Red Devils ===
Meli played for Super League side Salford Red Devils for the 2014 season after signing a one-year contract at the club. Meli retired at the conclusion of the 2014 season after failing to be offered a new contract.

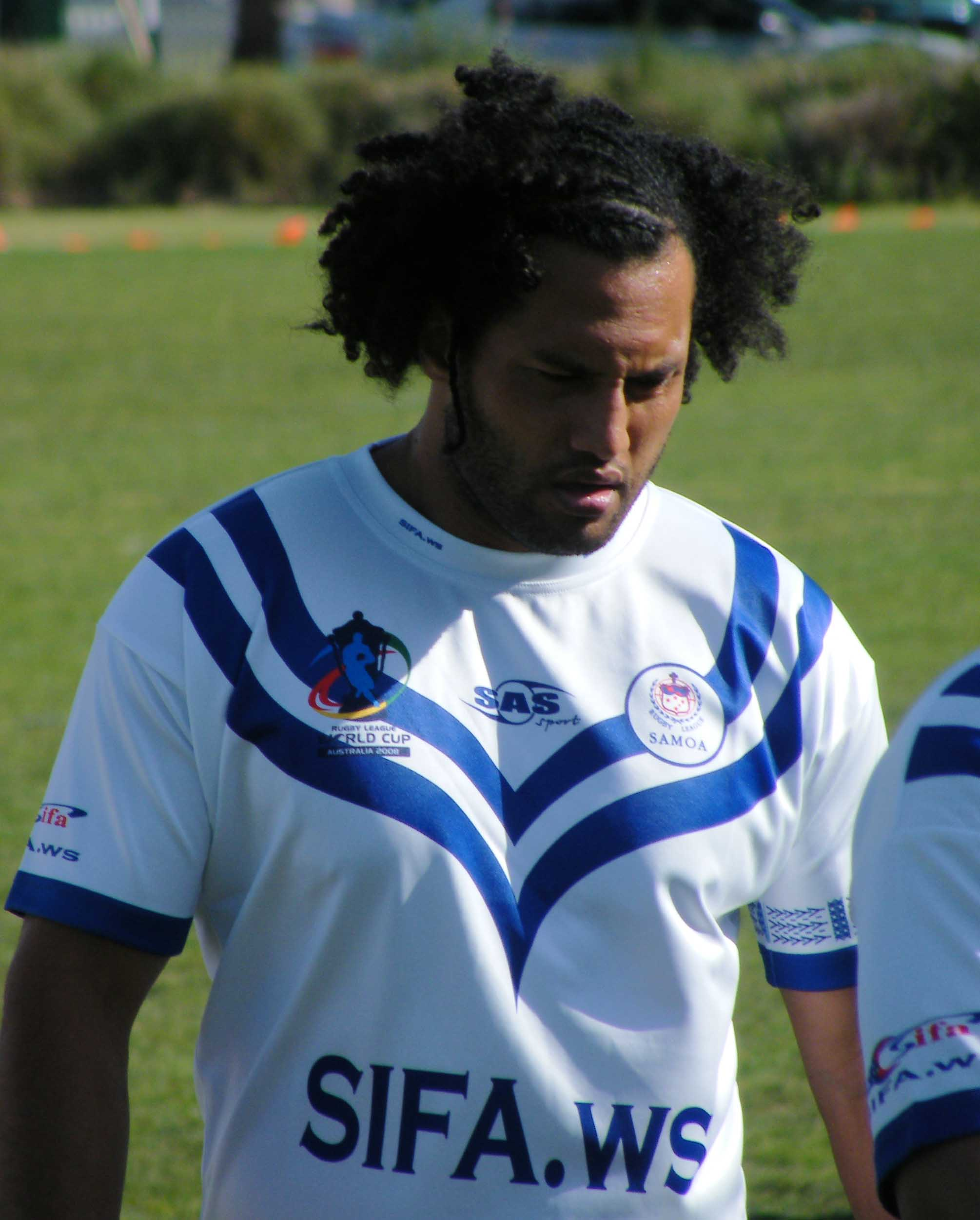
Meli in action for Samoa in 2008

== International career ==
=== Samoa ===
Meli played for Samoa in the 2000 World Cup.

=== New Zealand ===
In 2001 he then switched allegiance to New Zealand, playing in 14 test matches between 2001 and 2004.

Meli was selected to play on the wing for New Zealand in the 2004 Anzac Test against Australia in Newcastle, New South Wales, the Kiwis losing to the Kangaroos 10-37. At the end of the season he was also selected to play for New Zealand on the wing in all four of their matches at the 2004 Rugby League Tri-Nations.

=== Samoan return ===
In 2008 Meli played for Samoa in the World Cup.

Meli was named in the Samoan squad for the 2009 Pacific Cup.

=== Exiles ===
Meli was selected to play for the Exiles by coach Brian McLennan. He started the game on the wing against England, and scored a try in the 16-12 Exiles win. Francis was selected again to represent the Exiles by new coach Daniel Anderson, Meli started Game 1 on the wing and scored a try in the 18-10 loss to England. Meli also featured on the wing for Game 2 and was instrumental in helping the Exiles to a 32-20 win by scoring 2 tries and helping the Exiles retain the International Origin trophy.

== Post-playing career and personal life ==
In 2022, Meli was drafted in as a replacement for Shontayne Hape as a on-field player for Match Fit. He is also the mental health coach for the group as he is child case manager with New Zealand Police since retiring from the game. He has a wife and 3 girls, as of 2022, the oldest was 16 and the youngest 2.
