= Kylie Leuluai =

Former Samoa international rugby league footballer

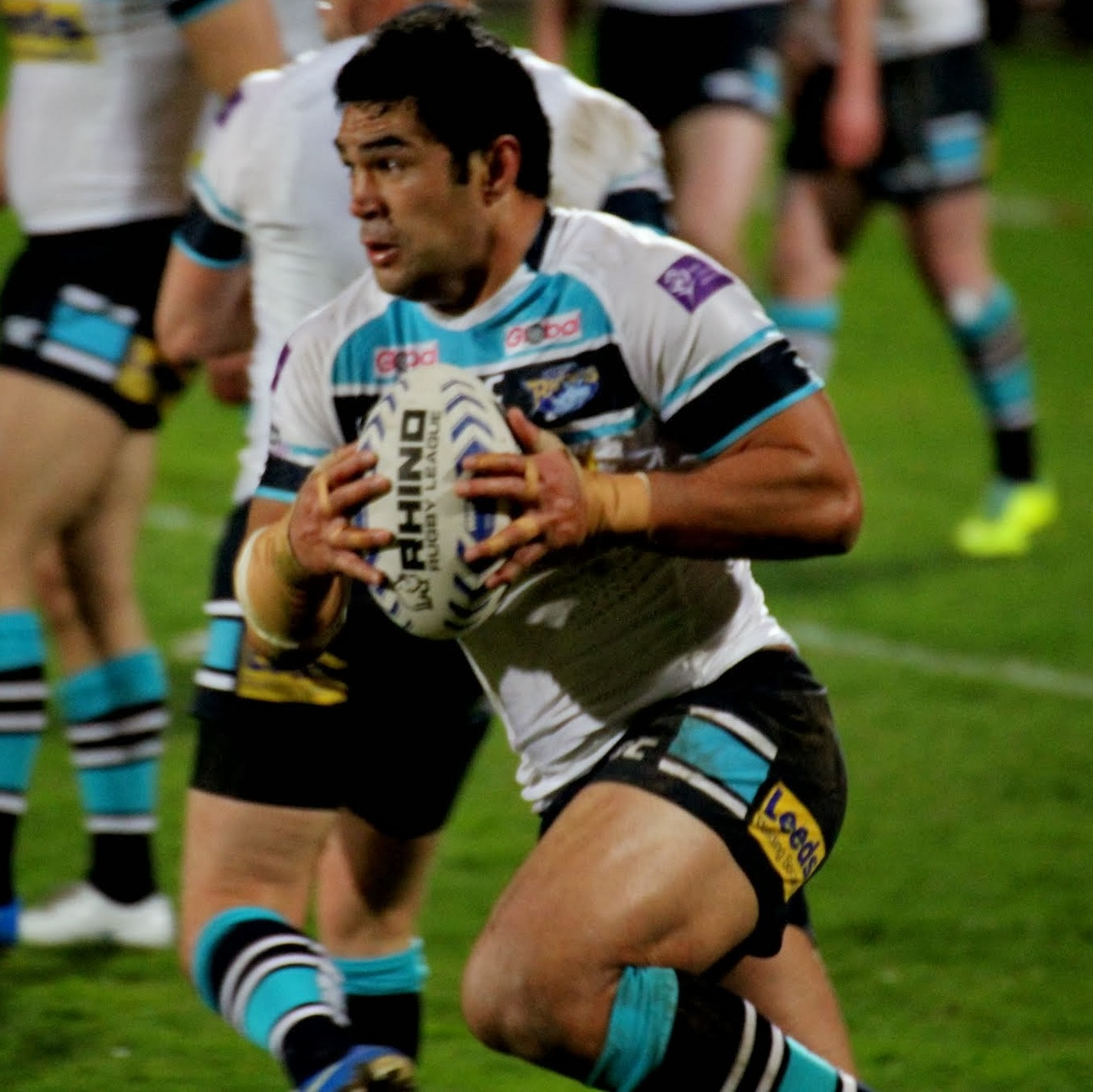

Personal information
- Full name: Kylie Macgraff Leuluai
- Born: 29 March 1978 (age 48) Auckland, New Zealand

Playing information
- Height: 178 cm (5 ft 10 in)
- Weight: 107 kg (16 st 12 lb)
- Position: Prop
Club
Years	Team	Pld	T	G	FG	P
1999	Balmain Tigers	7	0	0	0	0
2000	Wests Tigers	2	0	0	0	0
2002	Sydney Roosters	5	0	0	0	0
2003	Parramatta Eels	7	0	0	0	0
2004–06	Manly Sea Eagles	57	4	0	0	16
2007–15	Leeds Rhinos	258	22	0	0	88
	Total	336	26	0	0	104
Representative
Years	Team	Pld	T	G	FG	P
1998–00	New Zealand Māori	2	0	0	0	0
2006–08	Samoa	5	1	0	0	4
2011–12	Exiles	2	0	0	0	0
- Relatives: James Leuluai (uncle); Phillip Leuluai (uncle); Thomas Leuluai (cousin); Macgraff Leuluai (cousin); Marley Leuluai (son)

Kylie Leuluai (born 29 March 1978) is a New Zealand former professional rugby league footballer. A New Zealand Māori and Samoa international representative prop, he most notably played at club level for the Leeds Rhinos in the Super League. He also played club football in Australia for National Rugby League clubs; the Balmain Tigers, Wests Tigers, Sydney Roosters, Parramatta Eels, and the Manly Warringah Sea Eagles.

Leuluai was a massive part of the Leeds Rhinos success during his nine seasons at the club, winning a total of six Grand Finals, two World Club Challenges and two Challenge Cups in that time to make him the most successful overseas player in the club's history.

== Background ==
Leuluai was born in Auckland, New Zealand. He attended the Church College of New Zealand in Hamilton, New Zealand, playing both Rugby union and league.

== Playing career ==
Leuluai played for Balmain, Wests Tigers, Sydney Roosters, Parramatta, and Manly in the NRL. In 2007, he joined Super League club Leeds.

In 2007 Leuluai played for Leeds in the 2007 Super League Grand Final victory over St. Helens. The Leeds club defeated the Saints 33–6.

In 2008 Leuluai played for Leeds in the 2008 World Club Challenge against Melbourne. The Leeds side defeated Melbourne 18–10. Later that year, Leeds once again made it to the 2008 Super League Grand Final against St. Helens. They defeated Saints 24–16.

In 2009, Leuluai played for the Leeds in the 2009 World Club Challenge against Manly. The Leeds side were defeated by Manly 28–20.

He played in the 2009 Super League Grand Final victory over St. Helens at Old Trafford.

In 2010, Leuluai played for Leeds in the 2010 World Club Challenge against Melbourne. The Leeds side were defeated by Melbourne 18–10. It was later found that Melbourne were in serious breach of the NRL Salary Cap Rules and they had the Title stripped from them. It is well known, yet unofficial that this action automatically made the Leeds outfit World Club Champions of 2010.

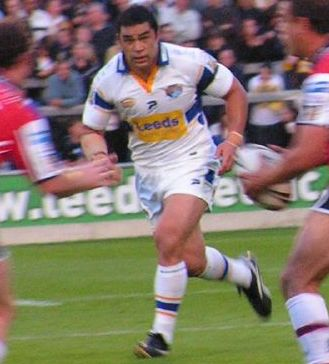
Leuluai playing for Leeds

He played in the 2010 Challenge Cup Final defeat by the Warrington Wolves at Wembley Stadium.

In June 2011, Leuluai announced he will retire at the end of the 2012 season, signing a new one-year contract with Leeds in the process.

Later that year he played at prop for Leeds in the 2011 Challenge Cup Final defeat by Wigan at Wembley Stadium. He played in the 2011 Super League Grand Final victory over St. Helens at Old Trafford.

Towards the end of 2011, Leuluai announced he would play on into 2012, but would retire at the end of the 2013 Super League Season.

In 2012 Leuluai played for the Leeds in the 2012 World Club Challenge against Manly. Leeds beat Manly 26–12. He played in the 2012 Challenge Cup Final defeat by Warrington at Wembley Stadium. Leeds went on to win the 2012 Super League Grand Final with victory over Warrington at Old Trafford. Towards the end of 2012, Leuluai announced he would play on into 2013, but would retire at the end of the 2014 Super League Season.

In 2013 Leuluai played for Leeds in the 2013 World Club Challenge against Melbourne. Leeds were defeated by Melbourne 18–14. Leuluai once again halted his retirement plans by announcing he would play on into the 2014 Super League Season, but would hang up his boots at the end of 2014.

In 2014, Leuluai played in the 2014 Challenge Cup Final victory over the Castleford Tigers at Wembley Stadium.

Surprisingly enough, Leuluai halted his retirement plans yet again and announced he would play on into the 2015 Super League Season, but would most definitely hang up his boots at the end of 2015 along with fellow Prop Forward Jamie Peacock MBE.

In June 2015, Leuluai once again announced his intention to retire at the end of 2015, saying that he felt it was time to move on to a new challenge. Leuluai expected to be staying on and working with the club on a part-time basis while studying at university as well. He played in the 2015 Challenge Cup Final victory over Hull Kingston Rovers at Wembley Stadium. On 3 July 2015, Leuluai scored a try on his 250th appearance for Leeds against reigning Super League champions St Helens as Leeds completed the double with a ruthless 46–18 victory to go three points clear of them with just three games left before the start of the Super 8s. Leuluai would finish his career with a sixth Grand Final victory with Leeds after defeating Wigan in the 2015 Grand Final at Old Trafford.

== Representative career ==
Leuluai played for New Zealand Māori in 1998 and at the 2000 World Cup.

Leuluai was named in the Samoa training squad for the 2008 Rugby League World Cup.

In 2009 he was named as part of the Samoan side for the Pacific Cup. He was named Samoan player of the year for 2009.

=== Rugby League International Origin Match ===
Kylie Leuluai was selected for the Exiles squad for the International Origin match against England at Headingley on 10 June 2011.

== Honours ==
=== Club ===
- Super League (6): 2007, 2008, 2009, 2011, 2012, 2015
- World Club Challenge (2): 2008, 2012
- League Leader's Shield (2): 2009, 2015
- Challenge Cup (2): 2014, 2015

== Personal life ==
He is the father of Burnley FC defender Marley Leuluai.

James Leuluai is his uncle and his cousins are Thomas Leuluai and Macgraff Leuluai.

Kylie belongs to the Church of Jesus Christ of Latter-day Saints and is renowned for being able to bench press 225 kg – the heaviest weight lifted by an NRL player.

== Career highlights and honours ==
- Junior Club: Papatoetoe Panthers
- Wests Tigers
- Sydney Roosters
- Parramatta Eels
- Manly-Warringah Sea Eagles 2004–06
- Super League Championship: member of the 2007 Championship Leeds Rhinos Team
- Super League Championship: member of the 2008 Championship Leeds Rhinos Team
- Super League Championship: member of the 2009 Championship Leeds Rhinos Team
- Super League Championship: member of the 2011 Championship Leeds Rhinos Team
- Exiles: member of the 2012 Winning Team against England Rugby League
- Super League Championship: member of the 2012 Championship Leeds Rhinos Team
- Challenge Cup Winners: member of the 2014 Challenge Cup Winners Leeds Rhinos Team
