= Tony Puletua =

Former New Zealand and Samoa international rugby league footballer

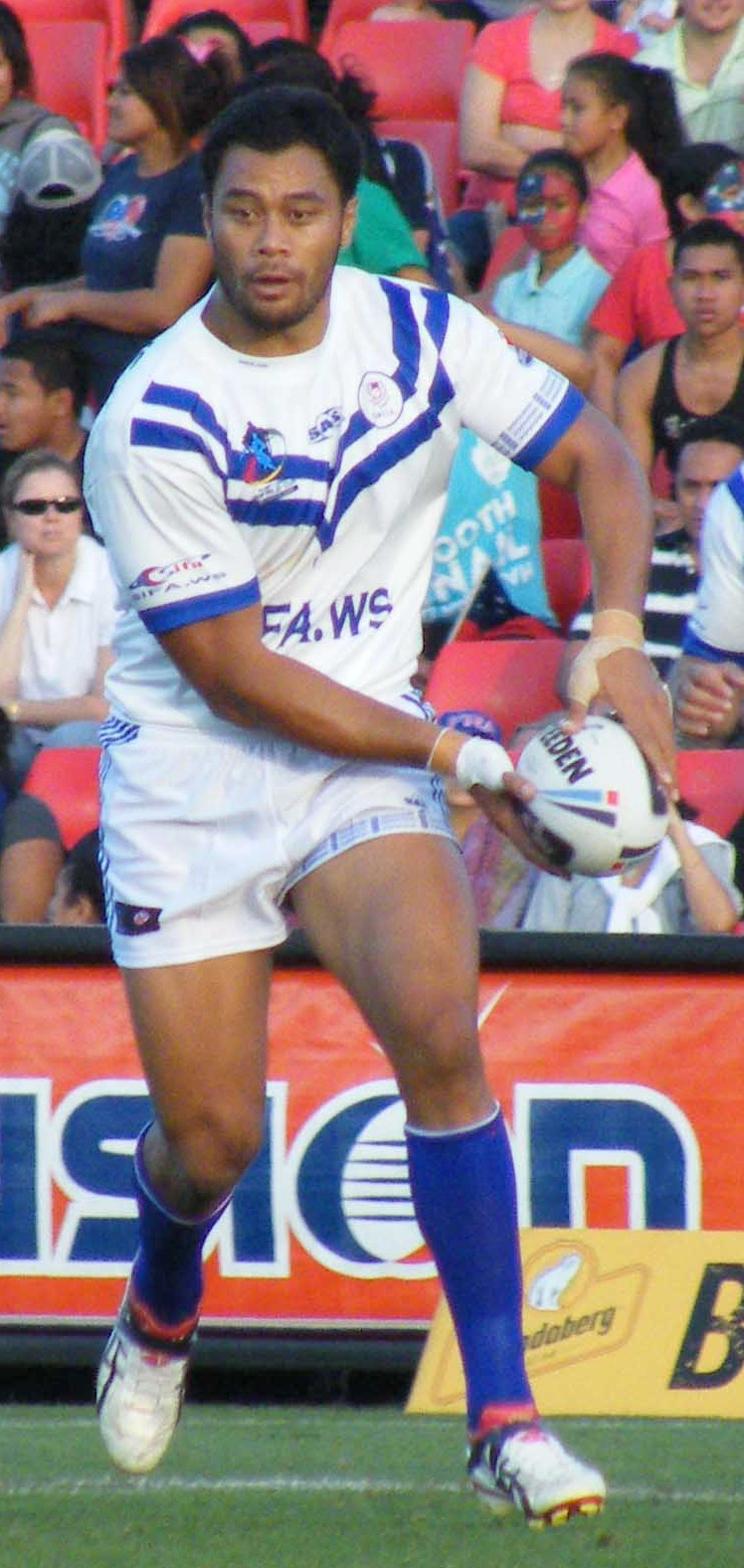

Personal information
- Full name: Anthony Puletua
- Born: 25 June 1979 (age 47) Auckland, New Zealand

Playing information
- Height: 1.92 m (6 ft 3 1/2 in)
- Weight: 112 kg (17 st 9 lb)
- Position: Second-row, Prop
Club
Years	Team	Pld	T	G	FG	P
1997–08	Penrith Panthers	211	40	0	0	160
2009–13	St Helens	137	40	0	0	160
2014–15	Salford Red Devils	27	3	0	0	12
2015(loan)	→ Hull Kingston Rovers	14	1	0	0	4
	Total	389	84	0	0	336
Representative
Years	Team	Pld	T	G	FG	P
1998–07	New Zealand	22	4	0	0	16
2008–13	Samoa	9	1	0	0	4
2011–12	Exiles	2	0	0	0	0
- Relatives: Frank Puletua (brother)

Anthony Puletua (born 25 June 1979), also known by the nickname of "TP", is a former professional rugby league footballer who last played for Hull Kingston Rovers in the Super League. A New Zealand and Samoan international, Puletua previously played for the Penrith Panthers in the National Rugby League competition, primarily as second-row forward.

Puletua joined Hull Kingston Rovers, on loan in 2015 from the Salford Red Devils. He made 13 appearances, scoring one try for Hull Kingston Rovers, and retired on 18 September 2015.

== Background ==
Puletua was born in Auckland, New Zealand. He is of Samoan descent.

== Penrith Panthers ==
Puletua played his junior rugby league with the St Mary's Saints before being signed by the Penrith Panthers. Puletua made his debut for the Penrith Panthers in 1997 and played at second row in the Panthers team which defeated the Sydney Roosters in the 2003 NRL Grand final. As 2003 NRL premiers, the Panthers travelled to England to face Super League VIII champions, the Bradford Bulls in the 2004 World Club Challenge. Puletua played at second-row forward in the Panthers' 22–4 loss. He was captain of the team from January 2006. Puletua's brother, Frank, also played for the Penrith Panthers, retiring from professional rugby league in April 2011. On 4 October 2006, TP was selected to be a part of the Perinth Panthers' Team Legends. Used to celebrate the 40th anniversary of the Panthers, Puletua was alongside Penrith legends Mark Geyer, Brad Fitler and Rhys Wesser.

== St Helens ==
Puletua joined St Helens at the end of the 2008 season on a three-year deal.

He played in the 2009 Super League Grand Final defeat by the Leeds Rhinos at Old Trafford.

He played in the 2011 Super League Grand Final defeat by the Leeds Rhinos at Old Trafford.

== Salford Red Devils ==
Puletua joined the Salford Red Devils for the 2014 season. He made 26 appearances for the club in 2014, but the club was later fined £5,000 for breaching the salary cap.

== Hull KR ==
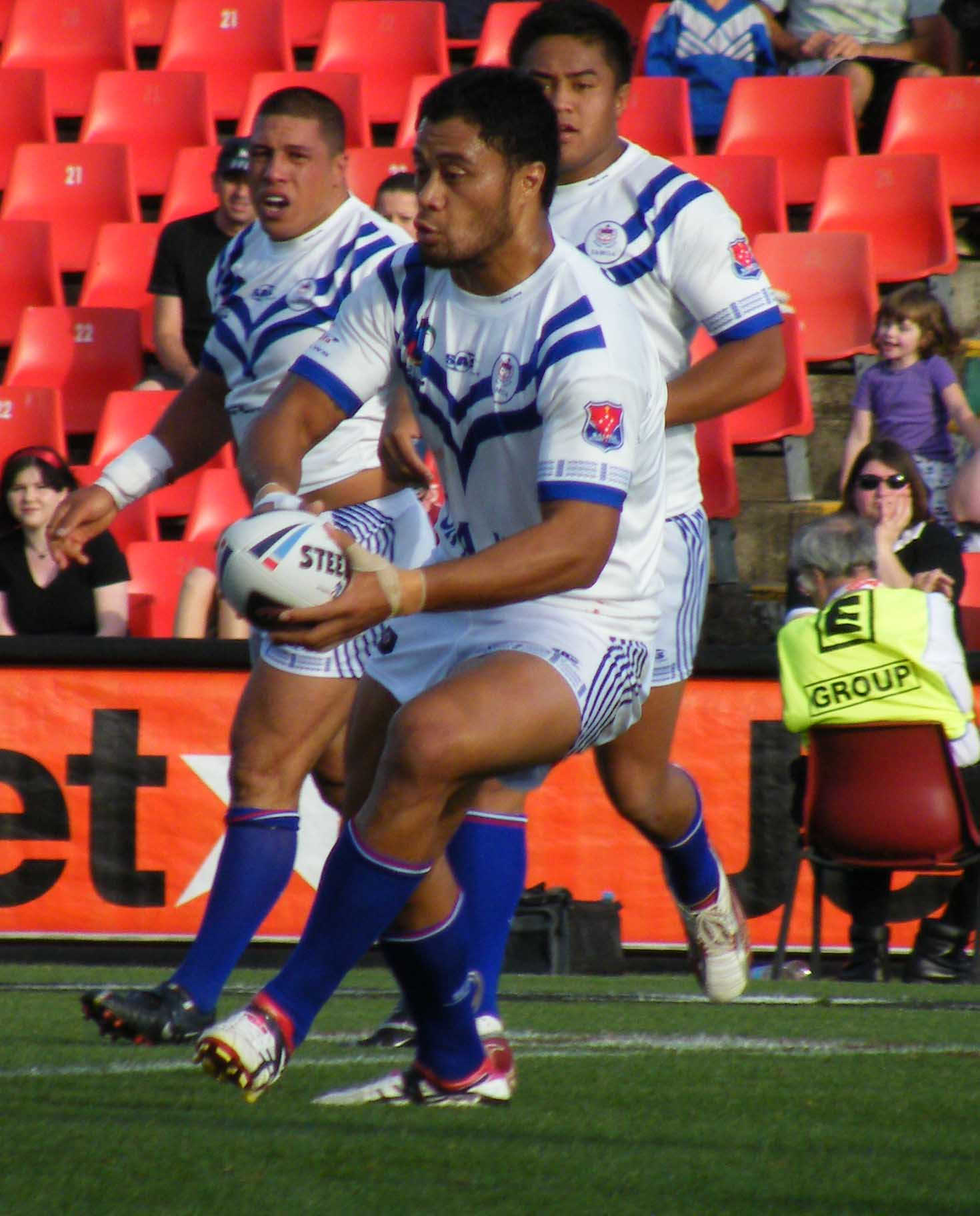
Puletua playing for Samoa

Puletua joined Hull Kingston Rovers mid-season in 2015 on a season-long loan from Salford, and announced that he would retire from the game following his spell with Hull KR.

== Representative football ==
Puletua represented the New Zealand national team on 22 occasions following his début in 1998, including the 2000 World Cup. His last selection was for New Zealand against Australia in the ANZAC Test on 20 April 2007 as a replacement for the injured David Kidwell. After that, he switched his allegiance to Samoa.

Puletua was named in the Samoa squad for the 2008 Rugby League World Cup, and played in three matches. In 2009 he was named as part of the Samoan side for the Pacific Cup.

Puletua was called up to the Samoan squad as an injury replacement during the 2013 World Cup.

== Career highlights ==
- First Grade Debut: 1997 – Round 10, Penrith v Perth Reds at the WACA, 4 May
- Representative Debut: 1998 – Australia vs New Zealand, Suncorp Stadium, 9 October
- Premierships: 2003 – member of the Grand final winning Panthers team that defeated the Sydney Roosters, 18–6
