= Rangi Chase =

Māori and England international rugby league footballer

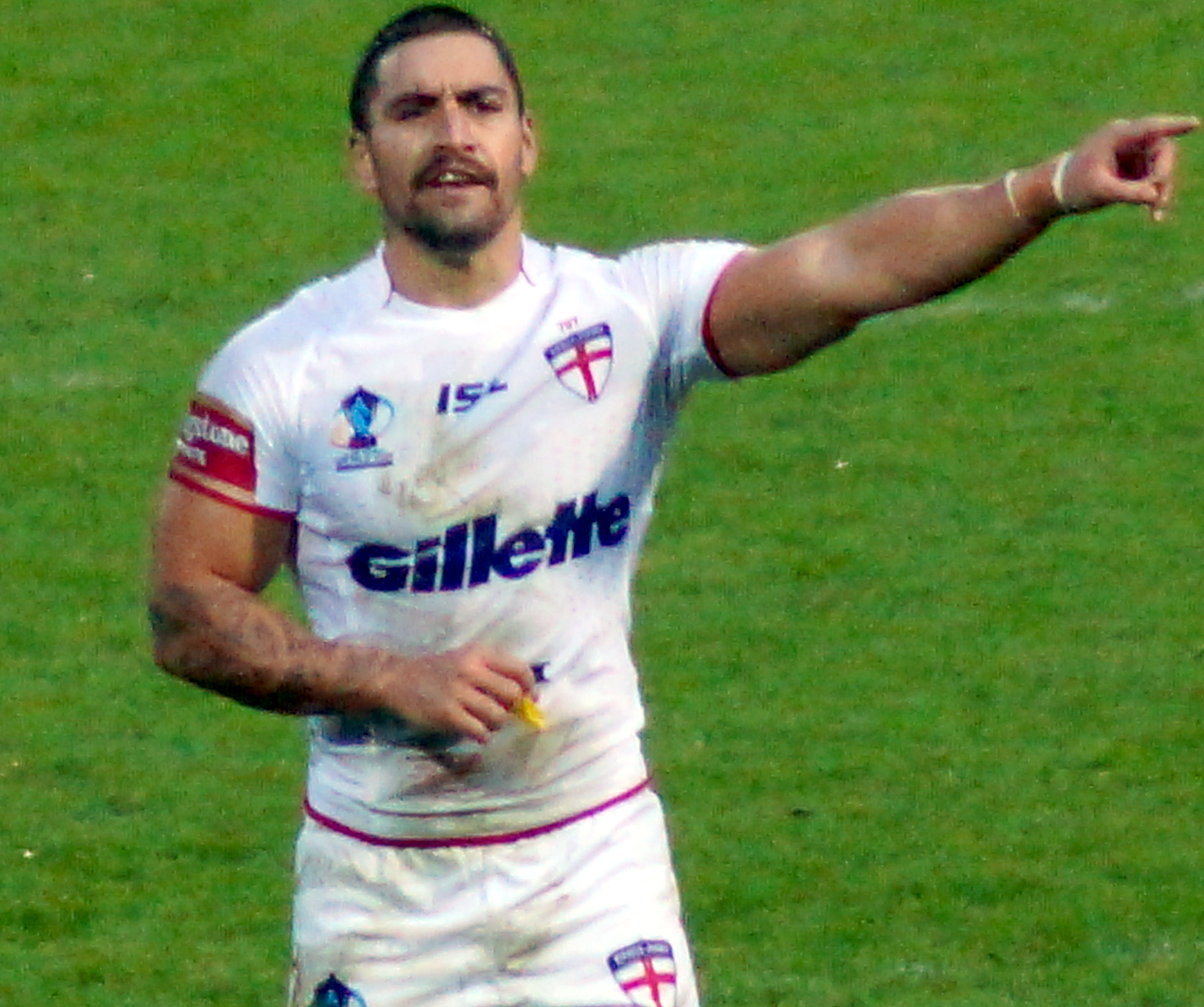

Personal information
- Full name: Moutoa Lance Chase
- Born: 11 April 1986 (age 40) Dannevirke, New Zealand
- Height: 5 ft 7 1/2 in (1.71 m)
- Weight: 13 st 12 lb (88 kg)

Playing information
- Position: Stand-off, Scrum-half
Club
Years	Team	Pld	T	G	FG	P
2006	Wests Tigers	1	1	0	0	4
2007–08	St George Illawarra	31	7	0	0	28
2009–14	Castleford Tigers	129	47	0	3	191
2014–15	Salford Red Devils	42	15	13	3	89
2016	Leigh Centurions	5	2	0	0	8
2016–17	Castleford Tigers	15	1	0	0	4
2017(loan)	→ Widnes Vikings	5	0	0	0	0
2017	Widnes Vikings	1	0	0	0	0
2019–20	Doncaster	11	3	0	0	12
2021	West Wales Raiders	4	1	0	0	4
2021–23	Rochdale Hornets	22	7	0	0	28
	Total	266	84	13	6	368
Representative
Years	Team	Pld	T	G	FG	P
2008–10	New Zealand Māori	2	1	0	0	4
2011	Exiles	1	0	0	0	0
2011–13	England	8	1	0	0	4
- Source: As of 21 March 2023

Moutoa Lance "Rangi" Chase (born 11 April 1986) is a rugby league footballer who last played for the Rochdale Hornets in RFL League 1.

He played at representative level for the New Zealand Māori before moving to Britain and playing for the Exiles, and then the England national team. Chase played in the National Rugby League for Australian clubs Wests Tigers and St. George Illawarra Dragons before playing in the Super League for English clubs Castleford Tigers and Salford Red Devils. Chase was the 2011 Albert Goldthorpe Medal winner and was selected in the England squad for the 2011 Gillette Four Nations. On 4 October 2011, Chase was presented with the Man of Steel Award whilst playing for Castleford Tigers. On 4 August 2017 it was announced that he had been suspended a result of a failed drug test from the previous month and on 23 November 2017 the UKAD confirmed a two-year ban from rugby. On 14 May 2019, it was announced Chase would return to rugby league with Doncaster until the end of the season.

== Background ==
Born in Dannevirke, New Zealand, Chase is of Māori descent and attended Te Aute College in Hawke's Bay, New Zealand, before moving to Australia where he attended Keebra Park State High School in Southport, Queensland. Chase begun his career with Manawatu in the 2002 North Island Super 6 competition.

== Playing career ==
=== National Rugby League ===
Chase started his career in the National Rugby League with Sydney team Wests Tigers, making his début in the 2006 NRL season. At the end of the year, he moved to the St. George Illawarra Dragons. He played there for two seasons.

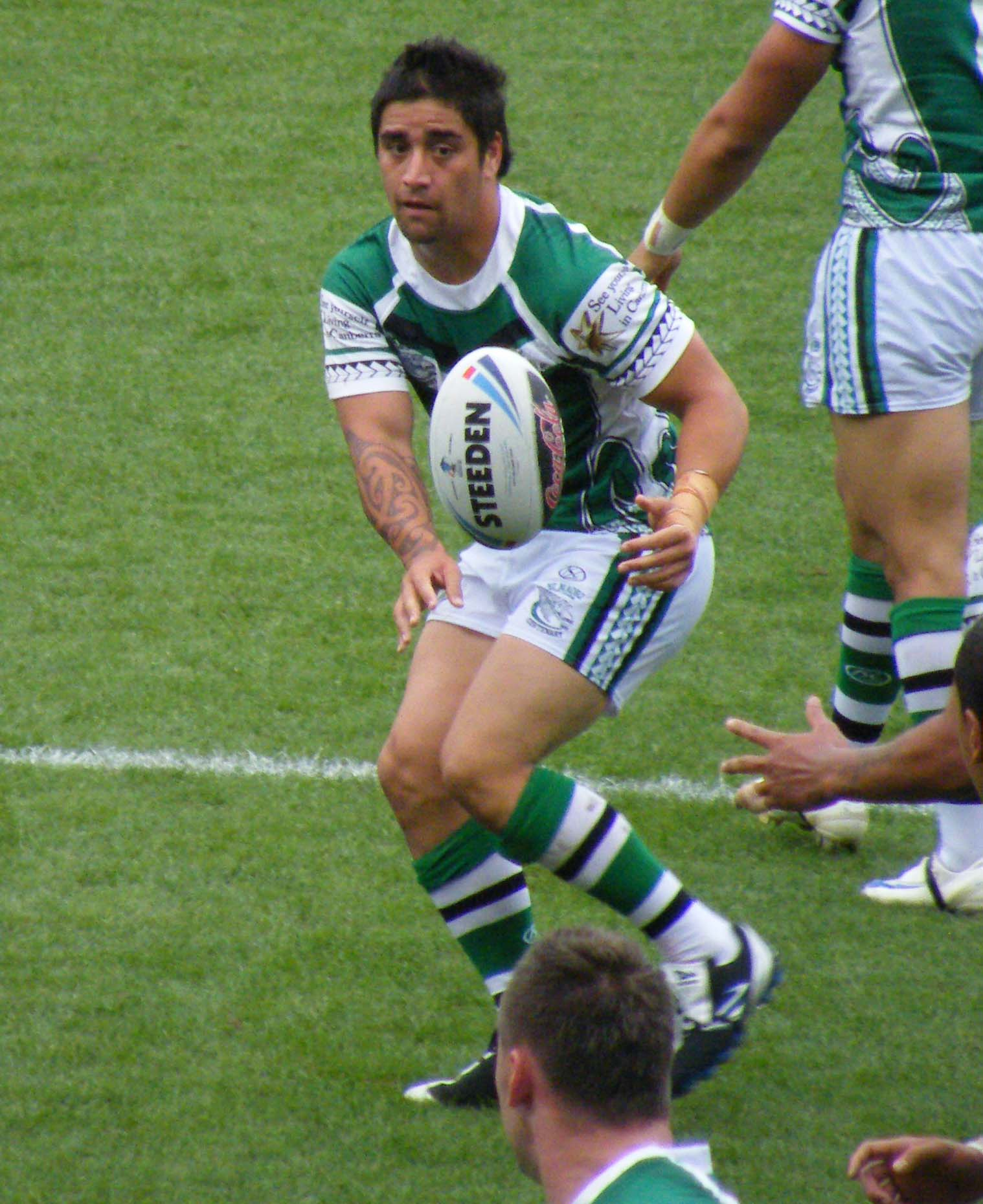
Chase playing for the New Zealand Māori in 2008

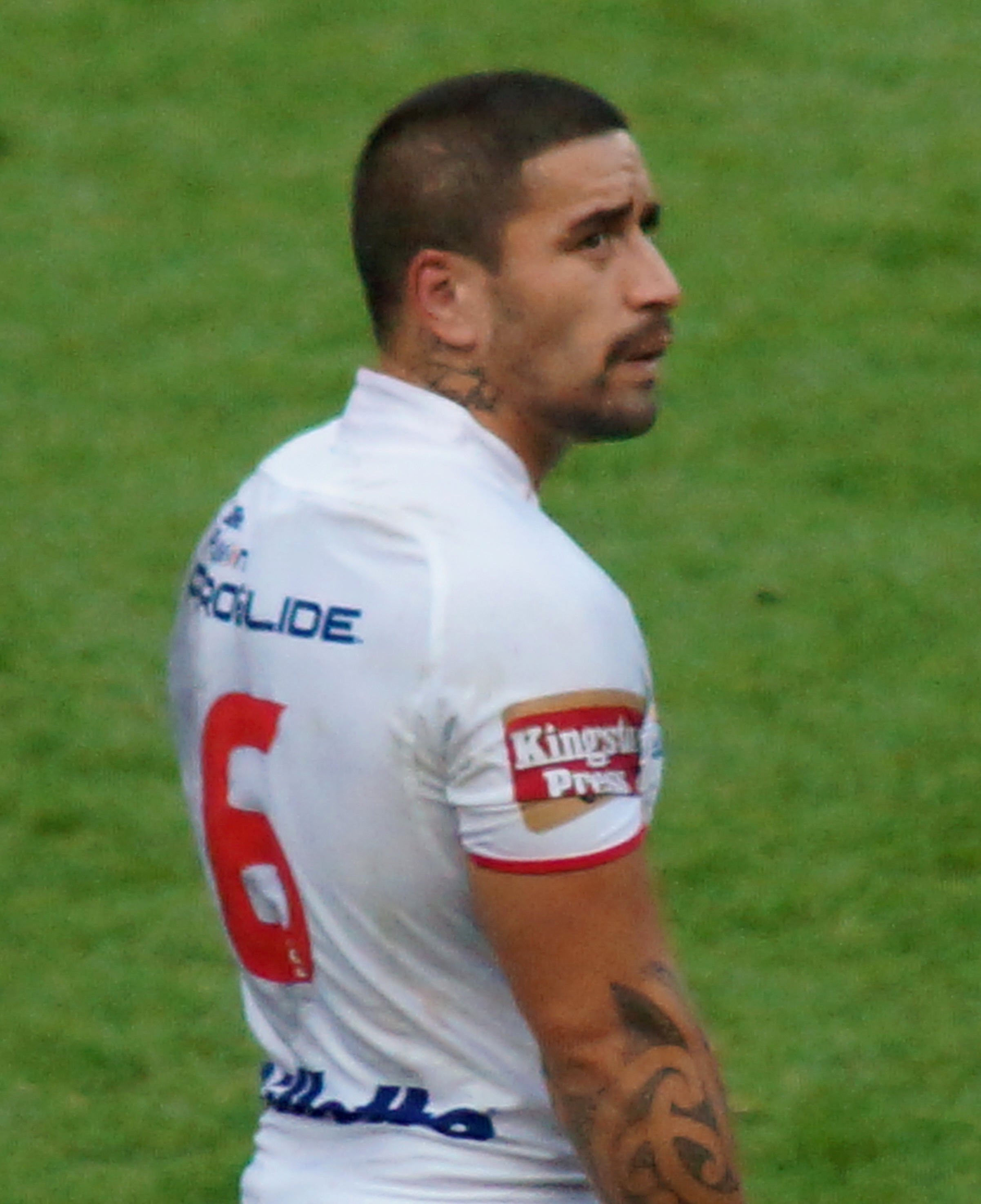
Chase playing for England in 2013

Chase was named for the New Zealand training squad for the 2008 Rugby League World Cup. Instead he played for the New Zealand Māori team.

=== Super League ===
Chase joined English club Castleford Tigers for 2009's Super League XIV, linking up in the halves with Brent Sherwin. Chase scored ten tries and made more tackle busts than any other player in Super League, earning him the Castleford Tigers player of the year award. In August 2009, Chase signed a four-year contract with the Tigers, lasting until the end of the 2013 season. He again played for the New Zealand Maori team in 2010.

In 2011, at Southport Magistrate's Court in Queensland, Australia Chase pleaded guilty to a charge of causing Grievous Bodily Harm and was sentenced to two years imprisonment, suspended.

Chase was selected to play against the Exiles in Game 1 of the International Origin, this was the first time a player has represented both teams in the Origin, after Chase received Man of the Match in the 2011 game for the Exiles. Chase was selected for the Exiles squad for the International Origin Match against England at Headingley on 10 June 2011, Being named man-of-the-match in the Exiles' victory. Despite this, on 3 October 2011, Chase made himself available for selection for the English national side. In 2011 he became the third consecutive Australasian import to win the Man of Steel award for Super League's player of the season.

He was selected by England despite having played against them earlier in the year, drawing criticism from former player Garry Schofield. Chase said that he asked to represent England as he found himself more "at home" in Castleford than New Zealand.

Chase made his début in the warm up test against France where he won the Man of the Match award. His next game was in the 42–4 win against Wales in the 2011 Four Nations. He also played against Australia at Wembley Stadium, against former schoolmate Benji Marshall, when England beat New Zealand 28–6. Chase's cousin Isaac Luke bent his leg back in a tackle in the win over New Zealand: Luke, who was put on report for the incident by referee Matt Cecchin, later apologised to Chase for the play. Chase was the scrum-half in the 30–8 loss to Australia in the 2011 Four Nations Final.

At the end of 2011 Chase was awarded the Albert Goldthorpe Medal. Chase was suspended indefinitely after an apparent breach of club discipline on the weekend of 24 June 2012. He also featured in the 2012 Autumn International Series Final against France.

On 11 February 2013, he was charged by the Super League after a high hit on England teammate Zak Hardaker against Leeds. He was given a two-game ban for a grade B offence. Chase signed for Salford in September 2013 for a sum believed to be in the region of £115,000 on a four-year deal. He made his début in an 18–14 win over the Wakefield Trinity Wildcats, but was injured and taken off after 17 minutes. Chase was part of England's 2013 Rugby League World Cup squad. He featured in the warm up against Italy which England lost 15–14. Chase was then selected at stand-off for the group games against Australia, Ireland and Fiji. He also featured in the Quarter Final against France. He scored a try against Ireland.

On 22 September 2015, controversy occurred as Chase, alongside teammates Harrison Hansen and Corey Paterson, had their Salford contracts terminated in order to free up salary cap space for the club to sign eight new players.

Chase signed for the then Championship club Leigh for the 2016 and 2017 seasons. Midway through the 2016 Championship season, Chase left the Leigh club to "pursue other options outside of Rugby League." It was later revealed he was battling depression.

On 1 July 2016, it was speculated via Sky Sports that Chase had re-signed with Castleford. This was confirmed the next day by the club and he will return for the remainder of the 2016 Super League season with the club option to extend the deal at the end of the season.

On 15 May 2017, it was confirmed that Chase had signed a season long loan deal with Super League Rivals, Widnes. The deal was made permanent, when Chase signed for the Widnes club on a two-year deal, signed on 7 July 2017 In August 2017, Chase was suspended by Widnes after failing a drugs test and on 23 November 2017 the UKAD confirmed a two-year ban from rugby.

=== West Wales Raiders ===
On 9 October 2020 it was reported that Chase had signed for the West Wales Raiders starting in the 2021.

=== Rochdale Hornets ===
On 21 June 2021 it was reported that he had signed for Rochdale in the RFL League 1
