= Richie Myler =

England and Ireland international rugby league footballer (born 1990)

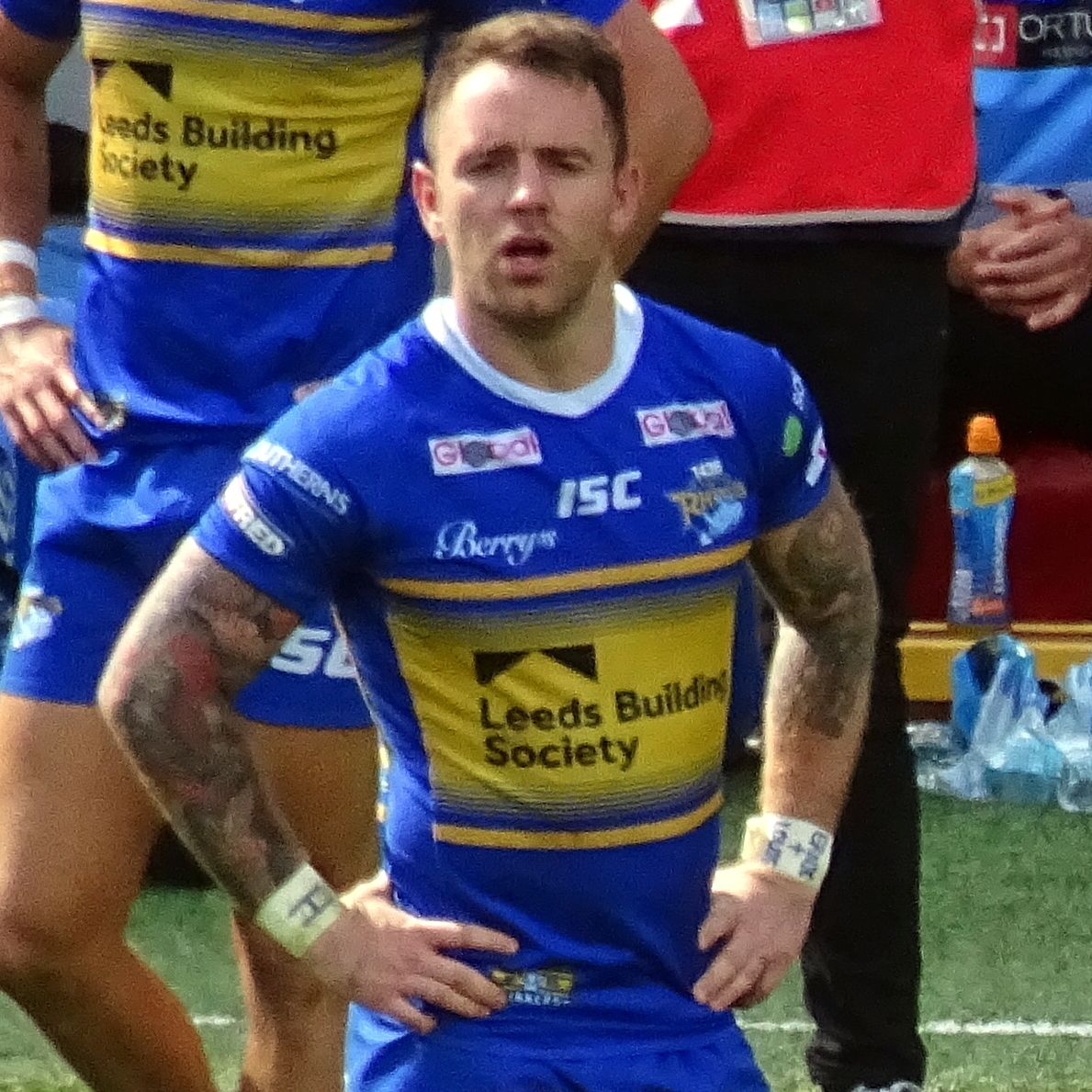

Personal information
- Full name: Richard David Myler
- Born: 21 May 1990 (age 36) Widnes, Cheshire, England

Playing information
- Height: 5 ft 11 in (1.80 m)
- Weight: 13 st 2 lb (83 kg)
- Position: Scrum-half, Fullback
Club
Years	Team	Pld	T	G	FG	P
2007	Widnes Vikings	2	0	0	0	0
2008–09	Salford City Reds	53	38	0	0	152
2010–15	Warrington Wolves	145	81	2	1	329
2016–17	Catalans Dragons	50	25	2	0	104
2018–23	Leeds Rhinos	134	52	6	2	222
2024	York Knights	3	2	0	0	8
	Total	387	198	10	3	815
Representative
Years	Team	Pld	T	G	FG	P
2008–18	England	8	8	9	0	50
2011	England Knights	1	1	0	0	4
2022	Ireland	3	0	0	0	0
- Spouse: Helen Skelton (m. 2013; sep. 2022)

Richard David Myler (born 21 May 1990) is a retired rugby league footballer, who is currently the director of rugby for Hull FC in the Super League. He is a member of the Ireland squad for the delayed 2021 Rugby League World Cup, having declared for Ireland in 2022. Previously he has represented England and the England Knights at international level.

He has played for the Widnes Vikings in the Championship, and the Salford City Reds in the Championship and the Super League. Myler has also played for the Warrington Wolves and the Catalans Dragons in the Super League.

== Early life ==
Myler was born in Widnes, Cheshire, England. He attended St's Peter and Paul RC High school. He was amongst several students to receive a scholarship from the Rugby League.

== Playing career ==
=== Club career ===
==== Widnes Vikings ====
Myler began his career with Widnes, playing two games in the 2007 season.

==== Salford: 2008–2009 ====
Myler signed for Salford from Widnes on a three-year deal in 2008 and contributed to Salford winning the National League One title, scoring 25 tries in 32 appearances, and winning numerous awards as well as the Co-Operative Player of the Year award. On 14 February 2009 Myler made his Super League début against Crusaders, scoring a try in a Salford victory.

==== Warrington: 2010–2015 ====
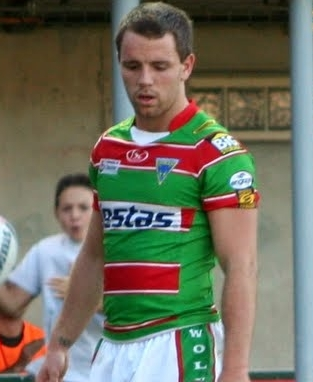
Myler playing for Warrington in 2010

In 2009, he signed a four-year contract with Warrington worth around £200,000, making him the most expensive teenage signing in Rugby League history. Myler was offered a new contract which allegedly would have made him the highest paid player in the history of Widnes. According to agent Martin Offiah he rejected the deal, instead favouring a four-year deal with Warrington.

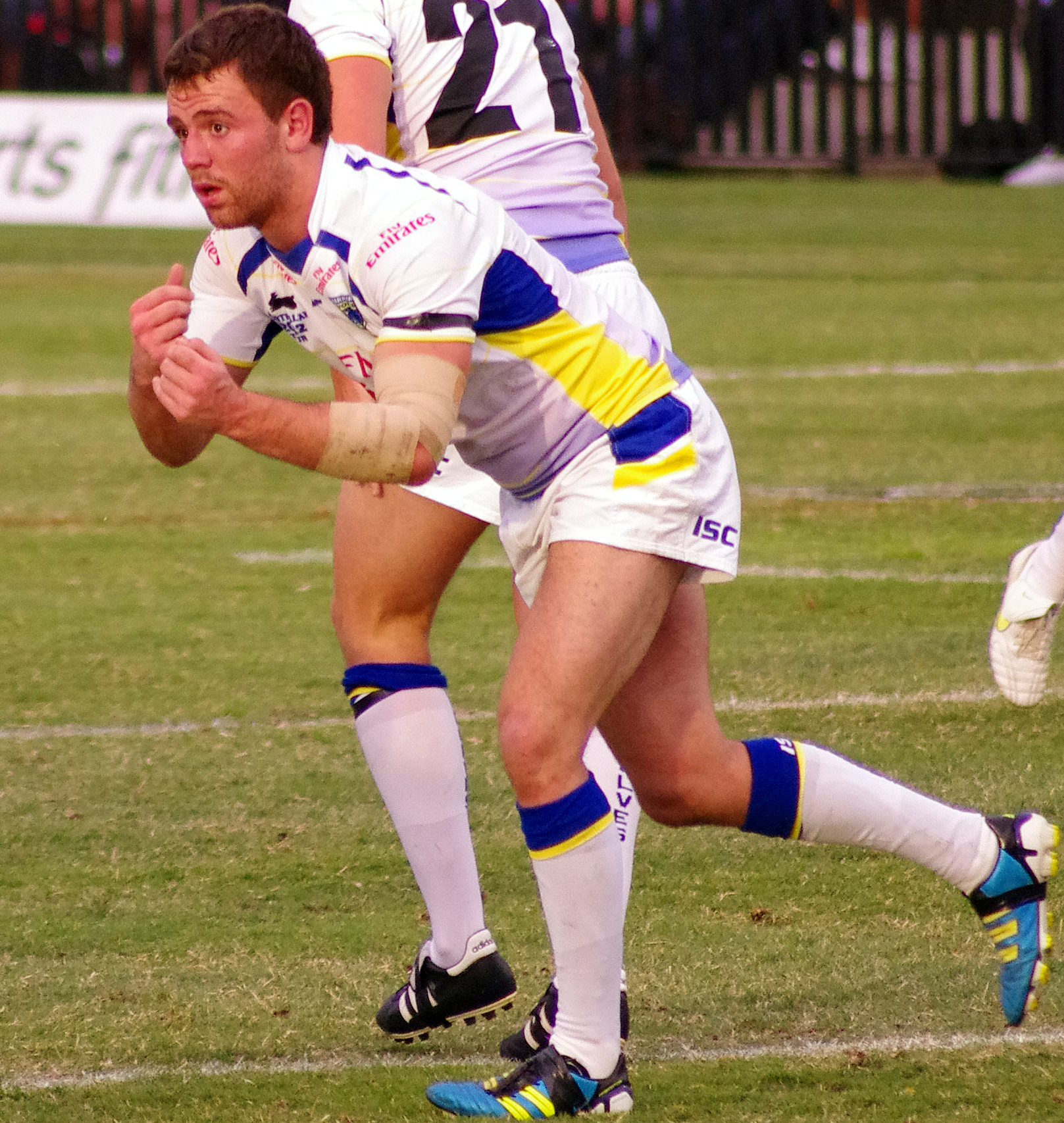
Myler playing for Warrington in 2012

He played in the 2012 Challenge Cup Final victory over the Leeds Rhinos at Wembley Stadium.

He played in the 2012 Super League Grand Final defeat by the Leeds Rhinos at Old Trafford.

He played in the 2013 Super League Grand Final defeat by the Wigan Warriors at Old Trafford.

==== Catalans Dragons ====
In 2015, he declared he was interested in playing the NRL the next year as he wanted a new challenge. Manly were rumoured to want Myler after the departure of halves pairing Kieran Foran and Daly Cherry-Evans. However, on 10 July 2015, it was confirmed that Myler would stay in the Super League, signing a two-year deal with Catalans Dragons from 2016.

==== Leeds Rhinos ====
On 27 June 2017 it was confirmed Myler had signed a three-year deal to join Leeds Rhinos starting from the following season. Myler was named Lance Todd Trophy winner for his performance at Fullback in the 2020 Challenge Cup Final. In round 21 of the 2022 Super League season, Myler scored a hat-trick in Leeds 36–32 victory over the Catalans Dragons. Leeds had been down 32–6 in the second half with one player being issued with a red card. In round 25 of the 2022 Super League season, Leeds defeated Huddersfield 18–14 in controversial circumstances. With less than five minutes to play, Myler was caught in a tackle with Huddersfield's Chris Hill.The referee issued a yellow card to Hill over the incident which moments later eventuated in Leeds scoring the winning try. On 24 September 2022, Myler played for Leeds in their 24–12 loss to St Helens RFC in the 2022 Super League Grand Final. Myler played a total of 19 games for Leeds in the 2023 Super League season as the club finished 8th on the table and missed the playoffs.

=== York Knights ===
On 6 November 2023, it was reported that he had signed for York Knights in the RFL Championship on a one-year deal. On 3 March 2024, Myler made his 400th career appearance in York's 1895 Cup quarter-final match against Oldham. In April, Myler announced his retirement following an elbow injury sustained in a match against Doncaster the previous month.

=== International career ===
==== England ====
Myler has represented both the Lancashire and England U-17s at Academy Level.

He was named in the England training squad for the 2008 Rugby League World Cup. He was named in the England team to face Wales at the Keepmoat Stadium, Doncaster prior to England's departure for the 2008 Rugby League World Cup. He made his England début in the victory over Wales on 10 October 2008.

Myler represented England against France on 13 June 2009. He started the game as a scrum-half and scored 30 points in the 66–12 England victory.

Myler was not called up to the England RL side for the Four Nations in 2011, however he was selected in the England Knights where he put in two man of the match performances but was still not called up.

Myler was recalled to the international stage in 2018, playing in test matches against France at the Leigh Sports Village and New Zealand.

==== Ireland ====
In August 2022 Myler declared that he was available to play for Ireland in the forthcoming World Cup. He is qualified to play for Ireland through one of his grandfathers. Myler was named in the Ireland squad for the tournament when it was announced on 29 September 2022.

== Personal life ==
In March 2012 Myler became engaged to then Blue Peter presenter Helen Skelton. They married in December 2013, and Skelton gave birth to their first child, a boy named Ernie, on 19 June 2015. followed by their second son, Louis, in April 2017. The couple's daughter, Elsie Kate, was born on 28 December 2021. Skelton announced on 25 April 2022 that the couple had separated.

It was later revealed on 6 March 2023 on Instagram that his new girlfriend, heiress, Stephanie Thirkill, was pregnant with their first child, who was born a month later.
