= Willie Manu =

Tonga international rugby league footballer

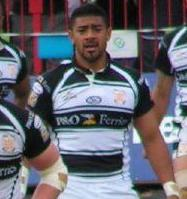

Personal information
- Full name: Viliami Makamaile Manu
- Born: 20 March 1980 (age 46) Hornsby, New South Wales, Australia

Playing information
- Height: 179 cm (5 ft 10 in)
- Weight: 109 kg (17 st 2 lb)
- Position: Second-row, Lock
Club
Years	Team	Pld	T	G	FG	P
2001–03	Wests Tigers	50	5	0	0	20
2004	South Sydney	19	0	0	0	0
2005	St. George Illawarra	14	1	0	0	4
2006	Castleford Tigers	24	9	0	0	36
2007–12	Hull FC	165	36	0	0	144
2013–14	St Helens	47	9	0	0	36
2015	Sydney Roosters	4	0	0	0	0
	Total	323	60	0	0	240
Representative
Years	Team	Pld	T	G	FG	P
2000–13	Tonga	11	2	0	0	8
2011–13	Exiles	3	1	0	0	4

Viliami Makamaile "Willie" Manu (born 20 March 1980) is a former Tonga international rugby league footballer. He played as a second-row forward, he previously played in the National Rugby League for Australian clubs the Wests Tigers, South Sydney Rabbitohs, St. George Illawarra Dragons and the Sydney Roosters. Manu moved to England and played in the Super League for the Castleford Tigers, Hull F.C. before joining St Helens, with whom he won the 2014 Super League championship.

== Background ==
Manu was born in Hornsby, New South Wales, Australia.

== Playing career ==
In August 2008, Willie Manu was named in the Tonga training squad for the 2008 Rugby League World Cup, and in October 2008 he was named in the final 24-man Tonga squad. He played for Tonga in 2009 in a Test match against the New Zealand national rugby league team.

St. Helens reached the 2014 Super League Grand Final and Manu was selected to play from the interchange bench in their 14–6 victory over the Wigan Warriors at Old Trafford.

== Controversy ==
In July 2005, Manu was granted continuing bail in Wollongong Local Court on charges related to an altercation at a Wollongong nightclub. Manu was charged with maliciously inflicting grievous bodily harm and affray. A nightclub employee suffered head injuries in the incident, while another man received a serious cut to his head.
