= Daniel Anderson (rugby league) =

Australian rugby league coach

Personal information
- Full name: Daniel Stewart Anderson
- Born: 3 May 1967 (age 59) Australia

Coaching information
Club
Years	Team	Gms	W	D	L	W%
2001–04	New Zealand Warriors	92	51	2	39	55
2005–08	St Helens	118	94	1	23	80
2009–10	Parramatta Eels	52	25	1	26	48
	Total	262	170	4	88	65
Representative
Years	Team	Gms	W	D	L	W%
2004–05	New Zealand	8	1	1	6	13
2012	Exiles	2	1	0	1	50
- Source: As of 27 September 2009

Daniel Stewart Anderson (born 3 May 1967) is an Australian professional rugby league coach. Anderson previously coached the New Zealand Warriors and the Parramatta Eels in the NRL and St. Helens in the Super League. He has also coached New Zealand and the Exiles at representative level.

== Early years ==
Anderson began his coaching career in 1999 at the Parramatta Eels working his way up to Premier League coach before being made assistant coach to Brian Smith in 2000.

== New Zealand Warriors ==
In 2001, Anderson was a surprise choice for coach of the New Zealand Warriors. He had amazing success, taking them to their first finals series in 2001 and their first Grand Final in 2002, losing to the Sydney Roosters. The 2002 Dally M Coach of the Year was awarded to Anderson. He took the Warriors to another Finals series in 2003, the same year he replaced Gary Freeman as head coach of the New Zealand national rugby league team.

Anderson resigned from the Warriors in June 2004 after a bad start to the season; winning only three out of eleven games. Anderson retained his position as coach of the New Zealand Kiwis until June 2005.

== St Helens ==
He was appointed the coach of St Helens R.F.C. in 2005, succeeding the previous coach Ian Millward who had been sacked by the club. He left the position at the end of 2008's Super League XIII, returning to Australia.

In August 2006, St Helens won the Rugby League Challenge Cup after beating Huddersfield Giants 42–12 at Twickenham in the final. The club then went on to win the 2006 Grand Final.

In December 2006, Anderson was rewarded for St Helens' dominance throughout the season when he won the BBC Coach of the Year Award. This was the first time a rugby league coach had received the award. He was also named Super League's coach of the year in 2006 and again in 2007.

In February 2007, Anderson won the World Club Challenge with St. Helens, defeating Australian champions, the Brisbane Broncos.

He then went on to coach St Helens to win the 2007 Challenge Cup final, defeating the Catalans Dragons 30–8 at the new Wembley Stadium.

St. Helens made it to 2007's Super League XII Grand Final at Old Trafford against the Leeds Rhinos, but they lost 33–6.

In August 2008 Anderson won the Rugby League Challenge Cup with St Helens for a third successive year beating Hull FC 28–16 at Wembley Stadium.

He is the brother-in-law of former Hull Kingston Rovers coach Justin Morgan.

He coached St Helens in their loss to the Leeds Rhinos in 2008's Super League XIII Grand Final.

== Parramatta Eels ==
On 17 November 2008, Anderson was announced the head coach of the Parramatta Eels NRL squad for three years, beginning in 2009. He guided the Eels to a remarkable 2009 National Rugby League Grand Final from a position where after 18 rounds the Eels were tipped 150/1 to win the NRL. On 25 September 2010, it was announced that Anderson's contract had been terminated with immediate effect by the club, who replaced him with Stephen Kearney.

On 18 October 2013, it was announced that Anderson would leave his post as NRL Referees elite performance manager to return to Parramatta in the newly created job as general manager of football operations.

In 2014, a report revealed that a review was conducted in order to determine whether Anderson should have been granted a contract extension as head coach back in 2011. Anderson "had suggested his position would be untenable for the 2011 season and the level of undermining and the resultant instability would make his job impossible", the report read. "He was very disappointed and it was going to be a long year for all. He claimed his staff were ‘not on his bus’ and that it was a toxic environment". The report also alleged that players had turned up to recovery sessions intoxicated or smelling of alcohol and that "he also struggled to handle relationships that longer serving staff and players had with the board."

In 2016, Anderson along with four other board members were de-registered by The NRL and had their contracts terminated by Parramatta in the wake of the club's salary cap scandal. It was alleged that Anderson along with the other board members which the media dubbed "The gang of five" had been aware of or made payments to players outside of the game's rules. If found guilty of this, Anderson could face a maximum sentence of 10 years in jail for fraud.

== Sydney Roosters ==
On 30 January 2019, it was revealed that Anderson had joined the Sydney Roosters in a recruitment role. Before Anderson was allowed to join the club, the Eastern Suburbs outfit had to convince the NRL that he was a fit and proper person befitting registration. An NRL spokesman said Anderson had been approved to join Easts with some restrictions on his role after two years out of the game.

== St George Illawarra Dragons ==
On Monday 28th July 2025, Anderson was appointed as the St George Illawarra Dragons Head of Recruitment and Pathways.

== Personal life ==
On 31 December 2022, it was reported that Anderson had been rushed to hospital following a surfing accident in the Central Coast area of New South Wales. The Sydney Morning Herald also reported that Anderson was on a ventilator and had been kept under supervision at Sydney's Royal North Shore Hospital. Anderson experienced severe compression of his spinal cord in the accident, and, as of 28 May 2023, was an incomplete quadriplegic. He has limited mobility in much of his body, with the outlook for further improvement unclear. On August 18, 2023, Go Media Mt Smart Stadium was named in his honour as a fundraiser for One NZ Warriors' final home game of the 2023 NRL regular season against Manly Sea Eagles.

== Honours ==
Dally M Coach of the Year 2002

NRL Grand Finalist 2002, 2009

Challenge Cup Winner 2006, 2007, 2008

Super League Grand Final Winner 2006

BBC Coach of the Year 2006

World Club Challenge Winner 2007
