= 2005 Warrington Wolves season =

English rugby league team season

Warrington Wolves 2005 season
- Super League X Rank: 4th
- Play-off result: Elimination play-offs
- Challenge Cup: Round 4
- 2005 record: Wins: 18; draws: 0; losses: 11
- Points scored: For: 792; against: 702

Team information
- Chairman: Doug Hoyle
- Head Coach: Paul Cullen
- Captain: Lee Briers
- Stadium: Halliwell Jones Stadium
- Avg. attendance: 11,003
- High attendance: 13,024; Leeds Rhinos, 12 September
- Low attendance: 9,040; Huddersfield Giants, 20 March

Top scorers
- Tries: Henry Fa'afili (23)
- Goals: Chris Bridge (57)
- Points: Chris Bridge (147)
← 2004	List of seasons	2006 →

The 2005 season was the Warrington Wolves' 20th consecutive season playing in England's top division of rugby league. During the season, they competed in Super League X and the 2005 Challenge Cup.

== Preseason friendlies ==
Date and time	Versus	H/A	Venue	Result	Score	Tries	Goals	Attendance	Report
26 December 2004; 15:00	Widnes Vikings	A	Halton Stadium	L	6–12	Westwood	Hull (1/1)	6,957	
2 January; 15:00	Barrow Raiders	H	Halliwell Jones Stadium	W	66–6	Clarke (2), Lima (2), Gaskell, Grose, Ashall, Kohe-Love, Riley	Hull (2/?), Ashall (6/?)	Unknown	
16 January; 15:00	Whitehaven Warriors	H	Halliwell Jones Stadium	W	32–16	Clarke (3), Westwood, Berry, Lima	Briers (4/6)	2,816	
30 January; 15:00 (Note: Proceeds of match were donated to former player and Wigan Warriors coach Mike Gregory, who was suffering from progressive muscular atrophy.)	Salford City Reds	H	Halliwell Jones Stadium	W	26–24	Grose (2), Bracek, Fa'afili	(Note: Conversions or penalties not recorded.)	4,323	

== Super League ==
Warrington's 2005 season was marked by the landmark short-term signing on 31 July of Newcastle Knights scrum half Andrew Johns, considered at the time to be the greatest rugby league player in the world, for the last two rounds of the season and for any forthcoming play-off fixture. Johns, who made his Super League debut against the Leeds Rhinos on 12 September at home to a sold-out Halliwell Jones Stadium, was signed by Warrington with the intention for the club to make it through to the Super League Grand Final for the first time in the club's history. Warrington ultimately lost at home to Hull F.C. in the elimination play-offs, triggering Johns' return to Australia.

=== Fixtures ===
Warrington Wolves' 2005 Super League fixtures were released on 2 December 2004, with seven being televised live on Sky Sports:

Date and time	Round	Versus	H/A	Venue	Result	Score	Tries	Goals	Attendance	TV	Pos.	Report
13 February; 15:00	Round 1	London Broncos	A	Griffin Park	L	24–28	Mn. Gleeson (2), Hilton, N. Wood, Westwood	Briers (2/5)	4,179	Not televised	9th	
20 February; 15:00	Round 2	Leigh Centurions	H	Halliwell Jones Stadium	W	26–22	Clarke (2), Mn. Gleeson, N. Wood, Briers	Briers (3/5)	11,412	Not televised	9th	
27 February; 15:15	Round 3	Hull F.C.	A	KC Stadium	L	10–32	Briers, Fa'afili	Briers (1/2)	10,169	Not televised	6th	
4 March; 20:00	Round 4	St Helens	H	Halliwell Jones Stadium	L	16–18	Fa'afili, Appo	Briers (2/2 + 2 pen.)	12,098	Sky Sports 1	10th	
11 March; 20:00	Round 5	Leeds Rhinos	A	Headingley Rugby Stadium	L	6–38	Mn. Gleeson	Briers (1/1)	15,637	Not televised	10th	
20 March; 20:00	Round 6	Huddersfield Giants	H	Halliwell Jones Stadium	W	14–6	Kohe-Love, Grose	Briers (2/2 + 1 pen.)	9,040	Not televised	10th	
25 March; 15:00	Round 7	Salford City Reds	A	The Willows	L	10–42	Fa'afili, Bridge	Briers (1/2)	6,004	Not televised	10th	
29 March; 20:00	Round 8	Widnes Vikings	H	Halliwell Jones Stadium	W	44–12	Clarke (3), Fa'afili (2), Wainwright, Westwood, Mn. Gleeson, Briers	Briers (1/6 + 1 pen.), Bridge (2/3)	10,061	Sky Sports 2	10th	
10 April; 15:00	Round 9	Bradford Bulls	H	Halliwell Jones Stadium	W	35–32	Grose (2), Mn. Gleeson (2), N. Wood, Fa'afili	Briers (4/6 + 1 pen.); Drop Goals Briers	10,654	Not televised	9th	
17 April; 15:30	Round 10	Wakefield Trinity Wildcats	A	Belle Vue	W	40–28	Westwood (2), Briers (2), Wainwright, N. Wood, Clarke, Fa'afili	Briers (3/7), Bridge (1/1)	5,129	Not televised	9th	
24 April; 15:00	Round 11	Hull F.C.	H	Halliwell Jones Stadium	W	36–34	Fa'afili (3), Appo (2), Grose, Westwood	Appo (1/4), Bridge (3/3)	10,383	Not televised	7th	
29 April; 20:00	Round 12	St Helens	A	Knowsley Road	L	30–31	N. Wood (2) Kohe-Love, Westwood, Fa'afili	Appo (5/5)	12,666	Sky Sports 3	6th	
15 May; 15:00	Round 13	Wigan Warriors	H	Halliwell Jones Stadium	W	28–22	Lima (2), Wainwright, Swann, N. Wood	Bridge (4/5)	12,790	Not televised	6th	
22 May; 15:00	Round 14	Bradford Bulls	A	Odsal Stadium	W	44–24	Bridge (2), Noone, Kohe-Love, P. Wood, Lima, Fa'afili	Bridge (7/7 + 1 pen.)	14,428	Not televised	5th	
29 May; 15:00	Round 15	Wakefield Trinity Wildcats	H	Halliwell Jones Stadium	W	38–30	Swann (2), N. Wood (2), Mn. Gleeson, Fa'afili, Grose	Bridge (4/7 + 1 pen.)	10,113	Not televised	4th	
5 June; 15:00	Round 16	Huddersfield Giants	A	Kirklees Stadium	W	24–22	Clarke, Fa'afili, Westwood, Bridge	Bridge (3/4 + 1 pen.)	6,162	Not televised	3rd	
12 June; 15:00	Round 17	Leigh Centurions	A	Hilton Park	W	42–7	Fa'afili (2), Westwood, Grose, N. Wood, Clarke, Bridge, Appo	Bridge (5/8)	7,249	Not televised	5th	
19 June; 15:00	Round 18	Salford City Reds	H	Halliwell Jones Stadium	W	48–14	Westwood (3), Swann (2), Kohe-Love (2), Mn. Gleeson (2)	Bridge (4/6), Briers (2/3)	10,925	Not televised	4th	
3 July; 15:00	Round 19	Widnes Vikings	A	Halton Stadium	W	25–24	Clarke, Mn. Gleeson, Lima, N. Wood, Appo	Noone (2/5); Drop Goals Briers	9,825	Not televised	3rd	
9 July; 18:05	Round 20	Wigan Warriors	A	JJB Stadium	L	17–36	Grose, Kohe-Love, Bridge	Bridge (2/3); Drop Goals Bridge	14,162	Sky Sports 1	3rd	
17 July; 15:00	Round 21	London Broncos	H	Halliwell Jones Stadium	W	26–14	Fa'afili (2), Mn. Gleeson, Gaskell, Grose	Bridge (3/5)	10,146	Not televised	4th	
23 July; 18:05	Round 22	Leeds Rhinos	H	Halliwell Jones Stadium	L	22–46	Fa'afili (2), Grose, Swann	Appo (1/3 + 1 pen.), Briers (1/1)	11,036	Sky Sports 3	3rd	
7 August; 15;00	Round 23	St Helens	H	Halliwell Jones Stadium	L	10–30	Mn. Gleeson, P. Wood	Bridge (1/2)	12,762	Not televised	4th	
14 August; 15:00	Round 24	Huddersfield Giants	A	Kirklees Stadium	L	22–38	Mn. Gleeson, Swann, N. Wood, Bridge	Bridge (3/4)	4,077	Not televised	4th	
21 August; 15:00	Round 25	Widnes Vikings	A	Halton Stadium	W	60–16	Kohe-Love (2), N. Wood, Westwood, Lima, Mk. Gleeson, Grose, Fa'afili, Mn. Gleeson, P. Wood, Riley	Bridge (8/11)	7,878	Not televised	5th	
4 September; 15:00	Round 26	Salford City Reds	H	Halliwell Jones Stadium	W	32–22	Westwood, N. Wood, Mn. Gleeson, Bridge, Briers, Leikvoll	Bridge (4/6)	9,169	Not televised	5th	
12 September; 18:00	Round 27	Leeds Rhinos	H	Halliwell Jones Stadium	W	33–16	Fa'afili, Mn. Gleeson, Grose, Swann, N. Wood	Johns (5/6 + 1 pen.); Drop Goals Johns	13,024	Sky Sports 1	4th	
16 September; 20:00	Round 28	Hull F.C.	A	KC Stadium	W	30–16	Swann (2), Kohe-Love (2), Grose	Johns (5/5)	15,763	Sky Sports 2	4th	

=== Table ===
Pos	Team	Pld	W	D	L	PF	PA	PD	Pts	Qualification
1	St Helens (L)	28	23	1	4	1028	537	+491	47	Semi Final
2	Leeds Rhinos	28	22	0	6	1152	505	+647	44	Semi Final
3	Bradford Bulls (C)	28	18	1	9	1038	684	+354	37	Elimination Semi Final
4	Warrington Wolves	28	18	0	10	792	702	+90	36	Elimination Semi Final
5	Hull F.C.	28	15	2	11	756	670	+86	32	Elimination Semi Final
6	London Broncos	28	13	2	13	800	718	+82	28	Elimination Semi Final
7	Wigan Warriors	28	14	0	14	698	718	−20	28	
8	Huddersfield Giants	28	12	0	16	742	791	−49	24	
9	Salford City Reds	28	11	0	17	549	732	−183	22	
10	Wakefield Trinity Wildcats	28	10	0	18	716	999	−283	20	
11	Widnes Vikings (R)	28	6	1	21	598	1048	−450	13	Relegation to National League One
12	Leigh Centurions (R)	28	2	1	25	445	1210	−765	5	Relegation to National League One

Source: Rugby League Project
Rules for classification: 1) Points; 2) Points difference; 3) Number of points scored;
(C) Champions; (L) League Leaders' Shield Winners; (R) Relegated

=== Play-offs ===
Date and time	Round	Versus	H/A	Venue	Result	Score	Tries	Goals	Attendance	TV	Report
24 September; 18:05	Elimination playoffs	Hull F.C.	H	Halliwell Jones Stadium	L	6–40	Johns	Johns (1/1)	12,243	Sky Sports 1	

== Challenge Cup ==
Date and time	Round	Versus	H/A	Venue	Result	Score	Tries	Goals	Attendance	TV	Report
2 April; 14:35	Round 4	Leeds Rhinos	A	Headingley Rugby Stadium	L	22–26	N. Wood (2), Clarke, Westwood	Bridge (3/4)	8,215	BBC Two	

== Transfers ==
=== Gains ===
Player	Club	Contract	Date
(England) Martin Gleeson	St Helens	4 years	July 2004
(New Zealand) Toa Kohe-Love	Bradford Bulls	1 year	September 2004
(New Zealand) Logan Swann	Bradford Bulls	2 years	September 2004
(Ireland) Simon Grix	Halifax R.L.F.C.	2 years	September 2004
(Wales) Andy Bracek	St Helens	2 years	November 2004
(England) Nick Royle (Note: Royle did not make a single first-team appearance during the 2005 season, following no appearances with Widnes in 2004.)	Widnes Vikings	1 year	2005
(England) Chris Bridge	Bradford Bulls	3 years	January 2005

==== Loans in ====
Player	Club	Loan period	Date
(Australia) Andrew Johns	Newcastle Knights	End of season	July 2005
(Ireland) Scott Grix	XIII Limouxin	One month	August 2005

=== Losses ===
Player	Club	Contract	Date
(Australia) Darren Burns	N/A	Retirement	September 2004
(England) Mike Forshaw	N/A	Retirement	September 2004
(France) Jérôme Guisset	CA Brive (Note: Guisset switched back to rugby league by signing with Wigan Warriors in February 2005 after an unsuccessful season with Brive.)		September 2004
(England) Ian Sibbit	Salford City Reds	2 years	September 2004
(England) Richard Varkulis	Rochdale Hornets		November 2004
(Papua New Guinea) John Wilshere	Leigh Centurions	1 year	December 2004
(England) Gary Hulse	Widnes Vikings		2005
(England) Nick Owen	Leigh Centurions		2005

== Squad ==
2005 Warrington Wolves squad
First team squad			Coaching staff
1 (Australia) Brent Grose – FB; 2 (New Zealand) Henry Fa'afili – WG; 3 (England) Martin Gleeson – CE; 4 (New Zealand) Toa Kohe-Love – WG; 5 (Ireland) Dean Gaskell – WG; 6 (Wales) Lee Briers (c) – SH (gk); 7 (Australia) Nathan Wood – SH; 8 (Australia) Chris Leikvoll – PR; 9 (England) Jon Clarke – HK; 10 (England) Mark Hilton – PR; 11 (New Zealand) Logan Swann – SR	12 (Scotland) Mike Wainwright – SR; 13 (England) Paul Noone – SR, LF; 14 (England) Mark Gleeson – HK; 15 (England) Ben Westwood – CE; 16 (England) Paul Wood – SR, LF; 17 (Samoa) Danny Lima – PR; 18 (Australia) Graham Appo – SO (gk); 19 (England) Darryl Cardiss – FB; 20 (England) Warren Stevens – SR, PR; 21 (Ireland) Simon Grix – LF; 22 (England) Steve Pickersgill – SR	23 (Wales) Andy Bracek – WG, CE; 24 (England) Phil Berry – WG; 25 (England) Chris Bridge – SO, CE (gk); 28 (England) Chris Riley – WG; 31 (Australia) Andrew Johns – SH (gk)	Head coach: (England) Paul Cullen; Assistant coach: (England) Paul Darbyshire; Legend: (c) Captain(s); (vc) Vice-captain(s); (red card) = suspended; = injured; (gk) = Goal kicker; Updated: 12 March 2005; Source(s): First team profiles, Club info
