= 2008 Rugby League World Cup Group C =

Group C of the 2008 Rugby League World Cup was one of the three groups of teams that competed in the 2008 Rugby League World Cup tournament's group stage. Group C consisted of three teams: Ireland, Tonga and Samoa. After all teams played had each other once, only Ireland advanced to 2008 Rugby League World Cup knockout stage.

== Standings ==
In the knockout stage Ireland played in the qualifying final while Tonga and Samoa played for 7th and 9th place respectively.

Pos	Team	Pld	W	D	L	PF	PA	PD	Pts	Qualification
1	Ireland	2	1	0	1	54	38	+16	2	Advance to knockout stage
2	Tonga	2	1	0	1	34	40	−6	2	
3	Samoa	2	1	0	1	36	46	−10	2	

== Matches ==
=== Tonga vs Ireland ===
27 October 2008
18:55 ADST (UTC+11:00)

Tonga	22–20	Ireland
Tries: Michael Jennings 10' c Cooper Vuna 36' m Etuate Uaisele 59' c Esikeli Tonga 74' m Goals: Joel Taufa'ao (2); Tony Williams (1)	Report	Tries: Damien Blanch 26' m, 51' m, 67' c Michael Platt 30' c Goals: Pat Richards (2)

Parramatta Stadium, Sydney
Attendance: 6,165
Referee: Steve Ganson (England)

Tonga	Ireland

FB	1	Fetuli Talanoa
RW	2	Cooper Vuna
RC	3	Michael Jennings
LC	4	Etu Uaisele
LW	5	Esikeli Tonga
FE	6	Feleti Mateo
HB	7	Joel Taufa'ao
PR	8	Antonio Kaufusi
HK	9	Tevita Leo-Latu
PR	10	Manase Manuokafoa
SR	11	Lopini Paea (c)
SR	12	Richard Fa'aoso
LK	13	Willie Manu
Substitutions:
IC	14	Sam Moa
IC	15	Epalahame Lauaki
IC	16	Kim Uasi
IC	17	Tony Williams
Coach:
(Australia) Jim Dymock

FB	1	Michael Platt
RW	2	Damien Blanch
RC	3	Sean Gleeson
LC	4	Stuart Littler
LW	5	Pat Richards
SO	6	Scott Grix (c)
SH	7	Karl Fitzpatrick
PR	8	Eamon O'Carroll
HK	9	Bob Beswick
PR	10	Ryan Tandy
SR	11	Ben Harrison
SR	12	Lee Doran
LF	13	Simon Finnigan
Substitutions:
IC	14	Michael McIlorum
IC	15	Liam Finn
IC	16	Gareth Haggerty
IC	17	Mick Cassidy
Coach:
(England) Andy Kelly

=== Samoa vs Tonga ===
31 October 2008
18:55 ADST (UTC+11:00)

Samoa	20–12	Tonga
Tries: Francis Meli; Nigel Vagana; Matt Utai; George Carmont; Goals: Ben Roberts (2)	Report	Tries: Michael Jennings; Tevita Leo-Latu Goals: Tony Williams (2)

Penrith Stadium, Sydney
Attendance: 11,787
Referee: Shayne Hayne (Australia)

Samoa	Tonga

FB	1	Smith Samau
RW	2	Matt Utai
RC	3	Willie Talau
LC	4	George Carmont
LW	5	Francis Meli
FE	6	Nigel Vagana (c)
HB	7	Ben Roberts
PR	8	Kylie Leuluai
HK	9	Terrence Seu Seu
PR	10	Tony Puletua
SR	11	Lagi Setu
SR	12	David Solomona
LK	13	Harrison Hansen
Substitutions:
IC	14	Frank Puletua
IC	15	Ali Lauitiiti
IC	16	Joseph Paulo
IC	17	Alby Talipeau
Coach:
(New Zealand) John Ackland

FB	3	Michael Jennings
RW	2	Cooper Vuna
RC	1	Fetuli Talanoa
LC	4	Etu Uaisele
LW	5	Esikeli Tonga
FE	6	Feleti Mateo
HB	9	Tevita Leo-Latu
PR	8	Antonio Kaufusi
HK	13	Willie Manu
PR	10	Awen Guttenbeil
SR	11	Lopini Paea (c)
SR	12	Richard Fa'aoso
LK	20	Tony Williams
Substitutions:
IC	14	Manase Manuokafoa
IC	15	Epalahame Lauaki
IC	16	Sam Moa
IC	17	Eddie Paea
Coach:
(Australia) Jim Dymock

=== Ireland vs Samoa ===
5 November 2008
18:55 ADST (UTC+11:00)

Ireland	34–16	Samoa
Tries: Pat Richards 12', 43', 79'; Simon Finnigan 14'; Sean Gleeson 19'; Liam Finn 71'; Goals: Pat Richards (5)	Report	Tries: Nigel Vagana 25'; Misi Taulapapa 35'; David Solomona 75' Goals: Ben Roberts (2)

Parramatta Stadium, Sydney
Attendance: 8,067
Referee: Thierry Alibert (France)
Player of the Match: Pat Richards (Ireland)

Ireland	Samoa

FB	1	Michael Platt
RW	2	Damien Blanch
RC	3	Sean Gleeson
LC	4	Stuart Littler
LW	5	Pat Richards
SO	6	Scott Grix (c)
SH	7	Liam Finn
PR	8	Eamon O'Carroll
HK	9	Bob Beswick
PR	10	Gareth Haggerty
SR	11	Ben Harrison
SR	12	Lee Doran
LF	13	Simon Finnigan
Substitutions:
IC	14	Michael McIlorum
IC	15	Karl Fitzpatrick
IC	16	Wayne Kerr
IC	17	Ryan Tandy
Coach:
(England) Andy Kelly

FB	1	Smith Samau
RW	2	Matt Utai
RC	3	Willie Talau
LC	4	George Carmont
LW	5	Francis Meli
FE	6	Nigel Vagana (c)
HB	7	Ben Roberts
PR	8	Wayne McDade
HK	9	Terrence Seu Seu
PR	10	Tony Puletua
SR	11	Lagi Setu
SR	15	Ali Lauitiiti
LK	13	Harrison Hansen
Substitutions:
IC	12	David Solomona
IC	14	Frank Puletua
IC	16	Joseph Paulo
IC	17	Misi Taulapapa
Coach:
(New Zealand) John Ackland
