= Penrith Stadium =

Stadium in Penrith, New South Wales, Australia

Penrith Stadium Helloworld Stadium
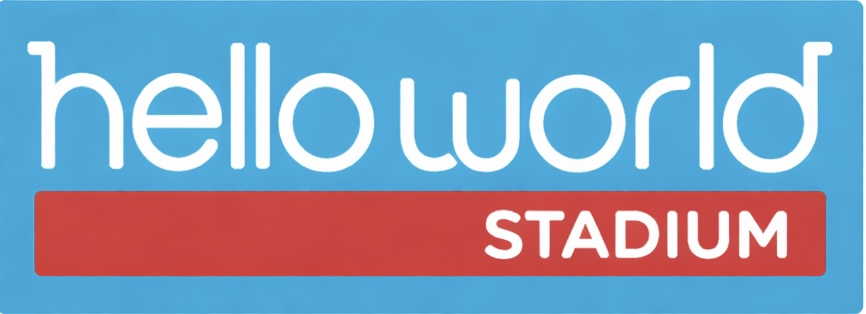

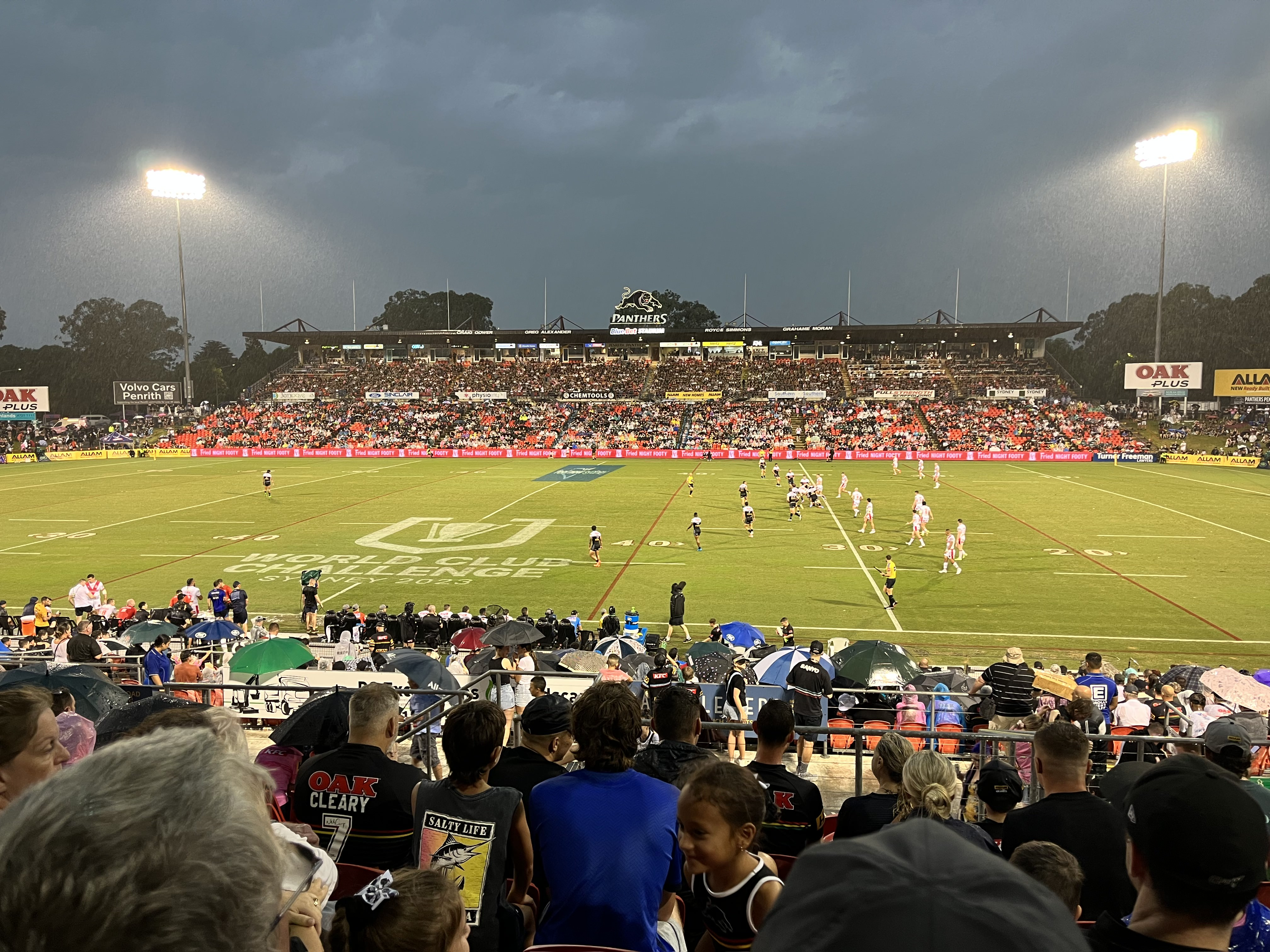
- Penrith Stadium during the 2023 World Club Challenge.
- Interactive map of Penrith Stadium; Helloworld Stadium
- Former names: Penrith Park; Penrith Football Stadium; Credit Union Australia Stadium (2006–10); Centrebet Stadium (2011–13); Sportingbet Stadium (2014); McGrath Foundation Stadium; Pepper Stadium (2015–17); Panthers Stadium (2018–21); Bluebet Stadium (2022–24); Helloworld Stadium (2026-31)
- Location: Mulgoa Road, Penrith, New South Wales
- Coordinates: 33°45′31″S 150°41′16″E
- Owner: Crown Land Trustees Penrith City Council
- Operator: Panthers Leagues Club
- Capacity: 25,000
- Surface: Grass
- Record attendance: 22,582 – Penrith vs Parramatta, 2010
- Field size: 130m × 68m
- Public transit: Penrith

Construction
- Opened: 23 April 1967
- Closed: 13 September 2024

Tenants
- Penrith Panthers (NSWRL/ARL/NRL) (SL) (1967–2024); Penrith Nepean United (NSWPL); Penrith City SC (NSL) (1984–1985)

Website
- www.helloworldstadium.com.au

Penrith Stadium, also known as Helloworld Stadium for sponsorship reasons, is a rugby league and association football stadium located in Penrith, New South Wales, Australia.

The 22,500 capacity venue is the home ground for the Penrith Panthers who play in the National Rugby League (NRL). The all-time attendance record for the venue is 22,582 in a match between the Panthers and their Western Sydney rivals Parramatta on 17 July 2010. It closed on 13 September 2024 for redevelopment that will include a new western grandstand and refurbished eastern grandstand increasing the ground capacity to 25,000.

== History ==
Panthers Stadium has been used by the Penrith Panthers since their entry into the New South Wales Rugby League competition in 1967. Initially, the stadium only had one main grandstand, the Western grandstand while the ground itself was oval in shape. In the 1980s, the stadium was redeveloped into a rectangle arena more suitable for rugby league and other sports such as association football (soccer) and rugby union. This redevelopment also saw the construction of the Eastern Grandstand. In 2006, a joint Federal and State Government funding project saw $30 million worth of investments come to the stadium. In the subsequent developments, the Western Grandstand was extended and revamped. Following the completion of the project, the stadium held 8,000 seats in the grandstand.

Two of Samoa's 2008 Rugby League World Cup matches were played at CUA Stadium: their Group C game against Tonga and their 9th place play-off match against former twice World Cup finalists France.

It was briefly featured in a 2009 60 Minutes episode titled "Brute Force" showing Public Order & Riot Squad officers across Sydney.

At the end of 2010, the Federal and State Governments provided funding to redevelop the scoreboard end of the stadium. Initial plans were to build a double-sided grandstand between Penrith Stadium and Howell Oval. However, it was found that a main sewer line ran between the stadium and Howell Oval. Relocation of the line would have cost nearly double what the initial funding would cover. Subsequently, a stand was built at Howell Oval, and the facilities at the scoreboard end of the stadium were redeveloped.

A new video screen was purchased from Subiaco Oval in Perth in 2018 and was installed prior to the start of the 2019 NRL season at the Family Hill end.

In 2021 the Government of New South Wales considered funding a major redevelopment of the stadium. The proposal would have entailed the demolition of the facility and the construction of a 25,000 to 30,000-seat stadium on the site. The stadium was reported to cost $200 to $300 million and would be built with the funds originally allocated for the redevelopment of Stadium Australia which was cancelled due to the COVID-19 pandemic. On 9 December 2021, Premier, Dominic Perrottet and Stuart Ayres, minister for Tourism and Western Sydney, alongside Penrith Panthers players Nathan Cleary and Brian To'o officially announced the new stadium. Under the original plan, the stadium would have closed and been demolished at the end of the 2022 NRL season and reopened in 2025.

However, in July 2022, the NSW government entered talks with the Penrith Paceway, a major horse racing facility, to buy the land it sits on to build a brand new stadium. The new plan would have allowed the Panthers to play at the existing site until the new stadium was built.

In February 2023, the ground hosted the 2023 World Club Challenge clash between two-time reigning NRL premiers the Penrith Panthers and four-time defending Super League champions St Helens R.F.C.

Following a change in government, in January 2024, the Government of New South Wales announced revised plans for a new $309 million renovation to transform the Stadium precinct into a modern venue for sporting and entertainment. The redevelopment will include a new western grandstand and refurbished eastern grandstand increasing the ground capacity from 22,500 to 25,000. To facilitate the redevelopment, the stadium closed after the 2024 NRL season and is scheduled to reopen in 2026 with the Panthers to play out of Western Sydney Stadium. The final NRL game at Penrith Stadium prior to redevelopment took place on September 13, 2024, with Penrith taking on the Sydney Roosters in a Qualifying Final in front of a sellout crowd of 21,483.

== Naming rights ==
Penrith Stadium was sponsored by Credit Union Australia, who previously held the naming rights, from early 2006 until 31 October 2010. The stadium's name was sometimes shortened to CUA Stadium.

On 22 January 2011, it was announced that sport betting agency Centrebet had acquired the rights to the sponsorship name of the stadium until 2016. Under their sponsorship rights the stadium was also known as the "Centrebet Stadium Penrith".

On 21 June 2011, it was announced that, for the Women in League round of the NRL, Centrebet had agreed to forego the naming rights for one week, during which time the stadium would officially be known as McGrath Foundation Stadium.

On 28 January 2014, it was announced that sport betting agency Sportingbet acquired the rights to the sponsorship name of the stadium, changing the stadium's name to Sportingbet Stadium Penrith. In 2015, Pepper Money replaced Sportingbet as the naming rights sponsor, renaming the stadium to Pepper Stadium.

At the end of 2017, Pepper Group ended its sponsorship of the ground and the stadium was renamed Panthers Stadium.

On 22 March 2021, BlueBet was announced as the stadium's naming rights partner, signing a two-year deal.

On 12 March 2026, it was announced that the Australian-based travel agency Helloworld Travel acquired the rights to the sponsorship name of the stadium, changing the stadium's name to Helloworld Stadium.

== Tenants ==
In the National Rugby League competition, the Penrith Panthers club have played at this stadium, as their home ground, ever since making their first grade appearance in 1967.

In the National Soccer League, the Penrith City SC club played here in 1984–1985.

The stadium hosted a Western Sydney Wanderers pre-season friendly against Adelaide United on 22 September 2013, and was host to a competitive A-League Premiership match against the Wellington Phoenix on 8 February 2015. The Wanderers also played an FFA Cup match against Brisbane Roar at the venue on 11 August 2015.

On 16 September 2017 the venue hosted an international women's friendly football game when the Matildas defeated Brazil 2–1 in front of a crowd of 15,089.

== Rugby league test matches ==
List of rugby league test and World Cup matches played at Penrith Stadium.

Test#	Date	Result	Attendance	Notes
1	7 October 2006	Fiji def. Cook Islands 40–4	1,713	2008 Rugby League World Cup qualifying
2	31 October 2008	Samoa def. Tonga 20–12	11,787	2008 Rugby League World Cup Group C
3	9 November 2008	Samoa def. France 42–10	8,028	2008 Rugby League World Cup 9th-place playoff
4	20 April 2013	Tonga def. Samoa 36–4	10,143	2013 Polynesian Cup
5	3 May 2014	Samoa def. Fiji 32–16	9,063	2014 Pacific Test

== International Soccer matches ==
List of International Football matches played at Penrith Stadium.

Test#	Date	Result	Attendance	Notes
1	16 September 2017	Australia 2–1 Brazil	15,089	International Women's Friendly
2	10 November 2018	Australia 2–3 Chile	15,185	International Women's Friendly

== Gallery ==
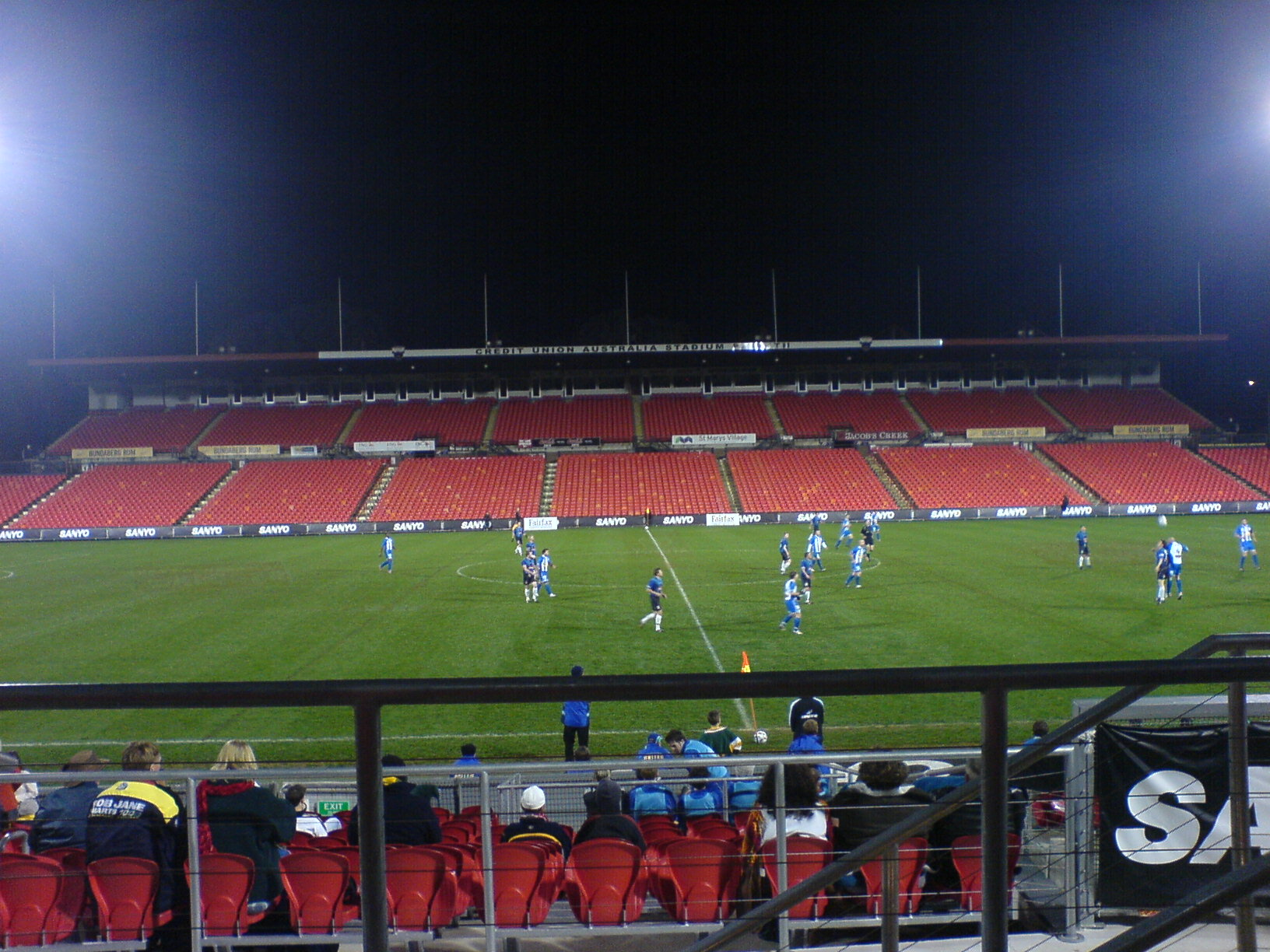
Penrith Stadium from halfway

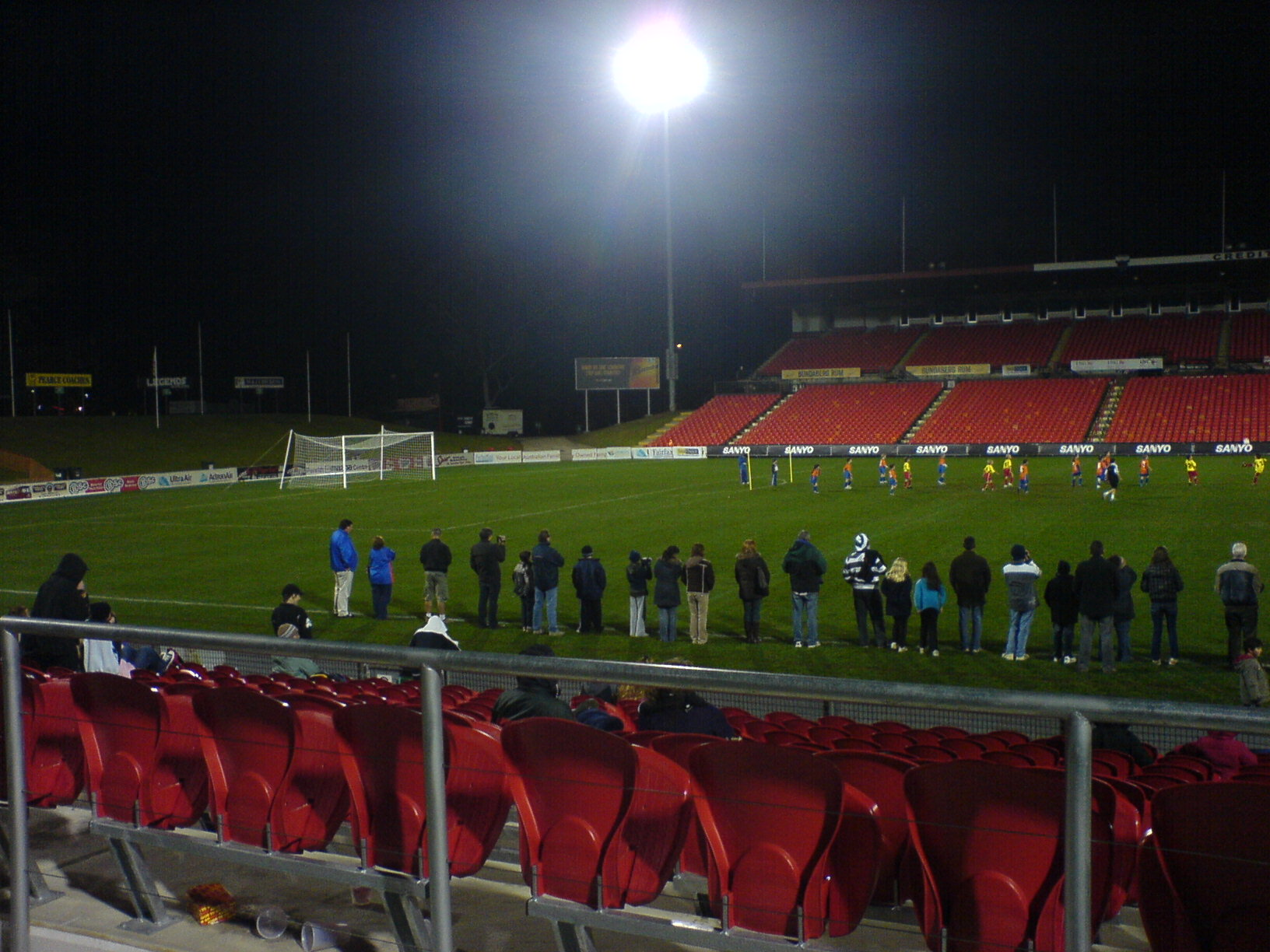
Family Hill End of the Stadium

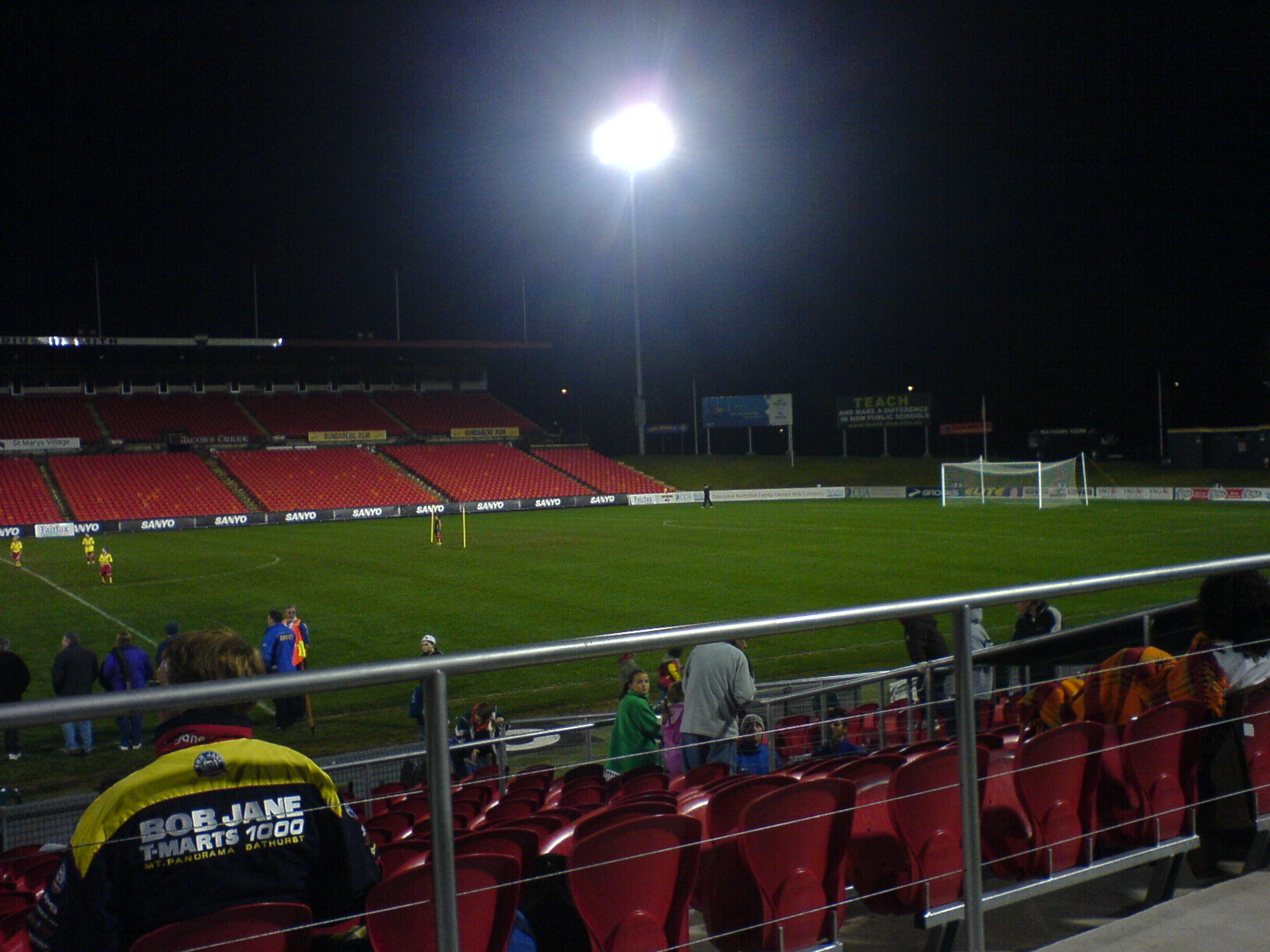
Scoreboard End of the Stadium

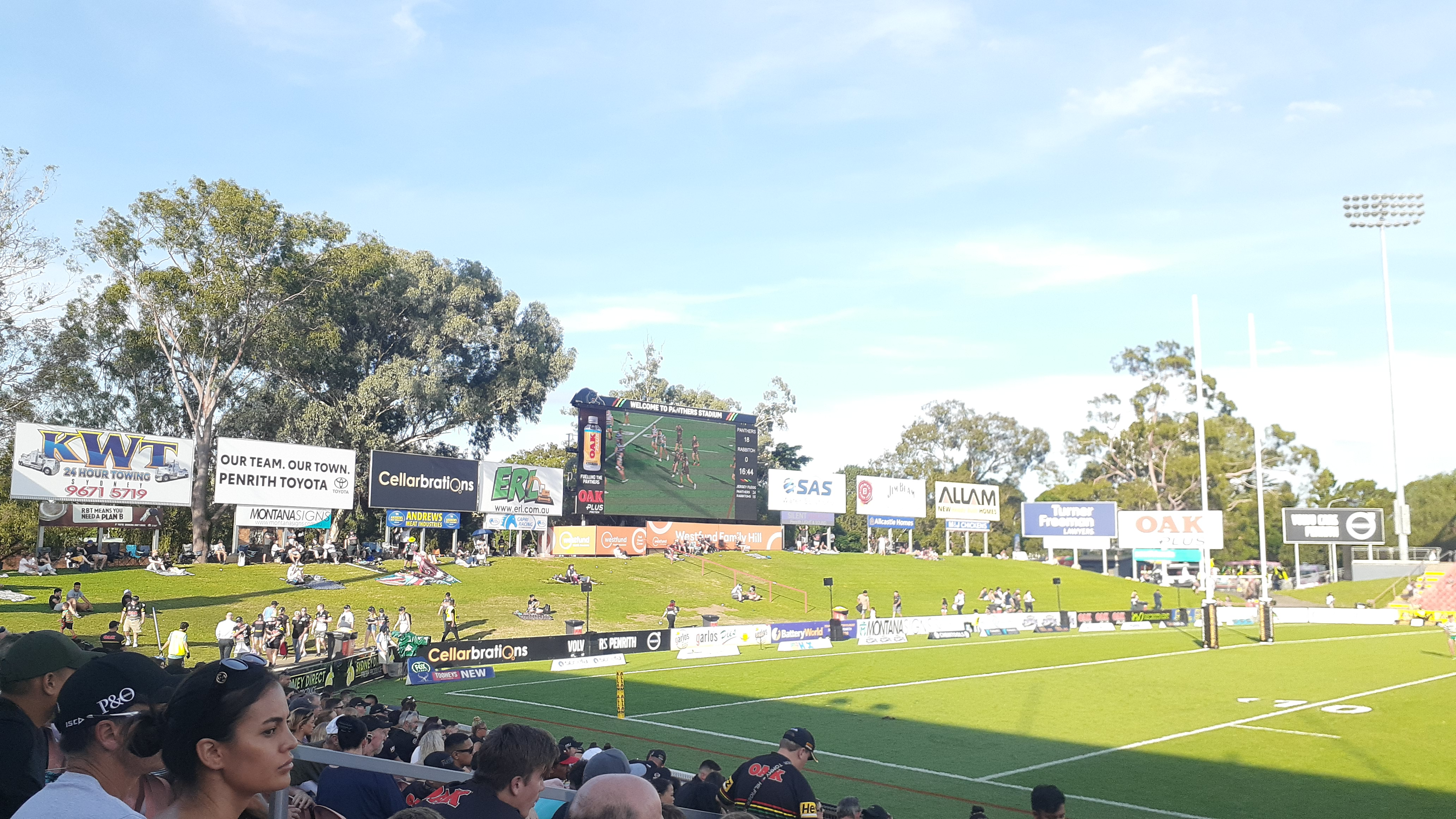
The Family Hill End of the Stadium in 2021 with the video screen purchased from Subiaco Oval visible

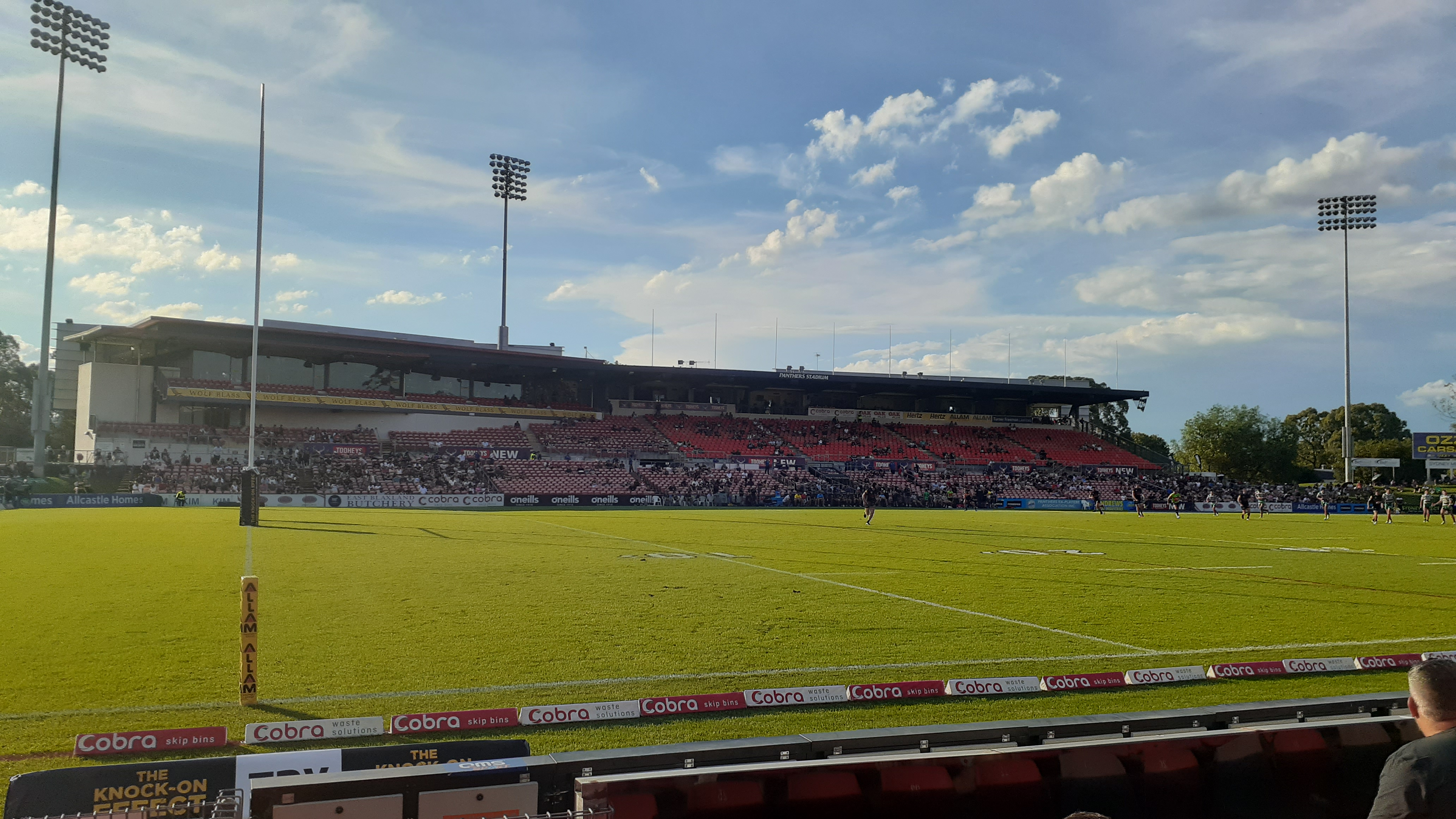
The main grandstand at the Stadium prior to Penrith Panthers vs North Queensland Cowboys in 2021
