= 2004 rugby league betting scandal =

2004 saw a scandal in the sport of rugby league involving Great Britain international players Sean Long and Martin Gleeson. Both players were playing for St. Helens at the time; the match in question was between Bradford Bulls and St Helens on Easter Monday, April 2004.

== History ==
St Helens were scheduled to face Huddersfield Giants in the 2004 Challenge Cup Semi-Final. They had been given a demanding draw in the competition and had already knocked out top teams Bradford, Leeds Rhinos and Hull F.C. in previous rounds. In addition, the Semi-Final was to be played the weekend after the tough Easter period, in which Super League teams are required to play 3 games in a week. As a result, the St Helens squad, having already competed in three more high-intensity matches than all the other Super League teams, were struggling to cope and coach Ian Millward was worried about his players becoming fatigued and losing form heading into the semi-final. To counter this, he rested eleven first choice players for the clash with defending Super League champions Bradford, effectively playing his reserves and accepting certain defeat in that game.

Knowing that St Helens were set to field a weakened side, Long and Gleeson placed bets on Bradford to win. Gleeson bet £1,000 that Bradford would win by a margin greater than eight points, whilst Long placed a bet of similar value on the Bulls' victory.

Bradford won 54–8. Long was one of the players left out of the squad but Gleeson was selected by Millward, and indeed scored the first try.

Both players admitted their guilt and apologised for their actions. An RFL investigation chaired by a panel comprising Judge Peter Charlesworth, Deryck Fox, and David Poulter accepted that there was no evidence to suggest Gleeson had attempted to play badly to influence the result, but both players were declared guilty of breaching an RFL by law prohibiting players betting on matches in which their club was involved, regardless of whether or not they were involved in the game.

They were each fined £7,500 and ordered to pay £2,205 costs. Long was handed a three-month and Gleeson a four-month suspension. A few weeks after receiving the suspension, Gleeson signed for Warrington Wolves for a fee reported at £200,000.
