= Parramatta Stadium =

Defunct sports stadium in Parramatta, New South Wales, Australia,

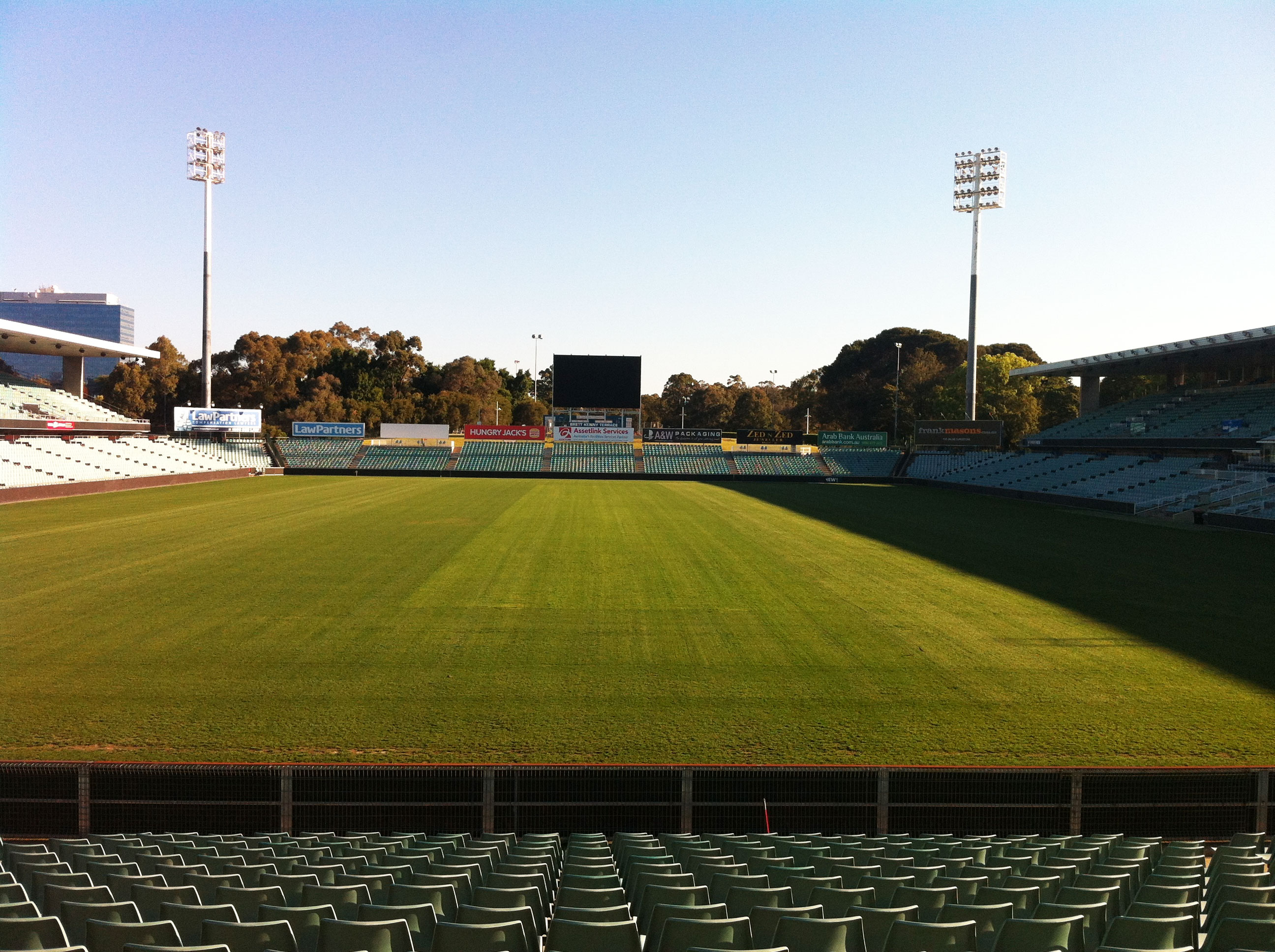
- Interactive map of Parramatta Stadium
- Location: Parramatta, New South Wales, Australia
- Coordinates: 33°48′29″S 150°59′59″E
- Owner: NSW Government
- Operator: Parramatta Stadium Trust
- Capacity: 24,000 (Venue capacity); 20,741 (Seating capacity)
- Executive suites: 17
- Surface: Grass
- Record attendance: 27,318 – Australia vs France, 6 July 1994 (rugby league)
- Field size: 140 x 80 metres

Construction
- Groundbreaking: 1985
- Opened: 1986
- Closed: 2016
- Demolished: 2016
- Architect: Civil & Civic

Tenants
- Parramatta Eels (NRL) (1986–2016); Sydney Wave (ABL) (1991–1992); Sydney Storm (ABL) (1993–1996); Sydney Tigers (ARL) (1995–1996); Sydney Bulldogs (ARL) (1995); Parramatta Power (NSL) (1999–2004); Western Sydney Wanderers (A-League) (2012–2016); Greater Sydney Rams (NRC) (2014–2015)

Parramatta Stadium was a sports stadium in Parramatta, New South Wales, Australia, 24 km (15 mi) west of Sydney CBD. The stadium was the home ground of several western Sydney-based sports teams, at the time of closure the most notable were the Parramatta Eels of the National Rugby League and the Western Sydney Wanderers of the A-League.

Cumberland Oval was the local name for the cricket, motor sports and rugby venue that had existed prior to Parramatta Stadium being built, with the area having been used for recreational activities since 1788, the founding year of the British colony in New South Wales.

The stadium also hosted numerous other sporting and cultural events since its opening in 1986. Michael Jackson performed there during his Bad World Tour on 20–21 November 1987, and Paul McCartney concluded the Australian leg of The New World Tour with two shows there on 22–23 March 1993.

In 2015 the NSW Government announced that the stadium would be demolished and replaced, and to that end, Parramatta Stadium was demolished in February 2017, with the new Western Sydney Stadium built in the same location.

== Cumberland Oval ==
=== 1788 to 1947 ===
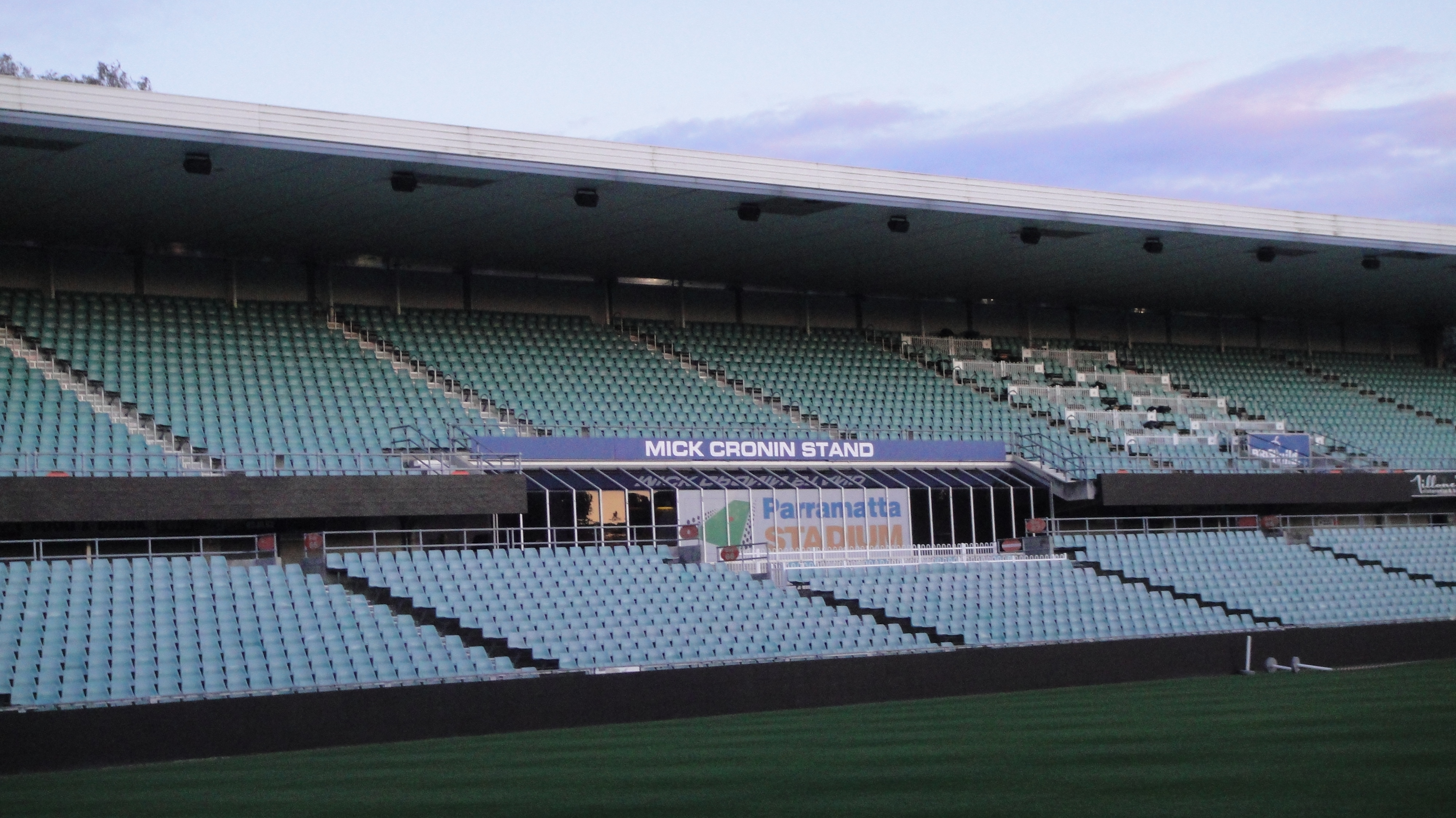
Parramatta Stadium Eastern Stand.

Cumberland Oval was the main sporting venue for the Parramatta District from the mid 19th Century until 1982. It was initially a venue for horse-racing, cricket and athletics then for rugby union from 1879 and rugby league from 1909. Motorsports racing started in 1930 with motorcycles, then speedcars in 1936. Among the famous names who used the oval in their respective sports were English cricketer W. G. Grace, and Australia's triple Formula One World Champion Jack Brabham who raced in midget cars at the Cumberland Speedway in the 1940s.

The first stand at Cumberland Oval was built in 1850 and others followed at various times up to the final stand was built in 1936. Players from the local cricket club erected a two-rail fence around the oval during the 1860s but a solid planked safety barrier was needed for motor cycle racing, although this did not stop several deaths occurring as a result of crashes. The dirt track was originally 18 feet in width until expanded to 30 feet for the speedcars. The boundary fence and track remained in place after all speedway racing ended in 1959.

Some of the early touring English cricket teams played at Cumberland Oval at a time when Parramatta was "way out in the country". The cricket club evolved as Central Cumberland for the initial Sydney Grade Competition in 1893/94. When the nearby King's School moved to North Parramatta during the 1970s the turf pitches were removed and the cricket club moved to the oval that had been the school's main sports ground. The club now known as the Parramatta District Cricket Club still has the Old Kings Oval as its main ground. The Parramatta Rugby Union club now plays at Granville Rugby Park.

=== Rugby League ===
Cumberland Oval was originally used for rugby league by the Parramatta Iona and Endeavours clubs and the Western Districts representative side. When the Parramatta District Rugby League Club, later renamed to the Parramatta Eels, was admitted into the NSWRL Premiership in 1947, Cumberland Oval became the club's home ground. The first match was played against Newtown (now Newtown Jets) on 12 April 1947, before a crowd of 6,000. The largest crowd to watch a rugby league match at Cumberland Oval was 22,470 when the Eels took on the South Sydney Rabbitohs on 26 April 1971. The club lost the 1976 Grand Final 13–10 to Manly, and the 1977 Grand Final replay 22–0 to St George after the first Grand Final was drawn 9-9.

=== Burning down the Grandstand ===
The 1981 NSWRFL season saw the first premiership success for the Eels as they finished 3rd in the regular season before defeating the Newtown Jets 20 to 11 on Sunday 27 September 1981. As the Parramatta Eels secured their first-ever Premiership, defeating the Newtown Jets in the 1981 Grand Final, wildly jubilant scenes erupted in Parramatta, the Leagues club quickly overflowed with Eels fans celebrating with thousands rallying at nearby Cumberland Oval and, in a frenzy of vandalism, burned the Oval's grandstand to the ground. For a while some junior rugby league matches were played on the unfenced oval before the site was eventually redeveloped. In November 1984 the construction company Civil & Civic won the contract to design and build a new stadium.

In November 1985 the stadium was complete, with a rectangular playing area several metres below the Cumberland Oval surface.

== Parramatta Stadium ==
On 5 March 1986 the Parramatta Stadium was opened by Queen Elizabeth II. On 16 March the first NSWRL Premiership match was played at the ground with 26,870 in attendance. Parramatta's Steve Sharp scored the ground's first try in the Eels' 36 – 6 victory over the St. George Dragons. The only try for the Dragons came when centre Michael O'Connor fielded an infield kick from Eels front rower Paul Mares and raced 91 metres to score with a flying Eric Grothe only just failing to stop him as he came across in cover.

On 20 May 1990, the 1989–90 National Soccer League Grand Final between western Sydney based clubs Sydney Olympic and the Marconi Stallions was played at the venue. Olympic win the match 2–0 in what was the highest soccer attendance at Parramatta Stadium stands at 26,353.

On 19 June 1992, the Parramatta Eels versus Great Britain Lions game on the Lions 1992 tour of Australasia attracted a crowd of 18,220, the largest non-Test match crowd of the Lions tour, with Parramatta winning 22–16. Prior to the match, Parramatta and Great Britain winger's Lee Oudenryn and Martin Offiah, generally regarded at the time as the fastest player in rugby league, faced off in a Tooheys Blue Label challenge race over 100m (try line to try line). Oudenryn caused what many believed to be a huge upset by defeating Offiah by approximately half a metre.

In December 2002, work began on converting the formerly grassed hill areas (The Brett Kenny Hill and The Peter Sterling Hill) into seated terrace areas (holding 4,500 spectators). This redevelopment reduced the ground's capacity to 21,500, down from the previous capacity of 27,000.

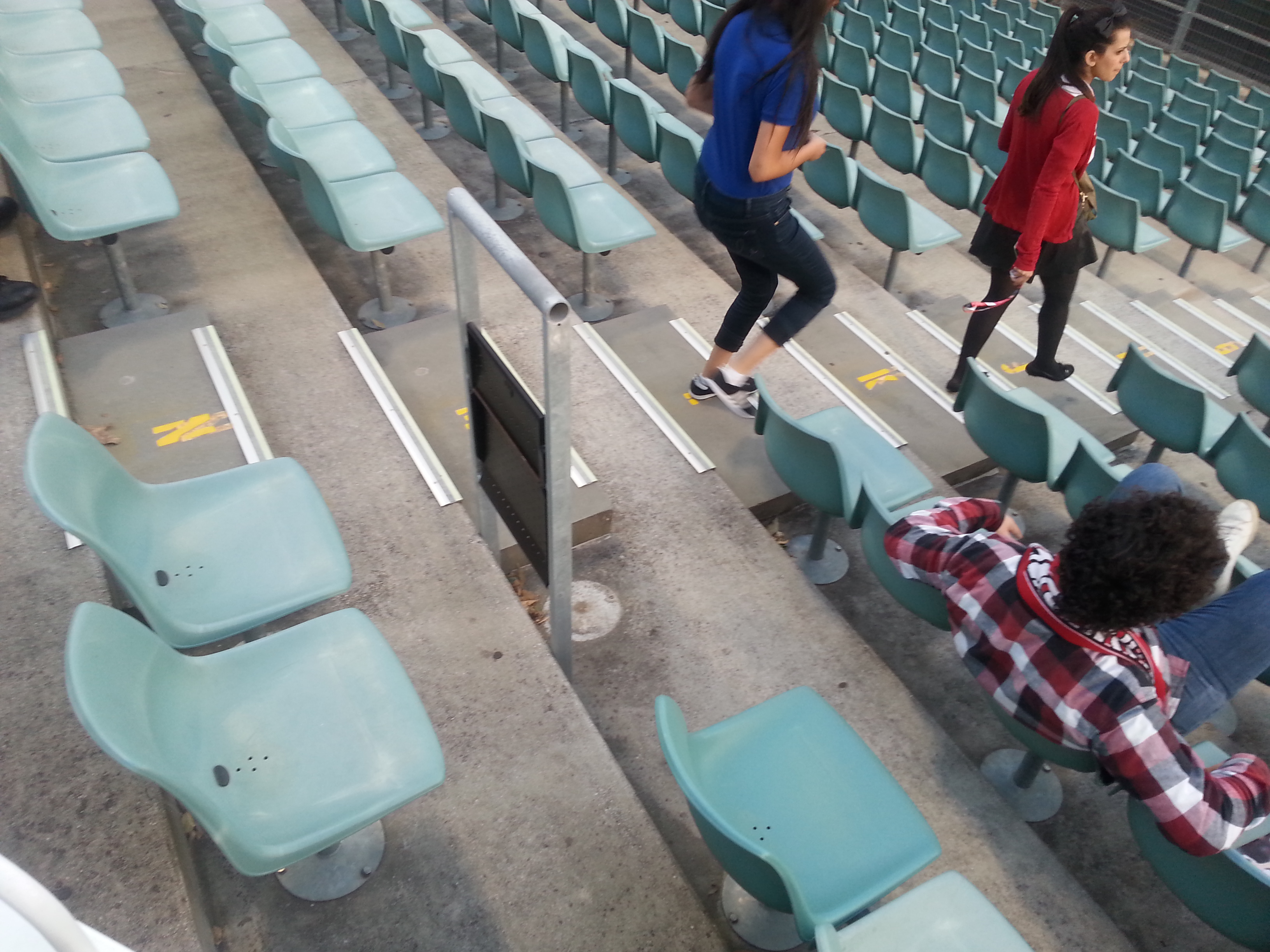
Rail seat test install.

On 23 March 2013, the third A-League Sydney derby saw the highest A-League attendance at Parramatta Stadium, with 19,585 turning out for the occasion, which ended in a 1–1 draw.

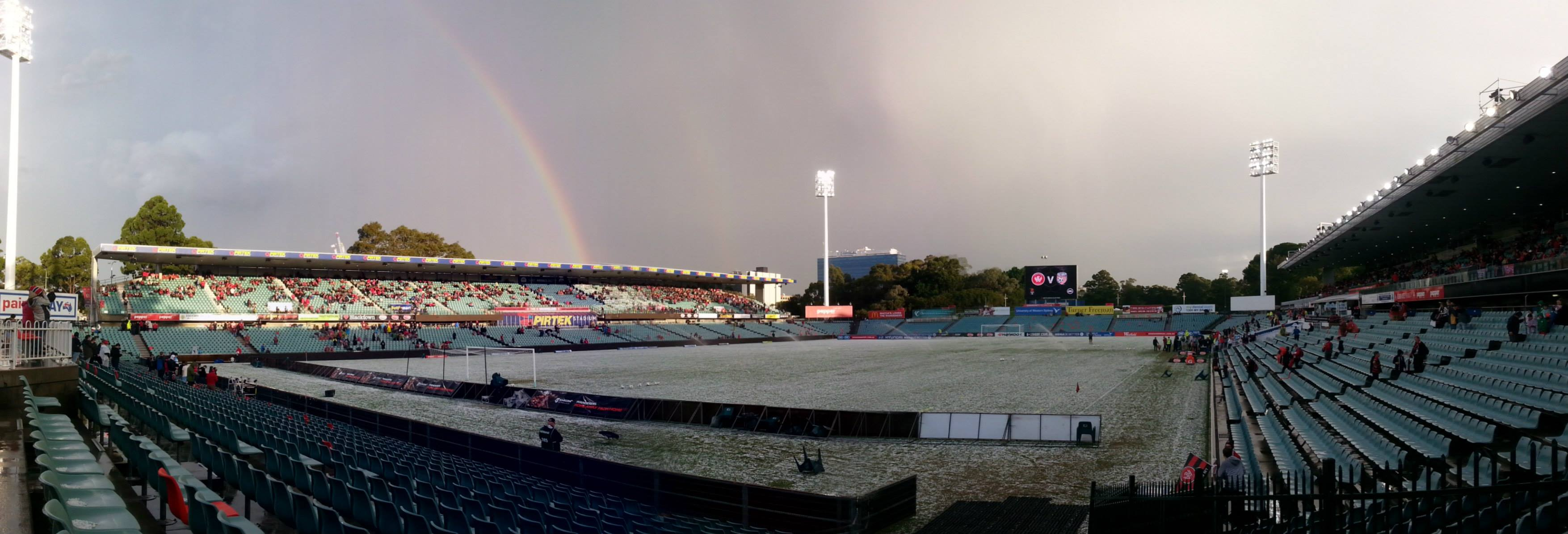
April 2015 Hail before A-League match.

Parramatta Stadium announced on 9 October 2013, that for the first time in the history of the stadium that it would take on a naming rights sponsor, with Pirtek, a hydraulics company with origins in Western Sydney winning the rights and naming it "Pirtek Stadium", which lasted until the demolition.

== All-seater expansion & redevelopment ==
After the conversion to an all-seater stadium, plans to further expand Parramatta Stadium were originally initiated in May 2007. The Parramatta Stadium Trust announced plans to build a new southern stand with room for 2,700 extra patrons as well as a players change room and gym. The plans were not followed through on and no construction was done.

In 2010, a commission was done to establish a "Master Plan" for the future development the stadium. The master plan, if completed, would have the stadium finish with a capacity of 31,300 seats as well as extensive redevelopment of the facilities at the stadium for players, corporate sponsors, the media and supporters.

On 2 July 2013, the Australian Federal Government, the New South Wales State Government and Parramatta Local Council announced an expansion for the stadium. A pre-existing fund of $8 million for upgrading the stadium was combined with $20 million of new funding. The expansion was expected to increase the capacity of the stadium to 24,700.

Western Sydney Wanderers along with active support group the Red and Black Bloc campaigned for the installation of German style rail seating to enable safe standing in the northern stands as part of the 2015 refurbishment. In 2013, the club imported seven sets of rail seats and worked with Parramatta Stadium to perform a test installation. The proposed installation would have been the first safe seating in the country, in any sport. However, it didn't move past the planning stage. It was included in the rebuilt stadium however, as a dual purpose modular system of seats or railings.

In June 2014 the NSW State Government embarked on citywide "Stadium Strategy", intended to cease investment in small suburban grounds, and spend a large amount of money on a small number of new modern facilities. This strategy was developed as the Parramatta Stadium refurbishment completed new corporate hospitality facilities, player facilities, food and drink outlets, bathrooms, training field and gym facilities, all of which were located in the main grandstand. They were completed in mid-2015, while the additional seating at either end of the ground was halted pending a decision on where Parramatta would stand in the new stadium strategy.

== Replacement ==
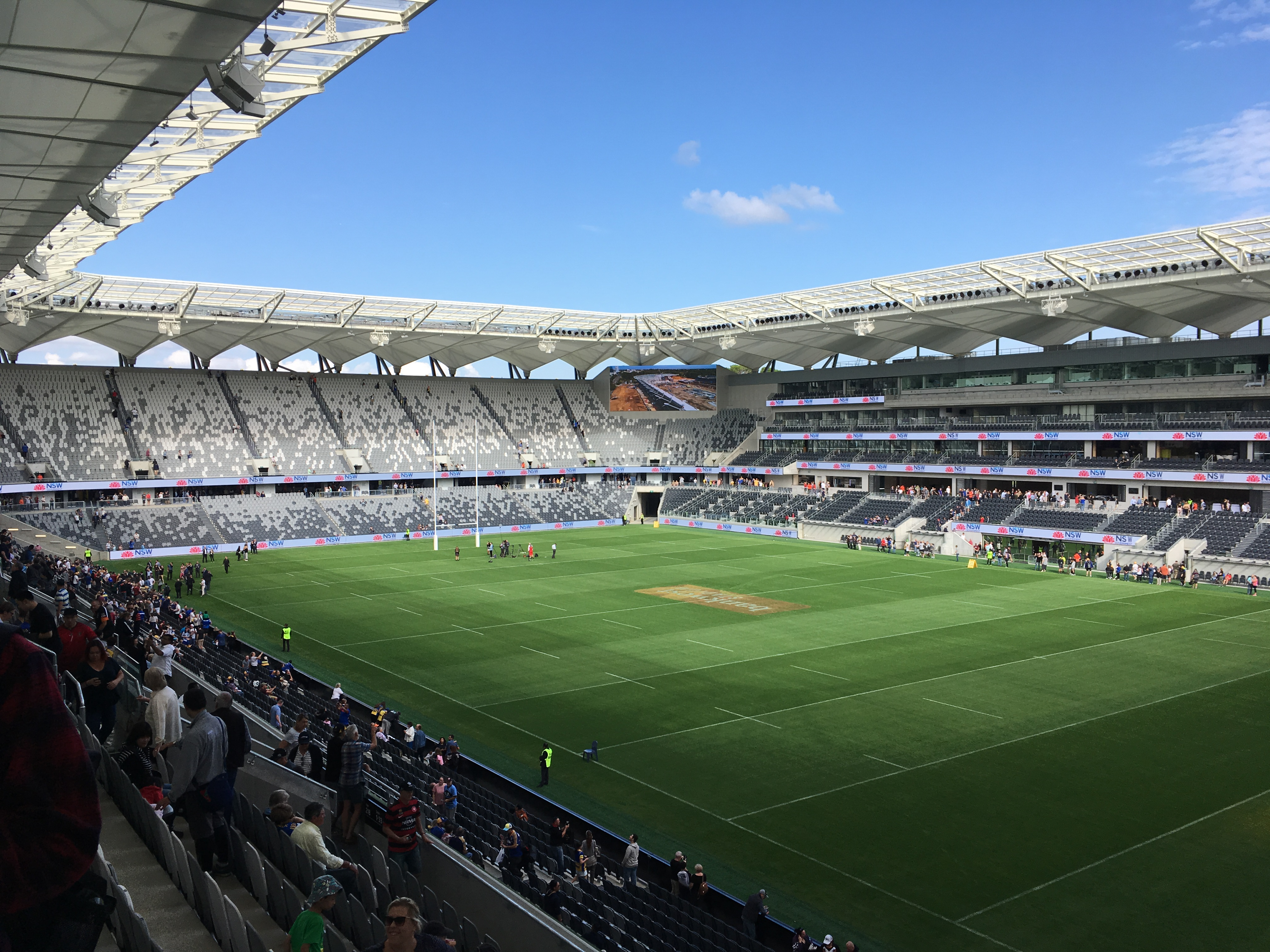
Western Sydney Stadium

In September 2015, the New South Wales Government announced that the stadium would be replaced with a new 30,000 seat venue on the same site, officially named the Western Sydney Stadium. Construction began in 2017 and was completed in April 2019.

Parramatta Stadium's last A-League match was a semi-final between the Western Sydney Wanderers and Brisbane Roar where the Wanderers came from a 3–0 deficit to win the game 5–4 in extra time. The Parramatta Eels hosted the final game of first grade rugby league at the ground, defeating St George Illawarra 30–18, with Bevan French scoring three tries in a blowout scoreline.

The final ever game to be played at the ground was the 2016 Intrust Super Premiership NSW grand final between Mounties and Illawarra with Illawarra winning their first and only premiership 21–20.

== Uses ==
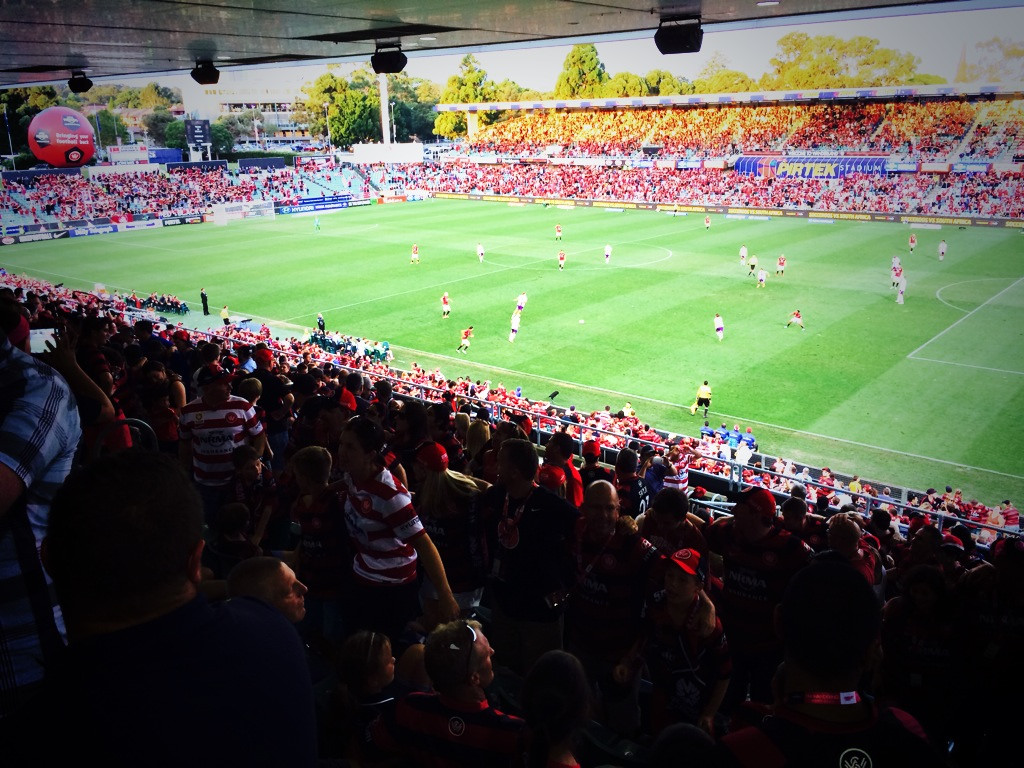
An A-League match in progress at Parramatta Stadium

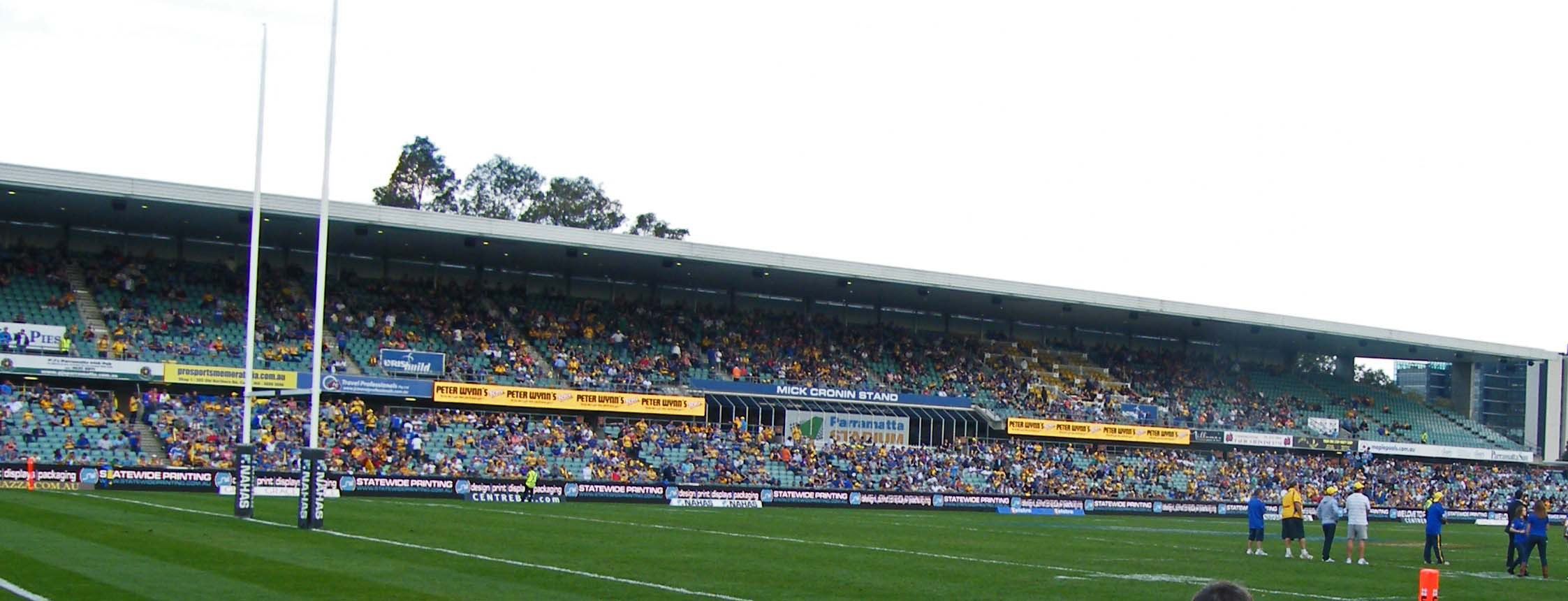
Parramatta Stadium during rugby league.

Between 1999 and 2004, the stadium was home to Parramatta Power, a National Soccer League (NSL) club owned and operated by the Parramatta Leagues Club (owner of the Parramatta Eels rugby league club). With the announcement of the demise of the NSL and the creation of the A-League, the club was wound-up at the end of the 2003–04 season. Parramatta Power contested the last NSL Grand Final against Perth Glory at the stadium. The ground hosted seven NSL Grand Final matches, in 1986 (second leg), 1988, 1989, 1990, 1993, 2001 and 2004. In April 2007, Sydney FC played one game in the AFC Champions League against Persik Kediri at Parramatta Stadium. In February 2010, during the 2009–10 A-League season, Sydney FC defeated Perth Glory 3–2. The game had been moved from the Sydney Football Stadium due to the Edinburgh Military tattoo. On 26 July 2012, new A-League club Western Sydney Wanderers announced a five-year deal with Parramatta Stadium, and made its debut with a crowd of 10,458. On 25 October 2014, the stadium hosted the first leg of the 2014 AFC Champions League Final between Western Sydney Wanderers and Saudi Arabian side Al-Hilal.

Parramatta Stadium has been used for various rugby league matches such as pre-season Sevens tournaments in 1989 and 1990, and a test match against France in 1994. Parramatta Eels is the main Rugby League team to use this stadium as their home-ground usage in the NRL premiership season. They have been here since 1986. In 1995 and 1996, the ground was also used for the short-lived Sydney Tigers, what became of Balmain Tigers. In 1997 the Sydney Tigers went back to being the Balmain Tigers and moved back to Leichhardt Oval. Also in 1995, the Canterbury-Bankstown Bulldogs team changed their name to 'Sydney Bulldogs', and played their home games at this ground. In 1996, they reverted to their original name and returned to Belmore Oval.

The stadium was used as a host venue for the 2008 Rugby League World Cup and the 2010 Four Nations. Two of Ireland's 2008 Rugby League World Cup Group C games were played at Parramatta Stadium: one against Tonga and the other against Samoa. When the Parramatta Eels were playing the ground's eastern grandstand is named the Mick Cronin Stand and the western grandstand, the Ken Thornett Stand in honour of two of the club's leading former players.

On 18 September 1997 two 1999 Rugby World Cup qualifiers – Western Samoa vs Tonga and Australia vs Fiji—were played at Parramatta Stadium. A number of NSW Rugby Union club matches were played at the ground between 2001 and 2002. Australia A also played a match against Canada in 2002 at Parramatta Stadium. During 2007, Parramatta Stadium was also the home ground for the Western Sydney Rams club side that participated in the now defunct Australian Rugby Championship.

Baseball was played at Parramatta Stadium with the Sydney Blues playing home matches there. The Blues entered the Australian Baseball League in 1992 and played out of Parramatta Stadium. Due to the rectangular pitch there was controversy due to the extremely short home run fence that was only 230 feet, 100 less than is typical for a baseball game. The Sydney Blues were later known as the Sydney Storm and played there occasionally until the collapse of the Australian Baseball League in 1999. During the 93/94 Finals series, Game 2 between Sydney and the Brisbane Bandits attracted a record Australian baseball league crowd of 13,700 fans at Parramatta that saw Brisbane win the championship series 2-0 after a 10-9 thriller in favour of the visiting side.

== Record attendances ==
- The highest crowd to attend a match at Parramatta Stadium was for the rugby league Test match between Australia and France in 1994. This game attracted a crowd of 27,318 fans and was the first test played in Sydney since 1909 that was not played at either the Agricultural Oval (Sydney Showground), Sydney Cricket Ground or the Sydney Football Stadium.
- The highest crowd to attend a match at Parramatta Stadium for a club match was 27,243 (Parramatta Eels versus South Sydney Rabbitohs in round 24 of the 1986 NSWRL season.)
- The highest crowd for a soccer match at Parramatta Stadium was 26,353, which was for the 1990 NSL Grand Final between Sydney Olympic and Marconi Stallions.
- The highest crowd to attend a match at Parramatta Stadium after the redevelopment of the hill areas is 21,141 (Parramatta Eels versus Wests Tigers in round 7 of the 2006 NRL season.)

== Rugby league test matches ==
List of rugby league test matches played at the stadium.

Test#	Date	Result	Attendance	Notes
1	6 July 1994	Australia def. France 58–0	27,318	First test in Sydney ever played at a suburban ground
2	27 October 2008	Tonga def. Ireland 22–20	6,165	Played as part of the 2008 World Cup
3	5 November 2008	Ireland def. Samoa 34–16	8,602	Played as part of the 2008 World Cup
4	24 October 2010	Samoa def. Tonga 22–6	11,308	Played as a curtain raiser match for the game listed below
5	24 October 2010	Australia def. Papua New Guinea 42–0	11,308	Played as part of the 2010 Four Nations
6	7 May 2016	Papua New Guinea def. Fiji 24–22	15,225	2016 Melanesian Cup
7	7 May 2016	Samoa def. Tonga 18–6	15,225	2016 Polynesian Cup
