= Martin Gleeson (rugby league) =

Former GB & England international rugby league footballer

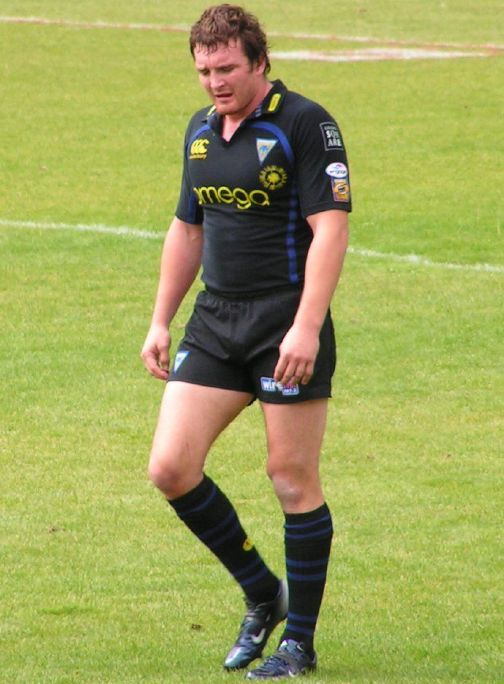

Personal information
- Full name: Martin Gleeson
- Born: 25 May 1980 (age 45) Wigan, Greater Manchester, England

Playing information
- Height: 6 ft 1 in (1.85 m)
- Weight: 14 st 13 lb (95 kg)
- Position: Centre
Club
Years	Team	Pld	T	G	FG	P
1999	Swinton Lions	1	0	0	0	0
1999–01	Huddersfield Giants	60	18	0	0	72
2002–04	St Helens	69	31	0	0	124
2005–09	Warrington Wolves	117	48	0	0	192
2009–11	Wigan Warriors	54	22	0	0	88
2011	Hull F.C.	7	5	0	0	20
2013–14	Salford City Reds	30	4	0	0	16
	Total	338	128	0	0	512
Representative
Years	Team	Pld	T	G	FG	P
2002–07	Great Britain	20	3	0	0	12
2008	England	6	8	0	0	32
2002–03	Lancashire	2	0	0	0	0
- Relatives: Mark Gleeson (brother); Sean Gleeson (cousin)

Martin Gleeson (born 25 May 1980) is an English rugby league coach and former professional player. He represented both Great Britain and England internationally as a centre. His clubs as a player include the Huddersfield Giants, St Helens, the Warrington Wolves, the Wigan Warriors, Hull F.C. and the Salford City Reds. His honours include winning the Super League in 2002 and 2010 and the Challenge Cup in 2004.

Gleeson was banned for three years (with half being suspended) in 2011 for failing a drugs test. His ban expired on 12 November 2012.

== Early life ==
Gleeson was born in Wigan. Much of his early rugby development took place in Australia, where he emigrated with his family at age 10 to live in Queensland, where he played his junior rugby league for the Slacks Creek Red Lions club based in Daisy Hill, Queensland. He also played alongside the future Australian and Queensland representative Brad Meyers at Brothers St. Paul, in Brisbane. In 2005, Gleeson revealed his desire to represent Queensland in State of Origin. He returned to England aged 17 and embarked on a professional career, signing for Huddersfield Giants in 1999.

== Playing career ==
=== Huddersfield Giants ===
After three seasons with the Giants, he left the club following its relegation from Super League in 2001 and signed for St Helens.

=== St Helens ===
Gleeson made his début for Great Britain against Australia in Sydney in July 2002, also participating in the test series against New Zealand at the end of the season.

At the end of his first season with St. Helens Gleeson played as a centre and scored a try in the 2002 Super League Grand Final victory against the Bradford Bulls. Having won Super League VI, St. Helens contested the 2003 World Club Challenge against the 2002 NRL Premiers, the Sydney Roosters, he played as a centre in Saints' 0-38 defeat.

An injury lay off disrupted him in 2003. Although he missed seven games between July and September, he came back at the end of the 2003's Super League VIII to win back his place in the Great Britain squad after a fine performance for England 'A' against the touring Australians.

He opened the 2004's Super League IX for St. Helens, and won the Challenge Cup against the Wigan Warriors at the Millennium Stadium, Cardiff. He and teammate Sean Long were later involved in a betting scandal that saw both players fined and suspended for the last four months of the 2004 Super League IX.

Gleeson was selected in the Great Britain team to compete in the end of season 2004 Rugby League Tri-Nations tournament. In the final against Australia he played as a centre in the Great Britain's4 4-4 defeat.

=== Warrington Wolves ===
While serving his suspension, Gleeson was signed by the Warrington Wolves for a club record fee reported in the region of £200,000, and he made his début for the Warrington Wolves in the 2005's Super League X. He recorded a personal best scoring tally of 17 tries in 27 Super League appearances, and he was named as a centre in the Super League Dream Team 2005. He was also heavily involved in providing scores for his wing partner, the New Zealand international Henry Fa'afili.

In September 2008, he was named in the 2008 England training squad for the 2008 Rugby League World Cup, and, in October 2008, he was named in the final 24-man England squad.

He was chosen for the England team to face Wales at the Keepmoat Stadium in Doncaster prior to England's departure for the World Cup.

In Group A's first match against Papua New Guinea, he played as a centre and scored a try in England's victory.

Gleeson signed a two-year extension until 2011 but, on 4 April 2009, he signed for local rivals, Wigan, on a 3½-year contract.

=== Wigan Warriors ===
Seven rounds into the 2009's Super League XIV, with both Warrington Wolves and Wigan Warriors at the time drifting outside of play-off positions, Gleeson was transferred to the Wigan Warriors on a 3½-year contract, with fullback Richie Mathers moving in the other direction. Gleeson was an integral part of Wigan Warriors' 2010's Super League XV, scoring two tries as they won the 2010 Super League Grand Final against St. Helens at Old Trafford.

His start of 2011's Super League XVI was against St. Helens in the first regular round. He also played in the side's win at the Bradford Bulls but had to be taken off in the first-half because of a hamstring injury. He recovered in time for the 2011 World Club Challenge fixture against St George Illawarra Dragons, but was ineffective and again had to be withdrawn during the match because of the injury. Before the match, the Manchester Evening News reported that, in December 2010, Gleeson had contacted the police alleging he was the victim of blackmail but had decided to drop the charge. Amid growing speculation, the club released a statement saying that he had left his hometown club with immediate effect citing his injury, disciplinary problems and a "serious distraction in his personal life" as the reasons for the departure.

=== Hull F.C. ===
Gleeson signed for the Super League club Hull F.C. on 15 April 2011 on an 18-month contract, keeping him at the club until the end of the 2012 Super League XVII. He made a try scoring debut in the 36–18 defeat of city rivals Hull Kingston Rovers in the Good Friday derby at the KC Stadium. In June, it was announced that he was suffering a stress-related illness and he was granted leave by the club. His contract with the club was terminated in September. In December, it was announced that he had failed a drugs test on 13 May in a game against Salford in which he scored two tries. He was subsequently banned for three years (with half being suspended) from 12 June which was his final game for the club against Harlequins.

=== Salford City Reds ===
In November 2012, Salford City Reds announced they had signed Gleeson on a 2-year contract for the 2013–14 and 2014–15 seasons. He scored his first try for Salford in the Magic Weekend fixture against Widnes Vikings on 26 May 2013 at the Etihad Stadium, Manchester.

Gleeson announced his retirement in September 2014.

== Coaching career ==
After retiring as a player, Gleeson remained at Salford in a coaching role. In 2019, he joined the coaching staff at rugby union club Wasps. In 2021, he became the attack coach for the England national rugby union team.

He returned to rugby league in 2023, briefly working as a coach at Featherstone Rovers, before joining Warrington Wolves.

== Personal life ==
Martin Gleeson is the older brother of the rugby league footballer, Mark Gleeson, and the cousin of the rugby league footballer, Sean Gleeson.
