= Brent Grose =

Australian rugby league footballer

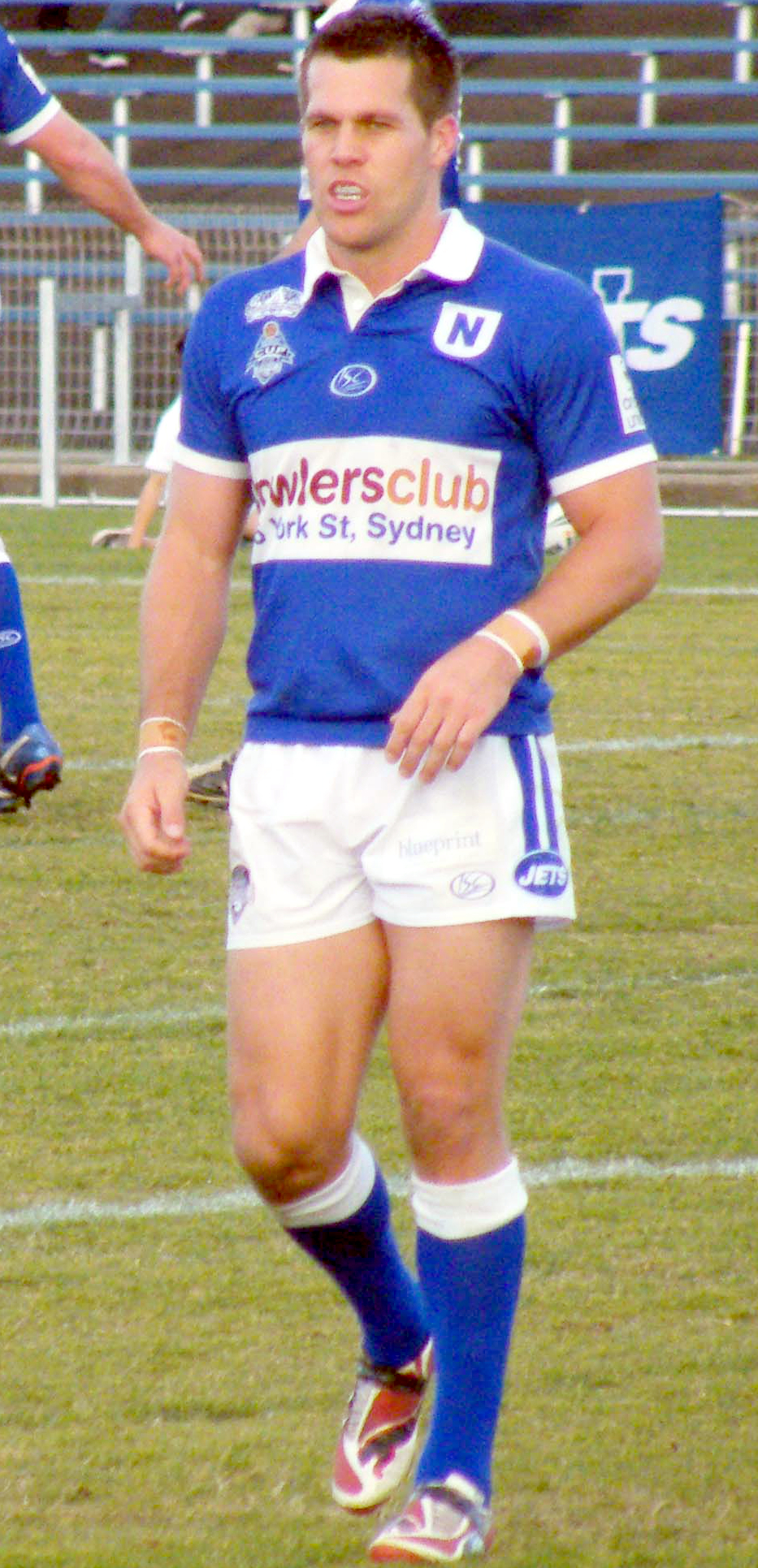

Personal information
- Born: 11 September 1979 (age 46) Bulli, New South Wales, Australia

Playing information
- Height: 182 cm (6 ft 0 in)
- Weight: 109 kg (17 st 2 lb)
- Position: Fullback, Wing, Centre
Club
| Years | Team | Pld | T | G | FG | P |
|---|---|---|---|---|---|---|
| 2001 | Cronulla Sharks | 15 | 5 | 0 | 0 | 20 |
| 2002 | South Sydney | 24 | 9 | 0 | 0 | 36 |
| 2003–07 | Warrington Wolves | 145 | 63 | 0 | 0 | 252 |
| 2008 | Sydney Roosters | 15 | 3 | 0 | 0 | 12 |
| | Total | 199 | 80 | 0 | 0 | 320 |

Brent Grose (born 11 September 1979) is an Australian former professional rugby league footballer who played in the 2000s. He played for the Sydney Roosters of the National Rugby League. He also previously played for the Cronulla-Sutherland Sharks and the South Sydney Rabbitohs. Grose also had an extended stint in the Super League for English club the Warrington Wolves from 2003 to 2007.
