= Henry Fa'afili =

New Zealand and Samoa dual-code international rugby footballer

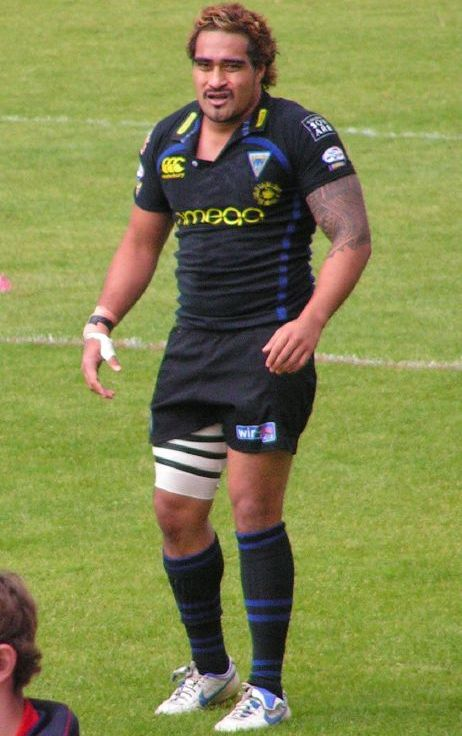

Personal information
- Full name: Henry Aau Fa'afili
- Born: 30 May 1980 (age 46) Moto'otua, Apia, Western Samoa

Playing information
- Height: 1.81 m (5 ft 11 in)
- Weight: 93 kg (14 st 9 lb)

Rugby league
- Position: Wing, Centre, Five-eighth, Second-row
Club
Years	Team	Pld	T	G	FG	P
2000–03	New Zealand Warriors	94	38	0	0	152
2004–07	Warrington Wolves	97	73	0	0	288
	Total	191	111	0	0	440
Representative
Years	Team	Pld	T	G	FG	P
2000	Samoa	4	2	0	0	8
2001–06	New Zealand	9	5	0	0	20

Rugby union
- Position: Centre
Club
Years	Team	Pld	T	G	FG	P
2007–10	Biarritz Olympique	24	8	0	0	0
2010–11	Leeds Carnegie	43	5	0	0	25
2011–12	Connacht Rugby	22	9	0	0	0
	Total	89	22	0	0	25
Representative
Years	Team	Pld	T	G	FG	P
2008–09	Samoa	10	1	0	0	(5)

Henry Fa'afili (born 30 May 1980) is a former professional rugby league and rugby union footballer who played in the 1990s, 2000s and 2010s. He played representative rugby league (RL) for New Zealand Secondary Schools, the New Zealand Junior Kiwis, New Zealand and Samoa, and at club level for Auckland Warriors and the Warrington Wolves, as a wing, centre, stand-off, or second-row, he switched codes in 2007, and played representative rugby union (RU) for Samoa, and at club level for Biarritz Olympique, Leeds Carnegie and Connacht Rugby, as a wing, or centre.

As of 2022, he resides in Tauranga as a head coach and head mentor for a boxing academy for underprivileged boys.

== Early life ==
Fa'afili was born in Apia, Samoa but migrated to New Zealand with his family when he was 3. He was educated at both Manurewa High School and De La Salle College, Mangere East. He represented both the New Zealand Secondary Schools team and the Junior Kiwis in 1998.

== New Zealand Warriors ==
He made his début for the Auckland Warriors in the Australasian National Rugby League in round 8 of the 2000 NRL season against the Sydney Roosters. In the 2001 NRL season, he played 27 games as the newly rebranded New Zealand Warriors side qualified for the finals in what was the first time in their history. He played in the clubs 56-12 qualifying final loss to Parramatta. In 2002, New Zealand claimed the Minor Premiership with Fa'afili playing 17 games. Fa'afili did not play in the clubs 2002 NRL Grand Final loss against the Sydney Roosters. In 2003, New Zealand reached the finals once again but were defeated in the preliminary final against eventual premiers Penrith with Fa'afili playing in this game.

== Warrington Wolves ==
Fa'afili signed for the Warrington Wolves in 2004, and made his début on Sunday 8 August 2004, and whilst at the Warrington Wolves he scored many tries from high cross field kicks from Lee Briers. He scored 73 tries in 97 appearances for the Warrington Wolves. He was the top try-scorer in the Super League for the 2007's Super League XII. He left the Warrington Wolves at the end of 2007 season because of salary cap restraints. Fa'afili played his last match for the Warrington Wolves in the 34–26 victory over the Salford City Reds on Friday 14 September 2007.

== Harlequins Rugby League ==
After scoring 38 tries in 94 games for the Warriors, Fa'afili netted 72 in 92 at the Warrington Wolves and was Super League's top try scorer for the 2007 season, he was signed by Harlequins RL.https://news.bbc.co.uk/sport1/mobile/rugby_league/super_league/london/6980403.stm However he was tapped up to sign for Biarritz and left manager Brian McDermott and chairman Ian Lenagan furious.https://news.bbc.co.uk/sport2/hi/rugby_league/7045072.stm

== Biarritz Olympique ==
Fa'afili agreed what was initially seen as a short-term deal with French rugby union side Biarritz. He was initially meant to play there short-term but ended up staying longer.

== Leeds Carnegie ==
He joined Leeds Carnegie ahead of the 2010–11 English Premiership season but left after one season when the club were relegated.

== Connacht Rugby ==
Henry joined Connacht in the summer of 2011 as part of Head Coach Eric Elwood's squad, joining fellow Samoan Ray Ofisa. He left after one season

== International career ==
Fa'afili has also represented New Zealand in rugby league at international level on several occasions, scoring a hat-trick against Great Britain in 2003 at Ewood Park, Blackburn during the Tri-Nations. His last appearance for New Zealand was against Great Britain in June 2006 at St Helens. He also represented Samoa in the 2000 World Cup. He has also been capped internationally in rugby union for Samoa

== Match Fit ==
In 2023, Fa'afili participated in season 3 of Match Fit, where former rugby players return to play against the Australian counterparts. He joined in the first season that featured former rugby league stars.

He revealed he had undergone double hip replacements, but collapsed after finishing the first Bronco agility test due to breathing difficulties. It was later revealed he was suffering from atrial fibrillation and a precursor to a stroke. He was medically retired from this programme and put on a tailor-made programme away from the cameras to get himself back in relative health.

During the next 11 weeks, he had psychological counselling, but also done the Tauranga Round the Bays 5 km fun run. He even beat Alex Flint, the show's trainer, in terms of heart rate control in the 11-week reassessment. He also managed to half his time on the final Bronco with a time of 6:41, beating Lesley Vanikolo's time of 7:30. On the final episode, however, he revealed that he was declared unfit to play due to risk of cardiac arrest and his lack of full contact training.

In 2024, he was cleared by his cardiologist to return for Match Fit: Union vs. League. While Pita Alatini and Carlos Spencer went -15 for metabolic age vs. biological age for the best possible result, he and Lesley Vanikolo started out +15, which is the worst possible result. He also suffered dizziness before the initial Bronco test, but the tests had shown that due to atrial fibrilation, he can no longer perform at a level required for the show and had to withdraw and rehab again.
