= Terence Seu Seu =

Samoa international rugby league footballer

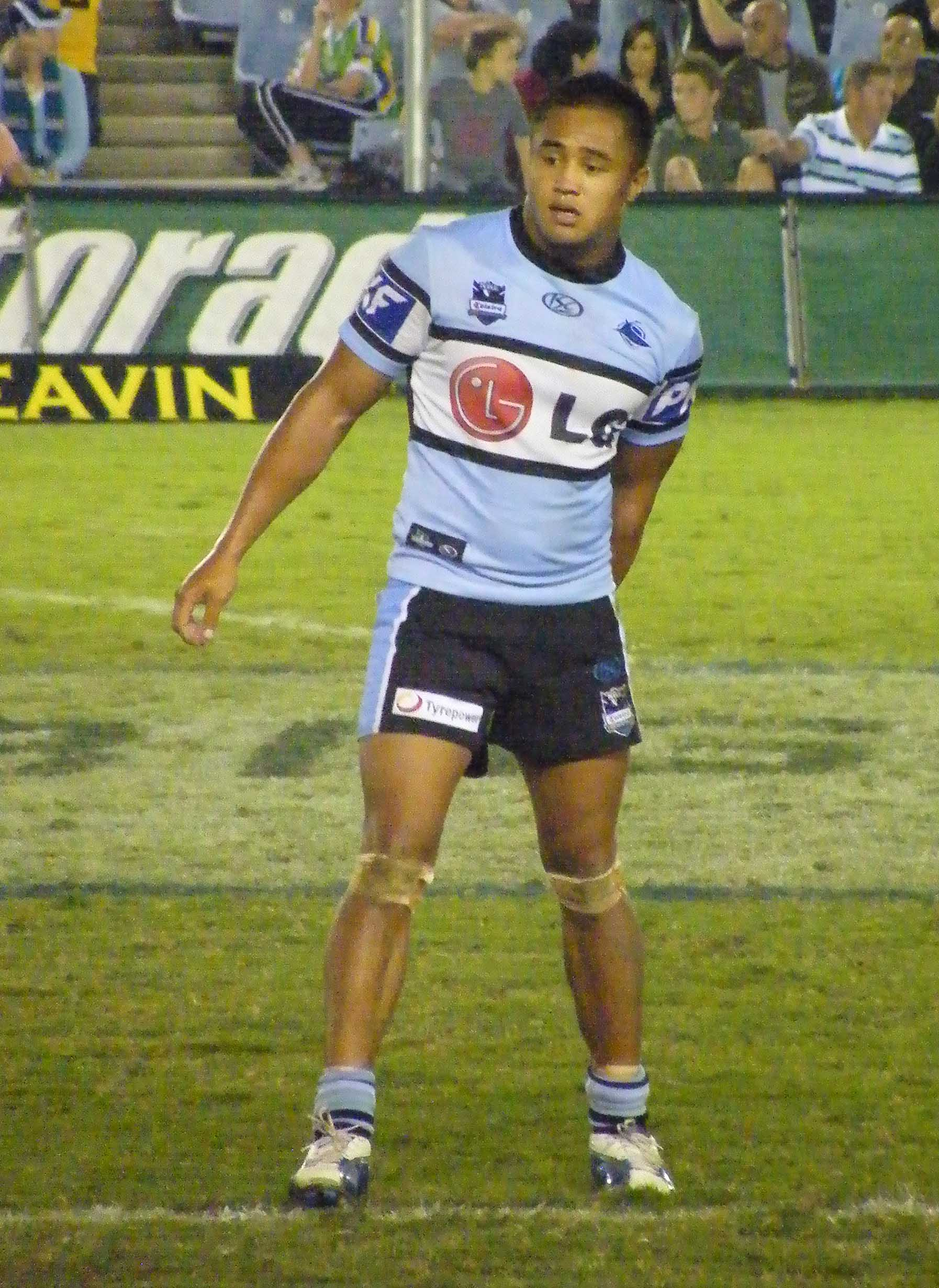

Personal information
- Born: 20 November 1987 (age 38) Auckland, New Zealand
- Height: 179 cm (5 ft 10 in)
- Weight: 90 kg (14 st 2 lb)

Playing information
- Position: Hooker
Club
Years	Team	Pld	T	G	FG	P
2007	Newcastle Knights	10	1	0	0	4
2008–09	Cronulla Sharks	32	1	0	0	4
2010–11	Manly Sea Eagles	9	0	0	0	0
	Total	51	2	0	0	8
Representative
Years	Team	Pld	T	G	FG	P
2008–10	Samoa	4	0	0	0	0
- Source: As of 2 November 2023

Terence Seu Seu (born 20 November 1987) is a New Zealand former rugby league footballer who last played as a hooker in the Newcastle Rugby League competition. He had previously played in the National Rugby League for the Newcastle Knights, the Cronulla-Sutherland Sharks, and the Manly-Warringah Sea Eagles.

== Background ==
Seu Seu was born in Auckland, New Zealand.

== Playing career ==
Seu Seu made his first grade debut in 2007 for the Newcastle Knights against Canterbury at EnergyAustralia Stadium on 18 March, scoring one try in the match. Between 2008 and 2009 he played for the Cronulla-Sutherland Sharks. He joined Manly in 2010. In 2012 Seu Seu played for the Cessnock Goannas in the Newcastle Rugby League competition.

== Representative career ==
Seu Seu was a part of the Samoa squad for the 2008 Rugby League World Cup.

In 2009 he was named as part of the Samoan side for the Pacific Cup.
