= Craig Ashall =

English rugby league footballer

Personal information
- Full name: Craig Ashall
- Born: 26 September 1985 (age 40) England

Playing information
- Height: 180 cm (5 ft 11 in)
- Weight: 89 kg (14 st 0 lb)
- Position: Stand-off
Club
Years	Team	Pld	T	G	FG	P
2006	St. Helens	1	1	0	0	4
2007–09	Swinton Lions	61	15	1	1	63
2010–11	Rochdale Hornets	52	25	2	2	106
2012–13	Halifax	59	24	0	2	98
2014	North Wales Crusaders	15	5	0	0	20
	Total	188	70	3	5	291

Craig Ashall (born 26 September 1985) is a former rugby league footballer who played as a stand-off or loose forward. He played for St Helens, Swinton Lions, Rochdale Hornets, Halifax and North Wales Crusaders.

== Playing career ==
He started his career at St Helens where he made his one and only first-grade appearance against the Catalans Dragons; a game in which St Helens fielded a weakened side in preparation for the 2006 Challenge Cup Final. Ashall scored a try in this 26-22 defeat. He transferred to Swinton in 2006. Ashall also played for the Rochdale Hornets before moving to Halifax. While at Halifax he was joined by his brother Karl Ashall and they then both signed for North Wales for the 2014 season.
