= Paul Wood (rugby league) =

GB & England international rugby league footballer & coach (born 1981)

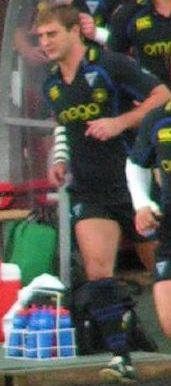

Personal information
- Full name: Paul Wood
- Born: 10 October 1981 (age 44) Wigan, Greater Manchester, England
- Height: 6 ft 0 in (1.83 m)
- Weight: 15 st 10 lb (100 kg)

Playing information
- Position: Prop, Second-row
Club
Years	Team	Pld	T	G	FG	P
2000–14	Warrington Wolves	339	50	0	0	200
2015	Featherstone Rovers	15	0	0	0	0
2018	Swinton Lions	7	1	0	0	4
	Total	361	51	0	0	204
Representative
Years	Team	Pld	T	G	FG	P
2005	England	2	0	0	0	0

Coaching information
Club
Years	Team	Gms	W	D	L	W%
2025–26	Swinton Lions	31	13	0	18	42
- Source: As of 31 March 2026

Paul Wood (born 10 October 1981) is an English former professional rugby league footballer who played as a prop and second-row forward in the 2000s and 2010s. He played for the Warrington Wolves in the Super League, and Featherstone Rovers and the Swinton Lions in the Championship. At international level, he made a non-Test appearance for Great Britain in 2003, and was capped twice by England in 2005. He is the Former head-coach of Swinton Lions, 30/03/2026

== Playing career ==
=== Club career ===
Wood was signed by Warrington Wolves from Ince St Williams in 1999. He made his first team debut in September 2000 against Wakefield Trinity Wildcats.

Wood played in the 2010 Challenge Cup Final victory over the Leeds Rhinos at Wembley Stadium. Wood also played in the 2012 Challenge Cup victory also against Leeds. Wood has continued to feature for Warrington during 2011 but his season ended early due to an injury in the lower back. During his long career at Warrington he has gained a reputation for the hard yards going forward, work rate & offloading.

Wood played in the 2012 Challenge Cup Final victory over Leeds at Wembley Stadium.

Wood played in the 2012 Super League Grand Final defeat against Leeds at Old Trafford During the game Wood ruptured his right testicle after getting kneed in the groin, one minute into the second half. Wood continued to play, made a number of tackles and even conducted media interviews in the dressing room after the match without mentioning it. It became public knowledge only when he tweeted a couple of hours later that he was heading for hospital for surgery and he confirmed early on Sunday morning that his right testicle had been removed. Wood played in the 2013 Super League Grand Final defeat against Wigan at Old Trafford.

Wood joined Featherstone Rovers in 2015. He retired from playing at the end of the season and was hired as a coach at Leigh Centurions. He briefly came out of retirement in 2018 to play for Swinton Lions.

=== Representative honours ===
In 2003, Wood was selected in the Great Britain squad for the upcoming Ashes series. He made his first and only appearance for the team in a non-Test game against a New Zealand 'A' team. He left the game early due to a shoulder injury, which ruled him out of the Test series against Australia. Wood received another Great Britain call-up for the 2006 Tri-Nations as a replacement for the injured James Graham, but made no appearance during the tournament.

He was capped twice by England in 2005, making his debut in a 22–12 win against France.

== Coaching career ==
=== Swinton Lions ===
On 27 Oct 2024 it was reported that he had taken the role of head-coach for Swinton Lions in the RFL League 1 for the 2025 season

On 30 March 2026 it was reported that he had stepped down, with assistant coach Anthony Murray taking over
