= Sean Gleeson (rugby league) =

Ireland international rugby league footballer

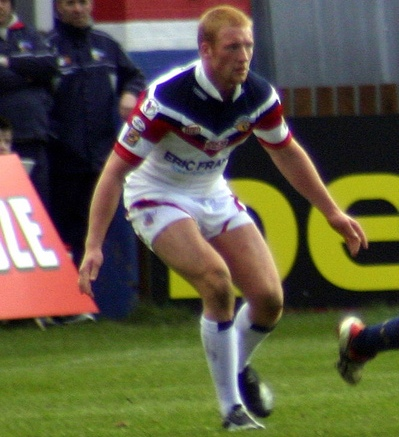

Personal information
- Born: 29 November 1987 (age 38) Wigan, Greater Manchester, England

Playing information
- Height: 184 cm (6 ft 0 in)
- Weight: 91 kg (14 st 5 lb)
- Position: Fullback, Wing, Centre
Club
Years	Team	Pld	T	G	FG	P
2005–07	Wigan Warriors	6	0	0	0	0
2006(loan)	→ Widnes Vikings	6	0	0	0	0
2007–10	Wakefield Trinity Wildcats	78	24	0	0	96
2011–12	Salford City Reds	38	14	0	0	56
2013–14	Hull Kingston Rovers	6	0	0	0	0
	Total	134	38	0	0	152
Representative
Years	Team	Pld	T	G	FG	P
2007–08	Ireland	5	3	0	0	12
- Relatives: Martin Gleeson (cousin); Mark Gleeson (cousin)

Sean Gleeson (born 29 November 1987) is a former Ireland international rugby league footballer who played in the 2000s and 2010s. He played at club level for the Wigan Warriors, Widnes Vikings (loan), Wakefield Trinity Wildcats and the Salford City Reds in the Super League as a fullback, wing or centre.

== Background ==
Gleeson was born in Wigan, Greater Manchester, England.

Sean Gleeson is the cousin of the rugby league footballer Martin Gleeson, and the rugby league footballer Mark Gleeson.

== Career ==
He came in to the Wigan side due to injury, and was then loaned out to Widnes Vikings.

Gleeson was named in the Ireland squad for the 2008 Rugby League World Cup.

It was announced on 11 June 2012 that Sean Gleeson will move to Hull KR for the 2013 season. On 8 January 2013 it emerged that his start to the season might be delayed due to a back injury sustained in training.

In March 2014, Gleeson was taken to hospital with a serious eye injury after being assaulted outside a nightclub in his hometown. On 2 June 2014 he announced that he was to quit Rugby League at the age of 26 due to the injury.
