= Mark Gleeson =

English rugby league footballer

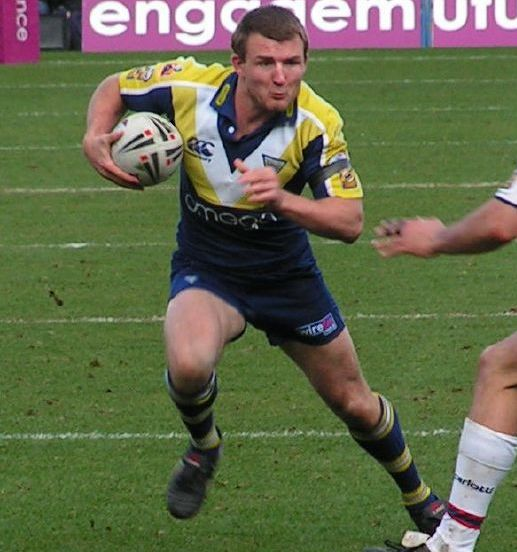
- Gleeson playing for Warrington in 2007

Personal information
- Born: 16 July 1982 (age 43) Wigan, Greater Manchester, England
- Height: 5 ft 9 in (1.75 m)
- Weight: 12 st 10 lb (81 kg)

Playing information
- Position: Hooker
Club
Years	Team	Pld	T	G	FG	P
2000–08	Warrington Wolves	141	12	0	0	48
2008–10	Halifax	43	12	0	0	48
2011	Barrow Raiders	23	3	0	0	12
	Total	207	27	0	0	108
Representative
Years	Team	Pld	T	G	FG	P
2005	England	1	0	0	0	0
- Source: As of 23 May 2016
- Relatives: Martin Gleeson (brother); Sean Gleeson (cousin)

Mark Gleeson (born 16 July 1982) is an English former professional rugby league footballer who played in the 2000s and 2010s. He was contracted to Halifax until the end of the National League One 2008 season.

Mark Gleeson was born in Wigan, Greater Manchester, England, and like his brother Martin, he spent seven years of his junior career in Australia after emigrating with his family aged 8, and later signed for the Warrington Wolves Academy, featuring in their 1999 under-19 Grand Final team against Leeds Rhinos, he briefly returned to Australia to play in Cairns, Queensland.

Gleeson won Sky's Man of the Match award on full début against champions the Bradford Bulls in 2001. Gleeson re-signed for the Warrington Wolves when Paul Cullen took over as coach in time for the 2003's Super League VIII. He made his England début against France at Headingley in 2005.

In July 2008, Mark was released from his contract at the Warrington Wolves, and opted to sign for National League One side Halifax, after his contract with Featherstone Rovers fell through.

On 14 August 2008, one month after Gleeson signed for Halifax, he signed a new and improved contract until the end of the 2009 season.

== Genealogical information ==
Mark Gleeson is the younger brother of the rugby league footballer; Martin Gleeson, and the cousin of the rugby league footballer; Sean Gleeson.
