= Lee Briers =

Former Great Britain and Wales international rugby league footballer

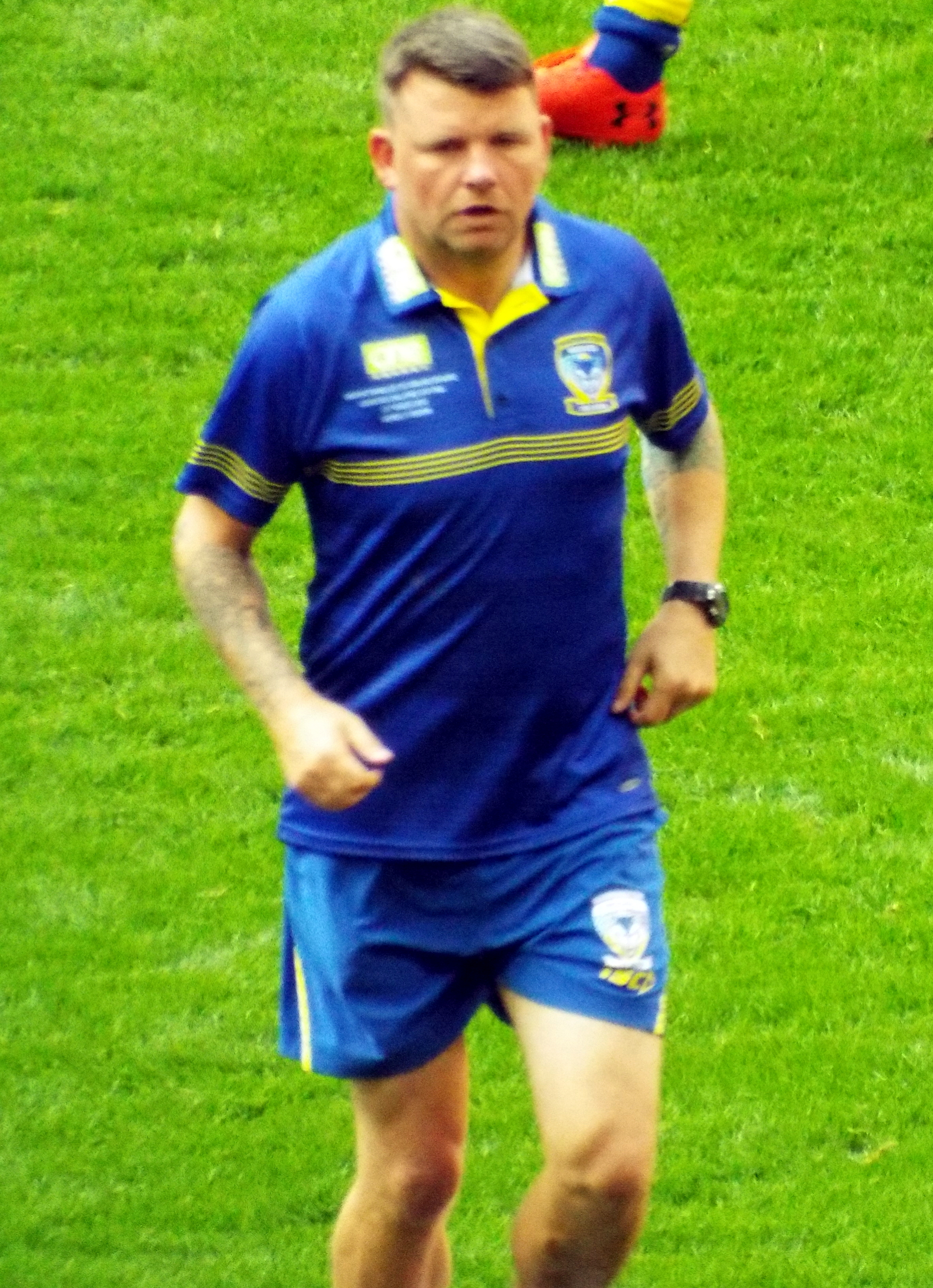

Personal information
- Full name: Lee Paul Briers
- Born: 14 June 1978 (age 48) St Helens, England

Playing information
- Height: 5 ft 11 in (1.80 m)
- Weight: 13 st 1 lb (83 kg)
- Position: Scrum-half, Stand-off
Club
Years	Team	Pld	T	G	FG	P
1997	St Helens	6	1	24	0	52
1996–97(loan)	→AS Carcassonne
1998–13	Warrington Wolves	425	154	948	74	2586
2013(DR)	→Swinton Lions	1	1	0	0	4
	Total	432	156	972	74	2642
Representative
Years	Team	Pld	T	G	FG	P
1998–11	Wales	23	9	29	6	100
2001	Great Britain	1	0	1	0	6
2001–02	Lancashire	2	0	0	0	0

Lee Paul Briers (born 14 June 1978) is a professional rugby league coach who is a development coach at St Helens in the Super League and assistant coach of the England national team.

A former Great Britain and Wales international, he played the majority of his career at Warrington Wolves in the Super League as a stand-off or scrum-half. He won three Challenge Cup finals during his time at the club.

== Club career ==
Widnes vikings (1996) Played with Stuart Johnson

=== St Helens (1997) ===
==== Loan to Carcassonne (1996–97) ====
Briers' first experience of first team rugby was on loan at AS Carcassonne for the 1996–97 French Rugby League Championship season. While at home for Christmas leave, he played a friendly for St Helens in their Boxing Day Challenge Match against Wigan Warriors.

==== Return to parent club ====
Briers made his competitive St. Helens on 8 February 1997 in the fourth round match of the 1997 Challenge Cup game against Wigan at the age of 18, standing in for suspended captain Bobbie Goulding after an emergency player recal from his loan at Carcassonne. Saints won the game 28–12.

From his debut to April of the 1997 season, Briers made six appearances for St Helens, scoring one try and 24 goals. He was dropped from the starting line-up following the return of Goulding.

=== Warrington (1997–2013) ===
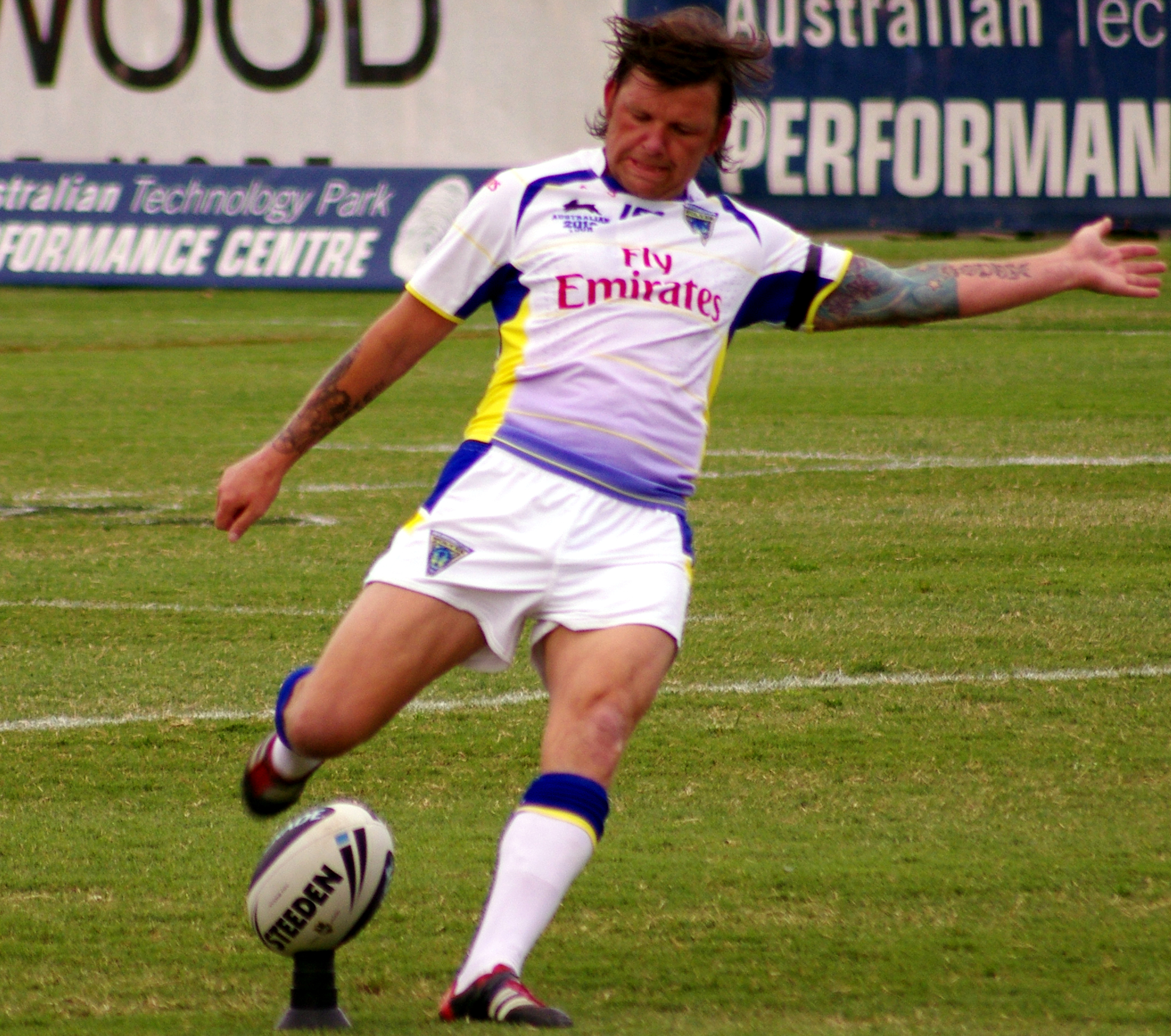
Beiers taking a conversion for Warrington in 2012

Briers signed for Warrington Wolves in April 1997 for a fee of £65,000, declining a three-year deal from AS Carcassonne in the process. He was named Young Player of the Year in his first season at Wilderspool Stadium.

Briers was named as captain in 2003 and became known for his excellent kicking skills and his ability to successfully convert drop goals. He currently holds the Super League record, and jointly Warrington all-time record (with Paul Bishop), for the most drop goals in a game (5 against Halifax at the Shay in 2002).

Briers' testimonial match at Warrington took place in 2007. He stepped down as captain at the end of the 2007 season.

Briers played in the 2010 Challenge Cup Final victory over the Leeds Rhinos at Wembley Stadium.

The 2011 Super League season was Briers' 14th. During this season he broke a number of club records including top all-time points scorer, having overtaken club greats Brian Bevan, and Steve Hesford. He broke the record during a Challenge Cup home 112–0 demolition of Swinton. This match also saw Briers break his own club record for points in a match (set 11 years earlier against York), with 44 points, from 16 goals and three tries.

He played in the 2012 Challenge Cup Final victory over the Leeds Rhinos at Wembley Stadium.

He played in the 2012 Super League Grand Final defeat by the Leeds Rhinos at Old Trafford.

In 2013, during the second match of the season against Wigan Warriors, Lee suffered a neck injury which saw him sidelined for 13 games. He returned for Warrington's Challenge Cup fifth round tie against Salford City Reds in which he made scored one try and kicked his 1,000th career goal.

He played in the 2013 Super League Grand Final defeat by the Wigan Warriors at Old Trafford.

In November 2013, although Briers had a year remaining on his contract, he announced his retirement due to a neck injury. He played 425 games for Warrington, scoring a club record 2,586 points. Shortly before announcing his retirement, Briers released his autobiography, Off the Cuff.

In 2018, Briers was inducted into Warrington's Hall of Fame.

== International career ==
Having made his Wales début in 1998, Briers went on to make 23 appearances for his country and featured in the 2000 Rugby League World Cup. Briers was capped by Great Britain against France in their 42–12 win on 26 October 2001.

Following the Wales team's failure to qualify for the 2008 Rugby League World Cup, Briers announced his international retirement.

Briers came out of international retirement to represent Wales in the 2010 European Cup, and captained the side to victory in the tournament. He went on to captain Wales in the 2011 Four Nations, before once again retiring from international rugby league at the tournament's end.

== Coaching career ==
Following his retirement as a player, Briers became a youth coach at Warrington Wolves before being promoted to Assistant First Team Head Coach in 2018. In 2021 he was signed by Wigan Warriors as an Assistant Coach following the sacking of Adrian Lam. Briers stayed for one season in which Wigan won the 2022 Challenge Cup. He was signed by Brisbane Broncos as a Development Coach ahead of the 2023 season. Following the 2023 NRL Grand Final, in which Brisbane finished runners-up, Briers was appointed Assistant Coach of the England national team ahead of the 2023 Tonga tour of England in addition to his role at Brisbane. Briers was not released by Brisbane for England's 2024 mid-season friendly against France. In the summer of 2026, Briers announced his decision to leave St Helens to 'explore another opportunity'.
