= 2006 Hull Kingston Rovers season =

English rugby league team season

Hull Kingston Rovers 2006 season
- 2006 National League One champions
- National League One Rank: 1st
- Play-off result: Winners
- Challenge Cup: Semi-finals
- National League Cup: Runners-up
- 2006 record: Wins: 29; draws: 0; losses: 4
- Points scored: For: 705; against: 338

Team information
- Chairman: Neil Hudgell
- Head Coach: Justin Morgan
- Captain: James Webster
- Stadium: Craven Park
- Avg. attendance: 4,049
- High attendance: 7,012; Warrington Wolves, 4 June
- Low attendance: 1,748; York Acorn, 12 March

Top scorers
- Tries: Ben Cockayne (17)
- Goals: Gareth Morton (59)
- Points: Gareth Morton (146)
← 2005	List of seasons	2007 →

The 2006 season was Hull Kingston Rovers' ninth consecutive season playing in England's second tier of rugby league. During the season, they competed in the 2006 National League Cup, the 2006 National League One season, and the 2006 Challenge Cup.

2006 was Hull Kingston Rovers' first season in which they fielded a squad of fully professional players, funded by sponsorships from companies such as Lloyds TSB. The club's victory in the National League One final against Widnes Vikings resulted in their promotion to the Super League, marking Hull Kingston Rovers' return to top-flight rugby league for the first time in 20 years.

== Preseason friendlies ==
Date and time	Versus	H/A	Venue	Result	Score	Tries	Goals	Attendance	Report
8 January (Note: Clive Sullivan Memorial Trophy)	Hull F.C.	A	KC Stadium	L	6–34	Goddard	Morton (1/1)	12,737	
22 January	Sheffield Eagles	A	Don Valley Stadium	W	44–24	Ford (2), Goddard, Garmston, Rivett, Murrell, Walker, Williams	Morton (2/4), Couturier (4/4)	1,164	
27 January (Note: Robbie Hunter-Paul testimonial match)	Bradford Bulls	A	Odsal Stadium	L	12–28	Murrell, Cockayne	Morton (2/2)	5,800	
5 February	Gateshead Thunder	A	Gateshead International Stadium	L	10–28	K. Welham, Brett	Skelton (1/2)	287	

== National League Cup ==
Hull Kingston Rovers, defending champions of the 2005 cup, were drawn into Group 6 of the 2006 National League Cup:

Date and time	Round	Versus	H/A	Venue	Result	Score	Tries	Goals	Attendance	TV	Report
12 February; 16:00	Round 1	York City Knights	A	Huntington Stadium	W	32–2	Morrison, Ford, Murrell, Fisher, Smith	Morton (1/1), Murrell (1/1), Couturier (3/3)	2,809	Not televised	
19 February	Round 2	Featherstone Rovers	A (Note: Venue switched to Featherstone due to newly-laid pitch at Craven Park.)	Post Office Road	W	32–6	Cockayne (2), Murrell (2), Smith	Morton (4/4), Couturier (2/3)	2,046	Not televised	
24 February	Round 3	Sheffield Eagles	A	Don Valley Stadium	W	44–22	Cockayne (2), Steel (2), Gallagher, Barker, Ford, Goddard	Couturier (5/7), Morton (1/2)	1,347	Not televised	
5 March	Round 4	Featherstone Rovers	H	Craven Park	W	50–18	Couturier (3), Goddard, Williams, Morton, Webster, Tangata-Toa, Murrell	Morton (5/6), Couturier (2/3)	3,130	Not televised	
19 March	Round 5	York City Knights	H	Craven Park	W	52–14	Ford (5), Smith (2), Joseph, Steel, Fisher	Morton (1/2), Couturier (4/6), Murrell (1/3)	2,649	Not televised	
26 March	Round 6	Sheffield Eagles	H	Craven Park	W	52–12	Ford (4), Morrison, Gallagher, Couturier, Goddard, Murrell	Couturier (7/8), Murrell (1/1)	2,314	Not televised	
23 April	Round of 16	Halifax R.L.F.C.	H	Craven Park	W	88–6	Steel (2), Ford (2), Smith (2), Goddard (2), Aizue (2), Couturier (2), Barker, Joseph, Morton	Couturier (14/15) (Note: Until the record was broken by Rhyse Martin in 2026, Couturier's goals during this fixture tied him alongside Alf Carmichael, Mike Fletcher and Colin Armstrong as Hull Kingston Rovers' highest goal scorer in a single fixture.)	2,306	Not televised	
7 May	Quarter-finals	Whitehaven R.L.F.C.	H	Craven Park	W	37–10	Morton (2), Tangata-Toa, Gallagher, Cockayne, Steel	Morton (6/7); Drop goals Murrell	2,366	Not televised	
18 June	Semi-finals	Doncaster Lakers	H	Craven Park	W	38–6	Ford (2), Morrison, Gallagher, Webster, Cockayne	Morton (6/6), Couturier (1/1)	3,016	Not televised	
16 July	Final	Leigh Centurions	N	Bloomfield Road	L	18–22	Goddard, Ford, Cockayne	Morton (2/3 + 1 pen.)	7,547	Sky Sports 2	

== National League One ==
=== Fixtures ===
Date and time	Round	Versus	H/A	Venue	Result	Score	Tries	Goals	Attendance	Pos.	Report
9 April	Round 1	Oldham Roughyeds	A	Boundary Park	W	48–8	Webster (3), Murrell (2), Couturier, Gallagher, Cockayne, Rivett	Couturier (6/9)	1,658	1st	
14 April	Round 2	York City Knights	A	Huntington Stadium	W	51–18	Couturier (2), Smith, Steel, Webster, Aizue, Rivett, Cockayne, Goddard	Couturier (7/9); Drop goals Webster	2,822	2nd	
17 April	Round 3	Leigh Centurions	H	Craven Park	W	30–6	Goddard, Rivett, Steel, Murrell, Fisher, Joseph	Couturier (2/6); Drop goals Webster (2)	4,647	1st	
30 April	Round 4	Halifax R.L.F.C.	H	Craven Park	W	30–22	Cockayne (2), Netherton, Gallagher, Goddard	Couturier (5/5)	3,045	1st	
14 May	Round 5	Widnes Vikings	A	Halton Stadium	W	42–28	Cockayne (2), Gallagher (2), Morton, Murrell, Webster, Goddard, Morton	Morton (7/8)	4,331	1st	
28 May	Round 6	Oldham Roughyeds	H	Craven Park	W	80–6	Steel (3), Smith (2), Martins, Gallagher, Webster, Murrell, Ford, Joseph, Price	Morton (12/14)	2,859	1st	
7 June	Round 7	Doncaster Lakers	A	Belle Vue	W	28–24	Ellis, Goddard, Murrell, Gallagher, Webster	Murrell (3/6 + 1 pen.)	2,190	1st	
11 June	Round 8	Whitehaven R.L.F.C.	H	Craven Park	W	74–12	Fisher (3), Morton (3), Steel (3), Cockayne (2), Joseph, Rivett	Morton (11/14)	3,151	1st	
25 June; 12:45 (Note: Kick-off changed to 12:45 to prevent clashing with England vs Ecuador World Cup fixture.)	Round 9	Rochdale Hornets	A	Spotland Stadium	W	66–16	Cockayne (3), Ford (2), Tangata-Toa (2), Aizue, Murrell, Joseph, Morrison, Morton	Morton (9/12)	1,131	1st	
2 July	Round 10	Batley Bulldogs	H	Craven Park	W	42–8	Ford (3), Webster, Morton, Murrell, Cockayne, Rivett	Morton (3/5), Couturier (2/3)	3,013	1st	
9 July	Round 11	Halifax R.L.F.C.	A	The Shay	W	38–14	Gallagher (2), Goddard (2), Webster, Fisher, Ford	Morton (5/8), Couturier (0/1)	2,106	1st	
23 July	Round 12	Widnes Vikings	H	Craven Park	W	49–24	Steel (2), Webster (2), Netherton (2), Cockayne, Goddard, Whittle	Couturier (4/5), Morton (2/5); Drop goals Webster	4,128	1st	
2 August	Round 13	York City Knights	H	Craven Park	W	21–10	Aizue, Cockayne, Fisher, Steel	Brooks (1/1), Weisner (1/3)	3,036	1st	
6 August	Round 14	Leigh Centurions	A	Hilton Park	L	10–36	K. Welham, Joseph	Couturier (1/2)	2,810	1st	
13 August	Round 15	Rochdale Hornets	H	Craven Park	W	26–12	Cockayne, Gallagher, Goddard, Webster, Smith	Weisner (3/5)	3,111	1st	
20 August	Round 16	Whitehaven R.L.F.C.	A	Recreation Ground	L	12–48	Brooks, Ellis	Couturier (2/2)	2,063	1st	
3 September	Round 17	Batley Bulldogs	A	Mount Pleasant	W	28–24	Ford (2), Webster, Steel, Weisner	Couturier (4/5)	2,027	1st	
10 September	Round 18	Doncaster Lakers	H	Craven Park	W	30–22	Ford (2), Smith, Tangata-Toa, Cockayne	Couturier (3/5 + 2 pen.)	3,631	1st	

=== Table ===
Pos	Club	Pld	W	D	L	Pts for	Pts agst	Pts	Qualification
1	Hull Kingston Rovers	18	16	0	2	705	338	32	Play-off Semi-final
2	Widnes Vikings	18	14	0	4	729	449	28	Play-off Semi-final
3	Leigh Centurions	18	13	0	5	549	334	26	Elimination Finals
4	Whitehaven	18	12	1	5	516	408	25	Elimination Finals
5	Rochdale Hornets	18	8	0	10	462	435	16	Elimination Finals
6	Batley Bulldogs	18	8	0	10	393	467	16	Elimination Finals
7	Halifax	18	7	0	11	461	508	14	
8	Doncaster	18	6	1	11	458	533	13	
9	York City Knights	18	5	0	13	476	553	10	Relegated to National League Two
10	Oldham	18	0	0	18	220	944	0	Relegated to National League Two

=== Play-offs ===
Date and time	Round	Versus	H/A	Venue	Result	Score	Tries	Goals	Attendance	Report
24 September; 15:00	Semi-finals	Widnes Vikings	H	Craven Park	W	29–22	Aizue, Steel, Cockayne, Fisher	Morton (4/4 + 2 pen.); Drop goals Murrell	6,872	
8 October, 15:00	Final	Widnes Vikings	N	Halliwell Jones Stadium	W	29–16	Goddard (2), Ford, Murrell, Weisner	Morton (4/5); Drop goals Murrell	13,024	

== Challenge Cup ==
Date and time	Round	Versus	H/A	Venue	Result	Score	Tries	Goals	Attendance	TV	Report
12 March	Round 3	York Acorn	H	Craven Park	W	62–1	Goddard (3), Morton (3), Rivett (2), Smith (2), Fisher, Gallagher	Morton (6/9), Couturier (1/3)	1,748	Not televised	
2 April; 15:30	Round 4	Hunslet R.L.F.C.	A	South Leeds Stadium	W	22–0	Cockayne, Rivett, Fisher, Stephenson	Couturier (3/4)	1,259	Not televised	
21 May; 15:30	Round 5	Featherstone Rovers	H	Craven Park	W	44–12	Fisher, Netherton, Barker, Murrell, Rivett, Smith, Goddard, Cockayne	Couturier (3/4), Murrell (3/3), Smith (0/1)	2,432	Not televised	
4 June; 14:05	Quarter-finals	Warrington Wolves	H	Craven Park	W	40–36	Ford (3), Cockayne, Aizue, Goddard, Morton, Barker	Morton (4/9)	7,012	BBC Two	
29 June; 12:30	Semi-finals	St Helens	N	Kirklees Stadium	L	0–50			12,868	BBC One	

== Transfers ==
=== Gains ===
Player	Club	Contract	Date
(England) Ben Cockayne	Doncaster Lakers		2005
(Scotland) Ben Fisher	Halifax R.L.F.C.		2005
(England) Jon Goddard	Oldham Roughyeds		2005
(England) Kirk Netherton	Doncaster Lakers		2005
(Wales) Gareth Price	Rochdale Hornets	1 year	2005
(England) Desi Williams	Wigan Warriors	1 year	September 2005
(Scotland) Iain Morrison	Huddersfield Giants		October 2005
(England) Francis Stephenson	London Broncos	2 years	October 2005
(Wales) Phil Joseph	Swinton Lions		October 2005
(England) Scott Murrell	Leeds Rhinos		December 2005

==== Loans in ====
Player	Club	Loan period	Date
(France) Sébastien Martins	Catalans Dragons	One month	May 2006
(England) Jon Whittle	Castleford Tigers	End of season	July 2006
(England) Matty Brooks	Bradford Bulls	One month	July 2006
(Ireland) Pat Weisner	Harlequins RL	End of season	July 2006

=== Losses ===
Player	Club	Contract	Date
(England) Dale Holdstock	Sheffield Eagles		2005
(England) Andy Raleigh	Huddersfield Giants	2 years	September 2005
(England) Paul Fletcher	Sheffield Eagles	1 year	September 2005
(England) Phil Hasty	York City Knights		September 2005
(Cook Islands) Kane Epati	Doncaster Lakers		September 2005
(England) Paul Pickering	Sheffield Eagles		September 2005
(England) Loz Wildbore	Doncaster Lakers		September 2005
(England) Mark Blanchard	York City Knights		October 2005
(England) Jamie Bovill	York City Knights	Part-time	November 2005
(England) Alasdair McClarron	Sheffield Eagles		January 2006

==== Loans out ====
Player	Club	Loan period	Date
(Wales) Phil Joseph	Celtic Crusaders	End of season	July 2006

== Squad ==
2006 Hull Kingston Rovers Squad
First team squad			Coaching staff
(Papua New Guinea) Makali Aizue – PR; (England) Dwayne Barker – SR; (England) Aaron Bradley; (England) Matty Brooks (gk); (France) Damien Couturier – CE (gk); (England) Ben Cockayne – FB; (England) Andy Ellis – HK; (England) Ryan Esders; (England) John Fallon – HK; (Scotland) Ben Fisher – HK; (Australia) Byron Ford – WG; (England) Tommy Gallagher – LF	(England) James Garmston – PR; (England) Jon Goddard – PR; (Wales) Phil Joseph – LF; (France) Sébastien Martins – SR; (Scotland) Iain Morrison – SR; (Scotland) Gareth Morton – CE (gk); (England) Scott Murrell – SO (gk); (England) Jason Netherton – SR; (England) Kirk Netherton; (England) Paul Parker – CE; (Wales) Gareth Price – PR; (England) Leroy Rivett – WG	(New Zealand) Michael Smith – SR (gk); (Scotland) Jon Steel – WG; (England) Francis Stephenson – PR; (Australia) David Tangata-Toa – PR; (England) Jimmy Walker – SH; (Australia) James Webster (c) – SH (gk); (Ireland) Pat Weisner (gk); (England) Kris Welham; (England) Liam Welham; (England) Jon Whittle; (England) Desi Williams – LF; (England) Dave Wilson	Head coach: (Australia) Justin Morgan; Assistant coach: (England) Dean Sampson; Legend: (c) Captain(s); (vc) Vice-captain(s); (gk) = Goal kicker; Updated: 17 January 2006; Source(s): First team, Coaching staff
