= 2007 Hull Kingston Rovers season =

English rugby league team season

Hull Kingston Rovers 2007 season
- Super League XII Rank: 11th
- Play-off result: Did not qualify
- Challenge Cup: Fourth round
- 2007 record: Wins: 10; draws: 0; losses: 18
- Points scored: For: 491; against: 723

Team information
- Chairman: Neil Hudgell
- Head coach: Justin Morgan
- Captain: James Webster
- Stadium: Craven Park
- Avg. attendance: 7,160

Top scorers
- Tries: Luke Dyer (13)
- Goals: Paul Cooke (36)
- Points: Paul Cooke (78)
← 2006	List of seasons	2008 →

The 2007 season was Hull Kingston Rovers' first consecutive season playing in England's top division of rugby league since 1987, following promotion from National League One in 2006. They competed in the 2007 Super League season and the 2007 Challenge Cup.

== Super League ==
=== Fixtures ===
Date and time	Round	Versus	H/A	Venue	Result	Score	Tries	Goals	Attendance	TV	Pos.	Report
10 February; 16:00	Round 1	Wakefield Trinity Wildcats	H	Craven Park	W	14–9	Murrell, Cockayne	Morton (2/2 + 1 pen.)	7,154	Sky Sports 1	4th	
18 February; 15:00	Round 2	Huddersfield Giants	A	Kirklees Stadium	W	17–10	Murrell, Cockayne	Morton (2/2 + 2 pen.); Drop-goals: Webster	7,700	Not televised	2nd	
25 February; 15:00	Round 3	Harlequins RL	H	Craven Park	L	10–26	Dyer, Smith	Morton (1/2)	7,056	Not televised	2nd	
2 March; 20:00	Round 4	Wigan Warriors	A	JJB Stadium	W	26–16	Ford (2), Fisher, Dyer, Morton	Morton (3/6 + 1 pen.)	15,178	Not televised	3rd	
10 March; 18:00	Round 5	Leeds Rhinos	H	Craven Park	W	22–20	Webster, Dyer, Bauer	Morton (3/3 + 2 pen.)	8,086	Sky Sports 1	4th	
18 March; 15:00	Round 6	Warrington Wolves	A	Halliwell Jones Stadium	L	12–30	J. Netherton, Ford	Morton (2/2)	10,030	Not televised	7th	
23 March; 20:00	Round 7	St Helens R.F.C.	A	Knowsley Road	L	14–42	Steel, Ford, Morton	Morton (1/2), Murrell (0/1)	10,523	Not televised	7th	
6 April; 15:00	Round 8	Catalans Dragons	H	Craven Park	L	20–34	Gene, Ford, Murrell, Dyer	Morton (2/4)	6,701	Not televised	9th	
9 April; 12:30 (Easter Monday) (Note: Following this fixture, the Easter derby was moved to its traditional Good Friday slot.)	Round 9	Hull F.C.	A	KC Stadium	L	14–22	Dyer, Tangata-Toa, Bauer	Murrell (1/3)	23,002	Sky Sports 1	10th	
15 April; 15:00	Round 10	Bradford Bulls	A	Odsal Stadium	L	22–52	Steel, Gene, Tangata-Toa, Dyer	Murrell (3/4)	10,881	Not televised	10th	
22 April; 15:00	Round 11	Salford City Reds	H	Craven Park	L	24–28	Gannon, O'Neill, Lennon, Goddard, Bauer	Morton (2/5)	6,299	Not televised	11th	
27 April; 20:00	Round 12	Huddersfield Giants	H	Craven Park	L	16–28	Bauer, Gene	Cooke (2/2 + 2 pen.)	6,597	Sky Sports 1	11th	
5 May; 17:00	Round 13 (Millennium Magic)	Hull F.C.	N	Millennium Stadium	W	14–10	Aizue, Cockayne	Cooke (2/2 + 1 pen.)	32,384	Sky Sports 2	11th	
18 May; 20:00	Round 14	Wigan Warriors	A	JJB Stadium	W	12–10	Dyer, Hardman	Cooke (2/2)	13,538	Not televised	10th	
27 May; 15:00	Round 15	Leeds Rhinos	H	Craven Park	L	10–18	J. Netherton	Cooke (1/1 + 2 pen.)	7,731	Not televised	11th	
3 June; 18:00	Round 16	Wakefield Trinity Wildcats	A	Belle Vue	L	15–30	Dyer, Ford, Hardman	Cooke (1/1); Drop-goals: Cooke	6,107	Sky Sports 2	11th	
17 June; 15:00	Round 17	St Helens	H	Craven Park	L	0–40			7,011	Not televised	11th	
30 June; 13:30	Round 18	Harlequins RL	A	Twickenham Stoop	L	18–23	Tandy, Lennon, Chester	Cooke (3/3)	3,278	Not televised	11th	
8 July; 13:00	Round 19 (Note: Hull Kingston Rovers were fined £7,500 and made to pay legal costs following a post-full time pitch invasion that resulted in four arrests and Hull F.C. centre Kirk Yeaman being headbutted.)	Hull F.C.	H	Craven Park	L	20–30	Dyer, Tangata-Toa, O'Neill, Lovegrove	Cooke (2/4)	9,035	Not televised	11th	
14 July; 18:00 (BST)	Round 20	Catalans Dragons	A	Stade Gilbert Brutus	W	22–20	Lennon, Gene, Hardman, O'Neill	Lennon (3/4)	7,830	Not televised	11th	
22 July; 15:00	Round 21	Warrington Wolves	H	Craven Park	L	20–60	Hardman, Fisher, Aizue, Morton	Lennon (2/4)	6,640	Not televised	10th	
3 August; 20:00	Round 22	Salford City Reds	A	The Willows	W	30–24	O'Neill (2), Cooke, Lennon, Dyer	Cooke (5/7)	7,165	Sky Sports 3	10th	
12 August; 15:00	Round 23	Bradford Bulls	H	Craven Park	L	10–28	Goddard, Fisher	Cooke (1/2)	6,695	Not televised	11th	
17 August; 20:00	Round 24	Leeds Rhinos	A	Headingley Rugby Stadium	L	18–34	Lovegrove, Dyer, Tandy	Cooke (3/3)	17,389	Not televised	11th	
2 September; 12:30	Round 25	Hull F.C.	A	KC Stadium	W	42–6	Dyer (2), Lovegrove (2), J. Netherton, Lennon, Webster, Gene	Cooke (5/8)	23,004	Not televised	11th	
9 September; 15:00	Round 26	Wigan Warriors	H	Craven Park	L	24–40	Welham, Lovegrove, Murrell, Bauer, Morrison	Lennon (2/2), Cooke (0/3)	7,370	Not televised	10th	
15 September; 19:00	Round 27	Huddersfield Giants	H	Craven Park	W	25–24	Fisher (2), Vella, Chester	Cooke (4/4); Drop-goals: Cooke	6,700	Sky Sports Xtra	11th	

=== Table ===
Pos	Team	Pld	W	D	L	PF	PA	PD	Pts	Qualification
1	St Helens (L)	27	19	0	8	783	422	+361	38	Semifinal
2	Leeds Rhinos (C)	27	18	1	8	747	487	+260	37	Semifinal
3	Bradford Bulls	27	17	1	9	778	560	+218	33 (Note: Bradford deducted 2 points for salary cap breaches.)	Elimination semifinal
4	Hull F.C.	27	14	2	11	573	553	+20	30	Elimination semifinal
5	Huddersfield Giants	27	13	1	13	638	543	+95	27	Elimination semifinal
6	Wigan Warriors	27	15	1	11	621	527	+94	27 (Note: Wigan deducted 4 points for salary cap breaches.)	Elimination semifinal
7	Warrington Wolves	27	13	0	14	693	736	−43	26	
8	Wakefield Trinity Wildcats	27	11	1	15	596	714	−118	23	
9	Harlequins	27	10	3	14	495	636	−141	23	
10	Catalans Dragons	27	10	1	16	570	685	−115	21	
11	Hull Kingston Rovers	27	10	0	17	491	723	−232	20	
12	Salford City Reds (R)	27	6	1	20	475	874	−399	13	Relegation to National League One

Source: Rugby League Project
Rules for classification: 1) Points; 2) Points difference; 3) Number of points scored;
(C) Champions; (L) League Leaders' Shield Winners; (R) Relegated

== Challenge Cup ==
Date and time	Round	Versus	H/A	Venue	Result	Score	Tries	Goals	Attendance	TV	Report
31 March; 15:00	Round 4	Warrington Wolves	A	Halliwell Jones Stadium	L	10–38	Tangata-Toa, K. Netherton	Morton (1/2)	4,523	Not televised	

== Transfers ==
=== Gains ===
Player	Club	Contract	Date
(Wales) Luke Dyer	Castleford Tigers		2006
(England) Danny Ward	Castleford Tigers		2006
(Samoa) Andreas Bauer			2006
(Australia) Jim Gannon	Huddersfield Giants	2 Years	October 2006
(Australia) Mark O'Neill	Leeds Rhinos	1 Year	October 2006
(Australia) Michael Vella	Parramatta Eels	3 Years	October 2006
(Papua New Guinea) Stanley Gene	Bradford Bulls	2 Years	November 2006
(England) Matty Brooks	Bradford Bulls	1 Year	November 2006
(Ireland) Pat Weisner	Harlequins RL	1 Year	November 2006
(England) Chris Chester	Hull F.C.	2 Years	December 2006
(England) Paul Cooke	Hull F.C.	3 1/2 Years	April 2007 (Note: Cooke was found to have made an illegal approach to another club by an independent RFL tribunal and was handed a four-month playing ban in November 2007.)

=== Losses ===
Player	Club	Contract	Date
(England) Dwayne Barker	Castleford Tigers	1 Year	2006
(France) Damien Couturier	Leigh Centurions		2006
(England) Andy Ellis	Barrow Raiders		2006
(Wales) Phil Joseph	Halifax R.L.F.C.		2006
(Wales) Gareth Price	Widnes Vikings		2006
(England) Leroy Rivett	Leigh Centurions		2006
(England) Jon Whittle	Featherstone Rovers		2006
(England) Francis Stephenson	N/A	Retirement	2006
(England) James Garmston	Doncaster Lakers	2 Years	October 2006
(New Zealand) Michael Smith	Barrow Raiders		2007

== Squad ==
2007 Hull Kingston Rovers Squad
First team squad			Coaching staff
1 (England) Ben Cockayne – FB; 2 (Scotland) Jon Steel – WG; 3 (England) Jon Goddard – CE; 4 (Scotland) Gareth Morton – CE (gk); 5 (Australia) Byron Ford – WG; 6 (England) Scott Murrell – SO (gk); 7 (Australia) James Webster (c) – SH; 8 (Papua New Guinea) Makali Aizue – PR; 9 (Scotland) Ben Fisher – HK; 10 (Australia) David Tangata-Toa – PR; 11 (Scotland) Iain Morrison – SR; 13 (England) Tommy Gallagher – LF	14 (Papua New Guinea) Stanley Gene – UT; 15 (Australia) Jim Gannon – PR; 16 (England) Jason Netherton – SR; 17 (Australia) Mark O'Neill – SR; 18 (England) Danny Ward – PR; 19 (England) Matty Brooks – UT; 20 (Australia) Michael Vella – PR; 21 (Wales) Luke Dyer – WG; 22 (Samoa) Andraes Bauer – CE; 24 (England) Ian Hardman; 26 (England) Dave Wilson – CE	27 (England) Kirk Netherton – UT; 28 (England) Chris Chester – SR; 30 (Wales) Mark Lennon – UT (GK); 31 (England) Paul Cooke – SO (GK); 32 (Australia) Ryan Tandy – PR; 33 (England) Rhys Lovegrove	Head coach: (Australia) Justin Morgan; Legend: (c) Captain(s); (vc) Vice-captain(s); (gk) = Goal kicker
