= 2006 Challenge Cup =

Rugby league competition

2006 Powergen Challenge Cup
- Duration: 8 Rounds
- Highest attendance: 65,187
- Broadcast partners: (United Kingdom) BBC Sport
- Winners: St. Helens
- Runners-up: Huddersfield Giants
- Biggest home win: Leigh East 86-10 Askam
- Biggest away win: Ovenden 10-50; York City Knights
- Lance Todd Trophy: Sean Long

The 2006 Challenge Cup (also known as the Powergen Challenge Cup due to sponsorship from Powergen) was the 105th tournament played for rugby league's Challenge Cup. It features teams from across Europe including England, Scotland, Wales, France and Russia.

The competition started in January 2006 with the preliminary round where the Gloucestershire Warriors from the Rugby League Conference surprised an established Pennine League team in Illingworth. The final was scheduled to be played at the new Wembley Stadium but in March 2006 it became apparent that the stadium would not be ready for the final on 26 August so it was switched to Twickenham.

In the final St. Helens proved too strong for the Huddersfield Giants, winning by 42 points to 12. It was Huddersfield's first final since 1953, when they also faced St Helens.

== Round 1 ==
(week ending 5 February)

Sees the introduction of the major amateur clubs from the National Conference League and the teams from National League 3

Tie no	Home team	Score	Away team
1	Thornhill Trojans	30-12	Eastmoor Dragons
2	West Bowling	15-14	Halton Simms Cross
3	Bramley Buffaloes	30-12	Thatto Heath Crusaders
4	Clayton	24-32	Warrington Wizards
5	Royal Navy	16-38	Wigan St Patricks
6	Eccles & Salford	10-12	Hunslet Warriors
7	Leigh East	86-10	Askam
8	Shaw Cross Sharks ARLFC	32-22	Oldham St Annes
9	Skirlaugh	12-8	Normanton Knights
10	East Leeds	28-12	Milford Marlins
11	Ovenden	32-28	Bank Quay Bulls
12	Bradford Dudley Hill	42-12	Gateshead Storm
13	York Acorn	29-22	Ince Rose Bridge
14	Royal Air Force	13-42	Siddal
15	Wigan St Judes	12-33	Kells
16	Walney Central	18-0	Ideal Isberg
17	East Hull	46-0	Castleford Lock Lane
18	Leigh Miners Rangers	76-0	Bransholme
19	Gloucestershire Warriors	20-36	Blackbrook
20	Seaton Rangers	34-4	Rochdale Mayfield
21	Barrow Island	32-18	Stanley Rangers
22	Crosfields	20-28	Oulton Raiders
23	Saddleworth Rangers	33-32	Hull Dockers
24	Widnes St Maries	40-12	St Albans Centurions
25	The Army	38-18	West Hull

== Round 2 ==
(week ending 19 February)

Tie no	Home team	Score	Away team
1	Leigh Miners Rangers	38-26	Oulton Raiders
2	Warrington Wizards	20-22	Bradford Dudley Hill
3	East Hull	10-8	Wigan St Patricks
4	Hunslet Warriors	30-18	Siddal
5	East Leeds	22-46	Widnes St Maries
6	York Acorn	35-16	Seaton Rangers
7	Walney Central	0-28	Saddleworth Rangers
8	Ovenden	38-24	Blackbrook
9	Skirlaugh	25-12	Wath Brow Hornets
10	Bramley Buffaloes	22-28	Shaw Cross Sharks ARLFC
11	Barrow Island	18-28	Kells
12	The Army	14-20	West Bowling
13	Leigh East	14-32	Thornhill Trojans

== Round 3 ==
(week ending 12 March)

Round 3 sees the introduction of the National League 1 and 2 teams and teams from France and Russia. Amateurs Thornhill Trojans provided the first surprise result by beating national 2 team Workington Town. Late season snow caused a number of postponements on the Sunday.

Tie no	Home team	Score	Away team
1	Leigh Miners Rangers	6-34	Rochdale Hornets
2	Whitehaven	72-0	Pia
3	Thornhill Trojans	16-12	Workington Town
4	London Skolars	20-10	Gateshead Thunder
5	Batley Bulldogs	24-10	Limoux Grizzlies
6	Blackpool Panthers	10-18	Toulouse Olympique
7	Celtic Crusaders	64-4	Lokomotiv Moscow
8	Dewsbury Rams	68-0	Bradford Dudley Hill
9	Doncaster Lakers	34-18	Shaw Cross Sharks ARLFC
10	East Hull	2-20	Hunslet Hawks
11	Hull Kingston Rovers	62-1	York Acorn
12	Hunslet Warriors	0-38	Widnes Vikings
13	Leigh Centurions	80-0	Kazan Arrows
14	Oldham R.L.F.C.	34-10	Saddleworth Rangers
15	Skirlaugh	14-36	Featherstone Rovers
16	Swinton Lions	42-18	Sheffield Eagles
17	Kells	6-26	Halifax
18	Ovenden	10-50	York City Knights
19	West Bowling	0-34	Keighley Cougars
20	Widnes St Maries	14-30	Barrow Raiders

== Round 4 ==
(week ending 2 April)

Round 4 sees the introduction of the Super League teams. Some matches are now televised live by the BBC. In this round the matches chosen for transmission were at Bradford and Wakefield.

Tie no	Home team	Score	Away team
1	St. Helens	56-6	Doncaster Lakers
2	Bradford Bulls	23-12	Hull
3	Catalans Dragons	66-0	Thornhill
4	Rochdale Hornets	32-8	Celtic Crusaders
5	Barrow Raiders	40-8	Oldham R.L.F.C.
6	Batley Bulldogs	16-28	Whitehaven
7	Featherstone Rovers	44-10	Keighley Cougars
8	Halifax	8-40	Huddersfield Giants
9	Harlequins	48-6	Toulouse Olympique
10	Hunslet Hawks	0-22	Hull Kingston Rovers
11	Leigh Centurions	12-36	Leeds Rhinos
12	Salford City Reds	32-4	Dewsbury Rams
13	Swinton Lions	18-20	York City Knights
14	Wakefield Trinity Wildcats	22-32	Wigan Warriors
15	Warrington Wolves	56-0	London Skolars
16	Widnes Vikings	14-4	Castleford Tigers

== Round 5 ==
(week ending 21 May)

No new teams enter at this stage. In this round the matches chosen for transmission were at St Helens and Widnes.

Tie no	Home team	Score	Away team
1	Salford City Reds	16-4	Wigan Warriors
2	Huddersfield Giants	38-4	York City Knights
3	Widnes Vikings	16-34	Catalans Dragons
4	Leeds Rhinos	66-0	Rochdale Hornets
5	Hull Kingston Rovers	44-12	Featherstone Rovers
6	Harlequins	82-8	Barrow Raiders
7	Warrington Wolves	46-2	Whitehaven
8	St. Helens	42-18	Bradford Bulls

== Quarter-finals ==
(week ending 4 June)

In this round the matches chosen for transmission were at Hull KR and Leeds. Hull KR pulled off a major surprise when they beat Superleague team Warrington Wolves.

4 June 2006

Leeds Rhinos	36–18	Harlequins
Danny Williams (12), Scott Donald (8), Kevin Sinfield (8), Danny McGuire (4), Willie Poching (4)	(Report)	Luke Dorn (4), Tyrone Smith (4), Pat Weisner (4), Michael Worrincy (4), Rob Purdham (2)

Headingley, Leeds
Referee: Karl Kirkpatrick

4 June 2006

Hull Kingston Rovers	40–36	Warrington Wolves
Byron Ford (12), Gareth Morton (12), Makali Aizue (4), Dwayne Barker (4), Ben Cockayne (4), Jon Goddard (4)	(Report)	Chris Bridge (8), Henry Fa'afili (8), Logan Swann (8), Martin Gleeson (4), Stuart Reardon (4), Michael Sullivan (4)

Craven Park, Hull
Referee: Steve Ganson

4 June 2006

Huddersfield Giants	44–14	Salford City Reds
Michael De Vere (12), Paul March (8), Chris Nero (8), Robbie Paul (8), Martin Aspinwall (4), Brad Drew (4)	(Report)	David Hodgson (10), Aaron Moule (4)

Galpharm Stadium, Huddersfield
Referee: Ashley Klein

3 June 2006

St. Helens	56–10	Catalans Dragons
Ade Gardner (12), Paul Anderson (8), Vinnie Anderson (4), Sean Long (4), Jamie Lyon (4), Leon Pryce (4), Jon Wilkin (4)	(Report)	Stacey Jones (4), Justin Murphy (4), Laurent Frayssinous (2)

Knowsley Road, St. Helens
Referee: Richard Silverwood

== Semi-finals ==
(week ending 30 July)

Unlike earlier rounds, matches from now on will be played on neutral grounds. Huddersfield have the chance to win the Cup for the first time in 1953 when they beat this year's final opponents St Helens.

29 July 2006

St. Helens	50–0	Hull Kingston Rovers
Jamie Lyon (18), Willie Talau (8), Jon Wilkin (8), Vinnie Anderson (4), Ade Gardner (4), Sean Long (4), Paul Wellens (4)	(Report)

Galpharm Stadium, Huddersfield
Attendance: 12,868
Referee: Karl Kirkpatrick

30 July 2006

Leeds Rhinos	12–30	Huddersfield Giants
Scott Donald (4), Willie Poching (4), Kevin Sinfield (2)	(Report)	Michael De Vere (14), Stuart Donlan (8), Chris Nero (8)

Odsal Stadium, Bradford
Attendance: 12,574

== Final ==
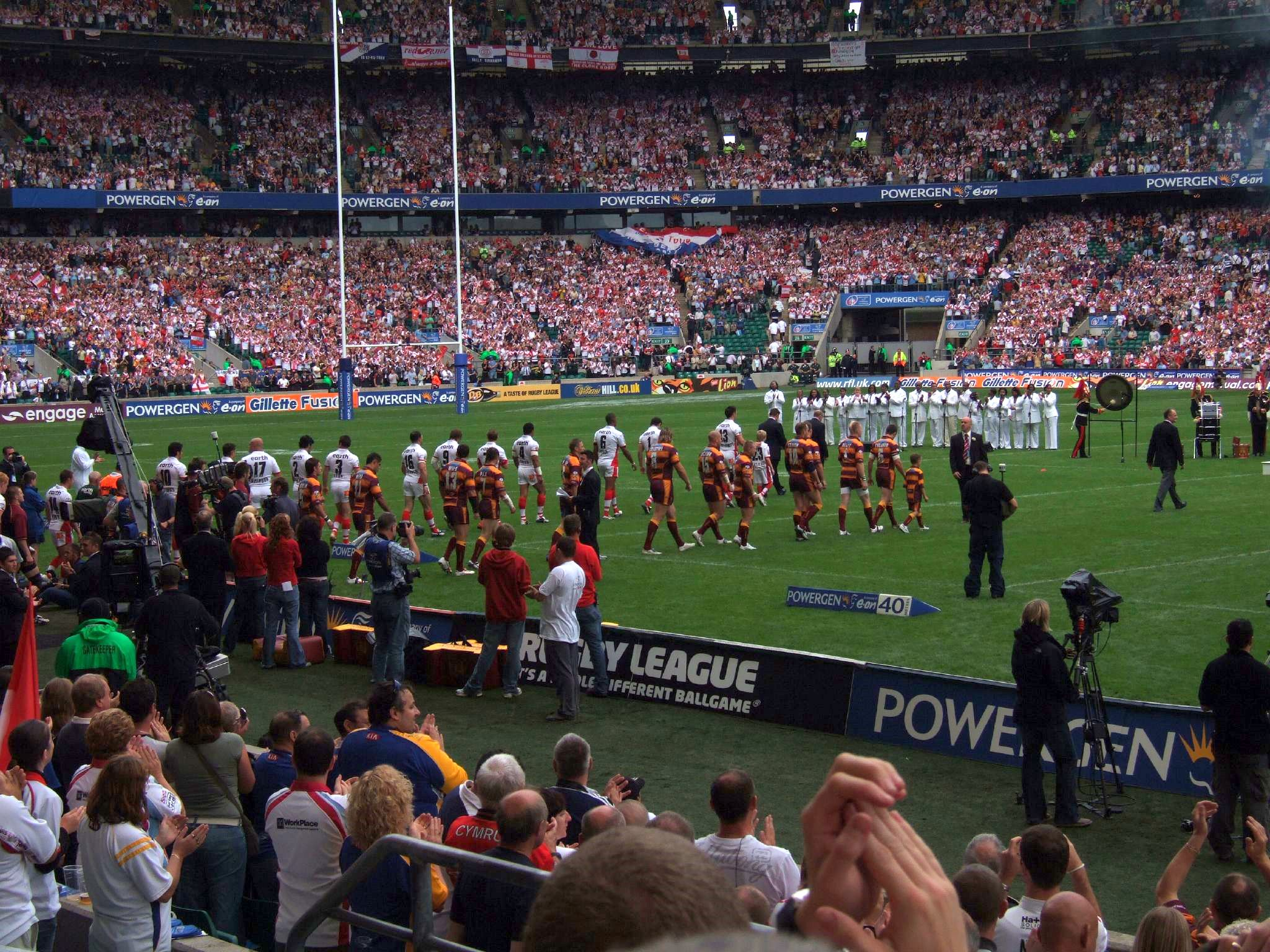
Teams lining up at Twickenham Stadium prior to the match

The final was originally scheduled to be played at Wembley Stadium though because of the construction delay was alternatively held at Twickenham Stadium, London.

26 August 2006

St. Helens	42–12	Huddersfield Giants
Jamie Lyon (18), Jon Wilkin (8), Jason Cayless (4), Maurie Fa'asavalu (4), Sean Long (4), Willie Talau (4)	(Report)	Martin Aspinwall (4), Michael De Vere (4), Robbie Paul (4)

Twickenham Stadium, London
Attendance: 65,187
Referee: Richard Silverwood

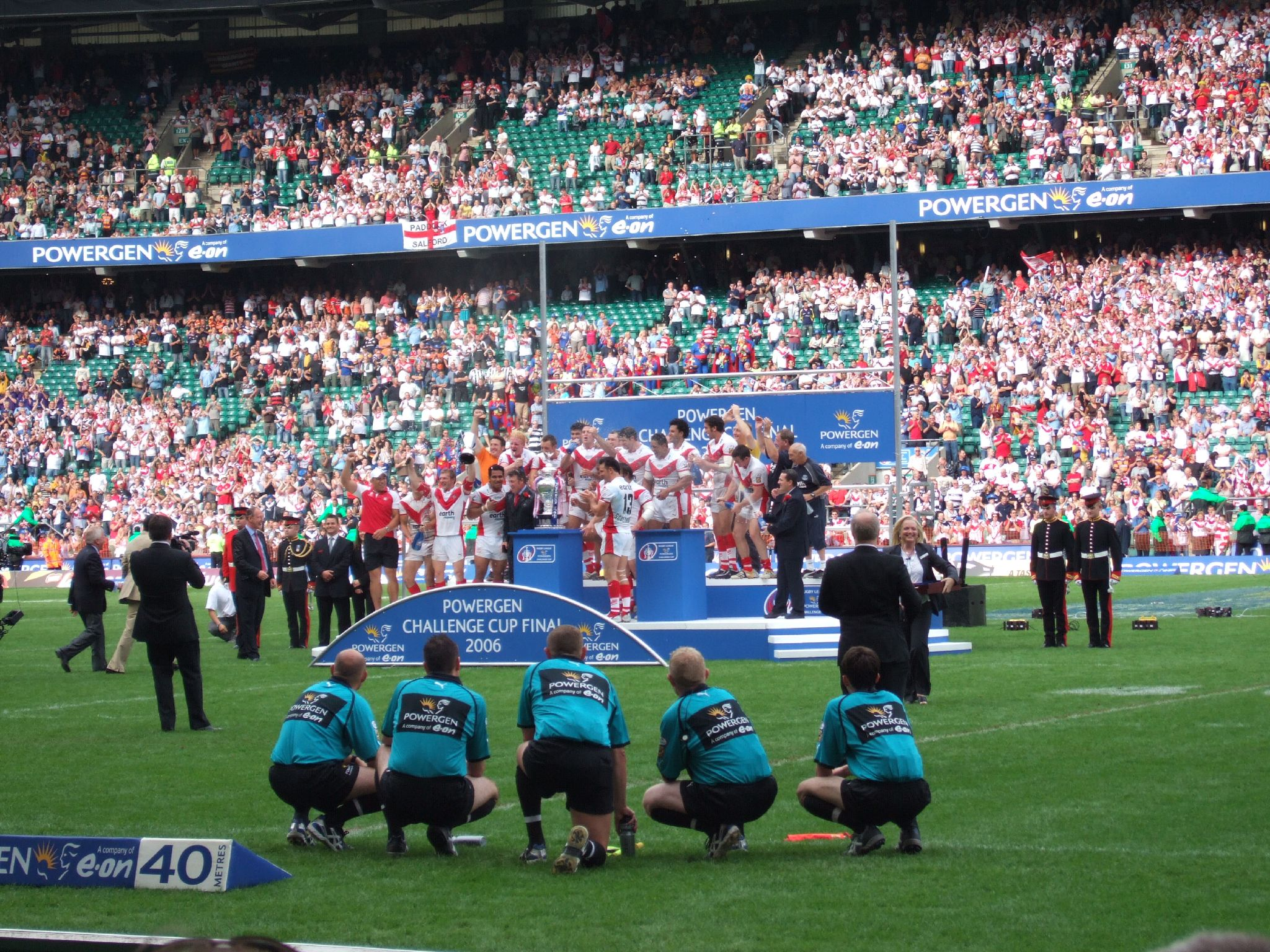
St Helens celebrating their victory

Teams:

St Helens: Paul Wellens, Ade Gardner, Jamie Lyon, Willie Talau, Francis Meli; Leon Pryce, Sean Long, Paul Anderson, Keiron Cunningham, Jason Cayless, Jon Wilkin, Paul Sculthorpe, Jason Hooper
Subs: Lee Gilmour, James Roby, James Graham, Maurie Fa'asavalu Coach: Daniel Anderson

Huddersfield: Paul Reilly, Martin Aspinwall, Stephen Wild, Michael De Vere, Stuart Donlan, Chris Thorman (c), Robbie Paul, Paul Jackson, Brad Drew, Jim Gannon, Chris Nero, Andy Raleigh, Stuart Jones
Subs: Paul Smith, Eorl Crabtree, Steve Snitch, Wayne McDonald Coach: Jon Sharp

Next: 2007

== UK Broadcasting rights ==
The tournament was screened in the United Kingdom by the BBC.

Round	BBC live match
Round 4	
Round 5	
Quarter finals	
Semi finals	St. Helens v Hull Kingston Rovers; Leeds Rhinos v Huddersfield Giants
Final	St. Helens v Huddersfield Giants
