= 2006 Rugby League National Leagues =

2006 National Leagues
- League: National League

National League One
- Champions: Hull Kingston Rovers
- League leaders: Hull Kingston Rovers

Promotion and relegation
- Promoted from National League One: Hull Kingston Rovers
- Relegated to National League Two: York City Knights; Oldham

National League Two
- Champions: Dewsbury Rams

Promotion and relegation
- Promoted from National League Two: Dewsbury Rams; Sheffield Eagles

National League Three
- Champions: Bramley Buffaloes

The 2006 National Leagues (known as the LHF Healthplan National Leagues) are the second, third and fourth divisions of rugby league in the UK.

The League One and League Three Grand Finals, and the League Two Play-off final were played at Warrington's Halliwell Jones Stadium on 8 October 2006.

== National League One ==
National League One was won by Hull Kingston Rovers, who as a result entered Super League for the first time. They had led the league for the majority of the season and defeated Widnes Vikings in the final. York City Knights and Oldham R.L.F.C. were relegated to National Two.

=== Table ===
Pos	Club	Pld	W	D	L	Pts for	Pts agst	Pts	Qualification
1	Hull Kingston Rovers	18	16	0	2	705	338	32	Play-off Semi-final
2	Widnes Vikings	18	14	0	4	729	449	28	Play-off Semi-final
3	Leigh Centurions	18	13	0	5	549	334	26	Elimination Finals
4	Whitehaven	18	12	1	5	516	408	25	Elimination Finals
5	Rochdale Hornets	18	8	0	10	462	435	16	Elimination Finals
6	Batley Bulldogs	18	8	0	10	393	467	16	Elimination Finals
7	Halifax	18	7	0	11	461	508	14	
8	Doncaster	18	6	1	11	458	533	13	
9	York City Knights	18	5	0	13	476	553	10	Relegated to National League Two
10	Oldham	18	0	0	18	220	944	0	Relegated to National League Two

=== Results ===
==== Round 1 ====
Whitehaven 26 Batley Bulldogs 8
Doncaster Lakers 0 Rochdale Hornets 44
Halifax 10 Leigh Centurions 32
Oldham R.L.F.C. 8 Hull Kingston Rovers 48
Widnes Vikings 25 York City Knights 18

==== Round 2 ====
Doncaster Lakers 32 Whitehaven 32
Batley Bulldogs 6 Halifax 26
Rochdale Hornets 28 Oldham R.L.F.C. 10
Leigh Centurions 53 Widnes Vikings 4
York City Knights 18 Hull Kingston Rovers 51

==== Round 3 ====
Whitehaven 38 Rochdale Hornets 24
Halifax 34 York City Knights 24
Oldham R.L.F.C. 10 Doncaster Lakers 56
Widnes Vikings 52 Batley Bulldogs 6
Hull Kingston Rovers 30 Leigh Centurions 6

==== Round 4 ====
Whitehaven 16 Widnes Vikings 38
Rochdale Hornets 30 York City Knights 16
Hull Kingston Rovers 30 Halifax 22
Batley Bulldogs 24 Doncaster Lakers 32
Leigh Centurions 44 Oldham R.L.F.C. 12

==== Round 5 ====
Widnes Vikings 28 Hull Kingston Rovers 42
York City Knights 10 Leigh Centurions 24
Halifax 18 Rochdale Hornets 12
Doncaster Lakers 22 Batley Bulldogs 24
Oldham R.L.F.C. 10 Whitehaven 48

==== Round 6 ====
Leigh Centurions 25 Doncaster Lakers 18
Whitehaven 30 Halifax 20
Rochdale Hornets 38 Widnes Vikings 46
Hull Kingston Rovers 80 Oldham R.L.F.C. 6
Batley Bulldogs 41 York City Knights 34

==== Round 7 ====
Doncaster Lakers 24 Hull Kingston Rovers 28
York City Knights 18 Widnes Vikings 40
Halifax 34 Oldham R.L.F.C. 28
Rochdale Hornets 32 Whitehaven 6
Batley Bulldogs 14 Leigh Centurions 8

==== Round 8 ====
Hull Kingston Rovers 74 Whitehaven 12
Widnes Vikings 34 Doncaster Lakers 12
Oldham R.L.F.C. 0 York City Knights 62
Leigh Centurions 30 Rochdale Hornets 16
Halifax 8 Batley Bulldogs 24

==== Round 9 ====
Whitehaven 32 Leigh Centurions 22
Doncaster Lakers 22 Halifax 18
York City Knights 56 Oldham R.L.F.C. 14
Rochdale Hornets 16 Hull Kingston Rovers 66
Batley Bulldogs 36 Widnes Vikings 38

==== Round 10 ====
Leigh Centurions 38 Halifax 36
York City Knights 30 Doncaster Lakers 44
Oldham R.L.F.C. 18 Rochdale Hornets 22
Hull Kingston Rovers 42 Batley Bulldogs 8
Widnes Vikings 26 Whitehaven 12

==== Round 11 ====
Doncaster Lakers 22 Leigh Centurions 34
Halifax 14 Hull Kingston Rovers 38
Whitehaven 42 York City Knights 24
Batley Bulldogs 26 Rochdale Hornets 12
Widnes Vikings 72 Oldham R.L.F.C. 18

==== Round 12 ====
Rochdale Hornets 28 Doncaster Lakers 30
Leigh Centurions 12 Whitehaven 22
York City Knights 24 Halifax 37
Hull Kingston Rovers 49 Widnes Vikings 24
Oldham R.L.F.C. 8 Batley Bulldogs 40

==== Round 13 ====
Rochdale Hornets 28 Leigh Centurions 29
Batley Bulldogs 12 Whitehaven 20
Halifax 22 Widnes Vikings 42
Hull Kingston Rovers 21 York City Knights 10
Doncaster Lakers 58 Oldham R.L.F.C. 10

==== Round 14 ====
Oldham are relegated to National League 2 following their 14th defeat of the season. York look certain to join them.

Leigh Centurions 36 Hull Kingston Rovers 10
Whitehaven 22 Doncaster Lakers 12
Oldham R.L.F.C. 8 Halifax 56
Widnes Vikings 18 Rochdale Hornets 31
York City Knights 20 Batley Bulldogs 26

==== Round 15 ====
Hull KR are close to taking the league leadership into the play-offs. Widnes are now in second place and York cling to National One by their fingertips.

Widnes Vikings 32 Leigh Centurions 16
Hull Kingston Rovers 26 Rochdale Hornets 12
Halifax 40 Doncaster Lakers 24
Batley Bulldogs 44 Oldham R.L.F.C. 16
York City Knights 28 Whitehaven 18

==== Round 16 ====
York go down fighting with their second straight win.

Oldham R.L.F.C. 28 Widnes Vikings 78
Leigh Centurions 28 Batley Bulldogs 10
Rochdale Hornets 24 Halifax 14
Doncaster Lakers 28 York City Knights 44
Whitehaven 48 Hull Kingston Rovers 12

==== Round 17 ====
Hull KR are confirmed as Minor Premiers and will have home advantage in the semi-final of the play-offs.

Oldham R.L.F.C. 12 Leigh Centurions 52
Batley Bulldogs 24 Hull Kingston Rovers 28
Halifax 18 Whitehaven 26
Doncaster Lakers 0 Widnes Vikings 56
York City Knights 24 Rochdale Hornets 18

==== Round 18 ====
Leigh Centurions 60 York City Knights 16
Hull Kingston Rovers 30 Doncaster Lakers 22
Whitehaven 66 Oldham R.L.F.C. 4
Widnes Vikings 76 Halifax 34
Rochdale Hornets 47 Batley Bulldogs 20

=== Play-offs ===
Elimination play-offs
Leigh Sports Village
3	Leigh	22
6	Batley	23
Recreation Ground
4	Whitehaven	38
5	Rochdale	10

Qualifying/Elimination semifinal
Craven Park
1	Hull KR	29
2	Widnes	22
Recreation Ground
Whitehaven	30
Batley	0

Elimination final
Halton Stadium
Widnes	24
Whitehaven	20

Grand Final
Headingley
Hull KR	29
Widnes	16

==== Grand Final ====
8 October 2006

Hull Kingston Rovers	29 – 16	Widnes Vikings
Tries: Goddard (2), Ford, Murrell, Weisner; Goals: Morton (4); Drop goals: Murrell		Tries: Dodd, Blanch, Tandy; Goals: Dodd (2)

Halliwell Jones Stadium, Warrington
Attendance: 13,024
Referee: Phil Bentham (Warrington)

== National League Two ==
National League Two was won by Dewsbury Rams, who only sealed the title on the last day of the season. Runners-up Sheffield Eagles won the play-off final against Swinton, who won through the play-offs by beating Barrow Raiders, Featherstone Rovers and Celtic Crusaders, who they beat in rugby league's first ever golden point extra time.

=== Table ===
Pos	Club	Pld	W	D	L	Pts for	Pts agst	Pts	Qualification
1	Dewsbury Rams	22	19	0	3	693	354	38	Promoted to National League One
2	Sheffield Eagles	22	18	0	4	808	390	36	Play-off Semi-final
3	Celtic Crusaders	22	14	1	7	730	387	29	Play-off Semi-final
4	Featherstone Rovers	22	14	1	7	596	504	29	Elimination Finals
5	Swinton Lions	22	13	1	8	641	475	27	Elimination Finals
6	Barrow Raiders	22	12	0	10	599	481	24	Elimination Finals
7	Gateshead Thunder	22	11	0	11	547	540	22	Elimination Finals
8	Workington Town	22	10	0	12	558	645	20	
9	London Skolars	22	5	1	16	406	776	11	
10	Hunslet Hawks	22	4	2	16	411	617	10	
11	Keighley Cougars	22	4	1	17	419	736	9	
12	Blackpool Panthers	22	4	1	17	350	853	9	

=== Results ===
==== Round 1 ====
Sheffield Eagles 44 Keighley Cougars 12
Featherstone Rovers 36 Gateshead Thunder 24
Workington Town 18 Celtic Crusaders 50
Swinton Lions 22 Barrow Raiders 20
London Skolars 30 Dewsbury Rams 34
Blackpool Panthers 14 Hunslet Hawks 12

==== Round 2 ====
Dewsbury Rams 22 Keighley Cougars 16
Featherstone Rovers 30 Sheffield Eagles 56
Workington Town 30 Barrow Raiders 22
Celtic Crusaders 70 London Skolars 0
Swinton Lions 56 Blackpool Panthers 24
Hunslet Hawks 10 Gateshead Thunder 19

==== Round 3 ====
Keighley Cougars 18 Hunslet Hawks 24
Sheffield Eagles 22 Celtic Crusaders 20
Barrow Raiders 26 Featherstone Rovers 24
London Skolars 24 Swinton Lions 38
Blackpool Panthers 16 Dewsbury Rams 36
Gateshead Thunder 54 Workington Town 6

==== Round 4 ====
Keighley Cougars 34 Blackpool Panthers 24
Hunslet Hawks 20 London Skolars 16
Barrow Raiders 32 Celtic Crusaders 16
Swinton Lions 26 Gateshead Thunder 21
Dewsbury Rams 27 Featherstone Rovers 28
Sheffield Eagles 44 Workington Town 46

==== Round 5 ====
Gateshead Thunder 38 Keighley Cougars 18
London Skolars 32 Barrow Raiders 34
Celtic Crusaders 36 Hunslet Hawks 16
Featherstone Rovers 16 Blackpool Panthers 6
Workington Town 23 Swinton Lions 18
Dewsbury Rams 27 Sheffield Eagles 12

==== Round 6 ====
Sheffield Eagles 38 Gateshead Thunder 14
Keighley Cougars 30 Celtic Crusaders 30
Blackpool Panthers 12 London Skolars 30
Barrow Raiders 12 Swinton Lions 16
Hunslet Hawks 14 Featherstone Rovers 14
Workington Town 15 Dewsbury Rams 22

==== Round 7 ====
Gateshead Thunder 16 Barrow Raiders 40
Celtic Crusaders 52 Blackpool Panthers 16
London Skolars 10 Sheffield Eagles 38
Swinton Lions 18 Dewsbury Rams 22
Hunslet Hawks 22 Keighley Cougars 4
Featherstone Rovers 19 Workington Town 12

==== Round 8 ====
Barrow Raiders 46 London Skolars 16
Dewsbury Rams 42 Celtic Crusaders 4
Blackpool Panthers 8 Swinton Lions 44
Sheffield Eagles 34 Hunslet Hawks 20
Keighley Cougars 22 Featherstone Rovers 24
Workington Town 24 Gateshead Thunder 33

==== Round 9 ====
Barrow Raiders 34 Workington Town 22
London Skolars 32 Blackpool Panthers 32
Celtic Crusaders 58 Keighley Cougars 18
Swinton Lions 54 Hunslet Hawks 22
Gateshead Thunder 27 Sheffield Eagles 26
Featherstone Rovers 34 Dewsbury Rams 14

==== Round 10 ====
Sheffield Eagles 29 Barrow Raiders 8
Workington Town 28 Featherstone Rovers 26
Swinton Lions 18 Celtic Crusaders 50
Hunslet Hawks 45 Blackpool Panthers 22
Keighley Cougars 20 Gateshead Thunder 31
Dewsbury Rams 60 London Skolars 0

==== Round 11 ====
Celtic Crusaders 28 Sheffield Eagles 12
Barrow Raiders 17 Hunslet Hawks 16
Featherstone Rovers 27 Swinton Lions 24
Blackpool Panthers 22 Keighley Cougars 18
Gateshead Thunder 16 Dewsbury Rams 20
London Skolars 16 Workington Town 30

==== Round 12 ====
Sheffield Eagles 44 Featherstone Rovers 28
Keighley Cougars 26 Barrow Raiders 18
Hunslet Hawks 12 Dewsbury Rams 42
Swinton Lions 46 Workington Town 30
Blackpool Panthers 6 Gateshead Thunder 24
London Skolars 4 Celtic Crusaders 48

==== Round 13 ====
Barrow Raiders 12 Sheffield Eagles 32
Featherstone Rovers 50 Keighley Cougars 32
Workington Town 30 Hunslet Hawks 12
Dewsbury Rams 66 Blackpool Panthers 6
Gateshead Thunder 36 London Skolars 6
Celtic Crusaders 10 Swinton Lions 21

==== Round 14 ====
Barrow Raiders 48 Gateshead Thunder 10
Swinton Lions 14 Sheffield Eagles 24
Featherstone Rovers 54 London Skolars 6
Keighley Cougars 12 Dewsbury Rams 36
Hunslet Hawks 12 Celtic Crusaders 34
Blackpool Panthers 18 Workington Town 16

==== Round 15 ====
Celtic Crusaders 42 Barrow Raiders 12
Dewsbury Rams 27 Hunslet Hawks 20
Gateshead Thunder 36 Blackpool Panthers 38
London Skolars 31 Keighley Cougars 6
Swinton Lions 26 Featherstone Rovers 22
Workington Town 10 Sheffield Eagles 70

==== Round 16 ====
Blackpool Panthers 0 Celtic Crusaders 52
Hunslet Hawks 24 Swinton Lions 24
Dewsbury Rams 36 Gateshead Thunder 8
Sheffield Eagles 46 London Skolars 0
Keighley Cougars 19 Workington Town 12
Featherstone Rovers 32 Barrow Raiders 8

==== Round 17 ====
Celtic Crusaders 18 Dewsbury Rams 38
Gateshead Thunder 22 Featherstone Rovers 36
Sheffield Eagles 18 Swinton Lions 14
London Skolars 24 Hunslet Hawks 16
Workington Town 58 Blackpool Panthers 20
Barrow Raiders 38 Keighley Cougars 14

==== Round 18 ====
Celtic Crusaders 22 Gateshead Thunder 26
Keighley Cougars 28 Swinton Lions 6
London Skolars 31 Featherstone Rovers 12
Hunslet Hawks 18 Workington Town 44
Blackpool Panthers 20 Sheffield Eagles 40
Dewsbury Rams 24 Barrow Raiders 14

==== Round 19 ====
Gateshead Thunder 26 Hunslet Hawks 18
Workington Town 50 Keighley Cougars 18
Swinton Lions 58 London Skolars 12
Featherstone Rovers 11 Celtic Crusaders 10
Barrow Raiders 36 Blackpool Panthers 14
Sheffield Eagles 21 Dewsbury Rams 20

==== Round 20 ====
Dewsbury close in on automatic promotion but Sheffield keep chasing.

Blackpool Panthers 28 Featherstone Rovers 38
Hunslet Hawks 16 Barrow Raiders 36
Keighley Cougars 14 Sheffield Eagles 58
Dewsbury Rams 20 Swinton Lions 12
London Skolars 16 Gateshead Thunder 26
Celtic Crusaders 38 Workington Town 10

==== Round 21 ====
Sheffield Eagles 52 Blackpool Panthers 0
Featherstone Rovers 34 Hunslet Hawks 24
Swinton Lions 54 Keighley Cougars 10
Barrow Raiders 26 Dewsbury Rams 28
Gateshead Thunder 16 Celtic Crusaders 28
Workington Town 28 London Skolars 18

==== Round 22 ====
Dewsbury sealed automatic promotion to National League One with a comeback victory over Workington. The Sheffield Eagles finish second after their eleventh straight win.

Blackpool Panthers 4 Barrow Raiders 60
Celtic Crusaders 14 Featherstone Rovers 11
Dewsbury Rams 30 Workington Town 16
Gateshead Thunder 16 Swinton Lions 32
Hunslet Hawks 16 Sheffield Eagles 48
Keighley Cougars 32 London Skolars 44

=== Play-offs ===
Elimination matches, 17 September

Featherstone Rovers 46–18 Gateshead Thunder
Swinton Lions 26–20 Barrow Raiders

Semi-final, 22 September

Sheffield Eagles 26–16 Celtic Crusaders

Elimination match, 24 September

Featherstone Rovers 14–27 Swinton Lions

Semi-final, 1 October

This game was the first rugby league match in the UK to be settled in golden point extra time. After 80 minutes the score was 26–26. After two periods of extra time (10 minutes each) there was no further score. Two minutes into the additional overtime Swinton's Chris Hough dropped a goal to seal it for Swinton.

Celtic Crusaders 26–27 Swinton Lions

=== Grand Final ===
National League Two Grand Final, Sunday 8 October

Sheffield Eagles 35–10 Swinton Lions

== National League Three ==
National League Three was won by Bramley Buffaloes, last year's losing finalists. The playoffs were initionally meant to involve the top 6 teams but Bradford Dudley Hill pulled out at the end of the regular season.

=== Table ===
Pos	Club	Pld	W	D	L	Pts for	Pts agst	Pts	Qualification
1	Bramley Buffaloes	16	14	0	2	606	240	26	Play-off Semi-finals
2	Hemel Stags	16	12	0	4	582	328	24	Play-off Semi-finals
3	Warrington Wizards	16	11	0	5	624	338	22	Play-off Semi-finals
4	St Albans Centurions	16	9	1	6	462	274	19	Elimination Final
5	Dewsbury Celtic	16	8	2	6	485	479	18	Elimination Final
6	Bradford Dudley Hill*	16	8	0	8	410	398	16	
7	Underbank Rangers	16	4	0	12	246	530	8	
8	Gateshead Storm	16	3	0	13	290	574	6	
9	Featherstone Lions	16	1	1	14	214	758	3	

- Hillsborough Hawks withdrew after playing two matches. These results were expunged.
- Bradford Dudley Hill withdrew from the play-offs.

=== Results ===
==== Round 1 ====
Underbank Rangers 10 Warrington Wizards 60
Dewsbury Celtic 13 Hemel Stags 36
Featherstone Lions 20 Bradford Dudley Hill 30
St Albans Centurions 28 Gateshead Storm 14

==== Round 2 ====
St Albans Centurions 6 Bramley Buffaloes 10
Featherstone Lions 10 Warrington Wizards 82
Bradford Dudley Hill 34 Dewsbury Celtic 18
Gateshead Storm 16 Underbank Rangers 32

==== Round 3 ====
Hemel Stags 34 Bradford Dudley Hill 20
Bramley Buffaloes 34 Underbank Rangers 14
Featherstone Lions 14 Gateshead Storm 44
Dewsbury Celtic 42 Warrington Wizards 35

==== Round 4 ====
St Albans Centurions 48 Underbank Rangers 8
Bramley Buffaloes 76 Featherstone Lions 0
Gateshead Storm 36 Dewsbury Celtic 44
Warrington Wizards 24 Hemel Stags 34

==== Round 5 ====
Bradford Dudley Hill 18 Warrington Wizards 6
Featherstone Lions 10 St Albans Centurions 44
Dewsbury Celtic 18 Bramley Buffaloes 26
Hemel Stags 40 Gateshead Storm 30

==== Round 6 ====
Bramley Buffaloes 20 Hemel Stags 24
Dewsbury Celtic 34 St Albans Centurions 24
Gateshead Storm 16 Bradford Dudley Hill 22
Underbank Rangers 22 Featherstone Lions 16

==== Round 7 ====
Hemel Stags 20 St Albans Centurions 12
Dewsbury Celtic 52 Underbank Rangers 0
Gateshead Storm 10 Warrington Wizards 54
Bradford Dudley Hill 20 Bramley Buffaloes 22

==== Round 8 ====
St Albans Centurions 42 Bradford Dudley Hill 10
Featherstone Lions 14 Dewsbury Celtic 14
Underbank Rangers 24 Hemel Stags 36
Bramley Buffaloes 48 Warrington Wizards 24

==== Round 9 ====
Bradford Dudley Hill 34 Underbank Rangers 0
Bramley Buffaloes 70 Gateshead Storm 8
Warrington Wizards 36 St Albans Centurions 26
Hemel Stags 90 Featherstone Lions 14

==== Round 10 ====
Hemel Stags 56 Dewsbury Celtic 0
Bradford Dudley Hill 56 Featherstone Lions 10
Gateshead Storm 4 St Albans Centurions 44
Warrington Wizards 50 Underbank Rangers 16

==== Round 11 ====
Dewsbury Celtic 42 Bradford Dudley Hill 30
Warrington Wizards 48 Featherstone Lions 20
Bramley Buffaloes 16 St Albans Centurions 14
Underbank Rangers v Gateshead Storm – Postponed

==== Round 12 ====
Bradford Dudley Hill 34 Hemel Stags 12
Warrington Wizards 36 Dewsbury Celtic 18
Underbank Rangers 12 Bramley Buffaloes 32
Gateshead Storm 26 Featherstone Lions 18

==== Round 13 ====
Hemel Stags 24 Warrington Wizards 45
Dewsbury Celtic 50 Gateshead Storm 20
Underbank Rangers 10 St Albans Centurions 38
Featherstone Lions 8 Bramley Buffaloes 44

==== Round 14 ====
Warrington Wizards 56 Bradford Dudley Hill 16
Gateshead Storm 6 Hemel Stags 48
St Albans Centurions 56 Featherstone Lions 28
Bramley Buffaloes 88 Dewsbury Celtic 16

==== Round 15 ====
Bradford Dudley Hill 34 Gateshead Storm 36
Hemel Stags 12 Bramley Buffaloes 38
St Albans Centurions 26 Dewsbury Celtic 26
Featherstone Lions 10 Underbank Rangers 8

==== Round 16 ====
Bramley Buffaloes 40 Bradford Dudley Hill 14
Warrington Wizards 24 Gateshead Storm 0
St Albans Centurions 22 Hemel Stags 6
Underbank Rangers 6 Dewsbury Celtic 32

==== Round 17 ====
Bradford Dudley Hill 24 St Albans Centurions 0
Warrington Wizards 22 Bramley Buffaloes 14
Hemel Stags 58 Underbank Rangers 16
Dewsbury Celtic 66 Featherstone Lions 12

==== Round 18 ====
Featherstone Lions 10 Hemel Stags 52
Gateshead Storm 24 Bramley Buffaloes 28
Underbank Rangers 44 Bradford Dudley Hill 14
St Albans Centurions 32 Warrington Wizards 18

=== Play-offs ===
Elimination match, 17 September. Bradford Dudley Hill withdrew from the play-offs.

St Albans Centurions 36–16 Dewsbury Celtic

Elimination match, 24 September

Warrington Wizards 30–12 St Albans Centurions

Semi-final, 24 September

Bramley Buffaloes 30–10 Hemel Stags

Semi-final, 1 October

Hemel Stags 27–16 Warrington Wizards

=== Grand Final ===
National League Three Grand Final, Sunday 8 October

Hemel Stags 8–30 Bramley Buffaloes
