= Stuart Donlan =

English rugby league footballer and coach

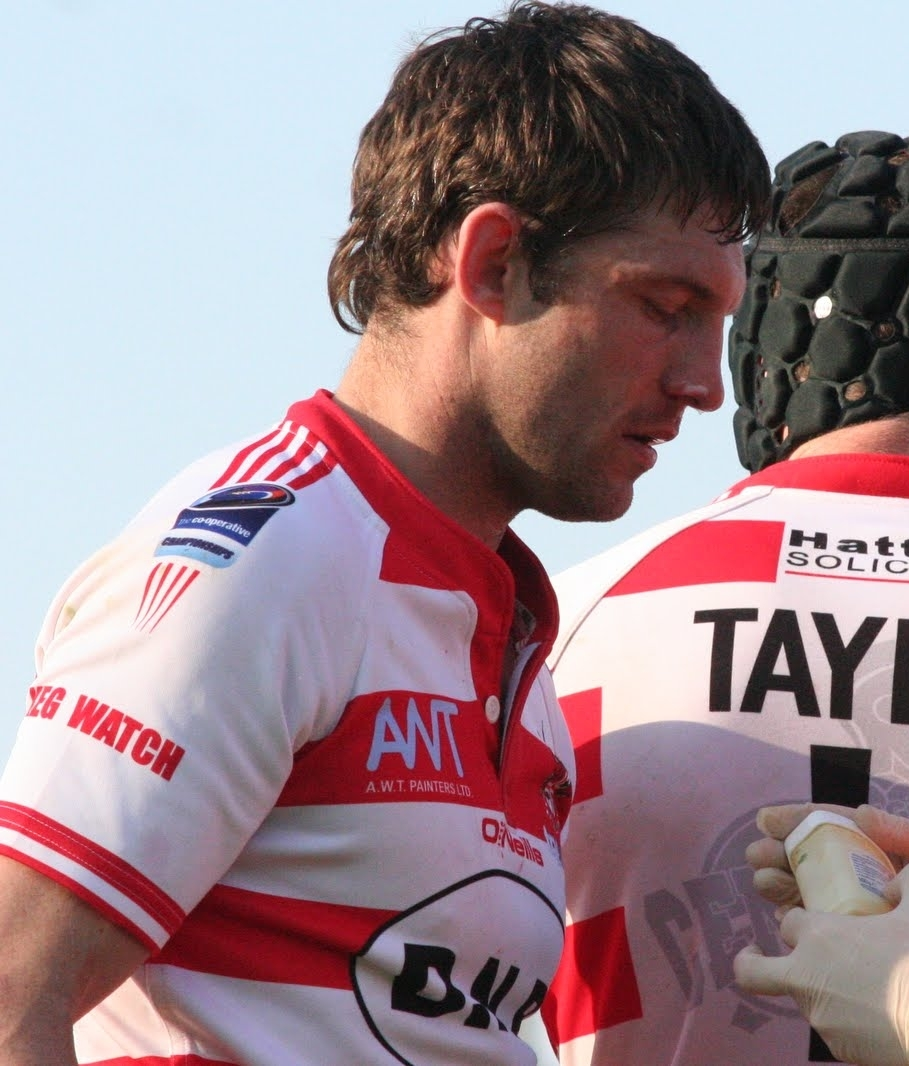

Personal information
- Born: 29 August 1978 (age 46); Leigh, Greater Manchester, England

Playing information
- Position: Wing, Fullback
Club
Years	Team	Pld	T	G	FG	P
1997–00	Leigh Centurions	111	39	0	0	116
2001–03	Halifax	71	24	0	0	96
2004–06	Huddersfield Giants	72	21	0	0	84
2007–08	Castleford Tigers	50	28	0	0	112
2009–11	Leigh Centurions	83	40	0	0	160
	Total	387	152	0	0	568
Representative
Years	Team	Pld	T	G	FG	P
2002	Lancashire	2	1	0	0	4

Coaching information
Representative
Years	Team	Gms	W	D	L	W%
2014	Canada	1	1	0	0	100

Stuart Donlan (born 29 August 1978) is an English professional rugby league coach and former player of the 1990s and 2000s. He is the current head coach of Canada. A Lancashire representative backline player, he previously played for Super League sides Huddersfield Giants and Castleford Tigers. Donlan began his career with hometown club Leigh Centurions in 1997 before finishing his career with Leigh in 2011 and moving into a coaching role.

Stuart's father, Steve Donlan, was also a former professional rugby league footballer who played for Great Britain, and was a member of the Leigh team, that won the Championship at the end of the 1981–82 season.

Donlan played for Huddersfield in the 2006 Challenge Cup Final on the wing but the Giants lost 12–42 against St. Helens. Having spent the final three years of his career with Leigh, Donlan became the assistant coach to Ian Millward at Castleford Tigers, one of Donlan's former clubs, after the pair previously worked together at Leigh Centurions ahead of the 2012 Super League season. He departed Castleford in 2013 following Millward's sacking, and later became assistant coach under Brian Noble at Salford City Reds, where he served for a year before leaving the club along with Noble in early 2014. He was subsequently named head coach of the Canada national team.

== Coaching career ==
Stuart's first game was the only game of the 2014 Colonial Cup. He led Canada to a famous victory which made them the Colonial Cup champions for the very first time. Despite his success Donlan was replaced by Aaron Zimmerle, the head coach of the Queensland Cup team Tweed Heads Seagulls, in 2015 as he took over the role to coach Canada in the 2017 Rugby League World Cup qualifying campaign.
