= Bryan Murrell =

English rugby league footballer

Personal information
- Full name: Bryan P. Murrell
- Born: 20 September 1955 (age 70) Leeds district, England

Playing information
- Position: Fullback, Wing, Centre, Stand-off
Club
Years	Team	Pld	T	G	FG	P
1973–79	Leeds	75	27	0	0	83
1979–≥84	Hunslet	138	38	1	5	145
	Total	213	65	1	5	228
- Education: Stainbeck High School
- Relatives: Scott Murrell (son)

Bryan Murrell (born 3 April 1955) is an English former professional rugby league footballer who played in the 1970s and 1980s. He played at club level for Leeds Juniors ARLFC, Leeds and Hunslet, as a fullback, wing, centre and stand-off.

== Background ==
Murrell's birth was registered in Leeds district, West Riding of Yorkshire, England, and he was a pupil at Stainbeck High School.

== Playing career ==
=== Challenge Cup Final appearances ===
Murrell played fullback in Leeds' 16-7 victory over Widnes in the 1976–77 Challenge Cup Final at Wembley Stadium, London.

=== Club career ===
Murrell made his début for Leeds against Keighley at Headingley Rugby Stadium on Tuesday 2 October 1973, he played at wing, centre, and stand-off before eventually replacing Dave Marshall as Leeds' regular fullback, Murrell scored a vital touch-line conversion in the 8-2 victory over Workington Town in the 1976–77 Challenge Cup quarter-final match at Derwent Park, Workington, on Sunday 13 March 1977, he fell-out-of-favour with Leeds' management during the 1976–77 season, and was later transferred to Hunslet in 1979.

== Genealogical information ==
Murrell is the father of the rugby league footballer; Scott Murrell.
