= Mark O'Neill (rugby league) =

Australian rugby league footballer

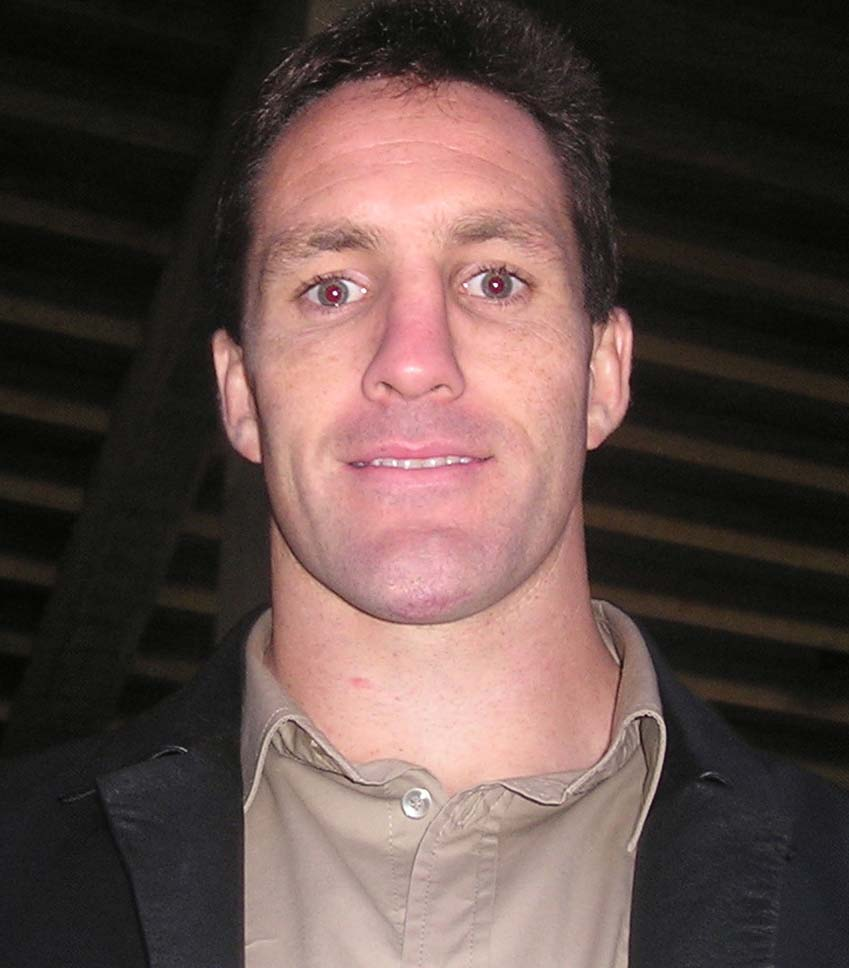
- O'Neill in 2004

Personal information
- Born: 19 June 1975 (age 51) Paddington, New South Wales, Australia

Playing information
- Height: 188 cm (6 ft 2 in)
- Weight: 100 kg (15 st 10 lb)
- Position: Second-row, Lock
Club
Years	Team	Pld	T	G	FG	P
1994–99	Balmain Tigers	102	10	0	0	40
2000–05	Wests Tigers	121	11	0	0	44
2006	Leeds Rhinos	11	0	0	0	0
2007	Hull Kingston Rovers	17	5	0	0	20
	Total	251	26	0	0	104

Mark O'Neill (born 19 June 1975) is an Australian former professional rugby league footballer who played in the 1990s and 2000s. He played in Australia for the Balmain Tigers, then the Wests Tigers following the joint venture of Balmain and the Western Suburbs Magpies, and in England for the Leeds Rhinos and Hull Kingston Rovers in the Super League. O'Neill usually played as a second-row. O'Neill held the NSWRL/NRL record for the most first grade games played before competing in a finals match which stood at 219 games before this was overtaken by Luke Brooks. He is currently the General Manager of football at Parramatta Eels NRL.

== Biography ==
O'Neill was born in Paddington, New South Wales, Australia on 19 June 1985.

=== Playing career ===
A staunch and durable player, O'Neill was a member of the Tigers, in both their forms, for 13 seasons. He was a local Balmain junior who played at the Dundas Shamrocks and North Ryde Hawks clubs. O'Neill made his first grade debut for Balmain in round 19 of the 1994 NSWRL season against St. George at Leichhardt Oval. O'Neill played in Balmain's final ever match as a stand-alone entity which came against Canberra in round 26 of the 1999 NRL season. The match finished 42–14. O'Neill was one of the players from the Balmain club who was offered a contract to play for the newly formed Wests Tigers side. O'Neill played in Wests Tigers inaugural match in round 1 of the 2000 NRL season against Brisbane at Campbelltown Stadium which finished in a 24–24 draw.

O'Neill played his 200th NRL match against the Sydney Roosters at Campbelltown Stadium in Round 16, 2004, but the milestone match would not be remembered for the right reasons as the Tigers lost by 56–0.

Three weeks later, he was on the receiving end of a serious case of foul-play in 2004 when Danny Williams of the Melbourne Storm punched O'Neill in the face in an off the ball incident. Williams received a ban of 18 matches.

In 2005 he was voted team captain, a title Scott Prince took over during O'Neill's twelve weeks absence with an elbow injury. Controversially, coach Tim Sheens retained Prince as captain on O'Neill's return to the team. He went on to play at second-row forward in the Tigers 2005 NRL Grand Final win over the North Queensland Cowboys.

At the end of the 2005 season, O'Neill moved to England and Leeds Rhinos. His season at Leeds was marred by injury. A pre-season friendly resulted in a shoulder injury which sidelined him for four months and a leg muscle tear resulted in six weeks off the field. O'Neill's contract at Leeds was not renewed and he spent 2007 at Hull Kingston Rovers where he played his final year in professional rugby league before retiring.

=== Post-playing career ===
In February 2008, O'Neill was appointed to the NRL's Match Review Committee. The committee scans match videos for incidents of foul play.

In 2016, O'Neill worked at his former club the Wests Tigers as football manager but later resigned after alleged misconduct.

He also worked for Sky News as a rugby league analyst.

In October 2018, O'Neill was appointed as general manager of football at the Parramatta Eels.

== Career highlights ==
- First Grade Debut: 1994 – Round 19, Balmain v St George, Leichhardt Oval, Sydney, 6 August.
- Premierships: 2005 – Wests Tigers defeated North Queensland Cowboys 30–16 in the Grand Final, Stadium Australia, Sydney, 2 October.
- Wests Tigers Club Captain: 2005
