= Luke Dyer =

Wales international rugby league footballer

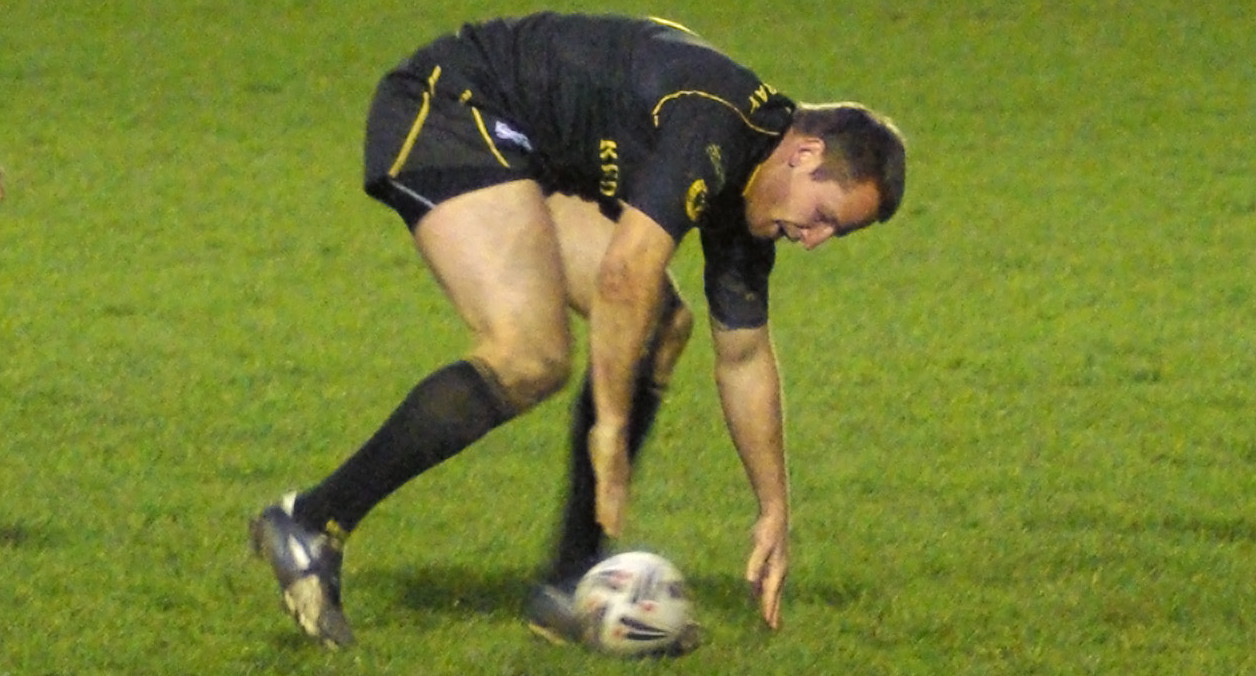

Personal information
- Full name: Luke Dyer
- Born: 15 August 1981 (age 45) Penrith, New South Wales, Australia

Playing information
- Height: 6 ft 1 in (1.85 m)
- Weight: 15 st 4 lb (97 kg)
- Position: Centre, Wing
Club
Years	Team	Pld	T	G	FG	P
2004	Penrith Panthers	1	0	0	0	0
2006	Castleford Tigers	20	5	0	0	20
2007	Hull Kingston Rovers	27	12	0	0	48
2009–10	Crusaders RL	66	25	0	0	100
	Total	114	42	0	0	168
Representative
Years	Team	Pld	T	G	FG	P
2007	Wales	3	1	0	0	4

Luke Dyer (born 15 August 1981) is a former rugby league footballer who played in the 2000s and 2010s. Dyer had played at representative level for Wales, and at club level for the Penrith Panthers in the National Rugby League, the Castleford Tigers, Hull Kingston Rovers, the (Celtic) Crusaders, and the Central Comets in the Queensland Cup, as a wing, or centre.

== Background ==
Dyer was born in Penrith, New South Wales, Australia.

== Playing career ==
Dyer played for the Melbourne Storm in the 2004 Rugby League World Sevens pre-season tournament. He was later released by Melbourne, returning to Penrith Panthers during the 2004 NRL season, making his NRL debut for Penrith against Melbourne in round 17.

Dyer represented for Wales in Rugby League World Cup qualifying matches.

Dyer scored the Crusaders first and only try in their first game in the Super League.
