= Desi Williams =

English rugby league footballer

Personal information
- Full name: Desi Williams
- Born: 24 September 1985 (age 40)

Playing information
- Position: Wing
Club
| Years | Team | Pld | T | G | FG | P |
|---|---|---|---|---|---|---|
| 2004 | Wigan Warriors | 2 | 0 | 0 | 0 | 0 |
| 2006 | Hull Kingston Rovers | 3 | 1 | 0 | 0 | 4 |
| 2006(loan) | →Barrow Raiders | 4 | 1 | 0 | 0 | 4 |
| 2006(loan) | →Oldham RLFC | 11 | 4 | 0 | 0 | 16 |
| 2007 | Swinton Lions | 13 | 7 | 0 | 0 | 28 |
| | Total | 33 | 13 | 0 | 0 | 52 |

Desi Williams is a former professional rugby league footballer born in London, England. He started his career at London Skolars before being signed by Wigan Warriors, and playing in the successful Youth Academy at Wigan in which he was a regular player, normally starting on the Wing.

Desi was taken to Sydney, Australia to play in the successful England U18s team that defeated the Australian Under 18's side. He was given his chance in the first team at Wigan Warriors in 2004. After a decent first game he was criticised for his bad performance a week later against Castleford Tigers in which he dropped numerous high balls in dangerous territory and was subsequently dropped the week later.

Desi never made another first team appearance for Wigan again under Ian Millward despite some successful appearances in the Under 21s. He eventually left the Wigan outfit to try his luck at National League One side Hull Kingston Rovers. Desi made a handful of appearances for the Robins before being loaned out to National League One strugglers Oldham but was unable to stop the Roughyeds from avoiding the drop from the National League One this season.
