= Andy Raleigh =

English rugby league footballer

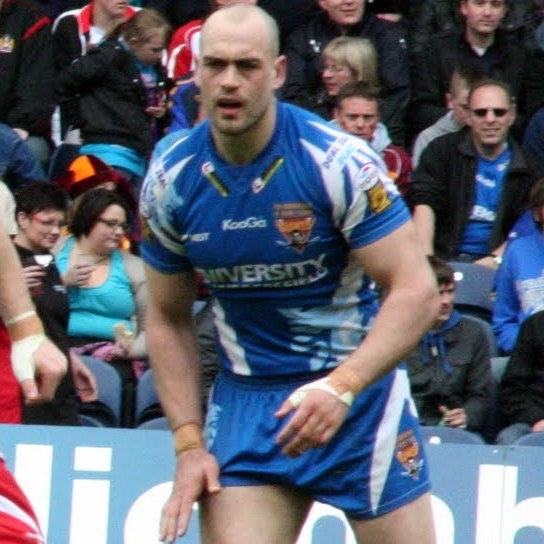

Personal information
- Full name: Andrew James Patrick Raleigh
- Born: 17 March 1981 (age 45) Huddersfield, West Yorkshire, England

Playing information
- Height: 6 ft 3 in (1.91 m)
- Weight: 16 st 7 lb (105 kg)
- Position: Second-row, Prop
Club
Years	Team	Pld	T	G	FG	P
2004–05	Sheffield Eagles	28	6	0	0	24
2005–06	Hull Kingston Rovers	29	17	0	0	68
2006–11	Huddersfield Giants	132	16	0	0	64
2012–14	Wakefield Trinity Wildcats	58	7	0	0	28
	Total	247	46	0	0	184

Andy Raleigh (born 17 March 1981) is an English former professional rugby league footballer. He played in the Super League for the Huddersfield Giants, Hull Kingston Rovers and the Wakefield Trinity Wildcats. He played as a second-row or as a prop.

== Background ==
Raleigh was born in Huddersfield, West Yorkshire, England. He studied for a BSc in Geography at Newcastle University and during his time there played for the university rugby league team and represented the North East, England students and Great Britain students. In his final year at University Andy received the Student Player of the Year Award.

== Club career ==
Between 2002 and 2004, Raleigh played for Sheffield Eagles. In November 2004, Raleigh joined Hull Kingston Rovers. He scored 17 tries in 30 appearances during which time the club won the Northern Rail Cup and Raleigh was named National League Player of the Year. In September 2005, Raleigh signed a two-year deal to join Huddersfield Giants ahead of the 2006 season. Raleigh played for Huddersfield in the 2006 Challenge Cup Final at second-row against St. Helens but the Giants lost 12–42. In October 2011, Raleigh joined Wakefield Trinity Wildcats on a two-year deal. Raleigh announced his retirement at the end of the 2014 season.
