= Kirk Netherton =

English rugby league footballer

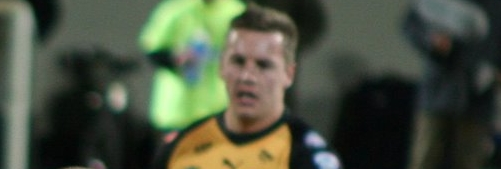

Personal information
- Full name: Kirk Alan Netherton
- Born: 10 May 1985 (age 41) Hull, Humberside, England

Playing information
- Height: 5 ft 9 in (1.75 m)
- Weight: 15 st 0 lb (95 kg)
- Position: Hooker
Club
Years	Team	Pld	T	G	FG	P
2007–09	Hull Kingston Rovers	24	3	0	0	12
2009–10	Castleford Tigers	31	4	0	0	16
2010–11	Widnes Vikings	0	0	0	0	0
2011	Featherstone Rovers	15	4	0	0	16
	Total	70	11	0	0	44
- Relatives: Jason Netherton (cousin)

Kirk Netherton (born 10 May 1985) is an English former rugby league footballer who played as a hooker.

== Career ==
Kirk formerly played for Hull Kingston Rovers, and made his Super League début against Catalans Dragons Easter Monday 2007 season. He re-signed for another year at The Jungle to play for Castleford Tigers in 2010. In 2010 he joined Widnes Vikings for one month in 2010 which then was made permanent after the one month. He joined Featherstone for the 2011 season and went on to win the Championship Grand Final beating Sheffield Eagles 40–4. This was also his last game for the club, after which he decided to retire from the sport.
