= Jason Netherton =

English rugby league footballer

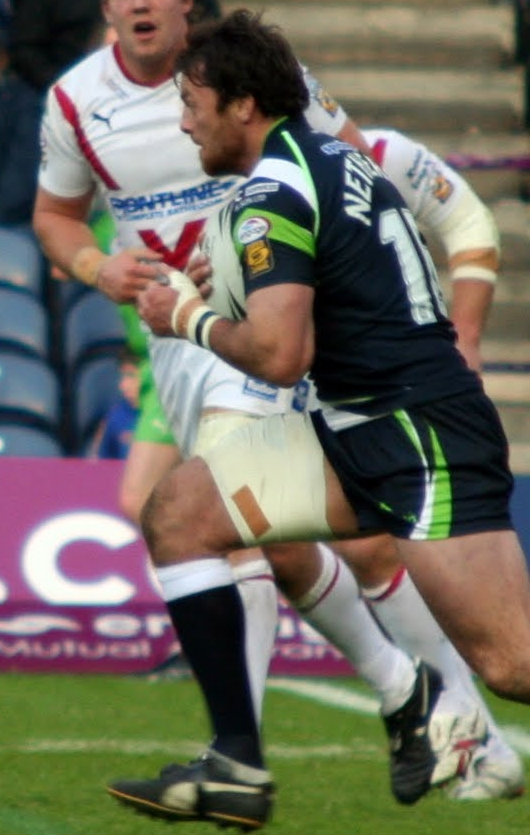

Personal information
- Full name: Jason Robert Netherton
- Born: 5 October 1982 (age 43) Hull, Humberside, England
- Height: 6 ft 2 in (188 cm)
- Weight: 16 st 5 lb (104 kg)

Playing information
- Position: Second-row
Club
Years	Team	Pld	T	G	FG	P
2001–04	Leeds Rhinos	3	0	0	0	0
2002(loan)	→ Halifax Blue Sox	5	0	0	0	0
2003(loan)	→ London Broncos	3	0	0	0	0
2004(loan)	→ London Broncos	3	0	0	0	0
2004–12	Hull Kingston Rovers	168	13	0	0	52
2013–14	Hull Kingston Rovers	26	0	0	0	0
	Total	208	13	0	0	52
- As of 11 May 2024
- Relatives: Kirk Netherton (cousin)

Jason Netherton (born 5 October 1982) is an English former professional rugby league footballer who spent most of his career playing for Hull Kingston Rovers in the Super League. His usual position was second-row.

== Playing career ==
Jason Netherton, or 'Nev' was born in Hull, but was signed up by Leeds Rhinos from local amateur club West Hull. He is noted for his high work rate and tenacious defence, provides Rovers with plenty of the all-important power in the pack. On 3 June 2011, Jason signed a new deal with Hull Kingston Rovers until the end of the 2013 season.

In 2013, after 160 Super League matches, Netherton, now 30, was released from his contract with Hull Kingston Rovers and linked up with the Mackay Cutters for the 2013 and 2014 seasons of the Queensland Cup. the Mackay Cutters are the feeder club to NRL side North Queensland Cowboys.

In the 2014 season, Netherton signed a one-year deal with Hull Kingston Rovers, and appeared sporadically as a second-row.

== Coaching ==
He joined the Hull KR backroom staff as academy head coach in 2024, and left in December 2025.
