= Scott Murrell =

English rugby league footballer (born 1985)

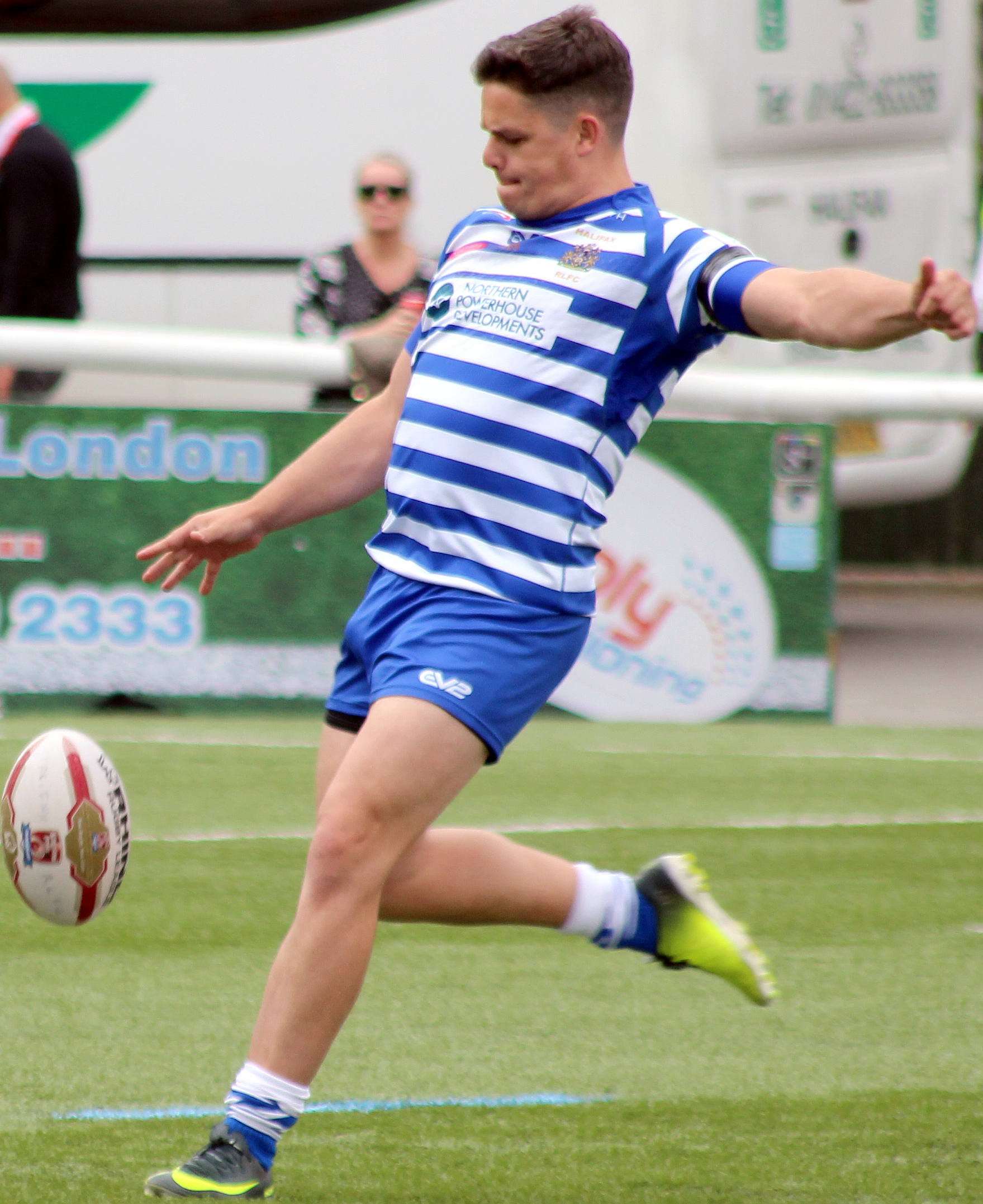

Personal information
- Full name: Scott Murrell
- Born: 5 September 1985 (age 40) Leeds, West Yorkshire, England
- Height: 5 ft 11 in (1.80 m)
- Weight: 14 st 9 lb (93 kg)

Playing information
- Position: Stand-off, Scrum-half, Hooker, Loose forward
Club
| Years | Team | Pld | T | G | FG | P |
|---|---|---|---|---|---|---|
| 2004–05 | Leeds Rhinos | 1 | 0 | 0 | 0 | 0 |
| 2004(loan) | → London Broncos | 6 | 2 | 0 | 0 | 8 |
| 2006–12 | Hull Kingston Rovers | 177 | 42 | 36 | 4 | 244 |
| 2013–20 | Halifax | 209 | 39 | 40 | 8 | 244 |
| 2021–22 | Keighley Cougars | 35 | 5 | 0 | 0 | 20 |
| 2023 | Midlands Hurricanes | 2 | 0 | 0 | 0 | 0 |
| | Total | 430 | 88 | 76 | 12 | 516 |

Coaching information
Club
| Years | Team | Gms | W | D | L | W% |
| 2026– | Castleford Tigers | 3 | 1 | 0 | 2 | 33 |
- Source: As of 28 August 2026
- Father: Bryan Murrell

Scott Murrell (born 5 September 1985) is an English rugby league coach and former professional rugby league footballer who is interim coach for the Castleford Tigers in the Super League.

He played as a stand-off, scrum-half or loose forward in the 2000s, 2010s and 2020s. He spent the majority of his professional career with Hull Kingston Rovers in the Super League and then with Halifax in the RFL Championship. He also played in the Super League for the Leeds Rhinos and the London Broncos, and in the RFL League 1 for the Keighley Cougars and the Midlands Hurricanes.

Murrell played at representative level for Great Britain (Academy) touring Australia.

== Background ==
Scott Murrell was born in Leeds, West Yorkshire, England. He is the son of the rugby league footballer Bryan Murrell.

He was inducted into the Halifax Hall of Fame

== Playing career ==
=== Hull Kingston Rovers ===
Murrell joined Hull Kingston Rovers from the Leeds Rhinos for their 2006 National League One campaign. He scored a try and a drop goal in the promotion Grand Final against Widnes as the Robins returned to the top flight.

In August 2012, it was announced that Murrell would leave Hull KR at the end of the season after seven years with the club. In total, he made 177 appearances and scored 42 tries, 36 goals and 4 drop goals.

=== Halifax ===
In October 2012, Halifax R.L.F.C. announced that Murrell would join from the 2013 Championship season. He was appointed club captain.

In September 2014, Murrell was appointed interim head coach of Halifax after Karl Harrison departed the club late in the season. In 2017, he celebrated his testimonial year.

In August 2020, Halifax confirmed that Murrell would depart the club. Across eight seasons with Halifax, he made 209 appearances and scored 39 tries, 40 goals and 8 drop goals.

=== Keighley Cougars ===
On 4 August 2020, it was announced that Murrell would join the Keighley Cougars for the 2021 season. After two seasons with Keighley, Murrell announced in August 2022 that he would retire from playing at the end of the 2022 season.

=== Midlands Hurricanes ===
In July 2023, Murrell came out of retirement aged 37 to play two games for the Midlands Hurricanes in League 1. He was a member of the coaching staff at the Castleford Tigers, who had a dual registration arrangement with the Hurricanes, and had recently featured for the Castleford reserves side. He played as a scrum-half in a surprise victory over Doncaster and in a defeat against Rochdale the following week.

== Coaching career ==
=== Keighley Cougars ===
Following his retirement at the end of the 2022 season, Murrell joined Keighley's coaching team working under Rhys Lovegrove.

=== Castleford Tigers ===
In December 2022, Murrell joined the coaching staff at the Castleford Tigers. His primary role would be head coach of the reserves team, although he would also work as an assistant to Lee Radford and Andy Last with the first team.

In August 2026 he took over as interim head coach following the suspension of head coach Ryan Carr.
