= Tommy Gallagher (rugby league) =

English rugby league footballer

Personal information
- Full name: Thomas Gallagher
- Born: 10 September 1983 (age 42) Dewsbury, Yorkshire, England

Playing information
- Position: Prop
Club
Years	Team	Pld	T	G	FG	P
2002	Keighley Cougars	3	1	0	0	4
2003	York City Knights	2	0	0	0	0
2003	London Broncos	10	1	0	0	4
2004	Widnes Vikings	6	0	0	0	0
2004–07	Hull Kingston Rovers	56	20	0	0	80
2007	Batley Bulldogs	7	1	0	0	4
2008	Widnes Vikings	14	2	0	0	8
2009	Rochdale Hornets	17	4	0	0	16
2010	Batley Bulldogs	21	6	0	0	24
2011	Swinton Lions	13	5	0	0	20
2012	Leigh Centurions	21	5	0	0	20
2013–14	Dewsbury Rams	53	14	1	0	58
2015	Swinton Lions	22	8	1	0	34
2018	Swinton Lions	3	0	0	0	0
	Total	248	67	2	0	272
Representative
Years	Team	Pld	T	G	FG	P
2003–04	Ireland	5	0	0	0	0

Tommy Gallagher (born 10 September 1983) is former a rugby league footballer who played as a prop but also appeared as a stand-off, second-row or loose forward.

Gallagher was born in Dewsbury, and grew up in Birstall.

Gallagher is a product of the Leeds academy, but has had spells with Hull Kingston Rovers, the Keighley Cougars, the London Broncos, the Widnes (two spells), the Batley Bulldogs (two spells), the Rochdale Hornets and the Swinton Lions before joining the Leigh Centurions in time for the 2012 season. Tommy Gallagher is the elder brother of rugby league footballer John Gallagher.

Gallagher initially ended his playing career in 2015, but came out of retirement for the 2018 season.
