= Michael Smith (rugby league, born 1976) =

NZ international rugby league footballer

Personal information
- Born: 10 May 1976 (age 50) Auckland, New Zealand

Playing information

Rugby union
Representative
Years	Team	Pld	T	G	FG	P
	North Harbour

Rugby league
- Position: Second-row, Prop
Club
Years	Team	Pld	T	G	FG	P
1996–97	Canterbury Bulldogs	12	2	0	0	8
1998	Castleford Tigers	23	6	0	0	24
1999	Hull Sharks	19	3	0	0	12
2000–01	York	13	5	0	0	20
2001–04	Castleford Tigers	107	28	0	0	112
2005–07	Hull Kingston Rovers	43	20	0	0	80
2007	Barrow Raiders	22	5	0	0	20
	Total	239	69	0	0	276
Representative
Years	Team	Pld	T	G	FG	P
2002	New Zealand	3	0	0	0	0

Michael Smith (born 10 May 1976) is a New Zealand rugby union and rugby league footballer who played in the 1990s and 2000s. He played representative level rugby union (RU) for North Harbour. and representative level rugby league (RL) for New Zealand, and at club level for Canterbury Bulldogs, Castleford Tigers (twice), Hull Sharks, York, Hull Kingston Rovers, Barrow Raiders and Te Atatu Roosters.
