= Phil Joseph =

Welsh rugby league footballer (born 1985)

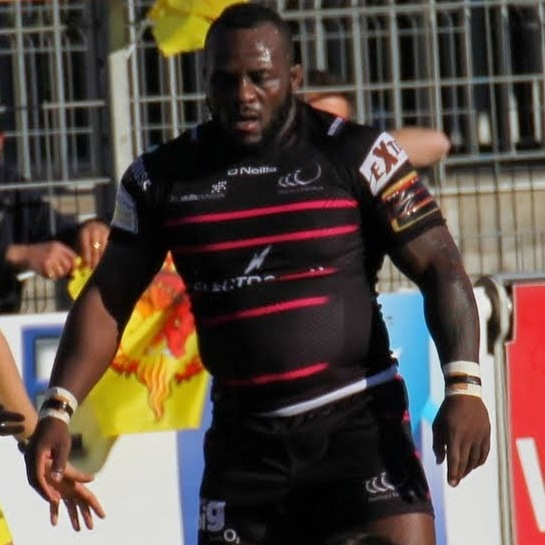

Personal information
- Full name: Philip Joseph
- Born: 10 January 1985 (age 41) Huddersfield, West Yorkshire, England

Playing information
- Height: 5 ft 9 in (1.75 m)
- Weight: 17 st 7 lb (111 kg)
- Position: Prop, Hooker, Second-row, Loose forward
Club
| Years | Team | Pld | T | G | FG | P |
|---|---|---|---|---|---|---|
| 2004 | Huddersfield Giants | 16 | 0 | 0 | 0 | 0 |
| 2005 | Swinton Lions | 29 | 11 | 1 | 0 | 46 |
| 2006 | Hull Kingston Rovers | 19 | 7 | 0 | 0 | 28 |
| 2007 | Halifax | 28 | 9 | 0 | 0 | 36 |
| 2008–09 | Oldham | 55 | 16 | 1 | 0 | 66 |
| 2010–11 | Swinton Lions | 41 | 22 | 0 | 0 | 88 |
| 2012 | Bradford Bulls | 6 | 0 | 0 | 0 | 0 |
| 2013–15 | Widnes Vikings | 54 | 2 | 0 | 0 | 8 |
| 2015(loan) | → Whitehaven | 3 | 0 | 0 | 0 | 0 |
| 2016 | Salford Red Devils | 14 | 0 | 0 | 0 | 0 |
| 2016(loan) | → North Wales Crusaders | 1 | 1 | 0 | 0 | 4 |
| 2017 | Workington Town | 6 | 2 | 0 | 0 | 8 |
| | Total | 272 | 70 | 2 | 0 | 284 |
Representative
| Years | Team | Pld | T | G | FG | P |
| 2005–17 | Wales | 14 | 1 | 0 | 0 | 4 |

Philip Joseph (born 10 January 1985) is a former Wales international rugby league footballer. He played at club level for Huddersfield, Hull Kingston Rovers, Halifax, Oldham, Swinton and the Bradford Bulls, as a prop, hooker, second-row or loose forward.

== Background ==
Phil Joseph was born in Huddersfield, West Yorkshire, England.

== Bradford ==
After being on trial for several months Joseph earned himself a one-year deal at Super League club Bradford Bulls.

Joseph featured in three of the four pre-season friendlies. He played against Castleford, Dewsbury and Hull F.C. Phil scored a try against Dewsbury.

Joseph made his début in Round 3 (Wigan). He also featured in two consecutive games from Round 4 (Wakefield Trinity) to Round 5 (Warrington). He featured in two consecutive games from Round 9 (Hull F.C.) to Round 10 (Leeds). He was injured for Rounds 11-22 and Rounds 4-5 of the Challenge Cup. Joseph played in Round 27 (Catalans Dragons).

He was released at the end of the season.

== Widnes ==
=== 2013 ===
Joseph featured in the Boxing Day friendly against Warrington he started at hooker in the 30–22 loss.

He featured in two consecutive games from Round 1 (London Broncos) to Round 2 (St. Helens). He next appeared in Round 6 (Bradford Bulls) and then Round 8 (Wigan). He played in Round 10 (Huddersfield) and Round 12 (Castleford) to Round 17 (Catalans Dragons). Joseph played in Round 19 (Bradford Bulls) to Round 21 (Wakefield Trinity). Then again in Round 23 (Hull F.C.) to Round 27 (Salford). He also featured in the Challenge Cup against Doncaster, Workington Town and Wigan. He scored against Wakefield Trinity (1 try).

=== 2014 ===
Joseph featured in Round 1 (London Broncos) to Round 3 (Salford). He also featured in Round 6 (Hull F.C.) to Round 8 (Catalans Dragons). Then in Round 13 (Salford).

On 30 April 2014, Phil signed a new 2-year deal to stay with Widnes.

== Statistics ==
| Season | Appearance | Tries | Goals | D/G | Points |
|---|---|---|---|---|---|
| 2012 Bradford | 6 | 0 | 0 | 0 | 0 |
| 2013 Widnes | 23 | 1 | 0 | 0 | 4 |
| 2014 Widnes | 8 | 1 | 0 | 0 | 4 |
| 2015 Widnes | 5 | 0 | 0 | 0 | 0 |
| Total | 42 | 2 | 0 | 0 | 8 |

== International honours ==
Phil Joseph won caps for Wales while at Hull Kingston Rovers and Halifax 2005-07 - 7 (6?)-caps 1-try 4-points.

In October 2015, Phil played for Wales in the 2015 European Cup.

In October 2016, Phil played for Wales in the 2017 World Cup qualifiers.
