= Justin Morgan (rugby league) =

Australian professional RL coach and former Wales international rugby league footballer

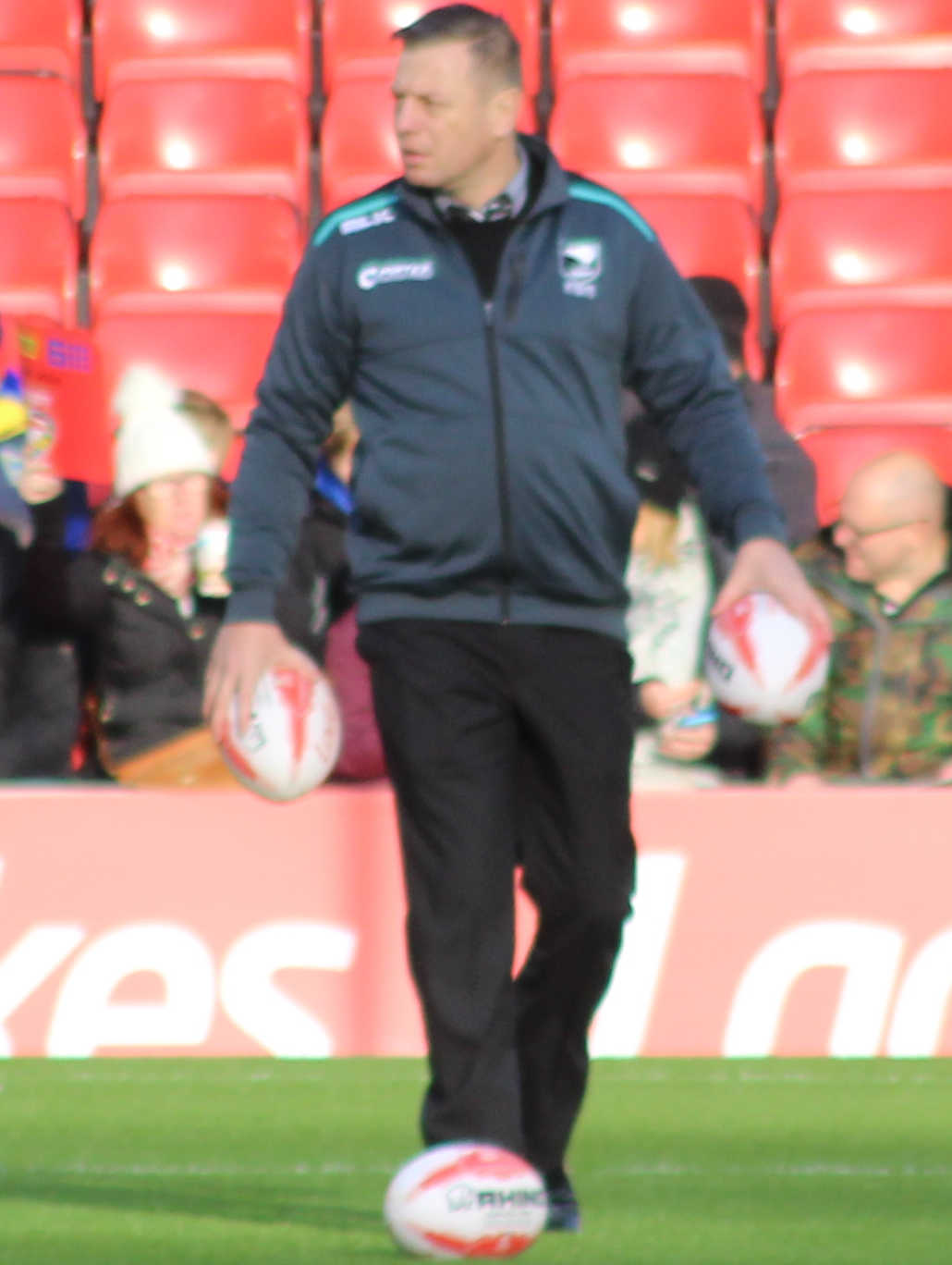

Personal information
- Born: 2 August 1975 (age 50) Sydney, New South Wales, Australia

Playing information
- Height: 190 cm (6 ft 3 in)
- Weight: 105 kg (16 st 7 lb)
- Position: Prop, Second-row
Club
Years	Team	Pld	T	G	FG	P
1994–99	Parramatta Eels	83	10	0	0	40
2000	Canberra Raiders	22	0	0	0	0
2001–02	New Zealand Warriors	28	3	0	0	12
	Total	133	13	0	0	52
Representative
Years	Team	Pld	T	G	FG	P
2000–03	Wales	9	0	0	0	0

Coaching information
Club
Years	Team	Gms	W	D	L	W%
2002–05	Toulouse Olympique
2005–11	Hull Kingston Rovers	178	99	3	76	56
	Total	178	99	3	76	56
Representative
Years	Team	Gms	W	D	L	W%
2018–20	New Zealand (Women)

Justin Morgan (born 2 August 1975) is a former Wales international rugby league footballer who played as a prop in the 1990s and 2000s. He later became a professional coach in the 2000s and 2010s. He has been an assistant coach of the New Zealand Warriors and the New Zealand Kiwis. He continues to work as a commentator.

== Background ==
Justin Morgan was born in Sydney, New South Wales, Australia.

== Playing career ==
Morgan's career started with the Parramatta Eels. He later played for the Canberra Raiders, and, more famously, with the New Zealand Warriors who made the 2002 National Rugby League Grand Final after winning the Minor Premiership. He retired from playing at the age of 26.

== Coaching career ==
=== Toulouse Olympique ===
After his appointment in 2002, Morgan rose to prominence as coach of French club Toulouse Olympique in 2005, when they defeated Widnes Vikings 40–24 to reach the Rugby League Challenge Cup semi-finals. Having subsequently agreed to take over at Hull KR, he remained at Toulouse throughout July to oversee their semi-final against Leeds Rhinos.

=== Hull Kingston Rovers ===
In August 2005, Morgan was appointed head coach of Hull Kingston Rovers. It was a poor end to 2005 for Rovers after winning the Northern Rail Cup against Castleford Tigers as they were dumped out of the play-offs at home to Halifax.

The 2006 season however was far better for Morgan. His side lost just two games out of the eighteen they played that year, finishing top and then beat Widnes Vikings 29–22 to advance to the Grand Final at the Halliwell Jones Stadium in Warrington. They then beat the Vikings 29–16 which guaranteed promotion to Super League for 2007. On the cup front, Rovers achieved a huge upset in the quarter finals of the Challenge Cup to Super League side Warrington Wolves, running out 40–36 winners on the day. Rovers however reliquinshed their hold on the Northern Rail Cup as Leigh Centurions beat them 22–18 at Bloomfield Road, Blackpool in the final.

In their first year in Super League, Rovers started well, winning four out of their first five games including wins over Wigan Warriors and Leeds Rhinos. They led the table after victory over the Rhinos. Speculation over Morgan's future intensified as Leeds Rhinos Tony Smith, the new Great Britain Lions coach, and rumour had it that Morgan was being lined up as a replacement. However, on 18 April 2006, Morgan committed himself to the club until at least 2010, two years more than his previous contract stated.

=== Assistant coaching roles ===
In 2008, Morgan was appointed as an assistant coach for the Wales national team, working alongside John Dixon and Iestyn Harris.

Morgan signed on as an assistant coach to the Canberra Raiders for the 2012 and 2013 seasons, replacing Quentin Pongia.

In 2014 Morgan joined Melbourne Storm as an assistant coach.

Morgan re-joined the New Zealand Warriors for the 2016 season, as an assistant coach.

On 28 September 2016 he was announced as an assistant coach to the New Zealand national rugby league team.
