= Dave Wilson (rugby league) =

English rugby league footballer

Personal information
- Full name: Dave Wilson
- Born: 30 September 1984 (age 41) Kingston upon Hull, England
- Height: 5 ft 10 in (1.78 m)
- Weight: 14 st 0 lb (89 kg)

Playing information
- Position: Wing, Prop
Club
Years	Team	Pld	T	G	FG	P
2003–07	Hull Kingston Rovers	13	0	0	0	0

Dave Wilson (born 30 September 1984) is an English rugby league footballer who has played in the 2000s and 2010s. He has played at club level for Skirlaugh A.R.L.F.C., Hull Kingston Rovers and the Mackay Magpies, as a wing or Prop.

== Background ==
Wilson was born in Kingston upon Hull, Humberside.

== Career ==
Wilson started his career at amateur club Skirlaugh A.R.L.F.C. (in Skirlaugh, East Riding of Yorkshire, of the National Conference League), before moving to Hull Kingston Rovers in 2003.

After playing in the Under-21 team, playing as a prop, Wilson made his first-team début as a wing against Strella Kazan in the Challenge Cup 3rd round, at the age of 18.

After leaving Hull Kingston Rovers in 2009 he moved to Australia where he has played for several teams including Mackay Magpies.
