= Ben Fisher =

Former Scotland international rugby league footballer

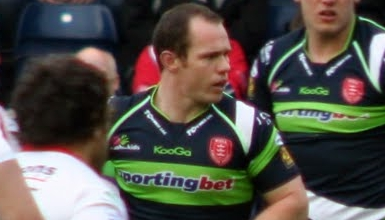

Personal information
- Full name: Benjamin Thomas Fisher
- Born: 4 February 1981 (age 45) Camperdown, New South Wales, Australia

Playing information
- Height: 173 cm (5 ft 8 in)
- Weight: 82 kg (12 st 13 lb)
- Position: Hooker
Club
Years	Team	Pld	T	G	FG	P
2004–05	Halifax	31	17	0	0	68
2006–11	Hull Kingston Rovers	165	33	0	0	132
2012	Catalans Dragons	15	2	0	0	8
2013	London Broncos	24	1	0	0	4
	Total	235	53	0	0	212
Representative
Years	Team	Pld	T	G	FG	P
2004–13	Scotland	14	7	0	0	28

Benjamin Thomas Fisher (born 4 February 1981), also known by the nickname of "Fish", is a former Scotland international rugby league footballer who was player-assistant coach for the London Broncos in the Super League. A Scotland international representative Hooker, he previously played for Hull Kingston Rovers of Super League, and Halifax.

== Club career ==
=== Halifax RLFC ===
Fisher signed for Halifax from North Sydney Bears in November 2004 and the Sydney-born number nine, has a British passport so is not an overseas quota player. Ben spent three seasons on the books of the Sydney Roosters before joining the Bears in 2001, and won the club's "Best and Fairest" player award. In 31 appearances in 2005 season for Halifax he scored 17 tries. He is one of Rovers' growing band of internationals, being a member of the Scotland squad.

=== Hull KR ===
In May 2008 Ben signed an extension to his contract keeping him at Hull Kingston Rovers until the end of 2011.

== International ==
=== Scotland ===
He was named in the Scotland training squad for the 2008 Rugby League World Cup.

He was named in the Scotland squad for the 2008 Rugby League World Cup.

In 2010 he represented Scotland in the Alitalia European Cup.
