= Damien Couturier =

France international rugby league footballer

Personal information
- Full name: Damien Couturier
- Born: 9 July 1981 (age 43); L'Union, Haute-Garonne, France

Playing information
- Position: Centre
Club
Years	Team	Pld	T	G	FG	P
2004–05	Toulouse Olympique
2005–06	Hull Kingston Rovers	28	9	86	0	208
2007	Leigh Centurions	16	9	61	0	158
2007–14	Toulouse Olympique
	Total	44	18	147	0	366
Representative
Years	Team	Pld	T	G	FG	P
2004–06	France	3	2	0	0	4

Damien Couturier (born 9 July 1981 in L'Union) is a French former professional rugby league footballer who played in the 2000s and 2010s, and has coached in the 2010s. He played in the Championship for Hull Kingston Rovers, Leigh Centurions and Toulouse Olympique, and at international level for France. He was a goal-kicking centre whose most notable achievement as a player was helping Hull Kingston Rovers achieve promotion to Super League in 2006.

Following the end of his playing career, Couturier became assistant coach of Toulouse Olympique.
