= Leroy Rivett =

Former English rugby footballer

Personal information
- Born: 17 December 1976 (age 49) Leicester, England
- Height: 5 ft 8 in (1.73 m)

Playing information

Rugby league
- Position: Wing
Club
Years	Team	Pld	T	G	FG	P
1995–00	Leeds Rhinos	68	30	0	0	120
1998 (loan)	→ Bramley	7	5	0	0	20
2000	Huddersfield Giants	6	1	0	0	4
2001	Keighley Cougars	3	2	0	0	8
2002	Warrington Wolves	9	1	0	0	4
2002 (loan)	→ Chorley Lynx	3	2	0	0	8
2002 (loan)	→ Doncaster Dragons	4	0	0	0	0
2003	Leigh Centurions	27	17	0	0	68
2004	Villefranche
2005–06	Hull Kingston Rovers	44	16	0	0	64
2007	Leigh Centurions	27	9	0	0	36
2008–09	Rochdale Hornets	25	12	0	0	48
	Total	223	95	0	0	380

Rugby union
- Position: Wing
Club
Years	Team	Pld	T	G	FG	P
2001	Sale Sharks
2004	Otley
	Total	0	0	0	0	0

Leroy Rivett (born 17 December 1976) is an English former professional rugby league and rugby union footballer who played in the 1990s and 2000s. He played club level rugby league (RL) for Leeds Rhinos, Bramley (loan), Huddersfield Giants, Keighley Cougars, Warrington Wolves, Chorley Lynx (loan), Doncaster Dragons (loan), Leigh Centurions (two spells), Villefranche, Hull Kingston Rovers and Rochdale Hornets, as a wing, and club level rugby union (RU) for Sale Sharks and Otley R.U.F.C., as wing.

== Background ==
Leroy Rivett was born in Leicester, England.

== Playing career ==
Leroy Rivett's amateur career began for the Leeds side Pendas Panthers (now known as Whinmoor Warriors) for the under-eleven age-group, but he soon moved to play for East Leeds, where he joined numerous other future professionals in a very strong junior team. As this team grew older, it won numerous trophies, most notably the British Amateur Rugby League Association National Youth League and National Youth Cup double in 1995. In September 1995, he joined Leeds Rhinos.

Rivett rose to prominence towards the end of the season, helping Leeds reach the 1998 Super League Grand Final by scoring two tries in the final eliminator of the Super League play-offs against St. Helens. He played on the wing for the final in the 10–4 defeat by Wigan Warriors.

Rivett is perhaps best known for his performance for Leeds Rhinos in the Rugby League Challenge Cup Final at Wembley Stadium in 1999 when he grabbed four tries against London Broncos and walked away with the Lance Todd Trophy as man of the match.

Leroy Rivett made his début for Warrington Wolves on Friday 19 April 2002, and he played his last match for Warrington Wolves on Saturday 22 June 2002.
