= Ben Cockayne =

English rugby league footballer

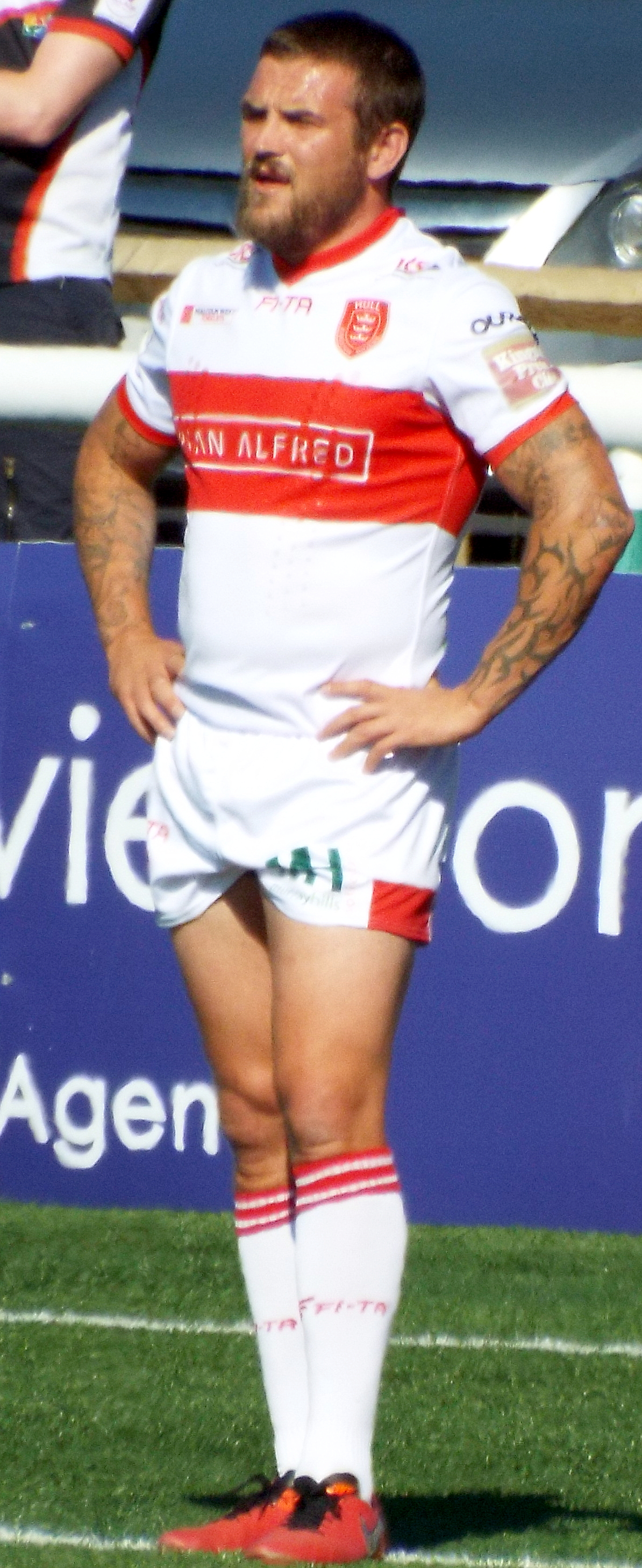

Personal information
- Born: 20 July 1983 (age 42); Pontefract, West Yorkshire, England

Playing information
- Height: 5 ft 9 in (175 cm)
- Weight: 13 st 12 lb (88 kg)
- Position: Fullback, Wing
Club
| Years | Team | Pld | T | G | FG | P |
|---|---|---|---|---|---|---|
| 2004 | Hunslet Hawks | 2 | 0 | 0 | 0 | 0 |
| 2005 | Doncaster RLFC | 22 | 17 | 6 | 0 | 80 |
| 2006–11 | Hull Kingston Rovers | 139 | 57 | 2 | 0 | 232 |
| 2011 | Featherstone Rovers | 9 | 11 | 0 | 0 | 44 |
| 2012–13 | Wakefield Trinity Wildcats | 56 | 28 | 2 | 0 | 116 |
| 2014–17 | Hull Kingston Rovers | 93 | 21 | 18 | 0 | 120 |
| 2018–19 | York City Knights | 35 | 13 | 0 | 0 | 52 |
| 2021–22 | Doncaster RLFC | 19 | 2 | 0 | 0 | 8 |
| | Total | 375 | 149 | 28 | 0 | 652 |

Ben Cockayne (born 20 July 1983) is an English former rugby league footballer who usually played as a fullback or on the wing. He is most remembered for his two spells with Hull Kingston Rovers, with whom he won two promotions to the Super League, in 2006 and 2017, respectively. He also played for Hunslet Hawks, Doncaster RLFC, Featherstone Rovers, Wakefield Trinity Wildcats and York City Knights.

== Background ==
Cockayne was born in Pontefract, West Yorkshire, England.

== Career ==
=== Doncaster ===
Ben started his rugby league career with his local amateur club Normanton Knights. He had some trials with Super League sides such as Wakefield Trinity and Castleford. He was then given a chance to play for Doncaster in National League One on a trial basis by St. John Ellis who was then the coach of Doncaster.

=== Hull Kingston Rovers ===
After impressing for Doncaster, especially against Hull Kingston Rovers in 2005 at Craven Park, Cockayne signed for Hull Kingston Rovers whilst they were in National League One. During the 2006 season, Cockayne was a first team regular in the squad, playing 29 games and helping his side to promotion by scoring 27 tries. He came second in the ranks for top try-scorer for Hull Kingston Rovers in 2006, and was Man-of-the-Match in the Robins' memorable game that saw them be promoted to Super League.

In the 2006 season, Hull Kingston Rovers won the Rugby League National League One competition and were promoted to the Super League competition for the 2007 season.

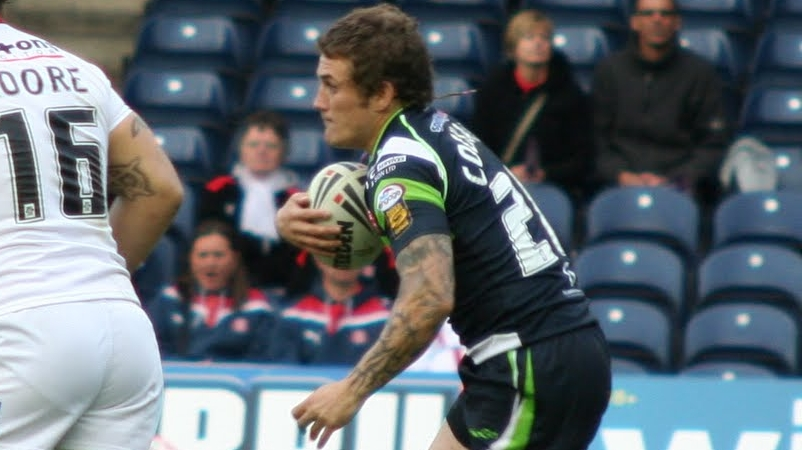
Cockayne playing for Hull KR

He left in July 2011 following a suspension for a number of off-field incidents.

=== Featherstone Rovers ===
The departure from Hull KR came just after the closure of the Super League signing deadline, so Cockayne signed for Championship side Featherstone Rovers until the end of the season. On 2 October 2011 Featherstone won the Championship Grand Final, and later that month Cockayne signed with Wakefield Trinity.

=== Wakefield Trinity ===
Cockayne initially signed a one-year contract with Wakefield which was extended with a two-year deal and he went on to play 45 times for Trinity. However, in 2013 Wakefield Trinity were forced to sell players to pay off debts and Cockayne moved back to Hull Kingston Rovers at the end of 2013.

=== Hull Kingston Rovers ===
In the 2014 season, Cockayne transferred to Hull Kingston Rovers, where he replaced Eden as Rovers' regular Full Back. Regarded by many as a terrace hero during his first stint at Hull Kingston Rovers, he became a fans' favourite once again due to his form during his second stint.

=== York City Knights ===
In September 2017 it was announced that Cockayne had signed to play for York City Knights in the 2018 season.

== Controversy ==
In 2009 Cockayne was found guilty of actual bodily harm after CCTV footage showed him punching and kicking a man in the head. Cockayne was given a 51 week jail sentence suspended for 2 years. He was also ordered to complete 240 hours of community service.

In April 2011, Cockayne allegedly posted racist comments on Facebook. Cockayne's Facebook profile was removed within hours of the Mirror newspaper contacting his club and the Rugby Football League. A Hull Kingston Rovers spokesman said: "The club will be carrying out a full internal investigation into comments allegedly made on a website by Ben Cockayne. Nobody will be commenting further until that has concluded." The Rugby Football League, which has a Kick Racism into Touch campaign, said: "We will be speaking to Hull Kingston Rovers about a potential social media matter." Cockayne was fined by Hull KR, but faced no further punishment from the police after dropping their own investigation of the incident.

== Retirement ==
In June 2019, Cockayne called time on his rugby playing career at the age of 35, but came out of retirement two years later to sign for Doncaster R.L.F.C. in RFL League 1. In July 2022, he left Doncaster to take up a coaching role at York City Knights.
