= Dwayne Barker =

English rugby league footballer (born 1983)

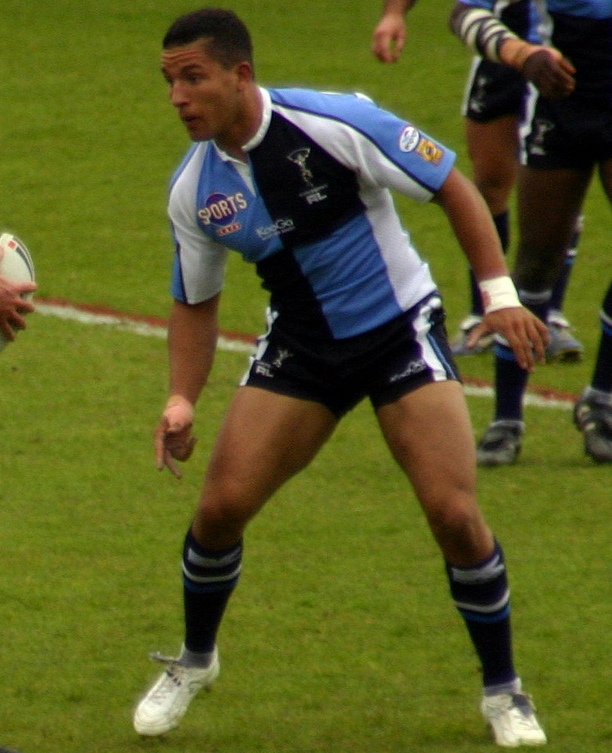

Personal information
- Full name: Dwayne Barker
- Born: 21 September 1983 (age 43) Leeds, England
- Height: 183 cm (6 ft 0 in)
- Weight: 99 kg (15 st 8 lb)

Playing information
- Position: Second-row, Loose forward, Centre
Club
Years	Team	Pld	T	G	FG	P
2002–04	Leeds Rhinos	0	0	0	0	0
2002(loan)	→ Hunslet Hawks	2	0	0	0	0
2003(loan)	→ Hull F.C.	1	0	0	0	0
2004(loan)	→ London Broncos	3	1	0	0	4
2004(loan)	→ Hull Kingston Rovers	2	0	0	0	0
2005–06	Hull Kingston Rovers	46	8	0	0	32
2007	Castleford Tigers	26	17	0	0	68
2008	Harlequins RL	10	1	0	0	4
2008(loan)	→ London Skolars	1	0	0	0	0
2009	Halifax	17	8	0	0	32
2009	Featherstone Rovers	5	1	0	0	4
2012	Dewsbury Rams	14	2	0	0	8
	Total	127	38	0	0	152
- Source: As of 3 December 2017

Dwayne Barker (born 21 September 1983) is an English former professional rugby league footballer. Barker's usual position was second-row, he could also operate in the centres.

Barker has previously played for the Leeds Rhinos, Hull Kingston Rovers, and the Castleford Tigers. He has also enjoyed short loan spells with the London Broncos and Hull FC.

== Background ==
Barker was born in Leeds, West Yorkshire, England.

== Early career ==
Barker had played much of his early career at stand-off or loose forward.

He captained the Rhinos Academy to victory in the 2001 Grand Final against Wigan. He signed for the club from the local amateur team Milford ARLFC in 1999. He has played in multiple positions, including on the wing.

== Controversy ==
Dwayne Barker was ordered to do 150 hours of community service following an incident outside a Leeds nightclub in July 2002.

Chev Walker and Ryan Bailey were sent to young offenders institutions for their involvement in a city centre brawl. Walker was sentenced to 18 months whilst his then Leeds teammate Bailey was given nine months' detention after an incident outside a Leeds nightclub in July 2002. Rochdale Hornets player Paul Owen was gaoled for 15 months.

All four pleaded guilty to violent disorder at a previous hearing.

The court heard how the brawl began after Owen was said to have been tricked into handing over his mobile phone to an unidentified woman outside Creation nightclub. As he tried to recover it, the Leeds players thought she was being assaulted and set about Owen.

A four-minute video of the brawl was played which showed the Leeds players trading kicks and blows with Owen. At one point Owen was seen to punch Barker to the ground and as he struggled to regain his feet he was kicked in the head and knocked out.

The judge said Barker had played a limited role in the violence.

== Harlquins RL ==
Dwayne Barker signed a 12-month contract with Harlequins RL for 2008's Super League XIII season.
