= Gareth Morton =

Scotland international rugby league footballer

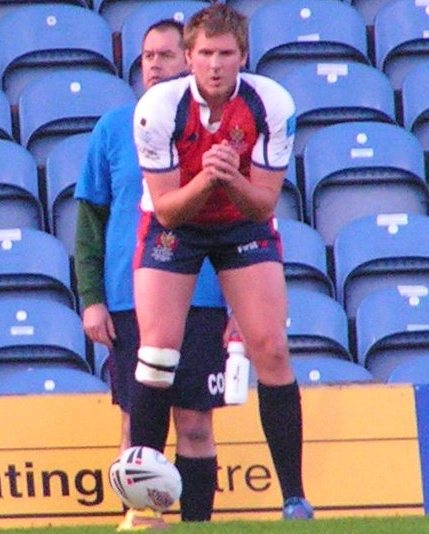

Personal information
- Full name: Gareth Morton
- Born: 21 October 1982 (age 43) Perth, Scotland
- Height: 6 ft 6 in (1.98 m)
- Weight: 16 st 12 lb (107 kg)

Playing information

Rugby league
- Position: Centre, Second-row
Club
Years	Team	Pld	T	G	FG	P
2001–02	Leeds Rhinos	2	0	0	0	0
2005–07	Hull Kingston Rovers	51	23	210	0	512
2007	Oldham	7	4	29	0	74
2008	Doncaster	5	0	11	0	22
2008	Widnes Vikings	6	1	0	0	4
	Total	71	28	250	0	612
Representative
Years	Team	Pld	T	G	FG	P
2001–08	Scotland	4	0	5	0	10

Rugby union
- Position: Full-back / Centre
Club
Years	Team	Pld	T	G	FG	P
2002–05	Border Reivers	27	6	13	0	62
2007–08	Venezia Mestre	11	2	0	0	10
	Total	38	8	13	0	72

Gareth Morton (21 October 1982) is a Scottish former professional rugby league footballer. He last played for the WA Reds in the 2009 Bundaberg Red Cup rugby league competition in Australia.

He has previously played for the Leeds Rhinos, Hull Kingston Rovers, Oldham RLFC, Doncaster RLFC, Widnes Vikings, WA Reds and Scotland.

== Background ==
Morton was born in Perth, Scotland.

== Career ==
Morton switched codes to play rugby union for Scottish Borders. Morton was called up to the senior Scotland union squad for the 2004 Six Nations Championship.

He was released by Hull KR on 17 September 2007.

He has been named in the Scotland training squad for the 2008 Rugby League World Cup.

He has been named in the Scotland squad for the 2008 Rugby League World Cup.
