= Jon Goddard =

English rugby league footballer (born 1982)

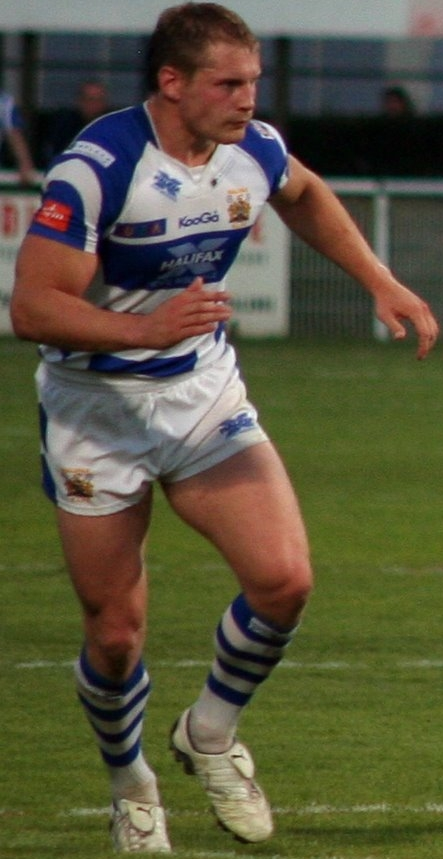

Personal information
- Full name: Jonathon Goddard
- Born: 21 June 1982 (age 43) Pontefract, West Yorkshire, England

Playing information
- Position: Fullback, Centre
Club
Years	Team	Pld	T	G	FG	P
2000–01	Castleford Tigers	2	0	0	0	0
2002–05	Oldham	111	35	0	0	140
2006–07	Hull Kingston Rovers	53	24	0	0	96
2008–11	Halifax	73	27	0	0	108
	Total	239	86	0	0	344

Jonathan Goddard (born 21 June 1982) is an English former professional rugby league footballer.

He played for amateur clubs Smawthorne Panthers and Castleford Panthers before playing for Castleford Tigers, Oldham, Hull Kingston Rovers and Halifax RLFC.

He signed for Hull Kingston Rovers in November 2005, he was released by Hull Kingston Rovers on 17 September 2007, but he was quickly signed up by Halifax. In September 2009, he was re-signed by Halifax to a 2-year contract until the end of 2011. He retired in 2011 due to injury problems.

In April 2014, Goddard signed as a fitness instructor for Doncaster's health club Eco Fitness. He later signed with Penryn RFC in May 2016 as fitness coach.

== Background ==
Jonathan Goddard was born in Pontefract, West Yorkshire, England.
