= Byron Ford =

Australian rugby league footballer

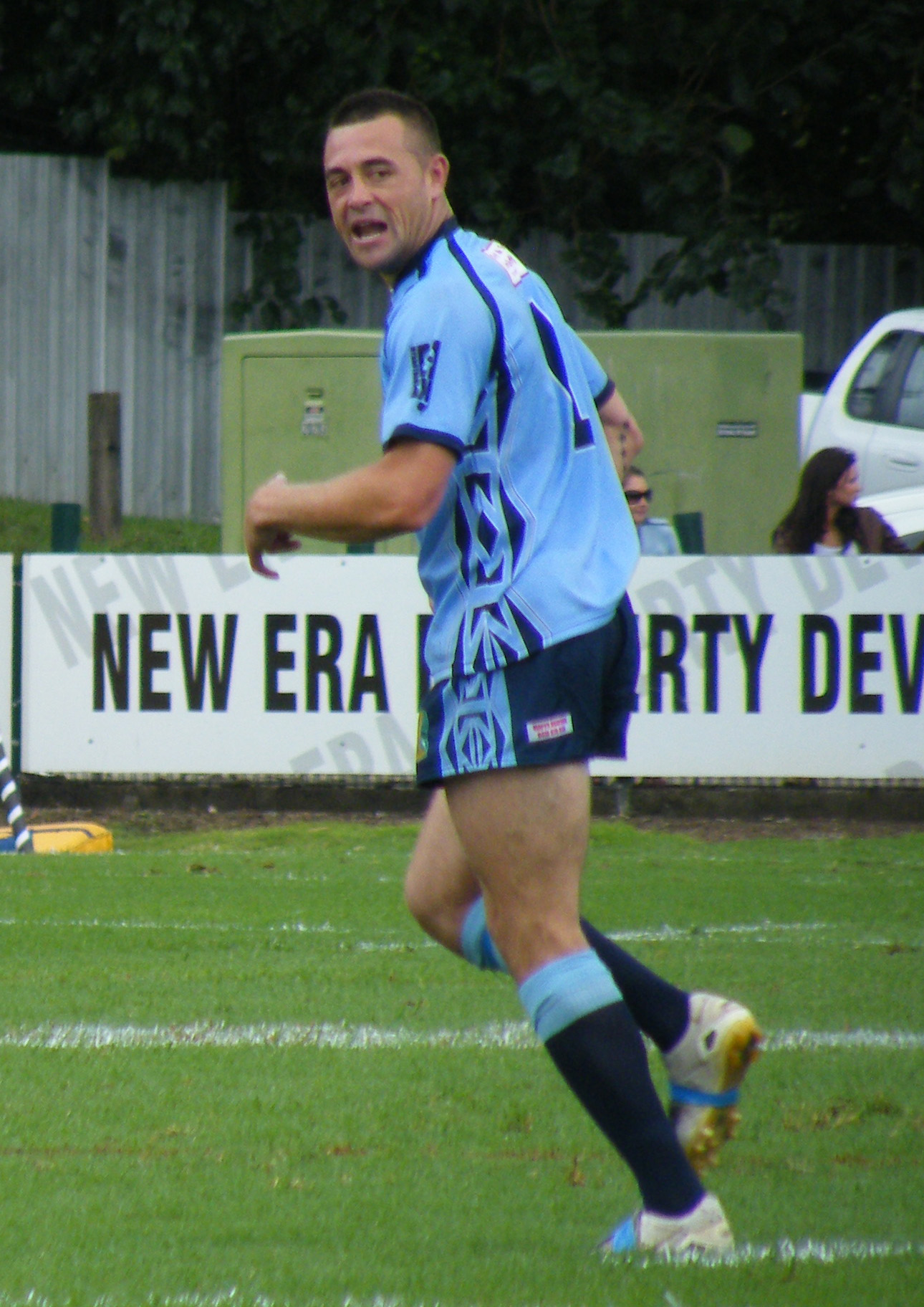
- Byron Ford playing for the Cook Islands

Personal information
- Full name: Byron James Ford
- Born: 8 January 1982 (age 44) Sydney, New South Wales, Australia
- Height: 188 cm (6 ft 2 in)
- Weight: 91 kg (14 st 5 lb)

Playing information
- Position: Wing
Club
Years	Team	Pld	T	G	FG	P
2005–07	Hull Kingston Rovers	57	31	0	0	232
2007–08	Oldham	10	12	0	0	48
	Total	67	43	0	0	280
Representative
Years	Team	Pld	T	G	FG	P
2003–07	Cook Islands	7	2	0	0	8
2008	NSW Residents	1	1	0	0	4
- Source: As of 9 January 2024

Byron James Ford is an Australian former professional rugby league footballer who last played for Newtown in the second tier NSW Cup competition in which he played for them in the 2008 NSW Cup grand final. He previously played in England with Hull Kingston Rovers and Oldham, helping the Roughyeds get to the 2007 National League Two Grand Final. He was to join the Newcastle Knights in 2009 on a 2-year contract but was banned from playing rugby league until June 2010.

He also represented the Cook Islands rugby league team on several occasions after qualifying to play for them via the parent rule.

He is also a member of the Maroubra surf gang the Bra Boys.
