= Pat Weisner =

Former Ireland international rugby league footballer

Personal information
- Full name: Patrick Weisner
- Born: 17 March 1982 (age 44) Sydney, New South Wales, Australia

Playing information
- Position: Hooker, Stand-off, Scrum-half, Loose forward
Club
Years	Team	Pld	T	G	FG	P
2003–04	Leigh Centurions	30	22	47	6	188
2004–06	Halifax	52	34	80	10	306
2006	Harlequins RL	19	7	0	0	28
2007	Hull Kingston Rovers	20	7	14	3	59
2008	Barrow Raiders	20	15	50	4	164
	Total	141	85	191	23	745
Representative
Years	Team	Pld	T	G	FG	P
2004	Ireland	3	2	12	4	36

Coaching information
Representative
Years	Team	Gms	W	D	L	W%
2016–19	Niue	7	6	0	1	86
- As of 10 September 2024

Patrick Weisner (born 17 March 1982) is a professional rugby league coach and a former professional rugby league footballer who played for Ireland at international level.

== Background ==
Weisner was born in Sydney, New South Wales, Australia.

== Playing career ==
A junior for the Canterbury-Bankstown Bulldogs, Weisner played in their 2000 Jersey Flegg Cup team alongside Braith Anasta and Roy Asotasi. He was a part of three consecutive Grand Final wins for The Bulldogs in 1999, 2000 and 2001 in Jersey Flegg Cup and NSW Cup competitions.

In England, Weisner played for the Leigh Centurions, Halifax, Harlequins RL, Barrow Raiders and Hull Kingston Rovers.

In 2005 he was named in The Championships dream team of the year as Loose forward. In 2005 he was Halifax's youngest ever captain.

He also represented Ireland, kicking 3 drop goals on début vs Wales in a Man of the Match performance. He played in three matches at the 2004 European Nations Cup including the European Nations Cup Final vs England at Warrington.

Weisner later played for the Blacktown Workers, captaining their Ron Massey Cup side.

== Coaching career ==
In 2015 Weisner was appointed as the Blacktown Workers's football director and co-coach of the Ron Massey Cup side. The club entered a team into the 2017 Intrust Super Premiership NSW in partnership with the Manly-Warringah Sea Eagles, and Weisner was appointed as coach. In 2018 he was appointed Head Coach of the Asquith Magpies Ron Massey Cup team.

On 27 October 2018 he coached Niue in their 32–36 defeat to Italy staged in Sydney a week after guiding NIUE to the Emerging Nations World Cup Final.

In 2021 he was appointed assistant coach and head of recruitment at the North Sydney Bears NSW Cup team. In November 2023 after Jason Taylor left to become assistant head coach at Canterbury, Weisner was appointed as the new head coach at the North Sydney Club.

On 22 August 2024, Weisner was deregistered by the NSWRL until 1 January 2026. After Weisner's ban ends he would then need to re-apply for his coaching registration.
