= List of Hull Kingston Rovers players =

Hull Kingston Rovers is an English rugby league club, and prior to the 1897–98 (being elected to the Yorkshire Senior Competition for the 1899–1900), it was a rugby union (RU) club, who have had numerous notable players (1,310 (excludes pre-1895 season Rugby Football Union players) as of 20 June 2024) throughout their history, each player of the rugby league era who has played (and so excludes non-playing substitutes) in a competitive first-class match (including those matches that were subsequently abandoned, expunged or re-played, but excluding friendlies) is included.

== Players ==
Last updated: 3 September 2026

| Heritage No. | Name | Dates | Position | Apps | Tries | Goals | DG | Points | Representative | Notes |
|---|---|---|---|---|---|---|---|---|---|---|
| 1205 | Jordan Abdull | 2017; 2020-present | Stand-off | 78 | 23 | 60 | 2 | 206 | England | |
| 295 | Seth Ablett | 1922–23 | | 2 | 0 | 0 | 0 | 0 | | |
| 639 | Alvin Ackerley | 1959-62 | Hooker | 100 | 3 | 0 | 0 | 9 | Great Britain; England | |
| 249 | T.M. Ackrill | 1919–20 | | 8 | 1 | 0 | 0 | 3 | | |
| 785 | Alan Ackroyd | 1980 | Prop | 38 | 8 | 7 | 0 | 38 | | |
| 923 | Jonathan Adams | 1995-97 | Wing, Centre, Fullback | 23 | 9 | 0 | 0 | 36 | | |
| 96 | Fred Adamson | | | 1 | 0 | 0 | 0 | 0 | | |
| 1206 | Danny Addy | 2017-19 | Second-row, Loose-forward, Stand-off | 41 | 11 | 0 | 0 | 44 | Scotland | |
| 789 | Allan Agar | 1977-80 | Scrum-half, Stand-off | 113 | 32 | 16 | 18 | 136 | | |
| 771 | Mike Aitchison | | | 0+2 | 0 | 0 | 0 | 0 | | |
| 1032 | Makali Aizue | 2004-09 | Prop, Second-row | 159 | 29 | 0 | 0 | 116 | Papua New Guinea | |
| 948 | Kieran Allen | 1996 | Fullback | 6 | 2 | 0 | 0 | 8 | | |
| 223 | William Allen | | | 2 | 0 | 0 | 0 | 0 | | |
| 1172 | Mitchell Allgood | 2015-16 | Prop, Loose-forward | 42 | 6 | 0 | 0 | 24 | | |
| 156 | C.W. Allinson | | | 13 | 0 | 0 | 0 | 0 | | |
| 1324 | Tom Amone | 2026-present | Prop | 17 | 4 | 0 | 0 | 16 | | |
| 806 | Tim Anchors | | | 1 | 0 | 0 | 0 | 0 | | |
| 833 | Chris Anderson | 1984-85 | Wing | 2 | 0 | 0 | 0 | 0 | | |
| 540 | Matt Anderson | | | 60 | 4 | 0 | 0 | 12 | | |
| 898 | Peter Anderson | 1991-92 | | 2 | 0 | 0 | 0 | 0 | | |
| 1008 | Richard Anderson | 2001 | Wing | 3 | 1 | 0 | 0 | 4 | | |
| 788 | Barry Andrews | 1980? | Stand-off, Centre | 1+3 | 0 | 4 | 0 | 8 | | |
| 989 | Dean Andrews | 2000-05 | Wing | 56 | 8 | 0 | 0 | 32 | | |
| 531 | Walter Annetts | | | 15 | 2 | 0 | 0 | 6 | | |
| 127 | H. Ansell | | | 5 | 1 | 0 | 0 | 3 | | |
| 465 | C. Anson | | | 2 | 0 | 0 | 0 | 0 | | |
| 558 | J. Archer | | | 1 | 0 | 0 | 0 | 0 | | |
| 546 | Ron Armitage | | | 30 | 4 | 2 | 0 | 16 | | |
| 878 | Colin Armstrong | 1988-90 | Prop, Second-row | 52 | 6 | 24 | 2 | 74 | | |
| 203 | R. S. “Dicky” Ascott | | | 13 | 4 | 0 | 0 | 12 | | |
| 984 | Jon Aston | 2000-05 | Prop, Second-row | 72 | 7 | 0 | 0 | 28 | Wales | |
| 87 | C.W. Asquith | | | 4 | 0 | 0 | 0 | 0 | | |
| 1221 | Chris Atkin | 2017-19 | Scrum-half, Stand-off, Hooker | 66 | 15 | 5 | 5 | 75 | | |
| 927 | Gary Atkins | 1994-98 | Centre | 88 | 63 | 0 | 1 | 253 | | |
| 428 | T. Atkinson | | | 19 | 0 | 0 | 0 | 0 | | |
| 444 | Sid Atkinson | | | 63 | 5 | 0 | 0 | 15 | | |
| 520 | G. P. "Pat" Austin | | | 1 | 0 | 0 | 0 | 0 | | |
| 240 | Gilbert Austin | 1919-28 | Fullback, Wing, Centre | 348 | 160 | 28 | 0 | 536 | | |
| 882 | Greg Austin | 1989-90 | Centre | 38 | 45 | 0 | 0 | 180 | | |
| 1289 | Yusuf Aydin | 2023-24 | Prop | 9 | 0 | 0 | 0 | 0 | Turkey | |
| 1183 | Ryan Bailey | 2015 | Prop | 1 | 1 | 0 | 0 | 4 | Great Britain; England | |
| 1047 | Damian Ball | 2004 | Loose-forward | 8 | 2 | 0 | 0 | 8 | | |
| 705 | Greg Ballantyne | | | 35+3 | 12 | 0 | 0 | 36 | | |
| 618 | Peter Bangs | | | 20 | 0 | 0 | 0 | 0 | | |
| 560 | G. Banks | | | 2 | 0 | 0 | 0 | 0 | | |
| 152 | R. Banks | | | 3 | 0 | 0 | 0 | 0 | | |
| 1004 | Graeme Barber | 2001 | | 2 | 0 | 0 | 0 | 0 | | |
| 1241 | Harry Bardle | 2019 | | 1 | 0 | 0 | 0 | 0 | | |
| 1044 | Dwyane Barker | 2004-06 | Second-row, Loose-forward, Centre | 48 | 8 | 0 | 0 | 32 | | |
| 488 | George Barker | | | 62 | 10 | 12 | 0 | 54 | | |
| 896 | Julian Barkworth | 1991-93 | Wing, Centre | 81 | 20 | 4 | 0 | 88 | | |
| 1281 | Connor Barley | 2022-present | Wing, Centre | 4 | 1 | 0 | 0 | 4 | | |
| 161 | Richard Barlow | | | 7 | 0 | 0 | 0 | 0 | | |
| 756 | Ted Barnard | | | 24+7 | 3 | 0 | 0 | 9 | | |
| 477 | Alf Barraclough | | | 24 | 3 | 0 | 0 | 9 | | |
| 502 | Jim Barraclough | <1950->50 | Second-row | 160 | 31 | 0 | 0 | 93 | England | |
| 767 | Lee Barraclough | | | 1+2 | 0 | 0 | 0 | 0 | | |
| 159 | Fred Barron | | | 33 | 8 | 8 | 0 | 40 | | |
| 71 | Jim Barry | 1901–09 | | 208 | 41 | 9 | 0 | 141 | | |
| 592 | Alan Bartliffe | | | 19 | 2 | 2 | 0 | 10 | | |
| 299 | A. Barwick | | | 5 | 0 | 0 | 0 | 0 | | |
| 1285 | James Batchelor | 2023-present | Second-row, Loose-forward | 42 | 10 | 1 | 0 | 42 | | |
| 314 | George Bateman | | | 125 | 65 | 0 | 0 | 195 | | |
| 949 | Karl Bateman | 1997 | | 4 | 0 | 0 | 0 | 0 | | |
| 224 | T. Bateman | | | 12 | 1 | 0 | 0 | 3 | | |
| 684 | John Bath | 1966 | Prop | 43 | 2 | 0 | 0 | 6 | | |
| 353 | William Batten Jr. | | | 95 | 23 | 0 | 0 | 69 | | |
| 938 | Chris Batty | 1995 | Hooker | 3 | 0 | 0 | 0 | 0 | | |
| 1090 | Andreas Bauer | 2007 | Wing, Centre | 13 | 6 | 0 | 0 | 24 | Samoa | |
| 600 | Sid Bays | | | 1 | 0 | 0 | 0 | 0 | | |
| 35 | T. Beadle | | | 3 | 0 | 0 | 0 | 0 | | |
| 61 | A. Beal | | | | | | | | | |
| 844 | Malcolm Beall | 1985-89 | Prop, Second-row | 70 | 5 | 0 | 0 | 20 | | |
| 377 | G. E. Bean | | | 2 | 0 | 0 | 0 | 0 | | |
| 969 | Keith Beauchamp | 1998 | Wing | | | | | | | |
| 384 | Harry Beaumont | | | 89 | 19 | 12 | 0 | 81 | | |
| 383 | Louis Beaumont | 1933–46 | | 202 | 15 | 0 | 0 | 45 | | |
| 1128 | Richard Beaumont | 2011-13 | Prop | 19 | 1 | 0 | 0 | 4 | | |
| 441 | William Beaumont | | | 75 | 24 | 1 | 0 | 74 | | |
| 566 | Brian Beck | | | 68 | 9 | 28 | 0 | 83 | | |
| 610 | Arthur Bedford | | | 10 | 0 | 0 | 0 | 0 | | |
| 439 | Ernie Bedford | | | 47 | 10 | 0 | 0 | 30 | | |
| 132 | M. Bedworth | | | 3 | 0 | 0 | 0 | 0 | | |
| 713 | Arthur Beetson | 1968 | Prop, Second-row | 12 | 1 | 0 | 0 | 3 | Australia | |
| 1153 | Matty Beharrell | 2012-14 | Scrum-half | 1 | 0 | 0 | 0 | 0 | | |
| 102 | George Bell | | | 9 | 2 | 0 | 0 | 6 | | |
| 1027 | Ian Bell | 2003 | Centre | 0+1 | 0 | 0 | 0 | 0 | | |
| 807 | Steve Bell | | | 9 | 2 | 0 | 0 | 6 | | Is this the same person as ex-Catalans Dragons Steven Bell |
| 993 | Scott Bennett | 2000 | | 2 | 0 | 0 | 0 | 0 | | |
| 128 | W. Bent | 1905–06 | | 23 | 0 | 0 | 0 | 0 | | |
| 1115 | Kyle Bibb | 2009 | Prop | 2 | 0 | 0 | 0 | 0 | | Loaned from Wakefield Trinity |
| 902 | Mike Bibby | 1991-99 | Wing, Centre, Stand-off | 75 | 20 | 0 | 0 | 80 | | |
| 241 | Frank Bielby | 1919-28 | Wing, Centre, Second-row | 277 | 79 | 0 | 0 | 237 | | |
| 154 | W. Biggs | | | 43 | 0 | 2 | 0 | 4 | | |
| 482 | H. Bilton | | | 2 | 0 | 0 | 0 | 0 | | |
| 302 | Harold Binks | | | 198 | 13 | 0 | 0 | 39 | | |
| 763 | Ross Birrell | 1973 | Wing, Centre, Fullback | 18 | 2 | 14 | 0 | 34 | | |
| 868 | David Bishop | 1988-91 | Scrum-half | 61 | 8 | 0 | 1 | 35 | Great Britain; Wales | |
| 537 | John Blackburn | | | 10 | 1 | 0 | 0 | 3 | | |
| 190 | Jake Blackmore | 1910 | Forward | 65 | 6 | 0 | 0 | 18 | Wales | |
| 671 | Mike Blackmore | | | 190 | 96 | 6 | 0 | 300 | | |
| 1048 | Matthew Blake | 2004 | Prop | 2 | 0 | 0 | 0 | 0 | | |
| 623 | G. Blakey | | | 2 | 0 | 0 | 0 | 0 | | |
| 1181 | Maurice Blair | 2015-18 | Centre, Stand-off, Scrum-half, Second-row, Loose-forward | 117 | 21 | 1 | 0 | 86 | | |
| 369 | L. Blanchard | | | 62 | 11 | 1 | 0 | 35 | | Is this Lory Blanchard? |
| 979 | Mark Blanchard | 1999-06 | Wing, Centre | 49 | 10 | 0 | 0 | 40 | | |
| 350 | J. Blazier | | | 8 | 1 | 0 | 0 | 3 | | |
| 103 | C.F. Bloodworth | | | 2 | 0 | 0 | 0 | 0 | | |
| 365 | Frank Blossom | | | 76 | 7 | 0 | 0 | 21 | | |
| 271 | Frank Boagey | 1920–27 | Hooker | 218 | 24 | 0 | 0 | 72 | | |
| 261 | Robert Boagey | | | 57 | 2 | 2 | 0 | 10 | | |
| 202 | Pierre Boltman | 1912–13 | | 36 | 7 | 0 | 0 | 21 | | |
| 665 | Ted Bonner | | | 70+2 | 5 | 0 | 0 | 15 | | |
| 144 | Arthur Booth | | | 70 | 30 | 2 | 0 | 94 | | |
| 1319 | Noah Booth | 2025-present | Wing, centre | 10 | 9 | 0 | 0 | 36 | | |
| 991 | Simon Booth | 2000 | Second-row | | | | | | | |
| 881 | Tony Botica | 1989 | Second-row, Loose-forward | 26 | 17 | 0 | 0 | 68 | | |
| 1184 | John Boudebza | 2015-16 | Hooker | 42 | 3 | 0 | 0 | 12 | France | |
| 594 | Tom Bourton | | | 34 | 2 | 0 | 0 | 6 | | |
| 856 | Kerry Boustead | 1985-87 | Centre | 15 | 6 | 0 | 0 | 24 | Australia | |
| 983 | Jamie Bovill | 2000-05 | Prop | 67 | 10 | 0 | 0 | 40 | | |
| 443 | C. Boxall | | | | | | | | | |
| 475 | H. Bowering | | | 12 | 2 | 0 | 0 | 6 | | |
| 184 | Alf Boyd | | | 2 | 1 | 0 | 0 | 3 | | |
| 230 | Frank Boylen | 1914 | Forward | 38 | 1 | 0 | 0 | 3 | Great Britain; England | |
| 1083 | Aaron Bradley | 2006 | | 1 | 0 | 0 | 0 | 0 | | |
| 236 | W. Bradshaw | | | 10 | 0 | 0 | 0 | 0 | | |
| 507 | Bill Bradshaw | 1949-?? | Hooker | 84 | 20 | 93 | 0 | 246 | | Is this the same as ex-Featherstone Rovers Bill Bradshaw? |
| 513 | H. Brady | | | 1 | 0 | 0 | 0 | 0 | | |
| 149 | J. Charles Brain | | | 181 | 74 | 2 | 0 | 226 | | |
| 448 | H. Bratley | | | 17 | 7 | 0 | 0 | 21 | | |
| 201 | S. Brear | | | 5 | 0 | 3 | 0 | 6 | | |
| 280 | E. Brett | | | 12 | 3 | 0 | 0 | 9 | | |
| 348 | H. Brien | | | 35 | 1 | 0 | 0 | 3 | | |
| 1254 | Ryan Brierley | 2020 | Fullback, Scrum-half, Stand-off | 10 | 3 | 8 | 0 | 28 | Scotland | |
| 543 | Dennis Briggs | | | 24 | 3 | 28 | 0 | 65 | | |
| 323 | W. Brigham | | | 7 | 1 | 0 | 0 | 3 | | |
| 336 | Frederick Brindle | <1933-33 | Loose-forward | 108 | 12 | 5 | 0 | 46 | England | |
| 1098 | Shaun Briscoe | 2008–11 | Fullback | 100 | 30 | 0 | 0 | 120 | England | |
| 305 | Ben Britton | | | 332 | 17 | 1 | 0 | 53 | | |
| 1308 | Jack Broadbent | 2024-present | Wing, Centre, Fullback, Stand-off | 62 | 33 | 0 | 0 | 128 | | Initially loaned from Castleford Tigers, then permanent |
| 828 | Mark Broadhurst | 1983-87 | Prop | 95 | 10 | 0 | 0 | 40 | New Zealand | |
| 279 | R. Broderick | | | 14 | 1 | 0 | 0 | 3 | | |
| 256 | A. Bromham | | | 5 | 0 | 0 | 0 | 0 | | |
| 708 | Brian Brook | | | 50 | 10 | 0 | 0 | 30 | | |
| 552 | Laurie Brookfield | | | 69 | 8 | 0 | 0 | 24 | | |
| 1078 | Matty Brooks | 2006-07 | Scrum-half | 5 | 1 | 1 | 0 | 6 | | |
| 496 | Brosnan | 1947–48 | | 1 | 0 | 0 | 0 | 0 | | |
| 1151 | Alex Brown | 2013 | Wing | 16 | 9 | 0 | 0 | 36 | Jamaica | |
| 357 | Charlie Brown | | | 66 | 2 | 0 | 0 | 6 | | |
| 936 | Colin Brown | 1995 | Scrum-half | 11 | 4 | 0 | 0 | 16 | | |
| 967 | Daniel Brown | 1998 | | 2 | 0 | 0 | 0 | 0 | | |
| 146 | Ernest Brown | | | 3 | 1 | 0 | 0 | 3 | | |
| 226 | Harry Brown | | | 5 | 0 | 0 | 0 | 0 | | |
| 913 | Gary Brown | 1992-96 | Wing, Fullback | 73 | 50 | 0 | 0 | 200 | | |
| 457 | J. Brown | 1945–46 | | 3 | 0 | 0 | 0 | 0 | | |
| 1309 | Jack Brown | 2024 | Prop, Loose-forward | 1 | 0 | 0 | 0 | 0 | | |
| 742 | Joe Brown | | | 57+2 | 9 | 17 | 1 | 62 | | |
| 503 | Sam Brown | | | 9 | 2 | 0 | 0 | 6 | | |
| 229 | H. Broxholme | | | 9 | 1 | 0 | 0 | 3 | | |
| 568 | Terry Buckle | | | 82 | 2 | 144 | 0 | 294 | | |
| 259 | H. Bullock | | | 14 | 3 | 0 | 0 | 9 | | |
| 647 | Arthur Bunting | 1959–68 | Scrum-half | 237 | 68 | 1 | 0 | 206 | | |
| 1306 | Joe Burgess | 2024-present | Wing, Centre | 10 | 8 | 0 | 0 | 32 | England | |
| 504 | Ernest Burke | | | 19 | 3 | 1 | 0 | 11 | | |
| 1173 | Greg Burke | 2015 | Prop, Second-row, Loose-forward | 21 | 0 | 0 | 0 | 0 | | Loaned from Wigan Warriors |
| 1152 | Travis Burns | 2013-14 | Stand-off, Scrum-half, Hooker | 49 | 9 | 80 | 2 | 198 | | |
| 514 | G. Burr | | | | | | | | | |
| 814 | Chris Burton | 1981–89 | Second-row | 233 | 25 | 0 | 0 | 89 | Great Britain | |
| 673 | Alan Burwell | 1961–76 | Wing, Centre, Stand-off, Scrum-half | 226 | 106 | 0 | 0 | 318 | Great Britain | |
| 641 | Brian Burwell | | | 93 | 9 | 4 | 0 | 35 | | |
| 855 | Dave Busby | 1986-87 | Second-row | 6 | 2 | 0 | 0 | 8 | | |
| 1030 | Dean Busby | 2003 | Prop, Second-row, Loose-forward | 10 | 1 | 0 | 0 | 4 | England; Wales | |
| 544 | E. Butler | | | 1 | 0 | 0 | 0 | 0 | | |
| 1217 | Jake Butler-Fleming | 2017-18 | Wing, Centre | 9 | 5 | 0 | 0 | 20 | | |
| 1015 | Mark Cain | 2002 | Scrum-half, Stand-off | 18 | 4 | 0 | 0 | 16 | | |
| 394 | J. Cairns | 1934–35 | | 2 | 0 | 0 | 0 | 0 | | |
| 1002 | Darren Callaghan | 2001 | Scrum-half, Stand-off | 7 | 1 | 0 | 0 | 4 | | |
| 1036 | Matt Calland | 2004 | Wing, Centre | 8 | 2 | 0 | 0 | 8 | England | |
| 133 | Charles Calvert | | | | | | | | | |
| 1174 | Terry Campese | 2015-16 | Scrum-half, Stand-off, Loose-forward | 26 | 2 | 4 | 0 | 16 | Australia; Italy | |
| 89 | W.J. Carde | | | 22 | 1 | 1 | 0 | 5 | | |
| 753 | Ray Cardy | | | 2 | 0 | 0 | 0 | 0 | | |
| 1136 | Keal Carlile | 2012-15 | Hooker | 36 | 1 | 0 | 0 | 4 | | |
| 70 | Alf Carmichael | 1910- | | 339 | 12 | 727 | 0 ^² | 1490 | England | |
| 294 | Andrew Carmichael | 1923-29 | Stand-off, Loose-forward | 78 | 15 | 1 | 0 | 47 | | |
| 339 | George Carmichael | 1928-34 | Fullback | 180 | 17 | 288 | 0 ^² | 627 | | |
| 1219 | Justin Carney | 2017-18 | Wing | 21 | 6 | 0 | 0 | 24 | | |
| 1233 | Todd Carney | 2018 | Stand-off, Scrum-half, Fullback | 6 | 0 | 0 | 0 | 0 | Australia | |
| 1145 | Omari Caro | 2013-14 | Wing, Centre, Second-row | 26 | 20 | 0 | 0 | 80 | Jamaica | |
| 246 | Albert Carr | | | 13 | 0 | 0 | 0 | 0 | | |
| 1005 | Colin Carter | 2001 | Stand-off, Scrum-half, Loose-forward | 9 | 3 | 0 | 0 | 12 | | |
| 783 | Len Casey | 1975–78; 1980-85 | Prop, Second-row, Loose-forward | 237 | 19 | 0 | 0 | 61 | Great Britain; England | |
| 1200 | Joe Cator | 2016-18 | Hooker | 17 | 12 | 0 | 0 | 48 | | |
| 854 | Mike Cator | 1985-86 | | 1 | 0 | 0 | 0 | 0 | | |
| 1279 | Charlie Cavanaugh | 2022-present | Hooker | 1 | 0 | 0 | 0 | 0 | | |
| 153 | R.W. Cavill | | | | | | | | | |
| 416 | Jack Cayzer | | | 112 | 30 | 0 | 0 | 90 | | |
| 238 | J. Chadburn | | | 1 | 0 | 0 | 0 | 0 | | |
| 562 | Barry Chalkley | | | 24 | 2 | 24 | 0 | 54 | | |
| 559 | Dennis Chalkley | | | | | | | | | |
| 679 | Leslie Chamberlain | 1963 | Prop, Second-row, Loose-forward | 22 | 2 | 0 | 0 | 6 | | |
| 899 | Richard Chamberlain | 1991-97 | Hooker | 110 | 33 | 0 | 0 | 132 | | |
| 976 | Anthony Chambers | 1999-01 | Wing, Scrum-half | 7 | 2 | 0 | 0 | 8 | | |
| 115 | O. Chambers | | | 26 | 1 | 0 | 0 | 3 | | |
| 399 | Joseph Chambers | 1934–35 | | 3 | 0 | 0 | 0 | 0 | | |
| 1016 | Joe Chambers | 2002 | | | | | | | | |
| 1168 | Jason Chan | 2014 | Prop, Second-row, Centre | 6 | 3 | 0 | 0 | 12 | Papua New Guinea | Loaned from Huddersfield Giants |
| 90 | J. Chant | | | | | | | | | |
| 506 | Herbert Chapman | | | 12 | 3 | 3 | 0 | 15 | | |
| 602 | J. Chapman | | | 5 | 0 | 0 | 0 | 0 | | |
| 287 | H. Chapman | 1921–22 | | 7 | 0 | 1 | 0 | 2 | | |
| 922 | Chris Charles | 1994–02 | Second-row, Loose-forward, Hooker | 231 | 41 | 301 | 3 | 769 | England | |
| 1322 | Jack Charles | 2026-present | Hooker, second-row, loose-forward | 1 | 2 | 0 | 0 | 8 | | |
| 917 | Adam Charlesworth | 1993-96 | Wing, Centre | 41 | 7 | 0 | 0 | 28 | | |
| 871 | Gary Charlton | 1988-89 | Stand-off, Loose-forward | 3 | 0 | 0 | 0 | 0 | | |
| 1123 | Josh Charnley | 2010 | Centre | 5 | 5 | 0 | 0 | 20 | | Loaned from Wigan Warriors |
| 887 | Gary Chatfield | 1990-95 | Scrum-half | 72 | 11 | 19 | 7 | 89 | | |
| 1084 | Chris Chester | 2007-08 | Stand-off, Second-row, Loose-forward | 36 | 5 | 0 | 0 | 20 | | Later coached Hull KR |
| 1191 | Dane Chisholm | 2015 | Scrum-half, Stand-off | 7 | 3 | 0 | 0 | 12 | France | Loaned from Melbourne Storm |
| 901 | Dean Clark | 1991-94 | Scrum-half, Stand-off | 19 | 7 | 0 | 0 | 28 | New Zealand | |
| 820 | Garry Clark | 1982–91 | Wing | 259 | 121 | 4 | 0 | 475 | Great Britain | |
| 395 | Len Clark | | | 81+2 | 13 | 69 | 0 | 177 | | |
| 498 | Peter Clark | | | 11 | 2 | 0 | 0 | 6 | | Not the same as Peter Clarke |
| 215 | W. Clark | | | 165 | 69 | 6 | 0 | 219 | | |
| 1207 | Mitch Clark | 2017 | Prop, Second-row | 15 | 0 | 0 | 0 | 0 | | |
| 651 | Len Clark | | | 95 | 7 | 3 | 0 | 27 | | |
| 1193 | Chris Clarkson | 2016-18 | Centre, Hooker, Second-row, Loose-forward | 80 | 11 | 0 | 0 | 44 | | |
| 796 | Geoffrey Clarkson | 1978-80 | Second-row | 43+8 | 3 | 0 | 0 | 9 | | |
| 715 | Terry Clawson | 1968-71 | Prop, Second-row | 110+1 | 9 | 204 | 0 ^² | 435 | Great Britain | |
| 1119 | Joel Clinton | 2010-12 | Prop | 59 | 2 | 0 | 0 | 8 | Australia | |
| 869 | Chris Close | 1988-89 | Wing, Centre | 24 | 14 | 0 | 0 | 56 | Australia | |
| 1001 | Steve Cochrane | 2000-03 | Hooker | 17 | 2 | 0 | 0 | 8 | | |
| 1064 | Ben Cockayne | 2006–17 | Fullback, Wing | 231 | 78 | 21 | 0 | 354 | | |
| 378 | A. Codd | | | 5 | 0 | 0 | 0 | 0 | | |
| 320 | G. H. Coggles | | | 3 | 0 | 0 | 0 | 0 | | |
| 1110 | Liam Colbon | 2009-11 | Wing, Centre | 54 | 21 | 0 | 0 | 84 | | |
| 23 | Joseph Cole | | | 50 | 2 | 0 | 0 | 6 | | |
| 720 | Andrew Collins | | | 2+1 | 0 | 0 | 0 | 0 | | |
| 459 | F. Collinson | | | 4 | 2 | 0 | 0 | 6 | | |
| 80 | J. Connell | | | | | | | | | |
| 145 | Harry Conyers | | | 34 | 0 | 0 | 0 | 0 | | |
| 890 | Graham Cook | 1990-93 | Wing, Fullback | 27 | 3 | 0 | 0 | 12 | | |
| 140 | J. Cook | | | | | | | | | |
| 242 | Jim Cook | | | 365 | 117 | 3 | 0 | 357 | | |
| 1117 | Matt Cook | 2010-11 | Second-row, Loose-forward | 28 | 8 | 0 | 0 | 32 | England | |
| 1094 | Paul Cooke | 2007-10 | Stand-off, Loose-forward | 65 | 9 | 92 | 0 | 222 | England | |
| 1031 | Shaun Cooke | 2003 | Stand-off | 7 | 1 | 0 | 0 | 4 | | |
| 709 | Barrie Cooper | | | 13+1 | 0 | 2 | 0 | 4 | | |
| 669 | Colin Cooper | | | 136+14 | 41 | 3 | 0 | 129 | | |
| 267 | D. Cooper | | | 9 | 1 | 0 | 0 | 3 | | |
| 284 | H. Cooper | | | 2 | 0 | 0 | 0 | 0 | | |
| 1271 | Lachlan Coote | 2022-23 | Fullback | 27 | 11 | 58 | 1 | 161 | Great Britain; Scotland | |
| 114 | A. Cork | | | 4 | 0 | 1 | 0 | 2 | | |
| 533 | Bill Cornforth | | | 29 | 6 | 0 | 0 | 18 | | |
| 1159 | Neville Costigan | 2014 | Second-row, Loose-forward | 24 | 3 | 0 | 0 | 12 | Papua New Guinea | |
| 649 | Bill Coulman | | | 22 | 10 | 0 | 0 | 30 | | |
| 601 | Brian Coulson | | | 141 | 73 | 1 | 0 | 221 | | |
| 607 | Gordon Coulson | | | 33 | 1 | 0 | 0 | 3 | | |
| 257 | T. Coulson | | | 2 | 0 | 0 | 0 | 0 | | |
| 920 | Mick Coult | 1993-95 | Wing | 26 | 8 | 0 | 0 | 32 | | |
| 697 | Phil Coupland | 1965–77 | Centre | 214 | 69 | 26 | 0 | 259 | | |
| 1063 | Damien Couturier | 2005-06 | Centre | 28 | 9 | 86 | 0 | 208 | France | |
| 627 | Bob Coverdale | 1958-62 | Prop | 161 | 5 | 0 | 0 | 15 | Great Britain | |
| 716 | Bob Coverley | | | 9 | 0 | 0 | 0 | 0 | | |
| 1129 | Jordan Cox | 2011-15 | Prop, Second-row, Loose-forward | 78 | 12 | 0 | 0 | 48 | | |
| 19 | Charlie Coyne | 189?- | | 6 | 0 | 0 | 0 | 0 | | |
| 803 | Mick Crane | 1979-81 | Stand-off, Loose-forward | 15+3 | 4 | 0 | 0 | 12 | | |
| 895 | Mike Crane | 1991-01 | Fullback, Stand-off | 124 | 42 | 0 | 2 | 170 | | |
| 736 | Tony Crosby | | | 7 | 1 | 0 | 0 | 3 | | |
| 197 | Bruce Craven | | | 45 | 14 | 1 | 0 | 44 | | |
| 316 | A. Creer | | | 3 | 0 | 0 | 0 | 0 | | |
| 599 | Barry Croft | | | 10 | 0 | 0 | 0 | 0 | | |
| 1232 | Ben Crooks | 2018; 2019-22 | Centre | 80 | 37 | 15 | 0 | 178 | | |
| 795 | Steve Crooks | | Prop, Second-row | 96+15 | 3 | 0 | 0 | 9 | | |
| 1106 | Garret Crossman | 2008 | Prop | 29 | 1 | 1 | 0 | 6 | | |
| 138 | Albert Cudmore | | | 8 | 1 | 0 | 0 | 3 | | |
| 781 | John Cunningham | 1975-80 | Prop, Second-row, Loose-forward | 32+5 | 7 | 0 | 3 | 24 | England | |
| 456 | Maurice Daddy | | | 134 | 22 | 5 | 0 | 76 | | |
| 1226 | Will Dagger | 2018-23 | Fullback, Stand-off | 50 | 5 | 29 | 1 | 79 | | |
| 181 | R.W. Dakin | | | 14 | 2 | 0 | 0 | 6 | | |
| 325 | Harry Dale | 1926-38 | Scrum-half, Stand-off | 305 | 88 | 11 | 0 | 286 | | |
| 738 | Paul Daley | | | 49+10 | 7 | 1 | 0 | 23 | | |
| 539 | Bob Danby | | | 6 | 1 | 0 | 0 | 3 | | |
| 959 | Rob Danby | 1998-99 | Centre | 4 | 3 | 0 | 0 | 12 | | |
| 243 | Sid Danby | | | | | | | | | |
| 615 | J. Daniels | | | 1 | 1 | 0 | 0 | 3 | | |
| 934 | Andy Dannatt | 1995-99 | Prop | 95 | 2 | 0 | 0 | 8 | Great Britain | |
| 608 | Tom Danter | 1952-?? | Prop | 4 | 0 | 0 | 0 | 0 | Wales | |
| 937 | Rob D'arcy | 1995-97 | Centre | 54 | 31 | 0 | 0 | 124 | | |
| 1311 | Tom Davies | 2025-present | Wing | 51 | 32 | 0 | 0 | 112 | England | |
| 180 | R.C. Davison | | | 3 | 1 | 0 | 0 | 3 | | |
| 124 | J. Dawson | | | 9 | 1 | 0 | 0 | 3 | | |
| 747 | Neil Dawson | | | 52+8 | 0 | 29 | 0 | 58 | | |
| 205 | Idris Dean | | | 75 | 6 | 5 | 0 | 28 | | |
| 276 | T. Dean | 1920-?? | | | | | | | | |
| 929 | Andrew Dearlove | 1994-97 | Scrum-half, Stand-off, Hooker | 29 | 3 | 0 | 0 | 12 | | |
| 1328 | Frankie Dearlove | 2026-present | Second row | 1 | 0 | 0 | 0 | 0 | | |
| 1 | J. Debney | 1897-?? | | 76 | 6 | 0 | 0 | 18 | | |
| 385 | Gordon Deeley | | | 36 | 6 | 0 | 0 | 18 | | |
| 621 | Terry Devanney | | | 3 | 0 | 0 | 0 | 0 | | |
| 644 | Terry Dewsbury | | | 4 | 1 | 0 | 0 | 3 | | |
| 1325 | Jordan Dezaria | 2026-present | Prop | 4 | 0 | 0 | 0 | 0 | France | |
| 64 | A. Dickinson | | | 2 | 0 | 0 | 0 | 0 | | |
| 776 | Clive Dickinson | 1975- | Hooker | 34 | 2 | 0 | 0 | 6 | | |
| 141 | W.H. Dilcock | | | 117 | 61 | 0 | 0 | 183 | | |
| 809 | Colin Dixon | | Second-row, Loose-forward | 15+12 | 1 | 0 | 0 | 3 | | |
| 1175 | Kieran Dixon | 2015-16 | Fullback, Wing | 39 | 29 | 16 | 0 | 148 | | |
| 960 | Michael Dixon | 1998–2002 | Hooker | 146 | 39 | 0 | 0 | 156 | | |
| 292 | Henry Dixon | 1922–23 | | 3 | 0 | 0 | 0 | 0 | | |
| 1109 | Michael Dobson | 2008–13 | Scrum-half | 153 | 53 | 537 | 12 | 1298 | | |
| 831 | Steve Dobson | | | | | | | | | |
| 1215 | Zach Dockar-Clay | 2017 | Hooker, Stand-off, Scrum-half | 19 | 6 | 10 | 0 | 44 | | |
| 445 | Alec Dockar | 1937–53 | Loose-forward | 258 | 53 | 133 | 0 ^² | 425 | Great Britain | |
| 492 | A.C. Dodd | 1947–48 | | 1 | 0 | 0 | 0 | 0 | | |
| 1182 | James Donaldson | 2015-18 | Second-row, Loose-forward | 78 | 15 | 0 | 0 | 60 | | |
| 978 | Jason Donohue | 1999 | Scrum-half, Stand-off | | | | | | | |
| 718 | Carl Dooler | 1969 | Scrum-half | 18 | 1 | 3 | 0 | 9 | Great Britain | |
| 992 | Mark Dooley | 2000 | Stand-off, Wing | | | | | | | |
| 1013 | Dane Dorahy | 2002 | Scrum-half | 27 | 2 | 9 | 4 | 30 | | |
| 829 | John Dorahy | 1983-87 | Centre | 91 | 37 | 218 | 4 | 588 | Australia | |
| 1316 | Eribe Doro | 2025 | Prop | 9 | 0 | 0 | 0 | 0 | | Joined Bradford Bulls |
| 800 | Graham Douglas | | Second-row | 4+10 | 0 | 0 | 0 | 0 | | |
| 66 | J. Downing | | | 2 | 0 | 0 | 0 | 0 | | |
| 493 | Ken Downing | | | 13 | 5 | 0 | 0 | 15 | | |
| 732 | Ken Downing | | | | | | | | | |
| 654 | Joe Drake | 196? | | | | | | | | |
| 672 | Jim Drake | 1961-65 | Fullback, Second-row, Loose-forward | 78 | 7 | 0 | 0 | 21 | Great Britain | |
| 1235 | Josh Drinkwater | 2019 | Scrum-half, Stand-off | 32 | 7 | 6 | 0 | 40 | | |
| 743 | Geoff Druery | | | 9 | 1 | 0 | 0 | 3 | | |
| 16 | A. Duff | 1897-?? | | | | | | | | |
| 209 | James Duff | | | 19 | 2 | 1 | 0 | 8 | | |
| 981 | Allan Dunham | 2000-02 | Second-row, Hooker | 20 | 2 | 0 | 0 | 8 | | |
| 749 | Ged Dunn | 1971–82 | Wing | 296 | 160 | 0 | 0 | 480 | | |
| 297 | Dennis Dunn | 1922-23 | | 3 | 0 | 0 | 0 | 0 | | |
| 228 | C. Dutton | | | 8 | 1 | 0 | 0 | 3 | | |
| 1085 | Luke Dyer | 2007 | Wing, Centre | 27 | 12 | 0 | 0 | 48 | Wales | |
| 450 | J. Dyson | | | 3 | 0 | 0 | 0 | 0 | | |
| 247 | E. East | 1919-20 | | 1 | 0 | 0 | 0 | 0 | | |
| 386 | John "Mick" Eastwood | 1933–46 | | 208 | 65 | 0 | 0 | 195 | | |
| 940 | Paul Eastwood | 1995-96 | Wing | 26 | 14 | 13 | 0 | 82 | Great Britain | |
| 364 | W.H. Eddoms | | | 79 | 5 | 0 | 0 | 15 | | |
| 1150 | Greg Eden | 2013-14 | Fullback, Wing | 39 | 24 | 0 | 0 | 96 | | |
| 374 | Jas Edmond | | | 28 | 8 | 0 | 0 | 24 | | |
| 787 | Phil Edmonds | | Prop | 8+10 | 3 | 0 | 0 | 9 | | |
| 556 | B. Edwards | | | 3 | 0 | 0 | 0 | 0 | | |
| 494 | Billy Egan | | | 34 | 4 | 0 | 0 | 12 | | |
| 577 | George Ellenor | | | 32 | 4 | 13 | 0 | 38 | | |
| 564 | Harold Ellerby | | | 36 | 2 | 0 | 0 | 6 | | |
| 652 | David Ellerby | | | 1 | 0 | 0 | 0 | 0 | | |
| 136 | G. Ellerington | | | 1 | 0 | 0 | 0 | 0 | | |
| 603 | David Elliott | c. 1962–63 | | 291+9 | 60 | 0 | 0 | 180 | | |
| 1034 | Andy Ellis | 2003-06 | Hooker | 50 | 18 | 0 | 0 | 72 | | |
| 337 | H.O. Ellis | | | 4 | 0 | 0 | 0 | 0 | | |
| 1208 | Jamie Ellis | 2017; 2020 | Scrum-half | 38 | 12 | 178 | 1 | 405 | | |
| 44 | John G. Ellis | 1900–10 | Forward | 201 | 6 | 0 | 0 | 18 | | |
| 1299 | Lennie Ellis | 2023-present | Stand off | 1 | 0 | 0 | 0 | 0 | | |
| 827 | Asuquo Ema | 1983–92 | Prop | 233 | 18 | 0 | 0 | 72 | | |
| 1026 | Matt Emerson | 2003 | Prop | 1 | | | | | | |
| 1050 | Kane Epati | 2005 | Centre | 30 | 15 | 0 | 0 | 60 | Cook Islands | |
| 1072 | Ryan Esders | 2008-09 | Second-row, Loose-forward | 2 | 0 | 0 | 0 | 0 | | |
| 1171 | Sonny Esslemont | 2014-15 | Loose-forward | 6 | 0 | 0 | 0 | 0 | Scotland | |
| 1301 | Niall Evalds | 2024-present | Wing, Fullback | 16 | 8 | 0 | 0 | 32 | England | |
| 572 | Hagan Evans | | | 3 | 0 | 0 | 0 | 0 | | |
| 411 | J. Evans | | | 3 | 0 | 0 | 0 | 0 | | |
| 619 | Ray Evans | 1954-5? | Scrum-half | 39 | 9 | 0 | 0 | 27 | | |
| 561 | Sam Evans | | | 96 | 4 | 80 | 0 | 172 | | |
| 413 | T. Evans | | | 3 | 0 | 0 | 0 | 0 | | |
| 932 | Bob Everitt | 1994-97; 2001-02 | Fullback | 69 | 30 | 51 | 0 | 222 | | |
| 343 | R. Eyre | | | 1 | 0 | 0 | 0 | 0 | | |
| 72 | F. Fairburn | | | 2 | 1 | 0 | 0 | 3 | | |
| 818 | George Fairbairn | 1981–90 | Fullback | 269 | 51 | 554 | 19 | 1308 | Great Britain | |
| 1073 | John Fallon | 2006 | Prop | 5 | 0 | 0 | 0 | 0 | | |
| 431 | A.F. Farley | | | 5 | 0 | 2 | 0 | 4 | | |
| 632 | Keith Farnhill | | | 15 | 1 | 0 | 0 | 3 | | |
| 848 | Stuart Farr | 1985-86; 1994-95 | Scrum-half | 4 | 1 | 0 | 0 | 4 | | |
| 1012 | Craig Farrell | 2002-04 | Centre | 57 | 13 | 0 | 0 | 52 | | |
| 596 | Peter Faulkner | | | 2 | 0 | 0 | 0 | 0 | | |
| 2 | G. Fawcett | 1897–?? | | 6 | 1 | 2 | 0 | 7 | | |
| 289 | T. Fazackerley | 1921-?? | | | | | | | | |
| 285 | A. Feetham | 1921-?? | | | | | | | | |
| 327 | Jack Feetham | 1926-29 | | 84 | 24 | 0 | 0 | 72 | Great Britain | |
| 91 | William Feetham | | | 41 | 6 | 0 | 0 | 18 | | |
| 125 | Jesse Fenton | | | 11 | 2 | 0 | 0 | 6 | | |
| 516 | Arthur Ferguson | | | 14 | 3 | 0 | 0 | 9 | | He might be called Archie Ferguson? |
| 1149 | Dale Ferguson | 2013 | Second-row, Loose-forward | 4 | 1 | 0 | 0 | 4 | | Loaned from Huddersfield Giants |
| 193 | R.H. Ferney | | | 8 | 0 | 0 | 0 | 0 | | |
| 557 | H. Field | | | 1 | 1 | 0 | 0 | 3 | | |
| 451 | S. Fieldhouse | | | 1 | 0 | 0 | 0 | 0 | | |
| 570 | Joe Finan | | | 2 | 1 | 0 | 0 | 3 | | |
| 119 | G. Fish | | | 4 | 0 | 0 | 0 | 0 | | |
| 1065 | Ben Fisher | 2006–11 | Hooker | 165 | 33 | 0 | 0 | 132 | Scotland; Chile | |
| 604 | Gordon Fishwick | | | 21 | 2 | 32 | 0 | 70 | | |
| 1277 | Zach Fishwick | 2022-present | Prop | 7 | 1 | 0 | 0 | 4 | | |
| 766 | Allan Fitzgibbon | 1972-73 | Loose-forward, Stand-off | 20 | 3 | 0 | 0 | 9 | | |
| 1099 | Daniel Fitzhenry | 2008-09 | Fullback, Wing, Centre, Stand-off, Hooker | 20 | 3 | 0 | 0 | 9 | | |
| 658 | Peter Flanagan | 1960-75 | Hooker | 411+3 | 56 | 13 | 0 | 194 | Great Britain; England | |
| 704 | Stan Flannery | | | 3 | 2 | 0 | 2 | 8 | | |
| 3 | George Fletcher | 1897–? | | 147 | 23 | 0 | 0 | 69 | | |
| 839 | Mike Fletcher | 1985–98 | Centre, Stand-off | 360 | 56 | 1267 | 1 | 2759 | | |
| 867 | Paul Fletcher | 1988–05 | Prop, Second-row | 289 | 68 | 0 | 0 | 272 | | |
| 1056 | Byron Ford | 2005-07 | Wing | 67 | 58 | 0 | 0 | 232 | Cook Islands | |
| 541 | George Forth | | | 14 | 0 | 0 | 0 | 0 | | |
| 51 | J.W. Foss | 1899–1900 | | 2 | 0 | 0 | 0 | 0 | | |
| 693 | Frank Foster | 1964-69 | Loose-forward | 129+1 | 7 | 7 | 0 | 35 | Great Britain | |
| 303 | J. W. Foster | | | 2 | 0 | 0 | 0 | 0 | | |
| 706 | Leslie Foster | | | 29+4 | 3 | 1 | 0 | 11 | | |
| 424 | N. Foster | | | 19 | 4 | 0 | 0 | 12 | | |
| 79 | T. Foster | | | 15 | 2 | 0 | 0 | 6 | | |
| 281 | W. Fountain | 1921-22 | | 1 | 0 | 0 | 0 | 0 | | |
| 682 | Frank Fox | 1966-67 | Prop | 100+1 | 2 | 0 | 0 | 6 | | |
| 772 | Neil Fox | 1974-75 | Centre | 59 | 16 | 210 | 2 | 470 | Great Britain; England | |
| 678 | Peter Fox | 1962-63 | | 28 | 3 | 1 | 0 | 11 | | |
| 1100 | Peter Fox | 2008–11 | Wing | 105 | 56 | 0 | 0 | 224 | | |
| 1111 | Nick Fozzard | 2009 | Prop | 24 | 1 | 0 | 0 | 4 | Great Britain | |
| 588 | F. Freeman | | | 1 | 0 | 0 | 0 | 0 | | |
| 56 | G. Freeman | | | 1 | 0 | 0 | 0 | 0 | | |
| 371 | Robert Fridlington | | | 21 | 1 | 0 | 0 | 3 | | |
| 231 | L. Fussey | | | 60 | 13 | 0 | 0 | 39 | | |
| 137 | R.H. Galbraith | | | 3 | 0 | 0 | 0 | 0 | | |
| 356 | J. Gale | | | 2 | 0 | 0 | 0 | 0 | | |
| 1101 | Ben Galea | 2008–12 | Stand-off, Second-row, Loose-forward | 126 | 36 | 0 | 0 | 144 | | |
| 1042 | Tommy Gallagher | 2004-07 | Prop | 56 | 20 | 0 | 0 | 80 | | |
| 1088 | Jim Gannon | 2007 | Prop | 23 | 1 | 0 | 0 | 4 | | |
| 1238 | Mitch Garbutt | 2019-20 | Prop | 28 | 5 | 0 | 0 | 20 | | |
| 1166 | Ade Gardner | 2014 | Wing | 18 | 8 | 0 | 0 | 32 | Great Britain; England | Loaned from St Helens |
| 1057 | James Garmston | 2005-06 | Prop | 19 | 1 | 0 | 0 | 4 | | |
| 1275 | Tom Garratt | 2022 | Prop | 6 | 0 | 0 | 0 | 0 | | |
| 569 | Arthur Garry | | | 137 | 39 | 0 | 0 | 117 | | |
| 620 | George Garton | 195?-?? | | 11 | 1 | 0 | 0 | 3 | | |
| 198 | G. Garvin | | | 1 | 1 | 0 | 0 | 3 | | |
| 77 | Jim Gath | 1905-06 | | 115 | 17 | 2 | 0 | 55 | | |
| 701 | Roy Gay | | | 12+7 | 2 | 0 | 0 | 6 | | |
| 452 | Horace Gee | | | 22 | 8 | 0 | 0 | 24 | | |
| 1259 | Matty Gee | 2020 | Second-row | 13 | 0 | 0 | 0 | 0 | | |
| 4 | J. Geenty | 1897–?? | | 47 | 1 | 0 | 0 | 3 | | |
| 943 | Stanley Gene | 1996–99; 2007–09 | Stand-off, Scrum-half, Second-row, Loose-forward | 171 | 105 | 1 | 3 | 425 | | |
| 1154 | Luke George | 2013 | Wing, Centre | 5 | 4 | 0 | 0 | 16 | | Loaned from Huddersfield Giants |
| 218 | Peter Giblin | | | 1 | 0 | 0 | 0 | 0 | | |
| 211 | Frank Gibson | | | 123 | 8 | 24 | 0 | 72 | | |
| 391 | L. Gibson | 1934-35 | | 10 | 2 | 0 | 0 | 6 | | |
| 1302 | Oliver Gildart | 2024-present | Centre | 7 | 2 | 0 | 0 | 8 | Great Britain; England | |
| 38 | J.W. Gill | | | 2 | 0 | 0 | 0 | 0 | | |
| 666 | Norman Gillard | | | 17+3 | 5 | 0 | 0 | 15 | | |
| 219 | C. L. Gillie | | | 2 | 0 | 0 | 0 | 0 | | |
| 97 | T. Gillings | | | 2 | 0 | 0 | 0 | 0 | | |
| 237 | James Gilmore | | | 17 | 7 | 0 | 0 | 21 | | |
| 921 | John Glancy | 1993 | Prop | 8 | 0 | 0 | 0 | 0 | | |
| 122 | M. Gledhill | | | 2 | 0 | 0 | 0 | 0 | | |
| 1155 | Sean Gleeson | 2013-14 | Centre | 6 | 0 | 0 | 0 | 0 | Ireland | |
| 1066 | Jon Goddard | 2006-07 | Fullback, Centre | 43 | 18 | 0 | 0 | 72 | | |
| 1010 | Alex Godfrey | 2001-02 | Fullback, Wing | 35 | 19 | 0 | 1 | 77 | | |
| 1043 | Marvin Golden | 2004 | Wing, Centre | 2 | 0 | 0 | 0 | 0 | | |
| 584 | Bernard Golder | | | 39 | 11 | 0 | 0 | 33 | | |
| 499 | J. Golding | | | | | | | | | |
| 908 | Troy Goldman | 1992-93 | Stand-off | 5 | 2 | 0 | 0 | 8 | | |
| 458 | Bryn V. Goldswain | 1947-49 | Second-row | 122 | 19 | 9 | 0 | 75 | Wales | |
| 1082 | Lee Gomersal | 2006-08 | Wing | 3 | 0 | 0 | 0 | 0 | | |
| 24 | R.H. Goodin | | | 7 | 0 | 16 | 0 | 32 | | |
| 100 | Jimmy Gordon | c. 1905-06 | | 148 | 20 | 19 | 0 | 98 | | |
| 98 | Fred Gorman | | | 81 | 2 | 0 | 0 | 6 | | |
| 1294 | Louix Gorman | 2023 | Fullback, Centre | 1 | 0 | 0 | 0 | 0 | | |
| 897 | Andy Gotts | 1991-93 | Second-row | 3 | 0 | 0 | 0 | 0 | | |
| 946 | Alfie Goulbourne | 1996-97 | Wing | 24 | 15 | 0 | 0 | 60 | | |
| 490 | D. Goulding | | | 4 | 0 | 0 | 0 | 0 | | |
| 1176 | Darrell Goulding | 2015 | Centre | 8 | 1 | 0 | 0 | 4 | England | |
| 891 | James Goulding | 1990-91 | Prop, Second-row | 22 | 3 | 0 | 0 | 12 | New Zealand | |
| 585 | Keith Goulding | | | 21 | 3 | 12 | 0 | 33 | | |
| 101 | R. Goulding | | | 42 | 0 | 0 | 0 | 0 | | |
| 73 | C. Gowan | | | 2 | 0 | 0 | 0 | 0 | | |
| 397 | G.H. Gowan | | | | | | | | | |
| 331 | L. Gradwell | | | 1 | 0 | 0 | 0 | 0 | | |
| 524 | D. Grant | | | 7 | 1 | 0 | 0 | 3 | | |
| 45 | A. Grantham | | | 9 | 1 | 0 | 0 | 3 | | |
| 376 | E. Gray | | | 7 | 0 | 0 | 0 | 0 | | |
| 971 | Kevin Gray | 1999 | Fullback, Wing | | 1 | 3 | 0 | 10 | | |
| 409 | George Greaves | | | 8 | 0 | 0 | 0 | 0 | | |
| 59 | S. Greaves | | | 6 | 0 | 0 | 0 | 0 | | |
| 1124 | Blake Green | 2011-12 | Stand-off | 40 | 18 | 0 | 0 | 72 | | |
| 1143 | James Green | 2012-16 | Prop | 81 | 3 | 0 | 0 | 12 | | |
| 1187 | James Greenwood | 2015-19 | Centre, Prop, Second-row, Loose-forward | 92 | 22 | 0 | 0 | 88 | | |
| 549 | Ken Grice | | | 194 | 17 | 0 | 0 | 51 | | |
| 622 | Harry Griffett | | | 32 | 6 | 0 | 0 | 18 | | |
| 1142 | George Griffin | 2012-13 | Prop, Second-row, Loose-forward | 20 | 0 | 0 | 0 | 0 | | |
| 5 | Billy Guy | 1897–?? | half-back | 125 | 20 | 4 | 0 | 68 | | |
| 1158 | Josh Guzdek | 2013-15 | Fullback, Wing | 2 | 1 | 0 | 0 | 4 | | |
| 635 | Gordon Hackling | | | 28 | 1 | 0 | 0 | 3 | | |
| 388 | C. Hackling | 1933-34 | | 1 | 0 | 0 | 0 | 0 | | |
| 892 | Steve Hadi | 1990-91; 1993 | Wing | 19 | 3 | 0 | 0 | 12 | | |
| 1248 | Dean Hadley | 2020-present | Hooker, Second-row, Loose-forward | 83 | 7 | 0 | 0 | 28 | | |
| 919 | Nick Halafihi | 1993-94 | Prop, Second-row, Loose-forward | 24 | 4 | 0 | 0 | 16 | | |
| 915 | Carl Hall | 1992 | Wing, Centre | 3 | 2 | 0 | 0 | 8 | | |
| 1288 | Corey Hall | 2023-present | Centre, Second-row | 10 | 2 | 0 | 0 | 8 | | |
| 1125 | Craig Hall | 2011–14; 2018–19 | Fullback, Wing, Centre | 118 | 68 | 80 | 2 | 434 | | |
| 744 | David Hall | 1970-85 | Fullback, Centre, Stand-off, Loose-forward | 279+49 | 73 | 164 | 2 | 549 | Great Britain | |
| 580 | John Hall | 1954-58 | | 65 | 4 | 0 | 0 | 12 | | |
| 330 | J. Hall | 1927-28 | | 32 | 6 | 0 | 0 | 18 | | |
| 714 | Jim Hall | | | 11+2 | 0 | 0 | 0 | 0 | | |
| 998 | Mike Hall | 2000; 2002-03 | Fullback | 2 | 0 | 0 | 0 | 0 | | |
| 1266 | Ryan Hall | 2021-present | Wing | 90 | 56 | 0 | 0 | 216 | Great Britain; England | |
| 880 | Graeme Hallas | 1988-92 | Wing, Centre, Loose-forward | 67 | 15 | 34 | 4 | 132 | | |
| 1170 | Macauley Hallett | 2014 | Wing | 2 | 3 | 0 | 0 | 12 | | |
| 1274 | Frankie Halton | 2022-23 | Second-row, Loose-forward | 27 | 7 | 0 | 0 | 28 | Ireland | |
| 131 | G.J. Hambrecht | 1905-06 | | 77 | 5 | 0 | 0 | 15 | | |
| 417 | E. Hames | | | 1 | 0 | 0 | 0 | 0 | | |
| 587 | George Hamilton | | | 9 | 0 | 0 | 0 | 0 | | |
| 1326 | Ryan Hampshire | 2026-present | Fullback, scrum-half, stand-off | 1 | 0 | 0 | 0 | 0 | | |
| 597 | Norman Hancock | | | 54 | 8 | 0 | 0 | 24 | | |
| 576 | Ken Harbour | | | 30 | 1 | 0 | 0 | 3 | | |
| 1091 | Ian Hardman | 2007 | Fullback, Wing | 18 | 4 | 0 | 0 | 16 | | Loaned from St Helens |
| 911 | Craig Hardy | 1992-00 | Prop, Second-row | 48 | 1 | 0 | 0 | 4 | | |
| 798 | Paul Harkin | 1978-87 | Scrum-half | 168 | 24 | 0 | 38 | 125 | Great Britain | |
| 1051 | Neil Harmon | 2005 | Prop | 6 | 0 | 0 | 0 | 0 | Great Britain; Ireland | |
| 598 | Colin Harper | | | 19 | 0 | 4 | 0 | 8 | | |
| 270 | Louis Harris (MBE) | 1920–28 | Wing | 254 | 77 | 1 | 0 | 233 | | |
| 657 | Bob Harris | | | 128 | 77 | 0 | 0 | 231 | | |
| 1220 | Liam Harris | 2017 | Scrum-half, Stand-off | 1 | 0 | 0 | 0 | 0 | | |
| 426 | A. Harrison | | | 11 | 5 | 0 | 0 | 15 | | |
| 851 | Chris Harrison | 1985-86; 1991-96 | Prop, Second-row | 154 | 19 | 0 | 0 | 76 | | |
| 865 | Dave Harrison | 1987-88 | Hooker | 24 | 4 | 0 | 0 | 16 | | |
| 836 | Des Harrison | 1984-99 | Second-row | 229 | 26 | 0 | 0 | 104 | | |
| 1242 | Owen Harrison | 2019-21 | Prop | 14 | 0 | 0 | 0 | 0 | | Left to join Dewsbury Rams |
| 595 | Tom Harrison | | | 6 | 0 | 0 | 0 | 0 | | |
| 107 | Walter Harrison | | Scrum-half | 2 | 0 | 0 | 0 | 0 | | |
| 199 | Amos Hartley | | | 1 | 0 | 0 | 0 | 0 | | |
| 954 | Jez Hartley | 1997-98 | | 1 | 0 | 0 | 0 | 0 | | |
| 467 | Len Hartley | | | | | | | | | |
| 582 | Len Hartley | | | 52 | 2 | 0 | 0 | 6 | | |
| 741 | Steve Hartley | 1970-85 | Stand-off | 369 | 191 | 0 | 0 | 592 | Great Britain | |
| 1037 | Phil Hasty | 2004-05 | Scrum-half | 31 | 16 | 2 | 1 | 69 | | |
| 648 | Brian Hatch | | | 27 | 7 | 0 | 0 | 21 | | |
| 46 | A. Hatfield | | | | | | | | | |
| 1237 | Weller Hauraki | 2019-20 | Second-row, Loose-forward | 43 | 6 | 0 | 0 | 24 | | |
| 957 | Richard Hayes | 1997; 2001-02 | Prop | 60 | 4 | 0 | 0 | 16 | | |
| 1114 | James Haynes | 2009 | Wing | 1 | 0 | 0 | 0 | 0 | | |
| 1209 | Andrew Heffernan | 2017-18 | Centre | 31 | 20 | 0 | 0 | 80 | | |
| 1141 | Chris Heil | 2012-13 | Centre | 4 | 2 | 0 | 0 | 8 | | |
| 32 | B. Helliwell | | | 2 | 0 | 0 | 0 | 0 | | |
| 1035 | Craig Henry | 2003 | | 1 | 0 | 0 | 0 | 0 | | |
| 39 | E.W. Henson | | | 29 | 1 | 0 | 0 | 3 | | |
| 1157 | Tyla Hepi | 2013 | Prop, Second-row | 4 | 0 | 0 | 0 | 0 | | |
| 421 | J.E. Hepworth | | | 7 | 1 | 0 | 0 | 3 | | |
| 751 | Dave Heslop | | | 133+6 | 1 | 0 | 0 | 3 | | |
| 985 | Mark Hewitt | 2000 | Scrum-half | 1 | 0 | 2 | 0 | 4 | | |
| 755 | David Hick | | | 35+3 | 8 | 0 | 0 | 24 | | |
| 810 | Kevin Hickman | 1980 | Scrum-half | 2 | 0 | 0 | 0 | 0 | | |
| 206 | Robert Hicks | | | 60 | 19 | 0 | 0 | 57 | | |
| 690 | John Hickson | | | 68+14 | 5 | 0 | 0 | 15 | | |
| 1300 | Peta Hiku | 2024-present | Wing, Centre, Fullback | 17 | 12 | 1 | 0 | 50 | New Zealand | |
| 1092 | Danny Hill | 2006-07 | Second-row | 2 | 0 | 0 | 0 | 0 | | Loaned from Wigan Warriors |
| 961 | Howard Hill | 1998 | Second-row | 3 | 2 | 0 | 0 | 8 | | |
| 926 | Kenny Hill | 1994 | Hooker, Fullback | 7 | 1 | 0 | 0 | 4 | | |
| 341 | Roland Hill | | | 149 | 44 | 2 | 0 | 136 | | |
| 460 | Viv Hill | | | 50 | 1 | 1 | 0 | 5 | | |
| 405 | J. Hind | | | 12 | 0 | 2 | 0 | 4 | | |
| 624 | Ron Hobson | | | 7 | 0 | 0 | 0 | 0 | | |
| 1130 | David Hodgson | 2012-14; 2017 | Wing, Centre, Fullback | 50 | 25 | 0 | 0 | 100 | | |
| 210 | Eddie Hodgson | | | 27 | 7 | 0 | 0 | 21 | | |
| 158 | Fred Hodgson | | | 1 | 0 | 0 | 0 | 0 | | |
| 1120 | Josh Hodgson | 2010–14 | Hooker | 134 | 37 | 3 | 0 | 154 | | |
| 432 | R. Hodgson | | | 4 | 0 | 0 | 0 | 0 | | |
| 886 | Sean Hoe | 1990-97 | Hooker, Stand-off | 122 | 18 | 0 | 0 | 72 | | |
| 797 | Phil Hogan | 1978–88 | Centre, Second-row, Loose-forward | 254 | 65 | 53 | 1 | 316 | Great Britain; England | |
| 769 | Eric Holbrook | | | 1+1 | 0 | 0 | 0 | 0 | | |
| 667 | Alan Holdstock | | | 30 | 7 | 0 | 0 | 21 | | |
| 1038 | Dale Holdstock | 2004-05 | Second-row | 22 | 6 | 0 | 0 | 24 | | |
| 84 | H. Holdstock | 1901-02 | | 3 | 0 | 0 | 0 | 0 | | |
| 362 | H. Holdstock | 1931-32 | | 4 | 0 | 0 | 0 | 0 | | |
| 638 | Robert Holdstock | | | 5 | 0 | 0 | 0 | 0 | | |
| 760 | Roy Holdstock | 1973–85 | Prop | 277 | 23 | 0 | 1 | 71 | Great Britain | |
| 724 | Steve Holdstock | | | 10 | 0 | 0 | 0 | 0 | | |
| 1188 | Stephen Holker | 2015-16 | | 4 | 0 | 0 | 0 | 0 | | |
| 626 | Doug Holland | | | 58 | 9 | 0 | 0 | 27 | | |
| 692 | Bill Holliday | 1966-67 | Prop, Second-row | 143+2 | 18 | 140 | 0 ^² | 334 | Great Britain | |
| 142 | C. Holmes | | | 1 | 1 | 0 | 0 | 3 | | |
| 349 | F.B. Holmes | | | 6 | 0 | 1 | 0 | 2 | | |
| 573 | Jack Holt | | | 35 | 4 | 0 | 0 | 12 | | |
| 251 | H. Hood | | | 9 | 2 | 0 | 0 | 6 | | |
| 396 | J. Hornby | 1934-35 | | 1 | 0 | 0 | 0 | 0 | | |
| 1131 | Graeme Horne | 2012–17 | Centre, Second-row | 115 | 24 | 0 | 0 | 96 | | |
| 1320 | Harvey Horne | 2026-present | Fullback, wing, centre | 1 | 3 | 0 | 0 | 12 | | |
| 187 | W. Horner | | | 5 | 0 | 0 | 0 | 0 | | |
| 916 | David Hosking | 1993-94 | Prop | 16 | 1 | 0 | 0 | 4 | | |
| 721 | Dave Hossell | | | 20+14 | 0 | 0 | 0 | 0 | | |
| 57 | J. Hotham | | | 34 | 9 | 0 | 0 | 27 | | |
| 466 | D. Hough | | | 5 | 1 | 0 | 0 | 3 | | |
| 508 | C. Houghton | | | 5 | 1 | 0 | 0 | 3 | | |
| 290 | J. E. "Jack" Hoult | 1922-27 | Centre, Stand-off | 172 | 74 | 3 | 0 | 228 | | |
| 712 | Bob Howat | | | 5 | 0 | 13 | 0 | 26 | | |
| 1028 | Harvey Howard | 2003 | Prop | 12 | 2 | 0 | 0 | 8 | Great Britain; England | Head coach of Hull KR 2004-05 |
| 794 | Steve Hubbard | | | 118+4 | 72 | 327 | 0 | 870 | | |
| 212 | R. Hudson | | | 11 | 0 | 1 | 0 | 2 | | |
| 748 | Terry Hudson | 1971-75 | Scrum-half, Loose-forward | 99+7 | 20 | 13 | 0 | 86 | | |
| 972 | Ian Hughes | 1999 | Second-row | 29 | 5 | 0 | 0 | 20 | | |
| 778 | Mick Hughes | | | 73+30 | 10 | 0 | 0 | 30 | | |
| 167 | Richard Hughes | | | 146 | 32 | 5 | 0 | 106 | | |
| 175 | William Huskins | 1909–19 | Hooker | 222 | 17 | 0 | 0 | 51 | | |
| 449 | D. Hutchins | | | 29 | 7 | 0 | 0 | 21 | | |
| 433 | Bernard Hutchinson | | | 24 | 6 | 0 | 0 | 18 | | |
| 846 | Carl Hutchison | 1985 | Centre | | | | | | | |
| 950 | Darren Hutchinson | 1996-97 | Centre | 27 | 2 | 2 | 0 | 12 | | |
| 909 | Rob Hutchinson | 1992-93 | Centre, Second-row | 43 | 11 | 0 | 0 | 44 | | |
| 191 | W. Hyam | | | 45 | 13 | 0 | 0 | 39 | | |
| 1097 | Chaz I'Anson | 2007-10 | Wing, Stand-off, Loose-forward | 32 | 4 | 0 | 0 | 16 | | |
| 40 | A. Idle | | | 4 | 0 | 0 | 0 | 0 | | |
| 532 | Peter Ingram | | | 27 | 6 | 7 | 0 | 32 | | |
| 876 | Jimmy Irvine | 1988-90 | Centre, Stand-off | 45 | 13 | 0 | 0 | 52 | | |
| 387 | A. Jackson | 1933-34 | | 20 | 1 | 0 | 0 | 3 | | |
| 275 | J. Jackson | | | 2 | 0 | 0 | 0 | 0 | | |
| 739 | Rod Jackson | 1970 | Wing | 2 | 0 | 0 | 0 | 0 | | |
| 20 | R.W. Jackson | | | 25 | 13 | 0 | 0 | 39 | | |
| 491 | Bill Jackson | | | 23 | 5 | 0 | 0 | 15 | | |
| 893 | Wayne Jackson | 1990-93 | Prop | 60 | 1 | 0 | 0 | 4 | | |
| 633 | Ray Jacques | | | 62 | 10 | 0 | 0 | 30 | | |
| 640 | Jim Jenkins | | | 42 | 1 | 0 | 0 | 3 | | |
| 6 | J. Jennison | 1897–?? | | 2 | 0 | 0 | 0 | 0 | | |
| 351 | H. Jessop | | | 5 | 1 | 0 | 0 | 3 | | |
| 1218 | Lee Jewitt | 2017-19 | Prop | 24 | 1 | 0 | 0 | 4 | | |
| 986 | Leroy Joe | 2000 | Stand-off | 1 | 0 | 0 | 0 | 0 | Cook Islands | |
| 590 | Dennis Johnson | | | 20 | 0 | 0 | 0 | 0 | | |
| 178 | George Johnson | 1909–10 | | 1 | 0 | 0 | 0 | 0 | | |
| 317 | G. Johnson | 1925-26 | | 3 | 1 | 0 | 0 | 3 | | |
| 463 | G. Johnson | 1945 | | 4 | 0 | 0 | 0 | 0 | | |
| 52 | J. Johnson | | | 7 | 0 | 0 | 0 | 0 | | |
| 1214 | Josh Johnson | 2017-19 | Prop | 19 | 0 | 0 | 0 | 0 | | |
| 1244 | Luis Johnson | 2019; 2021-23 | Second-row | 33 | 2 | 0 | 0 | 8 | | |
| 1144 | Nick Johnson | 2012 | Wing, Centre | 1 | 0 | 0 | 0 | 0 | | |
| 58 | R. Johnson | | | 30 | 2 | 5 | 0 | 16 | | |
| 150 | R. Johnson | | | | | | | | | |
| 841 | Lindsay Johnson | | | | | | | | | |
| 179 | Kennedy Johnston | | | | | | | | | |
| 842 | Peter Johnston | 1985-86 | Prop, Second-row | 20 | 1 | 0 | 0 | 4 | | |
| 780 | Geoff Jones | | | 5+10 | 0 | 0 | 0 | 0 | | |
| 873 | Mark Jones | 1988-89 | Scrum-half, Stand-off | 8 | 2 | 0 | 0 | 8 | | |
| 188 | Reginald Jones | | | | | | | | | Probably not the same person who played for Oldham; dates don’t match up |
| 195 | S. Jones | | | | | | | | | |
| 288 | T. Jones | 1921-22 | | 2 | 0 | 0 | 0 | 0 | | |
| 157 | Windsor Jones | | | 11 | 1 | 0 | 0 | 3 | | |
| 342 | William Gwyn Jones | | | | | | | | | |
| 328 | A. J. Jordan | | | 22 | 8 | 0 | 0 | 24 | | |
| 401 | Wilfred Jordan | | | 6 | 1 | 0 | 0 | 3 | | |
| 1070 | Phil Joseph | 2006 | Prop, Hooker, Second-row, Loose-forward | 19 | 0 | 0 | 0 | 0 | Wales | |
| 126 | William Frederick Jowett | c. 1905-06 | Wing | 43 | 22 | 1 | 0 | 68 | | |
| 1203 | Will Jubb | 2016-17 | Hooker | 7 | 1 | 0 | 0 | 4 | | |
| 1213 | Ben Kavanagh | 2017-18 | Prop, Second-row, Loose-forward | 54 | 3 | 0 | 0 | 12 | Scotland | |
| 379 | J. Keable | | | 1 | 0 | 0 | 0 | 0 | | |
| 1160 | Kris Keating | 2014 | Scrum-half | 24 | 5 | 0 | 0 | 20 | | |
| 631 | John Keegan | | | 14 | 0 | 0 | 0 | 0 | | |
| 264 | Bob Keegan | | | 16 | 1 | 0 | 0 | 3 | | |
| 489 | George Keen | | | 15 | 0 | 0 | 0 | 0 | | |
| 1234 | Jimmy Keinhorst | 2019-23 | Centre, Second-row | 72 | 15 | 0 | 0 | 60 | Germany | |
| 605 | Cyril Kellett | 1956-68 | Fullback | 382 | 35 | 1192 | 0 ^² | 2489 | | |
| 1177 | Albert Kelly | 2015-16 | Scrum-half, Stand-off | 43 | 23 | 3 | 0 | 98 | | |
| 821 | Andy Kelly | 1983-88 | Prop, Second-row | 167 | 29 | 0 | 0 | 116 | England | |
| 808 | Pat Kelly | | | 0+1 | 0 | 0 | 0 | 0 | | |
| 7 | Albert Kemp | 1897–?? | Forward | 178 | 24 | 25 | 0 | 122 | | |
| 725 | Dave Kemp | | | 1 | 0 | 0 | 0 | 0 | | |
| 689 | George Kennedy | | | 4 | 0 | 0 | 0 | 0 | | |
| 965 | Jamie Kennedy | 1998 | | 3 | 0 | 0 | 0 | 0 | | |
| 995 | Phil Kennedy | 2000 | | | | | | | Ireland | |
| 1284 | Rhys Kennedy | 2023 | Prop | 26 | 1 | 0 | 0 | 4 | | |
| 1253 | Shaun Kenny-Dowall | 2020-23 | Wing, Centre | 93 | 25 | 0 | 0 | 100 | New Zealand | |
| 1315 | Lee Kershaw | 2025-present | Wing | 1 | 1 | 0 | 0 | 4 | | |
| 563 | Peter Key | | | 114 | 16 | 4 | 0 | 56 | | |
| 1258 | Joe Keyes | 2020-21 | Scrum-half, Stand-off | 6 | 1 | 6 | 0 | 16 | Ireland | |
| 928 | Paddy Khan | 1994 | Prop | 8 | 1 | 0 | 0 | 4 | | |
| 687 | Alan Kilby | | | 1 | 0 | 0 | 0 | 0 | | Is this the same Alan Kilby who was a wrestler? |
| 1265 | George King | 2020-present | Prop, Loose-forward | 93 | 4 | 0 | 0 | 16 | Ireland | |
| 655 | Ken Kingsbury | | | 31 | 1 | 21 | 0 | 45 | | |
| 528 | Harry Kirby | | | 34 | 21 | 1 | 0 | 65 | | |
| 273 | J. Kirby | | | 1 | 0 | 0 | 0 | 0 | | |
| 759 | Terry Kirchin | | | 5+1 | 0 | 0 | 0 | 0 | | |
| 86 | G. Kirk | | | 4 | 0 | 0 | 0 | 0 | | |
| 659 | Malcolm Kirk | | Loose-forward | 4 | 0 | 0 | 0 | 0 | | |
| 990 | Ian Kirke | 2000 | Prop, Second-row | 18 | 1 | 0 | 0 | 4 | | |
| 306 | J. Kirkham | | | 1 | 0 | 0 | 0 | 0 | | |
| 746 | George Kirkpatrick | | | 105+15 | 36 | 0 | 0 | 108 | | |
| 955 | Chris Kitching | 1997-01 | Centre, Stand-off, Fullback, Wing | 28 | 6 | 3 | 1 | 31 | | |
| 263 | H. Kitson | | | 9 | 0 | 0 | 0 | 0 | | |
| 567 | Ernie Knapp | | | 29 | 6 | 0 | 0 | 18 | | |
| 473 | Herbert Knight | | | 17 | 3 | 0 | 0 | 9 | | |
| 553 | Bryn Knowelden | 1952-55 | Wing, Centre, Stand-off | 66 | 10 | 0 | 0 | 30 | Great Britain; England | |
| 53 | Henry Kruger | | | 22 | 0 | 0 | 0 | 0 | | |
| 1140 | James Laithwaite | 2012 | Second-row | 3 | 1 | 0 | 0 | 4 | | Loaned from Warrington Wolves |
| 538 | J. Lamping | | | 1 | 0 | 0 | 0 | 0 | | |
| 1161 | Jamie Langley | 2014 | Second-row, Loose-forward | 11 | 1 | 0 | 0 | 4 | Great Britain; England | |
| 1239 | Ryan Lannon | 2019 | Second-row, Loose-forward | 8 | 1 | 0 | 0 | 4 | | |
| 1162 | Kevin Larroyer | 2014-16 | Second-row, Loose-forward | 51 | 10 | 0 | 0 | 40 | France | |
| 653 | Cliff Last | | | 30 | 2 | 1 | 0 | 8 | | |
| 1122 | Sam Latus | 2010-13 | Wing, Centre | 38 | 14 | 0 | 0 | 46 | | |
| 1276 | Phoenix Laulu-Togagaꞌe | 2022-present | Fullback, Wing | 9 | 0 | 0 | 0 | 0 | | |
| 527 | J. Lavin | | | 21 | 2 | 0 | 0 | 6 | | |
| 1192 | George Lawler | 2015-21 | Hooker, Second-row, Loose-forward | 95 | 11 | 0 | 0 | 44 | | |
| 859 | Kenny Lawler | 1987-89 | Second-row | 7 | 0 | 0 | 0 | 0 | | |
| 812 | David Laws | Wing | Wing, Stand-off | 189 | 75 | 0 | 0 | 289 | Great Britain | |
| 21 | J. Lawton | | | 8 | 8 | 0 | 0 | 24 | | |
| 1321 | Karl Lawton | 2026-present | Hooker, second-row, loose-forward | 13 | 3 | 0 | 0 | 12 | | |
| 825 | Tracy Lazenby | 1983-85 | Loose-forward, Stand-off | 12+1 | 4 | 0 | 0 | 12 | | |
| 996 | Jim Leatham | 2000 | Prop, Second-row | | | | | | | |
| 1224 | Tommy Lee | 2018-19 | Scrum-half, Stand-off, Hooker | 37 | 3 | 0 | 0 | 12 | | |
| 517 | G. Leftley | | | 10 | 0 | 0 | 0 | 0 | | |
| 903 | Jamie Leighton | 1991-97 | Loose-forward, Second-row | 51 | 6 | 0 | 0 | 24 | | |
| 752 | Steve Leighton | | | 95+14 | 11 | 0 | 0 | 33 | | |
| 1093 | Mark Lennon | 2007 | Fullback, Wing | 15 | 5 | 7 | 0 | 34 | Wales | |
| 25 | J. Levett | | | | | | | | | |
| 382 | A. Lewis | | | 13 | 1 | 0 | 0 | 3 | | |
| 81 | C. Lewis | | | 24 | 3 | 1 | 0 | 11 | | |
| 204 | Daniel Lewis | | | 50 | 8 | 0 | 0 | 24 | | |
| 521 | Harry Lewis | | | 55 | 3 | 48 | 0 | 105 | | |
| 512 | John Lewis | | | 31 | 0 | 61 | 0 | 122 | | |
| 1250 | Mikey Lewis | 2019-present | Stand-off, Scrum-half, Fullback | 85 | 39 | 52 | 0 | 168 | England | |
| 462 | Wyndham Lewis | | | 2 | 0 | 0 | 0 | 0 | | |
| 1317 | Bill Leyland | 2025-present | Hooker | 19 | 2 | 0 | 0 | 8 | | |
| 910 | David Liddiard | 1992-93 | Fullback, Wing, Centre | 29 | 11 | 0 | 0 | 44 | | |
| 884 | David Lightfoot | 1989-91 | Fullback | 28 | 6 | 0 | 0 | 24 | | |
| 17 | J. Lindsay | 1898- | | 4 | 1 | 0 | 0 | 3 | | |
| 735 | John Lines | | | 3 | 0 | 0 | 0 | 0 | | |
| 1236 | Kane Linnett | 2019-23 | Centre, Second-row | 110 | 39 | 0 | 0 | 116 | Scotland | |
| 1249 | Jez Litten | 2019; 2020-present | Hooker, Scrum-half | 108 | 10 | 5 | 0 | 50 | England | |
| 1245 | Harvey Livett | 2019; 2020 | Second-row, Centre | 15 | 3 | 0 | 0 | 12 | | Both stints on loan from Warrington Wolves |
| 674 | Alan Lockwood | | | 31 | 1 | 1 | 0 | 5 | | |
| 793 | Brian Lockwood | 1978-80 | Prop, Loose-forward | 74+1 | 11 | 0 | 0 | 33 | Great Britain | |
| 111 | A. Lofthouse | | | 84 | 11 | 1 | 0 | 35 | | |
| 315 | S. Lofthouse | | | 6 | 6 | 0 | 0 | 18 | | |
| 710 | Paul Longstaff | | | 121+6 | 41 | 0 | 0 | 123 | | |
| 216 | Harold "Buff" Lord (Tennant) | | Centre | 64 | 39 | 0 | 0 | 117 | | |
| 1096 | Rhys Lovegrove | 2007–14 | Prop, Second-row, Loose-forward | 160 | 18 | 0 | 0 | 72 | | |
| 912 | Andrew Lowe | 1992-93 | Prop | 1 | 0 | 0 | 0 | 0 | | |
| 232 | James Lowe | | | 36 | 2 | 0 | 0 | 6 | | |
| 703 | Phil Lowe | 1967-83 | Second-row | 378+32 | 179 | 0 | 0 ^² | 537 | Great Britain; England | |
| 1286 | Sam Luckley | 2023-present | Prop, Second-row, Loose-forward | 44 | 4 | 0 | 0 | 16 | Scotland | |
| 973 | David Luckwell | 1999-02 | Prop | 45 | 2 | 0 | 0 | 8 | Wales | |
| 670 | Bob Luffman | | | 6 | 2 | 0 | 0 | 6 | | |
| 500 | Jim Lufford | | | 15 | 2 | 7 | 0 | 20 | | |
| 931 | Tim Lumb | 1994-95 | Scrum-half | 11 | 3 | 1 | 2 | 16 | | |
| 1185 | Shaun Lunt | 2015-19 | Hooker | 92 | 35 | 0 | 0 | 140 | England | |
| 817 | John Lydiat | 1980-91 | Fullback, Centre | 176 | 45 | 49 | 0 | 275 | | |
| 258 | W. Lynch | | | 9 | 0 | 1 | 0 | 2 | | |
| 786 | Terry Lynn | | | 4 | 1 | 0 | 0 | 3 | | |
| 877 | Paul Lyman | 1988-93 | Second-row, Loose-forward | 94 | 39 | 0 | 0 | 156 | | |
| 311 | Norman Lyons | | | 20 | 3 | 0 | 0 | 9 | | |
| 775 | Steve Lyons | 1974- | Prop | 53+3 | 6 | 0 | 0 | 18 | | |
| 525 | Len Madden | 195?- | | 4 | 0 | 0 | 0 | 0 | | |
| 765 | Ian Madley | | | 44+22 | 4 | 0 | 0 | 12 | | |
| 82 | W. Madley | | | 123 | 24 | 34 | 0 | 140 | | |
| 628 | Joe Mageen | | | 13 | 6 | 0 | 0 | 18 | | |
| 1256 | Will Maher | 2020-22 | Prop | 42 | 0 | 0 | 0 | 0 | | |
| 650 | Terry Major | | | 266+8 | 52 | 3 | 0 | 162 | | |
| 176 | Alf Mann | 1909–18 | Forward | 224 | 50 | 0 | 0 | 150 | Great Britain; England | |
| 1033 | Paul Mansson | 2003-05 | Stand-off | 51 | 25 | 0 | 3 | 103 | | |
| 1179 | Josh Mantellato | 2015-16 | Wing | 44 | 33 | 172 | 0 | 492 | | |
| 1243 | Antoni Maria | 2019 | Prop, Second-row | 6 | 0 | 0 | 0 | 0 | France | Loaned from Catalans Dragons |
| 1061 | Misili Manu | 2005 | Wing | 2 | 0 | 0 | 0 | 0 | | |
| 832 | Billy Marchant | | | | | | | | | |
| 711 | Ian Markham | | | 132+5 | 16 | 0 | 0 | 48 | | |
| 1113 | Frankie Mariano | 2009-10 | Prop, Second-row, Loose-forward | 4 | 0 | 0 | 0 | 0 | Scotland | |
| 675 | Tony Marks | | | 1 | 0 | 0 | 0 | 0 | | |
| 112 | F. Marrow | | | 6 | 1 | 0 | 0 | 3 | | |
| 352 | John Marrow | | | 2 | 0 | 0 | 0 | 0 | | |
| 933 | Lee Marsden | 1994 | Second-row | | 0 | 0 | 0 | 0 | | |
| 589 | Tom Marsden | | | | 0 | 0 | 0 | 0 | | |
| 1190 | Matthew Marsh | 2015-18 | Fullback, Stand-off, Scrum-half | 42 | 9 | 0 | 0 | 36 | | |
| 221 | David Marshall | | | 12 | 2 | 0 | 0 | 6 | | |
| 165 | W. Marshall | | | 3 | 0 | 0 | 0 | 0 | | |
| 189 | W. Mart | | | 1 | 0 | 0 | 0 | 0 | | |
| 1314 | Rhyse Martin | 2025-present | Second-row, Loose forward, Centre | 31 | 10 | 116 | 0 | 252 | Papua New Guinea | |
| 453 | R. Martindale | | | 7 | 0 | 0 | 0 | 0 | | |
| 1075 | Sébastien Martins | 2006 | Prop, Second-row | 4 | 1 | 0 | 0 | 4 | France | |
| 418 | Raymond Maskill | 1936-46 | Prop, Second-row | 115 | 8 | 0 | 0 | 24 | | |
| 1222 | Mose Masoe | 2017-19 | Prop | 59 | 6 | 0 | 0 | 24 | Samoa | |
| 1126 | Willie Mason | 2011 | Prop, Second-row | 6 | 1 | 0 | 0 | 4 | Australia; Tonga | |
| 611 | Alan Matthews | | | 26 | 2 | 0 | 0 | 6 | | |
| 660 | Brian Matthews | | | 2 | 1 | 0 | 0 | 3 | | |
| 389 | E.G. Matthews | | | 5 | 0 | 0 | 0 | 0 | | |
| 298 | H. Matthews | | | 5 | 0 | 0 | 0 | 0 | | |
| 860 | Lee Matthews | 1987-88 | | 2 | 0 | 0 | 0 | 0 | | |
| 729 | Bob Maxwell | | | 0+3 | 0 | 0 | 0 | 0 | | |
| 1303 | Tyrone May | 2024-present | Centre, Scrum-half, Stand-off | 17 | 3 | 0 | 0 | 12 | Samoa | |
| 1039 | Casey Mayberry | 2004 | Fullback, Wing | 1 | 0 | 0 | 0 | 0 | | |
| 550 | Jock McAvoy | | | 50 | 9 | 4 | 0 | 35 | | |
| 478 | Fred McBain | | | 69 | 18 | 0 | 0 | 54 | | |
| 900 | Troy McCarthy | 1991-92 | Centre, Fullback | 13 | 4 | 0 | 0 | 16 | | |
| 1178 | Tyrone McCarthy | 2015 | Second-row, Loose-forward | 31 | 6 | 0 | 0 | 24 | Ireland | |
| 1006 | Alasdair McClarron | 2001-05 | Wing | 78 | 50 | 0 | 0 | 200 | | |
| 366 | Ernest McCloud | | | 8 | 1 | 0 | 0 | 3 | | |
| 85 | W. McConnell | | | 3 | 0 | 0 | 0 | 0 | | |
| 966 | John McCracken | 1998 | Fullback | 2 | 0 | 0 | 0 | 0 | | |
| 1132 | Shannon McDonnell | 2012 | Fullback | 22 | 6 | 0 | 0 | 24 | Ireland | |
| 1223 | Danny McGuire | 2018-19 | Stand-off | 45 | 9 | 1 | 4 | 42 | Great Britain; England | |
| 799 | Gary McHugh | 1980-82 | Wing | 39+1 | 7 | 0 | 0 | 21 | | |
| 8 | P. McDermott | | | 1 | 0 | 0 | 0 | 0 | | |
| 192 | C. McDonald | | | 106 | 20 | 0 | 0 | 60 | | |
| 220 | Tommy McGiever | | | 159 | 26 | 0 | 0 | 78 | | |
| 239 | Joe McGlone | | | 24 | 3 | 0 | 0 | 9 | | |
| 403 | Tom McGowan | | | 66 | 13 | 0 | 0 | 39 | | |
| 1312 | Michael McIlorum | 2025 | Hooker | 16 | 0 | 0 | 0 | 0 | England; Ireland | |
| 293 | Jack McIntyre | 1922-?? | | 303 | 38 | 1 | 0 | 116 | | |
| 907 | Craig McKeough | 1992 | Centre | 11 | 4 | 0 | 0 | 16 | | |
| 105 | A. McNamara | | | 1 | 0 | 0 | 0 | 0 | | |
| 683 | Edward McNamara | | | 14+1 | 1 | 0 | 0 | 3 | | |
| 427 | James McNulty | | | 12 | 2 | 0 | 0 | 6 | | |
| 425 | Ernie McWatt | | | 9 | 0 | 0 | 0 | 0 | | |
| 367 | Wilfred McWatt | | | 323 | 28 | 429 | 0 | 942 | | |
| 707 | Andrew Mead | | | 1+1 | 0 | 0 | 0 | 0 | | Unlikely to be Australian Andrew Meads |
| 661 | Peter Medcalf | | | 3 | 0 | 0 | 0 | 0 | | |
| 468 | H. Megson | | | 1 | 1 | 0 | 0 | 3 | | |
| 680 | Brian Mennell | | | 106+5 | 5 | 0 | 0 | 15 | | |
| 1107 | Luke Menzies | 2008 | Prop | 2 | 0 | 0 | 0 | 0 | | Became pro-wrestler Ridge Holland |
| 54 | E.H. Merritt | | | 4 | 1 | 0 | 0 | 3 | | |
| 511 | E. Metcalfe | | | 3 | 0 | 0 | 0 | 0 | | |
| 398 | F. Middleton | | | 43 | 4 | 0 | 0 | 12 | | |
| 1133 | Constantine Mika | 2012-13 | Second-row, Loose-forward | 52 | 10 | 0 | 0 | 40 | Samoa | |
| 835 | Bruce Miller | 1984 | Wing | 8 | 6 | 0 | 0 | 24 | | |
| 834 | Gavin Miller | 1984-87 | Centre, Second-row, Loose-forward | 79 | 24 | 0 | 0 | 96 | Australia | |
| 737 | John Millington | 1970–85 | Prop | 418 | 32 | 0 | 0 | 97 | | |
| 1102 | David Mills | 2008-09 | Prop | 36 | 2 | 0 | 0 | 8 | Wales | |
| 479 | Henry Mills | | | 153 | 35 | 0 | 0 | 105 | | |
| 442 | Ron Mills | | | 131 | 17 | 13 | 0 | 77 | | |
| 700 | Roger Millward (MBE) | 1966-80 | Wing, Stand-off, Scrum-half | 399+7 | 207 | 597 | 10 | 1825 | Great Britain | |
| 33 | H. Milner | | | 3 | 0 | 0 | 0 | 0 | | |
| 438 | J. C. Milner | | | 25 | 11 | 22 | 0 | 77 | | |
| 1264 | Rowan Milnes | 2020-23 | Scrum-half, Stand-off | 49 | 7 | 41 | 0 | 110 | | |
| 1216 | George Milton | 2017 | Loose-forward | | | | | | | |
| 1257 | Elliot Minchella | 2020-present | Hooker, Second-row, Loose-forward | 89 | 14 | 0 | 0 | 56 | | |
| 1252 | Greg Minikin | 2020-21 | Wing, Centre | 25 | 10 | 0 | 0 | 40 | | |
| 1194 | Thomas Minns | 2016-18; 2019 | Fullback, Wing, Centre | 49 | 34 | 0 | 0 | 136 | | |
| 300 | W. Mitton | | | 9 | 0 | 0 | 0 | 0 | | |
| 636 | Rowley Moat | | | 59 | 18 | 0 | 0 | 54 | | |
| 980 | Gavin Molloy | 1999-01 | Fullback, Wing | 10 | 2 | 0 | 0 | 8 | | |
| 170 | Arthur Moore | 1913-20? | Forward | 342 | 90 | 1 | 0 | 272 | England | |
| 1280 | Connor Moore | 2022-23 | Prop | 3 | 0 | 0 | 0 | 0 | | |
| 529 | Frank Moore | | | 132 | 22 | 0 | 0 | 66 | | |
| 274 | J. Moore | | | 2 | 1 | 0 | 0 | 3 | | |
| 554 | John Ernest Moore | | | 2 | 0 | 0 | 0 | 0 | | |
| 172 | J. G. Moore | | | 7 | 0 | 0 | 0 | 0 | | |
| 681 | John Robert Moore | | | 394+36 | 105 | 0 | 0 | 315 | | |
| 764 | Pete Moore | | | 0+1 | 0 | 0 | 0 | 0 | | |
| 375 | J. W. Moores | | | 72 | 15 | 2 | 0 | 49 | | |
| 722 | Asher Moran | | | 1 | 0 | 0 | 0 | 0 | | |
| 1198 | Kieran Moran | 2016-17 | Prop | 7 | 0 | 0 | 0 | 0 | Scotland | |
| 277 | H. Moran | 1921-22 | | 2 | 0 | 0 | 0 | 0 | | |
| 9 | Samuel Morfitt | c. 1889–91 c. 1895–98 | Wing, Centre | 104 | 55 | 26 | 0 | 217 | | |
| 422 | Stephen Morgan | | | 90 | 15 | 0 | 0 | 45 | | |
| 1067 | Iain Morrison | 2006-07 | Prop, Second-row | 39 | 5 | 0 | 0 | 20 | Scotland | |
| 629 | Albert Mortimer | | | 19 | 4 | 0 | 0 | 12 | | |
| 861 | Peter Mortimer | 1987-88 | Wing | 22 | 5 | 0 | 0 | 20 | | |
| 1060 | Gareth Morton | 2005-07 | Centre, Second-row | 51 | 23 | 210 | 0 | 512 | Scotland | |
| 361 | A. Moss | | | 2 | 1 | 0 | 0 | 3 | | |
| 1210 | Kieren Moss | 2017-18 | Fullback, Wing, Stand-off | 24 | 17 | 0 | 0 | 68 | | |
| 307 | T. Moss | | | 7 | 1 | 0 | 0 | 3 | | |
| 1318 | Arthur Mourgue | 2025-present | Fullback, scrum-half, stand-off | 28 | 11 | 79 | 0 | 198 | France | |
| 435 | R. Moxon | | | 6 | 0 | 0 | 0 | 0 | | |
| 1196 | Robbie Mulhern | 2016-20 | Prop, Loose-forward | 90 | 7 | 0 | 0 | 28 | England; Ireland | |
| 121 | D. Mullineaux | c. 1905-06 | | 56 | 2 | 0 | 0 | 6 | | |
| 643 | Arthur Mullins | | | 109+2 | 16 | 8 | 0 | 64 | | |
| 254 | Harold Mulvey | | | 50 | 17 | 0 | 0 | 51 | | |
| 1009 | Craig Murdock | 2001-03 | Scrum-half | 35 | 13 | 0 | 0 | 52 | | |
| 1329 | Declan Murphy | 2026-present | Fullback | 1 | 0 | 0 | 0 | 0 | | |
| 664 | Peter Murphy | 1959-66 | Loose-forward, Prop, Second-row | 34+2 | 2 | 0 | 0 | 6 | | |
| 547 | S. Murphy | | | 1 | 0 | 0 | 0 | 0 | | |
| 74 | D. Murray | | | 6 | 0 | 0 | 0 | 0 | | |
| 1246 | Daniel Murray | 2019-20 | Prop | 28 | 0 | 0 | 0 | 0 | | |
| 248 | Frank Murray | | | 14 | 1 | 0 | 0 | 3 | | |
| 1068 | Scott Murrell | 2006–12 | Stand-off, Scrum-half, Loose-forward | 177 | 42 | 36 | 4 | 244 | | |
| 813 | Peter Muscroft | 1980-82 | Wing | 58+2 | 18 | 0 | 0 | 54 | | |
| 1269 | Muizz Mustapha | 2021 | Prop | 11 | 0 | 0 | 0 | 0 | | Loaned from Leeds Rhinos |
| 436 | J. Naylor | | | 34 | 9 | 0 | 0 | 27 | | |
| 148 | W. Neal | | | 1 | 0 | 0 | 0 | 0 | | |
| 155 | J. Neal | | | 6 | 5 | 0 | 0 | 15 | | |
| 750 | Jim Neale | | | 35+3 | 1 | 0 | 0 | 3 | | |
| 858 | Tony Needler | 1986-87 | | | | | | | | |
| 185 | Thomas Neil | | | 5 | 0 | 0 | 0 | 0 | | |
| 160 | J. Nelson | | | 1 | 0 | 0 | 0 | 0 | | |
| 447 | Walter Ness | | | 24 | 5 | 2 | 0 | 19 | | |
| 1045 | Jason Netherton | 2004–14 | Prop, Second-row, Loose-forward | 194 | 13 | 0 | 0 | 52 | | |
| 1079 | Kirk Netherton | 2007-09 | Hooker, Second-row | 24 | 3 | 0 | 0 | 12 | | |
| 1103 | Clint Newton | 2008–11 | Centre, Prop, Second-row | 100 | 40 | 0 | 0 | 160 | | |
| 464 | Syd Nichol | | | | | | | | | |
| 883 | Bryan Niebling | 1989-91 | Prop, Second-row | 26 | 2 | 0 | 0 | 8 | Australia | |
| 31 | J. Noble | | | 15 | 0 | 0 | 0 | 0 | | |
| 853 | Rob Noble | 1985 | Fullback, Wing, Centre | 2 | 0 | 0 | 0 | 0 | | |
| 266 | E. T. Nolan | | | 6 | 1 | 0 | 0 | 3 | | |
| 987 | Rob Nolan | 2000 | Centre | 1 | 0 | 0 | 0 | 0 | | |
| 730 | Ray Norrie | | | 1+3 | 0 | 0 | 0 | 0 | | |
| 768 | Steven Nuttall | | Hooker | 15+1 | 0 | 0 | 0 | 0 | | |
| 1199 | Will Oakes | 2016-20 | Wing | 24 | 10 | 0 | 0 | 40 | Scotland | |
| 505 | Len Oates | | | 36 | 0 | 0 | 0 | 0 | | |
| 872 | Craig O'Brien | 1988-94 | Prop, Second-row | 68 | 8 | 0 | 0 | 32 | | |
| 942 | Richard O'Brien | 1995-97 | Second-row | 31 | 11 | 0 | 0 | 44 | | |
| 526 | Hugh O'Connor | | | 20 | 1 | 0 | 0 | 3 | | |
| 358 | J. O'Connor | | | 1 | 0 | 0 | 0 | 0 | | |
| 801 | Jeff O'Dell | | Centre | 3+2 | 0 | 0 | 0 | 0 | | |
| 1139 | Ryan O'Hara | 2012-14 | Prop | 15 | 1 | 0 | 0 | 4 | | |
| 944 | John Okul | 1996-98 | Wing, Centre, Fullback | | | | | | | |
| 583 | Pat O'Leary | 1953 | | 28 | 0 | 8 | 0 | 16 | | |
| 225 | Fred Oliver | | | 46 | 4 | 1 | 0 | 14 | | |
| 434 | Joe Oliver | 1938-40 | Fullback, Centre | 34 | 4 | 36 | 0 | 84 | | |
| 956 | Paul Oliver | 1997 | | 1 | 2 | 0 | 0 | 8 | | |
| 918 | Richard Oliver | 1993-96 | Wing | 14 | 12 | 0 | 0 | 48 | | |
| 1156 | Aaron Ollett | 2013-15 | Second-row, Loose-forward | 26 | 1 | 0 | 0 | 4 | | |
| 849 | Steve Olsen | 1985-86 | Second-row | 3 | 0 | 0 | 0 | 0 | | |
| 1089 | Mark O'Neill | 2007 | Second-row, Loose-forward | 17 | 5 | 0 | 0 | 20 | | |
| 1282 | Tom Opacic | 2023-present | Centre | 42 | 11 | 0 | 0 | 44 | | |
| 472 | David Orr | | | 1 | 0 | 0 | 0 | 0 | | |
| 269 | Laurence Osborne | 1925- | Fullback | 432 | 22 | 713 | 0 ^² | 1492 | England | |
| 116 | W.T. Osborne | c. 1905-06 | | 67 | 2 | 0 | 0 | 6 | | |
| 1046 | Paul Owen | 2004 | Fullback | 10 | 1 | 0 | 0 | 4 | | |
| 1134 | Mickey Paea | 2012-13 | Prop | 54 | 6 | 0 | 0 | 24 | Tonga | |
| 497 | Alf Palframan Jr. | | | 161 | 7 | 0 | 0 | 21 | | |
| 227 | Alf Palframan Sr. | | | 14 | 1 | 0 | 0 | 3 | | |
| 677 | Eric Palmer | | | 78+19 | 18 | 0 | 0 | 54 | | |
| 1327 | Tevita Pangai Junior | 2026-present | Prop, second-row, loose-forward | 1 | 0 | 0 | 0 | 0 | | |
| 1247 | Matt Parcell | 2019; 2020-present | Hooker | 108 | 31 | 0 | 0 | 124 | | |
| 469 | A. Park | | | 2 | 0 | 0 | 0 | 0 | | |
| 816 | Frank Parker | 1980-85 | Wing | 0+2 | 0 | 0 | 0 | 0 | | |
| 286 | J. Parker | | | 54 | 4 | 1 | 0 | 14 | | |
| 578 | Johnny Parker | | | | | | | | | Is this Australian Johnny Parker? |
| 676 | Keith Parker | | | 1 | 0 | 0 | 0 | 0 | | |
| 1021 | Paul Parker | 2003-06 | Centre, Stand-off | 47 | 22 | 0 | 0 | 88 | | |
| 852 | Wayne Parker | 1986–99 | Scrum-half | 245 | 62 | 0 | 33 | 281 | | |
| 253 | R. Parkes | | | 1 | 0 | 0 | 0 | 0 | | |
| 347 | Jonty Parkin | 1930-3? | Scrum-half, Stand-off | 57 | 11 | 28 | 0 | 89 | Great Britain; England | |
| 143 | V. Parr | | | 1 | 1 | 0 | 0 | 3 | | |
| 1146 | Cory Paterson | 2013 | Second-row | 7 | 0 | 0 | 28 | | | |
| 182 | H. Pattison | | | 1 | 0 | 0 | 0 | 0 | | |
| 637 | Graham Paul | | Wing | 197 | 116 | 1 | 0 | 350 | | |
| 509 | Arthur Payne | | | 36 | 3 | 0 | 0 | 9 | | |
| 1204 | Jamie Peacock | 2016 | Prop, Second-row | 4 | 0 | 0 | 0 | 0 | Great Britain; England | |
| 252 | Samuel Peak | 1919-20 | | 4 | 0 | 0 | 0 | 0 | | |
| 423 | W. Perrott | | | 41 | 6 | 0 | 0 | 18 | | |
| 1138 | Dave Petersen | 2012 | Loose-forward | 4 | 1 | 0 | 0 | 4 | | |
| 1262 | Nathaniel Peteru | 2020 | Prop, Second-row | 10 | 0 | 0 | 0 | 0 | | |
| 67 | H. Pexton | | | 14 | 0 | 0 | 0 | 0 | | |
| 419 | J. Phillips | | | 4 | 0 | 0 | 0 | 0 | | |
| 65 | Billy Phipps | c. 1905-06 | | 171 | 30 | 2 | 0 | 94 | | |
| 92 | James Pickering | | | 54 | 1 | 0 | 0 | 3 | | |
| 1022 | Paul Pickering | 2003-05 | Hooker | 43 | 8 | 0 | 0 | 32 | | |
| 606 | Kenneth Pickersgill | | | 4 | 0 | 0 | 0 | 0 | | |
| 762 | Brian Pinkney | | | 11+7 | 4 | 0 | 0 | 12 | | |
| 1018 | Nick Pinkney | 2002-04 | Wing | 62 | 30 | 0 | 0 | 120 | England | |
| 924 | David Plange | 1994-96 | Wing | 54 | 63 | 0 | 0 | 252 | Great Britain | |
| 691 | Keith Pollard | 1967 | Prop, Hooker | 20+2 | 1 | 0 | 0 | 3 | | |
| 662 | Harry Poole | 1961-66 | Second-row, Loose-forward | 123 | 27 | 0 | 0 | 81 | Great Britain | |
| 1163 | Justin Poore | 2014 | Prop | 7 | 0 | 0 | 0 | 0 | | |
| 68 | J.W. Porter | | | 9 | 1 | 0 | 0 | 3 | | |
| 870 | Michael Porter | 1988-89 | Prop, Hooker | 29 | 5 | 0 | 0 | 20 | | |
| 1023 | Craig Poucher | 2003-05 | Fullback | 34 | 10 | 33 | 0 | 106 | | |
| 437 | J. Pounder | | | 3 | 0 | 0 | 0 | 0 | | |
| 1062 | Olivier Pramil | 2005 | | 1 | 0 | 0 | 0 | 0 | France | |
| 222 | C. H. Pratt | | | 4 | 0 | 0 | 0 | 0 | | |
| 120 | George Pratt | | | 55 | 12 | 4 | 0 | 44 | | |
| 874 | Richard Pratt | 1988-89 | Wing | 28 | 5 | 0 | 0 | 20 | | |
| 233 | Jack Prescott | 1913-15 | Centre, Stand-off, Scrum-half | 39 | 10 | 0 | 0 | 30 | | |
| 1074 | Gareth Price | 2006 | Prop | 12 | 1 | 0 | 0 | 4 | Wales | |
| 805 | Raymond Price | | Hooker | 46+13 | 1 | 0 | 2 | 5 | | |
| 308 | Sydney Pryce | | | 6 | 1 | 0 | 0 | 3 | | |
| 173 | H. Prissick | | | 1 | 0 | 0 | 0 | 0 | | |
| 811 | Paul Proctor | 1980-83 | Fullback, Wing, Centre | 27+20 | 6 | 0 | 0 | 18 | | |
| 822 | Gary Prohm | 1982-86 | Wing, Centre, Loose-forward | 147 | 104 | 0 | 0 | 399 | New Zealand | |
| 1189 | Tony Puletua | 2015 | Prop | 13 | 1 | 0 | 0 | 4 | New Zealand; Samoa | Loaned from Salford Red Devils |
| 1211 | Adam Quinlan | 2017-21 | Fullback | 65 | 30 | 0 | 0 | 120 | | |
| 402 | Fred Riach | | | 21 | 0 | 0 | 0 | 0 | | |
| 1014 | Adrian Rainey | 2002 | Prop, Second-row | 1 | 0 | 0 | 0 | 0 | | |
| 318 | C. "Tacker" Rainton | | | 44 | 5 | 8 | 0 | 31 | | |
| 1052 | Andy Raleigh | 2005-06 | Second-row | 29 | 17 | 0 | 0 | 68 | | |
| 408 | Albert E. Ramsden | | | 11 | 0 | 0 | 0 | 0 | | This isn’t Albert Ramsden who also played for Hunslet & Bradford; as he would be too old |
| 393 | Joe Ramsden | | | 348 | 7 | 0 | 0 | 21 | | |
| 770 | Terry Ramshaw | 1974-75 | Prop, Second-row | 16+2 | 0 | 0 | 0 | 0 | | |
| 685 | Danny Raper | | | 3 | 2 | 1 | 0 | 8 | | |
| 214 | H. Raper | | | 1 | 0 | 0 | 0 | 0 | | |
| 1118 | Michael Ratu | 2010 | Centre | 5 | 1 | 0 | 0 | 4 | Fiji | |
| 1261 | Nick Rawsthorne | 2020 | Wing, Centre | 6 | 1 | 0 | 0 | 4 | | |
| 312 | J. Raynor | | | 48 | 10 | 0 | 0 | 30 | | |
| 200 | Eli Raywood | | | 1 | 0 | 0 | 0 | 0 | | |
| 108 | D. Read | | | | | | | | | |
| 95 | J.W. Read | | | 112 | 24 | 0 | 0 | 72 | | |
| 106 | Stephen Read | | | | | | | | | |
| 123 | J. Reaston | | | 2 | 0 | 0 | 0 | 0 | | |
| 359 | Gerard Redmond | | | 2 | 1 | 0 | 0 | 3 | | |
| 129 | Dan Rees | c. 1905-06 | | 54 | 11 | 5 | 0 | 43 | | |
| 282 | Rhys Rees | 1921-?? | | 82 | 17 | 1 | 0 | 53 | | Is this the same Rhys Rees who Wales, Merthyr Tydfil RLFC & Wigan? |
| 1307 | Ben Reynolds | 2024-present | Scrum-half, Stand-off | 2 | 0 | 0 | 0 | 0 | | |
| 47 | A. Rhodes | | | 1 | 0 | 0 | 0 | 0 | | |
| 10 | Jack Rhodes | 1897-?? | | 84 | 8 | 0 | 0 | 24 | | |
| 313 | Ralph Rhodes | | | 6 | 3 | 2 | 0 | 13 | | |
| 346 | Walter Ribbett | | | 3 | 0 | 0 | 0 | 0 | | |
| 461 | Emlyn Richards | | | 109 | 47 | 0 | 0 | 141 | | |
| 1273 | Greg Richards | 2022-23 | Prop | 15 | 0 | 0 | 0 | 0 | | |
| 430 | Gwyn Richards | | Stand-off | | | | | | | |
| 147 | Alfred Richardson | | | 19 | 3 | 0 | 0 | 9 | | |
| 1310 | Danny Richardson | 2024-25 | Scrum-half, Stand-off | 4 | 0 | 12 | 0 | 24 | | Loaned from Castleford Tigers |
| 162 | F. Richardson | | | 7 | 0 | 4 | 0 | 8 | | |
| 866 | Lee Richardson | 1994-95 | Hooker | 11 | 0 | 0 | 0 | 0 | | |
| 905 | Steve Richardson | 1992-94 | Centre, Second-row | 15 | 1 | 0 | 0 | 4 | | |
| 174 | T. Edward Richardson | | | 20 | 3 | 0 | 0 | 9 | | |
| 48 | F. Richmond | | | 2 | 0 | 0 | 0 | 0 | | |
| 625 | Bill Riley | | | 107 | 24 | 0 | 0 | 72 | | |
| 11 | Thomas Ripton | 1897-?? | Fullback, Centre | 15 | 6 | 0 | 0 | 18 | | |
| 1059 | Leroy Rivett | 2005-06 | Wing | 44 | 16 | 0 | 0 | 64 | | |
| 515 | C. Roberts | | | 1 | 0 | 1 | 0 | 2 | | |
| 326 | Fred Roberts | | | 20 | 0 | 0 | 0 | 0 | | |
| 43 | Arthur Robinson | | Centre | 48 | 7 | 6 | 0 | 33 | | |
| 1169 | Connor Robinson | 2014-15 | Scrum-half | 2 | 0 | 0 | 0 | 0 | | |
| 784 | Ian Robinson | 1975–86 | Fullback, Centre | 219 | 50 | 40 | 0 | 215 | | |
| 574 | N. Robinson | | | 7 | 0 | 0 | 0 | 0 | | |
| 879 | Steve Robinson | 1989-91 | Scrum-half | 21 | 5 | 0 | 0 | 20 | | |
| 322 | W. Robley | | | 1 | 2 | 0 | 0 | 6 | | |
| 914 | Steve Robson | 199? | Loose-forward | | | | | | | |
| 634 | John Rogers | | | 26 | 1 | 1 | 0 | 5 | | |
| 1240 | Adam Rooks | 2019-20 | Second-row, Loose-forward | 7 | 0 | 0 | 0 | 0 | | |
| 728 | Max Rooms | | | 57+9 | 17 | 0 | 0 | 51 | | |
| 723 | Paul Rose | 1969–81 | Second-row | 270 | 43 | 0 | 0 | 129 | Great Britain | |
| 1295 | César Rougé | 2023 | Scrum-half, Hooker, Stand-off | 1 | 0 | 0 | 0 | 0 | | Loaned from Catalans Dragons |
| 947 | Paul Rouse | 1996-99 | Wing | 32 | 22 | 0 | 0 | 88 | | |
| 646 | Ron Rowbottom | | | 17 | 0 | 0 | 0 | 0 | | |
| 1278 | Sam Royle | 2022 | Second-row | 3 | 2 | 0 | 0 | 8 | | Loaned from St Helens |
| 824 | Chris Rudd | 1982-90 | Hooker | 155 | 26 | 0 | 0 | 103 | | |
| 26 | S. Ruddeforth | | | 15 | 3 | 0 | 0 | 9 | | |
| 551 | Dennis Rushton | | | 68 | 9 | 0 | 0 | 27 | | |
| 939 | Nicky Rushton | 1995 | Prop, Second-row | 1 | 0 | 0 | 0 | 0 | | |
| 49 | T. Rushworth | | | 6 | 1 | 0 | 0 | 3 | | |
| 555 | J. Russell | | | 1 | 0 | 0 | 0 | 0 | | |
| 1260 | Ethan Ryan | 2020-23 | Fullback, Wing, Centre | 42 | 23 | 0 | 0 | 92 | Ireland | |
| 864 | Glenn Ryan | 1987 | Second-row | 19 | 2 | 0 | 0 | 8 | | |
| 319 | George E. Saddington | 1934-?? | Second-row | 171 | 34 | 12 | 0 | 126 | England | |
| 963 | Paul Sagar | 1998 | | | | | | | | |
| 925 | Tim Sage | 1994-95 | Prop | 6 | 0 | 0 | 0 | 0 | | |
| 301 | J. Sadler | | | 1 | 0 | 0 | 0 | 0 | | |
| 354 | J. Salter | | | 1 | 0 | 0 | 0 | 0 | | |
| 1137 | Liam Salter | 2012–18 | Centre | 121 | 22 | 0 | 0 | 88 | | |
| 476 | Len Sanders | | | 4 | 0 | 0 | 0 | 0 | | |
| 815 | John Sanderson | 1980-81 | Scrum-half | 8 | 4 | 0 | 1 | 13 | | |
| 392 | John Sanderson | | | 8 | 2 | 0 | 0 | 6 | | |
| 168 | William Sandham | 1909-12 | Forward | 183 | 87 | 0 | 0 | 261 | Wales | |
| 50 | E.M. Sapcote | | | 1 | 0 | 0 | 0 | 0 | | |
| 321 | G. Saul | | | 30 | 8 | 0 | 0 | 24 | | |
| 334 | A. Scarborough | | | 26 | 4 | 0 | 0 | 12 | | |
| 1293 | Brad Schneider | 2023 | Scrum-half, Stand-off | 12 | 3 | 40 | 2 | 94 | | |
| 429 | Ben Schofield | | | 15 | 5 | 0 | 0 | 15 | | |
| 495 | J. Schofield | | | 29 | 9 | 0 | 0 | 27 | | |
| 485 | Dennis Scholes | 1947-51; 1957-58 | Fullback, Second-row | 129 | 25 | 0 | 0 | 75 | | |
| 1007 | Matt Schultz | 2001-02 | Second-row | 38 | 3 | 0 | 0 | 12 | | |
| 875 | Stuart Schultz | 1988-90 | Scrum-half, Centre | 3 | 0 | 0 | 0 | 0 | | |
| 733 | Jim Scott | | | 1+2 | 0 | 0 | 0 | 0 | | |
| 930 | Paul Scott | 1994-97 | Prop | 26 | 3 | 0 | 0 | 12 | | |
| 18 | W. Scruton | 189?-?? | | 1 | 0 | 0 | 0 | 0 | | |
| 1212 | Nick Scruton | 2017-19 | Prop | 49 | 6 | 0 | 0 | 24 | | |
| 34 | F. Sedgewick | | | 5 | 0 | 0 | 0 | 0 | | |
| 164 | J. Sedgewick | | | 9 | 3 | 0 | 0 | 9 | | |
| 1029 | Anthony Seibold | 2003-04 | Prop | 40 | 6 | 0 | 0 | 24 | | |
| 481 | Arthur Senior | | | 59 | 0 | 0 | 0 | 0 | | |
| 1287 | Louis Senior | 2023-present | Wing | 18 | 8 | 0 | 0 | 32 | Ireland | |
| 474 | W. Sharkett | | | | | | | | | |
| 335 | Leslie Sharpe | | | 182 | 13 | 0 | 0 | 39 | | |
| 593 | Brian Shaw | 1965-?? | Prop, Second-row, Loose-forward | 79 | 34 | 0 | 0 | 102 | Great Britain | |
| 1296 | Isaac Shaw | 2023 | Prop | 1 | 0 | 0 | 0 | 0 | | Loaned from Wakefield Trinity |
| 698 | Joby Shaw | 1966-?? | Hooker | 11 | 0 | 0 | 0 | 0 | Great Britain | |
| 1197 | Ryan Shaw | 2016-19 | Wing, Centre, Fullback | 82 | 46 | 138 | 0 | 460 | | |
| 565 | Stan Shaw | | | 5 | 0 | 6 | 0 | 12 | | |
| 41 | W. Shaw | | | 4 | 0 | 0 | 0 | 0 | | |
| 134 | J. Sheard | | | 4 | 0 | 0 | 0 | 0 | | |
| 88 | A. Shepherd | | | 2 | 0 | 0 | 0 | 0 | | |
| 1127 | Louis Sheriff | 2011-12 | Fullback | 9 | 4 | 0 | 0 | 16 | | |
| 130 | H. Sherwood | c. 1905-06 | | 43 | 1 | 0 | 0 | 3 | | |
| 135 | Sam Sherwood | | | 21 | 3 | 1 | 0 | 11 | | |
| 217 | W. Shiel | | | 22 | 3 | 0 | 0 | 9 | | |
| 244 | Fred W. Shillito | | | 126 | 11 | 0 | 0 | 33 | | |
| 373 | Fred Shillito | | | | | | | | | |
| 400 | T.H. Shipp | | | 9 | 0 | 0 | 0 | 0 | | |
| 579 | Jim Shires | | | 42 | 4 | 1 | 0 | 14 | | |
| 614 | Gordon Shoebottom | | | 7 | 2 | 0 | 0 | 6 | | |
| 962 | Lee Sibary | 1998 | Fullback | 2 | 0 | 0 | 0 | 0 | | |
| 613 | D. Simpkin | | | 2 | 0 | 0 | 0 | 0 | | |
| 410 | L. Simpson | | | 2 | 0 | 0 | 0 | 0 | | |
| 830 | Mark Simpson | | | | | | | | | |
| 368 | R.E. Simpson | | | 3 | 0 | 3 | 0 | 9 | | |
| 616 | Brian Sims | | | 22 | 3 | 0 | 0 | 9 | | |
| 838 | Gary Sims | | | | | | | | | |
| 642 | J. Sims | | | 4 | 0 | 0 | 0 | 0 | | |
| 1267 | Korbin Sims | 2021-22 | Prop, Loose-forward, Second-row | 32 | 1 | 0 | 0 | 4 | Fiji | |
| 75 | W. Sims | | | 23 | 1 | 0 | 0 | 3 | | |
| 27 | Herbert Sinclair | c. 1905-06 | | 147 | 3 | 6 | 0 | 21 | | |
| 1180 | Ken Sio | 2015-16 | Fullback, Wing, Centre | 61 | 36 | 13 | 0 | 170 | | |
| 850 | Tony Sissons | 1985-86 | Hooker | 3 | 0 | 0 | 0 | 0 | | |
| 988 | Richard Slater | 2000-01 | Loose-forward | 28 | 2 | 0 | 0 | 8 | | |
| 104 | E. Sleep | | | 10 | 1 | 0 | 0 | 3 | | |
| 83 | J. Small | | | 4 | 0 | 0 | 0 | 0 | | |
| 719 | Peter Small | 1970-71? | Wing, Second-row | 43 | 3 | 0 | 0 | 9 | Great Britain | |
| 952 | Terry Smirk | 1997 | Scrum-half, Hooker | 5 | 0 | 1 | 0 | 2 | | |
| 586 | A. Smith | | | 2 | 0 | 0 | 0 | 0 | | |
| 1229 | Aaron Smith | 2018 | Hooker | 4 | 0 | 0 | 0 | 0 | | Loaned from St Helens |
| 964 | Andy Smith | 1998–04 | Second-row, Loose-forward | 174 | 18 | 1 | 0 | 74 | | |
| 486 | Cyril Smith | 1947-?? | | 62 | 17 | 0 | 0 | 51 | | |
| 823 | Gordon Smith | 1982-88 | Scrum-half, Stand-off | 177 | 25 | 1 | 5 | 102 | New Zealand | |
| 30 | H. W. Smith | 1899-?? | | 93 | 8 | 5 | 0 | 34 | | |
| 360 | Jack Smith | | | 60 | 15 | 0 | 0 | 45 | | |
| 213 | James A. Smith | | | 4 | 0 | 6 | 0 | 12 | | |
| 779 | Mike Smith | 1974-91 | Centre, Stand-off, Loose-forward | 489 | 140 | 2 | 3 | 493 | Great Britain; England | |
| 1058 | Michael Smith | 2005-07 | Second-row, Loose-forward | 3 | 1 | 0 | 0 | 4 | New Zealand | |
| 968 | Richard Smith | 1999 | Fullback | 1 | 0 | 0 | 0 | 0 | Ireland | |
| 519 | Sam Smith | 1949-54 | Hooker | 116 | 0 | 0 | 0 | 0 | Great Britain; England | |
| 843 | Steve Smith | 1985-89 | Wing | 32 | 12 | 0 | 0 | 48 | | |
| 78 | T. Smith | | | 24 | 0 | 29 | 0 | 58 | | |
| 757 | Robert Smithies | 1972-76 | Fullback | 54+1 | 22 | 0 | 0 | 66 | | |
| 483 | A. Snitch | | | 2 | 1 | 0 | 0 | 3 | | |
| 889 | Bright Sodje | 1990-94; 2001 | Wing | 93 | 39 | 0 | 0 | 156 | | |
| 117 | Arthur Spackman | 1904–12 | Forward | 222 | 13 | 0 | 0 | 39 | | |
| 484 | Bernard Spamer | | | 25 | 3 | 9 | 0 | 27 | | |
| 324 | J. T. "Jack" Spamer | | | 440 | 142 | 23 | 0 | 472 | | |
| 12 | J. Spavieri | | | 3 | 9 | 0 | 0 | 18 | | |
| 1121 | Scott Spaven | 2010 | Hooker | 2 | 0 | 0 | 0 | 0 | | |
| 837 | Paul Speckman | | Loose-forward | | | | | | | |
| 612 | Ray Speckman | | | 1 | 0 | 0 | 0 | 0 | | |
| 530 | Brian Spence | | | 30 | 6 | 9 | 0 | 36 | | |
| 207 | W. Spiller | | | 5 | 2 | 0 | 0 | 6 | | |
| 194 | George Spivey | | | 29 | 12 | 0 | 0 | 36 | | |
| 758 | Michael Spivey | | | 0+2 | 0 | 0 | 0 | 0 | | |
| 415 | John Standage | | | 9 | 2 | 0 | 0 | 6 | | |
| 609 | Sid Stark | | | 33 | 16 | 0 | 0 | 48 | | |
| 13 | Anthony Starks | 1898–1907 | Forward | 223 | 34 | 72 | 0 ^² | 246 | | |
| 62 | F. Starks | | | 2 | 0 | 0 | 0 | 0 | | |
| 845 | Ray Stead | 1985-88 | Wing | 63 | 13 | 0 | 0 | 52 | | |
| 1053 | Jon Steel | 2005-08 | Wing | 42 | 25 | 0 | 0 | 100 | Scotland | |
| 454 | C.A. Steele | | | 65 | 29 | 0 | 0 | 87 | | |
| 1019 | Chris Stephenson | 2002-03 | Fullback, Stand-off | 5 | 1 | 15 | 0 | 34 | | |
| 1069 | Francis Stephenson | 2004-06 | Prop | 17 | 1 | 0 | 0 | 4 | | |
| 14 | J. Stephenson | 1897-?? | | 120 | 5 | 2 | 0 | 19 | | |
| 696 | Mike Stephenson | 1965–74 | Wing, Stand-off, Scrum-half | 238 | 102 | 0 | 1 | 307 | | |
| 935 | Sam Stewart | 1995-97 | Second-row | 20 | 1 | 0 | 0 | 4 | New Zealand | |
| 668 | Terry Stocks | | | 11 | 8 | 0 | 0 | 24 | | |
| 113 | B. Stokell | | | 1 | 0 | 0 | 0 | 0 | | |
| 407 | J. Stoker | | | 5 | 2 | 0 | 0 | 6 | | |
| 548 | J. Storr | | | 16 | 0 | 0 | 0 | 0 | | |
| 1255 | Matthew Storton | 2020-24 | Prop, Second-row | 91 | 9 | 0 | 0 | 36 | | |
| 283 | Roland Stothard | | | 1 | 0 | 0 | 0 | 0 | | |
| 523 | Ron Stothard | 195?-?? | | 3 | 0 | 0 | 0 | 0 | | |
| 1011 | Lynton Stott | 2002-04 | Fullback, Centre | 73 | 26 | 136 | 5 | 381 | | |
| 1283 | Sauaso Sue | 2023-present | Prop, Second-row | 31 | 3 | 0 | 0 | 12 | Samoa | |
| 1017 | Adam Sullivan | 2002-04 | Second-row | 26 | 2 | 0 | 0 | 8 | | |
| 863 | Anthony Sullivan | 1988-91 | Wing | 11 | 28 | 0 | 0 | 112 | Great Britain; Wales | |
| 773 | Clive Sullivan (MBE) | 1974–80 | Wing | 213 | 118 | 0 | 0 | 354 | Great Britain; Wales | |
| 177 | Thomas Surman | 1909-13 | Scrum-half, Stand-off | 76 | 25 | 2 | 0 | 79 | England | |
| 163 | John Sutton | | | 2 | 0 | 0 | 0 | 0 | | |
| 542 | Thomas Sutton | | | 144 | 19 | 30 | 0 | 117 | | |
| 745 | Cyril Sykes | | | 2 | 0 | 0 | 0 | 0 | | |
| 166 | Roger Sykes | | | 44 | 6 | 2 | 0 | 22 | | |
| 970 | Whetu Taewa | 1999-02 | Wing, Centre | 150 | 24 | 0 | 0 | 96 | | |
| 1270 | Brad Takairangi | 2021-22 | Second-row, Loose-forward, Centre, Stand-off | 24 | 4 | 0 | 0 | 16 | Cook Islands; New Zealand | |
| 1095 | Ryan Tandy | 2007 | Prop | 12 | 2 | 0 | 0 | 8 | Ireland | |
| 1054 | David Tangata-Toa | 2005-07 | Prop | 77 | 14 | 0 | 0 | 56 | | |
| 1305 | Kelepi Tanginoa | 2024-25 | Prop, Second-row, Loose-forward | 59 | 16 | 0 | 0 | 64 | | Joined Warrington Wolves |
| 518 | Gerry Tate | 195?-?? | | | | | | | | |
| 1263 | Will Tate | 2020-23 | Wing, Centre, Fullback | 16 | 4 | 0 | 0 | 16 | | |
| 355 | Ted Tattersfield | 1935-37 | Second-row, Loose-forward | 148 | 27 | 44 | 0 | 169 | England | |
| 1024 | Latham Tawhai | 2003 | Scrum-half | 26 | 8 | 3 | 4 | 42 | | |
| 999 | Andrew Taylor | 2000-03 | Fullback | 4 | 0 | 0 | 0 | 0 | | |
| 370 | J. Taylor | 1932-33 | | 3 | 0 | 0 | 0 | 0 | | |
| 630 | John Taylor | 1959-65; 1967-69 | | 195+2 | 48 | 1 | 0 | 146 | | |
| 60 | J.W. Taylor | 1899-05 | | 47 | 1 | 1 | 0 | 5 | | |
| 470 | J.W. Taylor | | | 3 | 0 | 0 | 0 | 0 | | |
| 862 | Ross Taylor | 1987-88 | Prop | 17 | 2 | 0 | 0 | 8 | New Zealand | |
| 1116 | Scott Taylor | 2009-12 | Prop, Loose-forward | 52 | 9 | 0 | 0 | 36 | England | |
| 151 | Tom Taylor | | | 34 | 4 | 0 | 0 | 12 | | |
| 1298 | Leo Tennison | 2023-present | Prop, Second-row | 2 | 0 | 0 | 0 | 0 | | |
| 332 | S. Tetlow | 1927-28 | | 3 | 0 | 0 | 0 | 0 | | |
| 310 | A. E. Thomas | | | 6 | 0 | 1 | 0 | 2 | | |
| 455 | D. Thomas | 193?-?? | | | | | | | | |
| 183 | Dai Thomas | 190?-?? | | 8 | 2 | 0 | 0 | 6 | | This may be the same person who played for Oldham |
| 1297 | Luke Thomas | 2023 | Prop | 1 | 0 | 0 | 0 | 0 | | Loaned from Warrington Wolves |
| 169 | Phil Thomas | 1911-?? | Centre | 102 | 26 | 0 | 0 | 78 | Great Britain; Wales | |
| 645 | Albert Thompson | | | 15 | 0 | 0 | 0 | 0 | | |
| 958 | Alex Thompson | 1997-99 | Prop | 5 | 0 | 0 | 0 | 0 | | |
| 857 | Andy Thompson | 1986-94 | Centre, Fullback | 163 | 23 | 0 | 0 | 92 | | |
| 1202 | Dave Thompson | 2016 | Wing | 3 | 0 | 0 | 0 | 0 | | Loaned from Warrington Wolves |
| 406 | F. Thompson | | | 67 | 1 | 0 | 0 | 3 | | |
| 304 | H. Thompson | | | 15 | 0 | 0 | 0 | 0 | | |
| 591 | Peter Thompson | | | 12 | 1 | 0 | 0 | 3 | | |
| 1041 | Scott Thorburn | 2004 | Scrum-half, Stand-off | 9 | 1 | 13 | 0 | 30 | | |
| 1195 | Iain Thornley | 2016 | Centre | 30 | 12 | 0 | 0 | 48 | | |
| 575 | Maurice Thornton | | | 61 | 10 | 0 | 0 | 30 | | |
| 1227 | Danny Tickle | 2018 | Prop, Second-row | 26 | 4 | 31 | 0 | 78 | England | |
| 1186 | Dane Tilse | 2015-16 | Prop | 48 | 4 | 0 | 0 | 12 | | |
| 1231 | Joel Tomkins | 2018-19 | Second-row | 35 | 6 | 0 | 0 | 24 | England | |
| 344 | W. Tomlinson | | | 3 | 0 | 0 | 0 | 0 | | |
| 522 | Jim Tong | | | 148 | 10 | 0 | 0 | 30 | | |
| 740 | Les Tonks | 1970-71 | Prop | 2 | 0 | 0 | 0 | 0 | | Loaned from Featherstone Rovers |
| 847 | Andy Tosney | 1985-86 | Stand-off | 2 | 0 | 0 | 0 | 0 | | Loaned from Wakefield Trinity |
| 76 | A. Townend | | | 3 | 0 | 0 | 0 | 0 | | |
| 37 | C.S. Townend | | | 7 | 0 | 0 | 0 | 0 | | |
| 93 | R. Townsley | | | 83 | 1 | 0 | 0 | 3 | | |
| 656 | Charles Trowell | | | 21 | 0 | 0 | 0 | 0 | | |
| 1251 | Kyle Trout | 2019-20 | Prop, Loose-forward | 16 | 0 | 0 | 0 | 0 | | |
| 208 | Len Trump | 1912-?? | Forward | 103 | 10 | 0 | 0 | 30 | | |
| 1148 | Evarn Tuimavave | 2015 | Prop | 23 | 2 | 0 | 0 | 8 | | |
| 510 | Geoff Tullock | 1951-5? | Wing | 167 | 66 | 0 | 0 | 198 | England | |
| 15 | Herbert Tullock | | | 65 | 33 | 18 | 0 | 135 | | |
| 545 | Derek Turner | 1950-55 | Second-row, Loose-forward | 141 | 27 | 0 | 0 | 81 | Great Britain; England | |
| 777 | Glyn Turner | 1974-78 | Centre, Stand-off | 36+14 | 25 | 3 | 0 | 81 | Wales | |
| 802 | Graham Tyreman | | | 13 | 2 | 0 | 0 | 6 | | |
| 790 | Colin Tyrer | 1976-78 | Fullback | 31 | 4 | 106 | 0 | 224 | | |
| 663 | Brian Tyson | 1961–67 | Prop | 231 | 16 | 0 | 0 | 48 | Great Britain | |
| 1167 | Wayne Ulugia | 2014 | Wing, Centre | 3 | 1 | 0 | 0 | 4 | | |
| 139 | George Unsworth | | | 31 | 0 | 0 | 0 | 0 | | |
| 196 | R. Upton | | | 1 | 0 | 0 | 0 | 0 | | |
| 1228 | Taioalo Vaivai | 2018-19 | Centre | 35 | 14 | 0 | 0 | 56 | United States | |
| 291 | Tank van Rooyen | 1922-23 | Second-row | 35 | 7 | 0 | 0 | 21 | | |
| 885 | Paul Vannet | 1989-92; 1994 | Prop, Second-row | 45 | 4 | 0 | 0 | 16 | | |
| 977 | Marcus Vassilakopoulos | 1999 | Stand-off, Hooker | | | | | | | |
| 234 | D. Vaughan | | | 25 | 8 | 0 | 0 | 24 | | |
| 1086 | Michael Vella | 2007–11 | Prop, Second-row, Loose-forward | 121 | 14 | 0 | 0 | 56 | Australia; Malta | |
| 1268 | Albert Vete | 2021-22 | Prop | 32 | 8 | 0 | 0 | 32 | Tonga | |
| 260 | E. W. Wagstaff | | | 2 | 0 | 0 | 0 | 0 | | |
| 702 | David Wainwright | | | 91+9 | 12 | 2 | 0 | 40 | | |
| 94 | A. Walker | | | 2 | 0 | 0 | 0 | 0 | | |
| 1147 | Adam Walker | 2013–16 | Prop | 107 | 9 | 0 | 0 | 36 | Scotland | |
| 329 | C. B. Walker | | | 1 | 0 | 0 | 0 | 0 | | |
| 1104 | Chev Walker | 2008-10 | Centre, Second-row, Loose-forward | 34 | 5 | 0 | 0 | 20 | Great Britain; England | |
| 471 | G. Walker | | | 5 | 1 | 0 | 0 | 3 | | |
| 571 | Gerald Walker | | | | | | | | | |
| 1290 | Jack Walker | 2023 | Fullback | 10 | 5 | 0 | 0 | 20 | | |
| 1003 | Jimmy Walker | 2001-05 | Scrum-half, Stand-off | 73 | 28 | 0 | 1 | 113 | | |
| 1165 | Jonathan Walker | 2014 | Prop | 7 | 0 | 0 | 0 | 0 | Scotland | |
| 694 | Peter Walker | | | 16+1 | 3 | 0 | 0 | 9 | | |
| 782 | Richard Wallace | 1975-77 | Fullback, Centre, Stand-off | 43+4 | 3 | 0 | 2 | 11 | Wales | |
| 686 | Cliff Wallis | | | 138+15 | 14 | 2 | 0 | 46 | | |
| 1230 | Elliot Wallis | 2018-21 | Wing | 5 | 2 | 0 | 0 | 8 | | |
| 1225 | Jordan Walne | 2018 | Prop, Second-row, Loose-forward | 8 | 0 | 0 | 0 | 0 | | |
| 819 | Jamie Walsh | 1981-82 | Scrum-half | 23+3 | 3 | 0 | 0 | 9 | | |
| 840 | Michael Walsh | 1983-85 | Wing | 2 | 0 | 0 | 0 | 0 | | |
| 390 | Harold Walshaw | | | 22 | 1 | 0 | 0 | 3 | | |
| 581 | Ralph Walters | | Hooker | 37 | 0 | 0 | 0 | 0 | | |
| 1087 | Danny Ward | 2007 | Prop | 21 | 0 | 0 | 0 | 0 | Great Britain | |
| 28 | T. Ward | | | 42 | 2 | 1 | 0 | 8 | | |
| 1201 | Joe Wardill | 2016-19 | Wing | 17 | 5 | 0 | 0 | 20 | | |
| 906 | Neil Wardrobe | 1992-96 | Centre, Stand-off, Scrum-half | 36 | 8 | 2 | 0 | 36 | | |
| 1313 | Jared Waerea-Hargreaves | 2025 | Prop | 24 | 1 | 0 | 0 | 4 | New Zealand | |
| 535 | G. Warters | | | 17 | 1 | 0 | 0 | 3 | | |
| 1040 | Frank Watene | 2004 | Prop, Second-row | 30 | 4 | 0 | 0 | 16 | Tonga | |
| 255 | J. Waterworth | | | 7 | 2 | 0 | 0 | 6 | | |
| 791 | David Watkinson | 1977-89 | Prop, Hooker, Second-row | 173+7 | 7 | 0 | 3 | 24 | Great Britain; England | |
| 186 | A. Watson | | | 68 | 9 | 2 | 0 | 31 | | |
| 774 | Bernard Watson | | | 177+12 | 44 | 2 | 6 | 142 | | |
| 888 | Dave Watson | 1990-91 | Fullback, Centre, Stand-off | 29 | 13 | 0 | 0 | 52 | New Zealand | |
| 804 | Kevin Watson | 1980-84 | Prop, Second-row | 32 | 2 | 0 | 0 | 6 | | |
| 22 | R. H. Watson | | | 24 | 9 | 0 | 0 | 27 | | |
| 250 | S. Watson | | | 5 | 3 | 0 | 0 | 9 | | |
| 1108 | Liam Watts | 2008-12 | Prop, Loose-forward | 63 | 7 | 0 | 0 | 28 | | |
| 487 | Sio Waxman | | | 1 | 0 | 0 | 0 | 0 | | |
| 296 | Charles Webb | | | 42 | 2 | 0 | 0 | 6 | | Is this the NZ player? |
| 951 | David Webber | 1997 | Loose-forward | 6 | 0 | 0 | 0 | 0 | | |
| 1105 | Jake Webster | 2008–12 | Wing, Centre, Stand-off | 105 | 41 | 7 | 0 | 178 | | |
| 1055 | James Webster | 2005-08 | Scrum-half | 94 | 33 | 7 | 9 | 155 | | |
| 1077 | Pat Weisner | 2007 | Hooker, Stand-off, Scrum-half, Loose-forward | 20 | 7 | 14 | 3 | 59 | Ireland | |
| 1080 | Kris Welham | 2006–15 | Centre | 191 | 102 | 2 | 0 | 412 | | |
| 1081 | Liam Welham | 2006 | Centre | 2 | | | | | | |
| 501 | Harold Welsby | | | 45 | 4 | 0 | 0 | 12 | | |
| 69 | George West | 1901–08 | Wing | 218 | 98 | 45 | 0 | 384 | | |
| 272 | Bill Westerdale | | | 319 | 45 | 3 | 0 | 141 | | |
| 309 | Frank Westerdale | | | 42 | 4 | 1 | 0 | 14 | | |
| 1164 | Michael Weyman | 2014-15 | Prop | 24 | 7 | 0 | 0 | 28 | Australia | |
| 363 | A. Wheatley | | | 1 | 0 | 0 | 0 | 0 | | |
| 278 | L. Wheeldon | | | 3 | 0 | 0 | 0 | 0 | | |
| 1112 | Scott Wheeldon | 2009-12 | Prop | 75 | 4 | 0 | 0 | 16 | | |
| 1304 | Jai Whitbread | 2024-present | Prop | 17 | 0 | 0 | 0 | 8 | | |
| 109 | G. Whitcombe | | | 10 | 0 | 0 | 0 | 0 | | |
| 826 | Brendan White | 1982 | Second-row | 3+1 | 0 | 0 | 0 | 0 | | |
| 412 | George White | | | 71 | 1 | 0 | 0 | 3 | | |
| 171 | Patrick White | | | 4 | 0 | 0 | 0 | 0 | | |
| 1323 | Tom Whitehead | 2026-present | Second-row, loose-forward | 3 | 2 | 0 | 0 | 8 | | |
| 245 | G. Whiting | | | 2 | 0 | 0 | 0 | 0 | | |
| 941 | Sam Whittaker | 1995-96 | | 1 | 1 | 0 | 0 | 4 | | |
| 1076 | Jon Whittle | 2006 | Centre | 5 | 1 | 0 | 0 | 4 | | |
| 414 | G. Whitton | | | 32 | 1 | 5 | 0 | 13 | | |
| 440 | Wilfred Whitworth | 193?-?? | Centre | 36 | 6 | 10 | 0 | 38 | | |
| 1049 | Loz Wildbore | 2004-05 | Fullback | 14 | 3 | 40 | 0 | 92 | | |
| 894 | Mark Wildbridge | 1990-91 | Wing | 1 | 0 | 0 | 0 | 0 | | |
| 726 | Steve Wiley | | | 88+7 | 8 | 0 | 0 | 24 | | |
| 1000 | Jon Wilkin | 2000-02 | Loose-forward, Second-row | 39 | 8 | 0 | 1 | 33 | | |
| 262 | Alfred E. Wilkinson | | | 18 | 3 | 3 | 0 | 15 | | |
| 265 | John H. Wilkinson | 1920–28 | Prop | 263 | 17 | 2 | 0 | 55 | | |
| 268 | John R. Wilkinson | 1920–28 | Prop | 273 | 8 | 0 | 0 | 24 | | |
| 731 | Ron Willett | 1969- | Wing, Centre | 12 | 1 | 10 | 0 | 23 | | |
| 55 | C. Williams | | | 21 | 2 | 1 | 0 | 8 | | |
| 1071 | Desi Williams | 2006 | Wing | 2 | 0 | 0 | 0 | 0 | | |
| 340 | Harry Williams | | | 109 | 21 | 0 | 0 | 63 | | |
| 446 | Arthur Wilmot | | | 125 | 6 | 0 | 0 | 18 | | |
| 372 | A.H. Wilson | | | 3 | 0 | 0 | 0 | 0 | | |
| 975 | Colin Wilson | 1999-?? | Prop, Second-row, Loose-forward | | 0 | 0 | 0 | 0 | Scotland | |
| 1025 | Dave Wilson | 2003-06 | Wing, Prop | 19 | | | | | | |
| 617 | Ernie Wilson | | | 50 | 11 | 0 | 0 | 33 | | |
| 345 | George Wilson | | | 7 | 0 | 0 | 0 | 0 | | |
| 36 | H. Wilson | | | 20 | 0 | 0 | 0 | 0 | | |
| 42 | R. Wilson | | | 7 | 0 | 0 | 0 | 0 | | |
| 997 | Richard Wilson | 2001-04 | Prop | 77 | 3 | 0 | 0 | 12 | | |
| 945 | Rob Wilson | 1996-97; 2001-02 | Second-row | 68 | 16 | 0 | 0 | 64 | | |
| 333 | W. Wilson | | | 2 | 0 | 0 | 0 | 0 | | |
| 110 | H. Wiltshire | | | 7 | 0 | 0 | 0 | 0 | | |
| 29 | Andrew Windle | 1899–1908 | Forward | 238 | 7 | 0 | 0 | 21 | | |
| 953 | Johan Windley | 1997 | Scrum-half, Stand-off | 4 | 1 | 0 | 0 | 4 | | |
| 904 | Phil Windley | 1985-90; 1992 | Scrum-half | 95 | 17 | 0 | 0 | 68 | | |
| 754 | Derek Windmill | | | 41+13 | 3 | 7 | 0 | 23 | | |
| 480 | Roy Winfield | | | | | | | | | |
| 118 | A. Wimpenny | | | 14 | 2 | 0 | 0 | 6 | | |
| 404 | F. Winsor | | | 35 | 3 | 0 | 0 | 9 | | |
| 1135 | Lincoln Withers | 2012-13 | Stand-off, Hooker | 42 | 10 | 0 | 0 | 40 | | |
| 380 | A. Wood | | | 55 | 25 | 0 | 0 | 75 | | |
| 1020 | Martin Wood | 2002 | Stand-off, Loose-forward | 6 | 0 | 0 | 0 | 0 | | |
| 1272 | Sam Wood | 2022-23 | Wing, Centre | 33 | 9 | 4 | 0 | 44 | | |
| 381 | John Woodcock | | | 31 | 9 | 0 | 0 | 27 | | |
| 761 | Bob Woodhead | | | 1+4 | 1 | 4 | 0 | 11 | | |
| 734 | Anthony Woodhouse | | | 1+1 | 0 | 0 | 0 | 0 | | |
| 1330 | Alfie Woods | 2026-present | | 1 | 0 | 0 | 0 | 0 | | |
| 994 | Ryan Woods | | | | | | | | | |
| 727 | Bill Woolford | | Hooker, Second-row | 6+1 | 0 | 0 | 0 | 0 | | |
| 235 | W. T. Wootton | | | 60 | 10 | 65 | 0 | 160 | | |
| 63 | A. Wray | | | 4 | 0 | 0 | 0 | 0 | | |
| 974 | Jon Wray | 1999-00 | Wing | 2 | 0 | 0 | 0 | 0 | | |
| 699 | Brian Wrigglesworth | 1965-66 | Fullback, Centre, Stand-off | 21+2 | 10 | 0 | 0 | 30 | | |
| 99 | J.W. Wright | | | 1 | 0 | 0 | 0 | 0 | | |
| 717 | Geoff Wriglesworth | 1972 | Wing, Centre | 51 | 17 | 0 | 0 | 51 | Great Britain | |
| 1292 | Fouad Yaha | 2023 | Wing | 2 | 0 | 0 | 0 | 0 | France | Loaned from Catalans Dragons |
| 982 | Scott Yeaman | 1999-01 | Scrum-half | 14 | 2 | 1 | 0 | 10 | | |
| 338 | A. Young | | | 3 | 0 | 0 | 0 | 0 | | |
| 536 | C. Young | 1950-52 | | 2 | 0 | 0 | 0 | 0 | | |
| 688 | Chris Young | 1963-69 | Wing | 163+1 | 85 | 0 | 0 | 255 | Great Britain | |
| 534 | George Young | 1950-55 | | 51 | 1 | 0 | 0 | 3 | | |
| 695 | Gordon Young | 1965-75 | | 82+14 | 4 | 0 | 0 | 12 | | |
| 420 | Vic Young | | | 61 | 12 | 17 | 0 | 70 | | |
| 792 | Wally Youngman | | Wing | 52+3 | 23 | 0 | 0 | 69 | | |
| 1291 | Tanguy Zenon | 2023 | Wing, Fullback | 3 | 1 | 0 | 0 | 4 | France | Loaned from Catalans Dragons |

- ^¹ = Played For Hull Kingston Rovers During More Than One Period
- ^² = drop-goals are currently worth 1-point, but from the 1897–98 to prior to the 1973-74 all goals, whether; conversions, penalties, or drop-goals, scored two points, consequently during this time drop-goals were often not explicitly documented, and "0" indicates that drop-goals may not have been recorded, rather than no drop-goals scored. In addition, prior to the 1949–50, the Field-goal was also still a valid means of scoring points
- ^³ = During the first two seasons of the Northern Union (now known as the Rugby Football League), i.e. the 1895–96 and 1896–97, conversions were worth 2-points, penalty goals 3-points and drop goals 4-points.
- BBC = BBC2 Floodlit Trophy
- CC = Challenge Cup
- CF = Championship Final
- CM = Captain Morgan Trophy
- RT = League Cup, i.e. Player's № 6, John Player (Special), Regal Trophy
- YC = Yorkshire County Cup
- YL = Yorkshire League
