= Albert Kemp =

Albert Kemp may refer to:

- Albert Kemp (rugby), rugby union and rugby league player in the 1890s and 1900s
- Albert Edward Kemp (1858–1929), Canadian businessman and politician
