= Raymond Maskill =

English rugby league footballer

Ray Maskill
Personal information
- Full name: Raymond Eitel Maskill
- Born: fourth 1/4 1905; Pontefract district, England
- Died: unknown

Playing information
- Position: Prop, Second-row
Club
Years	Team	Pld	T	G	FG	P
1928–31	Castleford	20	1	0	0	3
1932–34	Wakefield Trinity	31	0	0	0	0
1936–46	Hull Kingston Rovers	115	8	0	0	24
	Total	166	9	0	0	27

Raymond Eitel Maskill (fourth 1/4 1905 – death unknown) was an English professional rugby league footballer who played in the 1920s, 1930s and 1940s. He played at club level for Castleford, Wakefield Trinity and Hull Kingston Rovers, as a prop or second-row.

== Background ==
Raymond Maskill's birth was registered in Pontefract district, West Riding of Yorkshire, England.

== Playing career ==
=== Club career ===
Raymond Maskill made his début for Castleford on Saturday 17 November 1928, he played his last match for Castleford on Saturday 3 October 1931, he transferred from Castleford to Wakefield Trinity, he made his début for Wakefield Trinity during February 1932, he played his last match for Wakefield Trinity during September 1934, he transferred from Wakefield Trinity to Hull Kingston Rovers, he made his début for the Hull Kingston Rovers on Saturday 29 August 1936, and he played his last match for the Hull Kingston Rovers on Saturday 12 January 1946.

== Note ==
"The Robins: An Official History of Hull Kingston Rovers" has Raymond Maskill playing 115-matches, scoring 8-tries for 24-points, whereas "Hull Kingston Rovers - A Centenary History 1883-1983" has him playing 114-matches, scoring 7-tries for 21-points.
