= Dennis Scholes =

English rugby league footballer

Personal information
- Full name: Dennis Scholes
- Born: August 1928
- Died: January 2016 (aged 85)

Playing information
- Position: Fullback, Second-row, Utility
Club
Years	Team	Pld	T	G	FG	P
1947–51	Hull Kingston Rovers	129	25	0	0	75
1951–56	Leeds	111	57	1	0	173
1956–57	Featherstone Rovers	43	23	0	0	69
1957–58	Hull Kingston Rovers			0	0
1958–60	Doncaster	46	6	9	0	36
	Total	329	111	10	0	353

Dennis Scholes (August 1928 – January 2016) was a professional rugby league footballer who played in the 1940s, 1950s and 1960s. He played at club level for Maybury Youth Club ARLFC (in Kingston upon Hull), Hull Kingston Rovers (two spells), Leeds, Featherstone Rovers, Doncaster, as a fullback, second-row or utility player.

== Playing career ==
Dennis Scholes was signed by Hull Kingston Rovers during 1946, he made his début for Hull Kingston Rovers against Liverpool Stanley at Old Craven Park, Kingston upon Hull during December 1947. He was transferred from Hull Kingston Rovers to Leeds (having scored a hat-trick of tries against Leeds two-weeks earlier) during November 1951 for a transfer fee of £4,000 (based on increases in average earnings, this would be approximately £305,100 in 2017).

Dennis Scholes played in Leeds' victory in the Yorkshire League during the 1954–55 season.

He was transferred from Leeds to Featherstone Rovers, he made his début for Featherstone Rovers on Saturday 15 September 1956, and he played his last match for Featherstone Rovers during the 1957–58 season. He was transferred from Featherstone Rovers to Hull Kingston Rovers, and was one of new coach; Colin Hutton's first signings, he played his last match for Hull Kingston Rovers against York at Old Craven Park, Kingston upon Hull on Friday 26 December 1958. He was transferred from Hull Kingston Rovers to Doncaster.
