= Kieran Allen =

English rugby league footballer

Personal information
- Full name: Kieran Allen
- Born: 21 November 1975 (age 50)

Playing information
- Position: Fullback, Stand-off
Club
Years	Team	Pld	T	G	FG	P
1991–96	Wakefield Trinity	105	6	1	0	26
1996	→Hull KR	6	2	0	0	8
1997	Bramley R.L.F.C.	2	1	0	0	4
1999–00	Doncaster R.L.F.C.
2002	Hunslet Hawks	8	2	10	0	28
	Total	121	11	11	0	66

Kieran Allen (born November 21, 1975) is a former professional rugby league footballer who played in the 1990s and 2000s. He played at club level for Wakefield Trinity, Hull Kingston Rovers 1996 RFL Division Two title winning team and Hunslet Hawks, as a fullback, or stand-off. He also represented England School boys as captain, then Great Britain rugby league.
