= Albert Kemp (rugby) =

English rugby union & league player

Personal information
- Full name: Albert Kemp
- Born: c. 1877 unknown
- Died: February 1938 (aged 61) unknown

Playing information

Rugby union
Club
Years	Team	Pld	T	G	FG	P
≤1896/97–99	Hull Kingston Rovers
Representative
Years	Team	Pld	T	G	FG	P
≤1896/97–≥96–97	Yorkshire

Rugby league
- Position: Forward
Club
Years	Team	Pld	T	G	FG	P
1899–≥05	Hull Kingston Rovers	178	24	25	0	122
Representative
Years	Team	Pld	T	G	FG	P
1897–99	Yorkshire	4	1	0	0	3

Albert E. Kemp (c. 1877 – February 1938) was a rugby union and professional rugby league footballer who played in the 1890s and 1900s. (Note: Not to be confused with the rugby league footballer who played in the 1920s for Castleford) He played representative level rugby union (RU) for Yorkshire, and at club level for Hull Kingston Rovers, and representative level rugby league (RL) for Yorkshire, and at club level for Hull Kingston Rovers, as a forward.

== Playing career ==
=== Challenge Cup Final appearances ===
Albert Kemp played as a forward in Hull Kingston Rovers' 0–6 defeat by Warrington in the 1905 Challenge Cup Final during the 1904–05 season at Headingley, Leeds on Saturday 29 April 1905, in front of a crowd of 19,638.
