= 2009 Hull Kingston Rovers season =

English rugby league team season

Hull Kingston Rovers 2009 season
- Super League XIV Rank: 4th
- Play-off result: Preliminary semi-finals
- Challenge Cup: Quarter-finals
- 2009 record: Wins: 18; draws: 1; losses: 12
- Points scored: For: 650; against: 516

Team information
- Chairman: Neil Hudgell
- Head coach: Justin Morgan
- Captain: Shaun Briscoe (12) Michael Vella (7) Clint Newton (1)
- Stadium: Craven Park
- Avg. attendance: 8,161

Top scorers
- Tries: Peter Fox (19)
- Goals: Michael Dobson (100)
- Points: Michael Dobson (276)
← 2008	List of seasons	2010 →

In 2009, Hull Kingston Rovers, competing in their 128th season of rugby league, played in their third Super League season as well as in the 2009 Challenge Cup.

== Preseason friendlies ==
Date and time	Versus	H/A	Venue	Result	Score	Tries	Goals	Attendance	Report
25 January; 15:00	Batley Bulldogs	A	Mount Pleasant	W	16–4	I'Anson, Briscoe, Walker	Dobson (2/3)		
29 January; 15:00	Warrington Wolves	A	Halliwell Jones Stadium	W	32–24	Fisher (2), Fitzhenry, Dobson, Cockayne, Fox	Dobson (5/6)		
1 February, 15:00	York City Knights	A	Huntington Stadium	L	12–14	Gay, L. Welham	Spaven (2/2)	1,403	
6 February, 15:00	Salford City Reds	H	Craven Park	W	18–16			3,570	

== Super League ==
=== Fixtures ===
Date and time	Versus	H/A	Venue	Result	Score	Tries	Goals	Attendance	Pos.	Report
15 February, 15:00	Bradford Bulls	A	Grattan Stadium	D	13–13	Fox (2)	Dobson (2/2); Drop-goals: Dobson	12,141	10th	
20 February, 20:00	Leeds Rhinos	H	Craven Park	L	10–19	Briscoe	Dobson (1/1 + 2 pen.)	8,623	11th	
27 February, 20:00	St Helens	A	GPW Recruitment Stadium	W	20–19	Galea, Fox, Webster	Dobson (3/3 + 1 pen.)	11,830	8th	
8 March, 15:00	Wakefield Trinity Wildcats	H	Craven Park	W	31–18	Briscoe, Colbon, Fisher, Murrell, Newton	Dobson (5/5); Drop-goals: Dobson	9,038	7th	
15 March, 15:00	Celtic Crusaders	H	Craven Park	W	48–18	Newton (3), Welham, Fozzard, Walker, Galea, Dobson	Dobson (6/9)	8,046	6th	
22 March, 15:00	Warrington Wolves	A	Halliwell Jones Stadium	L	12–24	Fox, Aizue	Dobson (2/2)	8,457	8th	
29 March, 15:00	Salford City Reds	H	Craven Park	W	48–12	Fox (3), Dobson (3), Welham (2), Murrell	Dobson (6/9)	8,104	3rd	
10 April, 13:00 (Good Friday)	Hull F.C.	A	KC Stadium	W	18–14	Webster, Cooke, Fox	Dobson (3/3)	22,377	6th	
13 April, 14:00	Huddersfield Giants	H	Craven Park	L	8–30	Welham, Colbon	Dobson (0/2)	8,731	6th	
19 April, 15:00	Harlequins RL	A	Twickenham Stoop	W	32–12	Galea (2), Welham, Fox, Cooke, Colbon	Dobson (4/6)	3,492	5th	
26 April, 15:00	Catalans Dragons	H	Craven Park	W	44–10	Galea (2), Webster (2), Colbon, Murrell, Dobson, Fisher	Dobson (6/8)	8,115	3rd	
3 May, 19:00 (Magic Weekend)	Warrington Wolves	N	Murrayfield Stadium	W	36–28	Galea (2), Briscoe, Dobson, Murrell, Vella	Dobson (7/7)	30,122	1st	
15 May, 20:00	Wigan Warriors	A	JJB Stadium	W	20–12	Dobson, Cooke, Webster	Dobson (3/3 + 1 pen.)	13,415	2nd	
22 May, 20:00	Castleford Tigers	H	Craven Park	W	16–6	Briscoe (2), Fox	Dobson (2/3)	8,104	2nd	
5 June, 20:00	Huddersfield Giants	A	Galpharm Stadium	L	6–22	Welham	Dobson (1/1)	6,436	2nd	
12 June, 20:00	Harlequins RL	H	Craven Park	L	10–40	Gene, Wheeldon	Dobson (1/2)	7,874	3rd	
20 June, 18:00	Celtic Crusaders	A	Brewery Field	W	32–18	Newton (2), Netherton, Welham, Dobson, Briscoe	Dobson (4/6)	3,015	3rd	
28 June, 18:15	Wigan Warriors	H	Craven Park	L	28–36	Fox (2), Vella, Fitzhenry, Webster	Dobson (4/5)	9,007	3rd	
4 July, 20:00 (BST)	Catalans Dragons	A	Stade Gilbert Brutus	L	12–23	Cockayne, Fitzhenry	Dobson (2/2)	9,073	4th	
12 July, 15:00	Bradford Bulls	H	Craven Park	W	32–12	Colbon (2), Welham (2), Murrell, Fitzhenry	Dobson (4/7)	8,206	4th	
17 July, 20:00	Leeds Rhinos	A	Headingley Carnegie Stadium	L	14–24	Cockayne, Welham	Dobson (2/2 + 1 pen.)	16,192	4th	
25 July, 18:00	Hull F.C.	H	Craven Park	W	24–18	Cooke (2), Dobson, Webster	Dobson (4/4)	9,450	4th	
2 August, 15:30	Castleford Tigers	A	The Jungle	W	46–28	Briscoe (3), Fox (2), Dobson (2), Colbon	Dobson (7/8)	8,709	4th	
16 August, 15:00	St Helens	H	Craven Park	W	26–10	Fitzhenry (2), Welham, Webster, Fox	Dobson (3/5)	8,976	3rd	
21 August, 20:00	Salford City Reds	A	The Willows	W	14–10	Newton, Briscoe	Dobson (2/2 + 1 pen.)	4,224	3rd	
5 September, 17:30	Warrington Wolves	H	Craven Park	W	40–16	Newton (3), Webster, Cooke, Welham, Fox	Dobson (6/7	8,579	3rd	
12 September, 18:00	Wakefield Trinity Wildcats	A	Hearwell Stadium	L	10–24	Newton, Fox	Dobson (1/2)	6,328	4th	

=== Table ===
Pos	Team	Pld	W	D	L	PF	PA	PD	Pts	Qualification
1	Leeds Rhinos (L, C)	27	21	0	6	805	453	+352	42	Play-offs
2	St Helens	27	19	0	8	733	466	+267	38	Play-offs
3	Huddersfield Giants	27	18	0	9	690	416	+274	36	Play-offs
4	Hull Kingston Rovers	27	17	1	9	650	516	+134	35	Play-offs
5	Wakefield Trinity Wildcats	27	16	0	11	685	609	+76	32	Play-offs
6	Wigan Warriors	27	15	0	12	659	551	+108	30	Play-offs
7	Castleford Tigers	27	14	0	13	645	702	−57	28	Play-offs
8	Catalans Dragons	27	13	0	14	613	660	−47	26	Play-offs
9	Bradford Bulls	27	12	1	14	653	668	−15	25	
10	Warrington Wolves	27	12	0	15	649	705	−56	24	
11	Harlequins	27	11	0	16	591	691	−100	22	
12	Hull F.C.	27	10	0	17	502	623	−121	20	
13	Salford City Reds	27	7	0	20	456	754	−298	14	
14	Celtic Crusaders	27	3	0	24	357	874	−517	6	

Source: Rugby League Project
Rules for classification: 1) Points; 2) Points difference; 3) Number of points scored;
(C) Champions; (L) League Leaders' Shield Winners

=== Play-offs ===
Date and time	Round	Versus	H/A	Venue	Result	Score	Tries	Goals	Attendance	Report
18 September; 20:00	Qualifying/Elimination playoffs	Leeds Rhinos	A	Headingley Carnegie Stadium	L	8–44	Fitzhenry	Dobson (1/1 + 1 pen.)	11,220	
26 September, 15:00	Preliminary semi-finals	Wigan Warriors	H	Craven Park	L	16–30	Welham, Fox, I'Anson	Dobson (2/3)	8,162	

== Challenge Cup ==
Date and time	Round	Versus	H/A	Venue	Result	Score	Tries	Goals	Attendance	Report
3 April; 20:00	Round 4	Celtic Crusaders	H	Craven Park	W	32–6	Welham, Newton, Fitzhenry, Colbon, Webster	Dobson (5/5 + 1 pen.)	7,104	
10 May; 15:00	Round 5	Sheffield Eagles	H	Craven Park	W	34–24	Fisher (2), Welham, Gene, Newton, Briscoe	Dobson (5/5)	4,955	
30 May; 17:30	Quarter-finals	Warrington Wolves	H	Craven Park	L	24–25 (g.p.)	Welham, Newton, Galea, Webster	Dobson (3/4 + 1 pen.)	7,671	

== Transfers ==
=== Gains ===
Player	Club	Contract	Date
(Australia) Michael Dobson	Canberra Raiders	2 1/2 Years	May 2008
(England) Scott Wheeldon	Hull F.C.	2 Years	September 2008
(England) Ryan Esders	York City Knights	1 Year	September 2008
(England) Liam Colbon	Wigan Warriors	2 Years	September 2008
(England) Nick Fozzard	St Helens	2 Years	September 2008

=== Losses ===
Player	Club	Contract	Date
(Australia) James Webster	N/A	Released	May 2008
(England) Chris Chester	N/A	Retirement	August 2008
(England) Kirk Netherton	Castleford Tigers	1 Year	September 2008
(England) Luke Menzies	Batley Bulldogs		2008
(Scotland) Jon Steel	Featherstone Rovers		2008

=== Loans ===
Player	Club	Loan period	Date
(England) Kyle Bibb	Wakefield Trinity Wildcats	1 month	July 2009

== Squad ==
2009 Hull Kingston Rovers Squad
First team squad			Coaching staff
1 (England) Shaun Briscoe – FB (C); 2 (England) Peter Fox – WG; 3 (England) Chev Walker – CE; 4 (New Zealand) Jake Webster – CE; 5 (England) Liam Colbon – WG; 6 (England) Paul Cooke – SO; 7 (Australia) Michael Dobson – SH (GK); 8 (England) Nick Fozzard – PR; 9 (Scotland) Ben Fisher – HK; 10 (Wales) David Mills – PR; 11 (United States) Clint Newton – SR; 12 (Australia) Ben Galea – SR	13 (England) Scott Murrell – LF; 14 (Papua New Guinea) Stanley Gene – UT; 15 (Australia) Daniel Fitzhenry – WG; 16 (England) Jason Netherton – SR; 17 (Papua New Guinea) Makali Aizue – PR; 18 (England) Scott Wheeldon – PR; 19 (England) Kris Welham – CE; 20 (Australia) Michael Vella – FB; 21 (England) Chaz I'Anson – SH; 22 (England) Liam Watts – PR; 23 (England) Ryan Esders – LF; 24 (Australia) Rhys Lovegrove – CE	25 (England) Scott Spaven – SR; 28 (England) Ben Cockayne – FB	Head coach: (Australia) Justin Morgan; Legend: (c) Captain(s); (vc) Vice-captain(s); (gk) = Goal kicker
