= 2010 Hull Kingston Rovers season =

English rugby league team season

Hull Kingston Rovers 2010 season
- Super League XV Rank: 7th
- Play-off result: Preliminary semi-finals
- Challenge Cup: Fourth round
- 2010 record: Wins: 14; draws: 1; losses: 13
- Points scored: For: 653; against: 632

Team information
- Chairman: Neil Hudgell
- Head coach: Justin Morgan
- Captain: Mick Vella
- Stadium: Craven Park
- Avg. attendance: 8,207

Top scorers
- Tries: Peter Fox (19)
- Goals: Michael Dobson (112)
- Points: Michael Dobson (275)
| ← 2009 | List of seasons | 2011 → |

In 2010, Hull Kingston Rovers, competing in their 128th season of rugby league, played in their fourth Super League season as well as in the 2010 Challenge Cup.

== Preseason friendlies ==
| Date and time | Versus | H/A | Venue | Result | Score | Tries | Goals | Attendance | Report |
|---|---|---|---|---|---|---|---|---|---|
| 16 January; 15:00 | York City Knights | A | Huntington Stadium | L | 6–28 | Hardcastle | Dee | 444 | |
| 17 January; 15:00 | Hull F.C. | A | KC Stadium | L | 16–28 | Colbon, Newton, I'anson | Dobson (2/3) | 16,204 | |
| 23 January, 15:00 | Doncaster R.L.F.C. | A | Keepmoat Stadium | L | 16–32 | | | 260 | |
| 24 January, 15:00 | Featherstone Rovers | A | Post Office Road | L | 24–32 | | | 3,570 | |
| 28 January, 20:00 | Bradford Bulls | H | Craven Park | L | 16–18 | Cooke, I'Anson, Welham | Dobson (2/3) | | |

== Super League ==
=== Fixtures ===
| Date and time | Versus | H/A | Venue | Result | Score | Tries | Goals | Attendance | Pos. | Report |
|---|---|---|---|---|---|---|---|---|---|---|
| 7 February, 15:00 | Salford City Reds | H | Craven Park | W | 30–12 | Fox (2), Webster, Dobson, Newton | Dobson (5/5) | 9,123 | 8th | |
| 12 February, 20:00 | Wigan Warriors | A | DW Stadium | L | 6–32 | Fisher | Dobson (1/1) | 12,429 | 8th | |
| 21 February, 15:00 | Huddersfield Giants | H | Craven Park | L | 0–30 | | | 7,575 | 9th | |
| 27 February, 18:15 | Castleford Tigers | A | PROBIZ Colliseum | W | 24–20 | Murrell, Dobson, Cockayne, Watts | Dobson (4/4) | 6,855 | 9th | |
| 7 March, 15:00 | St. Helens | H | Craven Park | W | 28–24 | Colbon (3), Galea, Fisher | Dobson (4/5) | 8,202 | 9th | |
| 12 March, 20:00 | Wakefield Trinity Wildcats | H | Craven Park | L | 18–31 | Colbon, Webster, Murrell | Dobson (3/3) | 8,004 | 9th | |
| 19 March, 20:00 | Leeds Rhinos | A | Headingley Carnegie Stadium | W | 17–10 | Colbon, Fox, Briscoe | Dobson (2/4); Drop-goals: Dobson | 15,201 | 7th | |
| 27 March, 19:30 (GMT) | Catalans Dragons | A | Stade Gilbert Brutus | L | 10–16 | Webster, Welham | Dobson (1/2) | 6,513 | 8th | |
| 2 April, 12:45 (Good Friday) | Hull F.C. | H | Craven Park | L | 10–16 | Cockayne, Welham | Dobson (2/2 + 1 pen.) | 10,089 | 8th | |
| 5 April, 14:00 | Harlequins RL | A | Twickenham Stoop | W | 52–12 | Welham (4), Galea (2), Cooke, Dobson, Lovegrove | Dobson (8/9) | 2,819 | 8th | |
| 11 April, 15:00 | Warrington Wolves | H | Craven Park | W | 36–16 | Fox (2), Welham, Cockayne, Briscoe, Cooke | Dobson (6/7) | 8,452 | 7th | |
| 25 April, 15:00 | Bradford Bulls | A | Grattan Stadium | L | 4–40 | Cockayne | Dobson (0/1) | 9,234 | 8th | |
| 2 May, 20:00 (Magic Weekend) | St Helens | N | Murrayfield Stadium | L | 0–54 | | | 25,401 | 9th | |
| 16 May, 15:00 | Crusaders RL | H | Craven Park | W | 54–10 | Dobson (3), Newton (2), Cockayne, Watts, Welham | Dobson (9/9) | 7,273 | 8th | |
| 21 May, 20:00 | St Helens | A | GPW Recruitment Stadium | L | 12–68 | Welham, Newton | Dobson (2/2) | 9,458 | 8th | |
| 6 June, 15:00 | Catalans Dragons | H | Craven Park | W | 24–6 | Galea, Welham, Murrell, Dobson | Dobson (4/4) | 7,102 | 8th | |
| 11 June, 20:00 | Warrington Wolves | A | Halliwell Jones Stadium | L | 16–35 | Welham, Ratu, Fisher | Dobson (2/3) | 9,216 | 8th | |
| 20 June, 15:00 | Harlequins RL | H | Craven Park | W | 42–6 | Newton (2), Dobson (2), Briscoe, Wheeldon, Clinton | Dobson (7/7) | 7,612 | 7th | |
| 25 June, 15:00 | Huddersfield Giants | A | Galpharm Stadium | D | 16–16 | Murrell, Newton | Dobson (2/2 + 2 pen.) | 6,304 | 7th | |
| 4 July, 15:30 | Wakefield Trinity Wildcats | A | Hearwell Stadium | W | 46–14 | Fox (2), Wheeldon (2), Dobson, Newton, Welham | Dobson (7/7 + 2 pen.) | 6,218 | 6th | |
| 9 July, 20:00 | Leeds Rhinos | H | Craven Park | W | 25–6 | Galea, Fisher, Fox, Cockayne | Dobson (4/4); Drop-goals: Dobson | 8,048 | 6th | |
| 15 July, 17:45 | Hull F.C. | A | KC Stadium | L | 16–20 | Charnley, Newton, Watts | Dobson (2/3) | 20,079 | 7th | |
| 24 July, 17:15 | Bradford Bulls | H | Craven Park | W | 49–24 | Fox (3), Newton (2), Briscoe (2), Latus, Clinton | Dobson (6/9); Drop-goals: Dobson | 7,854 | 7th | |
| 1 August, 15:00 | Castleford Tigers | H | Craven Park | W | 28–26 | Charnley (3), Briscoe | Dobson (4/4 + 2 pen.) | 8,104 | 7th | |
| 15 August, 15:00 | Salford City Reds | A | The Willows | W | 44–18 | Briscoe (2), Newton (2), Colbon, Charnley, Murrell, Dobson | Dobson (6/6) | 4,111 | 7th | |
| 22 August, 15:00 | Wigan Warriors | H | Craven Park | L | 18–38 | Murrell, Cooke, Lovegrove | Dobson (3/3) | 9,250 | 7th | |
| 4 September, 18:45 | Crusaders RL | A | Racecourse Ground | L | 24–30 | Fox, Briscoe, Welham, Galea | Dobson (4/4) | 5,137 | 7th | |

=== Table ===
| Pos | Team | Pld | W | D | L | PF | PA | PD | Pts | Qualification |
|---|---|---|---|---|---|---|---|---|---|---|
| 1 | Wigan Warriors (L, C) | 27 | 22 | 0 | 5 | 922 | 411 | +511 | 44 | Play-offs |
| 2 | St Helens | 27 | 20 | 0 | 7 | 946 | 547 | +399 | 40 | Play-offs |
| 3 | Warrington Wolves | 27 | 20 | 0 | 7 | 885 | 488 | +397 | 40 | Play-offs |
| 4 | Leeds Rhinos | 27 | 17 | 1 | 9 | 725 | 561 | +164 | 35 | Play-offs |
| 5 | Huddersfield Giants | 27 | 16 | 1 | 10 | 758 | 439 | +319 | 33 | Play-offs |
| 6 | Hull F.C. | 27 | 16 | 0 | 11 | 569 | 584 | −15 | 32 | Play-offs |
| 7 | Hull Kingston Rovers | 27 | 14 | 1 | 12 | 653 | 632 | +21 | 29 | Play-offs |
| 8 | Celtic Crusaders | 27 | 12 | 0 | 15 | 547 | 732 | −185 | 24 | Play-offs |
| 9 | Castleford Tigers | 27 | 11 | 0 | 16 | 648 | 766 | −118 | 22 | |
| 10 | Bradford Bulls | 27 | 9 | 1 | 17 | 528 | 728 | −200 | 19 | |
| 11 | Wakefield Trinity Wildcats | 27 | 9 | 0 | 18 | 539 | 741 | −202 | 18 | |
| 12 | Salford City Reds | 27 | 8 | 0 | 19 | 448 | 857 | −409 | 16 | |
| 13 | Harlequins | 27 | 7 | 0 | 20 | 494 | 838 | −344 | 14 | |
| 14 | Catalans Dragons | 27 | 6 | 0 | 21 | 409 | 747 | −338 | 12 | |

Source: Rugby League Project
Rules for classification: 1) Points; 2) Points difference; 3) Number of points scored;
(C) Champions; (L) League Leaders' Shield Winners

=== Play-offs ===
| Date and time | Round | Versus | H/A | Venue | Result | Score | Tries | Goals | Attendance | Report |
|---|---|---|---|---|---|---|---|---|---|---|
| 11 September; 18:00 | Qualifying/Elimination playoffs | Hull FC | A | KC Stadium | W | 21–4 | Fox, Fisher, Welham | Dobson (3/3 + 1 pen.); Drop-goals: Murrell | 17,669 | |
| 17 September, 20:00 | Preliminary semi-finals | Wigan Warriors | A | DW Stadium | L | 18–42 | Fox (2), Cockayne | Dobson (3/3) | 11,133 | |

== Challenge Cup ==
| Date and time | Round | Versus | H/A | Venue | Result | Score | Tries | Goals | Attendance | Report |
|---|---|---|---|---|---|---|---|---|---|---|
| 18 April; 13:45 | Round 4 | Huddersfield Giants | A | Galpharm Stadium | L | 12–40 | Webster, Briscoe | Dobson | 7,241 | |

== Transfers ==
=== Gains ===
| Player | Club | Contract | Date |
|---|---|---|---|
| (England) Matt Cook | Bradford Bulls | 2 Years | September 2009 |
| (England) Josh Hodgson | Hull F.C. | 2 Years | September 2009 |
| (Fiji) Michael Ratu | Leeds Rhinos | 2 Years | September 2009 |
| (Australia) Joel Clinton | Brisbane Broncos | 2 Years | February 2010 |

=== Losses ===
| Player | Club | Contract | Date |
|---|---|---|---|
| (England) Kyle Bibb | Wakefield Trinity Wildcats | End of loan | August 2009 |
| (England) Ryan Esders | Harlequins RL | 1 Year | September 2009 |
| (Papua New Guinea) Makali Aizue | Halifax | 2 Years | September 2009 |
| (England) Nick Fozzard | St Helens | | September 2009 |
| (Papua New Guinea) Stanley Gene | Halifax | 1 Year + 1 Year | October 2009 |
| (Australia) Daniel Fitzhenry | Wests Tigers | 1 Year | October 2009 |

=== Loans ===
| Player | Club | Contract | Date |
|---|---|---|---|
| (England) Josh Charnley | Wigan Warriors | 1 month loan | July 2010 |

== Squad ==
2010 Hull Kingston Rovers squad
| First team squad | | | Coaching staff |
|---|---|---|---|
| 1 (England) Shaun Briscoe – FB; 2 (England) Peter Fox – WG; 3 (England) Kris Welham – CE; 4 (New Zealand) Jake Webster – CE; 5 (England) Liam Colbon – WG; 6 (England) Paul Cooke – SO; 7 (Australia) Michael Dobson – SH; 8 (England) Scott Wheeldon – PR; 9 (Scotland) Ben Fisher – HK; 10 (Australia) Michael Vella (c) – PR; 11 (United States) Clint Newton – SR; 12 (Australia) Ben Galea – SR | 13 (England) Scott Murrell – LF, HK; 14 (England) Chev Walker – CE; 15 (England) Matt Cook – SR; 16 (England) Jason Netherton – SR; 17 (England) Josh Hodgson – HK; 18 (England) Ben Cockayne – FB; 19 (Australia) Rhys Lovegrove – PR; 21 (England) Chaz I'Anson – SH; 22 (Fiji) Michael Ratu – CE; 23 (England) Scott Taylor – SR; 24 (England) Liam Watts – FB, PR | 25 (England) Richard Beaumont – PR; 26 (Scotland) Frankie Mariano – WG; 27 (England) Scott Spaven – SR; 28 (England) Jack Latus – WG; 29 (England) Sam Latus – WG; 30 (Australia) Joel Clinton – PR | Head coach: (Australia) Justin Morgan; Assistant coach: (England) Chris Chester; Legend: (c) Captain(s); (vc) Vice-captain(s) |
