= 2009 Challenge Cup =

Rugby league competition

2009 Carnegie Challenge Cup
- Duration: 9 Rounds
- Highest attendance: 76,560
- Broadcast partners: (United Kingdom) BBC Sport
- Winners: Warrington Wolves
- Runners-up: Huddersfield
- Biggest home win: Featherstone Rovers 94–2; The Army
- Biggest away win: Batley Bulldogs 4–66; Salford City Reds
- Lance Todd Trophy: Michael Monaghan

The 2009 Challenge Cup (also known as the Carnegie Challenge Cup for sponsorship reasons) was the 108th staging of the most prestigious knock-out competition in rugby league. Teams from England, Scotland, Wales, France and Russia were included in the tournament. It began in January 2009.

Teams from the Co-operative Championship received byes into round three along with four teams from France, and the winner of the Russian Championship. Teams from the Super League enter in round four.

Defending champions St. Helens lost in the semi-final 14 – 24 to the Huddersfield Giants who went on to lose the final 16 – 25 to the Warrington Wolves.

For 2009, the early stages of the competition was revamped. As the competition has expanded, there was now a preliminary round before the first round, and teams were placed into two 'pools' for the preliminary, first and second rounds.

== Pools ==
Pool A features 48 teams, made up as follows:

- The 40 teams from the National Conference League
- The winners of the five major BARLA Regional Leagues
- The winners of the three major BARLA Regional Cup Competitions – Yorkshire, North West & Cumberland

Pool B features 16 teams, which is a mixed bag of Rugby League Conference teams (including representatives from Scotland and Wales), armed forces representative teams and University teams.

== Preliminary round ==
=== Pool A ===
All matches were due to be played on 3–4 January, however, winter weather forced the postponement of most of these fixtures due to frozen pitches. The round is divided into two pools, with several teams receiving a bye to the First Round:

Tie no	Home team	Score	Away team
1 ^{†}	Eccles and Salford Juniors	6–22	Saddleworth Rangers
2 ^{†}	Egremont Rangers	14–8	Thornhill Trojans
3 ^{†}	Ovenden	22–20	Oulton Raiders
4	Skirlaugh	56–4	Heworth
5 ^{†}	Wath Brow Hornets	18–14	Millom
6	Siddal	30–12	Normanton Knights
7 ^{†}	Stanningley	16–18	Hull Dockers
8 ^{†}	Halifax Irish	10–22	Bradford Dudley Hill
9 ^{†}	Rochdale Mayfield	12–36	Leigh East
10	Halton Simms Cross	46–12	York Acorn
11 ^{†}	Ellenborough	4–20	Wigan St Patricks
12 ^{†}	Bank Quay Bulls	6–19	Queens
13 ^{†}	Oldham St Annes	16–30	Wigan St Judes
14 ^{†}	Widnes St Maries	22–8	Ince Rose Bridge
15	Shaw Cross Sharks	16–21	Castleford Lock Lane
16	Stanley Rangers	12–40	Leigh Miners Rangers

†: fixtures rearranged due to frozen pitches. New dates varied between teams, depending on clashes with league fixtures and weather.

=== Pool B ===
Fixtures played 17–18 January:

Tie no	Home team	Score	Away team
1	Bristol Sonics	8–52	Leeds Met Carnegie
2	University of Wales Institute	18–20	Valley Cougars
3	Loughborough University	26–16	Nottingham Outlaws
4	West London Sharks	10–22	The Army

Pool A Byes: West Hull, Thatto Heath Crusaders, Myton Warriors, Orchard Park and Greenwood, Eastmoor Dragons, East Hull, Sharlston Rovers, Kells, Hull Isberg, East Leeds, Pilkington Recs, West Bowling, Milford Marlins, Crossfields, Waterhead, Castleford Panthers

Pool B Byes: St Mary's University College, RAF, Warrington Wizards, Featherstone Lions, Hull University, Edinburgh Eagles, Northumbria University, Royal Navy

== Round 1 ==
All matches played on 24–25 January. The round was divided into two pools, with the teams that received a bye in the last round entering.

=== Pool A ===
Tie no	Home team	Score	Away team
1	Kells	26–14	Eastmoor Dragons
2	West Hull	56–0	East Leeds
3	West Bowling	32–6	East Hull
4	Milford Marlins	14–24	Pilkington Recs
5 ^{†}	Hull Dockers	34–4	Ovenden
6 ^{†}	Castleford Panthers	12–26	Leigh Miners Rangers
7	Waterhead	14–16	Castleford Lock Lane
8 ^{†}	Siddal	36–12	Thatto Heath
9 ^{†}	Crosfields	10–36	Sharlston Rovers
10	Wigan St Patricks	24–18	Skirlaugh
11	Egremont Rangers	0–42	Wath Brow Hornets
12	Leigh East	68–0	Orchard Park and Greenwood
13	Hull Isberg	12–36	Saddleworth Rangers
14	Queens	13–0	Halton Simms Cross
15	Wigan St Judes	34–20	Myton Warriors
16	Bradford Dudley Hill	19–24	Widnes St Maries

†: fixtures rearranged for 31 January due to flooded pitches.

=== Pool B ===
Tie no	Home team	Score	Away team
1	Featherstone Lions	18–12	Hull University
2	RAF	16–18	Edinburgh Eagles
3	Loughborough University	40–12	St Mary's University College
4	Leeds Met Carnegie	36–6	Warrington Wizards
5	The Navy	38–28	Valley Cougars
6	The Army	72–0	Northumbria University

== Round 2 ==
Draw hosted by Wath Brow Hornets on 27 January, as the winners of the Cumbrian derby in the first round. Matches were played 14–15 February.

=== Pool A ===
Tie no	Home team	Score	Away team
1	Wigan St Patricks	20–16	West Hull
2	Widnes St Maries	8–15	Queens
3	Wath Brow Hornets	40–22	Hull Dockers
4	Kells	31–22	Leigh Miners Rangers
5	Wigan St Judes	24–28	Pilkington Recs
6	Siddal	34–10	West Bowling
7	Sharlston Rovers	20–10	Leigh East
8	Saddleworth	20–16	Castleford Lock Lane

=== Pool B ===
Tie no	Home team	Score	Away team
1	Loughborough University	20–18	The Navy
2	Leeds Met Carnegie	20–6	Edinburgh Eagles
3	Featherstone Lions	12–30	The Army

== Round 3 ==
Draw was made live on BBC Radio Manchester on 17 February. All twenty Co-operative Championship teams were added into the competition in this round, as well as four teams from the French Elite One Championship, and winners of the 2008 Russian Championship, RC Lokomotiv Moscow. The matches were played on 7–8 March.

Tie no	Home team	Score	Away team
1	Siddal	6–10	Swinton Lions
2	York City Knights	50–10	Wigan St Patricks
3	Featherstone Rovers	94–2	The Army
4^{1}	Queens	A–A	Doncaster
5	Pilkington Recs	24–34	Batley Bulldogs
6	Barrow Raiders	44–12	Blackpool Panthers
7	Gateshead Thunder	42–38	Whitehaven
8	Workington Town	6–18	Lézignan Sangliers
9	Leigh Centurions	82–6	RC Lokomotiv Moscow
10	Oldham R.L.F.C.	26–8	Sharlston
11	Sheffield Eagles	22–6	Toulouse Olympique
12	Leeds Met Carnegie	24–38	Rochdale Hornets
13	Widnes Vikings	88–0	Saddleworth
14	Wath Brow Hornets	14–12	London Skolars
15	Keighley Cougars	30–24	Pia Donkeys
16^{2}	Kells	12–22	Hunslet Hawks
17	Halifax	80–16	Loughborough University
18	Dewsbury Rams	18–6	AS Carcassonne

- ^{1}: Match was abandoned on 61st minute due to crowd trouble. Doncaster went through due to them being ahead at the time. The RFL upheld the decision after an investigation. It was the first time a rugby league game has been abandoned in England due to crowd trouble in over 70 years.
- ^{2}: Match postponed due to waterlogged pitch.

== Round 4 ==
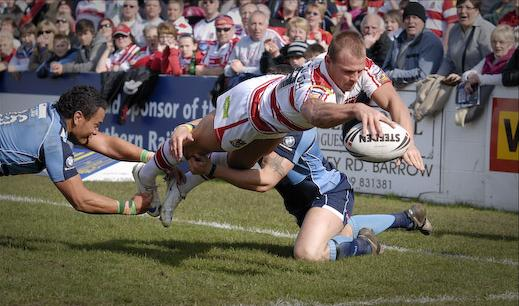
Shaun Ainscough try for Wigan Warriors during their match against Barrow Raiders

The draw for round 4 was made live on 9 March on BBC Radio 5 Live. The sixteen victorious Co-operative Championship teams from round 3 were joined by all fourteen Super League XIV teams, as well as Wath Brow Hornets, the competition's only amateur club remaining at this stage, and Lezignan, making this the Round of 32. From this point, no more teams were added to the competition.

All ties were played 3–5 April.

Home	Score	Away	Match information
Home	Score	Away	Date and time	Venue	Referee	Attendance
Swinton Lions	22–28	Rochdale Hornets	3 April, 19:30 BST	Park Lane	Peter Brooke	525
Halifax	20–16	Widnes Vikings	3 April, 20:00 BST	Shay Stadium	Richard Silverwood	3,204
Hull Kingston Rovers	32–6	Crusaders	3 April, 20:00 BST	New Craven Park	Thierry Alibert	7,104
Sheffield Eagles	28–18	Dewsbury Rams	3 April, 20:00 BST	Don Valley Stadium	Robert Hicks	597
Wakefield Trinity Wildcats	54–0	Leigh Centurions	3 April, 20:00 BST	Belle Vue	Gareth Hewer	2,637
Warrington Wolves	56–10	York City Knights	4 April, 14:00 BST	Halliwell Jones Stadium	James Child	6,000
Harlequins	16–42	Huddersfield Giants	4 April, 15:00 BST	The Twickenham Stoop	Ben Thaler	2,500
Batley Bulldogs	28–24	Hunslet Hawks	5 April, 14:00 BST	Mount Pleasant	Dave Merrick	633
Featherstone Rovers	54–16	Wath Brow Hornets	5 April, 14:00 BST	Chris Moyles Stadium	Greg Dolan	1,180
Oldham R.L.F.C.	60–30	Lézignan Sangliers	5 April, 14:00 BST	Boundary Park	Ronnie Laughton	863
Catalans Dragons	40–38	Bradford Bulls	5 April, 14:30 BST	Stade Gilbert Brutus	Steve Ganson	6,450
Barrow Raiders	20–32	Wigan Warriors	5 April, 15:00 BST	Craven Park	Jamie Leahy	6,275
Doncaster	18–32	Gateshead Thunder	5 April, 15:00 BST	Keepmoat Stadium	Craig Halloran	458
Keighley Cougars	20–64	Castleford Tigers	5 April, 15:00 BST	Cougar Park	Matthew Thomason	3,255
Hull F.C.	18–22	Salford City Reds	5 April, 15:15 BST	KC Stadium	Ian Smith	8,945
Leeds Rhinos	18–22	St. Helens	5 April, 16:30 BST	Headingley Stadium	Phil Bentham	17,689

Average attendance: 4,270

== Round 5 ==
The sixteen teams remaining after Round 4 were randomly paired against each other, in a draw held at RAF Leeming on 7 April involving AVM Chris Davison, Director of the RAF Sports Board, and Barrie McDermott, former Leeds and Great Britain and Ireland player.

All matches were played on 9–10 May. The match between Gateshead Thunder and Oldham R.L.F.C. was due to be played at the Gateshead International Stadium, since Gateshead were the home team, however the match was rearranged to be played at the Darlington Arena due to a fixture clash between a playoff match for Gateshead F.C., who share the stadium with the rugby league side, and an athletics meeting. This was the first ever professional rugby league match to be held inside County Durham.

The first match of this round was a repeat of a Super League fixture only thirteen days earlier. Wakefield Trinity took the initial lead, scoring ten points in six minutes, before Wigan levelled the game by the 24th minute. An early drop goal by Danny Brough edged Wakefield ahead by one point before Wigan scored their third try to lead 11–16 going into half time, following a successful conversion by Pat Richards. Wakefield scored their only try of the second half after 51 minutes, before Wigan scored two more tries to win the game by a margin of eleven points.

Oldham also started off taking the initial lead before losing to the Gateshead Thunder. Tommy Goulden gave the visitors a lead of six points following a successful conversion, and this gave them a 4–6 lead at half time following a Gateshead try which was unsuccessfully converted. Four tries and three goals from Gateshead after the break handed them a twenty-two-point lead, and two tries and a goal from Oldham were not enough to restore the deficit. A final Gateshead try ended the game with a firm 18-point margin in favour of Gateshead.

The first game ever to be concluded via the golden point rule was played at The Jungle. Halifax earned a ten-point lead through a try and two goals, one of which a penalty. Castleford replied with a converted try, before Halifax kicked another penalty goal to lead 6–12. The home side again scored a try, which was converted, before Halifax kicked another penalty goal before half time. Halifax scored first with a try after the break, before Castleford scored another of their own. Another try for Halifax was countered with three Castleford tries, one of which was successfully converted to give them a 30–22 lead. Two converted Halifax tries put them into the lead by four points with ten minutes to play, but a try from Brent Sherwin on the 74th minute levelled the game at full-time. Sherwin also scored the drop goal three minutes into extra time to send Castleford through after an historic fixture.

Huddersfield won their early morning kick-off against Rochdale Hornets despite two late tries from the away side. Luke Robinson opened up the scoring on six minutes to score the first of five first-half tries for Huddersfield, to which Rochdale had no reply. Huddersfield scored again after 44 minutes to put themselves 32 points to nil ahead, before two converted Rochdale tries lowered the deficit to twenty points. Shaun Lunt finished the game off five minutes from full-time with a try that was successfully converted to provide himself with a hat-trick, and to give Huddersfield a comfortable win.

Like Oldham and Wakefield had done the day before, Featherstone Rovers took the initiative before losing to the opposition. Featherstone took a four-point lead thanks to a try which was unsuccessfully converted before Warrington scored twenty unanswered first-half points with four tries and two conversions. Chris Hicks converted his own try shortly after the break to put Warrington 4–26 into the lead before Featherstone replied with what was to be their final try. Warrington proceeded to run in five tries before full-time, all of which were converted by Hicks, to win the game by almost a half-century of points.

Salford City Reds had lost three of their previous matches prior to this round's fixture, but this did not stop eight Salford City Reds players touching down for tries as they delivered the widest winning margin of the round away to Batley. Eight tries and eight goals, seven of which made up John Wilshere's ten goal match tally, scored by Salford City Reds went unanswered as Batley went into half-time fighting a 48-point deficit. Two further converted tries from Salford City Reds, including Mark Henry's fourth try, came before Batley's only try of the afternoon, which was not converted. Luke Adamson touched down two minutes from full-time to give a winning margin of 62 in favour of Salford City Reds.

Of the four Co-operative Championship sides facing Super League opposition on the Sunday, Sheffield Eagles came closest to winning, with Hull Kingston Rovers having to regalvanise themselves to prevent a Sheffield come-from-behind victory. The Sheffield Eagles only scored one converted try in the first forty minutes compared to the Hull Kingston Rovers' four tries and three goals which had given them a sixteen-point advantage going into half time, but Sheffield struck back quickly after the break with a converted try in the 41st minute. Sheffield scored again fifteen minutes later with a converted try to put them only four points behind, before Shaun Briscoe went over the try-line and Michael Dobson converted to restore a ten-point advantage. Sheffield scored another try to lower the gap to four points again, but a late Rovers try in the 77th minute ended the game to advance them through to the quarterfinals instead of Sheffield.

In a repeat of the 2007 Challenge Cup Final, St. Helens overcame French opposition in the outfit of the Catalans Dragons to reach the quarterfinals and maintain their four-year unbeaten cup run. Two tries within ten minutes gave an eight-point advantage to the home side before Thomas Bosc kicked a penalty to reduce the lead to 8–2. Catalans scored a converted try in the 21st minute to level game, before two tries and a goal for St Helens meant an 18–8 half time scoreline. Catalans failed to score at all in the second half, whilst to the contrary, St Helens ran in four tries, two of which were scored by Paul Wellens. All of the second half tries were converted by Sean Long to give the home side a winning margin of 34 points.

Home	Score	Away	Match information
Home	Score	Away	Date and time	Venue	Referee	Attendance
Wakefield Trinity Wildcats	17–28	Wigan Warriors	9 May, 14:30 BST	Belle Vue	Phil Bentham	4,883
Gateshead Thunder	34–16	Oldham R.L.F.C.	9 May, 15:00 BST	The Darlington Arena	James Child	929
Castleford Tigers	35–34	Halifax	9 May, 18:00 BST	The Jungle	Steve Ganson	5,595
Castleford win in extra time via the golden point rule.
Huddersfield Giants	38–12	Rochdale Hornets	10 May, 11:30 BST	Galpharm Stadium	Gareth Hewer	2,859
Featherstone Rovers	8–56	Warrington Wolves	10 May, 13:30 BST	Chris Moyles Stadium	Ian Smith	3,127
Batley Bulldogs	4–66	Salford City Reds	10 May, 15:00 BST	Mount Pleasant	Jamie Leahy	1,298
Hull Kingston Rovers	34–24	Sheffield Eagles	10 May, 15:00 BST	New Craven Park	Thierry Alibert	4,955
St. Helens	42–8	Catalans Dragons	10 May, 15:15 BST	GPW Recruitment Stadium	Ben Thaler	7,176

Average attendance: 3,853

== Quarter finals ==
The sixth round of the Challenge Cup involves the eight teams who won their respective matches in the previous round. This is the final round where home field advantage is given, due to the requirement that all semi-final matches must be played at a neutral venue.

The draw was made live on BBC Two at the GPW Recruitment Stadium on 10 May. Chris Joynt, four times winner of the Challenge Cup with St. Helens drew the home sides, while Andy Farrell OBE, four times winner with the Wigan Warriors, drew the away sides.

The matches were played on 29–31 May, during the hottest weekend of the year so far temperature-wise.

A sunny Friday evening at the JJB Stadium provided host to the round's first match, between the Wigan Warriors and Salford City Reds. Salford City Redswere victorious in their last three games going into this match, with Wigan hoping to get back to winning ways after a defeat to Warrington at the Halliwell Jones Stadium. Both players were also missing a player, Wigan's Stuart Fielden for disciplinary reasons, and Darrell Goulding for Salford City Reds, on loan from Wigan, who was cup-tied for playing against Barrow Raiders earlier on in the competition. A line break from Gareth Hock gave the home side a six-point lead after two minutes, following a successful conversion from Pat Richards. Salford City Reds replied nine minutes later with a line break of their own, eventually resulting in a try for Luke Adamson, converted by John Wilshere. It was to be the only Salford City Reds score of the match, but Wigan failed to take full control after forty minutes in only scoring one further try from Pat Richards on the wing to make the score 10–6 on the half-time hooter. However, Wigan scored eighteen unanswered points in the second half, with Pat Richards kicking a goal on the 49th minute, and scoring two more tries on the 59th and 70th minute to complete his hat-trick, the latter of which was converted. Hock scored another try of his own after 76 minutes, with Richards kicking the conversion to bring his individual total for the match to twenty, booking Wigan's place in the semi-finals for the first time since 2007.

A Lee Briers drop goal in extra-time was all that separated Hull Kingston Rovers and Warrington Wolves at "New" Craven Park on the Saturday in a closely fought game. Both sides were in winning form, with Warrington Wolves having assembled three wins in a row, and Hull Hull Kingston Rovers having won their previous six matches. The two sides had recent history in the competition, when in 2006, Warrington Wolves were knocked-out by Hull Kingston Rovers, who were then in National League One. The home side were first on the scoresheet after centre Kris Welham crossed the line in the 3rd minute. The conversion attempt was successful from Michael Dobson, before Vinnie Anderson replied for Warrington Wolves on the 17th minute to put the scores level following a Briers conversion. In spite of attacking play from both sides, the game ended at half time 6–6. Warrington Wolves seized the initiative four minutes after the break thanks to a converted Jon Clarke try, however, Hull Kingston Rovers levelled the game again five minutes later when Clint Newton crossed over the tryline. The home side pressed a ten-point advantage with two 53rd and 60th minute tries from Ben Galea and Jake Webster respectively, the latter of which was the only unsuccessful conversion of the match. Warrington Wolves matched Hull Kingston Rovers with two tries of their own in five minutes from Matt King and Chris Bridge, to put them two points ahead with ten minutes left to play. A penalty conceded to the side of Warrington Wolves 's left upright was kicked by Hull Kingston Rovers's Dobson three minutes from full-time to force the game into a golden point situation, the score being 24–24 at the final hooter. Hull Kingston Rovers did not gain enough territory to allow Dobson a chance at a drop goal, whilst conversely Briers missed three attempts, once to the right side facing him and twice to the left side of the uprights, before landing his fourth attempt five minutes into extra time.

In contrast, the match at the Gateshead International Stadium could barely have been more one-sided, with St. Helens running out eventual winners against the Gateshead Thunder. St Helens scored twice in the first five minutes, with tries from Matthew Gidley and James Roby, both conversions missed. A brief lull in the game was ended with another St Helens try after 21 minutes from fullback Paul Wellens, and this was converted by Sean Long. Chris Flannery scored in the 25th minute, before a barrage of three St Helens tries in five minutes from Maurie Fa'asavalu, Kyle Eastmond and Leon Pryce respectively put the visitors 0–36 ahead following three conversions from Eastmond. Gateshead scored their solitary try before half-time when Ben McAlpine scored, and Nick Youngquest converted. The second half saw thirty unanswered points from St Helens with five tries in the 51st, 54th, 57th, 64th and 72nd minutes, all of which were successively converted by Eastmond to continue St Helens' four-year unbeaten cup run, finish the score at 6–66, and end any chance of a Co-operative Championship team reaching Wembley this year.

The local derby between Huddersfield and Castleford was the solitary game on the Sunday, due to BBC coverage. Huddersfield were fresh from a 48-point winning margin over Wakefield Trinity from the Super League round the week before, whilst Castleford had not won a match during regular time in four games. Despite the form book, it was Castleford who gained the early advantage thanks to an aerial take from Michael Shenton following Rangi Chase's kick, before crashing over the tryline on the way back down to give Castleford a 0–4 lead after three minutes. Several passages later, Kevin Brown dummied his way for a try in front of the uprights which was successfully converted by Brett Hodgson. Huddersfield had a disallowed try before Castleford kicked a penalty two minutes before half-time to make a 6–6 scoreline at the break. Huddersfield again had a try disallowed for a forward pass, before Brett Ferres scored his only try, and two Kirk Dixon goals gave the visitors a 6–14 lead after fifty minutes. Huddersfield did not concede again, and following a twenty-minute lull, scored a try thanks to Stephen Wild, which was successfully converted. Determined Castleford defending kept Huddersfield out for nine further minutes, before Danny Kirmond scored the match winning try in the 77th minute to send Huddersfield through to the semi-final stage.

Home	Score	Away	Match information
Home	Score	Away	Date and time	Venue	Referee	Attendance
Wigan Warriors	28–6	Salford City Reds	29 May, 20:00 BST	JJB Stadium	Thierry Alibert	9,466
Hull Kingston Rovers	24–25	Warrington Wolves	30 May, 17:30 BST	New Craven Park	Phil Bentham	7,671
Warrington win by golden point in extra time after the game was tied 24–24 after 80 minutes.
Gateshead Thunder	6–66	St. Helens	30 May, 18:00 BST	The 'Thunderdome'	Ian Smith	4,325
Huddersfield Giants	16–14	Castleford Tigers	31 May, 15:30 BST	Galpharm Stadium	Richard Silverwood	6,359

Average attendance: 6,955

== Semi finals ==
The four teams remaining play against each other for straight access into the Final. All matches in this round are played on a neutral venue. The draw was made live on BBC Two following coverage of the quarterfinal match between Huddersfield Giants and Castleford Tigers on 31 May. Only nine days after losing their Super League XIV tie at the Halliwell Jones Stadium, Wigan Warriors were drawn against the Warrington Wolves, whilst a repeat of the 2006 Challenge Cup Final was made with St. Helens versus Huddersfield Giants.

One match is played on Saturday 8 August, the other is played the day after. The dates and venues were confirmed on 2 June, with Wigan Warriors vs Warrington Wolves being played in Widnes at the Stobart Stadium Halton on the Saturday, and St Helens vs Huddersfield being played on the Sunday at the Halliwell Jones Stadium in Warrington.

=== Wigan vs Warrington ===
8 August 2009	Wigan Warriors	26–39	Warrington Wolves	Widnes, England
14:30 BST	Tries: Bailey 8'; S. Tomkins 53'; Coley 60'; Leuluai 68'; Goals: Richards 8', 12', 53', 60', 68'	[(Report) Report]	Tries: King 18', 38', 48'; L. Anderson 20'; Briers 22'; Cooper 29'; Chris Hicks 74'; Goals: Bridge 18', 20', 22', 29', 74'; Drop goals: Briers 70'	Stadium: Stobart Stadium Halton; Attendance: 12,975; Referee: Steve Ganson; Player of the Match: Lee Briers

A Matt King hat-trick ended Wigan's dreams of going to Wembley in 2009, putting Warrington into their first Challenge Cup final since 1990, despite the return of Wigan's captain Sean O'Loughlin following a knee injury. The video referee declined a Warrington try from Ben Westwood on grounds of obstruction, and Wigan also had a disallowed try from winger Pat Richards, but it was Wigan who took the initiative thanks to a side-step from Phil Bailey after seven minutes; the try was successfully converted by Richards. Two further points were added to Wigan's tally following a penalty, to give an 8–0 lead. Warrington rallied to score twenty-four unanswered points by the half-time break, with two tries from King as well as tries from Louis Anderson, Lee Briers and Michael Cooper, before King completed his hat-trick in the 48th minute to give the Wolves a 24-point lead. Sam Tomkins, in his first season of first-team rugby, started a Wigan fightback as he caught an offload from the right wing by George Carmont before grounding the ball beneath the sticks. Chris Riley was stretchered off for concussion and whiplash after colliding with Joel Tomkins' knee, and Wigan took advantage of this with two further tries from Andy Coley and Thomas Leuluai which were both converted to reduce Wigan's arrears to six points. Briers kicked a drop goal the set afterwards to give Warrington safety, before the game was sealed with a Chris Hicks try to give the full-time score of 26–39.

=== St Helens vs Huddersfield ===
9 August 2009	St Helens	14–24	Huddersfield Giants	Warrington, England
16:00 BST	Tries: Meli 10', 51', 78'; Goals: Eastmond 51'	[(Report) Report]	Tries: B. Hodgson 5'; Wild 32', 77'; Cudjoe 41'; Brown 47'; Goals: B. Hodgson 32', 77'	Stadium: Halliwell Jones Stadium; Attendance: 10,638; Referee: Richard Silverwood; Player of the Match: Brett Hodgson

A Francis Meli hat-trick was not enough to extend St Helens' four-year unbeaten run in the Challenge Cup with a victory in Warrington. Man of the match Brett Hodgson opened up the points tally with a try in the fifth minute, although he failed to convert it. Meli scored on the wing five minutes later to level the game following another missed conversion from Kyle Eastmond. Stephen Wild scored the only other try of the first-half following a line break from Kevin Brown, which was converted to give Huddersfield a 4–10 lead. Huddersfield extended the advantage further, scoring two tries from Leroy Cudjoe and Brown in the first ten minutes of the second half, although Brett Hodgson again missed both. Meli cross the line again on the wing to bring the score to 10–18. A strong defensive performance from Huddersfield prevented another St Helens score, and Wild's second try three minutes from full-time gave the Giants a 14-point advantage. St Helens' solitary try-scorer Meli scored on the wing straight from the kick-off to complete his hat-trick, but there was not enough time for a comeback.

== Final ==
The Carnegie 2009 Challenge Cup Final was played on 29 August, eight rounds and almost eight months after the tournament started in its preliminary stages. Following tradition, the match was held in London at Wembley Stadium. The game finished with Warrington Wolves defeating the Huddersfield Giants 16–25 following two controversial disallowed tries for the Giants, which if awarded would have won them the game if at least one conversion attempt was good.

29 August

Huddersfield Giants	16–25	Warrington Wolves

Wembley Stadium
Attendance: 76,560
Referee: Steve Ganson

== Television coverage ==
Selected matches were televised solely by the BBC in the United Kingdom.

Round	Live match	Date	BBC channel
Round 4	Catalans Dragons 40 – 38 Bradford Bulls; Leeds Rhinos 18 – 22 St. Helens	5 April	BBC Two^{1}
Round 5	Wakefield Trinity Wildcats 17 – 28 Wigan Warriors; St. Helens 42 – 8 Catalans Dragons	9 May; 10 May	BBC One; BBC Two^{1}
Quarter-finals	Hull Kingston Rovers 24 – 25 Warrington Wolves; Huddersfield Giants 16 – 14 Castleford Tigers^{2}	30 May; 31 May	BBC Two^{1}
Semi-finals	Wigan Warriors 26 – 39 Warrington Wolves; St. Helens 14 – 24 Huddersfield Giants	8 August 2009; 9 August 2009	BBC One; BBC Two^{1}
Final	Huddersfield Giants 16 – 25 Warrington Wolves	29 August	BBC One

^{1} Except Yorkshire.

^{2} Coverage in Northern Ireland (including analogue) was televised an hour later.

The competition was also televised by Nine Network in Australia.
