= St Peter's Catholic High School =

Comprehensive school in Greater Manchester, England

St. Peter's Catholic High School
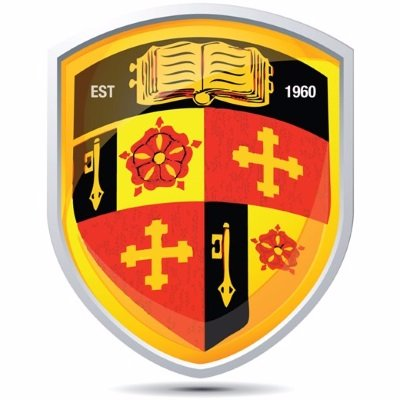

Location
- Howards Lane; Orrell, Metropolitan Borough of Wigan, Greater Manchester, WN5 8NU; England; 53.541197°N 2.700523°W

Information
- Type: Voluntary aided comprehensive
- Motto: Mission Statement: "A learning and serving community enriched through friendship and Christian faith"
- Established: 1960
- Local authority: Wigan
- Department for Education URN: 106537 Tables
- Ofsted: Reports
- Head teacher: Andy McGlown
- Age: 11 to 16
- Enrolment: 1040 pupils
- Website: Official website

St. Peter's Catholic High School is located in the Orrell area of Wigan, Greater Manchester. It caters for students from the ages of 11 to 16. Formed in 1960, it is one of the few Catholic comprehensive schools in the Wigan area.

St. Peter's has three main buildings: Main Build, the New Build and the Sports hall.

== Alumni ==
- Liam Colbon (b. 1984) - professional rugby league footballer, Wigan Warriors, Hull Kingston Rovers
- Con O'Neill (actor) - actor
