= Clint Newton =

American rugby league footballer

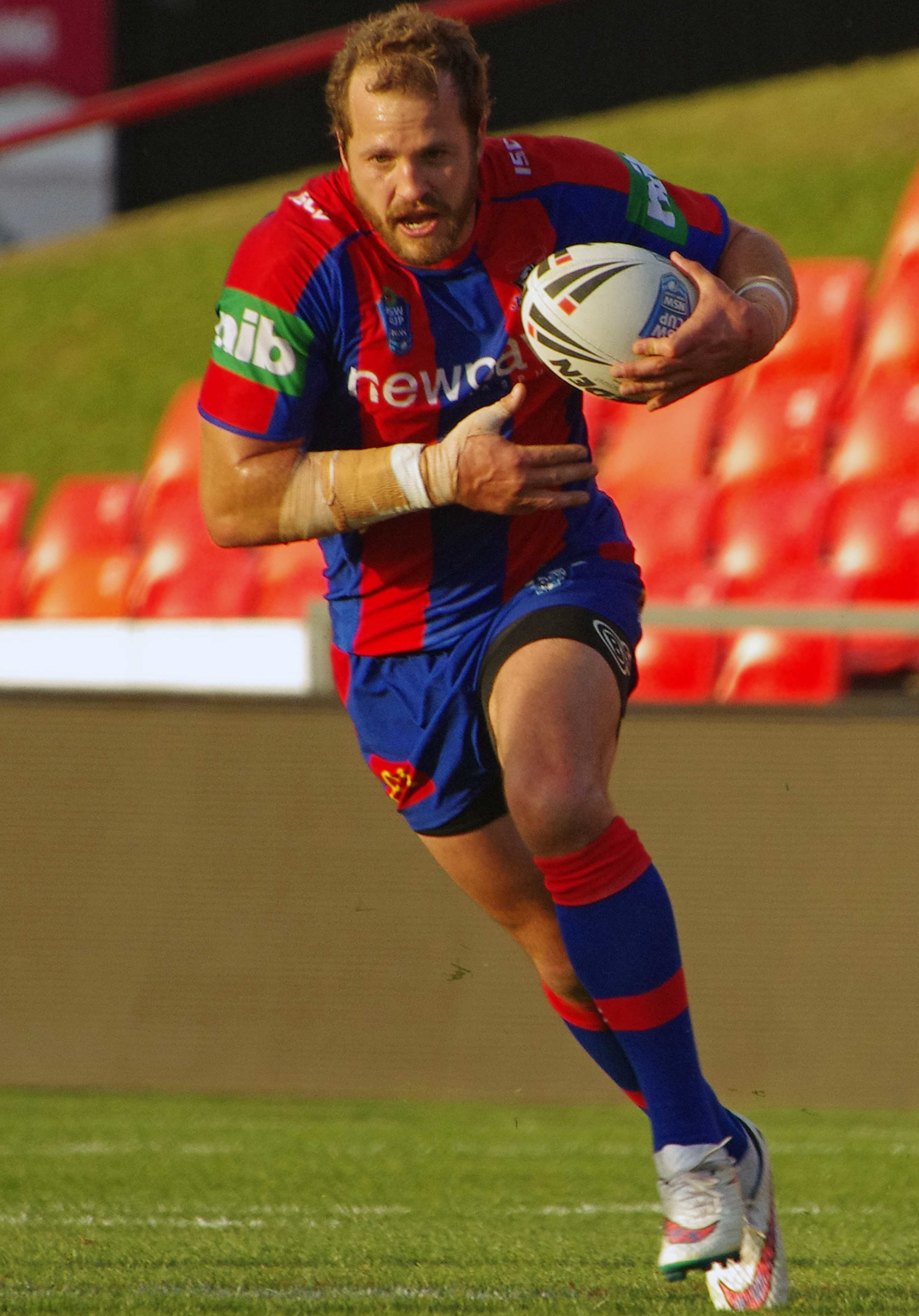

Personal information
- Born: 18 June 1981 (age 45) Myrtle Beach, South Carolina, US

Playing information
- Height: 186 cm (6 ft 1 in)
- Weight: 99 kg (15 st 8 lb)
- Position: Second-row, Lock
Club
Years	Team	Pld	T	G	FG	P
2001–07	Newcastle Knights	100	12	0	0	48
2007	Melbourne Storm	15	4	0	0	16
2008–11	Hull Kingston Rovers	100	40	0	0	160
2012–13	Penrith Panthers	46	6	1	0	26
2014–15	Newcastle Knights	12	1	0	0	4
	Total	273	63	1	0	254
Representative
Years	Team	Pld	T	G	FG	P
2005	Prime Minister's XIII	1	0	0	0	0
2007	NSW Country	1	0	0	0	0
2013	United States	4	2	0	0	8
- Father: Jack Newton

Clint Newton (born 18 June 1981) is an American-born Australian and former international rugby league footballer who played as a second-row and lock. He played for the Newcastle Knights, Melbourne Storm and Penrith Panthers in the NRL, Hull Kingston Rovers in the Super League, New South Wales Country and the United States at representative level as well as also having a stint in rugby union for Avoca Beach Rugby Club on the Central Coast, NSW.

Newton represented the United States in their 2013 Rugby League World Cup campaign.

== Early years ==
Clint Newton is the son of Jackie and professional golfer Jack Newton and the brother of professional golfer Kristie Newton. He was born in Myrtle Beach, South Carolina.

The Newtons moved back to Jack's native Newcastle, New South Wales where Clint began playing rugby league with the Valentine-Eleebana junior rugby league club.

During his junior years, Clint was coached by former Newcastle Knights captain Sam Stewart.

== Newcastle Knights ==
Newton made his first-grade début coming off the bench in the Newcastle Knights 45–24 victory over the New Zealand Warriors in Round 7 of the 2001 NRL season. Newton was not involved in Newcastle's Grand Final win that season, with his seventh and final appearance of the season coming in the Round 23 loss to Wests Tigers where he suffered a season-ending shoulder injury.

After recovering from his shoulder injury, he gained selection in the Knights first team for the 2002 World Club Challenge against the Bradford Bulls. Newton was then selected for Newcastle's 38–12 Round 1 victory against Northern Eagles, scoring his first try in the game. Newton went on to appear regularly for Newcastle during the 2002 season, making 25 appearances, mainly from the bench, and scoring 4 tries. However, it wasn't until Round 7 of the 2004 season that Newton held down a regular first team starting role after suffering two severe ankle injuries in 2003.

In 2006 he was selected to play Country Origin, but was ruled out with injury and replaced by the man he struck in the elbow late in the 2004 season, Ashton Sims (see below). Sims himself was also ruled out and replaced by then-Wests Tigers backrower Anthony Laffranchi.

=== Ashton Sims incident ===
During the 2004 season, Newton was sent off in the Round 24 match against St George Illawarra Dragons. Newton received a 12-week suspension for elbowing St George Illawarra Dragons forward Ashton Sims. The suspension cost Newton the chance to represent the United States in an international match against Australia later that year.

Newton had been sin-binned four weeks earlier against the Cowboys for a professional foul.

=== Departure ===
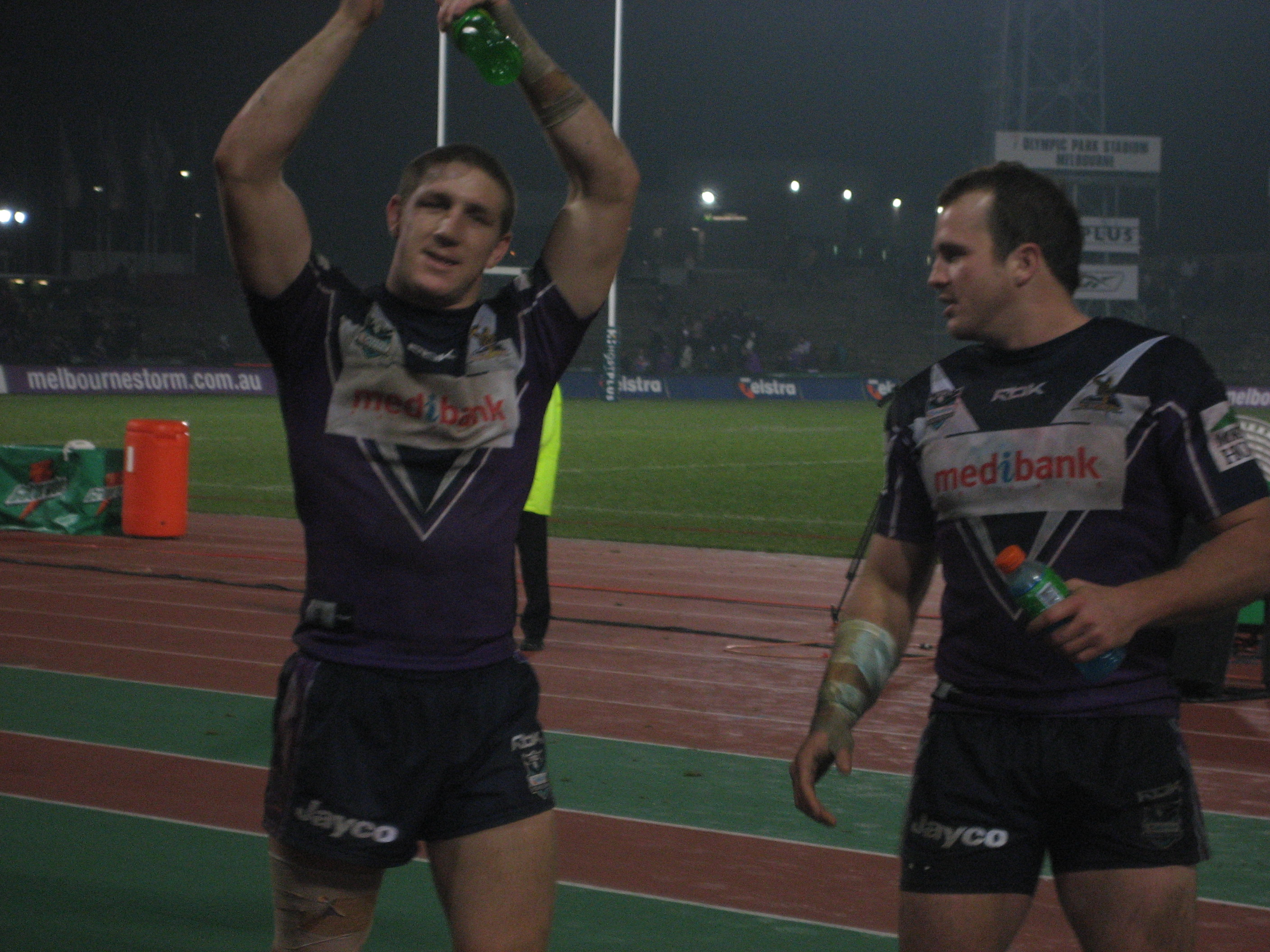
Ryan Hoffman and Newton in 2007 celebrating after a win for Melbourne

On 27 May 2007, Newton started in the Newcastle Knights 71–6 defeat by Brisbane Broncos in what turned out to be his last game for the club. The next day, Newton announced he was leaving the Newcastle Knights after just 100 games, due to "personal reasons" and after learning coach, Brian Smith no longer saw him as a "must keep" for the remainder of the 2007 season or beyond.

== Melbourne Storm ==
On 29 May 2007, Newton signed with the Melbourne Storm. He started in the second row in the Storm's round 13 clash with the New Zealand Warriors in Auckland and was one of the best players on the field, playing the full 80 minutes.

He went on to play and score in the Grand Final, a 34–8 victory over Manly, becoming the second player to transfer mid-year to a Grand Final winning club and made history by being the first player to transfer mid-year and score a try in his winning grand final. In all Newton played 15 matches for Melbourne, ending up on the losing side only once, a Round 20 defeat by the Sydney Roosters. He had the same birthdays as fellow Storm players Billy Slater and Cameron Smith but was two years older than both players. In 2010, the premiership that Newton won with Melbourne in 2007 was stripped by the NRL for major breaches of the salary cap alongside the 2009 premiership.

== Hull KR ==
On 17 October 2007, he was released by the Melbourne Storm due to salary cap restrictions and announced his move to the Super League on a two-year contract at Hull Kingston Rovers.

=== 2008 ===
Newton made his Hull KR début in the opening match of the 2008 season, a narrow 20–12 away defeat by reigning champions Leeds Rhinos. Newton went on to score his first try for the club in only his second match, a thrilling 24–22 home victory against St. Helens.

=== 2009 ===
Newton has been a star performer during the 2009 season, including scoring two hat tricks against Crusaders and Warrington Wolves. During the season Newton has, on occasions, been used as a starting prop forward before reverting to his familiar second row role later in the match. He has scored 12 Super League tries and 3 challenge cup tries in the 2009 season, his excellent form earning him a spot in the 2009 Super League Dream Team alongside teammates Ben Galea, Michael Dobson and Shaun Briscoe. Newton signed a four-year contract to take him through to the end of 2013 with Hull KR.

=== 2010 ===
Following on from the successful 2009 campaign, Newton continued his string of impressive performances in the opening round victory over Salford City Reds, scoring a try in the 30–12 victory.

== Penrith Panthers ==
Newton signed a two-year deal with the Penrith Panthers from 2012 having been brought in by Phil Gould to help rebuild the club, mentor younger players and use his experience to lead by example. Newton played a total of 46 first-grade games out of a possible 48 during his time at Penrith.

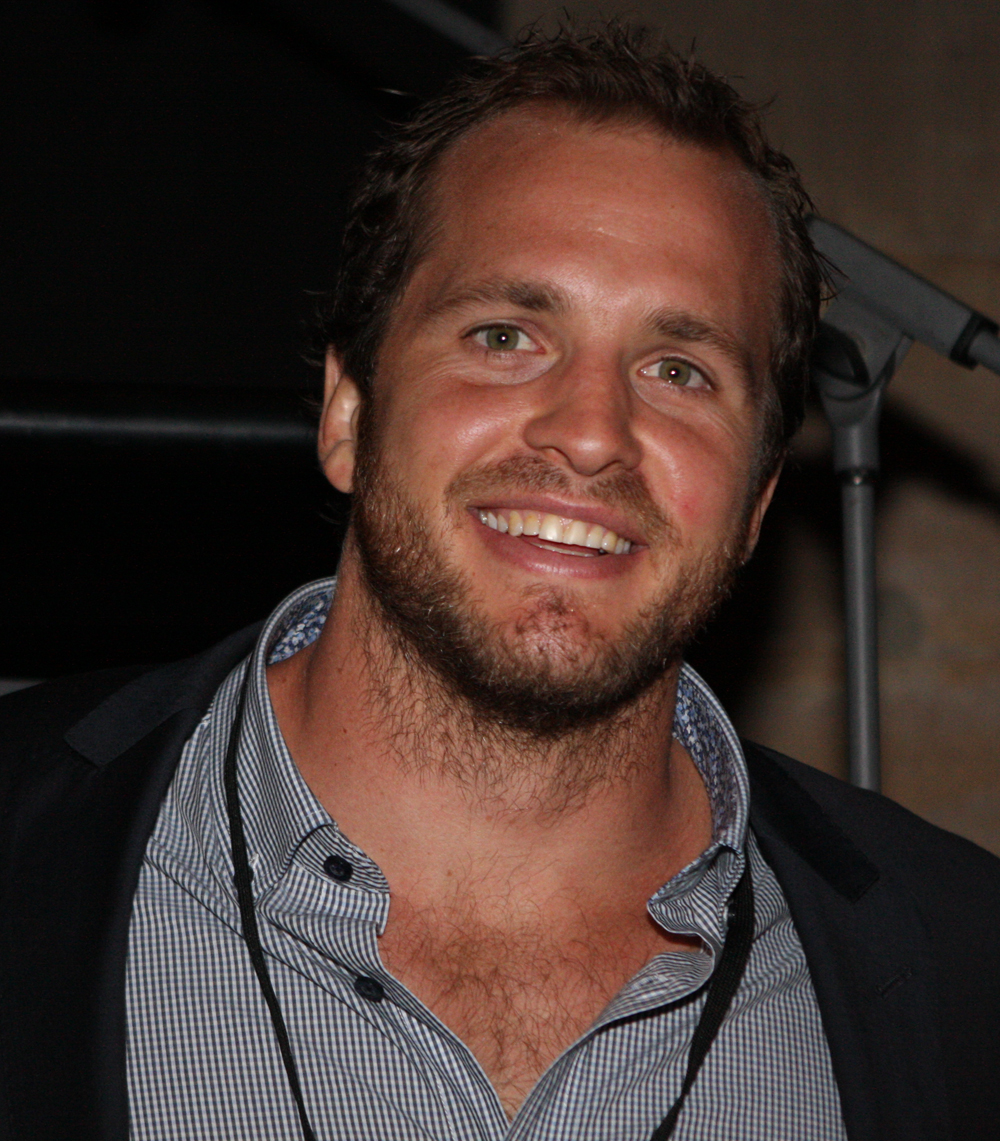
Newton in 2013

== Return to Newcastle Knights ==
On 6 September 2013, Newton signed a 1-year contract to return to the Newcastle Knights.

On 21 July 2015, Newton announced his retirement from rugby league at the end of the year, after spending his two last years back at the Knights mentoring younger players in New South Wales Cup. On 27 September 2015, he captained the Knights in their 2015 New South Wales Cup Grand Final win over the Wyong Roos.

== Post-rugby league career ==
Newton is now the chief executive officer of the Rugby League Players Association.

== Outside rugby league ==
While recuperating from injury in 2008, Clint caddied for Nikki Garrett during the Göteborg Masters in Sweden. Newton has also appeared alongside Garrett at the Jack Newton Celebrity Classic.

During 2009 Clint appeared on the BBC World News show, Peschardt's People, where he talked to journalist Michael Peschardt about rugby league, his life in Hull and his family.

== Career highlights ==
- Junior Club: Valentine-Eleebana (Newcastle)
- First Grade Debut: Newcastle v Warriors at EnergyAustralia Stadium, 31 March 2001 (Round 7)
- First Grade Record: 115 career NRL games to date, scoring 16 tries
- Super League Debut: Leeds v Hull KR at Headingley Stadium, 2 February 2008
