= Tommy Goulden =

English rugby league footballer

Personal information
- Full name: Tommy Goulden
- Born: 30 June 1981 (age 43)

Playing information
- Position: Second-row
Club
Years	Team	Pld	T	G	FG	P
2005–07	Rochdale Hornets	46	17	0	0	68
2008–09	Oldham	53	26	0	0	104
2010–15	Leigh Centurions	57	23	0	0	92
	Total	156	66	0	0	264
- As of 1 January 2012

Tommy Goulden (born 30 June 1981) is an English former professional rugby league footballer who played in the 2000s and 2010s. He played at club level for the Leigh Miners Rangers, the Rochdale Hornets, Oldham and the Leigh Centurions.

== Playing career ==
Goulden began his career as an amateur with the Leigh Miners Rangers before turning professional with the Rochdale Hornets in 2005. He played two seasons apiece for the Rochdale Hornets and later Oldham before joining hometown club the Leigh Centurions before the start of the 2010 season.

Goulden was a regular try scorer during his career and featured in Leigh's 20-16 Northern Rail Cup Final victory over Halifax in 2011.
