= Peter Fox (rugby league, born 1984) =

England international rugby league footballer

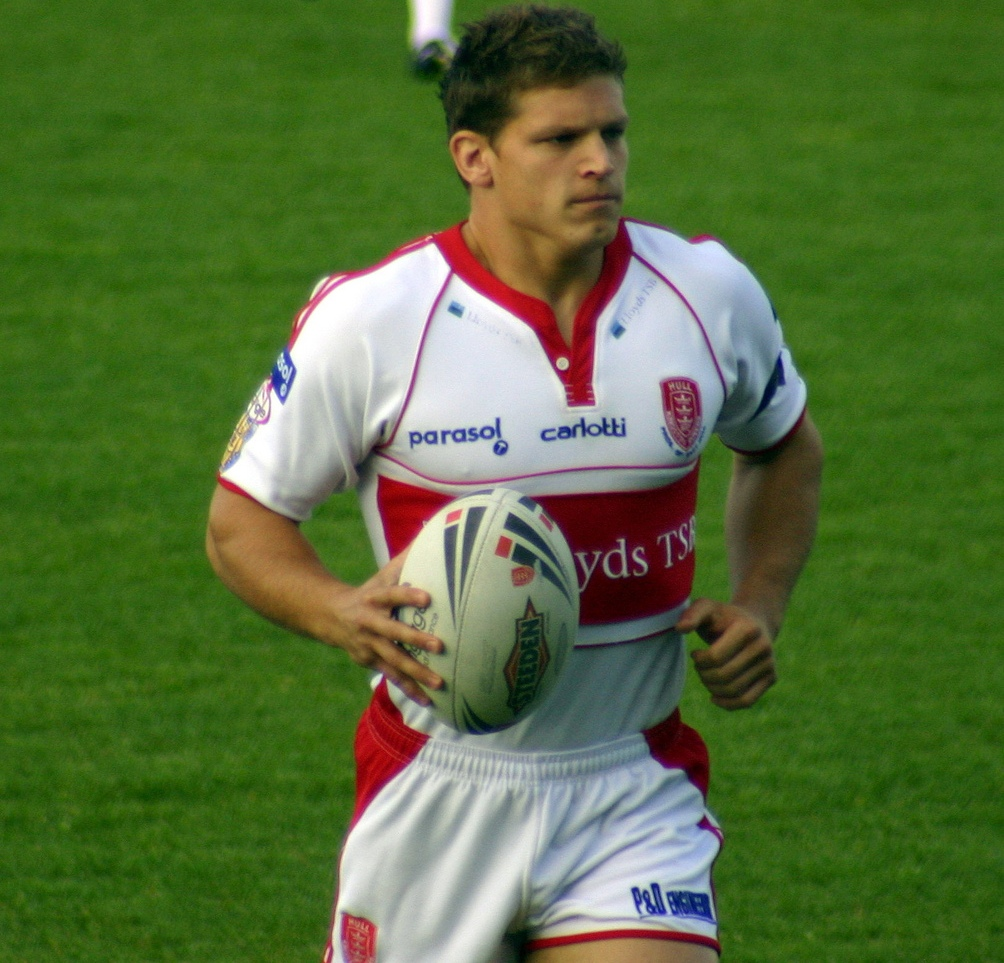

Personal information
- Born: 5 November 1984 (age 41) York, England

Playing information
- Height: 6 ft 0 in (1.83 m)
- Weight: 14 st 7 lb (92 kg)
- Position: Wing
Club
Years	Team	Pld	T	G	FG	P
2005–06	York City Knights	52	45	0	0	180
2007–08	Wakefield Trinity Wildcats	26	14	0	0	56
2008–11	Hull Kingston Rovers	110	61	0	0	242
2012–14	Wakefield Trinity Wildcats	70	48	0	0	182
2014(loan)	→ Halifax	17	11	0	0	44
2015	Doncaster	21	11	0	0	44
2016–17	Newcastle Thunder	32	17	0	0	68
	Total	328	207	0	0	816
Representative
Years	Team	Pld	T	G	FG	P
2008–09	England	6	7	0	0	28

Peter Fox (born 5 November 1984) is an English former professional rugby league footballer who played in the 2000s and 2010s. He played at representative level for England, and at club level for York Acorn, the York City Knights, the Wakefield Trinity Wildcats (two spells), Hull Kingston Rovers, Halifax (loan), Doncaster and Newcastle Thunder in League 1, as a wing.

== Background ==
Peter Fox was born in York, England.

== Club career ==
=== Early career ===
Fox started his career with junior club York Acorn. He was part of the academy at Leeds Rhinos, but he failed to establish himself in the senior team, and spent two seasons on loan at hometown club the York City Knights. He scored 40-tries for the York City Knights, and was named in the National League One Dream Team 2006.

At the end of the 2006's Super League XI, he was signed by the Wakefield Trinity Wildcats.

=== Wakefield Trinity Wildcats ===
Fox made his début for the Wakefield Trinity Wildcats in the opening game of 2007's Super League XII with a 9–14 defeat by Hull Kingston Rovers. It took him until round-5 to open his account with a try in the Wakefield Trinity Wildcats' 40–20 victory over Catalans Dragons. He signed for Hull Kingston Rovers during September 2007.

=== Hull Kingston Rovers ===
Fox made his début for Hull Kingston Rovers in a 12–20 defeat by the Leeds Rhinos at Headingley, Leeds. He opened his Hull Kingston Rovers account with two tries in a thrilling 20–24 victory in France against Catalans Dragons. In round 7 of the 2009 campaign he scored his first hat trick of his career in a 48–12 victory over Salford City Reds.

On 27 June, he made his England début in the 56–8 victory over France. He scored a try and had one disallowed.

He was in the England training squad for the 2008 Rugby League World Cup.

He was in the England team to face Wales at the Keepmoat Stadium, Doncaster prior to England's departure for the 2008 Rugby League World Cup.

On 7 November, he scored 2-tries to help England earn a shock 20–12 victory over World Champions New Zealand at Huddersfield's Galpharm Stadium, and a place in the 2009 Four Nations Final against Australia.

He has won caps for England while at Hull Kingston Rovers in 2008 against France and Wales, and in 2009 against France, Wales, New Zealand and Australia.

He made another promising start for Hull Kingston Rovers at the start of the 2010 season, in a home fixture against the Salford City Reds in which Hull Kingston Rovers won 30–12, he in the process scoring two early tries. He made his 100th career appearance in Hull Kingston Rovers' 6–32 defeat at the Wigan Warriors on 12 February 2010.

=== Return to the Wakefield Trinity Wildcats ===
Fox returned to the Wakefield Trinity Wildcats in 2012. He was released by the club during May 2014.

=== Doncaster ===
During April 2015, Fox signed for Championship side Doncaster.

=== Newcastle Thunder ===
During November 2015, it was announced the Fox was signing for Newcastle Thunder for the 2016 season.
