= Daniel Fitzhenry =

Australian rugby league footballer

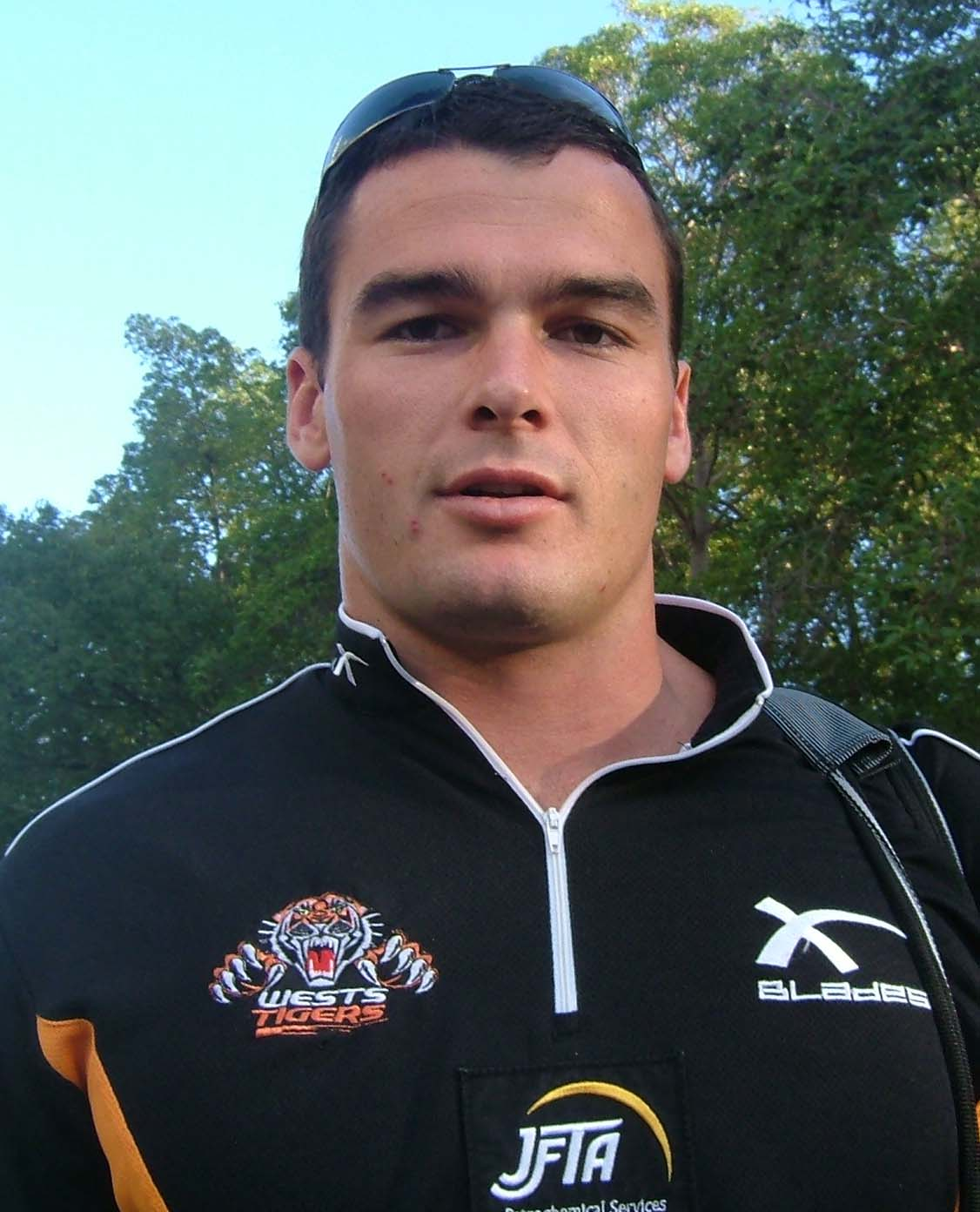
- Fitzhenry in 2005

Personal information
- Full name: Daniel Thomas Fitzhenry
- Born: 8 December 1979 (age 46) Macksville, New South Wales, Australia

Playing information
- Height: 179 cm (5 ft 10 in)
- Weight: 87 kg (13 st 10 lb)
- Position: Wing, Five-eighth, Fullback
Club
Years	Team	Pld	T	G	FG	P
2002–07	Wests Tigers	119	43	0	0	172
2008–09	Hull Kingston Rovers	53	18	0	0	72
2010	Wests Tigers	18	1	0	0	4
	Total	190	62	0	0	248

Daniel Fitzhenry (born 8 December 1979) is an Australian former professional rugby league footballer who played in the 2000s. He played for the Wests Tigers in the NRL and Hull Kingston Rovers in the Super League. He primarily played on the wing.

== Playing career ==
Fitzhenry played Jersey Flegg for the South Sydney Rabbitohs and had spent a period playing with Limoux Rugby League in France before being injured in a car accident.

After coming through the joint venture Wests Tigers' ranks with Western Suburbs, Fitzhenry made his début in the National Rugby League playing at centre in Round 14 of the 2002 NRL season against the Penrith Panthers at Leichhardt Oval.

Fitzhenry played at fullback for several games in 2002. His versatility has seen him play off the bench, as hooker and once as halfback (2004 against Canterbury-Bankstown. Injuries to the club's first choice player Benji Marshall saw Fitzhenry used as a makeshift 5/8th at times.

Fitzhenry was a member of Wests Tigers team that won the 2005 NRL Grand Final, defeating North Queensland 30–16. He scored a try in the 63rd minute to give Wests a 12-point lead. He also scored a try in the 2006 World Club Challenge which the Tigers lost to Bradford.

Fitzhenry held the record for the most tries scored by a player at the Wests Tigers, with 43, before being surpassed by Benji Marshall in 2010.

In 2010, Fitzhenry returned to the Wests Tigers after two seasons playing with Hull Kingston Rovers. He played in 18 games during the season, but was often named as a reserve back, getting little time on the field.

At the end of the season, Fitzhenry retired from the NRL, signing a two-year contract to captain-coach Southcity in the Group 9 competition. He won a premiership in his first season with the club.

An FWO member with the official FWO Banner and one of the first FWO shirts featuring the FWO logo

=== Career highlights ===
- Junior Club: Dorrigo & Nambucca Heads
- First Grade Debut: Round 14, Wests Tigers v Penrith at Leichhardt Oval, 15 June 2002
- Career Highlight: Wests Tigers Leading Tryscorer; try in the 2005 NRL Grand Final
- Premierships: 2005 (West Tigers v North Queensland Cowboys)
