= Chaz I'Anson =

English rugby league footballer

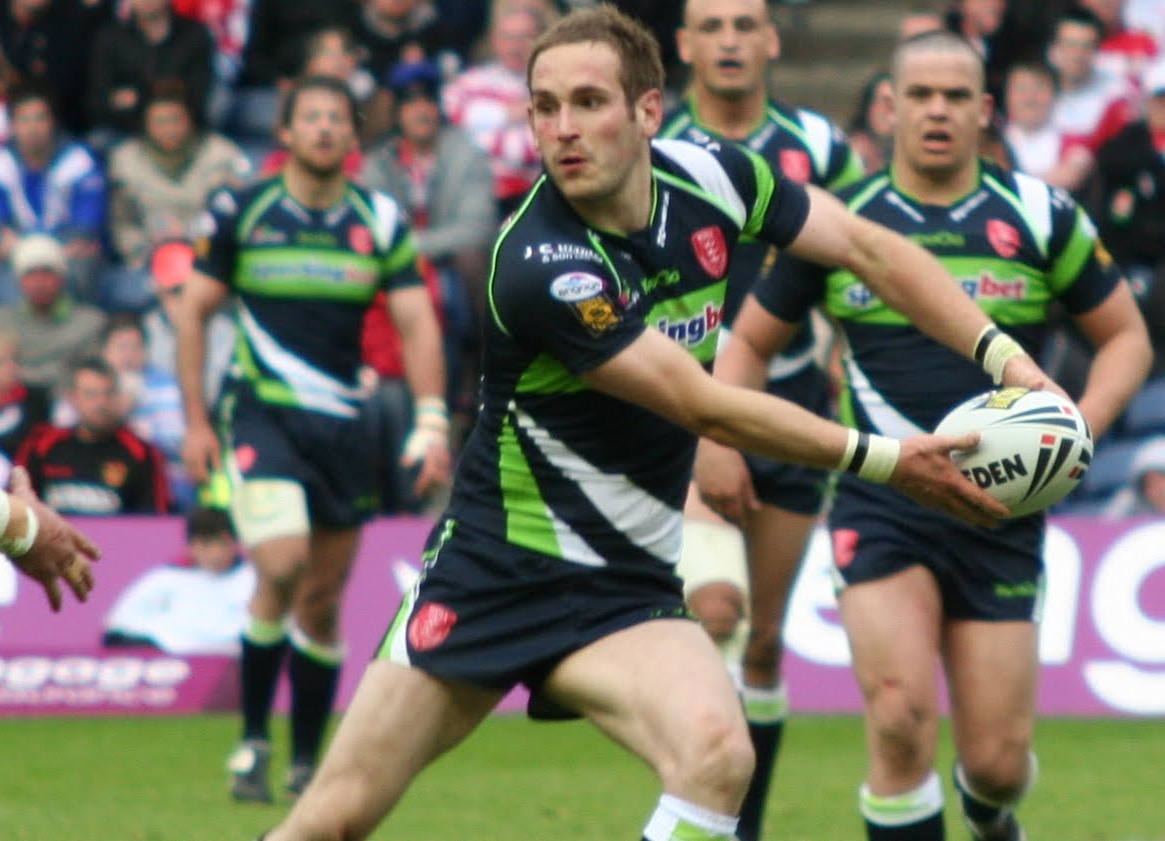

Personal information
- Full name: Charles William Thomas Paul Nikola I'Anson
- Born: 30 November 1986 (age 39) Kingston upon Hull, England

Playing information
- Position: Stand-off, Scrum-half
Club
| Years | Team | Pld | T | G | FG | P |
|---|---|---|---|---|---|---|
| 2007–10 | Hull Kingston Rovers | 32 | 4 | 0 | 0 | 16 |
| 2010–11 | Widnes Vikings | 21 | 4 | 0 | 1 | 17 |
| 2012–13 | Swinton Lions | 37 | 4 | 0 | 0 | 24 |
| | Total | 90 | 12 | 0 | 1 | 57 |
- Source: As of 10 February 2016

Charles William Thomas Paul Nikola "Chav" I'Anson (born 30 November 1986) is an English former professional rugby league footballer who last played at scrum half for the Swinton Lions but could also operate at stand off and loose forward.

I'Anson began his career with the Leeds Rhinos Academy but an unfortunate leg break curtailed his career with Leeds. He subsequently signed for hometown club Hull Kingston Rovers, and began to make a positive impression in the academy. His performances for Hull KR Academy led him to a Super League début in the last game of the 2007 season against the Huddersfield Giants.

In 2008, I'Anson made eight appearances scoring two tries including one in the Hull Derby. This form secured a contract for 2009 where he made 12 appearances in 2009's Super League XIV.

I'Anson scored three times in seven appearances for Hull Kingston Rovers in 2010 before going on a month's loan to Cooperative Championship club Widnes Vikings following Scrum Half James Webster's retirement. However, he suffered a season-ending knee injury just twenty minutes into his Vikings début.

Despite the injury lay off, the Widnes Vikings signed Chaz I'Anson on a 12-month contract for the 2011 season and handed him the number 7 jersey. In April 2011, he was named vice captain as the Vikings began preparations following the successful Super League application. I'Anson's return to fitness and form has led to the development of a promising half back partnership with the Wigan Warriors' dual registered Stand Off Joe Mellor.

In 2012,

I'Anson joined Championship Club Swinton Lions. In 2013 he started working at Wade Deacon High School.

== Background ==
Chaz I'Anson was born in Kingston upon Hull, Humberside, England.
