= Michael Vella =

Australia and Malta international rugby league footballer

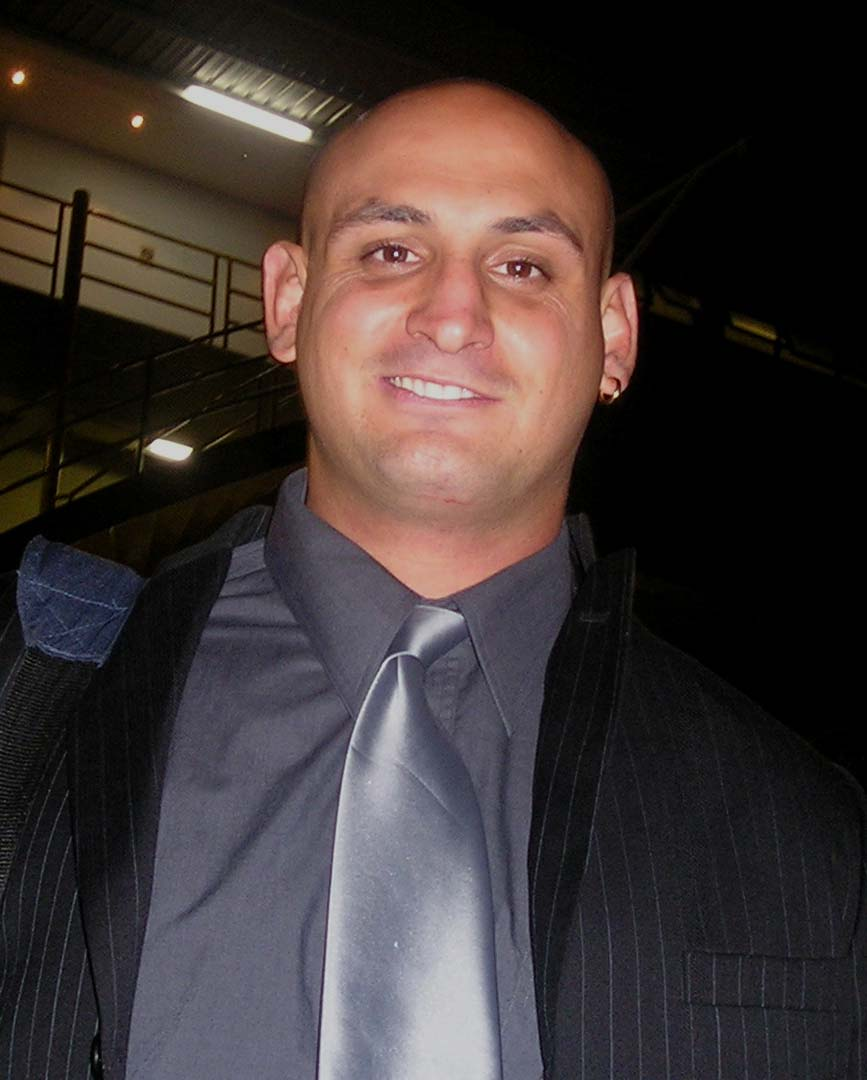
- Vella in 2005

Personal information
- Full name: Michael Vella
- Born: 19 February 1978 (age 48) Sydney, New South Wales, Australia

Playing information
- Height: 191 cm (6 ft 3 in)
- Weight: 106 kg (16 st 10 lb)
- Position: Prop
Club
| Years | Team | Pld | T | G | FG | P |
|---|---|---|---|---|---|---|
| 1998–06 | Parramatta Eels | 159 | 13 | 0 | 0 | 52 |
| 2007–11 | Hull Kingston Rovers | 121 | 14 | 0 | 0 | 56 |
| | Total | 280 | 27 | 0 | 0 | 108 |
Representative
| Years | Team | Pld | T | G | FG | P |
| 1999–02 | New South Wales | 10 | 0 | 0 | 0 | 0 |
| 1999–01 | Australia | 8 | 0 | 0 | 0 | 0 |
| | Malta | 0 | 0 | 0 | 0 | 0 |

Michael Vella is an Australian former professional rugby league footballer who played in the 1990s, 2000s and 2010s. A New South Wales State of Origin and Australian international representative forward, he played his club football in the NRL for the Parramatta Eels, and in the Super League for Hull Kingston Rovers, who he also captained. In addition to representing Australia internationally, he has played for the Malta Knights as he is of Maltese descent.

== Playing career ==
Vella made his first grade debut for Parramatta against North Queensland in Round 11 1998 at Willows Sports Complex.

Vella was selected to play from the interchange bench for New South Wales in Game II of the 1999 State of Origin series.

At club level, Vella was selected as the Dally M rookie of the year in 1999 and played 24 games for Parramatta as the club reached the preliminary final against Melbourne. Parramatta went into the break leading 16-0 but lost the match 18–16 at full time. At the end of the season he helped the Australian national team to victory in the final of the 1999 Tri-nations tournament. After that he represented Australia during their successful 2000 World Cup campaign and the following year went on the 2001 Kangaroo Tour.

Vella played for the Parramatta Eels at prop forward in their 2001 NRL grand final loss to the Newcastle Knights.

In 2005, the rugby league world was shocked to learn Vella was fighting thyroid cancer. Vella returned to the field midway through the 2005 season and was part of the Parramatta side which won the minor premiership that year. Parramatta went into the 2005 finals series as one of the favourites to take out the premiership but suffered a shock 29–0 loss against North Queensland in the preliminary final. Vella played in the match from the bench.

After time out of the game, he returned to the field for the Eels in 2006. Vella's final game for Parramatta was the 12-6 qualifying final loss against Melbourne. Vella then headed to England to play in the Super League for English club Hull Kingston Rovers where he was voted Players' Player of the Year in 2007. He also captained the club in his final year, 2011.

== Post playing ==
Since his retirement, Vella has returned to Australia where he has owned a fitness business, worked in a variety of roles for the NRL, and is currently brand ambassador for the Parramatta Eels In 2016, Vella became a trainer at his junior club Cherrybrook.
