= Nick Fozzard =

GB international rugby league footballer

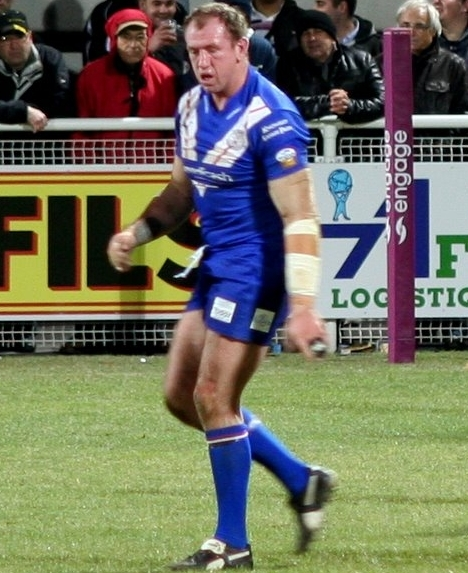

Personal information
- Full name: Nicholas Fozzard
- Born: 22 July 1977 (age 48); Wakefield, West Yorkshire, England

Playing information
- Height: 6 ft 3 in (1.91 m)
- Weight: 16 st 7 lb (105 kg)
- Position: Prop
Club
| Years | Team | Pld | T | G | FG | P |
|---|---|---|---|---|---|---|
| 1993–97 | Leeds Rhinos | 45 | 5 | 0 | 0 | 20 |
| 1997–00 | Huddersfield Giants | 55 | 4 | 0 | 0 | 16 |
| 2002–03 | Warrington Wolves | 54 | 2 | 0 | 0 | 8 |
| 2004–08 | St Helens | 126 | 9 | 0 | 0 | 36 |
| 2009 | Hull Kingston Rovers | 24 | 1 | 0 | 0 | 4 |
| 2010 | St Helens | 19 | 1 | 0 | 0 | 4 |
| 2011 | Castleford Tigers | 19 | 0 | 0 | 0 | 0 |
| 2012 | Dewsbury Rams | 2 | 0 | 0 | 0 | 0 |
| | Total | 344 | 22 | 0 | 0 | 88 |
Representative
| Years | Team | Pld | T | G | FG | P |
| | Yorkshire |
| 2005 | Great Britain | 1 | 0 | 0 | 0 | 0 |

Nick Fozzard (born 22 July 1977) is an English former professional rugby league footballer. He played at representative level for Great Britain and Yorkshire, and at club level for the Leeds Rhinos, Huddersfield Giants, Warrington Wolves, St Helens, Hull Kingston Rovers, Castleford Tigers, and in the Championship for the Dewsbury Rams.

== Career ==
=== Early career ===
Born in Wakefield, West Yorkshire, England, Fozzard signed for Leeds in 1993 from amateur club Shaw Cross, and made his first team debut in April 1994 against St Helens. He was signed by Huddersfield Giants in May 1997. Fozzard missed almost two full seasons after suffering a broken arm in a match against London Broncos in March 2000, and then breaking his arm a second time 10 months later. He joined Warrington Wolves in 2002, before signing for St Helens in 2004.

=== St Helens ===
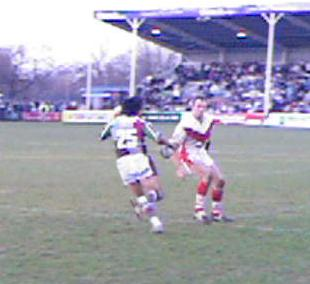
Fozzard about to tackle Zeb Luisi against Harlequins RL at the Twickenham Stoop

Fozzard played for Saints in their 32–16 win against Wigan Warriors in the 2004 Challenge Cup final.

In 2005, Fozzard was one of five uncapped players selected by Great Britain for the 2005 Tri-Nations. He received his one and only cap for the team in the opening match of the tournament, a 26–42 defeat against New Zealand.

In 2006, Fozzard extended his contract with Saints until the end of 2008. Due to increased competition for places, he missed out on St Helens 2006 Challenge Cup final victory.

As 2006 Super League champions, St Helens faced 2006 NRL Premiers the Brisbane Broncos in the 2007 World Club Challenge. Fozzard played as a prop in St. Helens' 18–14 victory. He also won his second Challenge Cup with the club, starting in the 30–8 win against Catalans Dragons in the 2007 Challenge Cup final, and was selected in the 2007 Super League Dream Team at the end of the season.

Fozzard missed most of the 2008 season after suffering a serious knee injury. He returned in time for the end of the season, helping the team secure a fourth consecutive League Leaders' Shield. He also played in the 2008 Super League Grand Final defeat by the Leeds Rhinos.

=== Later career ===
On 19 September 2008 Fozzard signed for Hull Kingston Rovers for the 2009 Super League campaign.

It was confirmed on 20 September 2009, that Fozzard would return to St. Helens after being released by Hull Kingston Rovers on the final year of his contract. Following a poor start to the 2010 season, Fozzard was dropped by coach Mick Potter.

Fozzard joined Castleford Tigers on a one-year deal on 16 September 2010. He retired in 2012 due to a serious shoulder injury.
