= Ryan Esders =

English rugby league footballer

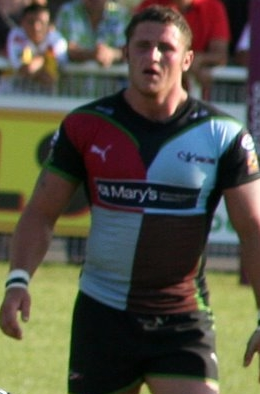

Personal information
- Full name: Ryan Esders
- Born: 20 October 1986 (age 39) Kingston upon Hull, England

Playing information
- Position: Second-row, Loose forward
Club
Years	Team	Pld	T	G	FG	P
2006–07	York City Knights
2008–09	Hull Kingston Rovers	2	0	0	0	0
2009–10	Harlequins RL	22	3	0	0	12
2010(loan)	→ York City Knights	6	5	0	0	20
2011	York City Knights	18	8	0	0	32
2012	Dewsbury Rams	23	9	0	0	36
	Total	71	25	0	0	100

Ryan Esders (born 20 October 1986 in Kingston upon Hull) is an English former rugby league footballer who played in the 2000s and 2010s. He played at club level in the Championship for York City Knights (three spells, including the second on loan from Harlequins RL for the 2010 season), in the Super League for Hull Kingston Rovers and Harlequins RL, and in the Championship for Dewsbury Rams as a second-row or loose forward.

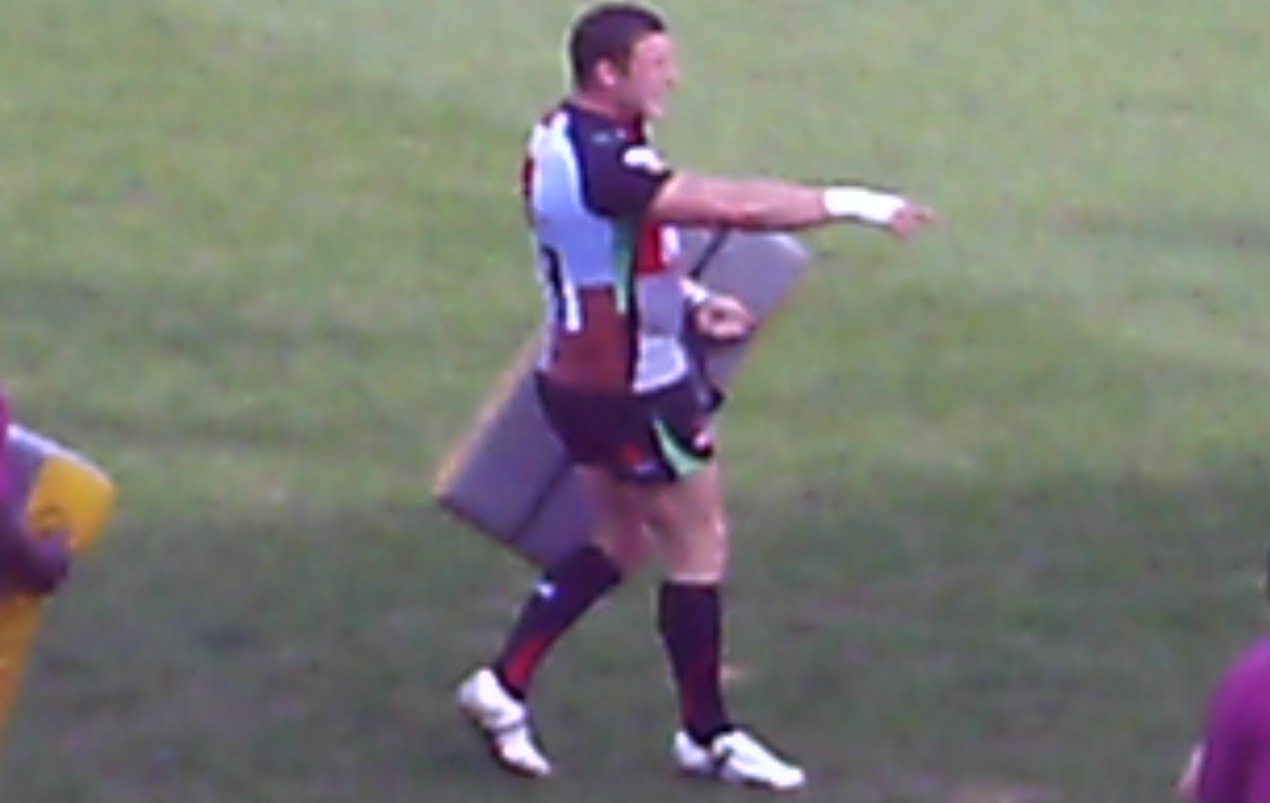
Esders with a tackle bag
