= Kyle Bibb =

English rugby league footballer

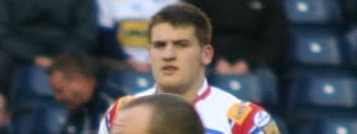

Personal information
- Born: 25 January 1987 (age 39) England

Playing information
- Height: 6 ft 2 in (188 cm)
- Weight: 16 st 9 lb (106 kg)
- Position: Prop
Club
Years	Team	Pld	T	G	FG	P
2007	Hull F.C.
2008–10	Wakefield Trinity Wildcats	23	0	0	0	0
2009(loan)	→ Hull Kingston Rovers	2	0	0	0	0
2010(loan)	→ Harlequins RL	2	0	0	0	0
2010	Dewsbury Rams	2	0	0	0	0
2012	Doncaster RLFC	0	0	0	0	0
	Total	29	0	0	0	0

Kyle Bibb (born 25 January 1987) is an English former professional rugby league footballer who last played for the Doncaster RLFC in the Championship, as a prop.

He previously played in the Super League for Hull FC, Wakefield Trinity Wildcats, Hull Kingston Rovers and Harlequins RL, Bibb joined the Wakefield Trinity Wildcats after a season in the second team at Hull F.C. making many first team appearances throughout the 2009 season. He was on loaned to Harlequins RL but was recalled by Wakefield Trinity Wildcats. In September 2010 Kyle Bibb signed for Championship One side the Dewsbury Rams.
