= Paul Cooke (rugby league) =

English RL coach and former England international rugby league footballer

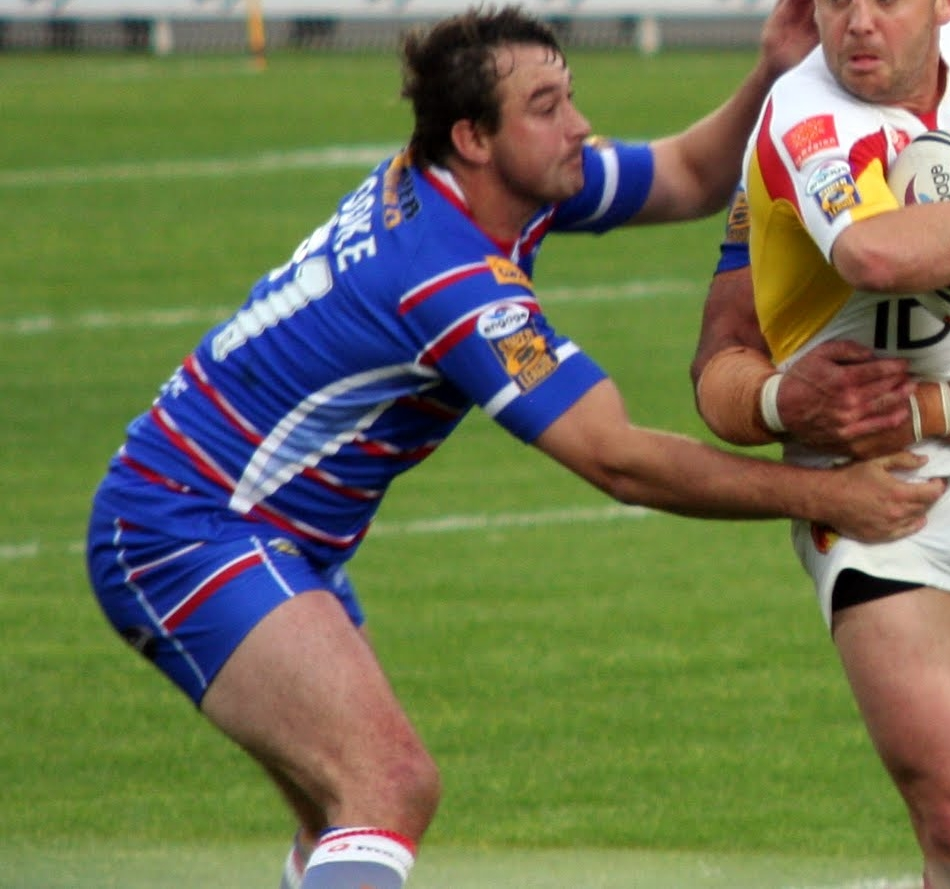

Personal information
- Full name: Paul Cooke
- Born: 17 April 1981 (age 45) Hull, Humberside, England
- Height: 6 ft 5 in (1.96 m)
- Weight: 16 st 0 lb (102 kg)

Playing information
- Position: Stand-off, Loose forward
Club
Years	Team	Pld	T	G	FG	P
1999–07	Hull FC	204	32	332	4	796
2007–10	Hull Kingston Rovers	65	9	92	0	222
2010	Wakefield Trinity	18	3	38	2	90
2012–15	Doncaster	86	18	53	2	180
2015	Featherstone Rovers	10	2	0	0	8
	Total	383	64	515	8	1296
Representative
Years	Team	Pld	T	G	FG	P
2006	England	3	0	0	0	0

Coaching information
Club
Years	Team	Gms	W	D	L	W%
2014–15	Doncaster	2	1	0	1	50
2025	Featherstone Rovers	28	16	0	12	57
2027–	Featherstone Rovers	0	0	0	0
	Total	30	17	0	13	57
- Source: As of 21 September 2025

Paul Cooke (born 17 April 1981) is an English former professional rugby league footballer who played in the 1990s, 2000s and 2010s, and rugby league, and rugby union coach of the 2010s.

He is currently Head coach at Featherstone Rovers.

He played at representative level for England, and at club level in the Super League for Hull FC, Hull Kingston Rovers, and Wakefield Trinity, and in the Championship 1 and Championship for Doncaster and Featherstone Rovers, as a stand-off, or loose forward, and has coached rugby league (RL) for Doncaster, and the Leigh Centurions (assistant coach), and rugby union (RU) for the Doncaster Knights (Skills, and Backs Coach).

== Background ==
Cooke was born in East Hull, Humberside.

== Playing career ==
=== Hull FC ===
Cooke made his first team debut for Hull against St Helens in April 1999.

His pairing with Richard Horne led to the memorable victory over Leeds in the 2005 Challenge Cup Final in which Cooke scored the winning try to give Hull FC a 25–24 victory. Hull FC reached the 2006 Super League Grand final to be contested against St. Helens, and Cooke played stand-off in his side's 4–26 loss.

On 22 July after being given a franchise for Super League from 2009 to 2011 Salford City Reds coach Shaun McRae said he would be interested in speaking to Cooke with an intention of him joining his side, Cooke and McRae worked together at Hull FC earlier in their careers, though Cooke did not go on to play for the Salford City Reds.

=== Hull Kingston Rovers ===
On 19 April 2007, BBC Look North (East Yorkshire and Lincolnshire) announced that Cooke was to walk out on Hull FC to join cross city rivals Hull Kingston Rovers. Cooke was born in East Hull where Hull KR are based and supported the club as a youngster. He played his last game for Hull F.C. against Bradford that night. In his autobiography many years later, Cooke revealed that he was unhappy with the club for failing to honour an agreement that they would apply for his testimonial in 2008.

On 23 April 2007, it was announced that Cooke had signed a three-and-a-half-year deal with Hull Kingston Rovers, taking effect immediately. The Rugby Football League (RFL) initially blocked this transfer stating that his registration remained with Hull FC. Some confusion followed amid allegations that he had never signed his contract with Hull FC, despite local media reports at the time to the contrary. However the move went ahead and he duly turned up playing for Hull Kingston Rovers the following week.

In November 2007, a RFL tribunal found Cooke guilty of misconduct for approaching Hull Kingston Rovers while still under contract to Hull FC. His punishment included a ban that ruled him out of the first six games of the 2008 season.

Following the tribunal decision Hull F.C. chief executive James Rule said "We will now take time to consider our next steps with regard to potential future civil action" suggesting the Cooke transfer saga may be far from over. However, it died down, and by the end of the 2009 season Cooke had settled into the Hull Kingston Rovers team, making a major contribution to his team's next two Super League finishes of 7th and 4th.

=== Wakefield Trinity ===
Wakefield Trinity signed Cooke from Hull Kingston Rovers until the end of the 2010–11 season, the 28-year-old stand-off/loose forward, had been out of favour at Hull Kingston Rovers that season. Cooke made his début with Wakefield against Salford on Sunday 21 March 2010, and made his full début in the 36–16 defeat at Warrington, and his first full home game when Wakefield Trinity won 19–6 against neighbours Castleford.

Cooke had the option to earn a deal for next season, whether that was at Wakefield Trinity or another club.

=== Doncaster RLFC ===
After spending a year away from rugby league for personal reasons, Cooke signed for Championship 1 side Doncaster RLFC in January 2012, after fans and sponsors agreed to pay half his salary. He combined playing for the club with a full-time job in their development department. He also signed as a backs coach for Doncaster Knights, the town's rugby union club, for the 2013/14 season.

=== Featherstone Rovers ===
Cooke made his début for Featherstone Rovers on Sunday 28 June 2015, and he played his last match for Featherstone during the 2015 season.

== Coaching career ==
=== Featherstone Rovers ===
On 27 February 2025 he was announced as the new head coach, following the sacking of James Ford the day before, with Ged Corcoran as assistant
