= Liam Colbon =

English rugby league footballer

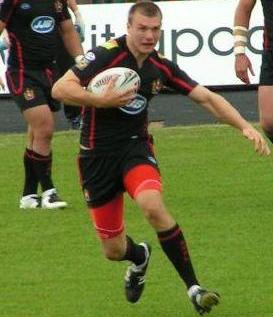

Personal information
- Full name: Liam Francis Colbon
- Born: 20 September 1984 (age 41) Higher End, Wigan, Greater Manchester

Playing information
- Height: 6 ft 2 in (1.88 m)
- Weight: 15 st 4 lb (97 kg)
- Position: Wing, Centre, Second-row
Club
Years	Team	Pld	T	G	FG	P
2004–08	Wigan Warriors	52	16	0	0	64
2009–11	Hull Kingston Rovers	54	21	0	0	84
2012–13	London Broncos	23	5	0	0	20
2014	Hull FC	8	1	0	0	4
2014(loan)	→ Doncaster	8	1	0	0	4
	Total	145	44	0	0	176

Liam Colbon (born 20 September 1984) is an English former professional rugby league footballer who played in the 2000s and 2010s. He played in the Super League for; the Wigan Warriors, Hull Kingston Rovers, the London Broncos and Hull FC, and in the Championship for Doncaster (loan), as a wing or centre.

== Early career ==
Colbon played for Orrell St. James and Hindley ARLFC before joining Wigan. He attended St Peter's Catholic High School. He spent several season in Wigan Warriors Youth Development setup before making his first team début after coming on as a substitute in Terry O'Connor's testimonial match against London Broncos in November 2003. He made his competitive first team full début again starting as a substitute against Widnes Vikings in 2004's Super League IX Round 10 after impressing in the Academy U21s. Liam make 4 more appearances for Wigan during 2004 against; Wakefield Trinity Wildcats twice, Hull FC and Widnes Vikings again when he was in the starting 13 for the first time for Wigan.

== Wigan career ==
Colbon was a substitute in two pre-season friendlies in 2005 one against Salford City Reds, and the other against London Broncos. Liam made his first start of 2005 in the Wigan Warriors' 16–18 defeat by Wakefield Trinity Wildcats at Belle Vue in which he set up a try for David Vaealiki. His next appearance was an impressive performance against Hull when he scored his first try for Wigan. Liam came on as a substitute and scored a 90-metre interception try and later made a try saving tackle to help Wigan win the game 21–15. Liam was to make 5 more appearances for Wigan against; Huddersfield Giants, Leeds Rhinos, Bradford Bulls, Warrington Wolves and St. Helens. By the end of 2005 he had made 9 appearances and scoring 2 tries.

During 2006, Colbon only made one appearance during a pre-season friendly against Leigh Centurions however this could be due to Wigan having a poor season and spending most of it fighting against relegation. Wigan sacked head coach Ian Millward, and replaced him with Brian Noble who used more experienced players in his squad such as Nathan McAvoy rather than academy players. Liam continued to make appearances in the Senior Academy whilst continuing his education as he studied for a degree in Sports Studies at Edge Hill University.

In 2007, Colbon finished his university qualification gaining his degree and took part in a Parachute Regiment training scheme which he completed and was awarded his beret. He started the season in the Wigan Warriors Youth Development academy but he impressed head coach Brian Noble and the after departure of Chris Ashton he was given a first team opportunity in July against Bradford Bulls. Afterwards he featured regularly in the Wigan first team scoring 6 tries in 13 starts and was rewarded with a new one-year contract for 2008. Speaking at the time he said "I'm glad it's all been sorted. I always wanted to stay here, it's a great club and there is a great spirit in the team". He was given the number 14 shirt for the 2008 season.

Despite being picked ahead of teammate Mark Calderwood for most of the season and making twenty three starts he was not offered a new contract by Wigan and was allowed to leave. Hull Kingston Rovers announced that they had signed Colbon and he was given the squad number five for the 2009 season.

== Hull Kingston Rovers career ==
He made his début in a 13–13 draw away to Bradford Bulls. Colbon's first try came in a 31–18 home victory over Wakefield Trinity Wildcats. Hull Kingston Rovers fans recognised the work that Colbon gets through in defence and the metres gained in attack. He only scored 9 tries in 2009 but scored 6 in 2010. He had a stunning start to the season, scoring 5 tries by round 7, during round 4 against St. Helens he scored a hat trick which crucially helped them win 28–24. In his final season, he made 13 appearances scoring 6 tries.

== Hull F.C. career ==
In the 2014 season, Colbon was dual-registered with Hull FC and Doncaster. On 19 February 2014, it was announced that he had signed a 1-year contract with Hull FC. Currently, he has made 8 appearances for Hull FC as a winger. He has started games regularly since the injury of Super League Dream Team winger Tom Lineham.

Between Colbon finishing up at the London Broncos and signing a new deal with Hull, he qualified as a Master running Coach.

== Career statistics ==
Year	Club	Appearances	Tries	Goals	Drop Goals	Points	Sin Binned	Sent Off
2004	Wigan	1(4)	0	0	0	0	0	0
2005	Wigan	4(5)	2	0	0	8	0	0
2006	Wigan	0(0)	0	0	0	0	0	0
2007	Wigan	13(0)	6	0	0	24	0	0
2008	Wigan	23(7)	10	0	0	40	0	0
2009	Hull Kingston Rovers	25	8	0	0	32	0	0
2010	Hull Kingston Rovers	14	6	0	0	24	0	0
2011	Hull Kingston Rovers	13	6	0	0	24	0	0
2012	London Broncos	8	2	0	0	8	0	0
2013	London Broncos	15	3	0	0	12	0	0
2014	Doncaster	8	1	0	0	4	0	0
2014	Hull FC	8	1	0	0	4	0	0
Total		123(16)	44	0	0	176	0	0

(For 2014 Super League season highlights, stats and results click on 2014 Super League season results)
