= Michael Dobson (rugby league) =

Australian rugby league footballer

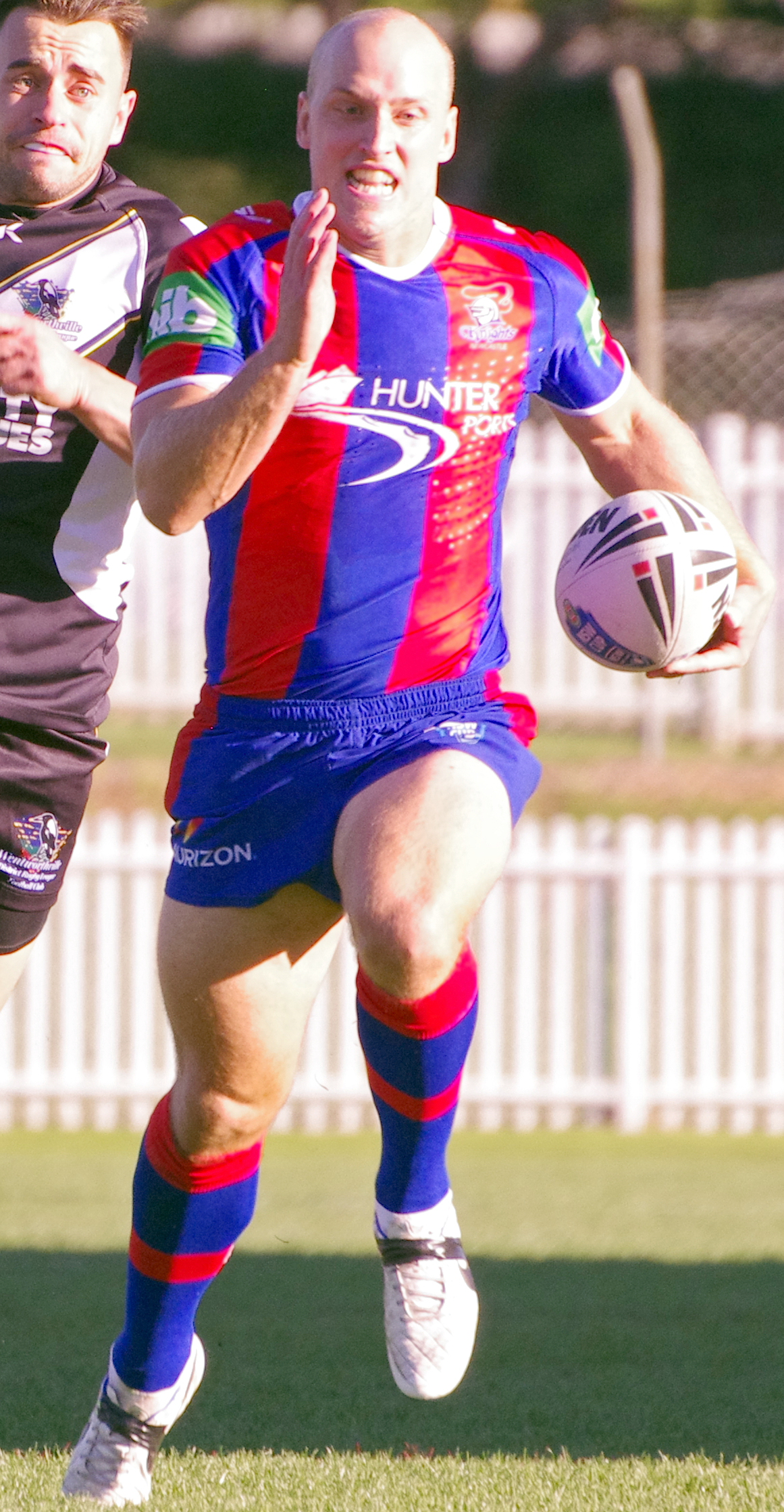

Personal information
- Born: 29 May 1986 (age 40) Junee, New South Wales, Australia

Playing information
- Height: 177 cm (5 ft 10 in)
- Weight: 83 kg (13 st 1 lb)
- Position: Halfback, Five-eighth
Club
Years	Team	Pld	T	G	FG	P
2006	Catalans Dragons	12	5	41	1	103
2006	Wigan Warriors	14	6	61	0	146
2007–08	Canberra Raiders	20	3	56	0	124
2008–13	Hull Kingston Rovers	153	53	534	12	1292
2014	Newcastle Knights	6	0	0	0	0
2015–17	Salford Red Devils	80	16	118	2	302
	Total	285	83	810	15	1967

Michael Dobson (born 29 May 1986) is an Australian professional rugby league coach who is the head coach of the Newcastle Knights in the New South Wales Cup and a former professional rugby league footballer.

He played for Australian NRL clubs Canberra Raiders and Newcastle Knights, and European Super League clubs Catalans Dragons, Wigan Warriors, Hull Kingston Rovers and Salford Red Devils. He primarily played as a halfback or five-eighth. In 2009, he won the Albert Goldthorpe Medal.

== Background ==
Born in Junee, New South Wales, Dobson attended Erindale College and played his junior rugby league for the Junee Diesels, before being signed by the Canberra Raiders. In 2003 and 2004, Dobson played for the Australian Schoolboys team.

== Professional playing career ==
=== Catalans Dragons ===
In 2006, the Canberra Raiders loaned Dobson to French club Catalans Dragons of Super League as a replacement for injured halfback Stacey Jones.

=== Wigan Warriors ===
After impressing at the Catalans Dragons, Dobson attracted the attention of several other Super League clubs, subsequently being signed by the Wigan Warriors in May 2006. There was some controversy over Dobson's signing for the Wigan Warriors. Under English law, Dobson was not permitted to play in England because he did not have a work permit. However, the Wigan Warriors managed to obtain a work permit for him, albeit in controversial circumstances. When Dobson signed for the Wigan Warriors, they were at the bottom of the Super League table, 6-points behind the nearest team and heading towards relegation. Dobson's impact at the Wigan Warriors helped the team survive relegation in the 2006 season.

In 2006, Dobson was statistically the best goal-kicker in the world with a success rate of 84%, equal to or better than St. Helens' Jamie Lyon, 81% and National Rugby League players Hazem El Masri, 84% and Andrew Johns, 80%.

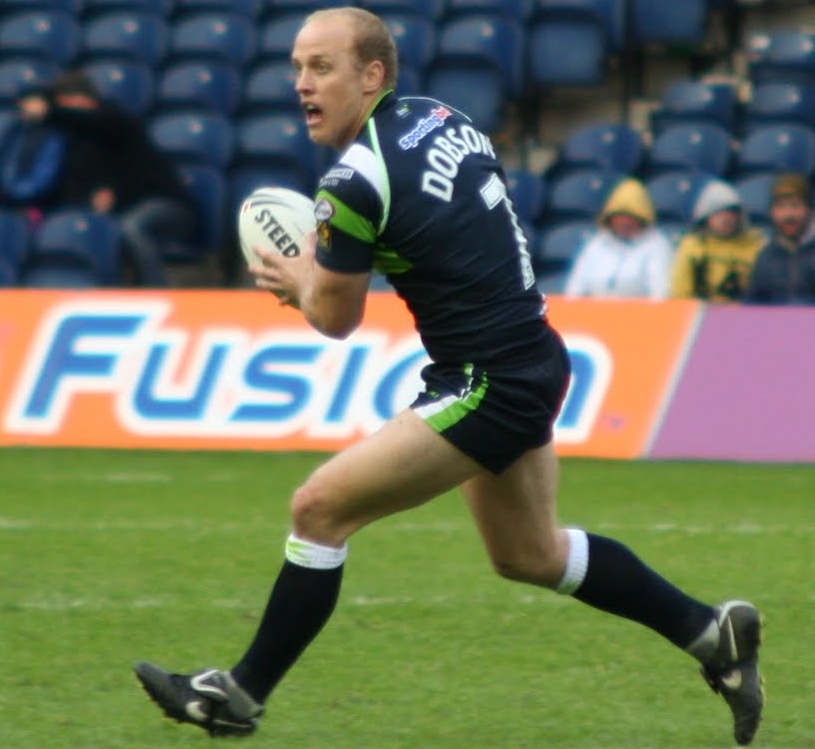
Dobson playing for Hull Kingston Rovers in 2010.

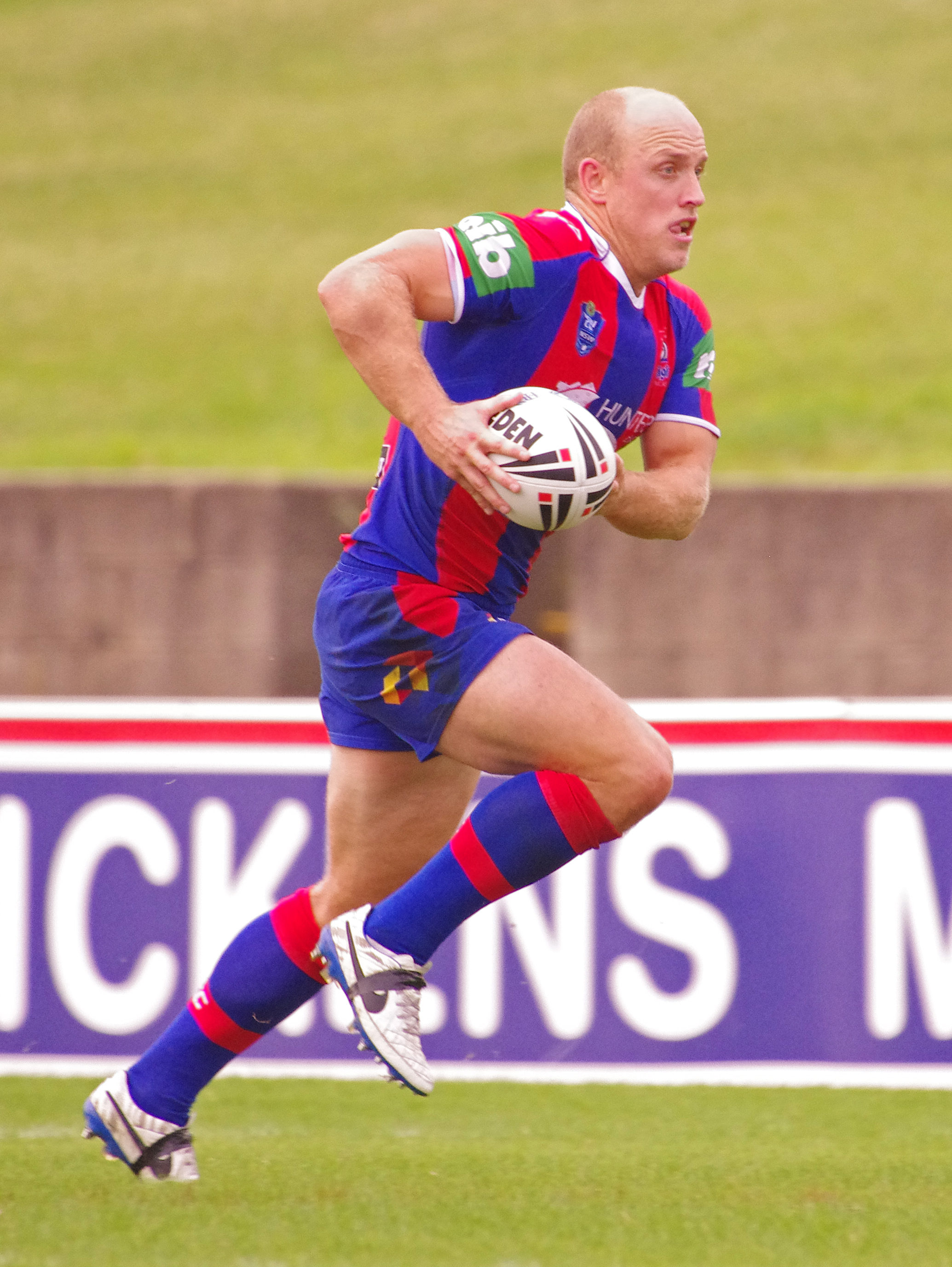
Dobson playing for the Knights in 2014

=== Canberra Raiders ===
At the end of 2006, Dobson rejoined the Canberra Raiders. In 2007, Dobson was the club's leading point-scorer. In April 2008, Dobson signed a 2 1/2-year contract with Hull Kingston Rovers effective immediately after being released from his Raiders contract. He was also linked to Super League clubs Hull F.C. and Harlequins RL.

=== Hull Kingston Rovers ===
In 2009, Dobson helped Hull Kingston Rovers into fourth place in only their third Super League season. His individual performances saw him become the second winner of the Albert Goldthorpe Medal which is presented by Rugby Leaguer & League Express.

Dobson started the 2010 season with a try and five goals in a 30–12 win over Salford City Reds.

In 2013, Dobson played for the Exiles against England. On 27 June 2013, Dobson signed a one-year contract with the Newcastle Knights starting in 2013 to return to the National Rugby League in Australia.

=== Newcastle Knights ===
Dobson started playing for Newcastle in the 2014 NRL season. Dobson played for the Knights in the inaugural Auckland Nines series prior to the 2014 NRL season in February 2014. With an injury to the Newcastle Knights regular Jarrod Mullen, Dobson made his top-grade début for Newcastle in their 30–8 defeat by Penrith Panthers. Dobson made 25 tackles in the game, the third highest on the day for the Newcastle club. Dobson also played against his former club Canberra Raiders (in a 20–26 defeat), Melbourne Storm (in a 28–20 defeat), Cronulla-Sutherland Sharks (in a 30–0 victory), North Queensland Cowboys (in a 28–2 defeat) and Brisbane Broncos (in a 48–6 defeat).

On 21 September 2014, Dobson was named at halfback in the 2014 NSW Cup Team of the Year.

=== Salford Red Devils ===
On 22 May 2014, it was reported that the Salford Red Devils of the Super League, had recruited Dobson for the 2015 season. In the match report following Salford's 4–25 defeat by the Wigan Warriors, it was reported "Salford will have re-inforcements next season with former Hull Kingston Rovers player Michael Dobson arriving from Australia after a far from happy time in the NRL."

On 16 June 2014, Dobson officially signed a four-year contract with the Salford club starting in 2015.

== Coaching career ==
After returning to Australia to play for the Wynnum Manly Seagulls, Dobson spent some time coaching in the junior ranks with the club, before taking up an opportunity at the Newcastle Knights.

== Statistics ==
Year	Team	Games	Tries	Goals	FGs	Pts
2006	Catalans Dragons	12	5	41	1	103
2006	Wigan Warriors	14	5	61		142
2007	Canberra Raiders	18	3	56		124
2008	Canberra Raiders	2				
2008	Hull Kingston Rovers	14	8	25	1	83
2009	Hull Kingston Rovers	32	11	115	2	284
2010	Hull Kingston Rovers	30	11	114	3	289
2011	Hull Kingston Rovers	23	7	91	4	216
2012	Hull Kingston Rovers	27	9	104	1	245
2013	Hull Kingston Rovers	27	6	88	1	203
2014	Newcastle Knights	6				
2015	Salford Red Devils	21	3	30	2	74
2016	Salford Red Devils	33	6	27		78
2017	Salford Red Devils	26	7	62	1	153
	Totals	285	83	810	15	1967
