= Ben Galea =

Australian rugby league footballer (born 1978)

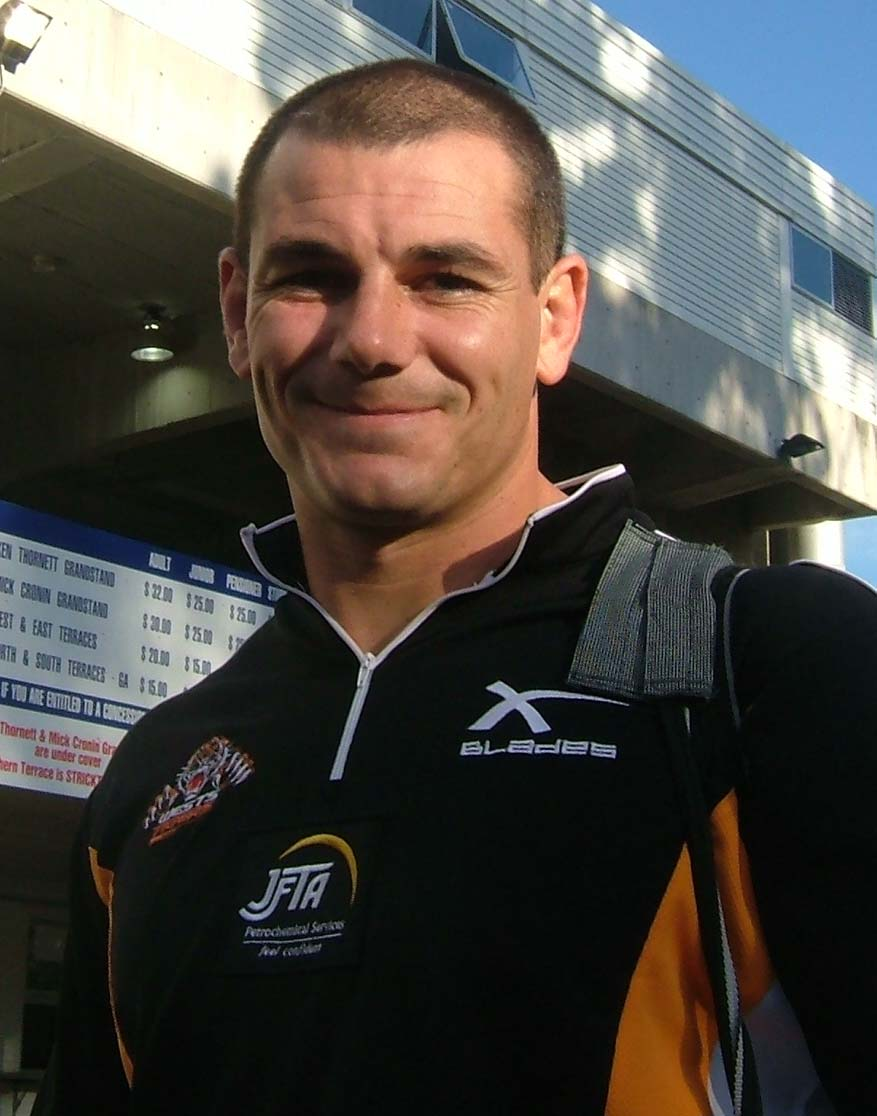

Personal information
- Full name: Ben Aaron Galea
- Born: 16 August 1978 (age 48) Parramatta, New South Wales, Australia

Playing information
- Height: 178 cm (5 ft 10 in)
- Weight: 95 kg (14 st 13 lb)
- Position: Second-row, Lock, Hooker, Five-eighth
Club
Years	Team	Pld	T	G	FG	P
1999	Balmain Tigers	2	0	0	0	0
2000–07	Wests Tigers	150	32	0	0	128
2008–12	Hull Kingston Rovers	126	36	0	0	144
2013	Hull F.C.	15	3	0	0	12
	Total	293	71	0	0	284
Representative
Years	Team	Pld	T	G	FG	P
2001	City Origin	1	0	0	0	0

Ben Galea (born 16 August 1978) is an Australian former professional rugby league footballer. A City New South Wales representative forward, he previously played in Australasia's National Rugby League for the Balmain Tigers and the Wests Tigers (with whom he won the 2005 NRL Premiership) and also for English clubs Hull Kingston Rovers and Hull F.C. of the Super League.

== Background ==
Galea was born on 16 August 1978, in Parramatta, and is of Maltese descent. While attending Marayong John Paul II, he played for the Australian Schoolboys team in 1996.

== Playing career ==
After struggling to make an impact in the lower grades at the Parramatta Eels, Galea signed with the newly merged Wests Tigers.

=== National Rugby League ===
In 2000, Galea in made a handful of NRL appearances for the Tigers from the bench. In 2001, Galea became a regular member of the Tigers' team. He represented City and was named the club's player of the year. After missing the first 2 games of the season, he played in every other game.

In 2003, Galea played 14 games before his season ended when he needed a shoulder reconstruction.

Galea played at second-row forward in the 2005 NRL grand final victory over the North Queensland Cowboys. In the moments after the grand final victory, Galea was interviewed by Channel 9 sideline commentator Matthew Johns and was asked how it felt to be a premiership winner. Galea replied, "This is unbelievable, fucking all the boys have stuck together all year, we won the comp, we're number one, fucking ..." In the following days, the Wests Tigers club issued an apology for the inappropriate language used by some of their players.

As NRL Premiers, Wests travelled to England to play against Super League champions Bradford Bulls in the 2006 World Club Challenge. Galea played at lock forward in the Tigers' 30–10 loss.

When Galea moved from the Wests Tigers at the end of the 2007 NRL season, he was the joint venture's second most capped player with 150 games, and second highest try scorer, with 32 tries. In 2017, Galea was made a Wests Tiger Life Member.

=== Super League ===
From 2008 to 2012, Galea played in the Super League for Hull Kingston Rovers. On 13 September 2012, Galea confirmed that he had reversed his decision to retire in order to sign a one-year deal for former West Tigers assistant Peter Gentle at Hull FC.

=== Highlights ===
- Junior Club: Penrith and Blacktown Workers
- First Grade Debut: 1999 – Round 14, Balmain v Western Suburbs Magpies at Campbelltown Stadium, 6 June
- Premierships: Member of Wests Tigers 2005 Premiership team

== Referee ==
As of the 2014 NRL season, Galea works regularly as a video referee in the Australian competition.
