= Shaun Briscoe =

England international rugby league footballer

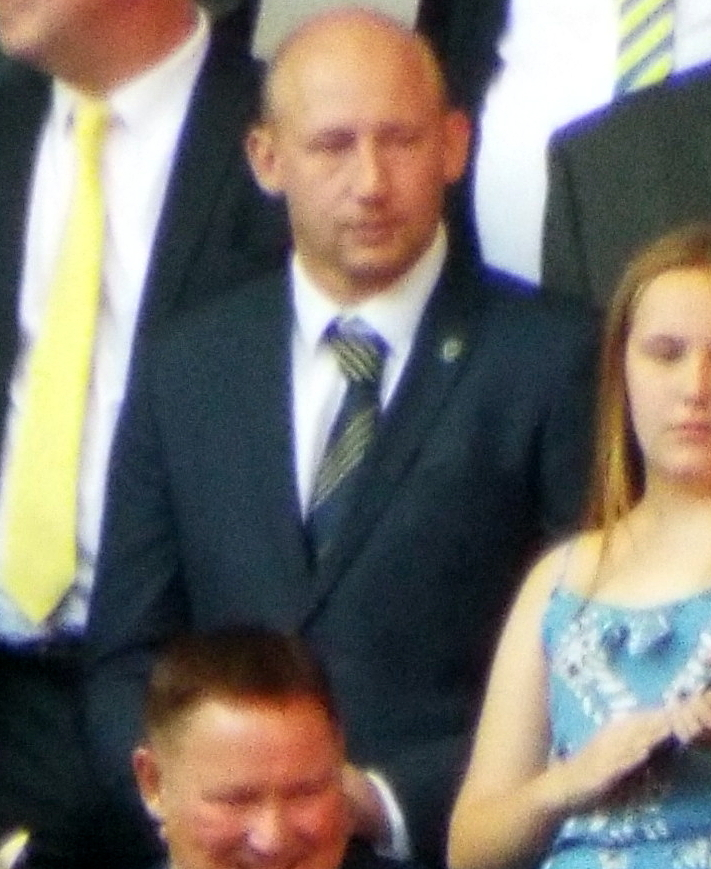

Personal information
- Born: 23 February 1983 (age 43) Higher End, Wigan, Greater Manchester, England

Playing information
- Height: 6 ft 1 in (1.85 m)
- Weight: 14 st 9 lb (93 kg)
- Position: Fullback, Wing
Club
Years	Team	Pld	T	G	FG	P
2002–03	Wigan Warriors	29	11	0	0	44
2003–07	Hull FC	103	57	0	0	228
2008–11	Hull Kingston Rovers	100	30	0	0	120
2012–13	Widnes Vikings	14	6	0	0	24
2013	Workington Town	6	5	0	0	20
	Total	252	109	0	0	436
Representative
Years	Team	Pld	T	G	FG	P
2004–09	England	11	4	0	0	16

Shaun Briscoe (born 23 February 1983) is an English former professional rugby league footballer. An England international representative outside back, he has played club football for the Wigan Warriors, Hull FC, Hull Kingston Rovers, and the Widnes Vikings. He is currently the head coach of the world champion England Physical Disability Rugby League team.

== Club career ==
=== Wigan Warriors ===
Briscoe was born in Higher End, in the Wigan area, and grew up in nearby Hindley, and attended Winstanley College. He started his rugby career at Wigan playing for the Academy side before making his first team début for Wigan against Castleford in 2002.

A year later Briscoe was named in Wigan's first team squad for that season. He was the regular full back for Wigan for 3 months in the absence of the injured Kris Radlinski. Briscoe played well making 28 appearances and scoring 11 tries but he was dropped from the squad when Kris Radlinski returned. He was disappointed to have lost his place but said "I'll be fighting for a place, and I can play centre or wing as well. I'm only young and to get so many first team games this season has been an unexpected bonus. I'll continue to train hard and play my best and see how things pan out. If things haven't worked out by the end of next year then I may have to think about going somewhere else, but it would really hurt me to have to leave my home town club."

Many Wigan fans saw Briscoe as the replacement for Radlinski once he retired but due to salary cap restrictions and Shaun's desire to play first team rugby he was released from his Wigan contract and joined Hull F.C. in December 2003.

His biggest achievement though, came in 2004 when he was selected into the Super League dream team ahead of players such as Paul Wellens, Kris Radlinski and Daryl Cardiss

=== Hull F.C. ===
Briscoe made an impact at Hull and became their regular first team fullback. He became the first Hull player to score four tries in one match giving Hull their first win at the Bradford Bulls in the Super League. He played an important role in Hull's Challenge Cup run in 2005 but missed the final due to appendicitis. Hull went on to win the match and Briscoe was given a winning medal for being in the squad.

In 2006, he spent part of the season playing on the wing to cover for injuries in the Hull squad. Hull reached the 2006 Super League Grand final to be contested against St Helens, and Briscoe played at fullback in his side's 4–26 loss at Old Trafford, putting in a tackle into touch on Ade Gardner, and a tackle to stop Jamie Lyon.

=== Hull Kingston Rovers ===
Briscoe signed for Hull Kingston Rovers on a two-year contract in September 2007. He missed out on the England squad for the France game in early 2008 through injury. Again the season Briscoe proved he is one of the most consistent performers in super league, his displays and bravery gained praise from John Kear and Justin Morgan. He made his Hull Kingston Rovers début against Leeds which Hull KR narrowly lost 20–12. However he scored his first try for the Robins a week later at home to St. Helens in a thrilling 24–22 victory. In 2009 he scored his first hat trick for the club in an away 46–28 win at Castleford. Some brilliant performances throughout 2009 made sure that he was England Rugby League full back for Four Nations campaign. Shaun's 50th appearance came on the opening day of the 2010 Super League season, which Rovers won 30–12 against Salford.

=== Widnes Vikings ===
Briscoe spent two seasons with Widnes before retiring in 2013.

== International career ==
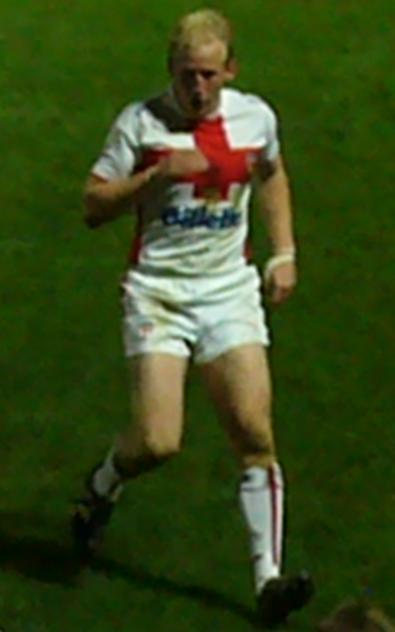
Briscoe playing for England in 2008

Briscoe played for England against New Zealand at Brentford in November 2002. He was also selected for the sides to face Fiji and Tonga and made three appearances.

In 2003 he was selected for England A to play against Australia and play in the European Nations Cup. He won the Jean Galia Medal as man of the match in the final.

He was named in the England team to face Wales at the Keepmoat Stadium, Doncaster, prior to England's departure for the 2008 Rugby League World Cup.

He was selected to play for England against France in the one-off test in 2010.

=== Honours ===
Shaun Briscoe won caps for England while at Hull in 2004 against Russia, France and Ireland (sub); while at Hull Kingston Rovers in 2008 against Wales; in 2009 against France, and in the 2009 Rugby League Four Nations against France, Australia, New Zealand and Australia.
