= 1920–21 Yorkshire Cup =

- Structure: Regional knockout championship
- Teams: 13
- Winners: Hull Kingston Rovers
- Runners-up: Hull

The 1920–21 Yorkshire Cup was the thirteenth occasion on which the Yorkshire Cup competition was held. This year saw a new name on the trophy, when previously twice beaten finalists (1906 and 1911), Hull Kingston Rovers, won the trophy on the third attempt by beating close neighbours and fierce rivals Hull F.C. by a score of 2–0 in the final. The match was played at Headingley, Leeds, now in West Yorkshire. The attendance was 20,000 and receipts were £1,926. This was the first of only three meetings between the teams which would take place in the finals in the long history of the tournament

== Background ==
The Rugby Football League's Yorkshire Cup competition was a knock-out competition between (mainly professional) rugby league clubs from the county of Yorkshire. The actual area was at times increased to encompass other teams from outside the county such as Newcastle, Mansfield, Coventry, and even London (in the form of Acton & Willesden.

The rugby league season always (until the onset of "summer rugby" in 1996) ran from around August through around May. This competition always took place early in the season, in the autumn, with the final taking place in (or just before) December. The only exception to this was when disruption of the fixture list occurred during, and immediately after, the two world wars.

== Competition and results ==
This season there were no junior/amateur clubs taking part, no new entrants and no "leavers", so the total of entries remained the same, at thirteen. This in turn resulted in three byes in the first round.

=== Round 1 ===
Round 1 involved five matches (with three byes) and 13 clubs.

Game no.	Fixture date	Home team	Score	Away team	Venue	Ref
1	Sat 16 Oct 1920	Batley	10–3	York	Mount Pleasant	
2	Sat 16 Oct 1920	Halifax	15–3	Bramley	Thrum Hall	
3	Sat 16 Oct 1920	Huddersfield	5–5	Dewsbury	Fartown	
4	Sat 16 Oct 1920	Hull Kingston Rovers	12–3	Bradford Northern	Craven Street (off Holderness Road)	
5	Sat 16 Oct 1920	Leeds	14–2	Wakefield Trinity	Headingley	
6		Hull		bye		
7		Hunslet		bye		
8		Keighley		bye		

=== Round 1 – replays ===
Round 1's replays involved one match and two clubs.

Game no.	Fixture date	Home team	Score	Away team	Venue	Ref
R	Tue 19 Oct 1920	Dewsbury	7–0	Huddersfield	Crown Flatt	

=== Round 2 – quarterfinals ===
Round 2's quarterfinals involved four matches and eight clubs.

Game no.	Fixture date	Home team	Score	Away team	Venue	Ref
1	Sat 30 Oct 1920	Dewsbury	3–2	Halifax	Crown Flatt (Note: The attendance of 26584 was a never to be bettered ground record.)	
2	Sat 30 Oct 1920	Hunslet	10–9	Batley	Parkside	
3	Sat 30 Oct 1920	Keighley	5–18	Hull	Lawkholme Lane	
4	Sat 30 Oct 1920	Leeds	2–8	Hull Kingston Rovers	Headingley	

=== Round 3 – semifinals ===
Round 3's semifinals involved two matches and four clubs.

Game no.	Fixture date	Home team	Score	Away team	Venue	Ref
1	Sat 13 Nov 1920	Hull	31–5	Hunslet	Boulevard	
2	Sat 13 Nov 1920	Hull Kingston Rovers	8–5	Dewsbury	Craven Street (off Holderness Road)	

=== Final ===
Game no.	Fixture date	Home team	Score	Away team	Venue	Att	Rec	Ref
	Saturday 27 November 1920	Hull Kingston Rovers	2–0	Hull	Headingley (Note: Headingley is the home ground of Leeds RLFC with a capacity of 21,000. The record attendance was 40,175 for a league match between Leeds and Bradford Northern on 21 May 1947.)	20000	£1,926	

==== Teams and scorers ====
Hull Kingston Rovers	No.	Hull
	Teams	
Laurie Osborne	1	Ned Rogers
Billy Bradshaw	2	Alfred Francis
J. Cook	3	Billy Stone
Gilbert Austin	4	Billy Batten
Louis Harris	5	Jack Holdsworth
W. Clark	6	Eddie Caswell
Tommy McGeiver	7	Tommy Milner
J. H. Wilkinson	8	H. Taylor
J. R. Wilkinson	9	H. Henson
Frank Bielby	10	Jack Beasty
R. Boagey	11	Bob Taylor
Frank Gibson	12	Danny Wyburn
Arthur Moore	13	Jim Kennedy
William 'Billy' Jacques	Coach	Sid Melville (trainer)
2	Score	0
0	HT	0
	Scorers	
	Goals	
	G	
Bill Bradshaw	Drop goals	
Referee		unknown

Scoring – Try = three (3) points – Goal = two (2) points – Drop goal = two (2) points

=== The road to success ===
First round
Leeds	14
Wakefield Trinity	2
Hull Kingston Rovers	12
Bradford Northern	3
Huddersfield	5 (0)
Dewsbury	5 (7)
Halifax	15
Bramley	3
Keighley
bye
Hull
bye
Hunslet
bye
Batley	10
York	3

Second round
Leeds	2
Hull Kingston Rovers	8
Dewsbury	3
Halifax	2
Keighley	5
Hull	18
Hunslet	10
Batley	9

Semifinals
Hull Kingston Rovers	8
Dewsbury	5
Hull	31
Hunslet	5

Final
Hull Kingston Rovers	2
Hull	0

== See also ==
- 1920–21 Northern Rugby Football Union season
- Rugby league county cups
