= 2012 Hull Kingston Rovers season =

- Super League XVII Rank
- Challenge Cup
- 2012 record: Wins: 5; draws: 1; losses: 6
- Points scored: For: 294; against: 296

Team information
- Chairman: Neil Hudgell
- Head coach: Craig Sandercock
- Captain: Ben Galea
- Stadium: New Craven Park
- Avg. attendance: 7,369
- High attendance: 7,616
| ← 2011 | 2013 → |

In 2012, Hull Kingston Rovers competed in the 17th season of the Super League and also in the 2012 Challenge Cup. Last season they finished in the top eight before losing in the playoffs.

== Background ==
Hull Kingston Rovers enter the 2012 season on the back of a good performance in 2011. They finished in 7th position on the competition table which qualified them for the playoffs before they were eliminated in the first rounds by the Catalans Dragons. However, Hull KR have lost much experience from their team over the off season. Key personnel losses included former coach Justin Morgan, who had helped Hull KR to get promoted to the Super League and the retirement of captain Mick Vella. Other key losses include Peter Fox, Clint Newton and Shaun Briscoe.

Craig Sandercock, who had been assistant at the Newcastle Knights was announced as the new coach in September 2011. Several players were signed to replace those who had left. These included former England player David Hodgson, Ryan O'Hara, Shannon McDonnell and Tongan international Mickey Paea. Injuries have also affected Hull KR with the loss of new captain Ben Galea and their 2011 player of the season Blake Green for much of the season.

Because of the loss of players, Hull Kingston Rovers prospects were not rated highly for 2012. Dave Woods, writer for the BBC said that " If they make the top eight, then you'd have to say "top achievement". But I reckon a year of relative struggle could be in store." They were given the 9th best odds to win the competition out of the 14 teams in the Super League.

== 2012 squad ==
2012 Hull Kingston Rovers season
| First team squad | | | Coaching staff |
|---|---|---|---|
| 1 Shannon McDonnell – FB; 2 Craig Hall – WG; 3 Kris Welham – CE; 4 Jake Webster – CE; 5 David Hodgson – WG; 6 Blake Green – SO; 7 Michael Dobson – SH; 8 Joel Clinton – PR; 9 Josh Hodgson – HK; 10 Scott Taylor – PR; 11 Constantine Mika – SR; 12 Ben Galea – SR (c); 13 Rhys Lovegrove – LF, SR | 14 Lincoln Withers – HK; 15 Liam Watts – PR; 16 Jason Netherton – SR; 17 Ryan O'Hara – PR; 18 Graeme Horne – SR, CE; 19 Scott Murrell – HK, LF; 20 Jordan Cox – SR, PR; 21 Sam Latus – WG; 22 Scott Wheeldon – PR; 23 Mickey Paea – PR; 24 Richard Beaumont – SR; 25 Keale Carlile – HK; 26 George Griffin – WG | 27 Louis Sheriff – PR, FB; 28 Dave Petersen – LF; 29 Liam Salter – CE; 30 Aaron Ollett – HK; 31 Nick Johnson – PR; 32 Chris Heil – SR; 33 James Green – LF | Head coach: Craig Sandercock; Assistant coach: Chris Chester; Legend: (c) Captain(s); (vc) Vice-captain(s) |

== 2012 transfers ==
Ins

| Name | Signed From | Contract Length | Date |
| Ryan O'Hara | Crusaders | 2 Years | September 2011 |
| David Hodgson | Huddersfield Giants | 2 Years | September 2011 |
| Graeme Horne | Huddersfield Giants | 2 Years | September 2011 |
| George Griffin | Queanbeyan Kangaroos | 2 Years | September 2011 |
| Lincoln Withers | Crusaders | 2 Years | September 2011 |
| Mickey Paea | Canterbury Bulldogs | 2 Years | October 2011 |
| Keale Carlile | Huddersfield Giants | 2 Years | October 2011 |
| Constantine Mika | Newcastle Knights | 2 Years | October 2011 |
| Shannon McDonnell | Newcastle Knights | 1 Year | November 2011 |

Outs

| Name | Sold To | Contract Length | Date |
| Peter Fox | Wakefield Trinity Wildcats | 3 Years | July 2011 |
| Shaun Briscoe | Widnes Vikings | 2 Years | August 2011 |
| Liam Colbon | Harlequins RL | 2 Years | September 2011 |
| Clint Newton | Penrith Panthers | 2 Years | September 2011 |
| Matt Cook | Harlequins RL | 2 Years | September 2011 |
| Michael Vella | Retired | | September 2011 |
| Ben Cockayne | Wakefield Trinity Wildcats | 1 Year | October 2011 |
| Ben Fisher | Batley Bulldogs | 1 Year | December 2011 |

== Season summary ==
=== February ===
Hull KR opened the season by losing 34–16 on the opening day of the season to last season's champions Leeds Rhinos. The scoreline flattered Leeds who were able to pull away in the last 15 minutes of the match. The first win of the season came the next week when they defeated Wakefield 22–10 away from home. However, the victory came at a cost with scrum half Michael Dobson suffering a shoulder injury.

== Fixtures and results ==
LEGEND
| Win |
| Draw |
| Loss |

| Date | Competition | Rnd | Vrs | H/A | Venue | Result | Score | Tries | Goals | Att | Live on TV | Report |
|---|---|---|---|---|---|---|---|---|---|---|---|---|
| 3 February 2012 | Super League XVII | 1 | Leeds | A | Headingley | L | 16–34 | Horne (2), Welham, Hodgson | | 15,343 | | Report |
| 12 February 2012 | Super League XVII | 2 | Wakefield Trinity | A | Belle Vue | W | 22–10 | Paea, Mika, Hodgson, Lovegrove | Dobson 2, Hall | 8,612 | | Report |
| 19 February 2012 | Super League XVII | 3 | St Helens R.F.C. | H | Craven Park | D | 36–36 | Welham, J Hodgson, D Hodgson, McDonnell, Mika 2 | Hall 6 | 7,610 | | Match Report |
| 26 February 2012 | Super League XVII | 4 | Warrington | A | Halliwell Jones | L | 10–42 | Hall, Lovegrove | Dobson | 11,916 | – | Match Report |
| 4 March 2012 | Super League XVII | 5 | Widnes | H | Craven Park | W | 36–0 | Murrell, Hall 2, Withers, J Hodgson, Webster | Dobson 6 | 7,423 | – | Match Report |
| 10 March 2012 | Super League XVII | 6 | Bradford | H | Craven Park | L | 24–36 | Paea, Hall, Welham, J Hodgson | Dobson 4 | 7,486 | – | Match Report |
| 17 March 2012 | Super League XVII | 7 | Catalans Dragons | A | Stade Gilbert Brutus | L | 12–20 | Dobson, Welham | Dobson 2 | 7,337 | | Match Report |
| 25 March 2012 | Super League XVII | 8 | Huddersfield | H | Craven Park | W | 40–22 | Paea, Watts, Taylor, Welham, J Hodgson, D Hodgson, Latus | Dobson 6 | 7,616 | | Match Report |
| 30 March 2012 | Super League XVII | 9 | Castleford | A | Wheldon Road | L | 30–34 | Welham 3, Withers, J Hodgson | Dobson 5 | 6,396 | | Match Report |
| 6 April 2012 | Super League XVII | 10 | Hull | A | KC Stadium | L | 6–36 | Hall | Dobson | 18,979 | Sky Sports | Match Report |
| 9 April 2012 | Super League XVII | 11 | Salford | A | Salford City Stadium | W | 18–10 | Taylor 2, Withers | Dobson 3 | 5,000 | | Match Report |
| 22 April 2012 | Super League XVII | 12 | London Broncos | H | Craven Park | W | 44–16 | Welham 2, Green, Horne, D Hodgson 3 | Dobson 8 | 6,713 | | Match Report |
| 0/0/12 | Super League XVII | 13 | Team | H/A | Venue | W/D/L | Score | Try Scorers | Goal Scorers | Attendance | TV | Match Report |
| 0/0/12 | Super League XVII | 14 | Team | H/A | Venue | W/D/L | Score | Try Scorers | Goal Scorers | Attendance | TV | Match Report |
| 0/0/12 | Super League XVII | 15 | Team | H/A | Venue | W/D/L | Score | Try Scorers | Goal Scorers | Attendance | TV | Match Report |
| 0/0/12 | Super League XVII | 16 | Team | H/A | Venue | W/D/L | Score | Try Scorers | Goal Scorers | Attendance | TV | Match Report |
| 0/0/12 | Super League XVII | 17 | Team | H/A | Venue | W/D/L | Score | Try Scorers | Goal Scorers | Attendance | TV | Match Report |
| 0/0/12 | Super League XVII | 18 | Team | H/A | Venue | W/D/L | Score | Try Scorers | Goal Scorers | Attendance | TV | Match Report |
| 0/0/12 | Super League XVII | 19 | Team | H/A | Venue | W/D/L | Score | Try Scorers | Goal Scorers | Attendance | TV | Match Report |
| 0/0/12 | Super League XVII | 20 | Team | H/A | Venue | W/D/L | Score | Try Scorers | Goal Scorers | Attendance | TV | Match Report |
| 0/0/12 | Super League XVII | 21 | Team | H/A | Venue | W/D/L | Score | Try Scorers | Goal Scorers | Attendance | TV | Match Report |
| 0/0/12 | Super League XVII | 22 | Team | H/A | Venue | W/D/L | Score | Try Scorers | Goal Scorers | Attendance | TV | Match Report |
| 0/0/12 | Super League XVII | 23 | Team | H/A | Venue | W/D/L | Score | Try Scorers | Goal Scorers | Attendance | TV | Match Report |
| 0/0/12 | Super League XVII | 24 | Team | H/A | Venue | W/D/L | Score | Try Scorers | Goal Scorers | Attendance | TV | Match Report |
| 0/0/12 | Super League XVII | 25 | Team | H/A | Venue | W/D/L | Score | Try Scorers | Goal Scorers | Attendance | TV | Match Report |
| 0/0/12 | Super League XVII | 26 | Team | H/A | Venue | W/D/L | Score | Try Scorers | Goal Scorers | Attendance | TV | Match Report |
| 0/0/12 | Super League XVII | 27 | Team | H/A | Venue | W/D/L | Score | Try Scorers | Goal Scorers | Attendance | TV | Match Report |

Super League XVII
| Pos | Team | Pld | W | D | L | PF | PA | PD | Pts | Qualification |
|---|---|---|---|---|---|---|---|---|---|---|
| 1 | Wigan Warriors (L) | 27 | 21 | 0 | 6 | 994 | 449 | +545 | 42 | Play-offs |
| 2 | Warrington Wolves | 27 | 20 | 1 | 6 | 909 | 539 | +370 | 41 | Play-offs |
| 3 | St Helens | 27 | 17 | 2 | 8 | 795 | 480 | +315 | 36 | Play-offs |
| 4 | Catalans Dragons | 27 | 18 | 0 | 9 | 812 | 611 | +201 | 36 | Play-offs |
| 5 | Leeds Rhinos (C) | 27 | 16 | 0 | 11 | 823 | 662 | +161 | 32 | Play-offs |
| 6 | Hull F.C. | 27 | 15 | 2 | 10 | 696 | 621 | +75 | 32 | Play-offs |
| 7 | Huddersfield Giants | 27 | 14 | 0 | 13 | 699 | 664 | +35 | 28 | Play-offs |
| 8 | Wakefield Trinity Wildcats | 27 | 13 | 0 | 14 | 633 | 764 | −131 | 26 | Play-offs |
| 9 | Bradford Bulls | 27 | 14 | 1 | 12 | 633 | 756 | −123 | 23 (Note: Bradford Bulls deducted 6 points on 25 July 2012 for entering administration) | |
| 10 | Hull Kingston Rovers | 27 | 10 | 1 | 16 | 753 | 729 | +24 | 21 | |
| 11 | Salford City Reds | 27 | 8 | 1 | 18 | 618 | 844 | −226 | 17 | |
| 12 | London Broncos | 27 | 7 | 0 | 20 | 588 | 890 | −302 | 14 | |
| 13 | Castleford Tigers | 27 | 6 | 0 | 21 | 554 | 948 | −394 | 12 | |
| 14 | Widnes Vikings | 27 | 6 | 0 | 21 | 532 | 1082 | −550 | 12 | |

Source: superleague.co.uk and BBC Sport.
Rules for classification: 1st on competition points; 2nd on match points difference.
Competition points: for win = 2; for draw = 1; for loss = 0.
(C) Champions; (L) League Leaders' Shield Winners
