= Thomas Milner =

Thomas, Tom or Tommy Milner may refer to:

- Thomas Milner (physician) (1719–1797), English physician
- Thomas Milner (politician) (died 1694), English emigrant to the Virginia colony
- Tommy Milner (born 1986), American racing driver
- Tommy Milner (rugby league) (fl. 1910s), English rugby league player
- Tom Milner Racing, drivers including Brian Bonner and Jeff Davis
- Tom Milner, actor in Waterloo Road (TV series)

== See also ==
- Thomas Milner Gibson (1806–1884), British politician
