= 2011 Hull Kingston Rovers season =

- Super League XV Rank: 7th
- Challenge Cup: Quarter final
- 2011 record: Wins: 0; draws: 0; losses: 0
- Points scored: For: 0; against: 0

Team information
- Chairman: Neil Hudgell
- Head coach: Justin Morgan
- Captain: Mick Vella
- Stadium: New Craven Park
← 2010	2012 →

In 2011, Hull Kingston Rovers competed in the 16th season of the Super League and also in the 2011 Challenge Cup. Hull Kingston Rovers made the playoffs only to be knocked out by the Catalans Dragons in the first round.

== 2011 transfers ==
Ins

Name	Signed From	Fee	Date
Willie Mason	Sydney Roosters		September 2010
Blake Green	Canterbury Bulldogs		September 2010
Craig Hall	Hull F.C.		September 2010

Outs

Name	Sold To	Fee	Date
Chev Walker	Bradford Bulls		October 2010
David Mills			October 2010

== 2011 squad ==
No.	Player	Apps	Tries	Goals	DGs	Points
1	Shaun Briscoe	24	5	0	0	20
2	Peter Fox	20	7	0	0	28
3	Kris Welham	31	26	1	0	106
4	Jake Webster	25	12	0	0	48
5	Liam Colbon	14	6	0	0	24
6	Blake Green	29	14	0	0	56
7	Michael Dobson	23	7	91	4	214
8	Rhys Lovegrove	23	1	0	0	4
9	Ben Fisher	28	3	0	0	12
10	Joel Clinton	14	0	0	0	0
11	Clint Newton	19	8	0	0	32
12	Ben Galea	31	13	0	0	52
13	Scott Murrell	29	5	9	0	38
14	Liam Watts	20	2	0	0	8
15	Scott Wheeldon	21	0	0	0	0
16	Jason Netherton	22	0	0	0	0
17	Matt Cook	10	5	0	0	20
18	Josh Hodgson	31	2	0	0	8
19	Craig Hall	14	7	16	0	60
20	Michael Vella	26	2	0	0	8
21	Sam Latus	14	6	0	0	24
22	Scott Taylor	22	2	0	0	8
23	Willie Mason	6	1	0	0	4
24	Richard Beaumont	2	0	0	0	0
26	Louis Sheriff	3	2	0	0	8
27	Jordan Cox	7	2	0	0	8
28	Ben Cockayne	19	6	0	0	24

== Coaching team ==
Staff Name	Position	Previous club
Phil Lowe	Football Director	
Sarah Smith	Football Manager	
Justin Morgan	Head coach	Toulouse Olympique
Chris Chester	Assistant coach	Castleford Tigers

== Fixtures and results ==
Pos	Team	Pld	W	D	L	PF	PA	PD	Pts	Qualification
1	Warrington Wolves (L)	27	22	0	5	1072	401	+671	44	Play-offs
2	Wigan Warriors	27	20	3	4	852	432	+420	43	Play-offs
3	St Helens	27	17	3	7	782	515	+267	37	Play-offs
4	Huddersfield Giants	27	16	0	11	707	524	+183	32	Play-offs
5	Leeds Rhinos (C)	27	15	1	11	757	603	+154	31	Play-offs
6	Catalans Dragons	27	15	1	11	689	626	+63	31	Play-offs
7	Hull Kingston Rovers	27	14	0	13	713	692	+21	28	Play-offs
8	Hull F.C.	27	13	1	13	718	569	+149	27	Play-offs
9	Castleford Tigers	27	12	2	13	664	808	−144	26	
10	Bradford Bulls	27	9	2	16	570	826	−256	20	
11	Salford City Reds	27	10	0	17	542	809	−267	20	
12	Harlequins	27	6	1	20	524	951	−427	13	
13	Wakefield Trinity Wildcats	27	7	0	20	453	957	−504	10 (Note: Wakefield deducted 4 points for entering administration.)	
14	Crusaders	27	6	0	21	527	857	−330	8 (Note: Crusaders deducted 4 points for entering administration.)	

Source: rugbyleagueproject.org
Rules for classification: 1) Points; 2) Points difference; 3) Number of points scored;
(C) Champions; (L) League Leaders' Shield winners

=== Super League Fixtures ===
Competition	Round	Opponent	Result	Score	Home/Away	Venue	Attendance	Date
Super League XVI	1	Hull F.C.	Win	22–34	Magic Millennium	Millennium Stadium	29,323	Sunday 13 February 2011
Super League XVI	2	Warrington Wolves	Loss	24–22	Away	Halliwell Jones Stadium	10,899	Sunday 20 February 2011
Super League XVI	3	Catalans Dragons	Loss	18–31	Home	MS3 Craven Park	8,092	Sunday 27 February 2011
Super League XVI	4	Castleford Tigers	Loss	27–14	Away	PROBIZ Coliseum	8,537	Sunday 6 March 2011
Super League XVI	5	Celtic Crusaders	Win	40–22	Home	MS3 Craven Park	8,602	Sunday 13 March 2011
Super League XVI	6	Salford City Reds	Loss	34–18	Away	The Willows	4,408	Friday 18 March 2011
Super League XVI	7	Huddersfield Giants	Loss	16–38	Home	MS3 Craven Park	7,502	Saturday 26 March 2011
Super League XVI	8	St. Helens	Loss	34–16	Away	Stobart Stadium Halton	7,740	Friday 1 April 2011
Super League XVI	9	Leeds Rhinos	Win	38–28	Home	MS3 Craven Park	8,673	Saturday 9 April 2011
Super League XVI	10	Wigan Warriors	Loss	16–28	Home	MS3 Craven Park	8,703	Friday 15 April 2011
Super League XVI	11	Hull F.C.	Loss	36–18	Away	KC Stadium	19,754	Friday 22 April 2011
Super League XVI	12	Harlequins	Win	37–24	Home	MS3 Craven Park	7,139	Monday 25 April 2011
Super League XVI	13	Wakefield Trinity Wildcats	Loss	26–24	Away	Rapid Solicitors Stadium	7,283	Sunday 1 May 2011
Super League XVI	14	Bradford Bulls	Win	46–18	Home	MS3 Craven Park	7,923	Sunday 15 May 2011
Super League XVI	15	Wigan Warriors	Loss	40–6	Away	DW Stadium	14,779	Monday 30 May 2011
Super League XVI	16	Hull F.C.	Win	17–10	Home	MS3 Craven Park	10,250	Sunday 5 June 2011
Super League XVI	17	Leeds Rhinos	Loss	44–14	Away	Headingley Carnegie Stadium	13,669	Sunday 12 June 2011
Super League XVI	18	Warrington Wolves	Loss	16–46	Home	MS3 Craven Park	8,143	Sunday 19 June 2011
Super League XVI	19	Harlequins	Win	0–34	Away	Twickenham Stoop Stadium	2,927	Saturday 25 June 2011
Super League XVI	20	Wakefield Trinity Wildcats	Win	70–14	Home	MS3 Craven Park	8,025	Sunday 3 July 2011
Super League XVI	21	Celtic Crusaders	Win	10–38	Away	The Racecourse Ground	2,820	Saturday 9 July 2011
Super League XVI	22	Salford City Reds	Win	21–8	Home	The Willows	7,834	Sunday 17 July 2011
Super League XVI	23	Huddersfield Giants	Loss	46–26	Away	Galpharm Stadium	6,464	Saturday 30 July 2011
Super League XVI	24	Bradford Bulls	Win	8–34	Away	Odsal Stadium	13,441	Sunday 14 August 2011
Super League XVI	25	St. Helens	Win	24–22	Home	MS3 Craven Park	8,356	Sunday 21 August 2011
Super League XVI	26	Catalans Dragons	Win	28–30	Away	Stade Gilbert Brutus	8,252	Saturday 3 September 2011
Super League XVI	27	Castleford Tigers	Win	26–24	Home	MS3 Craven Park	8,936	Saturday 10 September 2011
