= 1996 RFL Division Two =

RFL Division Two
- League: Rugby Football League Division Two
- Duration: 22 Rounds
- Teams: 12

1996 Season
- Champions: Hull Kingston Rovers

The 1996 Division Two Championship season was the third tier of British rugby league during the 1996 season, and was also the first season of rugby league to be played in the summer. The competition featured all eleven teams from the 1995–96 Rugby Football League season and an additional newly formed club, South Wales.

== Championship ==
The league was won by Hull Kingston Rovers for a second successive season, winning promotion to Division One along with runners-up Swinton Lions.

=== League table ===
	Team	Pld	W	D	L	PF	PA	Pts
1	Hull Kingston Rovers	22	21	0	1	1009	294	42
2	Swinton Lions	22	18	0	4	785	295	36
3	Hunslet Hawks	22	18	0	4	730	326	36
4	Carlisle	22	13	0	9	654	486	26
5	Doncaster	22	13	0	9	500	540	26
6	South Wales	22	12	0	10	528	548	24
7	Leigh Centurions	22	10	0	12	594	510	20
8	York Wasps	22	9	0	13	449	603	18
9	Chorley Chieftains	22	6	0	16	354	723	12
10	Barrow Braves	22	5	0	17	354	651	10
11	Bramley	22	5	0	17	360	759	10
12	Prescot Panthers	22	2	0	20	301	883	4

Champions	Promoted

== Statistics ==
The following are the top points scorers in Division Two during the 1996 season. Statistics are for league matches only.

Most tries

Player	Team	Tries
Gary Atkins	Hull Kingston Rovers	26
Stanley Gene	Hull Kingston Rovers	26
David Plange	Hunslet Hawks	25
Jason Roach	Swinton Lions	24
Mark Riley	Swinton Lions	23
David Ingram	Leigh Centurions	21
Rob D'Arcy	Hull Kingston Rovers	19
Mick Coult	Doncaster Dragons	17
Danny Russell	Carlisle	17
Simon Ashcroft	Swinton Lions	14
Andy Currier	South Wales	14
Tane Manihera	Carlisle	14
Shaun Marshall	South Wales	14

Most goals

Player	Team	Goals
Mike Fletcher	Hull Kingston Rovers	143
Greg Pearce	Swinton Lions	107
Willie Richardson	Carlisle	100
Simon Wilson	Hunslet Hawks	93
Dean Purtill	Leigh Centurions	90
Phil Atkinson	Barrow Braves	57
Tony Chappell	Doncaster Dragons	52
Dean Creasser	Bramley	51
Terry Smirk	York Wasps	50
Ioan Bebb	South Wales	45

Most points

Player	Team	Tries	Goals	DGs	Points
Mike Fletcher	Hull Kingston Rovers	4	143	0	302
Willie Richardson	Carlisle	9	100	0	236
Greg Pearce	Swinton Lions	4	107	0	230
Dean Purtill	Leigh Centurions	11	90	0	224
Simon Wilson	Hunslet Hawks	7	93	1	215
Phil Atkinson	Barrow Braves	11	57	1	159
Tony Chappell	Doncaster Dragons	7	52	3	135
Terry Smirk	York Wasps	6	50	2	126
Ioan Bebb	South Wales	7	45	0	118
Dean Creasser	Bramley	3	51	0	114

== See also ==
- Super League war
- 1996 Challenge Cup
