= David Page =

David Page (and those similarly spelled) may refer to:

- David Page (geologist) (1814–1879), Scottish science writer
- David Page (musician) (1960–2016), Indigenous Australian music director
- David Page (1943/4–2024), British journalist and historian
- David C. Page (born 1956), American professor of biology
- David Perkins Page (1810–1848), American educator and writer, first head of the New York State Normal School
- Dave Page (born 1939), American former history professor, now cobbler
- David R. Paige (1844–1901), U.S. Representative
