= South Wales RLFC =

South Wales RLFC was the official name of two different Welsh rugby league football sides:-

- South Wales RLFC (1995 to 1996)
- South Wales Scorpions (2009–2017), South Wales Ironmen (2017), then West Wales Raiders (2018–)
