= Andrew Carmichael =

English rugby league footballer & middleweight boxer

Personal information
- Full name: Andrew Carmichael
- Born: c. first ¼ 1902 Kingston upon Hull district, England
- Died: c. fourth ¼ 1963 (aged 61) Holderness district, England

Playing information
- Position: Stand-off, Loose forward
Club
Years	Team	Pld	T	G	FG	P
1923–29	Hull Kingston Rovers	78	15	1	0	47
1929–39	Hull FC
	Total	78	15	1	0	47

Andrew "Andy" Carmichael (c. first ¼ 1902 – c. fourth ¼ 1963) was an English professional rugby league footballer who played in the 1920s and 1930s, and middleweight professional boxer of the 1920s. He played at club level for Hull Kingston Rovers and Hull FC, as a stand-off or loose forward, and was a director at Hull FC from 1939 to 1946.

== Background ==
Andrew Carmichael's birth was registered in Kingston upon Hull district, East Riding of Yorkshire, England, he was a fruit broker/importer on Humber Street, Kingston upon Hull c. 1938–c. 1946, he lived at 129 Porter Street, Kingston upon Hull c. 1925, he lived at Willerby Road, Kingston upon Hull c. 1946, and his death aged 61 was registered in Holderness district, East Riding of Yorkshire, England.

== Playing career ==
=== Challenge Cup Final appearances ===
Andrew Carmichael played loose forward in Hull Kingston Rovers' 3–16 defeat by Oldham in the 1924–25 Challenge Cup Final during the 1924–25 season at Headingley, Leeds on Saturday 25 April 1925, in front of a crowd of 28,335.

== Club career ==
Andrew Carmichael was transferred from Hull Kingston Rovers to Hull F.C. on 30 January 1929.
