= Hoult =

Hoult is a surname. Notable people with the surname include:

- Colin Hoult (born 1979), British comedy actor and writer
- Jack Hoult (c.1901–1974), English rugby league footballer
- Joseph Hoult (1847–1917), British ship-owner and Member of Parliament for Wirral 1900–1906
- Nicholas Hoult (born 1989), English actor
- Norah Hoult (1898–1984), Irish novelist and short story writer
- Russell Hoult (born 1972), English footballer
