= 1924–25 Challenge Cup =

Rugby league competition

- Duration: 5 rounds
- Number of teams: 32
- Winners: Oldham
- Runners-up: Hull Kingston Rovers
- Biggest home win: 116–0 Wigan v Flimby & Fothergill; 1st round
- Biggest away win: 74–5 St Helens Recs v Dalton; 2nd round

The 1924–25 Challenge Cup was the 25th staging of rugby league's oldest knockout competition, the Challenge Cup.

== First round ==
The draw for the first round of the competition was made on 21 January 1925 and brought together the 27 teams of the rugby league joined by 5 junior clubs. The junior clubs involved in the tournament were Barnsley United of Hull, Twelve Apostles of Leigh, Castleford (who were to join the league in 1926), Dalton from Dalton-in-Furness, Lancashire and Flimby and Fothergill from Cumberland.

Twelve Apostles were drawn at home but ceded home advantage to Leeds as this would generate greater gate receipts. Ties were to be played on Saturday 14 February but the game between Keighley and Dewsbury was postponed due to the pitch at Lawkholme Lane being waterlogged. The tie was played on Wednesday 18 February

Home	Score	Away	Referee
Barnsley United	3–3	Dalton	W. Wood
Broughton Rangers	0–8	Huddersfield	F. Renton
Halifax	0–0	Featherstone Rovers	C. Jameson
Hull Kingston Rovers	9–0	Bramley	C. Denham
Hunslet	25–0	Castleford	B. R. Ennion
Leigh	0–5	Oldham	H. Horsfall
Rochdale Hornets	7–0	Barrow	H. Swift
St Helens Recs	15–5	Hull F.C.	A. Brown
Swinton	2–3	Batley	R. Robinson
Leeds	27–0	Twelve Apostles	J. Edden
Wakefield Trinity	14–3	Salford	F. Fairhurst
Warrington	11–3	Bradford Northern	W. Cross
Widnes	10–8	St Helens	T. Johnson
Wigan	116–0	Flimby & Fothergill	H. Cooper
York	3–8	Wigan Highfield	R. Jones
Keighley	4–0	Dewsbury	F. Mills

Wigan's victory against Flimby & Fothergill set records for the Wigan club that still stand in 2018, the score was the club's biggest victory and Jim Sullivan's kicking 22 goals and his points total of 44 set an individual record for a Wigan player. Sullivan's 22 goals (out of 22 attempts) also remains a record for any player in the Challenge Cup.

=== Replays ===
Both drawn games were replayed on 18 February 2018.

Home	Score	Away	Referee
Dalton	3–2	Barnsley United	F. Renton
Featherstone Rovers	2–2	Halifax	C. Jameson

The Halifax v Featherstone tie required a second replay which was played at a neutral venue, Headingley, Leeds, on Monday 23 February. The tie had taken fours hours of play to resolve but no tries had been scored as all the points came from kicked goals.

Home	Score	Away	Referee
Halifax	2–6	Featherstone Rovers	C. Jameson

== Second round ==
The second round had been drawn on 16 February before three of the first round ties had been resolved, with the ties to be played on Saturday 28 February.

Home	Score	Away	Referee
Batley	30–3	Widnes	F. Mills
Dalton	5–74	St Helens Recs	H. Swift
Featherstone Rovers	6–2	Hunslet	F. Fairhurst
Hull Kingston Rovers	13–5	Wigan Highfield	W. Wood
Keighley	3–0	Wakefield Trinity	C. Jameson
Leeds	2–0	Wigan	R. Jones
Oldham	12–7	Wolves	A. Brown
Rochdale Hornets	5–0	Huddersfield	R. Robinson

== Third round ==
The third round was drawn on Monday 2 March with ties to be played on 14 March.

Home	Score	Away	Referee
Batley	4–5	Leeds	F. Fairhurst
Keighley	0–5	Hull Kingston Rovers	R. Jones
Oldham	26–0	Featherstone Rovers	R. Robinson
Rochdale Hornets	9–5	St Helens Recs	A. Brown

== Semi-finals ==
The draw for the semi-finals was made on Monday 16 March 1925 and produced a Yorkshire derby and a Lancashire derby. Both games were played at neutral venues on 4 April.

Team 1	Score	Team 2	Venue	Referee	Attendance	Receipts
Leeds	6–7	Hull Kingston Rovers	Belle Vue, Wakefield	C. Jameson	25,263	£2,115 18s
Oldham	9–0	Rochdale Hornets	Central Park, Wigan	H. Horsfall	26,208	£1,853 12s 2d

== Final ==
The week after the semi-finals, the Rugby League Council announced that the final would be played at Headingley, Leeds on Saturday 25 April 1925. The match referee was to be R. Jones with F. Fairhurst and W. K. Hirst as the touch judges.

25 April 1925
3:00 pm

Oldham R.L.F.C.	16 – 3	Hull Kingston Rovers
Tries Farrar, Brough, Corsi, Davies; Goals Farrar (2)	Report	Tries J. H. Wilkinson

Headingley, Leeds
Attendance: 28,335
Referee: R. Jones (Widnes)

Oldham	Position	Hull Kingston Rovers
E. Knapman	Fullback	L. Osbourne (c)
R. Farrar	Threequarters	L. Harris
S. Rix	Threequarters	J. Cooke
E. Davies	Threequarters	J. Hoult
J. Corsi	Threequarters	G. Austin
G. Hesketh	Halfbacks	J. Raynor
D. Benyon	Halfbacks	J. McIntyre
A. Tomkins	Forwards	J. H. Wilkinson
R. Marlow	Forwards	F. Boagey
J. Collins	Forwards	J. R. Wilkinson
R. Sloman	Forwards	C. W. Westerdale
A. Brough	Forwards	F. Bielby
H. Hilton (c)	Forwards	A. Carmichael

Oldham's win was played before a crowd of 28,335, gate receipts totalled £2,878 10s 9d.

This was Oldham’s fifth appearance in the final, having been losing finalists the previous season and their second win, their previous victory being in 1899. For Hull Kingston Rovers the match was a second appearance in the final, the previous occasion having been in 1905.
