= South Wales RLFC (1995) =

Former rugby league club in Wales

Club information
- Colours: Red, green and white
- Founded: 1995
- Exited: 1997

Former details
- Grounds: Talbot Athletic Ground (3,000); Morfa Stadium (1,200); Cardiff Arms Park (12,500)

South Wales RLFC was a rugby league club formed in 1995. South Wales during their existence played at Morfa Stadium, Swansea, the Talbot Athletic Ground, Aberavon and Cardiff Arms Park.

A team formed in late 2009 also used the name South Wales RLFC before going on to become known as South Wales Scorpions then South Wales Ironmen before moving to West Wales and playing as West Wales Raiders.

== History ==
=== History of rugby league in South Wales ===
The South Wales region had always been an attractive area to the rugby league because of its similarities to Yorkshire and Lancashire in having a mass industrial population which followed rugby enthusiastically. In 1907 a team representing Aberdare was formed, and by 1908-09 there were six Welsh rugby league teams with clubs based in Ebbw Vale, Merthyr Tydfill, Mid Rhondda, Treherbert and Barry. All of these clubs were defunct by 1912. Ebbw Vale survived the longest, five seasons.

Encouraged by the 22,000 strong crowd which attended the Wales vs England match in 1926, local promoters established a club in Pontypridd. The club initially experienced good sized crowds however poor results soon saw attendances drop, and the club only lasted eight games into its second season before folding.

A team was formed in Cardiff and played in the 1947/48 and 1951/52 seasons.

Rugby league would not revisit south Wales until 1981 to 1985 when the Cardiff City Blue Dragons existed as a club. Much like its predecessors initial interest waned when the club suffered from poor results, low attendances and a relocation to Bridgend before they finally disbanded at the end of the 1985 season.

=== South Wales RLFC ===
South Wales RLFC during their first season (1996) in the Rugby Football League were reasonably successful and came fifth in the second division; winning twelve games and losing ten. Games were played at Talbot Athletic Ground Aberavon, one game was played at Morfa Stadium Swansea against Bramley and all the games for the second half of the season were at Cardiff Arms Park. They were coached by Clive Griffiths and assisted by Danny Sheehy.

Initially the club had no playing kit of their own so they borrowed the Welsh international team's kit for the first three games. After that they wore a specially designed plain red strip with the traditional three feathers logo to distinguish them from the national side.

The first home game played at Aberavon on 31 March 1996 saw an attendance of 1,876, when the club played Hull Kingston Rovers and lost 70-8. Crowds fluctuated depending upon where the club played, and the last home game of the season saw a crowd of only 400 witness the club defeating York 20-16 at Cardiff Arms Park.

Due to the relative success of the club and their geographical location outside the heartlands of British rugby league, the club had high hopes that it would be awarded a Super League franchise. A case was put forward by Mike Nicholas and Clive Griffiths and was initially accepted after a 16-11 vote by the RFL council. However at the beginning of September, the RFL Board of Directors refused a final endorsement of a Super League place with a £1 million guarantee of support deemed 'insufficient'. The franchise was then awarded to Gateshead Thunder instead. A meeting a few days later decided to place the South Wales in the second tier of British rugby league, the First Division, but the club decided that this would not be financially viable and the decision was made to disband the club altogether before the start of the 1997 season.

== Players ==
During their first, and only, season South Wales utilised forty-two players.

№	Name	Date of birth (Age)	Début	Position	Appearances	Tries	Goals	Drop goals	Points	Age on Début	Representative	Records/Notes
1	Ioan Bebb	2 September 1970 (age 55)	31 March 1996	Fullback	16	7	45	0	118	25 yrs 6 mths 29 days		Search for "Bebb" at rugbyleagueproject.org
2	Ian Perryment	28 November 1972 (age 52)	31 March 1996	Right wing	12	6	0	0	24	23 yrs 4 mths 3 days		Search for "Perryment" at rugbyleagueproject.org
3	Andy Currier	8 April 1966 (age 59)	31 March 1996	Right-Centre	22	14	0	0	56	29 yrs 11 mths 23 days		
4	Mike Riley	22 November 1970 (age 54)	31 March 1996	Left-Centre	22	7	0	0	28	25 yrs 4 mths 9 days		
5	Sean Marshall	1 June 1968 (age 57)	31 March 1996	Left wing	21	15	0	0	60	27 yrs 9 mths 30 days		Search for "Marshall" at rugbyleagueproject.org
6	David Rees	23 September 1965 (age 60)	31 March 1996	Stand-off	3	1	4	0	12	30 yrs 6 mths 8 days		Search for "Rees" at rugbyleagueproject.org
7	James Churcher	28 May 1973 (age 52)	31 March 1996	Scrum-half	10	2	0	1	9	22 yrs 10 mths 3 days		for "Churcher" at rugbyleagueproject.org
8	Barry Picton	29 April 1972 (age 53)	31 March 1996	Left-Prop	5	0	0	0	0	23 yrs 11 mths 2 days		Search for "Picton" at rugbyleagueproject.org
9	Byron Lloyd	19 April 1970 (age 55)	31 March 1996	Hooker	4	0	0	0	0	25 yrs 11 mths 12 days		Search for "Lloyd" at rugbyleagueproject.org
10	Hugh Waddell	13 November 1958 (age 66)	31 March 1996	Right-Prop	15	1	0	0	4	36 yrs 6 mths 30 days		alternative (incorrect?) date of birth of 1 September 1959 given at walesrugbyleague.co.uk
11	Matthew Taylor	28 April 1973 (age 52)	31 March 1996	Left-Second-row	1	0	0	0	0	22 yrs 11 mths 3 days		Search for "Taylor" at rugbyleagueproject.org
12	Andrew Lippiatt	16 October 1975 (age 50)	31 March 1996	Right-Second-row	5	0	0	0	0	20 yrs 5 mths 15 days		Search for "Lippiatt" at rugbyleagueproject.org
13	Dave Williams	20 May 1967 (age 58)	31 March 1996	Loose forward	9	4	0	0	16	28 yrs 10 mths 11 days	(Wales) Heritage № 376	
14	James Alvis	1 September 1970 (age 55)	31 March 1996		14	5	0	0	20	25 yrs 6 mths 30 days		Search for "Alvis" at rugbyleagueproject.org
15	Mike Jarman	14 September 1971 (age 54)	31 March 1996		1	0	0	0	0	24 yrs 6 mths 17 days		Search for "Jarman" at rugbyleagueproject.org
16	John McAtee	11 November 1975 (age 49)	5 April 1996		3	0	0	0	0	20 yrs 4 mths 25 days		
17	Anthony Hatton	9 October 1975 (age 50)	5 April 1996		21	5	0	4	24	20 yrs 5 mths 27 days		Search for "Hatton" at rugbyleagueproject.org
18	Nick Romanello	22 April 1968 (age 57)	5 April 1996		4	0	0	0	0	27 yrs 11 mths 14 days		Search for "Romanello" at rugbyleagueproject.org
19	Mark Isherwood	9 March 1969 (age 56)	5 April 1996		5	0	0	0	0	27 yrs 0 mths 27 days		Search for "Isherwood" at rugbyleagueproject.org
20	Clint Rylance	1 September 1973 (age 52)	5 April 1996		10	0	0	0	0	22 yrs 7 mths 4 days		Search for "Rylance" at rugbyleagueproject.org
21	Anthony Thomas	19 July 1967 (age 58)	5 April 1996		7	0	0	0	0	28 yrs 8 mths 17 days		Search for "Thomas" at rugbyleagueproject.org
22	Mike Healy	29 August 1965 (age 60)	8 April 1996		8	1	18	0	40	30 yrs 7 mths 10 days		Search for "Healy" at rugbyleagueproject.org
23	Mark Wysocki	16 June 1965 (age 60)	8 April 1996		6	2	0	0	8	30 yrs 9 mths 23 days		Search for "Wysocki" at rugbyleagueproject.org
24	Neil Kelly	20 January 1973 (age 52)	12 April 1996		5	1	0	0	4	23 yrs 2 mths 23 days		Search for "Kelly" at rugbyleagueproject.org
25	Ian Moffatt	30 June 1970 (age 55)	12 April 1996		1	0	0	0	0	25 yrs 9 mths 13 days		Search for "Moffatt" at rugbyleagueproject.org
26	John Fieldhouse	28 June 1962 (age 63)	21 April 1996		14	0	0	0	0	33 yrs 9 mths 24 days		
27	Gerald Williams	4 January 1968 (age 57)	21 April 1996		18	2	0	0	8	28 yrs 3 mths 17 days		
28	Nigel Morris	2 October 1974 (age 51)	5 May 1996		5	2	0	0	8	21 yrs 7 mths 3 days		Search for "Morris" at rugbyleagueproject.org
29	Paul Williamson	27 November 1969 (age 55)	12 May 1996		3	3	0	0	12	26 yrs 5 mths 15 days		
30	Steve Warburton	6 February 1969 (age 56)	12 May 1996		6	1	0	0	4	27 yrs 3 mths 6 days		
31	Paul Moriarty	16 July 1964 (age 61)	17 May 1996		5	1	0	0	4	31 yrs 10 mths 1 days	(Wales) Heritage № 350	
32	Gerald Cordle	29 September 1960 (age 65)	26 May 1996		6	4	0	0	16	35 yrs 7 mths 27 days	(Wales) Heritage № 357	
33	Mark Wallington	12 July 1972 (age 53)	26 May 1996		14	4	0	3	19	23 yrs 10 mths 14 days		
34	Paul Mills	17 April 1974 (age 51)	16 June 1996		11	1	0	0	4	22 yrs 1 mths 30 days		Search for "Mills" at rugbyleagueproject.org
35	Nick Jenkins	24 February 1974 (age 51)	16 June 1996		11	2	0	0	8	22 yrs 3 mths 23 days		
36	Stewart Cash	12 January 1973 (age 52)	16 June 1996		11	0	0	0	0	23 yrs 5 mths 4 days		Search for "Cash" at rugbyleagueproject.org
37	Shane McIntosh	22 December 1968 (age 56)	23 June 1996		2	0	0	0	0	27 yrs 6 mths 1 days		Search for "McIntosh" at rugbyleagueproject.org
38	Neil Mawdsley	28 July 1972 (age 53)	30 June 1996		5	1	0	0	4	23 yrs 11 mths 2 days		
39	Marcus Barnard	7 October 1970 (age 55)	30 June 1996		8	2	0	0	8	25 yrs 8 mths 23 days		Search for "Barnard" at rugbyleagueproject.org
40	Nigel Edmunds	27 June 1969 (age 56)	14 July 1996		7	0	0	0	0	27 yrs 0 mths 17 days		Search for "Edmunds" at rugbyleagueproject.org
41	Paul John	25 January 1970 (age 55)	14 July 1996		3	0	0	0	0	26 yrs 5 mths 19 days		Search for "John" at rugbyleagueproject.org
42	John Doherty	6 January 1977 (age 48)	28 July 1996		5	1	2	2	10	19 yrs 6 mths 22 days		Search for "Doherty" at rugbyleagueproject.org

== Seasons ==
Season	League									Play-offs
Season	Division	P	W	D	L	F	A	Pts	Pos	Play-offs
1996	Division Two	22	12	0	10	528	548	24	6th	Did not qualify

== See also ==
- Sport in Cardiff
- Rugby league in Wales
