= Gerald Cordle =

GB & Wales international rugby league & union footballer

Ged Cordle
Personal information
- Full name: Gerald M. Cordle
- Born: 29 September 1960 (age 65) Cardiff, Wales

Playing information

Rugby union
- Position: Wing
Club
Years	Team	Pld	T	G	FG	P
1982–89	Cardiff RFC	194	166

Rugby league
- Position: Wing
Club
Years	Team	Pld	T	G	FG	P
1989–96	Bradford Northern	122	77	0	0	308
1996	→ South Wales (loan)	6	4	0	0	16
	Total	128	81	0	0	324
Representative
Years	Team	Pld	T	G	FG	P
1991–96	Wales	8	2	0	0	8
1990	Great Britain	1	1	0	0	4

Gerald "Gerry" M. Cordle (born 29 September 1960) is a Welsh former rugby union, and professional rugby league footballer who played in the 1980s and 1990s. He played club level rugby union (RU) for Cardiff RFC, as a Wing, and representative level rugby league (RL) for Great Britain and Wales, and at club level for Bradford Northern and South Wales (loan), as a wing.

== Early life ==
Cordle was born in Cardiff, Wales to a Barbadian father, and was educated at St Mary the Virgin School and Bishop of Llandaff Church in Wales High School.

== Playing career ==
=== Rugby union ===
Having mostly played football in his youth, Cordle was a relative latecomer to rugby, and did not play his first senior game until the age of 19. He started out at local club Butetown after a friend persuaded him to play. After trials with Glamorgan Wanderers and Cardiff RFC, Cordle opted to join the latter.

He made his first team debut for Cardiff in September 1982 against Neath RFC. Between 1982 and 1989, Cordle went on to make almost 200 appearances for the club, and played in four WRU Challenge Cup finals, winning three of them.

He returned to rugby union in 1996, joining West Hartlepool R.F.C.

=== Rugby league ===
Cordle played on the wing and scored two tries in Bradford Northern's 20–14 victory over Featherstone Rovers in the 1989 Yorkshire Cup Final during the 1989–90 season at Headingley, Leeds on Sunday 5 November 1989.

Cordle played on the wing in Bradford Northern's 2–12 defeat by Warrington in the 1990–91 Regal Trophy Final during the 1990–91 season at Headingley, Leeds on Saturday 12 January 1991.

=== International honours ===
Gerald Cordle won caps for Wales (RL) while at Bradford Northern in 1992 against France (interchange/substitute), and England, in 1993 against New Zealand, in 1994 against France, and Australia (interchange/substitute), in 1996 against France, and won a cap for Great Britain (RL) while at Bradford Northern in 1990 against France.

== Personal life ==
Gerald Cordle is the nephew of Tony Cordle, who played cricket for Welsh club Glamorgan.
