= Laurie Osborne =

England international rugby league footballer

- Ogden's Cigarette card featuring Laurie Osborne

Personal information
- Full name: Laurence Osborne
- Born: 1895 Kingston upon Hull, England
- Died: 1953 (aged 57–58) Kingston upon Hull, England

Playing information
- Position: Fullback
Club
Years	Team	Pld	T	G	FG	P
≤1925–≥27	Hull Kingston Rovers	432	22	713	0	1492
Representative
Years	Team	Pld	T	G	FG	P
1925–27	England	2	0	4	0	8

Laurence "Laurie" Osborne (1895 – 1953) was an English professional rugby league footballer who played in the 1920s. He played at representative level for England, and at club level for Hull Kingston Rovers (captain), as a fullback.

== Playing career ==
=== Challenge Cup Final appearances ===
Osborne played fullback, and was captain in Hull Kingston Rovers' 3–16 defeat by Oldham in the 1924–25 Challenge Cup Final during the 1924–25 season at Headingley, Leeds on Saturday 25 April 1925, in front of a crowd of 28,335.

=== County Cup Final appearances ===
Osborne played fullback, and scored two goals in Hull Kingston Rovers' 13–7 victory over Hunslet F.C. in the 1929–30 Yorkshire Cup Final during the 1929–30 season at Headingley, Leeds on Saturday 30 November 1929, in front of a crowd of 11,000.

=== International honours ===
Osborne won caps for England while at Hull Kingston Rovers in 1925 against Wales, and in 1927 against Wales.
