= Jack Hoult =

English rugby league footballer

Personal information
- Full name: J. E. "Jack" Hoult
- Born: c. 1901
- Died: February 1974 (aged 73)

Playing information
- Position: Centre, Stand-off
Club
| Years | Team | Pld | T | G | FG | P |
|---|---|---|---|---|---|---|
| 1922–27 | Hull Kingston Rovers | 174 | 74 | 3 | 0 | 228 |
| 1927–≥27 | York |
| ≤1929–≥31 | Dewsbury |
| 1932–34 | Castleford | 52 | 19 | 0 | 0 | 57 |
| | Total | 226 | 93 | 3 | 0 | 285 |
Representative
| Years | Team | Pld | T | G | FG | P |
| 1924 | Yorkshire | 1 | 1 | 0 | 0 | 3 |

Jack Hoult (c. 1901 – February 1974) was a professional rugby league footballer who played in the 1920s and 1930s, and competitive cyclist of the 1930s. He played at representative level for Yorkshire, and at club level for Hull Kingston Rovers, York, Dewsbury and Castleford, as a centre, or stand-off.

== Background ==
Jack Hoult worked at British Oil and Cake Mills in Kingston upon Hull.

== Playing career ==
=== Challenge Cup Final appearances ===
Jack Hoult played at centre in Hull Kingston Rovers' 3–16 defeat by Oldham in the 1924–25 Challenge Cup Final during the 1924–25 season at Headingley, Leeds on Saturday 25 April 1925, in front of a crowd of 28,335.

=== County League appearances ===
Jack Hoult played in Castleford's victory in the Yorkshire League during the 1932–33 season.
