= Frank Bielby =

English rugby league footballer (1897-1980)

Personal information
- Full name: Francis Bielby
- Born: Oct-Dec 1897; Beverley, England
- Died: 1980 (aged 82–83)

Playing information
- Position: Wing, Centre, Second-row
Club
Years	Team	Pld	T	G	FG	P
1919–28	Hull Kingston Rovers	276	78	0	0	234
1928–30	York
	Total	276	78	0	0	234

Frank Bielby (Oct-Dec 1897 – 1980) was an English professional rugby league footballer who played in the 1910s, 1920s and 1930s. He played at club level for Hull Kingston Rovers and York, as a wing, centre or second-row.

== Playing career ==
=== Challenge Cup Final appearances ===
Frank Bielby played at second-row in Hull Kingston Rovers' 3–16 defeat by Oldham in the 1924–25 Challenge Cup Final during the 1924–25 season at Headingley, Leeds on Saturday 25 April 1925, in front of a crowd of 28,335.

=== Club career ===
Frank Bielby made his début (as did Gilbert Austin) playing second-row for Hull Kingston Rovers, and scored a try in the 22–10 victory over Wakefield Trinity at Craven Street, Kingston upon Hull Saturday 25 January 1919, he played and scored a try in the 7–6 victory over Leeds in the 1924–25 Challenge Cup semi-final during the 1924–25 season at Belle Vue, Wakefield, he played his last match for Hull Kingston Rovers in the 0–19 defeat by Bradford Northern at Odsal Stadium, Bradford on Sunday 19 February 1928, he was transferred from Hull Kingston Rovers to York (as did forward; Frank Boagey), he retired from playing rugby league 2-years later, he then became a gateman at Hull Kingston Rovers.

=== Testimonial match ===
A joint benefit season/testimonial match at Hull Kingston Rovers during the 1927–28 season was shared by; Gilbert Austin and Frank Bielby, during May 1928 each player received £81 9s 7d (based on increases in average earnings, this would be approximately £25,480 in 2017).
