= John Fieldhouse (rugby league) =

English RL coach and former GB international rugby league footballer

Personal information
- Full name: John Fieldhouse
- Born: 28 June 1962 (age 63); Wigan, Lancashire, England

Playing information
- Position: Prop, Hooker, Second-row
Club
Years	Team	Pld	T	G	FG	P
1979–85	Warrington	92+23	16	0	0	56
1985–86	Widnes	47+5	5	0	0	20
1986–89	St. Helens	44+14	7	0	0	28
1989–91	Oldham	59+2	7	0	0	28
1991–96	Halifax	102+9	13	0	0	52
1996	South Wales	13+1	0	0	0	0
1997–98	Whitehaven	0+11	0	0	0	0
1998	Widnes	2+4	0	0	0	0
	Total	428	48	0	0	184
Representative
Years	Team	Pld	T	G	FG	P
1985–86	Great Britain	7	0	0	0	0
1982–86	Lancashire	2+2	0	0	0	0

Coaching information
Club
Years	Team	Gms	W	D	L	W%
1991	Oldham

John Fieldhouse (born 28 June 1962) is an English former professional rugby league footballer who played in the 1970s, 1980s and 1990s, and has coached in the 1990s. He played at representative level for Great Britain, and at club level for Wigan St Patricks ARLFC, Warrington, Widnes (two spells), St. Helens, Oldham and Halifax, as a prop, hooker or second-row, and has coached at club level for Oldham and Leigh East ARLFC.

== Playing career ==
=== Club career ===
Fieldhouse transferred from Warrington to Widnes as part of a deal for Andy Gregory, and then transferred from Widnes to St. Helens in return for Harry Pinner. He went to play for Oldham, Halifax and South Wales.

=== International honours ===
John Fieldhouse won caps for Great Britain while at Widnes in 1985 against New Zealand (3 matches), and in 1986 against France (2 matches), and Australia, and while at St. Helens against Australia.

=== Challenge Cup Final appearances ===
John Fieldhouse played at prop in St. Helens' 18–19 defeat by Halifax in the 1987 Challenge Cup Final during the 1986–87 season at Wembley Stadium, London on Saturday 2 May 1987.

=== County Cup Final appearances ===
John Fieldhouse played at second-row in Warrington's 16–0 victory over St. Helens in the 1982 Lancashire Cup Final during the 1982–83 season at Central Park, Wigan on Saturday 23 October 1982, and played at prop in Oldham's 16–24 defeat by Warrington in the 1989 Lancashire Cup Final during the 1989–90 season at Knowsley Road, St. Helens on Saturday 14 October 1989.

== Genealogical information ==
John Fieldhouse is the father of the rugby league fullback or stand-off for Halifax, Barrow Raiders and Workington Town; Ryan Fieldhouse.
