= Nick Johnson (rugby league) =

English rugby league footballer

Personal information
- Full name: Nicholas Johnson
- Born: 18 December 1990 (age 34) Hull, England
- Height: 175 cm (5 ft 9 in)
- Weight: 85 kg (13 st 5 lb)

Playing information
- Position: Wing, Centre
Club
Years	Team	Pld	T	G	FG	P
2012	Hull Kingston Rovers	1	0	0	0	0
	Newcastle Thunder	0	0	0	0	0
	Redcliffe Dolphins	0	0	0	0	0
	Total	1	0	0	0	0

Nick Johnson (born 18 December 1990) is an English former rugby league footballer who played in the 2010s. He has played at club level for Hull Kingston Rovers, Newcastle Thunder and the Redcliffe Dolphins, as a wing, or centre.

He made his first team début for Hull Kingston Rovers on 8 September 2012 away to London Broncos.
