= Dave Williams (rugby league, born 1967) =

Wales international rugby league footballer

Personal information
- Full name: David Williams
- Born: 20 May 1967 (age 59)

Playing information
Club
Years	Team	Pld	T	G	FG	P
1996	South Wales RLFC	9	4	0	0	16
Representative
Years	Team	Pld	T	G	FG	P
1995–95	Wales	2	1	0	0	4

David Williams (born 20 May 1967) is a former professional rugby league footballer who played in the 1990s. He played at a representative level for Wales.

== International honours ==
Williams won caps for Wales while a Welsh student in 1995 against the United States (2 matches).
