= Peter Murphy (rugby league) =

Scottish rugby league player

Personal information
- Full name: Peter Murphy
- Born: 27 July 1941 (age 83); Oban, Scotland

Playing information
- Position: Left wing, Prop, Second-row
Club
Years	Team	Pld	T	G	FG	P
≥1959–66	Hull Kingston Rovers	34+2	2	0	0	6
1964–64/65	→ Wakefield Trinity (Trial)	2	0	0	0	0
	Total	38	2	0	0	6

Peter Murphy (born 27 July 1941) is a Scottish-born former professional rugby league footballer who played in the 1950s and 1960s. He played at club level for South Newington ARLFC (in Kingston upon Hull), Hull Kingston Rovers, Wakefield Trinity (Trial), Dee Street Recreation ARLFC (in Kingston upon Hull) and Castleford (A-Team Trial), as a wing (4-matches for Hull Kingston Rovers), or more usually as a prop or second-row.

== Background ==
Peter Murphy was born in Oban, Scotland, where his grandfather was the captain of a minesweeper in the Royal Navy, he is avid supporter of Hull Kingston Rovers, as of 2020 he is a member of Hull Kingston Rovers Heritage Committee, and as of 2020 he lives in Kingston upon Hull.

== Playing career ==
=== Eastern Division Championship Final appearances ===
Peter Murphy played at second-row in Hull Kingston Rovers' 13–10 victory over Huddersfield in the Eastern Division Championship Final during the 1962–63 season at Headingley, Leeds on Saturday 10 November 1962.

=== Club career ===
Peter Murphy changed from amateur to professional rugby league when he transferred from South Newington ARLFC to Hull Kingston Rovers during August 1959, he played approximately 240-matches for Hull Kingston Rovers' A-Team, with whom he won a Yorkshire Senior Cup final, he played for Hull Kingston Rovers' against Hull F.C. in 3 exhibition games on three consecutive evenings that aimed to introduce rugby league in Cornwall; the 26–57 defeat at Mennaye Field (the home of Penzance and Newlyn RFC now the Cornish Pirates), Penzance on Monday 4 June 1962, the 26–38 defeat at the Recreation Ground (the home of Camborne RFC), Camborne on Tuesday 5 June 1962 and the defeat at the Recreation Ground (the home of Falmouth RFC), Falmouth on Wednesday 6 June 1962, he played nearly all of Hull Kingston Rovers' first team matches during the 1962–63 season, the first fourteen of which were won, he did not play in the 2–12 defeat by Hunslet F.C. in the 1962–63 Yorkshire Cup Final during the 1962–63 season at Headingley, Leeds on Saturday 27 October 1962, in front of a crowd of 22,742, he played in the 10–7 victory over Widnes in the 1962–63 Challenge Cup quarter-final match at Naughton Park, Widnes on Saturday 6 April 1963, he played in the 4–18 defeat Wigan in the 1962–63 Challenge Cup semi-final match on Saturday 20 April 1963, he sustained a broken leg on four occasions while at Hull Kingston Rovers, he played on trial from Hull Kingston Rovers at Wakefield Trinity, he made his début for Wakefield Trinity during September 1964, he sustained broken ribs against Featherstone Rovers at Belle Vue, Wakefield, he played his last match for Wakefield Trinity during the 1964–65 season, he returned from trial at Wakefield Trinity to Hull Kingston Rovers, he regained his first team place at Hull Kingston Rovers, he changed from professional to amateur rugby league when he transferred from Hull Kingston Rovers to Dee Street Recreation ARLFC, he was offered a trial at Castleford, he sustained a broken hand in an A-Team trial match, and he returned from trial at Castleford to Dee Street Recreation ARLFC.
