= Bishop of Llandaff Church in Wales High School =

The Bishop of Llandaff Church in Wales High School

Location
- Rookwood Close; Llandaff, Cardiff, CF5 2NR; Wales

Information
- Type: Voluntary aided comprehensive
- Motto: "Faith in Education"
- Religious affiliation: Church in Wales
- Established: 1961
- Department for Education URN: 401889 Tables
- Chair: Susan Jones
- Headteacher: Marc Belli
- Staff: 190 (75 teachers; 115 support staff)
- Gender: Coeducational
- Age: 11 to 19
- Enrolment: 1,300 (approx.)
- Houses: St John (Red); St Paul (Yellow); St Teilo (Green); St David (Blue)
- Website: www.bishopofllandaff.org

The Bishop of Llandaff High School (Welsh: Ysgol Uwchradd yr Eglwys yng Nghymru Esgob Llandaf) is a Church in Wales, Christian faith comprehensive school in the Llandaff area of Cardiff, Wales. The school admits students aged 11 to 18, from Cardiff and surrounding areas such as Vale of Glamorgan, Pontypridd and Bridgend. While the school is supported and partially controlled by the Church in Wales, it includes students from other Christian denominations, as well as students from different faith backgrounds and, indeed, those with no faith background.

The school is one of the highest achieving in the country with examination performance at all levels consistently well above expectations. In recent years, The Bishop of Llandaff has been active in supporting other schools. This has included a local secondary school following a challenging inspection and, more recently, through its work as a regional consortia hub school. In this area the school provides support to both primary and secondary schools around the areas of leadership development, improving teaching and, specifically, thorough support in English. In 2018, the school was inspected by Estyn and awarded ‘Excellent’ in every category and asked by inspectors to produce case studies to support other schools.

== House System ==
There are four school houses used within the school. These are: St David, St John, St Teilo and St Paul. The houses are colour-coded as well. St David is blue, St John is red, St Teilo is green and St Paul is yellow. Every student and teacher is placed into one of the houses and compete in a range of events/activities to help win the annual Eisteddfod competition. In October 2016, the school commissioned a company to design shield badges for each of the houses, which students and staff can wear as part of their uniform.

== The Marion Centre ==
The Marion Centre is a specialist resource base at The Bishop of Llandaff for students with Autistic Spectrum Disorder (ASD). The Centre officially opened in September 2009 and currently supports up to 48 students with ASD from the Cardiff area. The school, with funding from Cardiff Local Authority and Welsh Government built a more permanent building at the cost of £4.8 million in 2012. In addition, to increase opportunities for sport, £1.5million has been spent building a new 3G Astroturf, a new rugby pitch and fitness suite.

== Notable alumni ==
- Gerald Cordle, Welsh former rugby union, and professional rugby league footballer
- Jonathan Morgan Welsh Conservative AM for Cardiff North
- Sarah Loosemore Tennis player
- Ann Main, Conservative Member of Parliament for St Albans
- Rebecca Evans (politician), Welsh Labour Member of the Senedd, and Welsh Government Minister
