= Louis Harris (rugby league) =

English rugby league footballer

Personal information
- Born: April 1896 Hull, England
- Died: March 1975 (aged 78)

Playing information
- Position: Wing
Club
Years	Team	Pld	T	G	FG	P
1920–28	Hull Kingston Rovers	254	77	1	0	233

Coaching information
Club
Years	Team	Gms	W	D	L	W%
	Hull Kingston Rovers	0	0	0	0
- As of 11 May 2021

Louis Harris MBE (1896–1975) was an English rugby league footballer.

Harris played 255-matches and scored 76-tries, and 1-conversion for 230-points for Hull Kingston Rovers, including in the Challenge Cup in 1925, and were Northern Rugby Football Union champions in 1921 and 1923. He played 1919-1929 for Rovers, and was later a club coach and advisor, and a boardroom Director.

Harris was awarded MBE in 1969 for work with the Great War Trust. He was Jewish. The Jews were the first significant minority group to play rugby in Britain.

== Challenge Cup Final appearances ==
Lewis Harris played on the wing in Hull Kingston Rovers' 3–16 defeat by Oldham in the 1924–25 Challenge Cup Final during the 1924–25 season at Headingley, Leeds on Saturday 25 April 1925, in front of a crowd of 28,335.

== See also ==
- List of select Jewish rugby league players
