= Thomas Milner (physician) =

English physician

- Born: 1719; Peckham
- Died: 13 September 1797 (aged 77–78); Maidstone
- Occupation: Physician

Thomas Milner (1719 – 13 September 1797) was an English physician.

== Biography ==
Milner was the son of John Milner, a presbyterian minister, was born at Peckham, near London, where his father preached and kept a school famous in literature from the fact that Goldsmith was in 1757 one of its ushers (Forster, Life of Goldsmith). He graduated M.D. at St. Andrews 20 June 1740, and in 1759 was elected physician to St. Thomas's Hospital. He became a licentiate of the Royal College of Physicians 30 September 1760, but in 1762 resigned his physiciancy at St. Thomas's, and settled in Maidstone, where he attained to large practice and used to walk to the parish church every Sunday bearing a gold-headed cane, and followed in linear succession by the three unmarried sisters who lived with him. In 1783 he published in London ‘Experiments and Observations on Electricity,’ a work in which he described some of the effects which an electrical power is capable of producing on conducting substances, similar effects of the same power on electric bodies themselves, and observations on the air, electric repulsion, the electrified cup, and the analogy between electricity and magnetism. He died at Maidstone 13 September 1797, and is buried in All Saints' Church there.
