= Gilbert Austin (rugby league) =

English rugby league footballer

Personal information
- Full name: Gilbert Austin
- Born: first ¼ 1895; Sculcoates district, Hull, England
- Died: 1 February 1948 (aged 53); Hull, England

Playing information
- Position: Fullback, Wing, Centre
Club
| Years | Team | Pld | T | G | FG | P |
|---|---|---|---|---|---|---|
| 1919–28 | Hull Kingston Rovers | 347 | 163 | 28 | 0 | 536 |
| 1928–≥29 | York |
| | Total | 347 | 163 | 28 | 0 | 536 |
Representative
| Years | Team | Pld | T | G | FG | P |
| 1923–25 | Yorkshire | 4 | 0 | 0 | 0 | 0 |

Gilbert Austin (first ¼ 1895 – 1 February 1948) was an English professional rugby league footballer who played in the 1910s and 1920s. He played at representative level for Yorkshire, and at club level fo Hull Kingston Rovers and York, as a (occasional) goal-kicking fullback, wing, or centre.

== Background ==
Austin's birth was registered in Sculcoates district, Hull, East Riding of Yorkshire, England, he lived in First Lane, Northfield, Hessle c. 1948. He died from injuries sustained in a traffic collision, when a taxi that he, his wife (also seriously injured) and another four people (of which one woman was also seriously injured) were travelling in, was in collision with a truck near Ferriby, East Riding of Yorkshire, England.

== Playing career ==
=== Club career ===
Austin made his début (as did Frank Bielby) for Hull Kingston Rovers, and scored a try in the 22–10 victory over Wakefield Trinity at Craven Street, Kingston upon Hull Saturday 25 January 1919. He mainly played fullback in his first two seasons of 1918–19 season and 1919–20 season, mainly played centre in the 1920–21 season and 1921–22 season, and mainly played wing from the 1922–23 season onwards. He scored 37 tries in the 1924–25 season, including six tries against Halifax in the RFL Yorkshire Cup. He was described as being ‘not blessed with either pace or tremendous strength, he was an extremely dedicated and reliable all-rounder who knew his way to the try-line and who never gave less than his best’. He scored his last try for Hull Kingston Rovers against St. Helens Recs on Sunday 1 January 1928, and played his last match for Hull Kingston Rovers in the 0–0 draw with Dewsbury at Craven Street, Kingston upon Hull on Saturday 7 January 1928. He was transferred from Hull Kingston Rovers to York during early October 1928.

Austin played on the wing in Hull Kingston Rovers' 3–16 defeat by Oldham in the 1924–25 Challenge Cup Final during the 1924–25 season at Headingley, Leeds on Saturday 25 April 1925, in front of a crowd of 28,335.

A joint benefit season/testimonial match at Hull Kingston Rovers during the 1927–28 season was shared by; Gilbert Austin and Frank Bielby, during May 1928 each player received £81 9s 7d (based on increases in average earnings, this would be approximately £25,480 in 2017).

=== Representative honours ===
Austin played on the wing for "The Reds" in the 15–38 defeat by "The Whites" in a trial match for the 1924 Great Britain Lions tour of Australia and New Zealand trial match at Central Park, Wigan on Wednesday 20 February 1924, in front of a crowd of 15,000, but ultimately he was not selected for Great Britain.

Austin played for Yorkshire while at Hull Kingston Rovers; he played on the wing in the 5–6 defeat by Lancashire in the 1923–24 County Championship match during the 1923–24 season at Watersheddings, Oldham on Saturday 8 December 1923, he played on the wing in the 0–20 defeat by Cumberland in the 1924–25 County Championship match during the 1924–25 season at the Recreation Ground, Whitehaven on Saturday 18 October 1924. he played on the wing in the 9–28 defeat by Lancashire in the 1924–25 County Championship match during the 1924–25 season at Thrum Hall, Halifax on Saturday 29 November 1924. and he played on the wing in the 10–26 defeat by Lancashire in the 1925–26 County Championship match during the 1925–26 season at City Road (the then home ground of St. Helens Recs), St. Helens on Saturday 12 December 1925.

=== Career records ===
Austin previously held rugby league's "most consecutive matches played" record with 190 matches, from his début on Saturday 25 January 1919 to nearly 5-years later on Saturday 8 December 1923, when he played for Yorkshire against Lancashire. This record was subsequently surpassed by Keith Elwell.
