= Andy Currier =

GB international rugby league & union footballer

Personal information
- Full name: Andrew S. Currier
- Born: 8 April 1966 (age 58); Widnes, Cheshire, England

Playing information
- Height: 6 ft 4 in (193 cm)
- Weight: 15 st 4 lb (97 kg)

Rugby league
- Position: Centre
Club
Years	Team	Pld	T	G	FG	P
1983–93	Widnes	238	112	201	1	851
1989–90	Balmain Tigers	23	10	68	0	176
1994–95	Featherstone Rovers	11	3	1	0	14
1995–97	Warrington	19	7	0	0	28
1996	South Wales	22	14	0	0	56
1997	Workington Town	5	4	0	0	16
1997	Widnes Vikings	9	6	0	0	24
	Total	327	156	270	1	1165
Representative
Years	Team	Pld	T	G	FG	P
1989–93	Great Britain	2	0	6	0	12
1988–91	Lancashire	2	2	0	0	8
1988	GB tour games	5	3	5	0	22

Rugby union
Club
Years	Team	Pld	T	G	FG	P
1997–00	London Welsh
2000–??	Worcester
	Total	0	0	0	0	0

Andrew S. Currier is an English former professional rugby league and rugby union footballer who played in the 1980s, 1990s and 2000s. A Great Britain national representative goal-kicking centre, he played most of his club rugby with English club Widnes as well as stints with Featherstone Rovers and the Australian team Balmain Tigers. At the time of his retirement, he was co-holder of the Widnes club record for most points in a match, with 34. He played out the last years of his career with English rugby union teams.

== Playing career ==
=== Club career ===
Currier began his professional career with Widnes, signing from Halton Hornets in July 1983. He later helped them to consecutive championships in 1988 and 1989, and then to victory in the 1989 World Club Challenge.

Currier moved to Australia to play with Sydney club, the Balmain Tigers, and became the NSWRL's top point scorer for the 1989 season. Currier also played in the memorable 1989 Winfield Cup Grand Final loss against Canberra at the end of that season. At the end of the NSWRL 1990 season, Currier returned to England to continue playing for Widnes

Currier played right-centre and scored a try in Widnes' 24-18 victory over Salford in the 1990 Lancashire Cup Final during the 1990–91 season at Central Park, Wigan on Saturday 29 September 1990.

Currier played right-centre and scored a conversion in Widnes' 6-12 defeat by Wigan in the 1988–89 John Player Special Trophy Final during the 1988–89 season at Burnden Park, Bolton on Saturday 7 January 1989, and played right-centre and scored a conversion in the 24-0 victory over Leeds in the 1991–92 Regal Trophy Final during the 1991–92 season at Central Park, Wigan on Saturday 11 January 1992, and helped the team reach the 1993 Challenge Cup Final.

At the end of that season he was purchased by Featherstone Rovers for a club record fee of £150,000, but missed the entire 1993–94 season after suffering a knee injury during a pre-season friendly. He later played for Warrington and South Wales before ending his rugby league career with his original club, Widnes.

Currier also played rugby union for London Welsh and Worcester following his retirement from rugby league.

=== Representative career ===
During the 1988 Great Britain Lions tour, Currier was flown to Australia as a replacement for the injured Garry Schofield. He made his Test debut in 1989 against New Zealand, and received one further cap in 1993 against France.

== Personal life ==
Currier's father, Harry Currier, founded the Widnes-based amateur rugby league club, Halton Simms Cross.
