= David Perkins Page =

American educator (1810–1848)

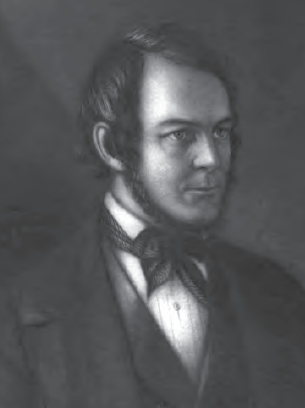

David Perkins Page (1810–1848) was an American educator and author of the most popular 19th-century American education textbook. From 1844 to 1847, he served as the first principal of the New York State Normal School, which later became University at Albany, SUNY.

Page was born to a farm family in Epping, New Hampshire, on July 4, 1810. As a child, he begged his father to let him attend the nearby Hampton Academy, but his father refused, because he did not consider a school education necessary for a farmer. However, after Page contracted a nearly fatal illness in 1826 at the age of 16, his father relented. Page then attended the academy for a few months at age 17, advanced sufficiently to obtain a teacher's license, and taught for a term in local schools in order to fund his further studies. He then returned to the Hampton Academy and studied for an additional year.

In the winter of 1829, at the age of 19, Page began teaching in a country school in Newbury, Massachusetts. After the winter term, he founded his own private school, beginning with five pupils. In March 1832, he was chosen to become Associate Principal of the new Newburyport high school, where he headed the English Department. In Massachusetts high schools in the early 19th century, the English Department was the half of the high school with a practical focus, and was distinct from the Classical Department which focused on preparing students for college by focusing on Latin and Greek.

In August 1838, Page delivered an address before the American Institute of Instruction on the topic of "Duties of Parents and Teachers". Horace Mann, who was in the audience, stated that this was the finest speech delivered before the Institute in its history, and arranged to have 6,000 copies printed and circulated to Massachusetts teachers. Page became a frequent contributor to Mann's Common School Journal.

In December 1844, Page was selected to be the first principal of the new New York State Normal School in Albany, New York. The state legislature had appropriated funds for the school in the previous year, based on the example of Mann's school in Massachusetts, and sought out Page on Mann's recommendation. The project faced stiff political opposition, and throughout the following years, Page spent much of his time traveling around New York shoring up support for the Normal School.

In 1847, Page published his only book, Theory and Practice of Teaching. It became extremely popular in the growing normal school movement, and had been printed in 25 editions by 1864. By the time the copyright had expired in 1889, more than 100,000 copies had been sold and it was the most widely used textbook in American teacher education.

Page fell ill near the end of the autumn 1847 term. His illness was widely attributed to exhaustion from the effort expended in defending the Normal School. He died of pneumonia on January 1, 1848, and was buried according to his wishes in Newburyport.
