= Louis Sheriff =

English rugby league footballer

Personal information
- Full name: Louis Sheriff
- Born: 6 September 1992 (age 33) Kingston upon Hull, Humberside, England
- Height: 5 ft 9 in (175 cm)
- Weight: 12 st 13 lb (82 kg)

Playing information
- Position: Fullback, Wing
Club
Years	Team	Pld	T	G	FG	P
2011–12	Hull Kingston Rovers	9	4	0	0	16
2013	Redcliffe Dolphins
2014	Dewsbury Rams	9	3	0	0	12
2014(loan)	→ Gateshead Thunder	10	5	0	0	20
2015	Gateshead Thunder	15	7	0	0	28
2016–17	Doncaster	42	21	0	0	84
2018	Hemel Stags	21	3	1	1	15
2019	Sheffield Eagles	0	0	0	0	0
2019–20	Keighley Cougars	7	2	0	0	8
2021–	Featherstone Rovers	0	0	0	0	0
	Total	113	45	1	1	183
- Source: As of 6 January 2021

Louis Sheriff (born 6 September 1992) is an English rugby league footballer who plays as a fullback, wing for Featherstone Rovers in the Betfred League 1.

He has played for Hull Kingston Rovers, the Redcliffe Dolphins in Australia, Dewsbury Rams, Gateshead Thunder (two spells, one as a loan) and Doncaster.

== Early career ==
Sheriff came through the youth setup at Hull Kingston Rovers.

== Club career ==
=== Hull KR ===
Sheriff made his first team début for Hull Kingston Rovers on 25 April 2011 at home to Harlequins RL, deputising for the injured Shaun Briscoe. On his début he looked confident and managed to get himself onto the scoresheet, earning him the club Man of the Match award.

=== Hemel Stags ===
In November 2017 he signed to play for Hemel in the 2018 season.

=== Sheffield Eagles ===
In October 2018 Sheriff joined the Sheffield Eagles on a one-year deal but was released in May 2019 and joined Keighley Cougars for the rest of the 2019 season.

=== Featherstone Rovers ===
On 4 Jan 2021 it was announced that Sheriff would join Featherstone Rovers
