= Mike Fletcher (rugby league) =

English rugby league footballer

Personal information
- Full name: Michael Fletcher
- Born: 14 April 1967 (age 58); England

Playing information
- Position: Fullback, Centre
Club
Years	Team	Pld	T	G	FG	P
1985–98	Hull Kingston Rovers	360	56	1267	1	2759
1999	Hunslet Hawks	27	3	128	5	273
	Total	387	59	1395	6	3032
Representative
Years	Team	Pld	T	G	FG	P
1988	Great Britain U21	2	0	4	0	8
1991	Humberside XIII	1	0	1	0	2

Mike Fletcher (born 14 April 1967) is an English former professional rugby league footballer who played as a fullback, or centre. He spent almost his entire club career at Hull Kingston Rovers, and is the club's record point scorer. He also played for Hunslet Hawks. At representative level, Fletcher appeared for Great Britain under-21s, and in a Humberside XIII.

== Career ==
Fletcher made his début for Hull Kingston Rovers in April 1985 against Widnes. He went on set a number of club records, including the most career goals (1,268) and most career points (2,760). He also holds the club record for most goals and points in a single season, scoring 450 points (including 199 goals) in 1989–90. He left the club in 1998 and joined Hunslet Hawks.

At representative level, Fletcher played twice for Great Britain under-21s in 1988, and played in a Humberside XIII against Papua New Guinea in 1991.
