= Tommy Milner (rugby league) =

England international rugby league footballer (??–??)

Personal information
- Full name: Thomas Milner

Playing information
- Position: Stand-off
Club
| Years | Team | Pld | T | G | FG | P |
|---|---|---|---|---|---|---|
| ≤1912–≥14 | Dewsbury |
| 1914–20 | Hull FC |
| | Total | 0 | 0 | 0 | 0 | 0 |
Representative
| Years | Team | Pld | T | G | FG | P |
| 1914 | England | 1 | 1 | 0 | 0 | 3 |

Thomas Milner (birth unknown – death unknown) was an English professional rugby league footballer who played in the 1910s. He played at representative level for England, and at club level for Dewsbury and Hull FC, as a stand-off.

== Playing career ==
=== Challenge Cup Final appearances ===
Milner played stand-off in Dewsbury's 8-5 victory over Oldham in the 1911–12 Challenge Cup Final during the 1911-12 season at Headingley, Leeds on Saturday 27 April 1912 in front of a crowd of 16,000.

=== International honours ===
Milner won a cap for England while at Dewsbury in 1914 against Wales.
