= Dave Page =

American shoemaker

Dave Page (born 1939) is considered the world's leading expert on mountaineering footwear history, as well as an expert cobbler (a hiking boot repairman). He is a former history professor at the University of Washington and is a cobbler based in Seattle, Washington, United States. He has been resoling mountain boots since 1968. He works closely with boot manufacturers worldwide doing a wide range of innovative resoling and repair work. Forensic anthropologists called on Dave Page to help identify the manufacturer of the boots found on the body of George Mallory. Page has made many historic mountain climbing ascents among contemporaries Fred Beckey and other notable cascade climbers of the 20th century; these included ascents in the Himalayas.
