= Sam Latus =

English rugby league footballer

Personal information
- Full name: Sam Latus
- Born: 21 October 1989 (age 35); Hull, England
- Height: 178 cm (5 ft 10 in)
- Weight: 83 kg (13 st 1 lb)

Playing information
- Position: Wing
Club
Years	Team	Pld	T	G	FG	P
2010–13	Hull Kingston Rovers	38	14	0	0	46
2013	Newcastle Thunder	0	0	0	0	0
2013	York City Knights
	Total	38	14	0	0	46

Sam Latus (born 21 October 1989) is a former English rugby league footballer who played for Hull Kingston Rovers in the Super League competition. His position was centre.

Latus was assigned the club man of the match award during his début against the Huddersfield Giants in the 2010 for the Hull Kingston Rovers.
