= Hull Kingston Rovers =

English professional rugby league club

Club information
- Full name: Hull Kingston Rovers Rugby Football Club
- Nickname(s): The Robins; Rovers; KR
- Short name: Hull KR
- Colours: Red and white
- Founded: 1882; 144 years ago (as Kingston Amateurs)
- Website: hullkr.co.uk

Current details
- Ground: Craven Park (11,000)
- Chairman: Paul Sewell
- Coach: (Australia) Willie Peters
- Captain: (England) Elliot Minchella
- Competition: Super League
- 2026 season: 6th (Eliminated in playoffs)
- Current season

Uniforms
Home colours	Away colours	Third colours

Records
- Championships: 6 (1923, 1925, 1979, 1984, 1985, 2025)
- Challenge Cups: 2 (1980, 2025)
- League Leaders Shield: 1 (2025)
- World Club Challenge: 1 (2026)
- Other top-tier honours: 15

Hull Kingston Rovers (often abbreviated to Hull KR) are a professional rugby league club based in Kingston upon Hull, Yorkshire, England. The club play home games at Craven Park and compete in Super League, the top tier of British rugby league.

Hull KR have won the League Championship six times and Challenge Cup twice. In 2025, the club won its first League Leaders' Shield, and the 2025 Super League Grand Final for the first time, and in 2026 they won their first ever World Club Challenge, to win all 4 trophies.

Hull Kingston Rovers are one of two professional rugby league teams in Hull. Hull F.C. play on the west side of the city, and Hull KR on the east side, at Sewell Group Craven Park. The River Hull is the divide between the two. Hull KR's nickname, "The Robins", originates from their traditional playing colours of red and white.

After a ten-year stay in the Super League (2007–2016), they were relegated to the Championship in the 2016 season, due to the Million Pound Game. In the 2017 Championship season, Hull KR successfully gained automatic promotion back to the Super League, at the first time of asking.

== History ==
=== 19th century ===
Hull Kingston Rovers began in 1882 when a group of apprentice boilermakers in the Hessle Road area of Hull came together to start a team, Kingston Amateurs. Their first ground was a piece of wasteland in Albert Street, the club started playing in the Hull and District League in the autumn of 1883. By 1885 Kingston Amateurs had played at three grounds, Albert Street, Anlaby Road and finally Chalk Lane. The club name was also changed to Kingston Rovers as they entered the Times Cup in the 1885–86 season. A number of clubs joined the league and the club entered the new Hull and District Rugby Union Cup, losing to Hull A in the final. The club won its first trophy in the 1887–88 season by winning the Times Cup, beating Selby A in the final. The Hull Kingston Rovers moved to their fourth ground, down Hessle Road.

In 1888–89, 6,000 fans turned up to the cup game against Hull A at the Holderness Road ground, which ended as a draw. Rovers went through the next season losing just two games, defeating Britannia in the Times Cup final.

Rovers beat Hull A for the first time in 1889–90, and moved to their fifth ground, again down Hessle Road. The Red and Whites won the Times Cup for the third year running in 1891–92 beating York A in the final. 1892 saw Rovers play at the Boulevard for the first time and they leased the ground for three years from the following season. Only one away win was recorded this season and six home wins, but Rovers entered the Yorkshire Cup for the first time although they were knocked out by Dewsbury in the second round. In 1893 Rovers played out of the Boulevard, and they lost to Bradford Northern that season in the first round of the Yorkshire Cup. Amos Law, a drop kicker joined the club from Cleckheaton and Huddersfield, while George William Lofthouse played at the age of 14; the youngest ever player to turn out for the senior side.

In 1895 the Northern Football Union was founded, when the leading rugby union sides in the North of England broke away to form a league of their own, comprising 22 clubs. Rovers, then nicknamed "the redbreasts" did not join the new organisation and were instead promoted to the second division of the RFU finishing joint second. They moved to their first ground in East Hull in Craven Street off Holderness Road. In 1896–97, they were denied a place in the first division when several sides resigned but when the West Riding club dropped out, Rovers moved up.

Hull KR amalgamated with Albany Soccer Club. After a successful amalgamation the clubs resources they then went onto win the Yorkshire Cup for the first time beating Shipley 11–5 in the final. The club also won the league competition and beat the rest of the league 26–8 in a challenge match. Rovers applied to join the Northern Union and played their first match under the new code in 1897–98.

Rovers were elected into the inaugural Yorkshire Second competition in 1898–99 winning all 17 matches. A club record of 19 consecutive league play-off and cup wins was set in that season with the club subsequently defeating Heckmondwike in a promotion/relegation match to qualify for the Yorkshire Senior Competition. Hull Kingston Rovers were thus admitted into full membership of the Yorkshire Northern Union and finished 6th out of 16 beating Hull 8–2 in the first local derby on 16 September 1899, in front of a 14,000 crowd.

=== Early 20th century ===
In 1901–02, the top Yorkshire clubs formed their own 'super league' and Rovers played in the Lancashire League finishing 5th out of 13. Hull Kingston Rovers were one of the new teams to join the second division and finished joint second.

In 1904–05, Rovers reached the Challenge Cup Final losing 0–6 to Warrington in front of a crowd of 19,638. In the first round on 4 March 1905, Rovers beat Brookland Rovers 73–5 with G.H. 'Tich' West scoring 53 of the points with 11 tries and 10 goals, still a club and world rugby league record. In 1906/07 they reached the final of the Yorkshire Cup only to lose to Bradford F.C. 5–8.

In 1908, Rovers gained a memorable 21–16 win over the first touring Australian side. In 1911/12 they finished 3rd out of 27 but lost 10–22 to Huddersfield in the final of the Yorkshire Cup. In 1912/13 Rovers finished 3rd again out of 26 clubs and lost to Wigan in the Championship semi final play-off and finished runners-up in the Yorkshire League Championship.

Leagues were suspended in 1915 due to the First World War. When an official regional league resumed on 18 January 1919, Rovers finished 19th out of 25. In 1920/21, Rovers finished top of the Rugby League but lost 14–16 to Hull F.C. in the play-off final at Headingley. They had their revenge in the Yorkshire Cup final beating Hull 2–0 to win their first cup as a professional side.

Rovers then moved to their second ground in East Hull, Old Craven Park, behind the tram and bus depot on the eastern end of Holderness Road in 1922. The land cost £18,281 and included 14 tennis courts. They lost their first match at the new ground 0-0-0 to 0–1–3 Wakefield Trinity on 2 September 1922, Albert Rosenfeld scoring Trinity's try. The club finished 4th out of 27 in the league and they won the League Championship Cup beating Huddersfield 15–5. In season 1923/4 Gilbert Austin voluntarily ended a run of 190 consecutive appearances when he was selected to play for Yorkshire, which he considered a great honour.

1924–25 saw Rovers finish 2nd in the league, win the League Championship Cup, the Yorkshire League Cup, were semi-finalists in the Yorkshire Cup and runners-up in the Challenge Cup final. In 1925/26 Rovers finished 6th and won the Yorkshire League Championship. In 1926/27 the club finished 6th out of 29 but managed to beat a touring New Zealand side 20–15.

In 1929–30 Rovers won the Yorkshire Cup beating Hunslet 13–7 in the final, and finished 6th in the league. In 1933/34 the club lost 4–10 to York F.C. in the Yorkshire Cup Final.

Hull Kingston Rovers sold Craven Park for £10,750 to the Greyhound Racing Company in 1938 due to financial difficulties, securing a 21-year lease to continue playing there.

=== Post-Second World War ===
Leagues were again suspended during the Second World War. When the league resumed in 1945 Rovers finished 18th out of 27. Between 1947 and 1957, Rovers finished between 17th and 29th in the league. Colin Hutton was Hull KR coach from 1957 to 1970. In 1958 the club's fortunes started improving, finishing 18th out of 30. In 1959–60 the club finished 13th out of 30, the first time the club had finished in the top half of the table since 1930–31 – the players shared a bonus of £500 to share.

In 1961–62, the club won 17 successive matches and finished 8th out of 30. In 1962, the league was split into East and West of the Pennines; Huddersfield and Hull Kingston Rovers met at Headingley, Leeds in the first final of the Eastern Division Championship on Saturday 10 November 1962. Reigning champions, Huddersfield were favourites to lift the Eastern Division title, especially as Rovers were missing five first choice players with injuries. The Robins, however, set the early pace and were 10–0 up after 30 minutes. Despite a rally by Huddersfield, Rovers hung on to win 13–10. Rovers win was their first trophy for more than 30 years. In 1962–63 as two division rugby returned, they finished the season tenth out of sixteen in Division 1.

In 1963–64, Rovers reached the Challenge Cup Final at Wembley for the first time, losing 5–13 to Widnes in front of 84,488 fans. A return to Division One rugby was made in 1964–65 when Rovers finished 8th out of 30. In 1965/66 Rovers finished 12th out of 30. Rovers finished second in 1966–67, their highest place for over 40 years and the Yorkshire Cup was won with a 25–12 victory over Featherstone Rovers.

The club bought Roger Millward from Castleford on 8 August 1966 for the sum of £6,000. Rovers won the Mackeson Trophy for being the top points scorers in the Rugby League. Rovers won the Yorkshire Cup for the second year running in 1967–68, beating Hull 8–7 in the final; the first all-Hull final in 47 years. The club finished third in the league and lost 10–17 to Wakefield Trinity in the play-off final; Rovers were runners-up in the Yorkshire League and beat the Australians 27–15 with Millward scoring a hat-trick.

=== 1970s ===
Johnny Whiteley joined Hull Kingston Rovers as coach in 1970 and stayed until 1972.

In the early 1970s Hull KR purchased a site at Winchester Avenue with the aim of building a new stadium. The plans never came to fruition and the site was later sold to a private developer. The profit made from this land was used to buy back Craven Park with greyhound racing continuing as a subsidiary concern.

New Zealand visited Craven Park on 8 September 1971. The Kiwis, playing their third game in five days, were unable to match the Robins, who beat the Kiwis 12–10.

Rovers won a further two Yorkshire Cup winners medals in 1971/72 and 1974/75. In 1973/74 the club was relegated to Division 2 when they finished 14 out of 16 in Division 1. Rovers gained promotion back to Division 1 the next year and won the Yorkshire Cup for the sixth time beating Wakefield Trinity 16–13 in the final. They also reached the semi-finals of the BBC2 Floodlit Trophy, the John Player Trophy and the Premiership Trophy. In 1975/76 the club were runners-up in the Yorkshire Cup losing 11–15 to Leeds.

Coach Harry Poole died in 1976/77, and Millward took over as temporary player-coach and in his first season guided the club to their first ever BBC2 Floodlit Trophy victory as the Robins beat St. Helens 26–11. The club finished 4th out of 16 in the league.

Phil Hogan was transferred to Hull KR in 1978 for a then world record fee of £35,000. Rovers topped the league for the first time since 1925. In 1979/80, under coach Roger Millward, Hull KR achieved a famous defeat of neighbours Hull, by a margin of 10–5 in the final of the Challenge Cup, at Wembley in front of 95,000 fans. A makeshift sign was left on the A63 (the major westerly road out of Hull) that read "last one out turn the lights off!" due to most of the city travelling to Wembley for the final. Also, a '10–5' bar is now situated inside Craven Park.

Steve Hubbard scored nine out of the ten points for Rovers. Millward played the full game, despite having his jaw broken early in the game. Earlier in the same season, Rovers had lost in the final of the BBC2 Floodlit Trophy against Hull.

=== 1980s and early 1990s ===
In 1980/81, Millward retired as a player after having his jaw broken for the third time, the club finished 3rd in the league but lost 18–9 to Widnes in the final of the Challenge Cup in front of 94,496. Rovers lost in the final of the Yorkshire Cup 7–8 to Leeds but won the Premiership Trophy beating Hull 11–7. International full back George Fairbairn was signed from Wigan suring the summer of 1981 for a then world record fee of £72.500. In 1981/82 Rovers finished 4th in the league and lost in the final of the John Player Trophy 4–12 against Hull.

In 1982/83 Rovers finished as runners-up in the league. In 1983/84 Rovers were crowned champions of the 1st Division and went on to win the Divisional Premiership beating Castleford 18–10 in the final at Headingley; becoming the first team to win the Championship / Premiership double. In 1984–85 they nearly repeated the feat winning the Division 1 Championship but narrowly missing out in the final of the Premiership. Rovers also won the John Player Trophy beating Hull 12–0 in the final at Boothferry Park but lost 12–29 to Hull in the final of the Yorkshire Cup.

On 25 August 1985, professional rugby league was played for the first time on the Isle of Man. The Charity Shield between Hull Kingston Rovers and Challenge Cup winners Wigan drew a crowd of 4,066 to the Douglas Bowl. The final score was 34–6 to Wigan.

In 1985/86, Millward took Rovers to their sixth win in the Yorkshire Cup before they were defeated in the John Player Final and the Challenge Cup Final at Wembley narrowly losing 15–14 to Castleford. This proved to be Rovers' last major final until 2015, as the team that had part dominated the English game faded away.

By the late 1980s, time had taken its toll on Craven Park stadium, following the Bradford City stadium fire, capacity was restricted and the cost of safety work spiraled. Major renovations were needed to bring it up to scratch. Large amounts of money were spent on the ground each year repairing sections but once one section was repaired another would fall into disrepair. In 1988/89, their last full season at Craven Park, Rovers were relegated to the 2nd Division and Millward decided to stand down as coach. Wright Properties Ltd purchased Craven Park from the club and the final game was played there on 9 April 1989.

A new stadium, New Craven Park, was built on a site off Preston Road. New Craven Park was officially opened on Sunday 24 September 1989 as Rovers beat Trafford Borough 48–8 in front of 8,500 spectators. Rovers started the new era convincingly, and were crowned Second Division champions with promotion back to the top flight.

George Fairbairn was brought in as a player-coach in 1992 for a record fee of £72,500. In 1994/95, Rovers were relegated to the third division despite finishing mid table.

=== 1996–2006: Summer era ===
In 1996, the first tier of British rugby league clubs played the inaugural Super League season and changed from a winter to a summer season. When the Super League competition had been proposed, it was suggested Hull Kingston Rovers should merge with Hull F.C. to form 'Humberside' and compete in the Super League. This was resisted but despite finishing top of the Third Division, they were not promoted. As the sport in Britain entered a new era, it would be ten years before Rovers rose again to the top level of the game.

Rovers were again crowned champions of the now renamed Second Division in 1996 and were this time promoted to the First Division. Hull Kingston Rovers entered administration in January 1997, and, but for the diligence of administrator Edward Klemka and the fund-raising activity of the Hull Kingston Rovers Supporters Group, the 1997 season would almost certainly have been their last. On the field though, Rovers won the Challenge Cup plate in its only season, beating Hunslet at Wembley 60–14. Then, against all odds, they finished second in the division the following season.

Rovers finished second in the league in 1998, and came close to a Grand Final spot with a Super League spot at stake. The Robins were expected to go one better in 1999 and topped the table for most of the season before their run ended and the final six games saw them drop from first place to sixth, missing out on a play-off place. Disappointment followed the year after when the Robins finished in seventh place in the league after a mid-season collapse and exited the play-offs in the first round.

After being in Administration from 1997 an acceptable buyer for the club was finally found in 2000, and the club came out of administration. Don Robinson took control in 2001 and Gary Wilkinson became head coach. Despite reaching the National Cup Final and finishing fourth in the league, Wilkinson made way for the club's first overseas coach, Steve Linnane.

Under Linnane, the Robins came within eighty minutes of their first Grand Final appearance in 2002, after a largely successful end to the season, while the arrival of former player Nick Halafihi as chief executive, boosted the club's off-field activities.

In 2004 the club appointed Mal Reilly as Director of Rugby and Martin Hall as first team coach after Steve Linnane's resignation. But Reilly left the club midway through the season, while Hall took the club to the play-off semi-final before leaving once the season had finished. Halafihi also left the club.

Harvey Howard was appointed first team coach and Paul Lakin appointed chief executive in late 2004. Howard was dismissed shortly before the Northern Rail Cup Final, which Rovers went on to win 18–16 over Castleford, with the Robins utilising the temporary player-coaching abilities of James Webster.

Permanently taking over from Howard was the former Toulouse coach, Justin Morgan. October 2005 who saw the club still in the National League, after failing to get past the semi-final stage of the National League One play-offs. Rovers also started a number of ground improvements, including the laying of a new pitch, and widening of the playing surface. They also made some significant signings for the 2006 season.

Up to that time unbeaten in their 2006 fixtures, in early June they were drawn to meet Super League side Warrington, in the quarter-final of the Challenge Cup. It was arguably their biggest fixture for some years. Against all the odds the Robins won, 40–36, their best result in the competition since their 1980 Challenge Cup win against local rivals Hull. This result also created a new club record of 18 consecutive wins. The victory set up a semi final tie against Super League leaders, St. Helens.

Rovers also progressed to the final of the Northern Rail Cup for the second successive season, against Leigh at Bloomfield Road, Blackpool on 16 July. Leigh won this game 22–18, thus ending Rovers' twenty four match unbeaten run. The club's Challenge Cup campaign also came to an abrupt halt, Rovers gamely succumbing 50–0 to triple-winning St Helens at the Galpharm Stadium, Huddersfield.

September 2006 saw Rovers crowned National League One Minor Premier winners, and qualify for an automatic place in the National League One play-off semi final at Craven Park against Widnes whom they beat 29–22 to reach the first Grand Final in their history, which they won 29–16, earning a place in the following season's Super League competition.

=== 2007–2014: Super League ===
After close-season signings and an overseas training camp, Rovers made a better than expected start to their first Super League campaign, winning their first two games – Wakefield Trinity at home and Huddersfield away. After suffering a reversal to Harlequins RL, they then had an away win (26–16) at Wigan, followed by a hard-fought victory at home to in-form Leeds, to go joint top of the early season table. However, inconsistent form, injuries and the effects of the first Super League sending-off (after 96 games) saw Rovers slip to near the bottom, despite a historic double away win over Wigan, and beating local rivals Hull at the Millennium Magic weekend. Improved late season results, including the safety-clinching win in the derby against Hull by the shock margin of 6–42 (played at the KC Stadium), ensured Super League status for another campaign.

Hull KR made significant changes to their squad for the 2008 season, which saw eleven new players brought in and a number of players released or sold. On 2 May the club announced that former captain James Webster had been released from the final six months of his contract due to a three to four-month lay off with a shoulder injury. He was replaced by new signing Michael Dobson, who was formerly a target of Hull. Canberra Raiders scrum half took squad number 26, and made his début against Harlequins RL on 25 May, scoring two tries. Rovers finished one point away from a play-off place.

2009 saw further consolidation of Hull KR's Super League status with away victories at St Helens, Wigan and Warrington in a seven match winning run, taking Rovers briefly to the top position in the table. A less successful spell followed, due to inconsistency, injuries and international calls, but by mid August 2009 Rovers were fourth in the table, five points clear of the next placed side.

2011 saw the end of Justin Morgan's reign as head coach and the club appointed Craig Sandercock as the new head coach for the 2012 season. Finishing 10th in his first season as a head coach and then making the play-offs in 2013, finishing 8th.

Despite making several big name signings for the 2014 season, Rovers failed to make any kind of impact in the league and with 8 games remaining they parted company with Sandercock, appointing assistant coach and ex-player Chris Chester as the new First-team coach of Hull KR. Chester could not steer the club to a playoff spot in his first 8 games in charge and they finished the season in 9th position.

=== 2015–present: Challenge Cup final and first Super League Grand Final ===
Chester took charge of his first full season as Hull Kingston Rovers Head Coach in 2015 and despite a mass clearout of the 2014 squad, he made several high-profile signings, notably, Ken Sio, Albert Kelly, Maurice Blair, Terry Campese, Mitch Allgood, Ryan Bailey and Darrell Goulding.

The club's first major final in 29 years ended in a record defeat along with the highest losing margin in a Challenge Cup final against Leeds by 50 points to nil.

Chester was sacked on 24 February 2016 just three matches into the 2016 season (two losses and a draw). James Webster took the reins, and led the Robins to four defeats in the following five games; the club also suffered a shock cup loss to Championship side Oldham R.L.F.C., as well as relegation to the Kingstone Press Championship in the 2016 Million Pound Game.

In September 2016, it was announced that Tim Sheens would be coaching the club for the next three years. In his first season, Rovers were promoted without having to play the Million Pound Game.

Over the next three seasons, Hull KR finished 10th, 11th and 11th. In the 2020 Super League season, the club only avoided relegation due to the COVID-19 pandemic and Toronto's expulsion from the league.

In the 2021 Super League season, Hull KR were predicted to fight against relegation after finishing the previous season on the bottom of the table. The club, however, finished in sixth place and qualified for the playoffs for the first time since 2013. In the elimination playoff against Warrington, Hull KR produced a major upset winning the game 19–0 and booking their place in the semi-final against Catalans Dragons. In the 2021 semi-final, Hull KR lost the match 28–10 at a sold out Stade Gilbert Brutus.

Hull Kingston Rovers started the 2022 Super League season looking to build on the events of 2021. Midway through the year, however, head coach Tony Smith announced he would be leaving at the end of the year. In May 2022, Hull KR reached the semi-final of the Challenge Cup were defeated by Huddersfield at Elland Road. In July 2022, Smith left Hull Kingston Rovers after a humiliating loss to Toulouse Olympique and he was replaced by interim head coach Danny McGuire. Hull Kingston Rovers would finish the year in 8th place on the table. In the 2023 Super League season, the club finished fourth on the table and qualified for the playoffs. They defeated Leigh in the elimination playoff to reach the semi-final against Wigan. Wigan would defeat Hull Kingston Rovers 42–12. The club also reached the final of the 2023 Challenge Cup but were defeated by Leigh in extra-time.

Hull KR finished second in the 2024 Super League table and reached their first Grand Final by defeating Warrington Wolves 10–8 in the play-off semi-finals. In the grand final, Hull Kingston Rovers would fall short of winning their first piece of silverware in 39 years losing 9–2 against Wigan. On 7 June 2025, Hull Kingston Rovers won their first major trophy in 40 years as they defeated Warrington 8–6 in the 2025 Challenge Cup final. Hull Kingston Rovers scored the winning try with less than two minutes remaining. They went on to complete the treble – topping the table and beating Wigan 24–6 in the 2025 Super League Grand Final.

Hull Kingston Rovers started the 2026 Super League season in the worst possible way, losing to the newly promoted York RLFC side 19–18. On 19 February 2026, Hull Kingston Rovers won the World Club Challenge for the first ever time defeating NRL premiership winners Brisbane 30–24.

== Stadium ==
=== 1895–1922: Craven Street ===
Hull KR first played on Craven Street in 1895 and played there until 1922 when they built and developed a bigger stadium at Old Craven Park with better facilities.

=== 1922–1989: Old Craven Park ===
Hull KR moved to Craven Park from their cramped Craven Street ground in 1922. The club purchased and developed a site behind the tram and bus depot on the eastern end of Holderness Road and it hosted its first game on 2 September 1922. Craven Park also hosted greyhound racing. Hull Kingston Rovers sold the ground to the Greyhound Racing Company in 1930s due to financial difficulties, securing a long-term lease to continue playing there.

In the early 1970s Hull Kingston Rovers purchased a site at Winchester Avenue with the aim of building a new stadium there. These plans never came to fruition and the site was later sold to a private developer. The profit made from this land was used to buy back Craven Park with greyhound racing continuing as a subsidiary concern. Following the Bradford City stadium fire, capacity was restricted and costs of safety work spiraled. With the club in debt the ground was sold to developers and the final game was played there on 9 April 1989.

=== 1989–present: Craven Park ===
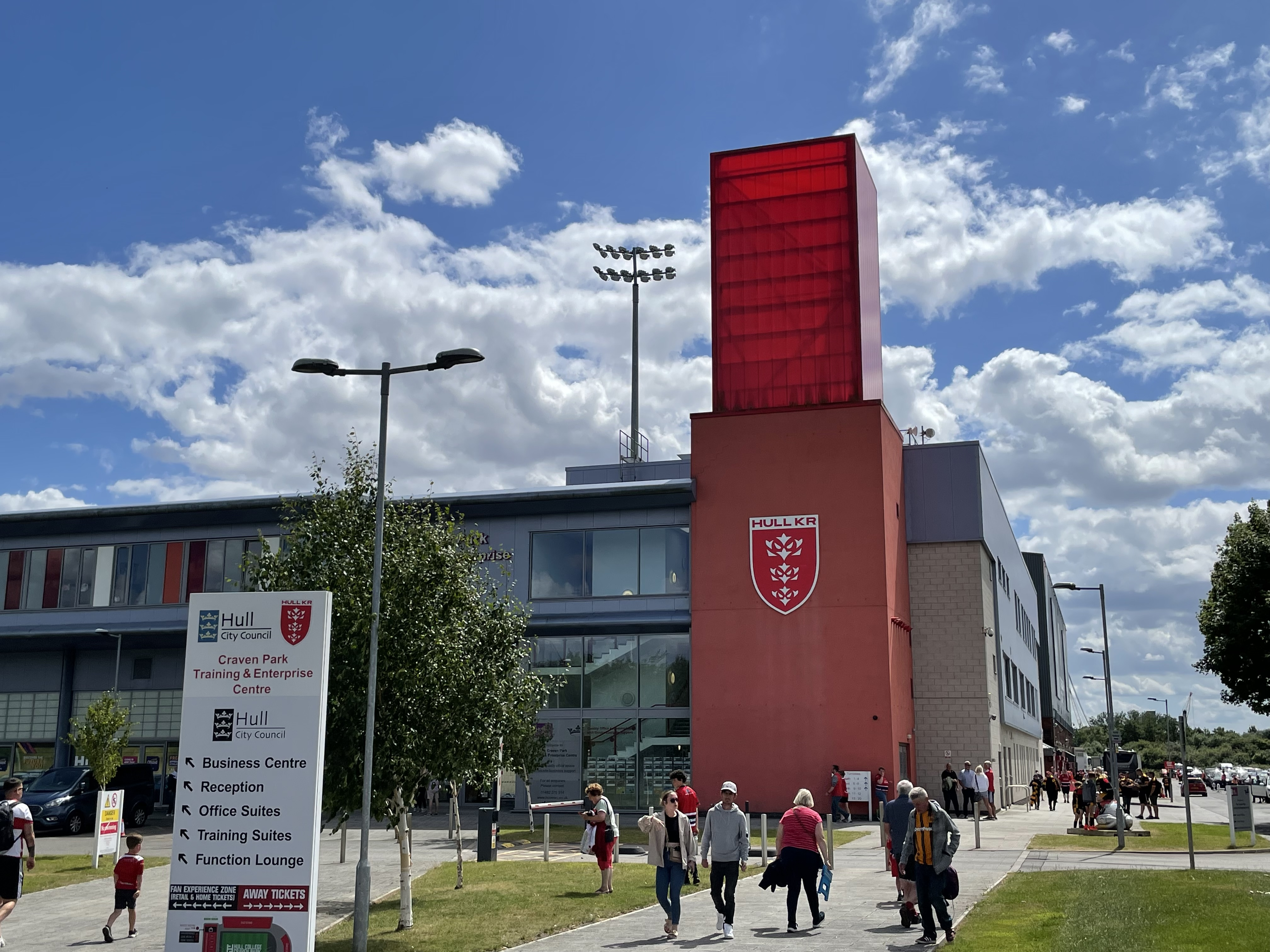

The club moved to the new ground in 1989 from the "Old" Craven Park which was sited on Holderness Road. The first match was played against Trafford Borough packing in a full capacity 8,500 crowd to watch.

In 2006 the ground and pitch were substantially improved as the club sought a return to the top flight of English rugby league. On 25 January 2014, Hull Kingston Rovers announced that it had secured a new stadium naming rights partnership with local communications provider, KC. Under a five-year agreement, Craven Park was renamed the KC Lightstream Stadium. After a corporate rebrand, the stadium was renamed again as KCOM Craven Park. In 2019 it was renamed the Hull College Craven Park Stadium.

A further renaming deal was signed in January 2022 when Hull-based company, Sewell Group, signed a two-year deal for rights to the stadium naming. The stadium to be known as the Sewell Group Craven Park.

On 28 March 2022 the club announced that they had purchased the ground from Kingston Community Developments Ltd (KCDL). KCDL had been the club's landlord since the 1990s. The club also announced that they have the option to buy up to 15 acres (6.07 ha) of land surrounding the ground from Hull City Council.

== Colours and badge ==
=== Colours ===
Hull Kingston Rovers have played in red jerseys throughout their history. From their inception the club's colours were agreed to be red jerseys with a blue band across the chest, white shorts and red socks.

=== Badge ===
This version of the club crest was used prior to 2022

Hull KR's badge was similar to city rivals Hull F.C. in that they did use the city coat of arms until its redesign in 2022, but KR's club badge is mainly red within a shield.

== Kit sponsors and manufacturers ==
Year	Kit manufacturer	Main shirt sponsor
1981–1983	Adidas	Rank Xerox
1983–1986	Adidas	Savoy Tyres
1986–1992	Adidas	Hanson White Print
1992–1993	Adidas	Riding Bitter
1993–1995	Le Coq Sportif	John Smiths
1995–1997	Le Coq Sportif	Wastewise
1998–2000	Avec	none
2001	Avec	Just 1 Look
2002	SDS	P and D
2003–2004	Patrick	P and D
2005	Kukri	P and D
2006	Carlotti	Platform 1
2007–2008	Carlotti	Lloyds TSB
2009	Kooga	Parasol
2010–2011	Kooga	Sportingbet
2012–2013	Burrda	Hirebase
2014–2015	Fi-Ta	ClearSky Business Support
2016	Fi-Ta	Brian Alfred
2017	XBlades	University of Hull
2018	XBlades	MLS Group
2019	XBlades	Motordepot
2020	Oxen	The Drain Company
2021	Oxen	Sporting Pay
2022–	Oxen	Connexin

== Rivalries ==
The club's main rivalry is with cross-city side Hull F.C. in which they contest the Hull Derby.

== 2026 squad ==
2027 Hull Kingston Rovers squad
First team squad			Coaching staff
(Australia) Tom Amone – PR; (New Zealand) Salesi Ataata – PR; (England) James Batchelor (vc) – SR; (England) Noah Booth – CE, WG, FB; (England) Jack Broadbent – CE, FB, WG, SO; (England) Jack Charles – SO, SH; (England) Tom Davies – WG; (England) Frankie Dearlove – SR; (France) Jordan Dezaria – PR, SR, LF; (England) Oliver Gildart – CE; (Ireland) Louix Gorman – WG, FB; (New Zealand) Moala Graham-Taufa – CE, WG	(England) Dean Hadley – SR, LF, PR; (Australia) Eddie Hampson – SR; (New Zealand) Peta Hiku – CE, WG, FB; (England) Flynn Holden – FB, WG; (England) Harvey Horne – WG; (England) Rio Kassim – CE, SR; (Australia) Karl Lawton – HK, LF, SR; (England) Mikey Lewis – SO, SH, FB (gk); (England) Bill Leyland – HK; (England) Jez Litten – HK, SH; (Scotland) Sam Luckley – PR, LF, SR	(Samoa) Tyrone May – SH, CE, SO; (England) Elliot Middlemas – WG; (England) Elliot Minchella (c) – LF; (France) Arthur Mourgue – FB, SH, SO (gk); (England) Declan Murphy – FB; (Australia) Brock Parker – PR; (England) Jumah Sambou – CE, WG; (Samoa) Sauaso Sue – PR, LF, SR; (England) Cobie Wainhouse – PR; (England) Ryan Westerman – CE; (Australia) Jai Whitbread – PR; (England) Tom Whitehead – SR, LF	Head coach: (New Zealand) Nathan Cayless; Assistant coaches: (England) David Hodgson; (England) Luke Gale; Legend: (c) Captain(s); (vc) Vice-captain(s); (red card) = suspended; = injured; (gk) = Goal kicker

== 2026 transfers ==
=== Gains ===
Player	Club	Contract	Date
(Australia) Tom Amone	Canterbury Bulldogs (Note: Amone also spent a large portion of the 2025 season on loan to Castleford Tigers.)	3 years	April 2025
(England) Jumah Sambou	Oldham R.L.F.C.	3 years	May 2025
(England) Declan Murphy	Salford Red Devils	3 years	August 2025
(England) Cobie Wainhouse	Hull F.C.	2 years	August 2025
(England) Jack Charles	Hull F.C.	4 years	October 2025
(France) Jordan Dezaria	Catalans Dragons	3 years	October 2025
(England) Tom Whitehead	Warrington Wolves	3 years	November 2025
(Australia) Karl Lawton	North Queensland Cowboys	3 years	December 2025
(England) Ryan Hampshire	Featherstone Rovers	End of season	April 2026
(Tonga) Tevita Pangai Junior	SC Leucate	End of season	May 2026
(England) Ryan Westerman	Hull F.C.	End of season	June 2026
(England) Flynn Holden	Warrington Wolves	2 1/2 years	June 2026

=== Losses ===
Player	Club	Contract	Date
(England) Neil Tchamambe	Wakefield Trinity	2 years	March 2025
(New Zealand) Jared Waerea-Hargreaves	N/A	Retirement	April 2025
(England) Kye Armstrong	Released		September 2025
(England) Michael McIlorum	N/A	Retirement	September 2025
(Jamaica) Ajahni Wallace	Toulouse Olympique	1 year	October 2025
(England) Danny Richardson	York Knights	2 years	October 2025
(Australia) Phoenix Laulu-Togaga'e	Catalans Dragons	1 year	October 2025
(England) Lennie Ellis	Sheffield Eagles	1 year	October 2025
(Nigeria) Eribe Doro	Bradford Bulls	2 years	October 2025
(England) Leo Tennison	York Knights	1 year	November 2025
(Australia) Kelepi Tanginoa	Warrington Wolves	2 years	November 2025
(England) Jack Brown	Castleford Tigers	1 1/2 years	June 2026

==== Loans out ====
Player	Club	Loan period	Date
(England) Leon Ruan	Bradford Bulls	End of season	December 2025
(England) Jumah Sambou	Widnes Vikings	End of season	January 2026
(France) Jordan Dezaria	St Helens	One week	March 2026
(England) Bill Leyland	St Helens	One week	March 2026
(England) Lee Kershaw	Huddersfield Giants	One week	May 2026
(England) Tom Whitehead	Doncaster R.L.F.C.	End of season	June 2026
(England) Zach Fishwick	Batley Bulldogs	Three weeks	July 2026
(England) Harvey Horne	Doncaster R.L.F.C.	End of season	July 2026
(Ireland) Louix Gorman	Salford RLFC	One week	August 2026
(England) Declan Murphy	Salford RLFC	One week	August 2026

== Notable former players ==
=== Greatest ever team ===
In 2012, Hull KR supporters voted for the best players in the club's history. The players who received the most votes in each position were named in the club's "Greatest Ever Hull KR 13".

No.	Player name
1	George Fairbairn
2	Steve Hubbard
3	Mike Smith
4	Gary Prohm
5	Clive Sullivan (MBE)
6	Roger Millward (MBE)
7	Gordon Smith
8	John Millington
9	Peter Flanagan
10	Len Casey
11	Phil Lowe
12	Paul Fletcher
13	Gavin Miller
Coach	Roger Millward (MBE)

=== Other notable players ===
These players have either won Challenge Cup, Rugby Football League Championship, Yorkshire Cup, Yorkshire League; played during Super League; received a Testimonial match; been international representatives before, or after, their time at Hull Kingston Rovers; or are notable outside of rugby league. For a comprehensive list of players, see List of Hull Kingston Rovers players. Figures in (brackets) are total club appearances.

- Allan Agar
- Chris Anderson
- Gilbert Austin (348) 1919 – 1928
- Damian Ball
- Dwayne Barker
- Arthur Beetson
- Edwin "Ted" Bonner (#13) (72) circa 1962
- Kerry Boustead
- B. Britton (332) circa 1924 – circa 1930
- Mark Broadhurst
- Matty Brooks
- Arthur Bunting (237) 1959 – circa 1968
- Brian Burwell (#4) (93) circa 1962
- George Carmichael captain circa 1936
- Leslie Chamberlain
- Josh Charnley
- Chris Chester
- Dean Clark
- Geoffrey Clarkson
- Joel Clinton
- Ben Cockayne
- Liam Colbon
- J. Cook (365) 1920 – 1931
- Matt Cook
- Paul Cooke
- Colin Cooper (#7) circa-1968
- Philip "Phil" Coupland circa-1968
- Robin "Bob" Coverdale (161) 1957 – circa 1963
- Mick Crane
- H. "Scrubber" Dale (305) circa 1929 – circa 1937
- Andy Dannatt
- Michael Dixon
- Michael Dobson
- John Dorahy
- Jim Drake (78) 1961 – 1965
- Paul Eastwood
- David "Dave" Elliott (300) circa 1962 – 1968
- Andrew Ellis
- Asuquo "Zook" Ema circa 1983 (Testimonial match 1990)
- Craig Farrell
- Daniel Fitzhenry
- Paul Fletcher (Testimonial match 1998)
- Byron Ford
- Leslie "Les" Foster (#8) circa-1968
- Neil Fox
- Peter Fox (born 1984)
- Ben Galea
- Jim Gannon
- Stanley Gene
- Jon Goddard
- Blake Green
- Mike Hall
- Graeme Hallas
- Ian Hardman
- Lewis Harris, 1920s.
- Robert "Bob" Harris (#5) (128) 1959 – c 1964
- Danny Hill
- Dale Holdstock
- Roy Holdstock
- Chaz I'Anson
- Fred Jowett
- Cyril Kellett (#1) (382) 1957 – 1967
- Bryn Knowelden
- Sam Latus
- Tracey Lazenby
- Paul Longstaff (#5) circa-1968
- Rhys Lovegrove
- John Lydiat (Testimonial match 1982)
- Terrence "Terry" Major (#3) (274) 1959 – circa 1969
- J. McIntyre (303) circa 1920 – circa 1925
- Wilfred "Wilf" McWatt (323)
- Frankie Mariano
- Brian Mennell (#10) début in 1963–64 Challenge Cup Final circa-1968
- Luke Menzies
- Gavin Miller
- John Millington
- John Moore (430) 1962 – (Testimonial match 1973)
- Iain Morrison
- Gareth Morton
- Peter Murphy (#12) (36) circa 1962
- Scott Murrell
- Jason Netherton
- Kirk Netherton
- Clint Newton
- Bryan Niebling
- Mark O'Neill
- Jonty Parkin
- Graham 'The Cornish Express' Paul (#2) (197) 1958 – 1966
- Dave Page
- Gareth Price
- Gary Prohm
- Andy Raleigh
- Joseph "Joe" Ramsden (348)
- Michael Ratu
- Dan Rees
- Emlyn Richards (109) 1945 – 1952
- Leroy Rivett
- Ian Robinson (Testimonial match 1984)
- Michael Smith
- Bright Sodje
- John "Jack" T. Spamer (440) circa 1928 – circa 1938
- Scott Spaven
- Jon Steel
- David Stephenson
- Francis Stephenson
- Lynton Stott
- Anthony Sullivan 1988 – 1991
- Whetu Taewa
- Ryan Tandy
- David Tangata-Toa
- Latham Tawhai
- John Taylor
- Scott Taylor
- Len Trump
- Derek 'Rocky' Turner (141) 1950 – 1955
- Yank van Rooyen circa-1920
- Michael Vella
- David Wainwright (#1) circa-1968
- Chev Walker
- Danny Ward
- Dave Watson
- Kevin Watson
- Liam Watts
- Jake Webster
- James Webster
- Pat Weisner
- Kris Welham
- C.T. Westerdale (319) circa 1924 – circa 1930
- Scott Wheeldon
- Jon Wilkin
- Desi Williams
- Dave Wilson

== Coaching team ==
Nat	Staff name	Position	Previous clubs
(Australia)	Willie Peters	Head Coach	
(Australia)	James Webster	Assistant coach	Balmain Tigers, Widnes Vikings
(England)	David Hodgson	Assistant coach	Halifax, Wigan Warriors, Salford City Reds
(England)	Jamie Elkaleh	Performance coach	Salford City Reds, Warrington Wolves
(Republic of Ireland)	Shane Carney	Head of Strength & Conditioning	Hull F.C.
(Scotland)	Dan Ramsden	Head of physiotherapy	Bradford Bulls
(England)	Alan Fellows	Kit Man	
(England)	Sue Thompson	Player Welfare Manager	

=== Past coaches ===
- Lewis Harris
- Bryn Knowelden 1952–1955
- Colin Hutton 1957–1970
- Johnny Whiteley 1970–1972
- Harry Poole 1975–1977
- Roger Millward 1977–1991
- George Fairbairn 1991–1994
- Steve Crooks 1994–1997
- Dave Harrison 1997–2000
- Gary Wilkinson 2000–2002
- Steve Linnane 2002–2004
- Martin Hall 2003–2004
- Mal Reilly 2003–2004
- Harvey Howard 2004–2005
- Justin Morgan 2005–2011
- Craig Sandercock 2012–2014
- Chris Chester 2014–2016
- James Webster 2016–2017
- Tim Sheens 2017–2019
- James Webster (caretaker) 2019
- Tony Smith 2019–2022
- Danny McGuire (interim) 2022
- Willie Peters 2023–2026

== Seasons ==
=== Super League era ===
Season	League									Play-offs	Challenge Cup	Other competitions		Name	Tries	Name	Points
Season	Division	P	W	D	L	F	A	Pts (Note: Win percentage for 2020 and 2021)	Pos	Play-offs	Challenge Cup	Other competitions		Top try scorer		Top point scorer	
1996	Division Two	22	21	0	1	1009	294	42	1st		R4						
1997	Division One	20	8	1	11	440	481	17	8th		QF						
1998	Division One	30	20	1	9	748	480	41	2nd	Lost in Week 3	R5						
1999	Northern Ford Premiership	28	19	1	8	573	425	39	6th		R5						
2000	Northern Ford Premiership	28	17	1	10	583	481	35	7th	Lost in Week 2	R4						
2001	Northern Ford Premiership	28	16	2	10	555	450	34	7th	Lost in Week 2	R4						
2002	Northern Ford Premiership	27	18	1	8	715	468	37	4th	Lost in Week 3	R5	Championship Cup	RU				
2003	National League One	18	10	0	8	401	373	20	4th	Lost in preliminary final	R5						
2004	National League One	18	10	0	8	466	428	20	3rd	Lost in semi-final	R3	Championship Cup	RU				
2005	National League One	18	13	0	5	589	389	26	3rd	Lost in semi-final	R4	Championship Cup	W				
2006	National League One	18	16	0	2	705	338	32	1st	Won in final	SF	Championship Cup	RU				
2007	Super League	27	10	0	17	491	723	20	11th		R3						
2008	Super League	27	11	1	15	564	713	23	7th		QF						
2009	Super League	27	17	1	9	650	516	35	4th	Lost in preliminary semi-final	QF						
2010	Super League	27	14	1	12	653	632	29	7th	Lost in preliminary semi-final	R4						
2011	Super League	27	14	0	13	713	692	28	7th	Lost in Elimination Playoffs	QF						
2012	Super League	27	10	1	16	753	729	21	10th		R4						
2013	Super League	27	13	0	14	642	760	26	8th	Lost in Elimination Playoffs	R5						
2014	Super League	27	10	34	14	627	665	23	9th		R4						
2015	Super League	23	9	0	14	534	646	18	10th		RU						
2015	The Qualifiers	7	7	0	0	234	118	14	1st		RU						
2016	Super League	23	6	2	15	486	610	14	11th	Lost in Million Pound Game	R5						
2016	The Qualifiers	7	4	0	3	235	142	8	4th	Lost in Million Pound Game	R5						
2017	Championship	23	19	1	3	850	385	39	1st		R6						
2017	The Qualifiers	7	5	0	2	166	158	10	3rd		R6						
2018	Super League	23	8	1	14	476	582	17	10th		R6						
2018	The Qualifiers	7	5	0	2	197	162	10	3rd		R6						
2019	Super League	29	10	0	19	548	768	20	11th		QF						
2020	Super League	17	3	0	14	290	526	17.65	11th		QF						
2021	Super League	20	10	0	10	497	458	50.00	6th	Lost in semi-final	R6 (Note: Officially round 3 due to the competitions temporary restructure in 2021.)						
2022	Super League	27	12	0	15	498	608	24	8th		SF						
2023	Super League	27	16	0	11	589	498	32	4th	Lost in semi-final	RU						
2024	Super League	27	21	0	6	719	326	42	2nd	Lost in Grand Final	SF						
2025	Super League	27	22	0	5	786	292	44	1st	Won in Grand Final	W						
2026	Super League	27	16	0	11	748	503	32	6th	Lost in Elimination Playoffs	RU						

== Honours ==
=== League ===
- First Division / Super League

Winners (6): 1922–23, 1924–25, 1978–79, 1983–84, 1984–85, 2025

- League Leaders' Shield:

Winners (1): 2025

- Second Division / Championship

Winners (2): 2006, 2017

RFL Championship Leaders' Shield

Winners (2): 2006, 2017

- RFL Yorkshire League

Winners (2): 1924–25, 1925–26

- Eastern Division Championship

Winners (1): 1962–63

=== Cup ===
- Challenge Cup

Winners (2): 1979–80, 2025

- Premiership

Winners (2): 1980–81, 1983–84

- League Cup

Winners (1): 1984–85

- BBC2 Floodlit Trophy

Winners (1): 1977–78

- RFL Yorkshire Cup

Winners (7): 1920–21, 1929–30, 1966–67, 1967–68, 1971–72, 1974–75, 1985–86

- RFU Yorkshire Cup

Winners (1): 1897

- Championship Cup

Winners (1): 2005

- Challenge Cup Plate

Winners (1): 1997

=== International ===
- World Club Challenge

Winners (1): 2026

== Club records ==
=== Match records ===
- Goals: 16 by Rhyse Martin vs Lock Lane, 6 February 2026
- Tries: 11 by George Henry 'Tich' West vs Brooklands Rovers, 4 March 1905
- Points: 53 (11 tries, 10 goals) by George Henry 'Tich' West vs Brooklands Rovers, 4 March 1905 (a rugby league world record)

=== Season records ===
- Goals: 199 by Mike Fletcher, 1989–90
- Tries: 45 by Gary Prohm, 1984–85
- Points: 450 by Mike Fletcher, 1989–90

=== Career records ===
- Goals: 1,268 by Mike Fletcher, 1987–98
- Tries: 207 by Roger Millward, 1966–80
- Points: 2,760 by Mike Fletcher, 1987–98
- Appearances: 481 by Mike Smith, 1974–1991

=== Other records ===
- Highest score: 104–0 vs Lock Lane, 6 February 2026
- Highest against: 6–84 vs Wigan (KCOM Craven Park), 1 April 2013
- Attendance record: 22,282 vs Hull F.C. (Craven Park), 7 October 1922
- Attendance record: 16,084 vs Hull F.C. (Craven Park), 20 April 1984 (post-war record)
- Attendance record: 18,000 vs Hull F.C. (Craven Street), 11 March 1922
- Attendance record: 27,670 vs Hull F.C. (Boothferry Park), 3 April 1953
- Attendance record: 12,090 vs Hull F.C (KCOM Craven Park), 30 March 2018 (current stadium record)
- All-time attendance record: 95,000 vs Hull F.C. (Wembley Stadium), 3 May 1980 – 1980 Challenge Cup Final
- Attendance record vs international touring team: 13,000 vs Australasia (Craven Street), 24 September 1921 – 1921–22 Kangaroo Tour
- Longest sequence of appearances: 190 by Gilbert Austin, 1918–19 to 1923–24
- International appearances: 45 plus 2 as sub by Roger Millward between 1966 and 1978

== Women's team ==
The Hull KR women's team was established in 2019. They played their first match, a 40–8 win over Rochdale, in April. In 2019, they competed in League 1 and made their Women's Challenge Cup debut with a 24–14 loss to Halifax in the first round. In 2021, Hull KR defeated Dewsbury Moor Ladies in the League 1 Grand Final to earn promotion to the Championship and in November it was announced that the team, which had until that time been supported by the Hull KR Community Trust, was to become integrated into the club's structure. In 2022, the team reached the semi-finals of the League Cup by defeating Hull FC in the first derby fixture between the two sides. They had previously been due to face each other in the cancelled 2020 Challenge Cup. In the 2023 season, Hull KR suffered a 122–0 defeat to York Valkyrie in the group stage of Challenge Cup, but then won the League Cup with a 22–6 win over Stanningley in the final. They also finished top of the Championship and defeated Oulton Raidettes 30–16 in the Grand Final but were denied the opportunity for promotion due to the restructuring of the national pyramid in 2024. In January 2024, it was announced that they would be in the 2024 Northern Women's Championship.
