= 2007 Widnes Vikings season =

- National League One Rank: 2nd
- Play-off result: Runners Up
- Challenge Cup: Round Four
- National League Cup: Winners
- 2007 record: Wins: 16; draws: 0; losses: 2

Team information
- Coach: Steve McCormack
- Stadium: Halton Stadium
- Avg. attendance: 3,329 (Excluding Challenge Cup)
- High attendance: 6,006 (vs. Wigan Warriors, 1 April)
- Low attendance: 1,606 (vs. Normanton Knights, 11 March)
← 2006	List of seasons	2008 →

This article is about the 2007 season of the Widnes Vikings.

== National League One table ==
Position	Club	Played	Won	Drawn	Lost	Pts for	Pts agst	B.P.	Points
1	Castleford Tigers	18	17	0	1	860	247	0	51
2	Widnes Vikings	18	16	0	2	740	220	2	50
3	Halifax	18	12	0	6	616	421	2	38
4	Whitehaven	18	11	0	7	474	342	5	38
5	Leigh Centurions	18	9	0	9	454	474	4	31
6	Sheffield Eagles	18	6	1	11	414	527	4	24
7	Dewsbury Rams	18	5	0	13	346	572	6	19
8	Batley Bulldogs	18	5	1	12	372	645	2	19
9	Rochdale Hornets	18	3	0	15	302	700	1	10
10	Doncaster Lakers	18	5	0	13	348	778	1	10

== Players ==
Player	D.O.B.	Appearances	Tries	Goals	F Goals	Points
Bob Beswick	8/12/84	32	7	0	0	28
Damien Blanch	24/5/83	27	19	0	0	76
Adam Bowman	12/11/87	2	1	0	0	4
Andy Bracek	21/3/84	3	1	0	0	4
Daryl Cardiss	13/7/77	6	2	0	0	8
Mick Cassidy	8/7/73	28	1	0	0	4
Gavin Dodd	28/2/81	30	17	28	0	124
Lee Doran	23/3/81	32	5	0	0	20
Rob Draper	30/11/87	3	2	0	0	8
Dean Gaskell	12/4/83	20	11	0	0	44
Scott Grix	1/5/84	32	21	0	0	84
Ben Harrison	24/2/88	3	0	0	0	0
Jordan James	24/5/80	33	6	0	0	24
Andy Kain	2/8/82	9	3	0	0	12
Andy Kirk	2/8/82	17	8	0	0	32
Toa Kohe-Love	2/12/76	25	17	0	0	68
Danny Lima	27/7/75	5	0	0	0	0
Dennis Moran	22/1/77	28	23	0	0	92
Mike Morrison	9/9/87	3	0	0	0	0
Richie Myler	21/5/90	2	0	0	0	0
Mick Nanyn	3/6/82	29	28	161	0	434
Paul Noone	22/4/81	30	6	2	0	28
Joel Penny	22/1/80	15	10	0	0	40
Gareth Price	28/6/80	18	0	0	0	0
Adam Sidlow	25/10/87	4	0	0	0	0
Mark Smith	18/8/81	31	14	0	0	56
Aaron Summers	11/8/81	24	3	0	0	12
Joel Tomkins	21/3/87	8	2	0	0	8
Ian Webster	16/11/86	27	10	0	0	40
Oliver Wilkes	2/5/80	33	15	0	0	60

== League results ==
LEGEND
Win
Draw
Loss

Date	Competition	Vrs	H/A	Result	Score	Tries	Goals	Field goals	Att	Lineup	Subs
5/4/07	2007 National League 1	Leigh Centurions	H	W	46-12	Grix (2), Blanch, Kohe-Love, Moran (3), Dodd	Nanyn 7/9	N/A	3,792	Scott Grix, Damien Blanch, Toa Kohe-Love, Mick Nanyn, Gavin Dodd, Dennis Moran, Andy Kain, Jordan James, Mark Smith, Oliver Wilkes, Lee Doran, Paul Noone, Bob Beswick	Aaron Summers, Mick Cassidy, Daryl Cardiss, Gareth Price
9/4/07	2007 National League 1	Rochdale Hornets	A	W	18-40	Blanch, Moran, Nanyn (3), Webster, Dodd	Nanyn 6/9	N/A	1,485	Scott Grix, Damien Blanch, Toa Kohe-Love, Mick Nanyn, Gavin Dodd, Dennis Moran, Andy Kain, Jordan James, Mark Smith, Oliver Wilkes, Lee Doran, Paul Noone, Bob Beswick	Aaron Summers, Ian Webster, Andy Kirk (Not Used), Gareth Price
13/4/07	2007 National League 1	Sheffield Eagles	A	W	4-46	Beswick, Nanyn (2), Dodd, Moran, Smith, James, Blanch	Nanyn 7/8	N/A	1,211	Scott Grix, Damien Blanch, Toa Kohe-Love, Mick Nanyn, Gavin Dodd, Dennis Moran, Ian Webster, Jordan James, Mark Smith, Oliver Wilkes, Lee Doran, Paul Noone, Bob Beswick	Aaron Summers, Mick Cassidy, Andy Kirk, Gareth Price
26/4/07	2007 National League 1	Halifax RLFC	H	W	48-12	Nanyn (3), Grix, Smith, Moran, Kohe-Love, Blanch, James	Nanyn 6/10	N/A	3,042	Scott Grix, Damien Blanch, Toa Kohe-Love, Mick Nanyn, Gavin Dodd, Dennis Moran, Ian Webster, Jordan James, Mark Smith, Oliver Wilkes, Lee Doran, Paul Noone, Bob Beswick	Aaron Summers, Mick Cassidy, Andy Kirk, Gareth Price
6/5/07	2007 National League 1	Batley Bulldogs	H	W	66-14	Moran (3), Noone, Dodd, Grix (2), Nanyn, Kirk, Wilkes, Smith	Nanyn 11/11	N/A	2,753	Scott Grix, Damien Blanch, Andy Kirk, Mick Nanyn, Gavin Dodd, Dennis Moran, Ian Webster, Jordan James, Mark Smith, Oliver Wilkes, Lee Doran, Paul Noone, Bob Beswick	Aaron Summers, Gareth Price, Dean Gaskell, Mick Cassidy
17/5/07	2007 National League 1	Castleford Tigers	A	W	20-44	Dodd, Smith (2), Jordan James, Webster, Blanch (2), Beswick	Nanyn 6/9	N/A	6,007	Scott Grix, Damien Blanch, Andy Kirk, Mick Nanyn, Gavin Dodd, Dennis Moran, Ian Webster, Mick Cassidy, Mark Smith, Oliver Wilkes, Lee Doran, Paul Noone, Bob Beswick	Aaron Summers, Jordan James, Dean Gaskell, Gareth Price
3/6/07	2007 National League 1	Sheffield Eagles	H	W	56-10	Wilkes (3), James, Nanyn (3), Moran, Dodd, Penny	Mick Nanyn 8/10	N/A	2,837	Gavin Dodd, Damien Blanch, Andy Kirk, Mick Nanyn, Dean Gaskell, Dennis Moran, Ian Webster, Mick Cassidy, Mark Smith, Oliver Wilkes, Lee Doran, Aaron Summers, Bob Beswick	Joel Penny, Danny Lima, Jordan James, Gareth Price
10/6/07	2007 National League 1	Doncaster Lakers	A	W	4-90	Dodd (3), Blanch (3), Wilkes (2), Penny (3), Kirk, Summers (2), Gaskell, Grix	Dodd 13/16	N/A	1,248	Scott Grix, Dean Gaskell, Andy Kirk, Damien Blanch, Gavin Dodd, Dennis Moran, Joel Penny, Mick Cassidy, Mark Smith, Oliver Wilkes, Lee Doran, Aaron Summers, Bob Beswick	Ian Webster, Danny Lima, Jordan James, Gareth Price
14/6/07	2007 National League 1	Halifax RLFC	A	L	12-6	Webster	Nanyn 1/1	N/A	2,412	Scott Grix, Damien Blanch, Toa Kohe-Love, Mick Nanyn, Gavin Dodd, Dennis Moran, Joel Penny, Mick Cassidy, Mark Smith, Oliver Wilkes, Lee Doran, Paul Noone, Bob Beswick	Aaron Summers, Jordan James, Andy Kirk, Ian Webster
1/7/07	2007 National League 1	Rochdale Hornets	H	W	32-0	Dodd, Gaskell, Wilkes, Grix, Penny, Webster	Nanyn 4/6	N/A	4,879	Scott Grix, Dean Gaskell, Toa Kohe-Love, Mick Nanyn, Gavin Dodd, Dennis Moran, Joel Penny, Jordan James, Mark Smith, Gareth Price, Lee Doran, Oliver Wilkes, Bob Beswick	Ian Webster, Mick Cassidy, Andy Kirk, Danny Lima
5/7/07	2007 National League 1	Dewsbury Rams	A	W	10-50	Gaskell (3), Penny, James, Grix, Moran, Nanyn, Kohe-Love, Summers	Nanyn 5/10	N/A	1,885	Scott Grix, Dean Gaskell, Toa Kohe-Love, Nanyn, Gavin Dodd, Dennis Moran, Joel Penny, Mick Cassidy, Mark Smith, Oliver Wilkes, Lee Doran, Paul Noone, Bob Beswick	Aaron Summers, Jordan James, Ian Webster, Gareth Price
22/7/07	2007 National League 1	Whitehaven R.L.F.C.	H	W	16-14	Moran, Blanch, Nanyn	Nanyn 2/3	N/A	3,299	Scott Grix, Damien Blanch, Toa Kohe-Love, Mick Nanyn, Dean Gaskell, Dennis Moran, Ian Webster, Mick Cassidy, Mark Smith, Oliver Wilkes, Lee Doran, Paul Noone, Bob Beswick	Aaron Summers, Jordan James, Andy Kirk, Gareth Price
29/7/07	2007 National League 1	Doncaster R.L.F.C.	H	W	40-18	Doran (2), Nanyn, Blanch, Kohe-Love (2), Wilkes, Dodd	Nanyn 4/8	N/A	2,607	Scott Grix, Damien Blanch, Toa Kohe-Love, Mick Nanyn, Dean Gaskell, Dennis Moran, Joel Penny, Jordan James, Ian Webster, Aaron Summers, Lee Doran, Joel Tomkins, Paul Noone	Mick Cassidy, Oliver Wilkes, Gavin Dodd, Gareth Price
2/8/07	2007 National League 1	Leigh Centurions	A	W	0-38	Tomkins, Nanyn (3), Beswick, Gaskell, Grix	Mick Nanyn 5/8	N/A	3,095	Scott Grix, Dean Gaskell, Toa Kohe-Love, Mick Nanyn, Gavin Dodd, Dennis Moran, Joel Penny, Mick Cassidy, Mark Smith, Oliver Wilkes, Joel Tomkins, Paul Noone, Bob Beswick	Aaron Summers, Jordan James, Ian Webster, Gareth Price
12/8/07	2007 National League 1	Dewsbury Rams	H	W	48-12	Blanch (2), Nanyn, Penny (2), Noone, Dodd, Kohe-Love	Nanyn 8/9	N/A	2,853	Gavin Dodd, Damien Blanch, Toa Kohe-Love, Mick Nanyn, Dean Gaskell, Scott Grix, Joel Penny, Mick Cassidy, Mark Smith, Oliver Wilkes, Joel Tomkins, Paul Noone, Bob Beswick	Aaron Summers, Jordan James, Ian Webster, Lee Doran
16/8/07	2007 National League 1	Castleford Tigers	H	L	18-24	Nanyn, Kohe-Love, Dodd	Nanyn 3/4	N/A	4,598	Scott Grix, Damien Blanch, Toa Kohe-Love, Mick Nanyn, Dean Gaskell, Dennis Moran, Joel Penny, Mick Cassidy, Mark Smith, Oliver Wilkes, Joel Tomkins, Paul Noone, Bob Beswick	Aaron Summers, Jordan James, Ian Webster, Gavin Dodd
2/9/07	2007 National League 1	Whitehaven R.L.F.C.	A	W	18-22	Grix, Blanch, Dodd (2)	Nanyn 3/5	N/A	2,360	Scott Grix, Damien Blanch, Toa Kohe-Love, Mick Nanyn, Gavin Dodd, Dennis Moran, Joel Penny, Aaron Summers, Mark Smith, Oliver Wilkes, Joel Tomkins, Paul Noone, Bob Beswick	Mick Cassidy, Jordan James, Ian Webster, Lee Doran
9/9/07	2007 National League 1	Batley Bulldogs	A	W	18-34	Nanyn, Tomkins, Penny (2), Doran, Wilkes	Nanyn 5/6	N/A	1,139	Gavin Dodd, Damien Blanch, Andy Kirk, Mick Nanyn, Dean Gaskell, Scott Grix, Joel Penny, Aaron Summers, Mark Smith, Oliver Wilkes, Joel Tomkins, Paul Noone, Bob Beswick	Mick Cassidy, Jordan James, Richie Myler, Lee Doran
20/9/07	2007 National League 1 Play-offs - Qualifying Semi-Final	Castleford Tigers	A	L	26-8	Nanyn	Nanyn 2/3	N/A	6,179	Scott Grix, Damien Blanch, Toa Kohe-Love, Mick Nanyn, Gavin Dodd, Dennis Moran, Ian Webster, Aaron Summers, Mark Smith, Oliver Wilkes, Joel Tomkins, Paul Noone, Bob Beswick	Mick Cassidy, Jordan James, Richie Myler, Lee Doran
20/8/07	2007 National League 1 Play-offs - Final Eliminator	Halifax RLFC	H	W	36-24	Noone, Smith (2), Grix, Beswick	Nanyn 8/8	N/A	3,347	Scott Grix, Damien Blanch, Toa Kohe-Love, Mick Nanyn, Gavin Dodd, Dennis Moran, Joel Penny, Mick Cassidy, Mark Smith, Oliver Wilkes, Joel Tomkins, Paul Noone, Bob Beswick	Ian Webster, Jordan James, Adam Sidlow, Lee Doran
7/10/07	2007 National League 1 Play-offs - Grand Final	Castleford Tigers	Neutral (Headingley Stadium)	L	42-10	Nanyn, Wilkes	Nanyn 1/2	N/A	20,814	Scott Grix, Damien Blanch, Toa Kohe-Love, Mick Nanyn, Gavin Dodd, Dennis Moran, Joel Penny, Mick Cassidy, Mark Smith, Oliver Wilkes, Joel Tomkins, Paul Noone, Bob Beswick	Aaron Summers, Jordan James, Ian Webster, Lee Doran

== Northern Rail Cup Results ==
Group 6
Team	Pld	W	D	L	BP	PD	Pts
Widnes Vikings	6	5	0	1	0	186	15
Celtic Crusaders	6	4	0	2	0	−20	12
Leigh Centurions	6	3	0	3	2	72	11
London Skolars	6	0	0	6	0	−238	0

Date	Competition	Vrs	H/A	Result	Score	Tries	Goals	Field goals	Att	Lineup	Subs
9/2/07	2007 Northern Rail Cup - Group 6	Celtic Crusaders	A	W	6-56	Nanyn, Grix (3), Beswick, Moran (2), Smith, Kohe-Love, Blanch	Nanyn 8/9, Moran 0/1	N/A	452	Scott Grix, Damien Blanch, Toa Kohe-Love, Mick Nanyn, Gavin Dodd, Dennis Moran, Andy Kain, Mick Cassidy, Mark Smith, Andy Bracek, Lee Doran, Paul Noone, Bob Beswick	Ian Webster, Oliver Wilkes, Jordan James, Ben Harrison
18/2/07	2007 Northern Rail Cup - Group 6	Leigh Centurions	H	W	34-20	Dodd (2), Kohe-Love, Kain, Smith, Bracek	Nanyn 5/6	N/A	4,133	Scott Grix, Damien Blanch, Toa Kohe-Love, Mick Nanyn, Gavin Dodd, Dennis Moran, Andy Kain, Mick Cassidy, Mark Smith, Andy Bracek, Paul Noone, Oliver Wilkes, Bob Beswick	Ian Webster, Lee Doran, Jordan James, Ben Harrison
25/2/07	2007 Northern Rail Cup - Group 6	London Skolars	H	W	60-10	Kohe-Love (4), Grix (2), Nanyn, Draper, Smith, Kirk, Doran	Nanyn 6/7, Dodd 2/3	N/A	2,700	Gavin Dodd, Andy Kirk, Toa Kohe-Love, Mick Nanyn, Dean Gaskell, Scott Grix, Andy Kain, Jordan James, Mark Smith, Ben Harrison, Lee Doran, Oliver Wilkes, Bob Beswick	Adam Bowman, Rob Draper, Paul Noone, Gareth Price
4/3/07	2007 Northern Rail Cup - Group 6	Leigh Centurions	A	L	24-8	Cardiss, Beswick	Dodd 0/2	N/A	2,291	Gavin Dodd, Daryl Cardiss, Toa Kohe-Love, Andy Kirk, Dean Gaskell, Scott Grix, Andy Kain, Mick Cassidy, Mark Smith, Andy Bracek, Lee Doran, Paul Noone, Bob Beswick	Adam Bowman, Oliver Wilkes, Jordan James, Gareth Price
18/3/07	2007 Northern Rail Cup - Group 6	London Skolars	A	W	0-66	Wilkes (2), Moran (3), Webster (3), Kohe-Love (2), Nanyn, Kirk	Nanyn 7/9, Noone 2/3	N/A	789	Scott Grix, Andy Kirk, Toa Kohe-Love, Mick Nanyn, Dean Gaskell, Dennis Moran, Ian Webster, Jordan James, Mark Smith, Oliver Wilkes, Lee Doran, Paul Noone, Bob Beswick	Daryl Cardiss, Adam Sidlow, Gavin Dodd, Mike Morrison
25/3/07	2007 Northern Rail Cup - Group 6	Celtic Crusaders	H	W	32-10	Bowman, Dodd, Grix (3), Cardiss	Dodd 4/6	N/A	2,540	Scott Grix, Damien Blanch, Daryl Cardiss, Andy Kirk, Gavin Dodd, Andy Kain, Ian Webster, Jordan James, Bob Beswick, Oliver Wilkes, Rob Draper, Lee Doran, Paul Noone	Adam Bowman, Adam Sidlow, Dean Gaskell, Mike Morrison
22/4/07	2007 Northern Rail Cup - Quarter Final Qualifying Cup	Batley Bulldogs	H	W	62-6	Kain (2), Cassidy, Gaskell (2), Moran, Smith, Beswick, Wilkes, Noone, Kirk	Dodd 9/11	N/A	2,140	Scott Grix, Dean Gaskell, Toa Kohe-Love, Andy Kirk, Gavin Dodd, Dennis Moran, Andy Kain, Jordan James, Mark Smith, Oliver Wilkes, Lee Doran, Paul Noone, Bob Beswick	Aaron Summers, Mick Cassidy, Damien Blanch, Gareth Price
27/5/07	2007 Northern Rail Cup - Quarter Final	Rochdale Hornets	A (at Halton Stadium)	W	0-24	Blanch (2), Kirk, Webster	Nanyn 4/4	N/A	2,362	Scott Grix, Damien Blanch, Andy Kirk, Mick Nanyn, Gavin Dodd, Dennis Moran, Ian Webster, Mick Cassidy, Mark Smith, Oliver Wilkes, Lee Doran, Paul Noone, Bob Beswick	Aaron Summers, Jordan James, Dean Gaskell, Danny Lima
24/6/07	2007 Northern Rail Cup - Semi-Final	Castleford Tigers	H	W	18-12	Wilkes, Nanyn	Nanyn 5/5	N/A	5,388	Scott Grix, Damien Blanch, Toa Kohe-Love, Mick Nanyn, Gavin Dodd, Dennis Moran, Joel Penny, Mick Cassidy, Mark Smith, Oliver Wilkes, Aaron Summers, Paul Noone, Bob Beswick	Ian Webster, Lee Doran, Jordan James, Danny Lima
15/7/07	2007 Northern Rail Cup Final	Whitehaven R.L.F.C.	Neutral (at Bloomfield Road)	W	6-54	Kohe-Love, Grix, Blanch (2), Nanyn, Doran, Smith, Moran, Gaskell	Nanyn 9/12	N/A	8,236	Scott Grix, Damien Blanch, Toa Kohe-Love, Mick Nanyn, Dean Gaskell, Dennis Moran, Joel Penny, Mick Cassidy, Mark Smith, Oliver Wilkes, Lee Doran, Paul Noone, Bob Beswick	Aaron Summers, Jordan James, Ian Webster, Gareth Price

== Challenge Cup Results ==
Date	Competition	Vrs	H/A	Result	Score	Tries	Goals	Field goals	Att	Lineup	Subs
11/3/07	Challenge Cup 2007 - Round 3	Normanton Knights	A (at Halton Stadium)	W	10-78	Gaskell (2), Wilkes, Noone, Webster (2), Smith (2), Kirk (2), Moran (4)	Nanyn 11/14	N/A	1,606	Scott Grix, Damien Blanch, Andy Kirk, Mick Nanyn, Dean Gaskell, Dennis Moran, Ian Webster, Jordan James, Mark Smith, Gareth Price, Paul Noone, Oliver Wilkes, Bob Beswick	Daryl Cardiss, Rob Draper, Mick Cassidy, Lee Doran
1/4/07	Challenge Cup 2007 - Round 4	Wigan Warriors	H	L	24-34	Kohe-Love, Grix, James, Noone	Nanyn 4/6	N/A	6,006	Scott Grix, Damien Blanch, Toa Kohe-Love, Mick Nanyn, Gavin Dodd, Dennis Moran, Andy Kain, Jordan James, Mark Smith, Oliver Wilkes, Lee Doran, Paul Noone, Bob Beswick	Aaron Summers, Adam Sidlow, Daryl Cardiss, Mike Morrison
