= 2009 Widnes Vikings season =

- 2009 Northern Rail Cup champions
- Co-operative Championship Rank: 4th
- Play-off result: Lost qualifying semi-final (Featherstone Rovers, 24–32)
- Challenge Cup: Lost fourth round (Halifax, 20–16)
- Northern Rail Cup: Won Final (Barrow Raiders, 18–34)
- 2009 record: Wins: 17; draws: 0; losses: 12
- Points scored: For: 649; against: 438

Team information
- Chairman: Steve O'Connor
- Head coach: Paul Cullen
- Captain: Mark Smith
- Stadium: Stobart Stadium Halton
- Avg. attendance: 3,412 (Excluding Challenge Cup)

Top scorers
- Tries: Paddy Flynn (20)
- Goals: Tim Hartley (56)
| ← 2008 | List of seasons | 2010 → |

The Widnes Vikings competed in the Co-operative Championship in 2009. This was their first season under their new head coachPaul Cullen who replaced the outgoing Steve McCormack. Under Cullen's stewardship, Widnes managed to advance to the final of the Northern Rail Cup and ultimately won the cup, ensuring the club could apply for Super League membership in 2012.

== Table ==
2009 Co-operative Championship
| Pos | Team | Pld | W | D | L | PF | PA | PD | BP | Pts | Qualification |
|---|---|---|---|---|---|---|---|---|---|---|---|
| 1 | Barrow Raiders | 20 | 13 | 0 | 7 | 632 | 361 | +271 | 5 | 44 | Qualified for the play-offs |
| 2 | Halifax | 20 | 13 | 0 | 7 | 714 | 476 | +238 | 4 | 43 | Qualified for the play-offs |
| 3 | Sheffield Eagles | 20 | 11 | 0 | 9 | 635 | 447 | +188 | 9 | 42 | Qualified for the play-offs |
| 4 | Widnes Vikings | 20 | 11 | 0 | 9 | 649 | 438 | +211 | 6 | 39 | Qualified for the play-offs |
| 5 | Whitehaven | 20 | 12 | 0 | 8 | 565 | 567 | −2 | 3 | 39 | Qualified for the play-offs |
| 6 | Featherstone Rovers | 20 | 12 | 0 | 8 | 619 | 524 | +95 | 1 | 37 | Qualified for the play-offs |
| 7 | Gateshead Thunder | 20 | 9 | 2 | 9 | 610 | 657 | −47 | 3 | 32 | |
| 8 | Batley Bulldogs | 20 | 8 | 2 | 10 | 536 | 620 | −84 | 6 | 32 | |
| 9 | Leigh Centurions | 20 | 9 | 0 | 11 | 426 | 572 | −146 | 5 | 32 | Relegated |
| 10 | Toulouse Olympique XIII | 20 | 9 | 0 | 11 | 556 | 582 | −26 | 3 | 30 (Note: Toulouse were exempt from relegation.) | |
| 11 | Doncaster | 20 | 1 | 0 | 19 | 257 | 955 | −698 | −4 | −1 (Note: Doncaster had 5 bonus points, but lost 9 competition points for entering administration.) | Relegated |

Source: www.cooperativechampionship.co.uk and Rugby-League.com
Rules for classification: 1st on league points; 2nd on match points difference.

== 2009 Fixtures and results ==
| Competition | Round | Opponent | Result | Score | Home/Away | Venue | Attendance | Date | Tries | Goals | Field Goals | Lineup | Subs |
|---|---|---|---|---|---|---|---|---|---|---|---|---|---|
| Northern Rail Cup | Pool One | Oldham R.L.F.C. | Loss | 20–22 | Home | Stobart Stadium Halton | 2,783 | 13 February 2009 | Gavin Dodd, Paddy Flynn, John Duffy, Anthony Thackeray | Gavin Dodd 2/3, Richard Fletcher 0/1 | N/A | Loz Wildbore, Paddy Flynn, Richard Varkulis, Toa Kohe-Love, Gavin Dodd, Anthony Thackeray, James Webster, Michael Ostick, Mark Smith, Jim Gannon, Lee Doran, Richard Fletcher, John Duffy | Iain Morrison, Ben Kavanagh, Shane Grady, Josh Simm |
| Northern Rail Cup | Pool One | Gateshead Thunder | Win | 40–18 | Home | Stobart Stadium Halton | 3,001 | 21 February 2009 | Jim Gannon (3), Scott Yates, Toa Kohe-Love, Matt Strong, Richard Fletcher | Scott Yates 6/7 | N/A | Scott Yates, Paddy Flynn, Toa Kohe-Love, Loz Wildbore, Gavin Dodd, John Duffy, James Webster, Michael Ostick, Mark Smith, Jim Gannon, Lee Doran, Richard Varkulis, Richard Fletcher | Anthony Thackeray, Ben Kavanagh, Matt Strong, Shane Grady |
| Northern Rail Cup | Pool One | Blackpool Panthers | Win | 16–46 | Away | Woodlands Memorial Ground | 864 | 1 March 2009 | Toa Kohe-Love (2), Lee Doran, Tim Hartley, Richard Fletcher, Paddy Flynn, John Duffy, Scott Yates | Scott Yates 7/8 | N/A | Scott Yates, Paddy Flynn, Toa Kohe-Love, Matt Strong, Gavin Dodd, Anthony Thackeray, James Webster, Michael Ostick, Mark Smith, Jim Gannon, Ben Kavanagh, Richard Fletcher, Lee Doran | John Duffy, Josh Simm, Tim Hartley, Dave Houghton |
| Northern Rail Cup | Pool One | Barrow Raiders | Loss | 12–4 | Away | Craven Park | 1,563 | 4 March 2009 | Dean Gaskell | Scott Yates 0/1 | N/A | Scott Yates, Paddy Flynn, Toa Kohe-Love, Tim Hartley, Dean Gaskell, Anthony Thackeray, John Duffy, Michael Ostick, Mark Smith, Jim Gannon, Richard Varkulis, Richard Fletcher, Josh Simm | James Webster, Ben Kavanagh, Gavin Dodd, Sam Thompson |
| Challenge Cup | 2 | Saddleworth Rangers | Win | 88–0 | Home | Stobart Stadium Halton | 1,786 | 7 March 2009 | Dean Gaskell, Gavin Dodd (2), Jim Gannon, Michael Ostick, Matt Strong, Richard Varkulis (2), Mark Smith (3), Loz Wildbore (2), Tim Hartley, Sam Thompson | Tim Hartley 14/15 | N/A | Loz Wildbore, Dean Gaskell, Tim Hartley, Shane Grady, Gavin Dodd, Anthony Thackeray, James Webster, Michael Ostick, Mark Smith, Jim Gannon, Josh Simms, Richard Varkulis, Lee Doran | Ben Kavanagh, Matt Strong, Sam Thompson, Anthony Mullally |
| Co-operative Championship | 1 | Toulouse Olympique | Win | 70-0 | Home | Stobart Stadium Halton | 5,071 | 12 March 2009 | Duffy, Flynn (3), Yates, Fletcher (2), Wildbore (2), Webster, Grady, Doran | Yates 11/12 | N/A | Scott Yates, Paddy Flynn, Shane Grady, Toa Kohe-Love, Dean Gaskell, John Duffy, James Webster, Michael Ostick, Mark Smith, Jim Gannon, Richard Varkulis, Richard Fletcher, Lee Doran | Loz Wildbore, Anthony Thackeray, Ben Kavanagh, Josh Simm |
| Co-operative Championship | 2 | Halifax | Loss | 24-14 | Away | Shay Stadium | 3,274 | 19 March 2009 | Flynn, Gaskell. Grady | Yates 0/1, Dodd 1/2 | N/A | Scott Yates, Dean Gaskell, Shane Grady, Toa Kohe-Love, Paddy Flynn, John Duffy, James Webster, Michael Ostick, Mark Smith, Jim Gannon, Richard Varkulis, Lee Doran, Loz Wildbore | Anthony Thackeray, Gavin Dodd, Ben Kavanagh, Josh Simm |
| Co-operative Championship | 3 | Sheffield Eagles | Win | 28-20 | Home | Stobart Stadium Halton | 3,181 | 28 March 2009 | Scott Yates, Paddy Flynn (2), Lee Doran, Mark Smith (2) | Gavin Dodd 2/6 | N/A | Scott Yates, Paddy Flynn, Richard Varkulis, Shane Grady, Dean Gaskell, Anthony Thackeray, James Webster, Michael Ostick, Mark Smith, Jim Gannon, Lee Doran, Josh Simm, John Duffy | Loz Wildbore, Gavin Dodd, Ben Kavanagh, Sam Thompson |
| Challenge Cup | 3 | Halifax | Loss | 20–16 | Away | Shay Stadium | 3,204 | 3 April 2009 | Jim Gannon, Anthony Thackeray | Richard Fletcher 1/1, Gavin Dodd 3/3 | N/A | Loz Wildbore, Paddy Flynn, Shane Grady, Richard Varkulis, Dean Gaskell, Anthony Thackeray, James Webster, Michael Ostick, Mark Smith, Jim Gannon, Richard Fletcher, Lee Doran, John Duffy | Sam Thompson, Gavin Dodd, Ben Kavanagh, Josh Simm |
| Co-operative Championship | 4 | Leigh Centurions | Loss | 8-10 | Home | Stobart Stadium Halton | 4,354 | 10 April 2009 | Loz Wildbore | Gavin Dodd 2/2 | N/A | Loz Wildbore, Dean Gaskell, Richard Varkulis, Gavin Dodd, Paddy Flynn, Anthony Thackeray, James Webster, Michael Ostick, Mark Smith, Jim Gannon, Lee Doran, Josh Simm, John Duffy | Ben Kavanagh, Sam Thompson, Scott Yates, Shane Grady (Not Used) |
| Co-operative Championship | 5 | Doncaster | Win | 18-24 | Away | Chris Moyles Stadium | 831 | 13 April 2009 | Scott Yates, Gavin Dodd, Sam Thompson, Anthony Thackeray, Lee Doran | Gavin Dodd 0/2, Scott Yates 2/4 | N/A | Scott Yates, Paddy Flynn, Richard Varkulis, Gavin Dodd, Dean Gaskell, Anthony Thackeray, James Webster, Michael Ostick, Mark Smith, Jim Gannon, Josh Simm, Lee Doran, Loz Wildbore | Danny Mills, Ben Kavanagh, Sam Thompson, Shane Grady |
| Co-operative Championship | 6 | Batley Bulldogs | Win | 40-18 | Home | Stobart Stadium Halton | 2,901 | 17 April 2009 | Richard Varkulis, Dean Gaskell, Scott Yates, Anthony Thackeray, Ben Kavanagh, Michael Ostick, Gavin Dodd | Scott Yates 6/7 | N/A | Scott Yates, Paddy Flynn, Richard Varkulis, Gavin Dodd, Dean Gaskell, Anthony Thackeray, James Webster, Michael Ostick, Mark Smith, Jim Gannon, Josh Simms, Lee Doran, Loz Wildbore | Danny Mills, Ben Kavanagh, Shane Grady, Sam Thompson |
| Co-operative Championship | 7 | Sheffield Eagles | Win | 20-22 | Away | Don Valley | 1,231 | 26 April 2009 | Richard Varkulis, John Duffy, James Webster, Richard Fletcher | Scott Yates 3/4 | N/A | Scott Yates, Dean Gaskell, Toa Kohe-Love, Gavin Dodd, Paddy Flynn, Anthony Thackeray, James Webster, Michael Ostick, Mark Smith, Jim Gannon, Josh Simms, Richard Fletcher, John Duffy | Loz Wildbore, Richard Varkulis, Ben Kavanagh, Sam Thompson |
| Co-operative Championship | 8 | Barrow Raiders | Loss | 6-27 | Home | Stobart Stadium Halton | 3,290 | 1 May 2009 | Steve Bannister | Steve Tyrer 1/1 | N/A | Loz Wildbore, Dean Gaskell, Toa Kohe-Love, Steve Tyrer, Paddy Flynn, Anthony Thackeray, James Webster, Michael Ostick, Mark Smith, Jim Gannon, Lee Doran, Richard Varkulis, John Duffy | Steve Bannister, Gavin Dodd, Sam Thompson, Ben Kavanagh |
| Co-operative Championship | 9 | Whitehaven | Loss | 26-22 | Away | Recreation Ground | 2,102 | 7 May 2009 | Steve Bannister, James Webster (3) | Steve Tyrer 3/5 | N/A | Loz Wildbore, Paddy Flynn, Richard Varkulis, Steve Tyrer, Gavin Dodd, John Duffy, James Webster, Michael Ostick, Mark Smith, Jim Gannon, Josh Simm, Steve Bannister, Lee Paterson | Anthony Thackeray, Lee Doran, Ben Kavanagh, Sam Thompson |
| Co-operative Championship | 10 | Leigh Centurions | Loss | 23-16 | Away | LSV | 2,556 | 14 May 2009 | Gavin Dodd, James Webster, Michael Ostick | Steve Tyrer 1/2, Steve Bannister 1/2 | N/A | Loz Wildbore, Paddy Flynn, Richard Varkulis, Steve Tyrer, Gavin Dodd, John Duffy, James Webster, Michael Ostick, Mark Smith, Jim Gannon, Josh Simm, Steve Bannister, Lee Paterson | Anthony Thackeray, Lee Doran, Ben Kavanagh, Sam Thompson |
| Co-operative Championship | 11 | Gateshead Thunder | Win | 46–30 | Home | Stobart Stadium Halton | 5,236 | 23 May 2009 | Lee Doran (2), Jim Gannon, Anthony Thackeray, Gavin Dodd, Paddy Flynn, Kevin Penny, Steve Bannister | Tim Hartley 5/5, Gavin Dodd 2/3 | N/A | Gavin Dodd, Paddy Flynn, Richard Varkulis, Tim Hartley, Kevin Penny, John Duffy, James Webster, Ben Kavanagh, Mark Smith, Jim Gannon, Lee Doran, Steve Bannister, Lee Paterson | Anthony Thackeray, Iain Morrison, Josh Simms, Steve Pickersgill |
| Co-operative Championship | 12 | Batley Bulldogs | Loss | 40–34 | Away | Mount Pleasant | 1,089 | 30 May 2009 | Iain Morrison (3), Paddy Flynn, Anthony Thackeray, Richard Varkulis | Tim Hartley 5/6 | N/A | Gavin Dodd, Paddy Flynn, Richard Varkulis, Tim Hartley, Kevin Penny, Anthony Thackeray, James Webster, Jim Gannon, Mark Smith, Michael Ostick, Richard Fletcher, Iain Morrison, Lee Doran | John Duffy, Josh Simm, Ben Kavanagh, Steve Pickersgill |
| Northern Rail Cup | QF | York City Knights | Win | 44–18 | Home | Stobart Stadium Halton | 1,650 | 6 June 2009 | Dean Gaskell, Anthony Thackeray, Ben Kavanagh, Richard Varkulis, Toa Kohe-Love (3), Richard Fletcher | Craig Hall 6/8 | N/A | Gavin Dodd, Dean Gaskell, Toa Kohe-Love, Craig Hall, Kevin Penny, Anthony Thackeray, James Webster, Steve Pickersgill, Mark Smith, Jim Gannon, Iain Morrison, Richard Fletcher, Lee Doran | Richard Varkulis, Tim Hartley, Ben Kavanagh, Michael Ostick |
| Co-operative Championship | 13 | Featherstone Rovers | Win | 46–22 | Home | Stobart Stadium Halton | 3,278 | 13 June 2009 | Kevin Penny, Jon Grayshon, Iain Morrison, James Webster, Gavin Dodd, Mark Smith, Toa Kohe-Love, Dean Gaskell | Craig Hall 7/8 | N/A | Gavin Dodd, Dean Gaskell, Toa Kohe-Love, Craig Hall, Kevin Penny, Anthony Thackeray, James Webster, Jim Gannon, Mark Smith, Steve Pickersgill, Richard Fletcher, Jon Grayshon, Iain Morrison | Richard Varkulis, Lee Doran, Tim Hartley, Ben Kavanagh |
| Northern Rail Cup | SF | Halifax | Win | 22–27 | Away | Shay Stadium | 3,972 | 20 June 2009 | Anthony Thackeray (3), Gavin Dodd | Craig Hall 5/6 | Craig Hall | Gavin Dodd, Dean Gaskell, Toa Kohe-Love, Craig Hall, Kevin Penny, Anthony Thackeray, James Webster, Jim Gannon, Mark Smith, Steve Pickersgill, Richard Fletcher, Richard Varkulis, Iain Morrison | John Duffy, Lee Doran, Ben Kavanagh, Tim Hartley |
| Co-operative Championship | 15 | Doncaster | Win | 78–4 | Home | Stobart Stadium Halton | 3,453 | 4 July 2009 | Kevin Penny (3), Toa Kohe-Love, Paddy Flynn (2), Craig Hall, Jon Grayshon, Richard Varkulis (2), Gavin Dodd, Richard Fletcher, Mark Smith, Steve Pickersgill | Craig Hall 8/11, Gavin Dodd 3/3 | N/A | Gavin Dodd, Paddy Flynn, Toa Kohe-Love, Craig Hall, Kevin Penny, Anthony Thackeray, John Duffy, Lee Doran, Mark Smith, Steve Pickersgill, Richard Fletcher, Jon Grayshon, Lee Paterson | Richard Varkulis, Tim Hartley, Ben Kavanagh, Michael Ostick |
| Northern Rail Cup | F | Barrow Raiders | Win | 18–34 | Neutral | Blackpool | 8,720 | 12 July 2009 | Richard Fletcher, John Duffy, Kevin Penny (2), Toa Kohe-Love, Richard Varkulis | Craig Hall 5/6 | N/A | Gavin Dodd, Dean Gaskell, Toa Kohe-Love, Craig Hall, Kevin Penny, Anthony Thackeray, James Webster, Steve Pickersgill, Mark Smith, Jim Gannon, Richard Varkulis, Richard Fletcher, Iain Morrison | John Duffy, Lee Doran, Tim Hartley, Ben Kavanagh |
| Co-operative Championship | 16 | Gateshead Thunder | Loss | 34–18 | Away | Gateshead International Stadium | 717 | 19 July 2009 | Kevin Penny, Paddy Flynn, Anthony Thackeray | Tim Hartley 3/3 | N/A | Gavin Dodd, Paddy Flynn, Tim Hartley, Richard Varkulis, Kevin Penny, Anthony Thackeray, James Webster, Steve Pickersgill, Mark Smith, Jim Gannon, Jon Grayshon, Richard Fletcher, Lee Doran | John Duffy, Lee Paterson, Ben Kavanagh, Michael Ostick |
| Co-operative Championship | 17 | Toulouse Olympique | Win | 24–32 | Away | Stade des Minimes | 3,206 | 25 July 2009 | Jon Grayshon, Ben Kavanagh, Kevin Penny (2), Jim Gannon. Richard Varkulis | Gavin Dodd 4/6 | N/A | Gavin Dodd, Dean Gaskell, Richard Varkulis, Toa Kohe-Love, Kevin Penny, Anthony Thackeray, James Webster, Steve Pickersgill, Mark Smith, Jim Gannon, Jon Grayshon, Richard Fletcher, Iain Morrison | Lee Doran, Tim Hartley, Ben Kavanagh, Michael Ostick |
| Co-operative Championship | 18 | Halifax | Win | 42–16 | Home | Stobart Stadium Halton | 4,039 | 31 July 2009 | Iain Morrison, Paddy Flynn (3), Richard Varkulis, Toa Kohe-Love, Kevin Penny | Tim Hartley 7/9 | N/A | Gavin Dodd, Paddy Flynn, Toa Kohe-Love, Richard Varkulis, Kevin Penny, Tim Hartley, James Webster, Iain Morrison, John Duffy, Jim Gannon, Richard Fletcher, Jon Grayshon, Lee Doran | Anthony Thackeray, Ben Kavanagh, Michael Ostick, Steve Pickersgill |
| Co-operative Championship | 19 | Featherstone Rovers | Loss | 34-29 | Away | Chris Moyles Stadium | 730 | 9 August 2009 | Toa Kohe-Love, Paddy Flynn (2), Anthony Thackeray (2) | Tim Hartley 4/6 | Mark Smith | Gavin Dodd, Paddy Flynn, Richard Varkulis, Toa Kohe-Love, Kevin Penny, Tim Hartley, James Webster, Steve Pickersgill, Mark Smith, Jim Gannon, Lee Doran, Jon Grayshon, John Duffy | Dean Gaskell, Anthony Thackeray, Ben Kavanagh, Michael Ostick |
| Co-operative Championship | 20 | Barrow Raiders | Loss | 38-16 | Away | Craven Park | 3,050 | 15 August 2009 | Gavin Dodd, Paddy Flynn, Tim Hartley | Tim Hartley 2/3 | N/A | Gavin Dodd, Paddy Flynn, Richard Varkulis, Tim Hartley, Dean Gaskell, Anthony Thackeray, James Webster, Jim Gannon, Mark Smith, Michael Ostick, Lee Doran, Jon Grayshon, Lee Paterson | Scott Yates, Ben Kavanagh, Shane Grady, Dave Houghton |
| Co-operative Championship | 21 | Whitehaven | Win | 58-10 | Home | Stobart Stadium Halton | 3,275 | 22 August 2009 | Anthony Thackeray, Richard Varkulis (2), Jim Gannon, Richard Fletcher (2), John Duffy, Paddy Flynn, Dean Gaskell, Lee Doran | Tim Hartley 9/11 | N/A | Gavin Dodd, Paddy Flynn, Tim Hartley, Richard Varkulis, Dean Gaskell, Anthony Thackeray, James Webster, Michael Ostick, Mark Smith, Jim Gannon, Richard Fletcher, Lee Doran, Iain Morrison | John Duffy, Ben Kavanagh, Shane Grady, Dave Houghton |
| Co-operative Championship | Elimination play-offs | Whitehaven | Win | 26-21 | Home | Stobart Stadium Halton | 2,375 | 10 September 2009 | Shane Grady, Tim Hartley (2), Anthony Thackeray, James Webster | Tim Hartley 3/5 | N/A | Gavin Dodd, Paddy Flynn, Tim Hartley, Shane Grady, Richard Varkulis, Anthony Thackeray, James Webster, Michael Ostick, Mark Smith, Jim Gannon, Richard Fletcher, Jon Grayshon, Lee Doran | Ben Kavanagh, Scott Yates, Dave Houghton, Danny Hulme (Not Used) |
| Co-operative Championship | Elimination play-offs | Featherstone Rovers | Loss | 24-32 | Home | Stobart Stadium Halton | 3,296 | 18 September 2009 | Gavin Dodd, Lee Doran, Shane Grady, Richard Varkulis | Tim Hartley 4/4 | N/A | Gavin Dodd, Paddy Flynn, Richard Varkulis, Tim Hartley, Dean Gaskell, Anthony Thackeray, James Webster, Iain Morrison, Mark Smith, Jim Gannon, Richard Fletcher, Jon Grayshon, Lee Doran | John Duffy, Ben Kavanagh, Michael Ostick, Shane Grady |

== Signings and transfers ==
=== 2009 Signings ===
| Name | Moved from | Contract length |
|---|---|---|
| Danny Mills | Sheffield Eagles | Unknown |
| Anthony Thackeray | Castleford Tigers | Unknown |
| Toa Kohe-Love | Leigh Centurions | Unknown |
| Richard Varkulis | Halifax | 1 Year |
| Lee Doran | Leigh Centurions | Unknown |
| Ben Kavanagh | Wigan Warriors | 3 Years |
| James Webster | Hull | 2 Years |
| Sam Thompson | St. Helens | 2 Years |
| Loz Wildbore | Featherstone Rovers | 2 Years |
| Steve Bannister | Salford City Reds | Unknown |
| Brett Robinson | Wigan Warriors | Unknown |

=== 2009 Transfers ===
| Name | Moved to | Date departed |
|---|---|---|
| Bob Beswick | Halifax | September 2008 |
| Sam Barlow | Released | September 2008 |
| Adam Bowman | Released | September 2008 |
| Dayne Donoghue | Released | September 2008 |
| Rob Draper | Blackpool Panthers | September 2008 |
| Adel Fellous | Toulouse Olympique | September 2008 |
| Tommy Gallagher | Released | September 2008 |
| Ian Hardman | Featherstone Rovers | September 2008 |
| Martin McLoughlin | Released | September 2008 |
| Gareth Morton | Released | September 2008 |
| Paul Noone | Barrow Raiders | September 2008 |
| Steve Roper | Workington Town | September 2008 |

== Squad ==
| Squad Number | Player | D.O.B. | Appearances | Tries | Goals | F Goals | Points |
|---|---|---|---|---|---|---|---|
| 1. | Loz Wildbore | 23/9/84 | 14 | 5 | 0 | 0 | 20 |
| 2. | Dean Gaskell | 12/4/83 | 20 | 7 | 0 | 0 | 28 |
| 3. | Richard Varkulis | 21/5/82 | 30 | 14 | 0 | 0 | 56 |
| 4. | Toa Kohe-Love | 2/12/76 | 15 | 11 | 0 | 0 | 44 |
| 5. | Danny Mills | 10/8/82 | 2 | 0 | 0 | 0 | 0 |
| 6. | Anthony Thackeray | 19/2/86 | 31 | 15 | 0 | 0 | 60 |
| 7. | James Webster | 11/7/79 | 30 | 8 | 0 | 0 | 32 |
| 8. | Iain Morrison | 6/5/83 | 11 | 5 | 0 | 0 | 20 |
| 9. | Mark Smith | 18/8/81 | 30 | 7 | 0 | 1 | 29 |
| 10. | Jim Gannon | 16/6/77 | 30 | 8 | 0 | 0 | 32 |
| 11. | Lee Doran | 23/3/81 | 29 | 8 | 0 | 0 | 32 |
| 12. | Richard Fletcher | 17/5/81 | 19 | 10 | 1 | 0 | 42 |
| 13. | Lee Paterson | 5/7/81 | 6 | 0 | 0 | 0 | 0 |
| 14. | John Duffy | 2/7/80 | 23 | 6 | 56 | 0 | 24 |
| 15. | Tim Hartley | 2/1/86 | 18 | 5 | 56 | 0 | 132 |
| 16. | Gavin Dodd | 28/2/81 | 30 | 12 | 19 | 0 | 86 |
| 17. | Ben Kavanagh | 4/3/88 | 31 | 3 | 0 | 0 | 12 |
| 18. | Matt Strong | 17/2/87 | 3 | 2 | 0 | 0 | 8 |
| 19. | Michael Ostick | 23/1/88 | 27 | 3 | 0 | 0 | 12 |
| 20. | Sam Thompson | 9/10/86 | 11 | 2 | 0 | 0 | 8 |
| 21. | Scott Yates | 8/9/88 | 12 | 6 | 35 | 0 | 94 |
| 22. | Paddy Flynn | 11/12/87 | 25 | 20 | 0 | 0 | 80 |
| 23. | Shane Grady | 13/12/89 | 13 | 4 | 0 | 0 | 16 |
| 24. | Josh Simm | 8/11/89 | 16 | 0 | 0 | 0 | 0 |
| 25. | Anthony Mullally | 28/6/91 | 1 | 0 | 0 | 0 | 0 |
| 26. | Steve Bannister | 10/10/87 | 4 | 3 | 1 | 0 | 14 |
| 28. | Steve Pickersgill | 28/11/85 | 11 | 1 | 0 | 0 | 4 |
| 29. | Kevin Penny | 3/10/87 | 11 | 11 | 0 | 0 | 44 |
| 31. | David Houghton | 2/11/89 | 4 | 0 | 0 | 0 | 0 |
| 32. | Steve Tyrer | 16/3/89 | 3 | 0 | 5 | 0 | 10 |
| 32. | Craig Hall | 21/2/88 | 5 | 1 | 31 | 1 | 67 |
| 33. | Danny Hulme | 15/2/91 | 0 | 0 | 0 | 0 | 0 |
| 35. | Jon Grayshon | 10/5/83 | 9 | 3 | 0 | 0 | 12 |
