= Richard Agar =

English RL coach & footballer (born 1972)

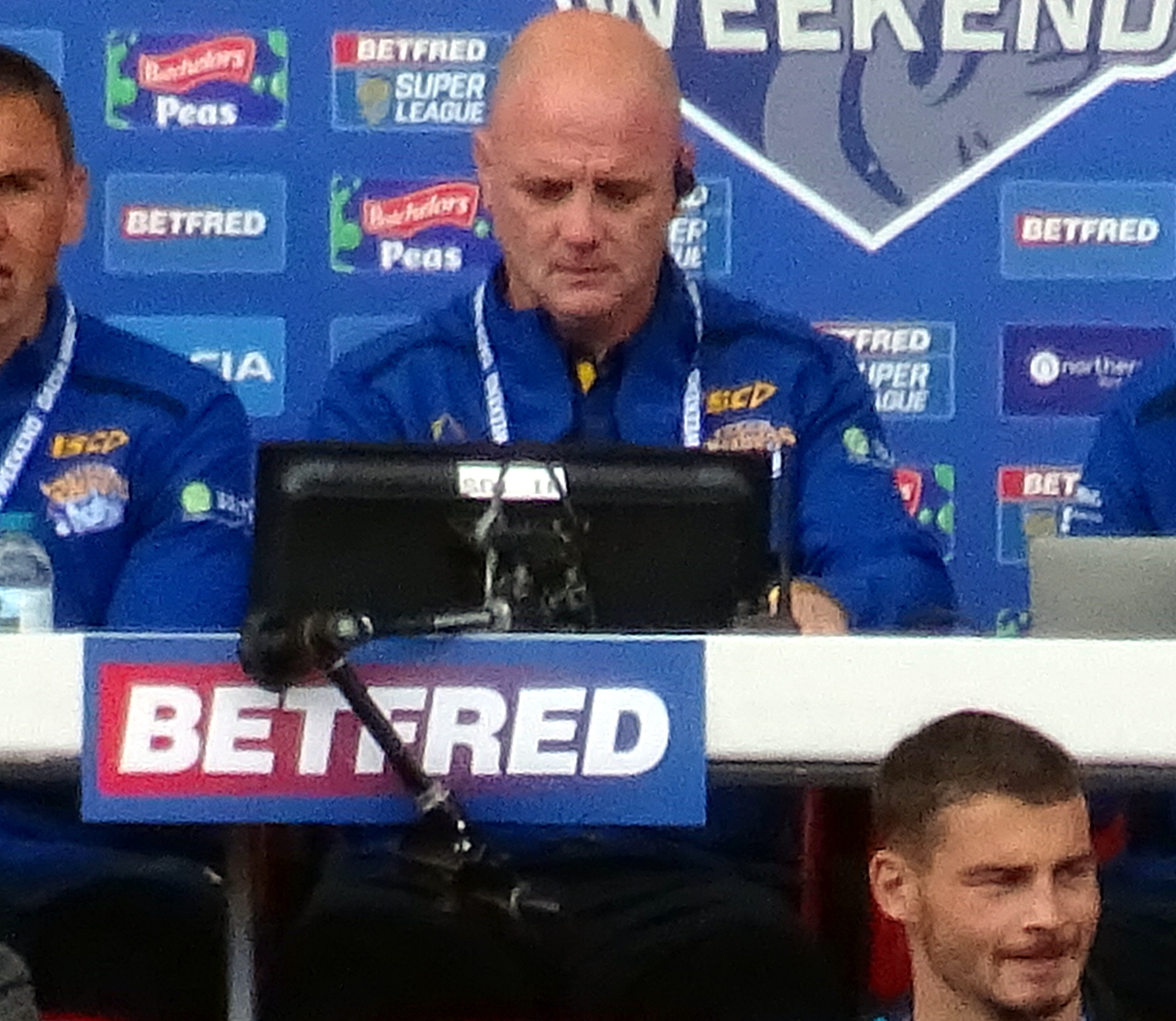

Personal information
- Full name: Richard Paul Agar
- Born: 20 January 1972 (age 54) Pontefract, England

Playing information
Club
Years	Team	Pld	T	G	FG	P
1994–96	Dewsbury	33	4	104	0	224
1996–98	Rochdale Hornets	27	2	13	1	35
1998–01	Dewsbury Rams	84	7	12	13	65
2001	Widnes Vikings	16	2	13	3	37
2002	Rochdale Hornets	14	4	16	0	48
2003	Featherstone Rovers	23	4	1	2	20
	Total	197	23	159	19	429

Coaching information
Club
Years	Team	Gms	W	D	L	W%
2003–04	York City Knights
2008–11	Hull F.C.	104	47	1	56	45
2012–14	Wakefield Trinity Wildcats	77	30	2	46	39
2019–22	Leeds Rhinos	71	36	0	35	51
	Total	252	113	3	137	45
Representative
Years	Team	Gms	W	D	L	W%
2013–15	France	11	5	0	6	45
- Source: As of 10 June 2021
- Father: Allan Agar

Richard Agar (born 20 January 1972) is an English professional rugby league coach who is the former head coach of the Leeds Rhinos in the Super League and a former professional rugby league footballer who played in the 1990s and 2000s.

He played at club level for the Dewsbury (Rams) (two spells), Featherstone Rovers (two spells), the Widnes Vikings and the Rochdale Hornets, and has coached at representative level for France, and at club level for the York City Knights, Hull F.C. (two spells, initially as assistant coach), the Wakefield Trinity Wildcats, and Warrington Wolves (First Team Coach c. 2014…2015).

== Background ==
Richard Agar's birth was registered in Pontefract district, West Riding of Yorkshire, England. He is the son of the rugby league footballer and coach; Allan Agar.

== Playing career ==
Agar played for Featherstone Rovers, Dewsbury Rams and Widnes Vikings, where he played 16 games in 2001 and won a Northern Ford Premiership Grand Final winners medal, but he turned down the opportunity to play for Widnes Vikings in 2002's Super League VII.

Agar made his début for Featherstone Rovers on Sunday 16 June 2002, and he played his last match for Featherstone Rovers during the 2003 season.

== Coaching career ==
He spent four years as assistant coach at Hull F.C. under John Kear and Peter Sharp. In 2008 Hull F.C. appointed Richard Agar as their head coach following the departure of Sharp.

In September 2011 it was announced that Agar had signed a three-year deal with Wakefield Trinity Wildcats, and would become their head coach following the end of the 2011 season.

In February 2013, it was announced that Agar would coach France for the 2013 Rugby League World Cup. Agar coached France to the World Cup Quarter-Final

On 2 June 2014, Agar quit his job with Wakefield Trinity Wildcats with immediate effect and was replaced by his assistant James Webster.

On 10 June 2014, it was confirmed Agar would become first team coach of Warrington Wolves for the 2015 Super League season working alongside Tony Smith.

On 29 August 2016, Agar resigned as head coach of the French national team. It is believed he left because new Fédération Française de Rugby à XIII president Marc Palanques wanted a Frenchman to coach the national team.

On 17 October 2020, he coached Leeds in the 2020 Challenge Cup Final victory over Salford at Wembley Stadium. In the 2021 Super League season, he guided Leeds to a fifth-placed finish on the table as the club qualified for the playoffs.

On 21 March 2022, Agar announced he would step down as Leeds head coach with immediate effect.

On 3 August 2022, Agar was announced as assistant coach for the New Zealand Warriors on a two-year deal commencing in 2023. He would join head coach Andrew Webster, his fellow Toa Samoa assistant coach and younger brother his former assistant James.
