= Alex Rowe =

Alex or Alexander Row(e) may refer to:

- Alex Rowe (rugby league) (born 1985), English rugby league player
- Alexander Rowe (runner) (born 1992), Australian athlete
- Alex Rowe (soldier) (born 1966), British-born French Foreign Legionnaire and Légion d'honneur holder
- Alex Row (Last Exile), a character from the Japanese animated television series Last Exile
- Alexander Rou, film director known in English as Alexander Rowe
