= Selwyn St. Bernard =

Former West Indian dual-code rugby international footballer

Personal information
- Born: 30 July 1977 (age 48)

Playing information

Rugby union
- Position: Flanker
Club
Years	Team	Pld	T	G	FG	P
1999–04	Basingstoke R.F.C.
2006	Blaydon RFC
	Total	0	0	0	0	0
Representative
Years	Team	Pld	T	G	FG	P
2008	Trinidad and Tobago

Rugby league
- Position: Prop
Club
Years	Team	Pld	T	G	FG	P
2005–06	Gateshead Thunder
Representative
Years	Team	Pld	T	G	FG	P
2004	West Indies	1	0	0	0	0
- As of 28 February 2021

Selwyn St. Bernard (born 30 July 1977) is a Trinidad and Tobago rugby union and rugby league footballer. As a rugby union player, his position is as a flanker. St. Bernard has represented Trinidad and Tobago and the West Indies in rugby union at 15-a-side and sevens, and the West Indies in rugby league at 13-a-side and nines.

== Playing career ==
He first played for Caribs RFC, in Trinidad, then also played in England, where he represented Basingstoke R.F.C., in rugby union, from 1999/2000 to 2004. In December 2001, St. Bernard was named as the Rugby Player of the Year at the Trinidad and Tobago Rugby Football Union annual awards following the success of Caribs in winning the Championship Division and several other competitions throughout the season. In 2004, he switched to rugby league and joined Gateshead Thunder. In 2006, he signed for Blaydon RFC.

=== Representative ===
==== Rugby union ====
In 2000, St. Bernard was in the West Indies rugby squad that toured England. In June 2001, St. Bernard was in the West Indies rugby sevens team that took part in the 2001 Cardiff Sevens. In August 2001, he represented the West Indies at the Cayman 7's and in November he captained the Trinidad and Tobago national rugby sevens team at the Trinidad 7's tournament.

In November 2001, St. Bernard was in the Trinidad and Tobago team that won the 2001 NACRA Rugby Championship (part of the qualification process for 2003 Rugby World Cup). St. Bernard also represented Trinidad and Tobago in 2008 in the qualifiers for the 2011 Rugby World Cup.

==== Rugby league ====
In 2004, St. Bernard represented the West Indies playing rugby league nines at the Middlesex 9s and at the York 9s where he scored the golden point try in the final for the West Indies to win the Fairfax Cup. In October 2004, St Bernard played in the first 13-a-side international for the West Indies which they won 50–22 against South Africa.
