= Dominic Peters =

Barbados rugby union & West Indies rugby league international rugby footballer

Dom Peters
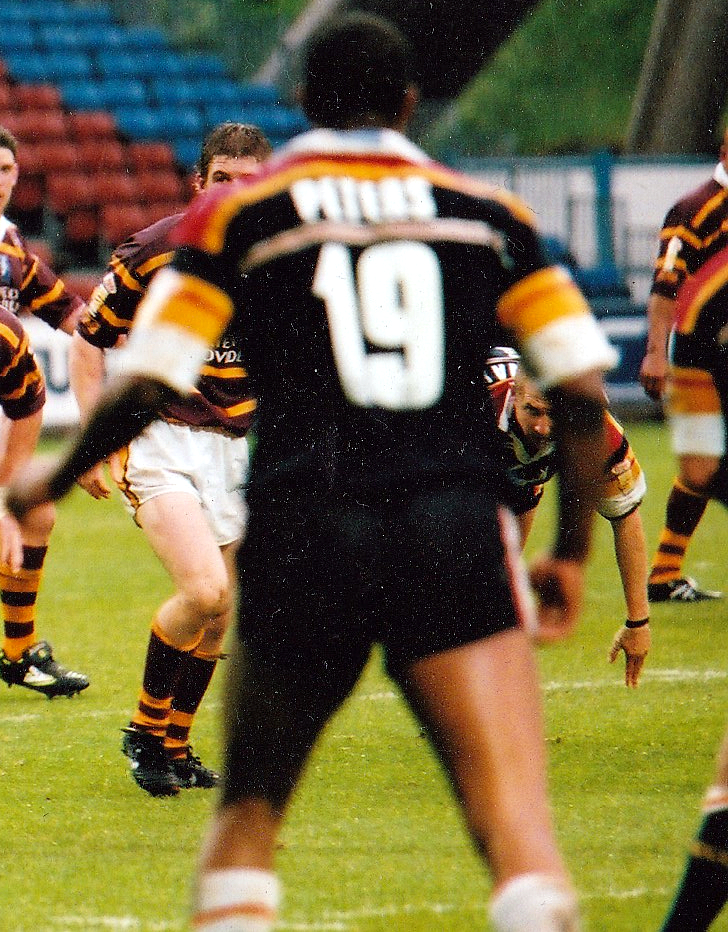

Personal information
- Full name: Dominic Peters
- Born: 11 December 1978 (age 47) Acton, London, England

Playing information
- Height: 6 ft 2 in (1.88 m)
- Weight: 15 st 9 lb (99 kg)

Rugby league
- Position: Centre, Second-row
Club
Years	Team	Pld	T	G	FG	P
1998–03	London Broncos	75	13	0	0	52
2003(loan)	→ London Skolars	2	0	0	0	0
	Total	77	13	0	0	52
Representative
Years	Team	Pld	T	G	FG	P
2001	Lancashire	1	0	0	0	0
2004	West Indies	1	1	0	0	4

Rugby union
Club
Years	Team	Pld	T	G	FG	P
	London Wasps
Representative
Years	Team	Pld	T	G	FG	P
	Barbados

Dominic Peters (born 11 December 1978 in Acton) is an English former professional rugby league footballer.

Peters played for the London Broncos in the Super League. He has also played for the London Skolars and the London Wasps.

Dominic Peters' position of choice was as a wing. He could also operate in the second-row.

== Early career ==
Dom Peters was introduced to Rugby Union at Gunnersbury Catholic School, Brentford, Middlesex. It was here that he was recognised as a strong and powerful winger, scoring many tries over a few seasons with the 1st team, helping them on their way to win the Middlesex County Cup for three years in a row from 1995–97.

Dom Peters was seen as an example for all inner-city children wanting to get into professional sport after coming through the Broncos youth system. He was seen as a highly promising winger when injury-free.

== Drug Controversy ==
London Broncos terminated the contract of Dominic Peters after he was handed a 12-month ban by the RFL for taking the banned drug stanozolol. Peters had the remaining 12 months of his contract torn up after he was banned for steroid abuse.

== Representative Football ==
Peters was a Lancashire Origin player, despite being London born and bred.

Peters played in the first and only fixture of West Indies v South Africa in 2004. He played in the second-row and scored a try.

Dom Peters is a Rugby Union international with Barbados.
