= Patrick Rich =

English rugby league footballer

Pat Rich
Personal information
- Full name: Patrick Rich
- Born: England

Playing information
- Position: Centre, Wing
Club
Years	Team	Pld	T	G	FG	P
	Keighley Cougars
1999–01	Oldham	65	17	254	0	576
2002	Sheffield Eagles
2002	London Skolars
2004	Oldham	14(2)	2	49	0	106
	Total		19	303	0	682

Patrick (or Pat) Rich is an English former professional rugby league footballer who represented Oldham in the Northern Ford Premiership (later National League One in the National Leagues).

== Playing career ==
Started his career as an amateur playing for Durham Tigers RLFC in the North-East of England, outside of the sport's traditional heartland. He played stand off for the club who had some success as a junior side in the early 90s dominating the other junior teams in the North East and also having successful forays against Yorkshire teams. He began his senior professional career as loose forward at Keighley Cougars, Pat subsequently moved to Oldham where his biggest impact came during the 2001 season and, in particular, his contribution with the boot which helped his side to the Northern Ford Premiership semi-final win 39–32 over Rochdale Hornets when he kicked nine out of nine goal attempts. In the Grand Final he was unable to secure the points needed with Neil Kelly's Widnes Vikings running out victors 24–12.

During his first spell at Oldham, Pat was the club's most consistent goal kicker since the 1960s. At various times he held a number of club records including, goals in a season (146, 2000 to 2001) goals in a career (303, 1999 to 2004) and points in a career (682, 1999 to 2004). After a short period at Oldham, Pat left the North Western club to pursue a career in the law. Although he returned for brief spells with Sheffield Eagles, London Skolars, and finally Oldham for some 14 games in 2004, he no longer plays competitive football. Rich's seven-year-long record for points scored for Roughyeds in a single season (320) was eventually beaten by Mick Nanyn (362) in 2008. In 79 appearances (2 as substitute) he scored 682 points (303 goals and 19 tries).
