= West Indies national rugby league team =

Multinational team 2003–2004

West Indies
Team information
- Nickname: The Wahoos
- Governing body: West Indies Rugby League Federation
- Region: Americas
- Head coach: Steve Pryce

Uniforms
First colours

Team results
- First international
- West Indies 50 - 22 South Africa (London, England; 9 October 2004)
- Biggest win
- West Indies 50 - 22 South Africa (London, England; 9 October 2004)
- World Cup
- Appearances: 0

The West Indies rugby league team (nicknamed "The Wahoos") represented the Caribbean and West Indies region in the sport of rugby league football. Governed by the West Indies Rugby League Federation, the team played their only international against South Africa in 2004.

Like the Great Britain national rugby league team, the team split into individual nations following their 2004 international. Subsequently, Jamaica qualified for the 2021 Rugby League World Cup.

== Represented nations and territories ==
At the time that the federation was established, players from the following nations and countries were eligible to represent the West Indies:

- Antigua & Barbuda
- Aruba
- Bahamas
- Barbados
- Bermuda
- British Virgin Islands
- Cuba
- Dominica
- Dominican Republic
- Grenada
- Guadeloupe
- Haiti
- Jamaica
- Montserrat
- Netherlands Antilles
- Puerto Rico
- Saint Lucia
- Saint Vincent and the Grenadines
- Trinidad and Tobago
- United States Virgin Islands

== History ==
The West Indies Rugby League Federation was formed in 2003. The West Indies team has participated in the Middlesex Nines (2004) and York Nines (2004, 2005) competitions.

The West Indies national side was planning to be involved in the 2008 Rugby League World Cup qualifying in the United States in 2006 but pulled out.

=== Match vs South Africa ===
The West Indies' only international fixture was played against South Africa, then known as the Wild Dogs, on 9 October 2004 at New River Stadium in London, England, winning 50–22. Jamaican Jermaine Coleman was initially named to play but was replaced by Davey.

Nat.	Name	Position	Club	T	G	DG	Points
	Justin Hunter	Fullback	Bradford Bulls	0	0	0	0
(Jamaica)	Joe Brown	Wing	London Broncos	0	0	0	0
	Danny Herbert	Centre	Hunslet Hawks	2	0	0	8
	Danny Mills	Centre	Sheffield Eagles	1	0	0	4
	Corey Simms	Wing	South London Storm	0	0	0	0
	Liam Jarvis	Stand-off	Bradford Dudley Hill	0	7/10	0	14
	Tony Williams	Scrum-half	Huddersfield Giants	1	0	0	4
(Trinidad and Tobago)	Selwyn St. Bernard	Prop	Basingstoke (RU)	0	0	0	0
(Jamaica)	Jamaine Wray	Hooker	Hunslet Hawks	0	0	0	0
(Jamaica)	Alex Rowe	Prop	Castleford Tigers	2	0	0	8
(Barbados)	Dominic Peters	Second-row	Unattached	1	0	0	4
(Jamaica)	Irvin Greenwood	Second-row	London Broncos	1	0	0	4
	Ricky Davey	Loose forward	South London Storm	0	0	0	0
	Steve Elms	Interchange	London Broncos	0	0	0	0
	Jamie Vernon	Interchange	London Broncos	1	0	0	4
(Trinidad and Tobago)	Hayden James	Interchange	New York Knights	0	0	0	0
(Trinidad and Tobago)	Nigel Arismendez	Interchange	Gateshead Thunder	0	0	0	0

== See also ==
- Jamaica national rugby league team
