= Michael Ostick =

English rugby league footballer and coach

Personal information
- Full name: Michael Ostick
- Born: 23 January 1988 (age 37)

Playing information
- Position: Prop
Club
Years	Team	Pld	T	G	FG	P
2008–09	Widnes Vikings
2008(loan)	Barrow Raiders
2009	Rochdale Hornets
2009–11	Halifax
2012–18	Leigh Centurions	54	5	0	0	20
	Total	54	5	0	0	20
- As of 19 May 2021

Michael Ostick is a former professional rugby league footballer for Leigh.

Ostick originally played for Widnes St Marie's before turning professional with Widnes. After making his way in the club's academy, Ostick débuted for the 'Chemics' in 2008 and made seven substitute appearances.

Later in his first season Michael enjoyed a loan spell with Barrow that brought a further five games and the first two tries of his professional career (against Hunslet and London Skolars).

The following season saw Ostick make 27 appearances for Widnes, including twenty starts and he was consistently one of the top performers. It was a surprise to many when a contract offer was withdrawn and he was released.

Michael then agreed an offer from Rochdale Hornets. A seven game stint came to an end when Halifax enquired after his services and Ostick was on the move again.

It proved controversial as Michael played in a Challenge Cup tie against Swinton in Round Four for Halifax having already represented Rochdale in Round Three. As a result Halifax were disqualified from the competition.

Ostick played in the Qualifying Semi-Final at Featherstone Rovers in 2010 but missed out on selection to the Grand Final against the same team and watched on as a Bob Beswick inspired Halifax edged Rovers in extra-time.

Injuries restricted his appearances for Halifax during the 2011 season, at the end of which he was released to join Leigh.

Michael also works for a company called SWITCH alongside other professional rugby player Mick Nanyn operating out of the Leigh Sports Village where they help to promote motivation and a feeling of accomplishment in people who have been struggling to find work. During said course they go on Aerial Assault courses and work out in the Gym on various pieces of equipment.

As of 2018, he had retired and had become the under-16s coach at Leigh.
