= Gareth Price =

Wales international rugby league footballer

Personal information
- Full name: Gareth Price
- Born: 26 August 1980 (age 46) Swansea, Wales
- Height: 6 ft 1 in (1.86 m)
- Weight: 18 st 6 lb (117 kg)

Playing information

Rugby union
Club
Years	Team	Pld	T	G	FG	P
	Hendy RFC
2000–01	→ Neath RFC (loan)
	Total	0	0	0	0	0

Rugby league
- Position: Prop, Hooker, Second-row
Club
Years	Team	Pld	T	G	FG	P
1997–99	St. Helens	11	2	0	0	8
2002	Leigh Centurions	30	4	0	0	16
2002	London Broncos	4	3	0	0	12
2002	Salford City Reds	2	0	0	0	0
2003–05	Rochdale Hornets	52	14	0	0	56
2006	Hull Kingston Rovers	12	1	0	0	4
2006	Crusaders	8	0	0	0	0
2007	Widnes Vikings	14	0	0	0	0
2008	Leigh Centurions
	Total	133	24	0	0	96
Representative
Years	Team	Pld	T	G	FG	P
1999–06	Wales	10	1	0	0	4
- Source: As of 11 Jun 2024

Gareth Price (born 26 August 1980) is a Welsh former rugby union and rugby league footballer who played in the 1990s and 2000s. He played club level rugby union (RU) for Hendy RFC (in Hendy, Swansea, Wales), and Neath RFC (loan), and representative level rugby league for Wales, and at club level for St. Helens, the London Broncos, and the Salford City Reds in the Super League, and the Leigh Centurions (two spells), the Rochdale Hornets, Hull Kingston Rovers, the Crusaders, and the Widnes Vikings in the National Leagues, as a prop, hooker, or second-row.

== Background ==
Gareth Price was born in Swansea, Wales.

== Playing career ==
Price was a revelation with Widnes, in 2007 playing in 18 games, and he has been noted for his ability to break a tackle, whilst Gareth's defence is also highly regarded.

== International honours ==
Gareth Price won caps for Wales while at St. Helens, Rochdale Hornets, and Celtic Crusaders.
