= Oliver Wilkes =

Scottish international rugby league footballer (born 1980)

Ollie Wilkes
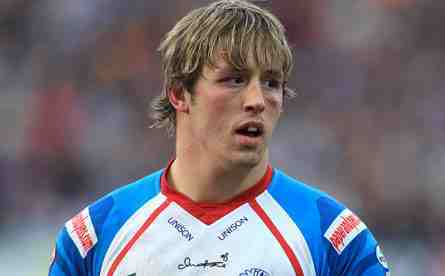

Personal information
- Full name: Oliver Wilkes
- Born: 2 May 1980 (age 46) Ulverston, Cumbria, England

Playing information
- Height: 6 ft 1 in (1.85 m)
- Weight: 17 st 4 lb (110 kg)
- Position: Prop, Second-row, Loose forward
Club
| Years | Team | Pld | T | G | FG | P |
|---|---|---|---|---|---|---|
| 1998–99 | Sheffield Eagles | 1 | 0 | 0 | 0 | 0 |
| 2000–01 | Huddersfield Giants | 8 | 0 | 0 | 0 | 0 |
| 2001–03 | Keighley Cougars | 68 | 20 | 5 | 0 | 90 |
| 2004–05 | Leigh Centurions | 44 | 9 | 0 | 0 | 36 |
| 2006 | Whitehaven | 6 | 2 | 0 | 0 | 8 |
| 2006 | Wigan Warriors | 6 | 0 | 0 | 0 | 0 |
| 2006–07 | Widnes Vikings | 47 | 17 | 0 | 0 | 68 |
| 2008–09 | Wakefield Trinity Wildcats | 60 | 7 | 0 | 0 | 28 |
| 2010–11 | Harlequins RL | 56 | 5 | 0 | 0 | 20 |
| 2012–13 | Wakefield Trinity Wildcats | 51 | 4 | 0 | 0 | 16 |
| 2014–15 | Leigh Centurions | 55 | 8 | 0 | 0 | 32 |
| 2016–17 | Barrow Raiders | 51 | 10 | 1 | 0 | 42 |
| 2018–19 | Workington Town | 45 | 16 | 0 | 0 | 64 |
| | Total | 498 | 98 | 6 | 0 | 404 |
Representative
| Years | Team | Pld | T | G | FG | P |
| 2003 | Cumbria | 1 | 1 | 0 | 0 | 4 |
| 2003–18 | Scotland | 17 | 2 | 2 | 0 | 12 |

Oliver Wilkes (born 2 May 1980) is a former Scotland international rugby League footballer who played as a prop, second-row and loose forward in the 1990s, 2000s and 2010s.

He has played for the Sheffield Eagles, Huddersfield Giants, Keighley Cougars, Leigh Centurions (two spells), Whitehaven, Wigan Warriors, Widnes Vikings, Wakefield Trinity Wildcats (two spells), Harlequins RL, Barrow Raiders and Workington Town.

== Background ==
Wilkes was born in Ulverston, Cumbria, England.

== Playing career ==
=== Sheffield Eagles ===
Wilkes began his career at Sheffield Eagles, making his Super League début as an 18-year-old in 1998.

=== Huddersfield Giants ===
He also played in Super League for Huddersfield Giants.

=== Keighley Cougars ===
Wilkes then joined the Keighley Cougars in the Northern Ford Premiership.

=== Leigh Centurions ===
He then spent time at Leigh Centurions, featuring for them in Super League in 2005.

=== Wigan Warriors ===
Wilkes briefly returned to Super League with Wigan Warriors in 2006. In 2022, Wilkes admitted that he had taken performance-enhancing drugs at his previous club, Whitehaven, prior to his to move to Wigan.

=== Widnes Vikings ===
His next move was to the Widnes Vikings. He played for Widnes Vikings in the 2006 National League Grand Final. After the season, he required reconstructive shoulder surgery. In 2007, he scored 15 tries in 34 games with Widnes Vikings before returning to Super League with Wakefield Trinity Wildcats the following year.

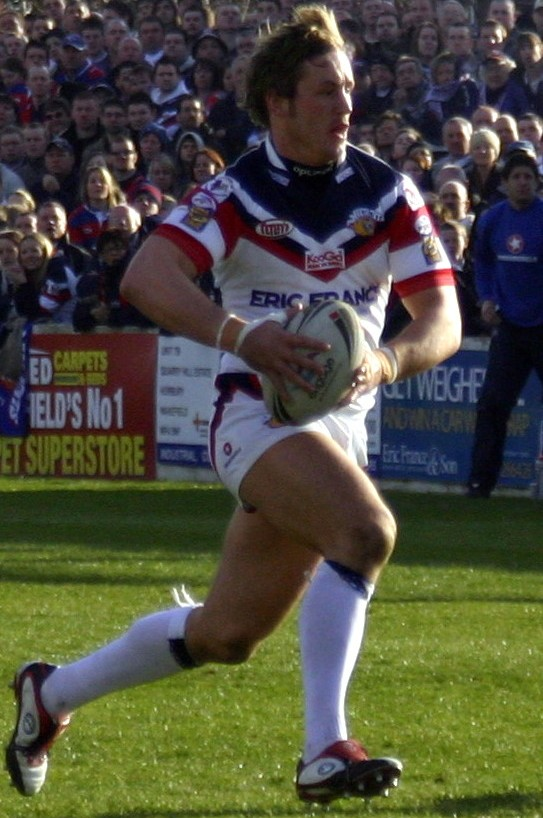
Wilkes in action for the Wakefield Trinity Wildcats

=== Wakefield Trinity Wildcats ===
He returned to the Super League with Wakefield Trinity Wildcatsin 2007.

Wilkes was a consistent feature in the 2009 Wakefield Trinity Wildcats squad, and they managed to secure a fifth-place finish within the Super League reaching the play-offs.

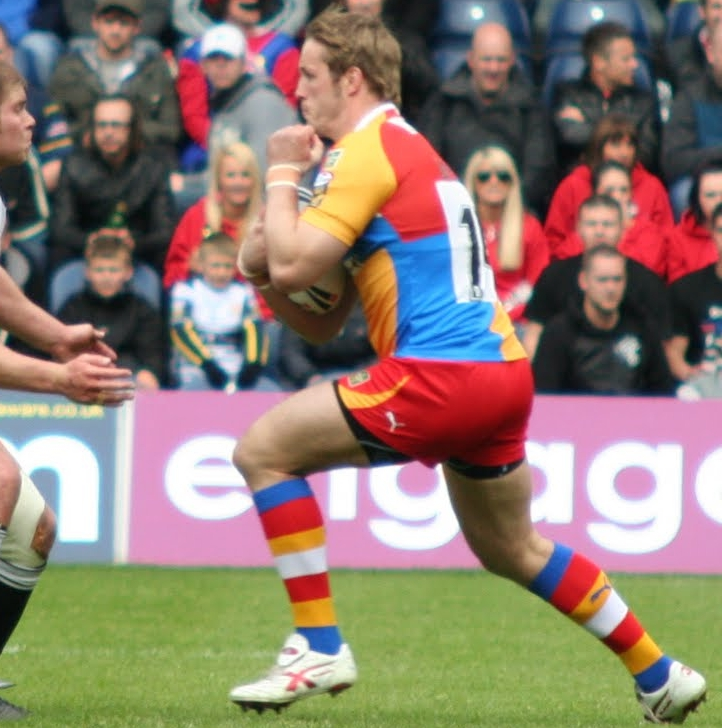
Wilkes in action for Harlequins Rugby League

=== Harlequins Rugby League ===
He then moved to Harlequins RL, spending two years there before returning to Wakefield Trinity Wildcats.

=== Wakefield Trinity Wildcats ===
Wilkes rejoined Wakefield Trinity Wildcats in 2012.

=== Leigh ===
Wilkes left Wakefield Trinity Wildcats to rejoin Leigh in 2014, captained the side Leigh to the League Leaders' Shield, and the Championship Grand Final victory. At the end of the 2015 season, he announced he was leaving Leigh to sign for his hometown club Barrow.

=== Barrow Raiders ===
Wilkes left the Barrow Raiders after spending the 2016 and 2017 seasons at the League 1 club.

=== Workington Town ===
Wilkes joined Workington Town ahead of the 2018 season. He was named club captain for the 2018 season, he played for town for 2 years making 43 appearances and scoring 18 tries, Wilkes announced his retirement in August 2019.

== International career ==
He was named to the Scotland training squad for the 2008 Rugby League World Cup and was named to the full Scotland squad for the 2008 Rugby League World Cup. He scored the winning try over Fiji in Scotland's first ever World Cup win. Wilkes was recalled to the Scotland squad in 2018, at the age of 38, for the European championships.
