= James Webster (rugby league) =

Australian RL coach & footballer (born 1979)

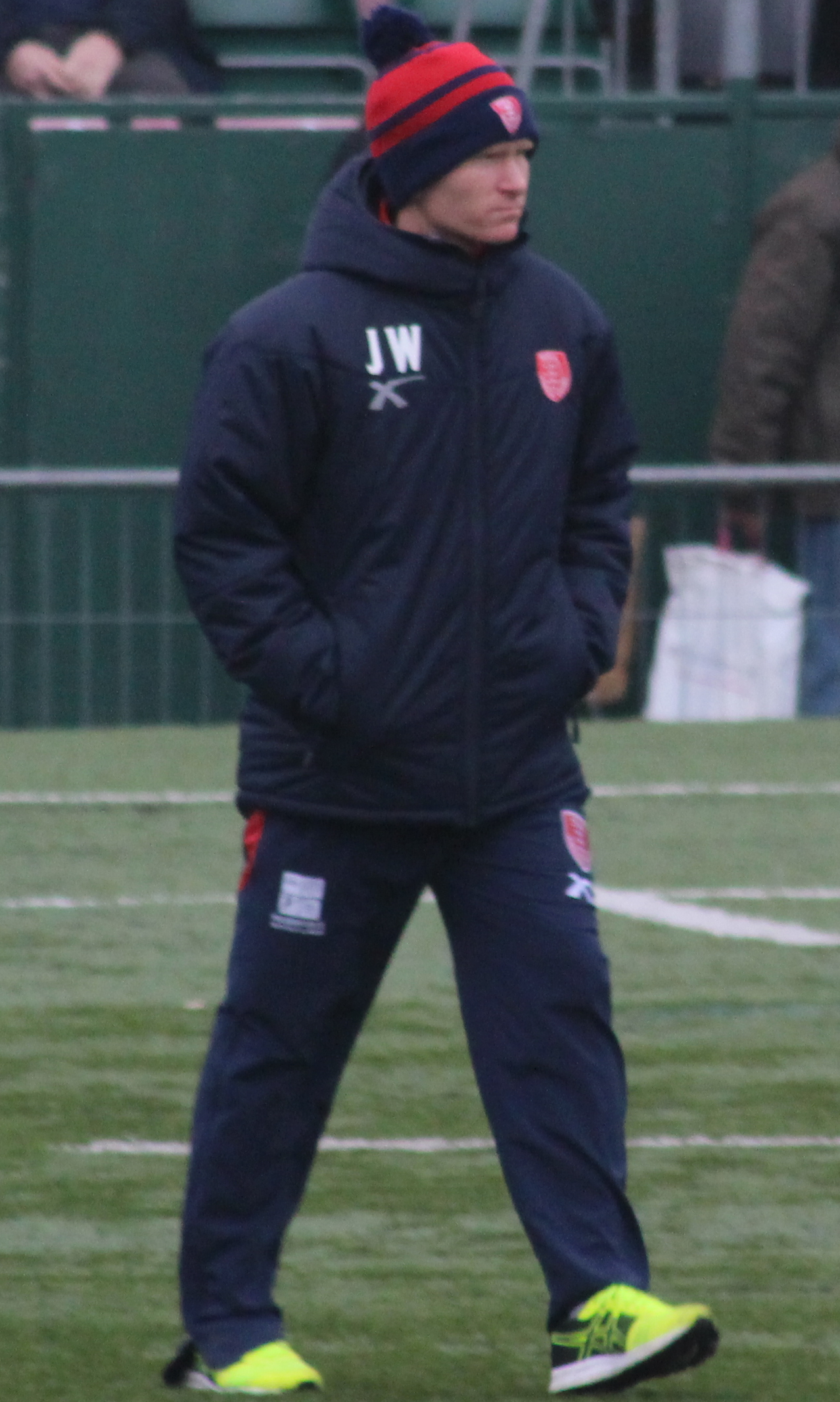

Personal information
- Full name: James Webster
- Born: 11 July 1979 (age 47) Sydney, New South Wales, Australia

Playing information
- Position: Halfback
Club
Years	Team	Pld	T	G	FG	P
1999	Balmain Tigers	9	3	0	0	12
2002–04	Parramatta Eels	22	3	0	0	12
2005–08	Hull Kingston Rovers	94	33	7	9	155
2008	Hull FC	1	0	0	0	0
2009–10	Widnes Vikings	43	10	0	0	40
	Total	169	49	7	9	219

Coaching information
Club
Years	Team	Gms	W	D	L	W%
2014–15	Wakefield Trinity Wildcats	36	9	6	21	25
2016	Hull Kingston Rovers	32	10	0	20	31
2019	Hull Kingston Rovers	0	0	0	0
2020–21	Featherstone Rovers	36	33	0	3	92
	Total	104	52	6	44	50
- Source: As of 20 October 2021
- Relatives: Andrew Webster (brother)

James Webster (born 11 July 1979) is an Australian professional rugby league football coach who was the head coach of Featherstone Rovers in the Championship, and a former professional player.

He was previously of the Wakefield Trinity Wildcats and Hull Kingston Rovers. Webster played as a scrum-half or hooker in the National Rugby League for Australian clubs Balmain Tigers and Parramatta Eels. He then played in the Super League for Hull Kingston Rovers, Hull F.C. and the Widnes Vikings. Webster stayed in England after retiring from playing and became a coach.

== Background ==
Webster was born in Sydney, New South Wales, Australia.

He is the older brother of former rugby league footballer and current New Zealand Warriors head coach, Andrew Webster

== Playing career ==
=== Balmain Tigers ===
Webster played rugby league in his home town of Sydney for Balmain. Webster played in Balmain's final ever match as a first grade side, a 42–14 loss against Canberra. Balmain then went on to merge with fellow foundation club Western Suburbs as part of the NRL rationalisation policy.

=== Parramatta Eels ===
Webster then moved to the Parramatta Eels, making 22 appearances in his time with Parramatta.

=== Hull Kingston Rovers ===
Webster was released from Hull Kingston Rovers on 2 May 2008.

=== Hull FC ===
Webster eventually joined rivals Hull FC. After only one game in a black and white jersey – Webster was released from his contract.

=== Widnes Vikings ===
It was then announced he had signed a two-year contract with Widnes. He joined National League One side Widnes for the 2009 season.

== Coaching career ==
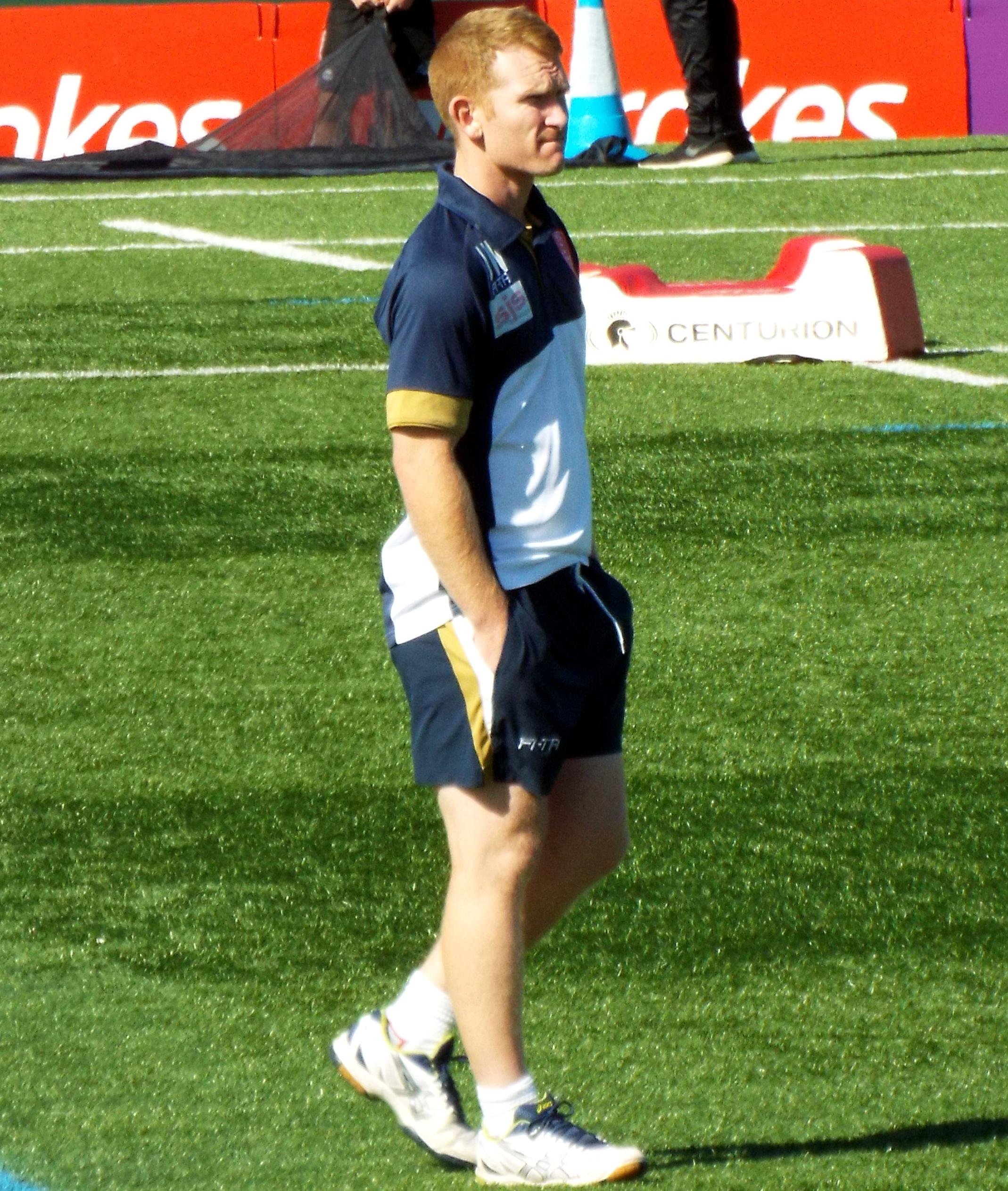
Webster as Head Coach of Hull KR

=== Hull FC ===
Webster turned his back on his playing career to focus on his coaching role with former club Hull, when he returned to the black and whites as Assistant Coach in 2010. He worked closely alongside Head Coach Richard Agar and fellow Assistant Coach Andy Last in his first major coaching opportunity, whilst he is also involved in the development of other young coaches with the Rugby Football League. In early 2014, Webster was playing for amateur rugby club Hornsea RUFC, he earned one cap and also offered coaching support.

=== Wakefield Trinity Wildcats ===
On 2 June 2014, Webster replaced the Wakefield Trinity Wildcats head coach Richard Agar as the new head coach of the Super League club. On 19 May 2015, Webster left Wakefield Trinity Wildcats.

=== Hull Kingston Rovers ===
In March 2016, Webster was named Interim Coach of Hull Kingston Rovers replacing the sacked Chris Chester. Webster became the assistant coach at Hull Kingston Rovers when he was replaced by Tim Sheens as head coach from the 2017 season.

=== Featherstone Rovers ===
In October 2019, was named head coach of Featherstone Rovers replacing Ryan Carr who return home to Australia. Webster guided Featherstone to the 2021 Million Pound Game where they lost against Toulouse Olympique. On 22 October 2021, he stood down from the role as head coach at Featherstone by mutual consent.
