= Loz Wildbore =

English rugby league footballer

Laurence Wildbore
Personal information
- Full name: Laurence Wildbore
- Born: 23 September 1984 (age 40); Kingston upon Hull, England

Playing information
- Position: Fullback, Stand-off, Loose forward
Club
| Years | Team | Pld | T | G | FG | P |
|---|---|---|---|---|---|---|
| 2004–05 | Hull Kingston Rovers | 14 | 3 | 40 | 0 | 92 |
| 2007–08 | Featherstone Rovers | 42 | 13 | 7 | 2 | 68 |
| 2008 | Doncaster | 12 | 4 | 15 | 0 | 46 |
| 2009 | Widnes Vikings | 14 | 5 | 0 | 0 | 20 |
| 2009(loan) | →Dewsbury Rams | 3 | 2 | 0 | 0 | 8 |
| 2009(loan) | →York City Knights | 5 | 6 | 3 | 1 | 31 |
| 2010–12 | South Wales Scorpions | 35 | 7 | 35 | 1 | 99 |
| | Total | 125 | 40 | 100 | 4 | 364 |
- As of 25 May 2021

Loz Wildbore (born 23 September 1984) is an English rugby league footballer who has played in the 2000s and 2010s. He has played at representative level for British Amateur Rugby League Association (2004 tour of Australia), Great Britain (Academy) and England (Academy), and at club level for West Hull A.R.L.F.C., Hull F.C. (Academy), Hull Kingston Rovers (c. 2005), the Wakefield Trinity Wildcats (A-Team), Doncaster, Featherstone Rovers (2007...2008), the Widnes Vikings (c. 2008…2009), the Dewsbury Rams, the York City Knights (c. 2009), and in Championship One for the South Wales Scorpions, and for Hunslet Hawks (c. 2011) and the Myton Warriors ARLFC (c. 2017), as an occasional goal-kicking fullback, stand-off or loose forward.
