= Stephen Bannister =

English rugby league footballer

Steve Bannister
Personal information
- Full name: Stephen Bannister
- Born: 18 October 1987 (age 37); Billinge Higher End, Wigan, England
- Height: 5 ft 11 in (1.80 m)
- Weight: 13 st 3 lb (84 kg)

Playing information
- Position: Second-row
Club
Years	Team	Pld	T	G	FG	P
2006–07	St. Helens	3	0	0	0	0
2007	→ Whitehaven (loan)	6	0	0	0	0
2007	Harlequins RL	6	0	0	0	0
2009	Widnes Vikings	4	3	1	0	14
2009–11	Halifax	45	14	0	0	56
2011	Sporting Olympique Avignon
2012	Rochdale Hornets	9	4	0	0	12
2013–14	North Wales Crusaders	22	6	1	0	26
2014	Hemel Stags	2	1	0	0	4
2015	Whitehaven	3	0	0	0	0
2016	London Skolars	3	0	0	0	0
	Total	103	28	2	0	112
- Source: As of 6 February 2019

Stephen Bannister (born 18 October 1987), also known by the nickname of "Ste", is an English rugby league footballer who has played in the 2000s and 2010s. He has played at representative level for England (Age Group), and at club level for Blackbrook A.R.L.F.C., in the Super League for St. Helens, in National League One for Whitehaven (two spells, including the first on loan), in the Super League for the Harlequins RL, for the Widnes Vikings, in the Co-Operative Championship for Halifax, in Elite One Championship for Sporting Olympique Avignon, for the Rochdale Hornets, in Kingstone Press League 1 for the North Wales Crusaders, for the Hemel Stags and the London Skolars, as a second-row.

== Background ==
Stephen Bannister was born in Billinge, Merseyside, England, he was a pupil at Newton-le-Willows Community High School, leaving in 2005.

== Playing career ==
During November 2006, Bannister was promoted to train with St. Helens' first-team squad, making his début on 19 August 2006 against the Catalans Dragons. He later played several games for Whitehaven on loan in 2007.

Bannister signed for London club Harlequins RL following the completion of his loan with the Cumbrian National League One side in June 2007.

Bannister's position of choice was second-row. He was also able to operate as a centre, and played also as an England age-group international. Bannister is a second-row who has been compared to Great Britain's international Lee Gilmour.
