= Danny Mills (rugby league) =

Jamaican professional rugby footballer (living)

Personal information
- Full name: Danny Mills
- Born: Jamaica

Playing information
- Position: Centre
Club
| Years | Team | Pld | T | G | FG | P |
|---|---|---|---|---|---|---|
| 2004–05 | Sheffield Eagles | 0 | 0 | 0 | 0 | 0 |
| 2006 | Doncaster RLFC | 0 | 0 | 0 | 0 | 0 |
| 2006–11 | Sheffield Eagles | 111 | 36 | 0 | 0 | 144 |
| 2012 | Batley Bulldogs | 0 | 0 | 0 | 0 | 0 |
| | Total | 111 | 36 | 0 | 0 | 144 |
Representative
| Years | Team | Pld | T | G | FG | P |
| 2004 | West Indies | 1 | 1 | 0 | 0 | 4 |
- Source: As of 28 February 2021

Danny Mills is a professional rugby league footballer who played on the wing for the Batley Bulldogs.

He formerly played for Huddersfield, Doncaster, Widnes and Sheffield Eagles.

In October 2024, Mills played for the West Indies in their match against South Africa.
