= Andrew Kirk (rugby league) =

English rugby league footballer

Personal information
- Full name: Andrew Kirk
- Born: 2 August 1982 (age 43) Leeds, England

Playing information
- Position: Wing, Centre
Club
Years	Team	Pld	T	G	FG	P
2001–02	Leeds Rhinos	8	0	0	0	0
2003–04	Salford City Reds	48	29	0	0	116
2005	Wakefield Trinity Wildcats	9	2	0	0	8
2006	Halifax	32	15	0	0	60
2007	Widnes Vikings	17	8	0	0	32
2008–09	Featherstone Rovers	50	18	0	0	72
	Total	164	72	0	0	288

Andrew "Andy" Kirk (born 2 August 1982) is an English former professional rugby league footballer who played in the 2000s. He played at representative level for Great Britain (Academy), and Yorkshire (Academy), and at club level for Pudsey ARLFC, the Leeds Rhinos, the Salford City Reds, the Wakefield Trinity Wildcats, Halifax, the Widnes Vikings and Featherstone Rovers, as a wing, or centre.

== Background ==
Kirk was born in Leeds, West Yorkshire, England.

== Playing career ==
Kirk joined Leeds Rhinos Academy in 1999, while at Leeds he represented Great Britain (Academy), and Yorkshire (Academy), he was Leeds Alliance Player of the Year in 2000, he made his first-team debut in 2001's Super League VI at the Warrington Wolves in Daryl Powell's first game in charge, he went on to make eight appearances in total for the Leeds club. In 2003 he went on loan to the Salford City Reds, a move that was made permanent after Salford City Reds' successful National League One Grand Final winning season.
