= Andy Kain =

English rugby league footballer

Personal information
- Full name: Andrew Kain
- Born: 1 September 1985 (age 39)

Playing information
- Position: Stand-off, Scrum-half
Club
Years	Team	Pld	T	G	FG	P
2004–06	Castleford Tigers	44	17	44	2	158
2007	Widnes Vikings	9	3	0	0	12
2007–14	Featherstone Rovers	208	126	6	1	517
2015	Hunslet Hawks	18	4	0	0	16
2016–17	Dewsbury Rams	38	13	0	0	52
	Total	317	163	50	3	755
- Source: As of 29 June 2017

Andrew Kain (born 1 September 1985) is a former professional rugby league footballer who played at club level for the Castleford Tigers, Widnes Vikings, Featherstone Rovers, Hunslet Hawks and the Dewsbury Rams, as a goal-kicking stand-off or scrum-half.

== Career ==
Kain joined Featherstone Rovers on loan from the Widnes Vikings in 2007 and was part of the grand final-winning team, the loan deal was made permanent in 2008.

He announced his retirement in May 2017.

== Genealogical information ==
Andy Kain is the cousin of the rugby league fullback/wing who played in the 2000s and 2010s for Featherstone Rovers, and the Hunslet Hawks; Stuart Kain.
