= York International 9s =

York International 9s is an international rugby league nines tournament taking place in York, England. It is held at Heworth A.R.L.F.C.'s Elmpark Way ground on the north east side of the city. The 2007 tournament took place on Saturday 14 July.

The tournament was first held in 2002 as part of City of York Council's Queen's Golden Jubilee celebrations. The competition was awarded a 5* rating from the Rugby League European Federation and was the first nines event in Europe.

The tournament last took place in 2009.

== Format ==
The 2007 event has been streamlined with all the competitions taking place on one day rather than two, and eight teams, rather than 12, competing in the Fairfax Cup. The new competition format has the eight teams split into two pools of four, with the top two from each group qualifying for the semi-finals. The bottom two in each group will compete in play-offs to determine finishing positions fifth to eighth. In 2009 the RFL invited the Combined Services Referees Society to send officials from all three services to participate. On the day, five officials took part including one who flew in from Germany alongside officials from the RFL.

== Teams taking part ==
Fairfax Cup
Group 1: York City Knights, York Ironsides, Espagne Origine, Lyon-Villeurbanne-Rhone
Group 2: Dewsbury Rams, The Army, FC Lézignan XIII, The Ambassadors

Archbishop Dolben Cup
Group 1: Police Sport UK, Beach Boys, York RUFC, Royal Navy
Group 2: Featherstone Rovers, Royal Air Force, York Tigers, Broughton Rangers

== Trophies ==
Teams from England, France and in previous years from Russia compete for the Fairfax Cup, named after Sir Thomas Fairfax. In recent years, this has recently begun to feature professional teams from the National Leagues.

First competed for in 2006, the Archbishop Dolben cup is competed for by "development teams" that are not considered strong enough to take part in the main Fairfax cup. Many of the teams represent the military services of the UK.

There is also a junior grade Marston Moor competition for York and District schools. It is named after the English Civil War battle between Cavaliers and Roundheads. Preliminary rounds will take place on Wednesday 14 June at Heworth Rugby Club. The semi finals and final will then be part of the York International 9s Festival. From 2007, the competition will be expanded to include secondary schools.

== Past winners ==
=== Fairfax cup ===
- 2002 London KooGas
- 2003 Lezignan - Corbieres XIII
- 2004 West Indies Wahoos
- 2005 East Hull
- 2006 York City Knights
- 2007 The Ambassadors
- 2008 York Ironsides
- 2009 Police Sport UK

=== Archbishop Dolben cup ===
- 2006 Police Sport UK
- 2007 Police Sport UK
- 2008 Fife Lions
- 2009 Royal Dragoon Guards

=== Marston Moor cup ===
- 2002 Ralph Butterfield Primary School
- 2003 St. Oswalds Primary School
- 2004 Ralph Butterfield Primary School
- 2005 Wigginton Primary School
- 2006 Woodthorpe Primary School
- 2007 Year 6: Clifton Without Junior School, Year 7: Canon Lee School, Year 8: King James School, Year 9: Barlby High School, Year 10: Joseph Rowntree School
- 2008
