= Sam Thompson (rugby league) =

English rugby league footballer

Personal information
- Full name: Samuel Lee Thompson
- Born: 9 October 1986 (age 39) England
- Height: 6 ft 1 in (1.85 m)
- Weight: 17 st 7 lb (111 kg)

Playing information
- Position: Prop
Club
Years	Team	Pld	T	G	FG	P
2008	St. Helens	14	0	0	0	0
2009	Widnes Vikings	20	5	0	0	20
2009	Harlequins RL	4	0	0	0	0
2010	Barrow Raiders	6	2	0	0	8
2010	Whitehaven
	Total	44	7	0	0	28

Sam "Sammy"/"Tonka" Thompson (born 9 October 1986) is an English former rugby league footballer who played for St. Helens in the Super League. Thompson's position of choice was at prop.

He made his début in the Challenge Cup victory against the London Skolars on 20 April 2008.

Captain of England u19s and Captain of Great Britain u21s

Saints Reserves Captain 2008

He joined National League One side the Widnes Vikings for the 2009 season.
