= Richard Varkulis =

English rugby league footballer

Personal information
- Born: 21 May 1982 (age 43) unknown
- Height: 188 cm (6 ft 2 in)
- Weight: 105 kg (16 st 7 lb)

Playing information
- Position: Centre, Prop
Club
Years	Team	Pld	T	G	FG	P
2000	Leigh Centurions	2	0	0	0	0
2004	Warrington	6	4	0	0	16
2004–2006	Rochdale	62	27	0	0	108
2007–2008	Halifax	58	24	0	0	88
2009–2011	Widnes	79	31	0	0	124
2012	Whitehaven	25	8	0	0	32
	Total	232	94	0	0	368

Richard Varkulis (born 21 May 1982) is a former rugby league footballer whose previous clubs include; the Leigh Centurions, the Warrington Wolves, the Rochdale Hornets, Halifax (two spells, including the first on loan), the Widnes Vikings and Whitehaven.

Varkulis began his career with Leigh Centurions Academy and spent part of the 2002 season with Wollongong Bulls in Australia after representing British Amateur Rugby League Association Young Lions in 2001. He began his professional career by signing for the Warrington Wolves in 2003 and finished top try scorer with thirty tries in twenty-four appearances for the Senior Academy. Varkulis scored three tries in five appearances during 2004's Super League IX for the Warrington Wolves. He spent loan spells with the Rochdale Hornets and Halifax.

Widnes Vikings signed Varkulis for the 2009 season as a strong running Centre from Halifax scoring 10 tries in 22 appearances. He picked up a Northern Rail Cup Winners medal in 2009 scoring a try in the 34–18 victory over Barrow Raiders and ended the season signing a two-year contract extension with Widnes Vikings until the end of 2011 season.

In 2010, Varkulis scored 10 tries in 22 appearances including a hat trick against Barrow Raiders.

In 2011, although still wearing the number 3 shirt, new Widnes Coach Denis Betts switched Varkulis to Prop where he has used his size and strength to become an excellent asset to the Vikings pack. He made 27 appearances and scored seven tries including a Challenge Cup try against Hull F.C.

Despite being voted 3rd in the Player of the Year Awards, Varkulis was released by Widnes Vikings at the end of the 2011 season along with 12 other players as the Vikings prepared for life in Super League. He became a Whitehaven player in November 2011 for 2012 season making 26 appearances and scoring 8 tries.

In 2013, Varkulis switched codes and joined Chester RUFC and operated as an Inside Centre.

== Career statistics ==
Club	Season					
Club	Season	Apps	Tries	Goals	Field goals	Points
Warrington	2004	6	4	0	0	16
Rochdale	2004	9	5	0	0	20
Rochdale	2005	26	13	0	0	52
Rochdale	2006	27	9	0	0	36
Halifax	2007	30	15	0	0	60
Halifax	2008	26	7	0	0	28
Widnes	2009	30	14	0	0	56
Widnes	2010	22	10	0	0	40
Widnes	2011	27	7	0	0	28
Whitehaven	2012	25	8	0	0	32
