= Toa Kohe-Love =

New Zealand rugby league footballer

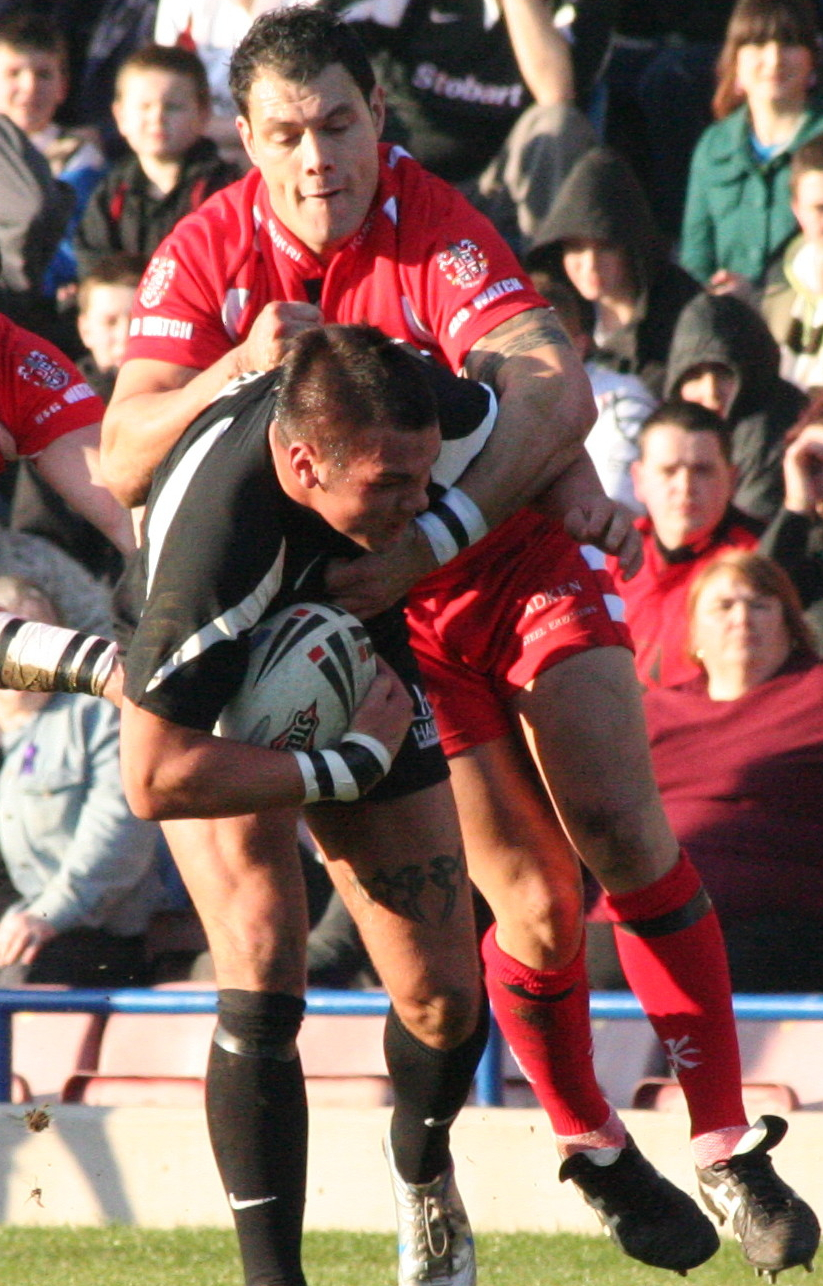

Personal information
- Born: 2 December 1976 (age 48); Wellington, New Zealand

Playing information
- Height: 180 cm (5 ft 11 in)
- Weight: 90 kg (14 st 2 lb)
- Position: Centre
Club
Years	Team	Pld	T	G	FG	P
1996–01	Warrington Wolves	130	75	0	0	300
2002–03	Hull FC	46	21	0	0	84
2004	Bradford Bulls	3	0	0	0	0
2005–06	Warrington Wolves	55	21	0	0	84
2007	Widnes Vikings	25	17	0	0	68
2008	Leigh Centurions	17	10	0	0	40
2009–10	Widnes Vikings	29	15	0	0	60
	Total	305	159	0	0	636
Representative
Years	Team	Pld	T	G	FG	P
2000	Aotearoa Māori	3	0	0	0	0

Toa Kohe-Love (born 2 December 1976) is a New Zealand former professional rugby league footballer who played as a centre. Kohe-Love represented Aotearoa Māori at the 2000 Rugby League World Cup.

== Early years ==
After growing up playing rugby union in Wellington Kohe-Love joined the new Auckland Warriors franchise on a development contract in 1995. He then moved to the Warrington Wolves in 1996.

== Playing career ==
Toa Kohe-Love has previously played for the Bradford Bulls, two spells at Widnes Vikings, Warrington Wolves, Leigh Centurions and Hull FC. He is best remembered for two spells with the Warrington Wolves where he was leading try-scorer in the Super League era.

In October 2007 Kohe-Love joined the Leigh Centurions after experiencing defeat in the 2007 National League One Grand Final with the Widnes Vikings. Following the defeat and missing out on a place in the Super League at the last hurdle for a second consecutive year the Widnes Vikings went into administration and were forced to sell most of their star players. Toa Kohe-Love was one of the stars to leave to join the Leigh Centurions along with Denis Moran, Gareth Price, Lee Doran, Mike Morrison and Martin Keavney. He then returned to Widnes in 2009.

== Post playing ==
Toa Kohe-Love is the father of the rugby league footballer who has played for the Warrington Wolves Academy; Joe Kohe-Love.
