= Alex Rowe (rugby league) =

Malta & West Indies international rugby league footballer

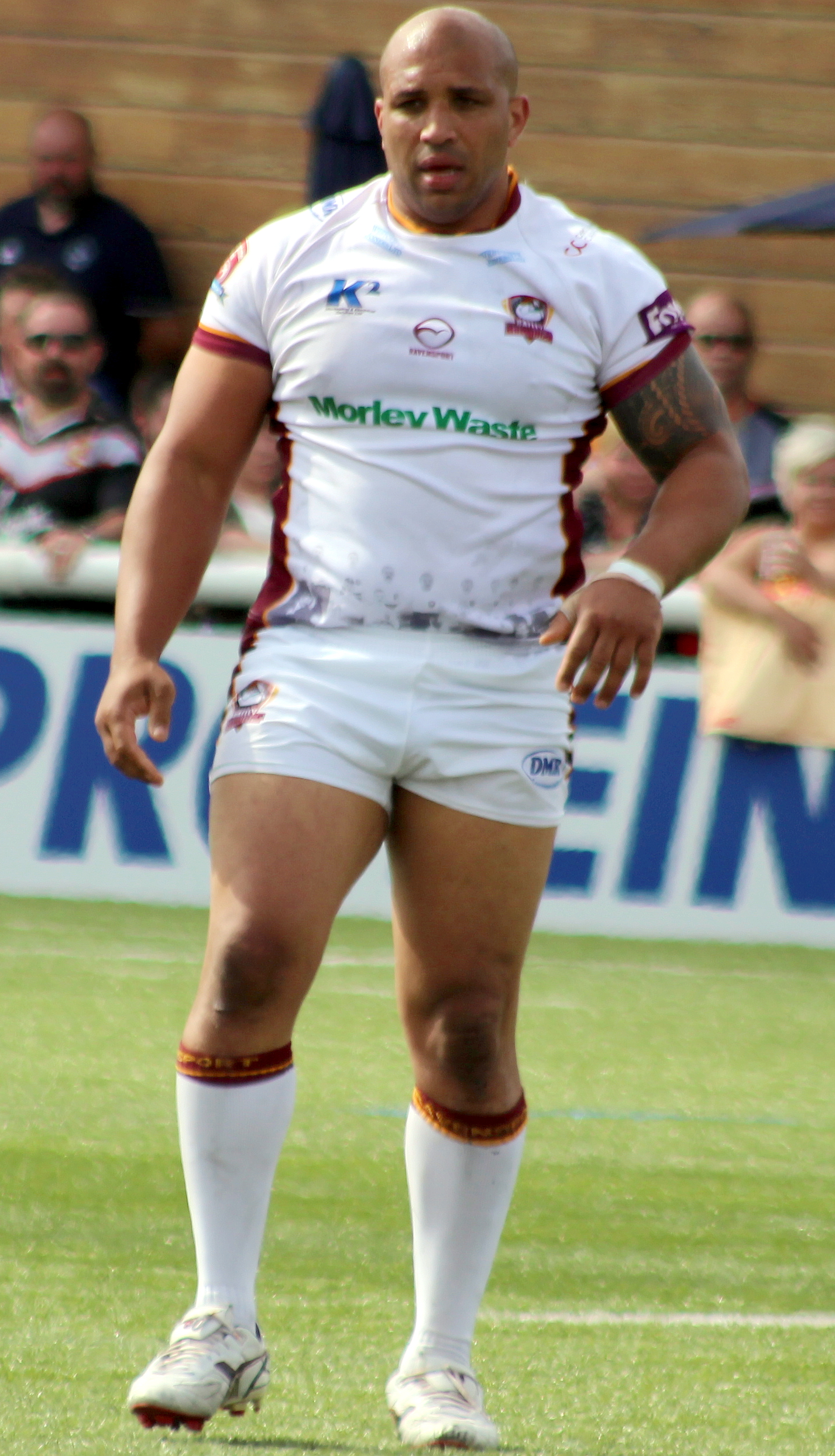

Personal information
- Full name: Alex Rowe
- Born: 11 March 1985 (age 41) Lee Green, London, England
- Height: 5 ft 11 in (1.80 m)
- Weight: 17 st 4 lb (110 kg)

Playing information
- Position: Prop, Loose forward
Club
Years	Team	Pld	T	G	FG	P
2003–04	London Broncos
2005–06	Castleford Tigers	4	0	0	0	0
2007	Doncaster
2008–12	Sheffield Eagles
2012(loan)	→ Doncaster	4	1	0	0	4
2013–18	Batley Bulldogs	149	18	1	0	74
2019–20	Newcastle Thunder	13	1	0	0	4
2020–21	Hunslet	0	0	0	0	0
	Total	170	20	1	0	82
Representative
Years	Team	Pld	T	G	FG	P
	Malta	3	1	0	0	4
2004	West Indies	1	2	0	0	8
- Source: As of 28 February 2021

Alex Rowe (born 11 March 1985) is a Malta international rugby league footballer who plays for the Hunslet in League 1. He plays as a prop and can also play as a loose-forward.

== Background ==
Rowe was born in Lee Green, London, England. He is of Maltese, Dominican, and Jamaican descent.

== Career ==
He has previously played for the London Broncos, Castleford Tigers, Sheffield Eagles, Doncaster, and the Batley Bulldogs.

=== Hunslet RLFC ===
On 23 Jan 2020 it was announced that Rowe had joined Hunslet RLFC.
