= Andrew Webster (rugby league) =

Australian RL coach & footballer (born 1982)

Personal information
- Born: 17 January 1982 (age 44) Sydney, New South Wales, Australia
- Position: Five-eighth

Coaching information
Club
Years	Team	Gms	W	D	L	W%
2017	Wests Tigers	2	0	0	2	0
2022	Penrith Panthers	1	1	0	0	100
2023–	New Zealand Warriors	102	58	1	43	57
	Total	105	59	1	45	56
- Source: As of 11 September 2026
- Relatives: James Webster (brother)

Andrew Webster (born 17 January 1982) is an Australian professional rugby league football coach who is the head coach of the New Zealand Warriors in the National Rugby League (NRL).

Webster has been on the coaching staff at Hull Kingston Rovers in the Super League and the Warriors, Wests Tigers and the Penrith Panthers in the National Rugby League. He coached Wests and Penrith over a handful of first-grade games.

He is the younger brother of former Wakefield Trinity and Hull Kingston Rovers head coach James Webster.

== Playing career ==
Webster played his junior rugby league for Carlingford Cougars, the Dundas Shamrocks and Five Dock RSL before joining the Balmain Tigers in 1998, playing four seasons for their SG Ball and Jersey Flegg Cup teams. In 2002, he joined the Parramatta Eels, playing for their lower grades teams before joining the Ryde-Eastwood Hawks in the Jim Beam Cup in 2003. In 2004, he played a season with the Eastwood Rugby Club.

== Coaching career ==
In 2005, Webster joined American National Rugby League club, the Connecticut Wildcats as a player-coach. He led the team to the Grand Final, where they were defeated by the Aston Bulls.

In 2006, Webster joined Hull Kingston Rovers as an assistant and academy coach. In 2008, he returned to Australia, spending a season with the Parramatta Eels on work experience. He returned to Hull KR in 2009 as an assistant coach, spending three more years with the club.

In 2012, he once again returned to Australia, this time as head coach of the Balmain Tigers SG Ball Cup team and assistant to the Wests Tigers NYC team. That year, Balmain won the SG Ball Cup for the first time in 30 years and would go onto win the Under-18 National Final over the Townsville Stingers.

In 2013, Webster took over as head coach of the Parramatta Eels NYC team, winning just seven games. In 2014, he returned to the Wests Tigers as head coach of their NYC team, winning 16 games and reaching the finals.

In 2015, Webster joined the New Zealand Warriors as an assistant to then head coach Andrew McFadden.

=== Wests Tigers ===
After two seasons at the Warriors, Webster once again returned to the Wests Tigers in 2017 as an assistant coach.

On 22 March 2017, Webster was named interim head coach of the Tigers after former head coach Jason Taylor was sacked three games into the season. Ivan Cleary was announced as the new head coach on 3 April 2017.

=== Penrith Panthers ===
In 2020, Webster joined the Penrith Panthers as an assistant coach ahead of the 2021 NRL season, replacing Trent Barrett.

Webster would go on to win back-to-back Premierships with the Panthers in 2021 and 2022. During round 9 of the 2022 NRL season, Webster coached Penrith for one NRL game when head coach Ivan Cleary was absent, along with fellow assistant coach Cameron Ciraldo.

=== New Zealand Warriors ===
On 8 July 2022, the New Zealand Warriors announced that Webster had been appointed as their head coach, beginning with the 2023 season. Webster led to the Warriors to a top four finish, and the club's first home semifinal since 2007, during a highly successful first season in charge.

On 27 September 2023, Webster received the Dally M Coach of the Year award, after taking the New Zealand Warriors to a preliminary final from 15th on the ladder in 2022. However, the club could not back up a strong 2023 season with the club finishing 13th on the table at the conclusion of the 2024 NRL season. In the 2025 NRL season, Webster guided the New Zealand Warriors to a 6th placed finish on the table. They were eliminated in the first week of the finals by Penrith.

=== 2026 ===
On 20 August, the Warriors announced that they re-signed Webster until the end of 2032.
