= Joel Penny =

Australian rugby league footballer

Personal information
- Full name: Joel Penny
- Born: 22 January 1980 (age 46) Sydney, New South Wales, Australia

Playing information
- Position: Halfback
Club
Years	Team	Pld	T	G	FG	P
2000–01	Northern Eagles	6	1	0	0	4
2002	South Sydney	2	0	0	0	0
2006	Halifax	26	20	1	1	83
2007	Doncaster	8	4	0	1	17
2007	Widnes Vikings	15	10	0	1	40
	Total	57	35	1	3	144

Joel Penny (born 22 January 1980) is an Australian former professional rugby league footballer who played as a halfback.

== Playing career ==
Penny was a Kincumber Colts junior on the Central Coast. Penny made his first grade debut for the Northern Eagles joint venture, playing 6 NRL games. In 2002, Penny joined South Sydney and played 2 games for the club. In 2005, Penny moved to England and played for Whitehaven, where they lost in the grand final promotion match v Castledord. In 2006, Penny switched clubs to Halifax. Penny then moved from National League One rivals Doncaster Lakers after their financial troubles, Penny played for the Widnes Vikings in National League One. Penny was a revelation with Widnes, and in 2007 scoring six tries in just seven games.
