= Jordan James (rugby league) =

Wales international rugby league footballer

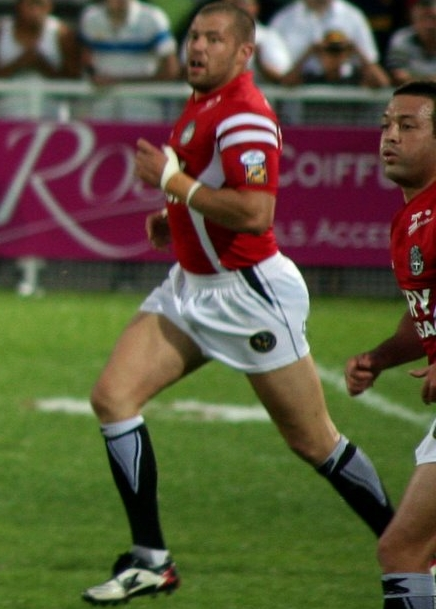

Personal information
- Born: 24 May 1980 (age 46) Bath, Somerset, England

Playing information
- Height: 6 ft 2 in (1.88 m)
- Weight: 16 st 1 lb (102 kg)
- Position: Prop, Second-row
Club
| Years | Team | Pld | T | G | FG | P |
|---|---|---|---|---|---|---|
| 2003–04 | Sheffield Eagles | 30 | 15 | 0 | 0 | 60 |
| 2005–06 | Castleford Tigers | 22 | 9 | 0 | 0 | 36 |
| 2006 | Wigan Warriors | 6 | 3 | 0 | 0 | 12 |
| 2006–07 | Widnes Vikings | 49 | 10 | 0 | 0 | 40 |
| 2008–11 | Crusaders RL | 80 | 16 | 0 | 0 | 64 |
| 2010(loan) | → South Wales Scorpions | 2 | 0 | 0 | 0 | 0 |
| 2010(loan) | → Widnes Vikings | 6 | 0 | 0 | 0 | 0 |
| 2012–13 | Salford City Reds | 44 | 6 | 0 | 0 | 24 |
| 2014 | Wigan Warriors | 17 | 2 | 0 | 0 | 8 |
| 2014(loan) | → Workington Town | 5 | 1 | 0 | 0 | 4 |
| 2015 | Swinton Lions | 23 | 2 | 0 | 0 | 8 |
| | Total | 284 | 64 | 0 | 0 | 256 |
Representative
| Years | Team | Pld | T | G | FG | P |
| 2003–13 | Wales | 30 | 9 | 0 | 0 | 36 |

Jordan James (born 24 May 1980) is a former Wales international rugby league footballer who played as a prop in the 2000s and 2010s.

He played for in the Super League for the Wigan Warriors, Crusaders RL along with the South Wales Scorpions, the Swinton Lions, the Widnes Vikings, the Castleford Tigers, the Sheffield Eagles and the Salford City Reds.

James is a former Royal Marine of 42 Commando who served with the marines in Iraq and was awarded the King's Badge during his Marines training and played his amateur rugby league with Gloucestershire Warriors.

After retiring from playing, James has gone on to have a successful career coaching and inspiring younger Wigan Warriors' players.

== Background ==
James was born in Bath, Avon, England.

== International honours ==
James has been captain numerous times for Wales while at Salford, Sheffield, Castleford, Widnes and Celtic Crusaders.

He was named in the Wales squad to face England at the Keepmoat Stadium, Doncaster prior to England's departure for the 2008 Rugby League World Cup.

He was named Wales' player of the year for 2009.

In 2010 he represented Wales again in the 2010 Alitalia European Cup.

He represented Wales in the 2011 Four Nations.

He represented Wales in the 2013 Rugby League World Cup.

== Personal life ==
He appeared in the fourth series of the ITV dating show Take Me Out, which aired on 1 December 2012. He got a date with Victoria after becoming the first person in the history of the show to still have all 30 lights left on in the final round.
