= 2007 National League Cup =

The 2007 National League Cup (known for commercial reasons as the Northern Rail Cup) was a British rugby league competition. The group stage of the competition began on 11 February and the final, in which Widnes Vikings won 54−6 against Whitehaven, was played on 15 July. In January 2007, the Rugby Football League announced a change to the points system meaning that teams earned three points for a win, two for a draw, and one bonus point for a loss by 12 points or less. However, in the final tables only one point was given for a draw.

== Results ==
=== Group stage ===
==== Group 1 ====
Pos	Team	Pld	W	D	L	BP	PF	PA	PD	Pts
1	Whitehaven	6	5	1	0	0	234	76	158	16
2	Barrow Raiders	6	3	1	2	2	210	108	102	12
3	Workington Town	6	3	0	3	0	136	210	−74	9
4	Blackpool Panthers	6	0	0	6	2	92	278	−186	2

==== Group 2 ====
Pos	Team	Pld	W	D	L	BP	PF	PA	PD	Pts
1	Castleford Tigers	6	6	0	0	0	246	58	188	18
2	Featherstone Rovers	6	2	1	3	1	130	164	−34	8
3	Sheffield Eagles	6	2	0	4	1	110	176	−66	7
4	Doncaster Lakers	6	1	1	4	2	86	174	−88	6

==== Group 3 ====
Pos	Team	Pld	W	D	L	BP	PF	PA	PD	Pts
1	Dewsbury Rams	6	5	0	1	1	228	64	164	16
2	Batley Bulldogs	6	2	0	4	2	100	137	−37	8
3	Hunslet Hawks	6	2	1	3	0	74	187	−113	7

==== Group 4 ====
Pos	Team	Pld	W	D	L	BP	PF	PA	PD	Pts
1	Widnes Vikings	6	5	0	1	0	256	70	186	15
2	Celtic Crusaders	6	4	0	2	0	136	156	−20	12
3	Leigh Centurions	6	3	0	3	2	192	120	72	11
4	London Skolars	6	0	0	6	0	72	310	−238	0

==== Group 5 ====
Pos	Team	Pld	W	D	L	BP	PF	PA	PD	Pts
1	Halifax	6	6	0	0	0	242	70	172	18
2	York City Knights	6	4	0	2	0	188	144	44	12
3	Keighley Cougars	6	2	0	4	1	136	184	−48	7
4	Gateshead Thunder	6	0	0	6	1	68	236	−168	1

==== Group 6 ====
Pos	Team	Pld	W	D	L	BP	PF	PA	PD	Pts
1	Rochdale Hornets	6	5	0	1	1	164	78	86	16
2	Swinton Lions	6	2	1	3	0	118	172	−54	7
3	Oldham	6	1	0	5	3	104	150	−46	6

==== Group 7 ====
Pos	Team	Pld	W	D	L	BP	PF	PA	PD	Pts
1	Bramley Buffaloes	6	6	0	0	0	204	94	110	18
2	Warington Wizards	6	2	0	4	2	170	158	12	8
3	Dewsbury Celtic	6	2	0	4	1	142	180	−38	7
4	Hemel Stags	6	2	0	4	0	106	190	−84	6

=== Knockout stage ===
Round of 16
Widnes Vikings	62
Batley Bulldogs	6
Rochdale Hornets	30
Swinton Lions	16
Castleford Tigers	50
Workington Town	24
Leigh Centurions	46
Dewsbury Rams	30
Whitehaven	52
Bramley	4
Barrow Raiders	18
York City Knights	16
Halifax	76
Featherstone Rovers	16
Celtic Crusaders	28
Hunslet Hawks	14

Quarter-finals
Widnes Vikings	24
Rochdale Hornets	0
Castleford Tigers	42
Leigh Centurions	6
Whitehaven	34
Barrow Raiders	14
Halifax	30
Celtic Crusaders	18

Semi-finals
Widnes Vikings	18
Castleford Tigers	12
Whitehaven	34
Halifax	19

Final
Widnes	54
Whitehaven	6

=== Final ===
The final was played at Bloomfield Road on 15 July 2007. The attendance was 8,326.

15 July 2007
2:15 pm BST

Widnes Vikings	54 – 6	Whitehaven
Tries: Grix, Blanch (2), Kohe-Love, Nanyn, Gaskell, Moran, Smith, Doran; Goals: Nanyn (9)	report scorers	Tries: Rudd; Goals: Rudd

Bloomfield Road
Attendance: 8,326
Player of the Match: Dennis Moran
