= Dennis Moran (rugby league) =

Australian rugby league footballer

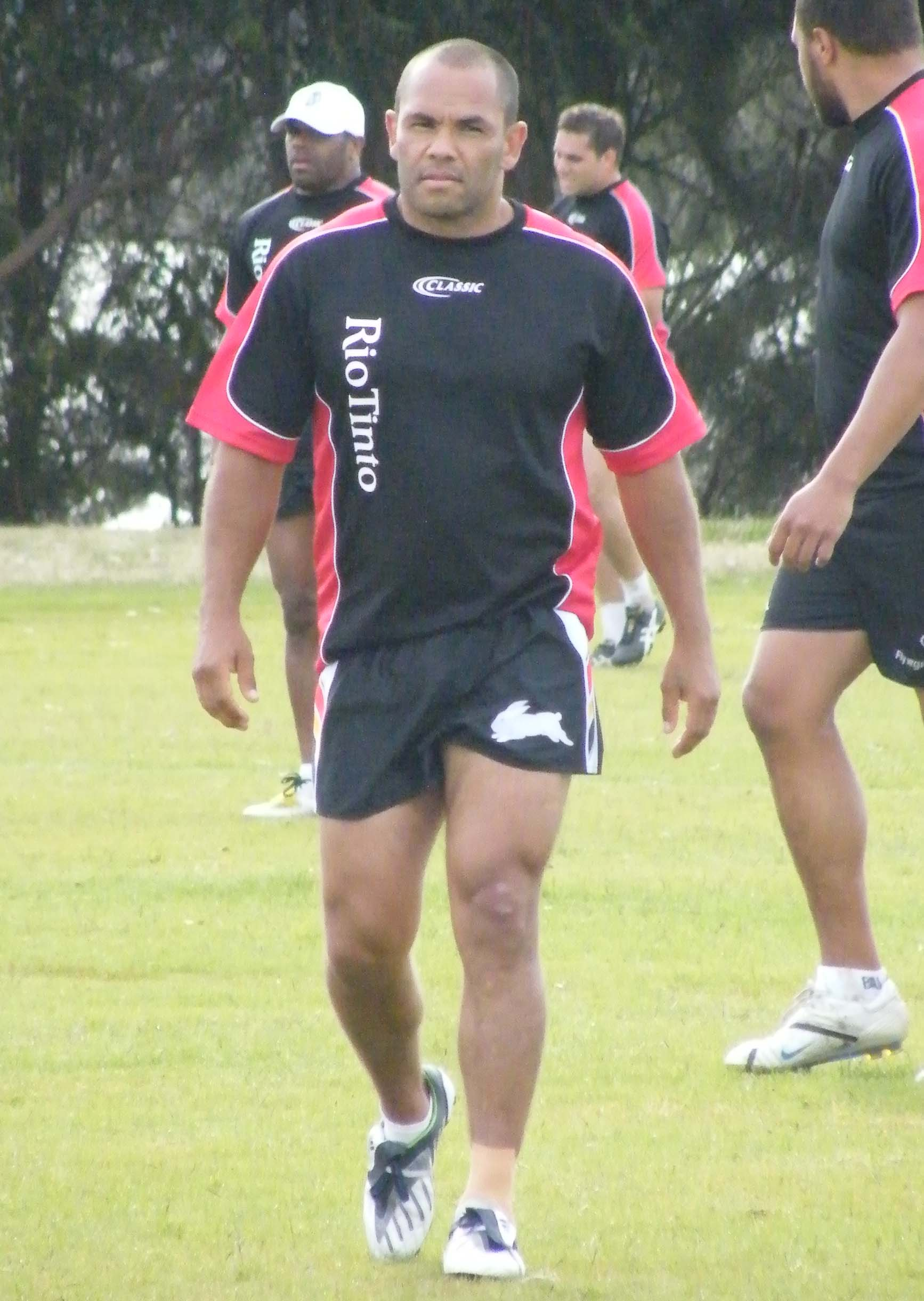

Personal information
- Born: 22 January 1977 (age 49) Armidale, New South Wales, Australia

Playing information
- Height: 173 cm (5 ft 8 in)
- Weight: 13 st 3 lb (84 kg)
- Position: Halfback, Five-eighth
Club
| Years | Team | Pld | T | G | FG | P |
|---|---|---|---|---|---|---|
| 1997–00 | Parramatta Eels | 36 | 8 | 0 | 0 | 32 |
| 2001–04 | London Broncos | 115 | 77 | 2 | 4 | 316 |
| 2005–06 | Wigan Warriors | 43 | 18 | 1 | 1 | 75 |
| 2006–07 | Widnes Vikings | 44 | 41 | 1 | 0 | 166 |
| 2008 | Leigh Centurions | 15 | 4 | 1 | 1 | 19 |
| | Total | 253 | 148 | 5 | 6 | 608 |

Dennis Moran (born 22 January 1977) is an Australian former professional rugby league footballer who played in the 1990s and 2000s. He played in the National Rugby League for the Parramatta Eels club and in the Super League for the London Broncos and the Wigan Warriors clubs, usually in the halves.

== Early life ==
While attending Duval High School, Moran played for the Australian Schoolboys team in 1995.

== Playing career ==
Moran made his National Rugby League début for the Parramatta Eels during the 1998 NRL season, eventually making 35 appearances for the club including the 18-16 1999 preliminary final defeat against Melbourne after Parramatta were winning 16-6 at halftime. In the first half of the match, Moran knocked the ball on over the try line after a pass from Nathan Cayless found him unmarked.

After that, Moran moved to England to play in the Super League for the London Broncos from 2001 to 2004.

Moran signed for Wigan Warriors on a two-year contract from London Broncos in November 2004. Moran replaced Wigan's Papua New Guinea player Adrian Lam, who had retired at the end of 2004's Super League IX. Moran had spent four seasons at the Broncos, making 113 appearances and scoring 75 tries. Moran topped the Super League try scoring tables in 2002 and 2003 and was the Broncos top scorer in 2004 with 19. Moran was released by Wigan Warriors on 25 May 2006 and was replaced by Michael Dobson. The following day he was signed by the Widnes Vikings in a bid to help them get their season back on track.

According to the Widnes World, Moran said "I've come here to try and help out as much as I can to get this club back into Super League." He earned a place in the 2006 National League One Dream Team. Moran was a revelation with Widnes in 2007 winning the National League One player of the year award.

Moran retired in 2008 whilst playing for the Leigh Centurions. Since then, Moran moved back to his native Australia and has taken up a coaching career.

== Coaching ==
Since retiring from playing Moran has followed many other former professional players into the coaching ranks. His current roles (2012) include being the head coach of the women's indigenous NRL All Stars team who play as a curtain raiser before the men's All Stars take to the field.
