= Paul Noone (rugby league) =

English rugby league footballer

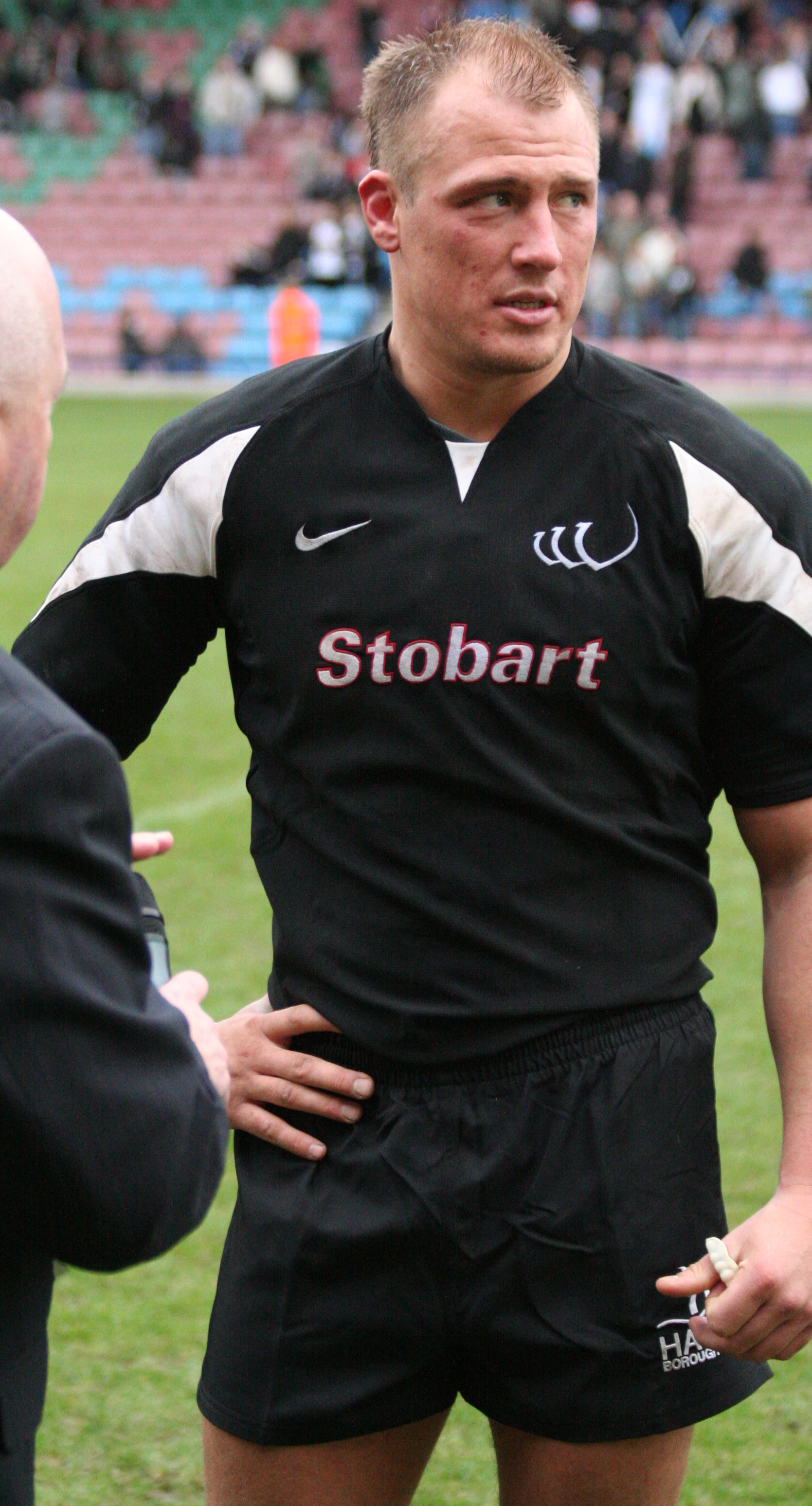

Personal information
- Full name: Paul Noone
- Born: 22 April 1981 (age 43); Widnes, Cheshire, England

Playing information
- Height: 6 ft 0 in (1.83 m)
- Weight: 15 st 4 lb (97 kg)
- Position: Second-row, Loose forward
Club
Years	Team	Pld	T	G	FG	P
2000–06	Warrington Wolves	66+62	14	26	0	108
2006	Harlequins RL	5+2	0	0	0	0
2007–08	Widnes Vikings	47	8	2	0	36
2009–10	Barrow Raiders	30+29	4	45	0	106
2011–12	Oldham	44+2	7	2	0	32
	Total	287	33	75	0	282

Paul Noone (born 22 April 1981) is an English former professional rugby league footballer who played as a goal-kicking second-row and loose forward in the 2000s and 2010s.

== Career ==
He played at club level in the Super League for the Warrington Wolves, and the Harlequins RL, and in the Co-operative Championship for the Widnes Vikings (where in 2007 he scored 5 tries in 22 games), the Barrow Raiders and Oldham. He has been noted for his ability to break a tackle, whilst his defence is also highly regarded.

== Personal life ==
Noone was born in Widnes, Cheshire.
