= Mick Nanyn =

Scotland international rugby league footballer

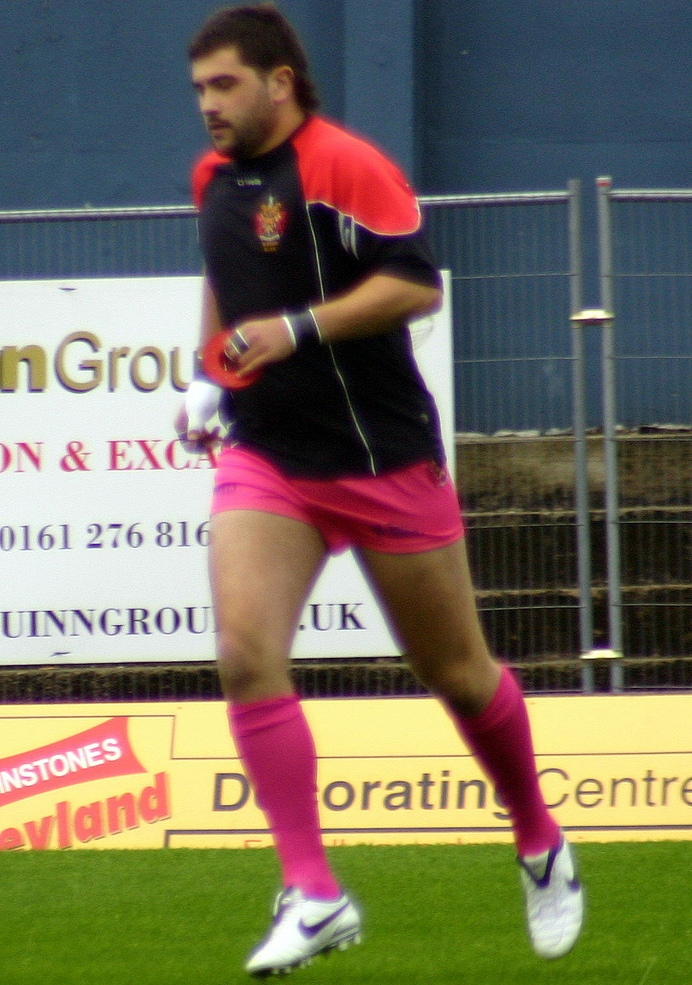

Personal information
- Full name: Michael Nanyn
- Born: 3 June 1982 (age 44) Wigan, Greater Manchester, England

Playing information
- Height: 6 ft 2 in (1.88 m)
- Weight: 17 st 4 lb (110 kg)
- Position: Centre
Club
Years	Team	Pld	T	G	FG	P
1999–02	Swinton Lions	82	40	152	0	464
2003	Rochdale Hornets	32	26	123	0	350
2004–05	Whitehaven	56	58	234	0	700
2006–07	Widnes Vikings	55	58	295	0	822
2008	Oldham	32	21	139	0	362
2009	Harlequins RL	0	0	0	0	0
2009–11	Leigh Centurions	66	54	258	0	732
2012	Halifax	0	0	0	0	0
2013–15	Swinton Lions	32	12	69	0	186
	Total	355	269	1270	0	3616
Representative
Years	Team	Pld	T	G	FG	P
2005–09	Scotland	10	6	24	0	72

Mick Nanyn (born 3 June 1982) is a former Scotland international rugby league footballer. He played as a centre and was a specialist goal-kicker. He set point scoring records at several of the clubs he played for. Nanyn started his career at Swinton, and went on to play for the Rochdale Hornets, Whitehaven, Widnes, Oldham and the Leigh Centurions. He also played for Scotland at international level.

== Background ==
Nanyn was born in Wigan, Greater Manchester, England.

== Club career ==
Nanyn had a reputation as a journeyman, playing for the Widnes Vikings, Whitehaven, the Rochdale Hornets and the Swinton Lions.

Starting out at Swinton Lions in 1999, Nanyn made his debut at the age of 16. Despite his age, Nanyn was a standout performer for the Lions during the more turbulent years of 1999-2003. Thus defining himself as both a try scorer and prolific goal kicker. Nanyn signed for the Widnes Vikings in 2006. In his first season at the club, he scored 388 points, breaking the record for most points scored in a single season, an accolade he took from Jonathan Davies. He beat his own record a year later, scoring 434 points in 2007.

In 2008 he beat Pat Rich's seven-year-old record at Oldham for points in a season (362, 139 goals, 21 tries).

He joined Super League side the Harlequins RL for the 2009 season. He only managed a couple of appearances in trial games for the Harlequins RL.

== Representative honours ==
In 2001, Nanyn represented the Northern Ford Premiership in an Under-21 trial game against the Super League, scoring a try in a surprise 27–20 win.

Nanyn was named in the Scotland training squad for the 2008 Rugby League World Cup.

Nanyn won ten caps for Scotland, including one appearance as a substitute. In 2009, he scored 40 points (two tries and 16 goals) in a 104–0 victory over Italy.

=== Career records ===
As of 2015, with 3714-points he is sixth on British rugby league's "most points in a career" record list behind Neil Fox, Jim Sullivan, Kevin Sinfield, Gus Risman and John Woods.

== Genealogical information ==
Mick Nanyn is the son of the rugby league second-row who played in the 1970s and 1980s for Wigan and Springfield Borough; Michael "Mick" Nanyn.

== Retirement ==
Nanyn announced his retirement from rugby league in May 2015, shortly before his 33rd birthday. In his announcement, he stated that the reason for his decision was that his "body couldn’t do what my head wanted it to".

Upon his retirement, Swinton Lions head coach John Duffy confirmed that the club had offered Nanyn a coaching role on their staff, citing his "outstanding knowledge of the game".
