= Lee Doran =

Ireland international rugby league footballer

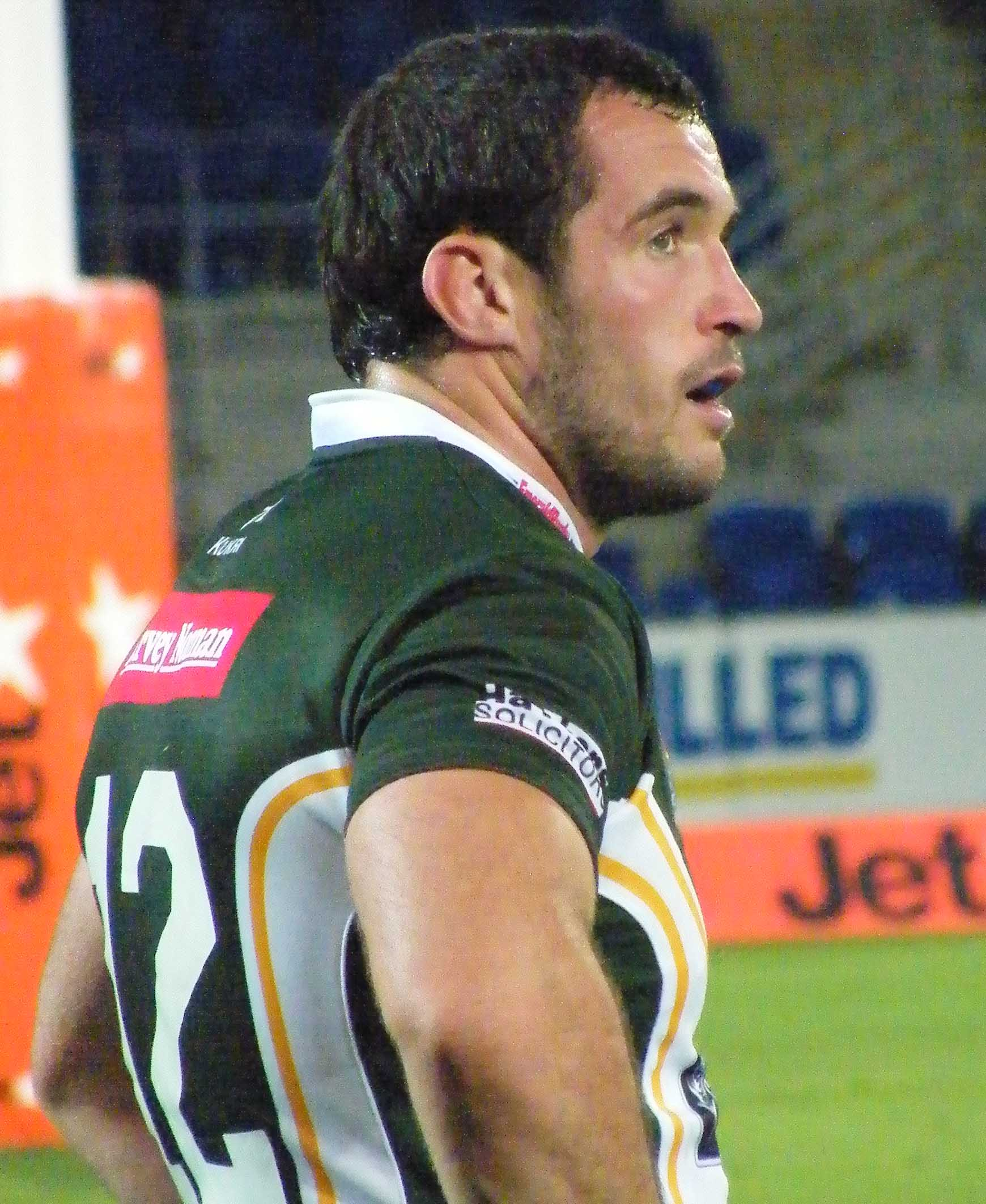

Personal information
- Full name: Lee Robert Doran
- Born: 23 December 1981 (age 43); Wigan, Greater Manchester, England

Playing information
- Height: 6 ft 0 in (1.83 m)
- Weight: 16 st 3 lb (103 kg)
- Position: Centre, Second-row, Loose forward
Club
Years	Team	Pld	T	G	FG	P
2000–04	Oldham	112	30	0	0	120
2005–06	Rochdale Hornets	53	10	0	0	40
2007	Widnes Vikings	32	5	0	0	20
2008	Leigh Centurions	27	10	0	0	40
2009–10	Widnes Vikings	58	13	0	0	52
2011–14	Whitehaven	100	18	0	0	72
	Total	382	86	0	0	344
Representative
Years	Team	Pld	T	G	FG	P
2003–07	Ireland	11		0	0

Lee Doran (born 23 December 1981) is a former Ireland international rugby league footballer who played in the 2000s and 2010s. He played at representative level for Ireland, and at club level for Oldham, the Rochdale Hornets, in National League One for the Widnes Vikings (two spells), for the Leigh Centurions and Whitehaven, as a centre, second-row or loose forward.

== Background ==
Lee Doran was born in Wigan, Greater Manchester, England, he has Irish ancestors, and eligible to play for Ireland due to the grandparent rule.

== Playing career ==
Lee Doran won the Rochdale Hornets’ 'Player of the Year' award in 2005, and was noted for his ability to break a tackle and his defence was also highly regarded, he scored two tries in 22 games for Widnes Vikings in 2007, he was named in the Ireland training squad for the 2008 Rugby League World Cup, and the Ireland squad for the 2008 Rugby League World Cup.
