= 2008 Widnes Vikings season =

- National League One Rank: 6th
- Play-off result: Elimination Play-Off
- Challenge Cup: Round Five
- National League Cup: Winners
- 2007 record: Wins: 10; draws: 2; losses: 6

Team information
- Coach: Steve McCormack
- Stadium: Halton Stadium
- Avg. attendance: 4,122 (Excluding Challenge Cup)
- High attendance: 8,129 (vs. Wigan Warriors, 19 June)
- Low attendance: 2,262 (vs. Sheffield Eagles, 6 April)
← 2007	List of seasons	2009 →

The Widnes Vikings rugby league club played in the 2008 season. This was their first season since being purchased by Cheshire millionaire Steve O'Connor after the club went into administration following their loss to Castleford Tigers in the 2007 National League One final.

== Championship Table ==
2008 National League One
#	Team	Pld	W	D	L	Bns	PD	Pts
1	Salford City Reds	18	12	3	3	3	312	45
2	Celtic Crusaders	18	12	0	6	4	120	40
3	Halifax RLFC	18	11	1	6	3	120	38
4	Leigh Centurions	18	10	0	8	4	0	34
5	Whitehaven	18	10	0	8	2	21	32
6	Widnes Vikings	18	10	2	6	5	43	30
7	Sheffield Eagles	18	8	1	9	3	−105	29
8	Featherstone Rovers	18	6	1	11	6	−63	26
9	Batley Bulldogs	18	5	0	13	8	−151	23
10	Dewsbury Rams(R)	18	2	0	16	7	−297	13

Classification: 1st on competition points; 2nd on match points difference.
Competition points: For win = 3; For draw = 2; For loss by 12 points or fewer = 1.

Notes: Widnes deducted 9 Points for going into administration

== League results ==
LEGEND
Win
Draw
Loss

Date	Competition	Vrs	H/A	Result	Score	Tries	Goals	Field goals	Att	Lineup	Subs
21/3/08	National League One	Batley Bulldogs	A	W	23-28	Yates (2), Hardman, Paterson, Grady	Hartley 4/5	N/A	1,091	Scott Yates, Dean Gaskell, Ian Hardman, Shane Grady, Gavin Dodd, Tim Hartley, John Duffy, Iain Morrison, Mark Smith, Jim Gannon, Danny Hill, Paul Noone, Bob Beswick	Lee Paterson, Tommy Gallagher, Dayne Donoghue, Rob Draper,
24/3/08	National League One	Leigh Centurions	H	W	30-12	Morrison, Hartley (2), Hardman	Hartley 7/7	N/A	4,722	Scott Yates, Dean Gaskell, Ian Hardman, Tim Hartley, Gavin Dodd, Lee Paterson, John Duffy, Iain Morrison, Mark Smith, Jim Gannon, Danny Hill, Paul Noone, Bob Beswick	Shane Grady, Tommy Gallagher, Dayne Donoghue, Rob Draper
30/3/08	National League One	Whitehaven R.L.F.C.	H	W	32-28	Hartley, Gaskell (4), Grady, Smith	Hartley 2/7	N/A	3,596	Scott Yates, Dean Gaskell, Ian Hardman, Tim Hartley, Gavin Dodd, Lee Paterson, John Duffy, Iain Morrison, Mark Smith, Jim Gannon, Danny Lima, Paul Noone, Bob Beswick	Shane Grady, Tommy Gallagher, Dayne Donoghue, Ben Kavanagh
11/4/08	National League One	Salford City Reds	A	D	16-16	Gannon, Hill, Dodd	Hartley 2/4	N/A	6,143	Scott Yates, Paddy Flynn, Ian Hardman, Tim Hartley, Gavin Dodd, Lee Paterson, John Duffy, Iain Morrison, Mark Smith, Jim Gannon, Danny Hill, Tommy Gallagher, Bob Beswick	Shane Grady (Not Used), Michael Ostick, Dayne Donoghue, Ben Kavanagh
27/4/08	National League One	Celtic Crusaders	H	L	14-16	Yates, Beswick, Paterson	Hartley 1/2, Dodd 0/1	N/A	4,201	Scott Yates, Dean Gaskell, Jason Crookes, Tim Hartley, Gavin Dodd, Lee Paterson, John Duffy, Iain Morrison, Mark Smith, Jim Gannon, Danny Hill, Tommy Gallagher, Bob Beswick	Shane Grady, Rob Draper, Dayne Donoghue, Richard Fletcher
6/5/08	National League One	Dewsbury Rams	A	W	22-29	Fletcher (2), Gannon, Barlow, Dodd	Dodd 4/5	Beswick	1,434	Ian Hardman, Dean Gaskell, Jason Crookes, Lee Paterson, Gavin Dodd, Bob Beswick, John Duffy, Iain Morrison, Mark Smith, Jim Gannon, Danny Hill, Richard Fletcher, Tommy Gallagher	Shane Grady, Sam Barlow, Rob Draper, Ben Kavanagh
18/5/08	National League One	Sheffield Eagles	H	W	30-22	Paterson, Hill (2), Gaskell, Gannon	Dodd 5/6	N/A	3,891	Ian Hardman, Dean Gaskell, Dayne Donoghue, Shane Grady, Gavin Dodd, Lee Paterson, John Duffy, Iain Morrison, Mark Smith, Jim Gannon, Danny Hill, Richard Fletcher, Bob Beswick	Adam Bowman, Sam Barlow, Rob Draper, Ben Kavanagh
31/5/08	National League One	Featherstone Rovers	A	L	34-22	Morrison, Yates, Hardman, Paterson, Hill	Dodd 0/3, Yates 1/2	N/A	1,910	Scott Yates, Dean Gaskell, Ian Hardman, Dayne Donoghue, Gavin Dodd, Lee Paterson, John Duffy, Iain Morrison, Mark Smith, Jim Gannon, Danny Hill, Paul Noone, Bob Beswick	Steve Roper, Adel Fellous, Rob Draper, Ben Kavanagh
8/6/08	National League One	Halifax R.L.F.C.	H	L	30-40	Hardman (2), Dean (2), Paterson	Fletcher 5/6	N/A	3,971	Scott Yates, Dean Gaskell, Ian Hardman, Chris Dean, Gavin Dodd, Lee Paterson, John Duffy, Iain Morrison, Mark Smith, Adel Fellous, Richard Fletcher, Paul Noone, Bob Beswick	Steve Roper, Jim Gannon, Danny Hill, Ben Kavanagh
19/6/08	National League One	Salford City Reds	H	W	20-18	Tyrer (2), Crookes	Fletcher 2/2, Tyrer 2/2	N/A	8,149	Ian Hardman, Dean Gaskell, Steve Tyrer, Chris Dean, Gavin Dodd, John Duffy, Matty Smith, Iain Morrison, Bob Beswick, Jim Gannon, Richard Fletcher, Paul Noone, Lee Paterson	Steve Roper, Adel Fellous, Jason Crookes, Ben Kavanagh
26/6/08	National League One	Celtic Crusaders	A	L	38-6	Gannon	Tyrer 1/1	N/A	3,595	Ian Hardman, Dean Gaskell, Steve Tyrer, Chris Dean, Gavin Dodd, John Duffy, Matty Smith, Iain Morrison, Bob Beswick, Jim Gannon, Richard Fletcher, Paul Noone, Lee Paterson	Steve Roper, Danny Hill, Jason Crookes, Ben Kavanagh
11/7/08	National League One	Batley Bulldogs	H	W	34-22	Duffy, Beswick, Paterson, Tyrer, Kavanagh, Dean	Tyrer 4/5, Fletcher 1/1	N/A	4,079	Ian Hardman, Dean Gaskell, Steve Tyrer, Chris Dean, Paddy Flynn, John Duffy, Matty Smith, Iain Morrison, Bob Beswick, Jim Gannon, Richard Fletcher, Ben Kavanagh, Lee Paterson	Steve Roper, Adel Fellous, Gavin Dodd, Paul Noone
20/7/08	National League One	Halifax R.L.F.C.	A	D	26-26	Flynn, Matty Smith, Strong, Noone	Tyrer 5/5	N/A	2,561	Ian Hardman, Dean Gaskell, Steve Tyrer, Chris Dean, Paddy Flynn, John Duffy, Matty Smith, Adel Fellous, Bob Beswick, Jim Gannon, Matt Strong, Paul Noone, Lee Paterson	Steve Roper, Iain Morrison, Gavin Dodd, Ben Kavanagh
27/7/08	National League One	Dewsbury Rams	H	W	40-0	Gaskell, Morrison, Fletcher, Tyrer, Flynn, Gannon, Dodd	Tyrer 6/7	N/A	4,082	Ian Hardman, Dean Gaskell, Steve Tyrer, Chris Dean, Paddy Flynn, John Duffy, Matty Smith, Iain Morrison, Bob Beswick, Jim Gannon, Matt Strong, Paul Noone, Lee Paterson	Gavin Dodd, Richard Fletcher, Gareth Morton, Michael Ostick
3/8/08	National League One	Leigh Centurions	A	L	33-24	Gaskell, Fletcher, Tyrer, Matty Smith	Tyrer 4/5	N/A	3,089	Ian Hardman, Dean Gaskell, Steve Tyrer, Chris Dean, Gavin Dodd, John Duffy, Matty Smith, Iain Morrison, Bob Beswick, Jim Gannon, Matt Strong, Paul Noone, Lee Paterson	Josh Simm, Richard Fletcher, Gareth Morton, Sam Barlow
10/8/08	National League One	Featherstone Rovers	H	W	30-20	Beswick, Hardman, Paterson, Matty Smith, Barlow	Tyrer 5/5	N/A	3,924	Ian Hardman, Dean Gaskell, Steve Tyrer, Gareth Morton, Gavin Dodd, John Duffy, Matty Smith, Iain Morrison, Bob Beswick, Jim Gannon, Matt Strong, Richard Fletcher, Lee Paterson	Mark Smith, Josh Simm, Dayne Donoghue, Sam Barlow
14/8/08	National League One	Sheffield Eagles	A	W	20-26	Mark Smith, Gaskell, Tyrer, Dean	Tyrer 5/5	N/A	1,823	Ian Hardman, Dean Gaskell, Steve Tyrer, Chris Dean, Gavin Dodd, John Duffy, Matty Smith, Iain Morrison, Mark Smith, Jim Gannon, Lee Paterson, Richard Fletcher, Bob Beswick	Tim Hartley, Sam Barlow, Gareth Morton, Michael Ostick
24/8/08	National League One	Whitehaven R.L.F.C.	A	L	20-16	Dodd, Gaskell, Morton	Tyrer 2/3	N/A	2,104	Ian Hardman, Dean Gaskell, Steve Tyrer, Chris Dean, Gavin Dodd, John Duffy, Matty Smith, Iain Morrison, Mark Smith, Jim Gannon, Lee Paterson, Richard Fletcher, Bob Beswick	Tim Hartley, Martin McLoughlin, Gareth Morton, Michael Ostick
4/9/08	National League One - Elimination play-offs	Halifax R.L.F.C.	A	L	32-16	Dodd (2), Tyrer	Tyrer 2/3	N/A	1,931	Ian Hardman, Dean Gaskell, Steve Tyrer, Tim Hartley, Gavin Dodd, John Duffy, Matty Smith, Iain Morrison, Mark Smith, Jim Gannon, Chris Dean, Richard Fletcher, Bob Beswick	Paul Noone, Martin McLoughlin, Gareth Morton, Adel Fellous

== Northern Rail Cup Results ==
Group 6
Team	Pld	W	D	L	BP	PD	Pts
Leigh Centurions	6	6	0	0	0	87	18
Widnes Vikings	6	3	0	3	3	135	12
Barrow Raiders	6	3	0	3	1	−62	10
Blackpool Panthers	6	0	0	6	1	−160	1

Date	Competition	Vrs	H/A	Result	Score	Tries	Goals	Field goals	Att	Lineup	Subs
3/2/08	2008 Northern Rail Cup - Group 6	Blackpool Panthers	A	W	4-38	Dodd, Gannon, Hill (2), Gaskell, Draper, Hartley	Hartley 5/7	N/A	905	Ian Hardman, Dean Gaskell, Shane Grady, Danny Speakman, Gavin Dodd, Tim Hartley, Steve Roper, Iain Morrison, Mark Smith, Jim Gannon, Danny Hill, Paul Noone, Bob Beswick	Adam Bowman, Tommy Gallagher, Rob Draper, Ben Kavanagh
10/2/08	2008 Northern Rail Cup - Group 6	Leigh Centurions	H	L	8-15	Grady	Hartley 2/3	N/A	4,032	Ian Hardman, Dean Gaskell, Shane Grady, Jason Crookes, Gavin Dodd, Tim Hartley, Steve Roper, Ben Kavanagh, Mark Smith, Jim Gannon, Danny Hill, Dayne Donoghue, Bob Beswick	Danny Speakman, Tommy Gallagher, Rob Draper, Michael Ostick
24/2/08	2008 Northern Rail Cup - Group 6	Leigh Centurions	A	L	20-10	Gaskell, Hill	Hartley 1/2	N/A	3,615	Ian Hardman, Dean Gaskell, Tim Hartley, Jason Crookes, Gavin Dodd, Lee Paterson, Steve Roper, Ben Kavanagh, Mark Smith, Jim Gannon, Danny Hill, Iain Morrison, Bob Beswick	Scott Yates, Tommy Gallagher, Dayne Donoghue, Paul Noone
27/2/08	2008 Northern Rail Cup - Group 6	Barrow Raiders	H	W	78-0	Hartley, Draper (3), Crookes (2), Gaskell, Hardman, Gallagher, Hill, Gannon, Beswick, Noone	Hartley 13/13	N/A	3,472	Ian Hardman, Dean Gaskell, Shane Grady, Jason Crookes, Gavin Dodd, Tim Hartley, Bob Beswick, Iain Morrison, Mark Smith, Jim Gannon, Dayne Donoghue, Rob Draper, Paul Noone	Lee Paterson, Tommy Gallagher, Danny Hill, Ben Kavanagh
2/3/08	2008 Northern Rail Cup - Group 6	Blackpool Panthers	H	W	60-12	Paterson (2), Grady, Hill, Dodd (2), Duffy (2), Crookes, Mark Smith, Yates	Hartley 3/3, Dodd 5/8	N/A	3,169	Scott Yates, Dean Gaskell, Shane Grady, Jason Crookes, Gavin Dodd, Tim Hartley, Bob Beswick, Ben Kavanagh, Mark Smith, Jim Gannon, Danny Hill, Paul Noone, Lee Paterson	John Duffy, Tommy Gallagher, Ian Hardman, Michael Ostick
16/3/08	2008 Northern Rail Cup - Group 6	Barrow Raiders	A	L	24-16	Hill, Flynn (2)	Hartley 2/3	N/A	1,413	Ian Hardman, Paddy Flynn, Adam Bowman, Jason Crookes, Gavin Dodd, Tim Hartley, Steve Roper, Ben Kavanagh, Bob Beswick, Danny Hill, Iain Morrison, Paul Noone	John Duffy, Tommy Gallagher, Rob Draper, Jim Gannon
6/4/08	2008 Northern Rail Cup - Quarter Final Qualifying Round	Sheffield Eagles	H	W	44-8	Hardman, Dodd (3), Paterson, Hartley, Hill	Hartley 8/11	N/A	2,262	Scott Yates, Dean Gaskell, Ian Hardman, Tim Hartley, Gavin Dodd, Lee Paterson, John Duffy, Iain Morrison, Mark Smith, Jim Gannon, Danny Hill, Rob Draper, Bob Beswick	Shane Grady, Tommy Gallagher, Steve Roper, Ben Kavanagh
24/5/08	2008 Northern Rail Cup - Quarter Final	Celtic Crusaders	A	L	50-18	Morrison, Gaskell, Roper	Dodd 3/4	N/A	1,750	Ian Hardman, Dean Gaskell, Lee Paterson, Shane Grady, Gavin Dodd, Bob Beswick, John Duffy, Ben Kavanagh, Mark Smith, Jim Gannon, Danny Hill, Iain Morrison, Richard Fletcher	Steve Roper, Sam Barlow, Dayne Donoghue, Rob Draper

== Challenge Cup Results ==
Date	Competition	Vrs	H/A	Result	Score	Tries	Goals	Field goals	Att	Lineup	Subs
9/3/08	2008 Challenge Cup - Round 3	Skirlaugh A.R.L.F.C.	H	W	60-18	Dodd (2), Duffy, Beswick, Gaskell (2), Paterson (3), Donoghue, Crookes	Dodd 8/11	N/A	4,510	Scott Yates, Dean Gaskell, Ian Hardman, Shane Grady, Gavin Dodd, Lee Paterson, John Duffy, Ben Kavanagh, Bob Beswick, Jim Gannon, Danny Hill, Rob Draper, Dayne Donoghue	Steve Roper, Iain Morrison, Jason Crookes, Michael Ostick
19/4/08	2008 Challenge Cup - Round 4	Doncaster R.L.F.C.	A	W	12-38	Gaskell (2), Hardman, Gallagher, Dodd, Yates, Donoghue	Hartley 5/7	N/A	1,541	Scott Yates, Dean Gaskell, Ian Hardman, Tim Hartley, Gavin Dodd, Lee Paterson, John Duffy, Iain Morrison, Mark Smith, Jim Gannon, Danny Hill, Tommy Gallagher, Bob Beswick	Steve Roper, Rob Draper, Dayne Donoghue, Ben Kavanagh
11/5/08	2008 Challenge Cup - Round 5	Hull F.C.	h	W	18-32	Beswick, Paterson, Draper	Dodd 3/3	N/A	4,102	Ian Hardman, Dean Gaskell, Jason Crookes, Shane Grady, Gavin Dodd, Lee Paterson, John Duffy, Iain Morrison, Mark Smith, Jim Gannon, Danny Hill, Dayne Donoghue, Bob Beswick	Scott Yates, Rob Draper, Adam Bowman, Ben Kavanagh

== Players ==
Player	D.O.B.	Appearances	Tries	Goals	F Goals	Points
Sam Barlow	7/3/88	6	2	0	0	8
Bob Beswick	8/12/84	30	6	0	1	25
Adam Bowman	12/11/87	4	0	0	0	0
Jason Crookes	21/4/90	11	5	0	0	20
Chris Dean	17/1/88	10	4	0	0	16
Gavin Dodd	28/2/82	30	15	28	0	116
Dayne Donoghue	22/9/88	15	2	0	0	8
Rob Draper	30/11/87	15	5	0	0	20
John Duffy	2/7/80	26	4	0	0	16
Adel Fellous	16/2/78	6	0	0	0	0
Richard Fletcher	17/5/81	14	4	8	0	32
Paddy Flynn	11/12/87	5	4	0	0	16
Tommy Gallagher	10/9/83	14	2	0	0	8
Jim Gannon	16/6/77	30	7	0	0	28
Dean Gaskell	12/4/83	28	17	0	0	68
Shane Grady	13/12/89	14	4	0	0	16
Ian Hardman	8/12/84	29	9	0	0	36
Tim Hartley	2/1/86	16	6	55	0	134
Danny Hill	31/10/84	21	11	0	0	44
Ben Kavanagh	4/3/88	21	1	0	0	4
Martin McLoughlin	2/8/80	2	0	0	0	0
Iain Morrison	6/5/83	28	4	0	0	16
Gareth Morton	21/10/82	6	1	0	0	4
Paul Noone	22/4/81	17	2	0	0	8
Michael Ostick	23/1/88	7	0	0	0	0
Lee Paterson	5/7/81	27	14	0	0	56
Steve Roper	10/11/86	14	1	0	0	4
Josh Simm	8/11/89	2	0	0	0	0
Mark Smith	18/8/81	22	3	0	0	12
Matty Smith	23/7/87	10	3	0	0	12
Danny Speakman	5/12/85	2	0	0	0	0
Matt Strong	17/2/87	4	1	0	0	4
Steve Tyrer	16/3/89	10	7	36	0	100
Scott Yates	8/9/88	13	6	1	0	26
