= 2010 Widnes Vikings season =

- Co-operative Championship Rank: 5th
- Play-off result: Elimination play-offs
- Challenge Cup: Fifth round (vs. Wigan Warriors)
- National League Cup: Quarter Finals to be played (vs. Barrow Raiders)
- 2010 record: Wins: 18; draws: 1; losses: 11

Team information
- Chairman: Steve O'Connor
- Head coach: Paul Cullen
- Captain: Mark Smith
- Stadium: Stobart Stadium Halton
- Avg. attendance: 2,858 (Excluding Challenge Cup)
- High attendance: 5,504 (vs. Wigan, 8 May)

Home colours	Away colours
← 2009	List of seasons	2011 →

The Widnes Vikings competed in the Co-operative Championship in 2010. Widnes were the defending 2010 National League Cup champions after they won the competition in 2009.

== Off Field Activity ==
=== 2010 Strip ===
The Widnes Vikings unveiled their new 2010 home shirt on Tuesday 1 December 2009 in front of 300 fans at the Stobart Stadium Halton.

Manufactured by Irish-based O'Neill's Sportswear, the shirt was specially designed with advances moisture control allowing the body to breathe easily with the garment feeling dry and cool to contribute to improved player performance.

The main shirt sponsor was the Stobart Group, and the word 'Stobart' was written across the front of the shirt. The strip also had four coloured lines (1 black, 2 red and another black line) stretching up the left hand side of the shirt; these four lines were similar to the three red lines the Stobart Group use on their haulage vehicles.

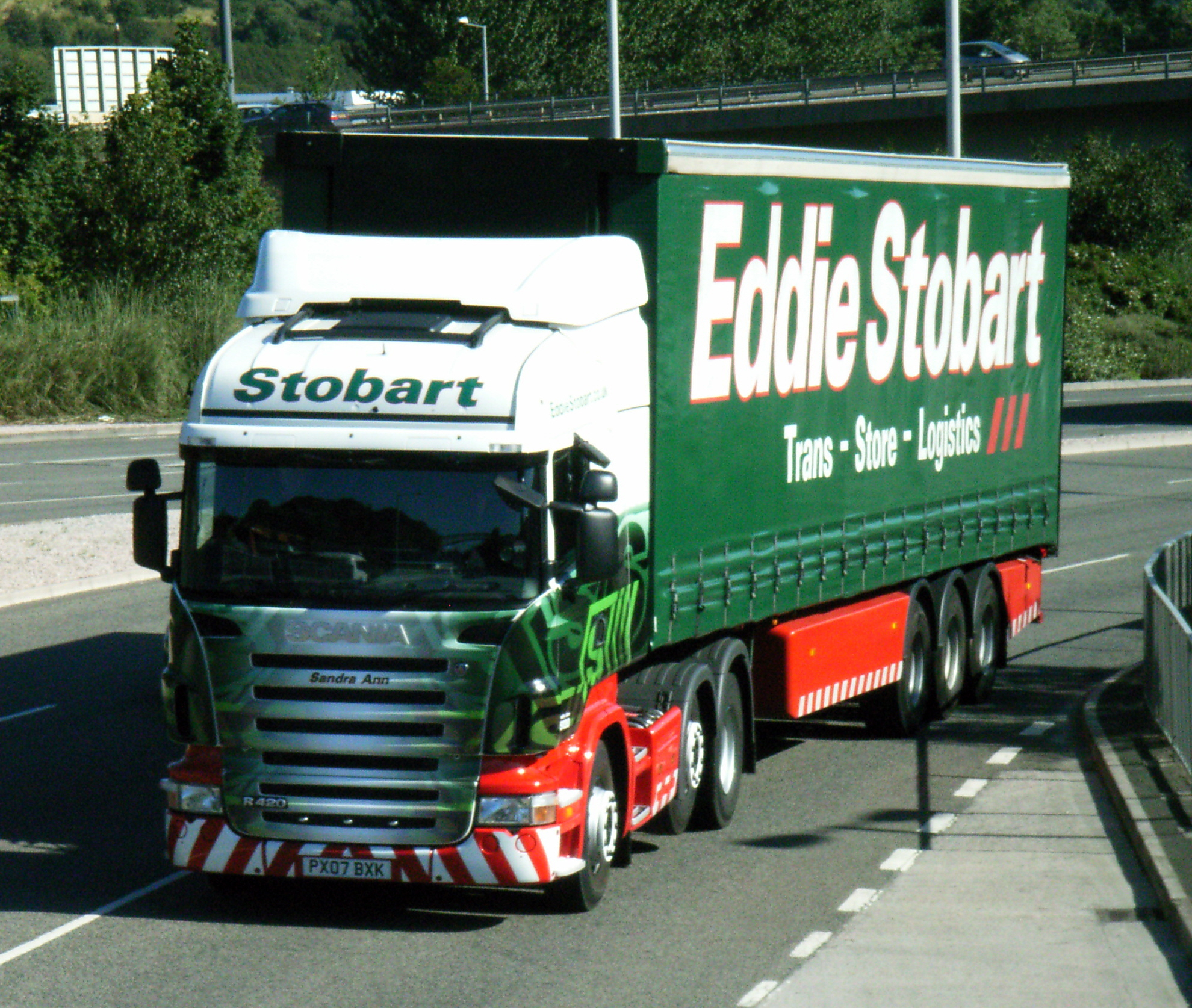
Eddie Stobart lorry. The Stobart Group were the main sponsors for the Vikingss in 2010.

The shirt also featured the RFL's 'Try Assist' logo, the new name for the RFL Benevolent Fund and a new sleeve sponsor for 2010 in Halton Housing Trust. The logo of Halton Borough Council was also displayed on the right hand side of the chest on the front of the shirt.

During the event the 2010 squad numbers were announced and fans were able to pre-order the new shirt which the Vikings will wear against Warrington Wolves in the World of Beds Cup on Boxing Day.

For the Gateshead Thunder game in 2009, chairman Steve O'Connor offered free admission for all Vikings fans. As season ticket holders did not benefit from this special offer (as they had already paid for the game when purchasing their season ticket), the club decided they would give vouchers to the 2009 season ticket holders who renewed their season tickets during an 'Early Bird' promotion. The vouchers were for fans to use on kit manufacturer O'Neills merchandise in the January sales.

Fans could claim discounts on Vikings items from the store, including the new 2010 strip. The discounts were: adult season ticket holders £10, concession season ticket holders £7 and junior season ticket holders £2. These discounts could only be applied when visiting the O'Neils store in Widnes town centre.

Vikings' CEO Alex Bonney explained the thinking behind the initiative: "Steve's offer in June came when things weren't going well on the pitch and the comeback against Gateshead, plus the atmosphere generated by our fans, set the team up for the victory over Halifax in the NRC semi-final and ultimately the final victory over Barrow to give us the ability to apply for a 2012 Super League licence. "While recognising that season ticket holders had already paid for this game as part of their 2009 ticket, we had planned to discount their 2010 season ticket but were heartened that a number of fans spoke to us to say that they understood the 'bigger picture' and were keen to back the club's initiative for that game without recompense. "With that in mind, and in conjunction with O'Neill's, the voucher scheme was established. "However, for those fans who do not wish to avail of this offer, we will class their voucher as a donation to the Valhalla Foundation, our award-winning charity.""

==== Special Edition Charity Kit ====
Paddy Flynn & Chris Gerrard modelling the Vikings special edition charity kit.

On Thursday 18 March Widnes wore a specially designed "one-off" charity kit during their Co-Operative Championship match, that was broadcast live on Sky Sports against Halifax to promote the Everyman Campaign, which raises awareness of testicular and prostate cancer in men.

The specially designed kit was manufactured by the Vikings current kit manufacturer O'Neils. The design of the kit was featured around a "nude" look, with the shirt made to look like a bare chested male torso, and the shorts made to look like males thighs, with a fig leaf covering the genital area.

Fans could purchase the special edition shirt from Wednesday 10 March. The shirt cost £40 and in aid of event O'Neil's donated £5 from every shirt sale to the Everyman charity. Fans were also able to make a donation online through a special page set up by the Vikings on the Justgiving website. Fans were also able to donate on the night at the Stobart Stadium Halton as volunteers were available within the stadium to collect donations.

To raise further funds for the charity, fans were able to purchase the match shirts worn by the players on the night through an auction run by the club. Fans were given until 5.00 pm on Monday 22 March to submit a bid to the club. Bids opened up at a minimum price of £50.00 and bids could be submitted by e-mail or by leaving a bid in a sealed envelope at the club reception.

Vikings chairman Steve O'Connor said: "Nearly everyone knows someone who has been affected by cancer. Unfortunately among men it is still a problem we don't like to talk about. We want to help raise awareness of the symptoms - and how to get help - and also help to raise money for such an important cause. We have chosen the Halifax game because we are expecting a big crowd so we can make a significant donation to Everyman".

Everyman spokesperson Tatjana Trposka said: "We are thrilled with the support we have received from Widnes Vikings. We desperately need to raise more awareness and funds to fight prostate and testicular cancers and we are another step closer thanks to the help of Widnes."

=== Transfers & Squad ===
It was all change for Widnes during pre-season with eight popular first team players leaving the Stobart Stadium Halton for pastures new. Gavin Dodd, John Duffy, Richard Fletcher, Tim Hartley, Michael Ostick and Brett Robinson all left in transfer deals, whilst Danny Mills and Lee Paterson were released.

Many of the moves were forced due to RFL reducing the salary cap. Previously the Championship's salary cap operated by limiting a club's player costs to no more than 50% of the club's income and is capped at a limit of £400,000. The new figures for 2010 will be reduced to 40% and £300,000, respectively.

Sporting Director Terry O'Connor said: "I know some of the players leaving would prefer to stay and we would like to keep them but with the reduction of the salary cap to £300,000, we have to spend accordingly".

==== Transfers in ====
Players In
Player	Signed from	Date signed	Contract length
James Ford	Castleford Tigers	1 September 2009	2 Years
Steve Pickersgill	Warrington Wolves	15 September 2009	3 Years
Thomas Coyle	Oldham R.L.F.C.	5 October 2009	
Gareth Haggerty	Harlequins	6 October 2009	1 Year
Chris Gerrard	Wigan Warriors	6 October 2009	2 Years

===== Loan/Dual Registration =====
Under new rulings Super League players are eligible for dual registration with a Championship club. The dual registration system is different to a loan agreement. Dual registered players can be called back at any time by their original club, when needed to play for them intermittently based upon form or injuries. When they are not needed by their original club they are eligible to play for their alternative dual registered club.

A player is only eligible for dual registration if they are outside the top 20 players (financially) of the Super League club's playing squad. Dual registered players are not allowed to feature in Challenge Cup games for their alternative club.

Loan players may go to Championship Clubs or to Super League clubs but must go for a minimum of 4 weeks.

Loan/Dual Registration
Player	Contracted Club	Contract Type	Contract length	Date signed
Chris Dean	St. Helens	Dual Registration	Full Season	December 2009
Shaun Ainscough	Wigan Warriors	Dual Registration	Full Season	February 2010
Liam Farrel	Wigan Warriors	Dual Registration	Full Season	February 2010
Ben Davies	Wigan Warriors	Loan	3 Months	February 2010

==== Transfers out ====
Players Out
Player	Transferred To	Date Left
John Duffy	Leigh Centurions	September 2009
Iain Morrison	Featherstone Rovers	October 2009
Gavin Dodd		October 2009
Richard Fletcher		October 2009
Tim Hartley		October 2009
Brett Robinson		October 2009
Danny Mills	Released	October 2009
Lee Paterson	Released	October 2009
Josh Simm	Released	October 2009
Michael Ostick	Rochdale Hornets	December 2009

=== Current squad ===
2010 Widnes Vikings season
First Team Squad		Coaching staff
1 James Ford – FB; 2 Dean Gaskell – WG; 3 Richard Varkulis – CE; 4 Toa Kohe-Love – CE; 5 Paddy Flynn – WG; 6 Anthony Thackeray – SO; 7 James Webster – SH; 8 Steve Pickersgill – PR; 9 Mark Smith (c) – HK; 10 Jim Gannon – PR; 11 Lee Doran – SR; 12 David Allen – SR; 13 Chris Gerrard – LF	14 Thomas Coyle – SH; 15 Shane Grady – CE; 16 Gareth Haggerty – PR; 17 Ben Kavanagh – PR; 18 Scott Yates – FB; 19 Mat Gardner – SR; 20 Chris Dean – SR; 21 Matt Strong – SR; 22 Dean Thompson – PR; 23 Dave Houghton – PR; 24 Danny Hulme – PR; 25 Anthony Mullally – PR	Head coach: Paul Cullen; Assistant coach: Stuart Wilkinson; Legend: (c) Captain(s); (vc) Vice-captain(s); Updated: 7 December 2009; Source(s): Widnes Vikings

== Preseason ==
Pre-season is a great time of year, everyone here is galvanised, enthusiastic and committed. Paul (Cullen) and Terry (O'Connor) have recruited well.

— Stuart Wilkinson

The international rugby league season took place between the 2009 and 2010 seasons, with the Four Nations being held in England and France. Vikings assistant coach Stuart Wilkinson assisted former Widnes star Bobbie Goulding by leading the French national team into the Four Nations, against England, Australia and New Zealand.

France's opening game was against England in the Keepmoat Stadium in Doncaster. Wilkinson and Goulding's French team started off strong taking a 12–4 lead at half time. England put in a strong second half performance scoring 30 unanswered point to win the game 34–12. Results didn't get much better for the French side as they were punished 62-12 by New Zealand in their second game of the competition and defeated 42-4 by Australia in their final game.

Despite losing all three games Wilkinson believes the experience will prove invaluable to him as a coach as he gained valuable insights on some new training and tactical ideas he plans to introduce to the training pitch at Widnes. He said: "It's great working with and against the game's elite and pitting your wits against the best players and coaches in the world. Since returning I've already discussed tactics with Paul at length and we'll see what we can do."

=== Fixtures and results ===
Legend
Game Won
Game Drawn
Game Lost
Game Abandoned

Round	Date	Kickoff (GMT)	Home/Away	Opponent	Result	Score	Venue	Attendance
1	26 Dec 2009	15:00	H	Warrington Wolves	A	A - A	Stobart Stadium Halton	-
2	10 Jan 2010	15:00	A	Blackpool Panthers	A	A - A	Woodlands Memorial Ground	-
3	19 Jan 2010	19:30	H	St. Helens	L	26 - 42	Stobart Stadium Halton	2,034
4	23 Jan 2010	15:00	A	AS Carcassonne	L	32 - 14	Stade d'Albert Domec	800
5	24 Jan 2010	15:00	H	Salford City Reds	L	0 - 36	Stobart Stadium Halton	1,780

==== Round 1: vs. Warrington ====
Round 1: 26 December 2009; Trial	Widnes Vikings	A–A	Warrington Wolves	Widnes, Cheshire
15:00 GMT				Stadium: Stobart Stadium Halton

Widnes Vikings open their pre-season schedule versus Super League neighbours and Warrington Wolves, in the World of Beds Cup on Boxing Day. This will also be the first time the fans get the chance to see some of the Vikings new signings.

It will be the first time former Wolves player Steve Pickersgill faces up against his old club after his transfer to the Vikings during the off season. Vikings Head Coach Paul Cullen also a former Warrington Wolves player stated that the tie is not about "me versus Warrington", it's about getting a good run-out for some of our players and raising some funds.

However, freezing weather conditions led to the game being cancelled as the surface was unplayable, and road conditions treacherous for fans. The game was rescheduled for Sunday, 3 January but again the severe weather conditions resulted in the game being cancelled a second time.

==== Round 2: vs. Blackpool ====
Round 2: 10 January 2010; Trial	Blackpool Panthers	A–A	Widnes Vikings	Blackpool, Lancashire
15:00 GMT				Stadium: Woodlands Memorial Ground

It's difficult to work on tactical and technical elements of training in these conditions but every other club is in the same boat, so we've been working hard in the gym.

— Stuart Wilkinson

Widnes Vikings assistant coach Stuart Wilkinson and conditioning coach Mick Cassidy continued their pre-season preparations by getting the Widnes side ready for a seaside clash with Blackpool Panthers in the absence of head coach Paul Cullen who was granted compassionate leave by the club whilst his wife is receiving treatment for cancer.

The snow and ice has meant the temporary duo of Wilkinson and Cassidy have had the unenviable task of finding alternative methods of preparing the squad for the Blackpool fixture. Wilkinson is happy to do all he can to help out during a difficult time for the club, he said: "I love the coaching work that I do and I have no aspiration to be a head coach, but it's a case of needs must at the moment. We're working in an unusual circumstances and Paul will be in and out. We're all supporting Paul in the best way we can and so myself and Mick Cassidy will ensure everything runs like he wants it to."

Despite all the effort put in on both sides to prepare for the fixture, the freezing weather conditions have again interrupted the Viking's pre season schedule. Due to snow and ice the pitch has been deemed unplayable and the Blackpool Panthers vs Widnes Vikings game was cancelled.

==== Round 3: vs. St Helens ====
Round 3: 26 December 2009; Trial	Widnes Vikings	26–42	St Helens	Widnes, Cheshire
15:00 GMT	Tries: Dean Thompson (26, 30); Anthony Thackeray (39); Matt Strong (42); Matt Gardner (60); Goals: Shane Grady x 3	1st: 18–26; 2nd: 8–16	Tries: Gary Wheeler (6, 44); Jamie Foster (12); Bryn Hargreaves (16); Sia Soliola (18); Tom Armstrong (36); Chris Dean (53); Jamie Ellis (79); Goals: Jamie Foster x5	Stadium: Stobart Stadium Halton; Attendance: 2,034; Referee: Ben Thaler (Field)

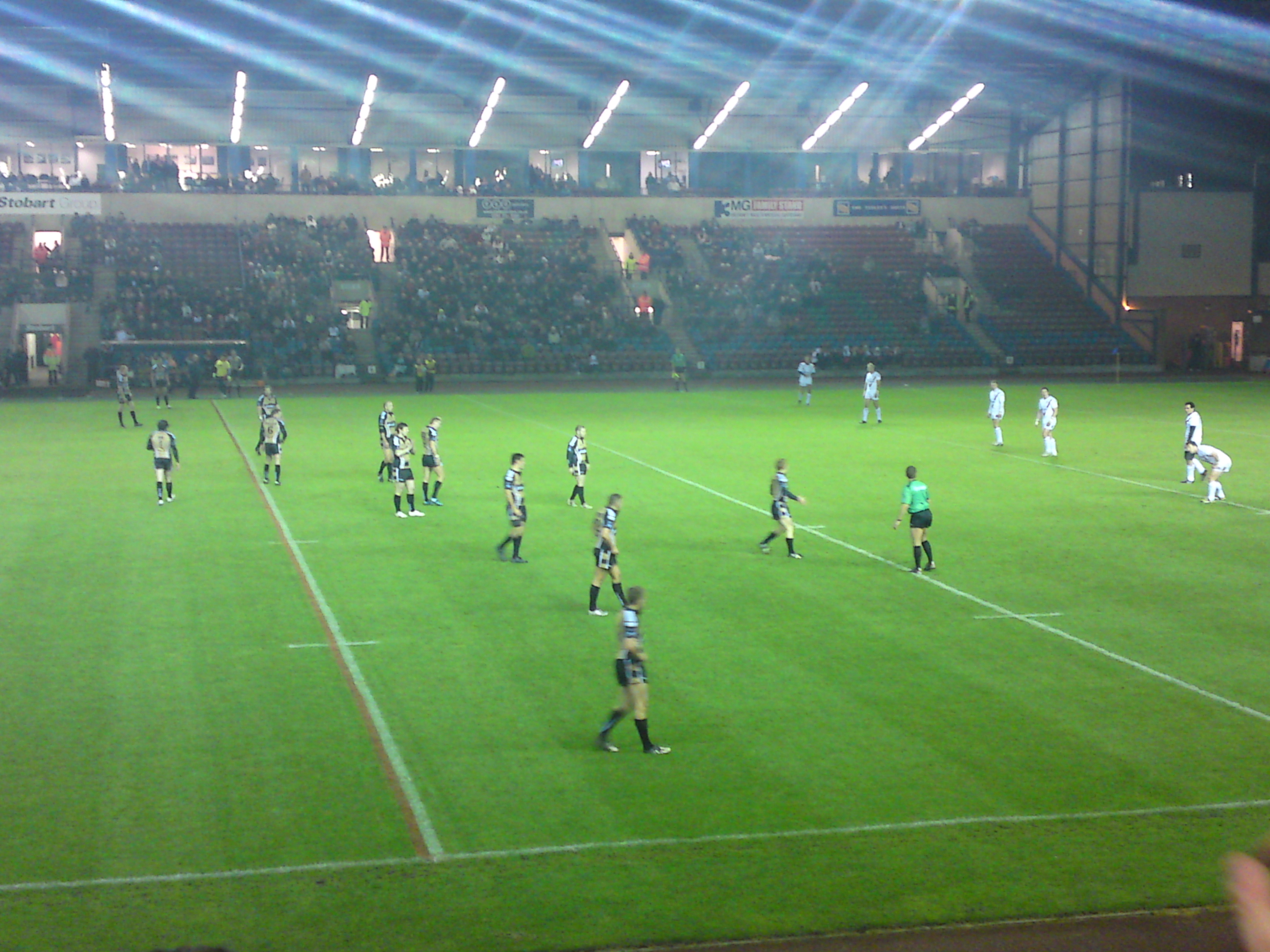
Widnes line up in their alternative strip against St Helens in the 2010 Karalius Cup.

2,034 fans braved the bitterly cold weather as the Widnes Vikings suffered a 42–26 defeat at the hands of Super League giants St. Helens in the Karalius Cup. This is the second time the sides have met in the Karalius Cup which was set up in honour of Vince Karalius who was a well decorated player for both Widnes and St Helens in the 1950s, and 1960s. Vince died from cancer in 2008.

This was the first run out the players had had in the 2010 campaign after the Vikings pre-season preparations were hampered by severe weather conditions, dubbed the Big Freeze by the media. Severe snowfall had resulted in unplayable conditions with caused both the Warrington Wolves and Blackpool Panthers games to be cancelled. For many of the Vikings players this was the first time they had played in months and was a chance to try to cement their place in the starting line up for the upcoming Co-operative Championship season.

Saint's arrived at the Stobart Stadium with plenty of players who are expecting to see first team action in this year's Super League campaign, with Saints imposing an early 22 point lead after four unanswered tries from Gary Wheeler, Jamie Foster, Sia Soliola and Bryn Hargreaves and 3 conversions from Jamie Foster.

Widnes who chose to wear their new 2010 away strip for the clash soon broke through the St Helens defence with two tries from Dean Thompson who was thrust into the starting line up after Toa Kohe-Love pulled a ham string during the pre-game warm up. Shane Grady followed up with successful conversions to add the extras to make it 22–12.

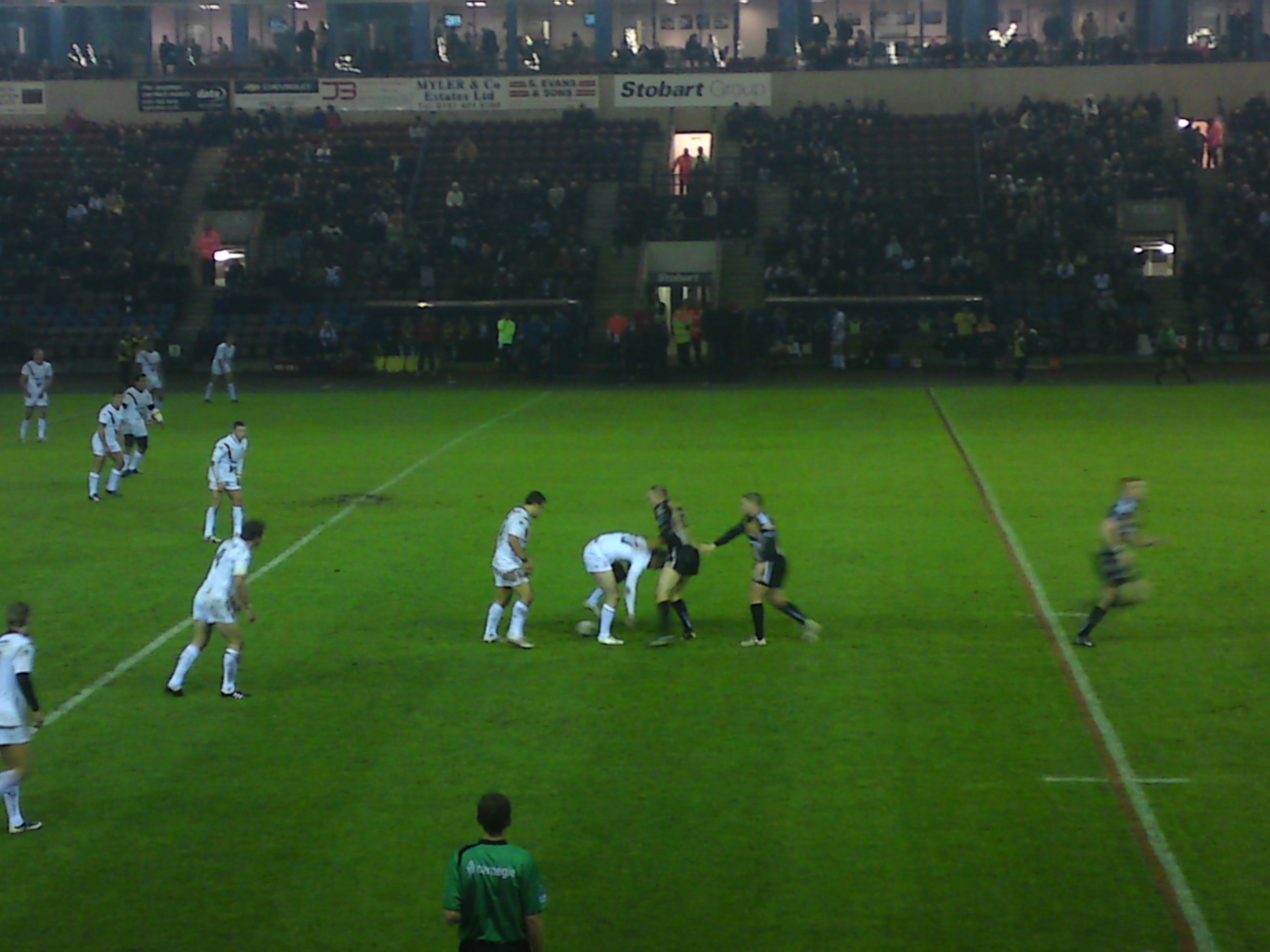
St Helens getting ready to play the ball during their clash with Widnes in the 2010 Karalius Cup.

Tom Armstrong increased the St Helens lead before a superb 80 metre inter-passing run between Anthony Thackeray and Danny Hulme with Thackeray going in for the points to score the final try of the half.

The Vikings were first off the mark in the second half with a try from Matt Strong who went in over the line from close range as he made the most of his opportunity following a fumble on possession from the Saints.

Saints followed up with tries from Gary Wheeler and dual registered Chris Dean.

The Saints lead was quickly closed as Matt Gardner went in for another Widnes try, but this was too little too late as the Saints held out a 10-point lead before Jamie Ellis finished off the Vikings with another St Helens try.

After the game Saints Head coach Mick Potter was full of admiration for the Vikings. He said: "I think Widnes have got some real players in there who can really make a impact on the Championship next season. From what I seen out there James Webster could still play Super League and with Mark Smith leading them around the park they have a leader. The forwards are pretty solid too, so I think Widnes look in decent shape ahead of the season."

Vikings Head coach Paul Cullen was also impressed with the Vikings performance. He said: "I was very happy with what I saw out there. The main thing was the players got some quality game time and got out on the pitch. The likes of Dean Thompson has come in for Toa Kohe-Love on the last minute and he has gone over for two tries and he took them well. Shane Grady has also done well."

==== Round 4: vs. Carcassonne ====
Round 4: 23 January 2010; Trial	Carcassonne	32–14	Widnes Vikings	Carcassonne, France
15:00 GMT		1st: 10–10; 2nd: 22–4		Stadium: Stade d'Albert Domec; Attendance: 800

To celebrate the 70th anniversary of the French club, Carcassonne and Widnes organised this pre-season friendly in France. The match against Carcassonne, the club with best historical record in France, was well attended with more than 800 spectators.

The Vikings had a pre-season friendly lined up against Salford City Reds the following day, taking this into account Widnes sent a combination of players from the academy and the reserve side with players ranging from sixteen to twenty one years of age.

This was the first time that the majority of the team had experienced open age rugby against a Carcassonne consisting of professionals. Two minutes in, Widnes lost full back Dave Kennedy, one of the more experienced players, through injury. Kennedy was replaced by Dave Dourley. After 8 minutes, a kick from Danny Craven was caught by Mark Briodie to score the opening try of the match, with Craven converting for the extra points.

The Carcassonne forwards were not making much progress but had a good kicking game. Widnes gave away a few penalties early on but were otherwise faultless in defence. A 40–20 by Dave Dourley set up a scrum out on the right and from the scrum good work by Gregg Scott and Tom Rigby sent Chris Moogan over after 23 mins.

The Vikings were penalised for a knock on shortly after the kick off and Carcassonne made the most of the opportunity and after good work from Andreas Bauer went over wide right on 27 mins. Substitutions were coming thick and fast and the French side's half backs came into fruition. A good handling move resulted in a try under the posts after 32 mins. Carcassonne converted making it 10 – 10 at the halftime interval.

The first set of the second half resulted in a try for Adam Lawton but the conversion was missed by Craven. Carcassonne began to make the most of their possession and on 47 mins juggled the ball over the line to score out wide on the left but failed to make the conversion.

The Vikings were penalised for another knock on, which gave Carcassonne the ball close to the Widnes line. Carcassonne again made the most of the opportunity and scored in the corner. This was followed up by a successful conversion to lead 20 - 14.

Widnes' lack of match fitness was beginning to show, the Vikings made a few breaks but could not capitalise. Carcassonne kept the ball alive on their possession and their prop crashed over for another try and kicked the conversion to take the lead 26 - 14.

Widnes had chances but were giving up possession too easily. The scoring was completed after 67 mins when another good passing move resulted in a Carcassonne try. The conversion was successful give Carcassonne a 32 - 14 lead which they held onto until the end of the match.

==== Round 5: vs. Salford ====
Round 5: 24 January 2010; Trial	Widnes Vikings	0–36	Salford City Reds	Widnes, Cheshire
15:00 GMT		1st: 0–16; 2nd: 0–20	Tries: Karl Fitzpatrick x2; Steve Tyrerx2; Ashley Gibson; Adam Sidlow; Luke Adamson; Jodie Broughton; Goals: Stefan Ratchford x2	Stadium: Stobart Stadium Halton; Referee: James Child (Field)

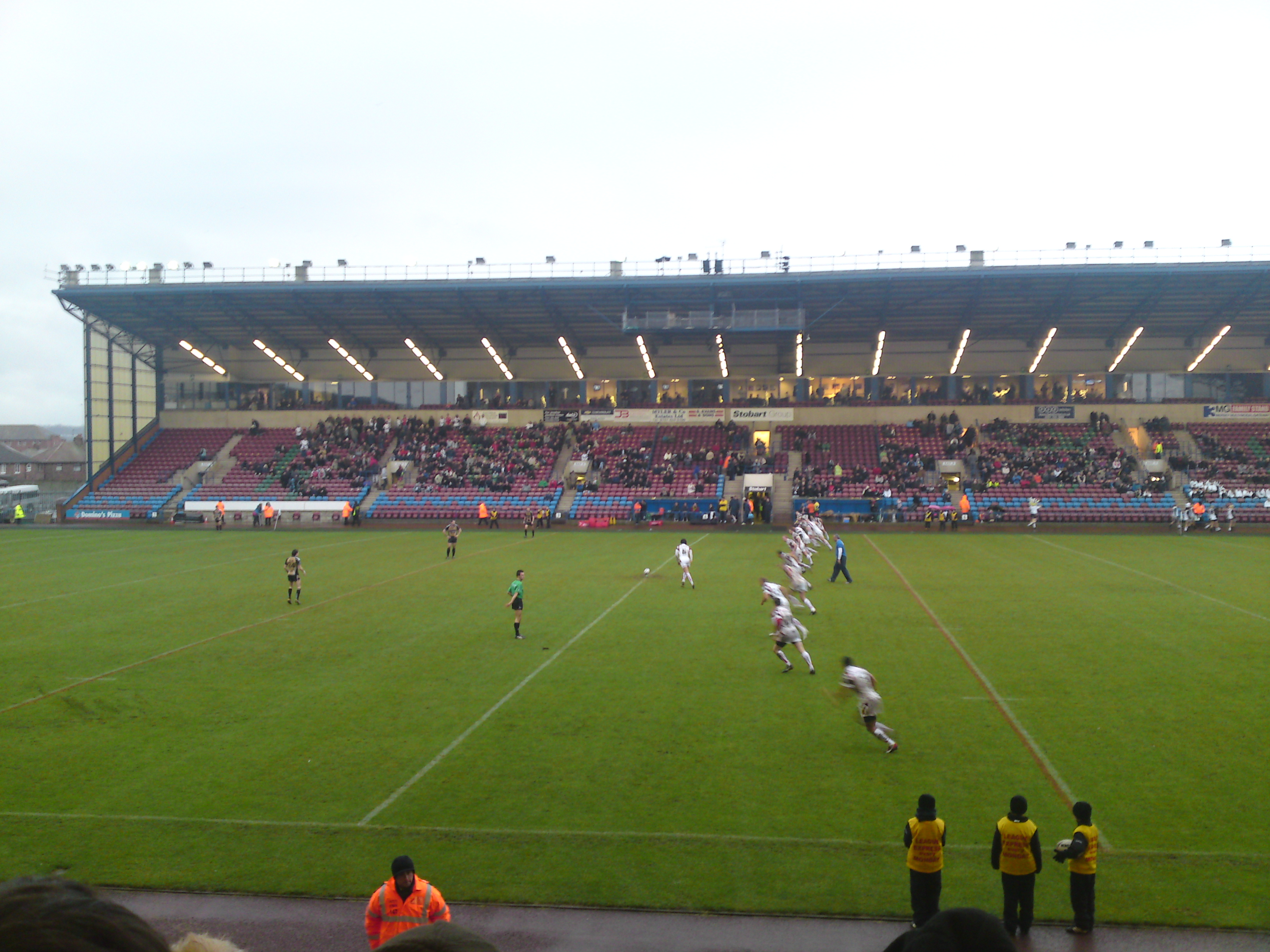
Widnes Vikings line up in their alternative strip for their home game against Salford City Reds, after Salford turned up in their white strip.

Widnes suffered another setback in the pre-season preparations after losing 36–0 to Salford City Reds at the Stobart Stadium Halton. Salford fielded their strongest possible side for the friendly match in preparation for the upcoming Super League season. Amongst the Salford line-up were three former Vikings players Karl Fitzpatrick, Stephen Tyrer and Adam Sidlow, who scored five tries between them.

This is the second time in a week that the Vikings have faced a Super League side after they were defeated last Tuesday (19 January 2010) by St. Helens. Widnes were missing seven senior first team players from the starting line-up, and the younger, inexperienced Vikings side could not cope with the pressure from the Super League side.

Widnes had a few moments early on but a tight Salford defence was able to shut them out. The game lacked any real excitement and was very much a stop start affair, with referee James Child taking centre stage after interrupting the game 27 times for penalties. The referee was also the centre of a controversial decision when he dismissed Tommy Coyle and Karl Fitzpatrick after Fitzpatrick struck Coyle after the hooker had delivered a loose high tackle which Widnes Head Coach Paul Cullen said wasn't a sending off offence. Fitzpatrick was then involved in a further incident when he threw his sports drink into a section of Widnes supporters before heading down the tunnel to the dressing room. As a result of the red card Fitzpatrick could miss the start of the Super League season through suspension.

Salford were very good and you have to take into account the opposition here and that they are in Super League

— Paul Cullen

Salford put points on the board early on after Fitzpatrick went over the line after only two minutes of play and again a few moments later for his second. Salford continued the scoring with tries from Steve Tyrer and Ashley Gibson. Salford took a sixteen-point lead into the break and added another twenty points in the second half with tries from Steve Tyrer, Adam Sidlow, Jodie Broughton and Luke Adamson. Stefan Ratchford added the extra points with two successful conversions.

Vikings head coach Paul Cullen can take some comfort from knowing his new-look squad won't face Super League opposition every week this season "We won't be playing that calibre of opposition every week." he said. "Today was all about using this match to try to toughen ourselves up and if that's all we've got out of it, so be it. Salford were very good and you have to take into account the opposition here and that they are in Super League. We had a number of key players missing, but it's a trial game and the real work starts next week."

Karl Fitzpatrick issued a public apology the following day to the Widnes supports for his conduct as he left the field after his red card. Fitzpatrick offered to personally meet and apologise to any Vikings supporters that were affected by his actions. Director of Football for Salford Steve Simms said: "Karl was shook up by our version of events and he has no recollection of any of it. The blow to the head has knocked the sense out of him. However, none of this condones what happened out there, for which Karl and the Club are deeply apologetic".

== Regular season ==
=== Fixtures and results ===
==== National League Cup ====
The Widnes Vikings are competing in National League Cup, known as the Northern Rail Cup for sponsorship reasons. This is a competition for clubs in the Co-operative Championship and Championship One. The exception to this is Toulouse Olympique, who do not participate in the cup at present.

Round	Opponent	Result	Score	H/A	Attendance	Date	Tries	Goals	Field Goals	Lineup	Subs	
NRC Pool One	Gateshead	50-6	Won	H	2,200	2 February	Thackeray (4), Ford (11,16,27,48), Pickersgill (19), Gardner (22), Dean (33,68), Grady (34), Allen (76)	Yates 1/5, Grady 2/6	N/A	James Ford, Scott Yates, Chris Dean, Shane Grady, Mat Gardner, Anthony Thackeray, James Webster, Steve Pickersgill, Mark Smith, Jim Gannon, Lee Doran, Dave Allen, Chris Gerrard	Thomas Coyle, Ben Kavanagh, Matt Strong, Dave Houghton	-
NRC Pool One	Batley	30-30	Drawn	A	1,004	7 February	Doran (12), Kavanagh (33,40), Ainscough (56,69), Thackeray (77)	Grady 3/6	N/A	James Ford, Shaun Ainscough, Toa Kohe-Love, Shane Grady, Mat Gardner, Anthony Thackeray (Sin Bin- 59th Minute- Punching), James Webster, Steve Pickersgill, Mark Smith, Jim Gannon, Lee Doran, Dave Allen, Chris Gerrard	Ben Kavanagh, Dave Houghton, Liam Farrell, Ben Davies	-
NRC Pool One	Barrow	22-20	Won	H	3,432	14 February	Farrell (21), Houghton (61), Coyle (77), Ainscough (80)	Grady 3/4	N/A	James Ford, Shaun Ainscough, Toa Kohe-Love, Shane Grady, Mat Gardner, Anthony Thackeray, James Webster, Gareth Haggerty, Mark Smith, Jim Gannon, Liam Farrell, Ben Kavanagh, Chris Gerrard	Thomas Coyle, Richard Varkulis, Matt Strong, Dave Houghton	-
NRC Pool One	Swinton	12-36	Won	A	816	21 February	Kohe-Love (7,52), Gardner (11), Grady (27), Ainscough (38), Mark Smith (54), Thackeray (75)	Grady 4/7	N/A	James Ford, Shaun Ainscough, Toa Kohe-Love, Shane Grady, Mat Gardner, Anthony Thackeray, James Webster, Gareth Haggerty, Mark Smith, Ben Kavanagh, Lee Doran, Liam Farrell, Dave Allen	Chris Gerrard, Thomas Coyle, Dave Houghton, Ben Davies	-
NRC Quarter Final	Barrow	26-12	Won	H	1,718	3 June	Grady (4), Netherton (12,76), Gaskell (26,40), Kohe-Love (51)	Grady 1/3, Chris Gerrard 0/2, Thackeray 0/1	N/A	James Ford, Dean Gaskell, Toa Kohe-Love, Mat Gardner, Paddy Flynn, Chaz I'Anson, Anthony Thackeray, Jim Gannon, Kirk Netherton, Ben Davies, Shane Grady, Dave Allen, Lee Doran	Chris Gerrard, Ben Kavanagh, Jordan James, Dave Houghton	-
NRC Semi-Final	Keighley	18-48	Won	A	1,686	20 June	Thackeray (21,35,51), Allen (40), Flynn (47), Ainscough (59), Mark Smith (63), Houghton (68)	Grady 8/8	N/A	Paddy Flynn, Shaun Ainscough, Toa Kohe-Love, Mat Gardner, Dean Gaskell, Anthony Thackeray, Mark Smith, Jim Gannon, Kirk Netherton, Ben Kavanagh, Shane Grady, Dave Allen, Lee Doran	Richard Varkulis, Chris Gerrard, Dave Houghton, Tom Kelly	-
NRC Final	Batley	25-24	Lost	N	8,138	18 July	Davies (14), Thackeray (17), Flynn (50), Chris Gerrard (65)	Grady 4/4	N/A	Paddy Flynn, Shaun Ainscough, Mat Gardner, Shane Grady, Dean Gaskell, Anthony Thackeray, Thomas Coyle, Gareth Haggerty, Kirk Netherton, Jim Gannon, Lee Doran, Dave Allen, Chris Gerrard	Steve Pickersgill, Mark Smith, Ben Kavanagh, Ben Davies	-

===== Pool 1 Qualification Table =====
2010 Northern Rail Cup: Pool 1
Pos	Team	Pld	W	D	L	PF	PA	PD	BP	Pts
1	Batley Bulldogs	4	3	1	0	210	70	+140	0	11
2	Widnes Vikings	4	3	1	0	138	68	+70	0	11
3	Barrow Raiders	4	3	0	1	176	48	+128	1	10
4	Keighley Cougars	4	3	0	1	144	110	+34	0	9
5	Blackpool Panthers	4	2	0	2	144	84	+60	1	7
6	Workington Town	4	2	0	2	76	83	−7	1	7
7	Whitehaven	4	1	0	3	110	83	+27	3	6
8	Swinton Lions	4	2	0	2	71	120	−49	0	6
9	Doncaster	4	0	0	4	50	184	−134	1	1
10	Gateshead Thunder	4	0	0	4	28	250	−222	0	0

Source: Northern Rail Cup Table – The RFL
Rules for classification: 1st on competition points; 2nd on match points difference. Competition Points: For win = 3; For draw = 2; For loss by 12 points or fewer = 1.

==== Challenge Cup ====
The 2010 Challenge Cup (officially known as the 2010 Carnegie Challenge Cup for sponsorship reasons) is a knockout rugby league tournament which began its preliminary stages in January.

The Challenge Cup is the most competitive European rugby league tournament at club level and is open to teams from England, Wales, Scotland, France and Russia.

The final of the Challenge Cup is one of the most prestigious matches in world rugby league, and is traditionally held at Wembley Stadium, London. Despite London not being an area traditionally associated with rugby league, the final receives a lot of mainstream media coverage and is broadcast to many different countries around the world.

Super League side Warrington Wolves are the reigning champions, following their 16–25 victory over Huddersfield Giants in the 2009 Challenge Cup Final at Wembley Stadium on 29 August 2009.

Widnes Vikings joined the 2010 Challenge Cup in the third round and were drawn against amateur side Wigan St Judes.

Round	Opponent	Result	Score	H/A	Attendance	Date	Tries	Goals	Field Goals	Lineup	Subs	
3	Wigan St Judes	Won	64-12	H	1,622	9 March	Allen (12,72), Thackeray (18), Doran (21), Yates (26), Houghton (31), Grady (41), Hulme (48,54), Varkulis (59,68)	Grady 8/12	N/A	Scott Yates, Paddy Flynn, Dean Thompson, Shane Grady, Mat Gardner, Anthony Thackeray, Thomas Coyle, Gareth Haggerty, Mark Smith, Lee Doran, Richard Varkulis, Matt Strong, Dave Allen	Ben Kavanagh, Chris Gerrard, Danny Hulme, Dave Houghton	-
4	Lézignan	Won	44-24	H	1,349	22 April	Coyle (3), Thackeray (21), Gardner (24), Chris Gerrard (26), Yates (32,37,77), Kavanagh (72)	Grady 6/8	N/A	James Ford, Paddy Flynn, Mat Gardner, Shane Grady, Scott Yates, Anthony Thackeray, James Webster, Ben Kavanagh, Thomas Coyle, Jim Gannon, Richard Varkulis, Lee Doran, Chris Gerrard	Danny Hulme, Dave Houghton, Jack Smith, Tom Kelly	-
5	Wigan	Lost	10-64	H	5,504	8 May	Gardner (48,68)	Grady 1/2	N/A	James Ford, Paddy Flynn, Toa Kohe-Love, Shane Grady, Mat Gardner, Chris Gerrard, James Webster, Dave Houghton, Anthony Thackeray, Matt Strong, Richard Varkulis, Lee Doran	Danny Hulme, Tom Kelly, Scott Yates, Alex Gerrard	-

==== Championship ====
The Widnes Vikings are competing in the 2010 Co-operative Championship. The Co-Operative Championship is a semi-professional rugby league football competition played in the United Kingdom and France, one tier below the first tier Super League.

The two worst performing teams during the season, with the exception of Toulouse Olympique, will be relegated to Championship 1. There is no automatic promotion from this league to Super League, which uses a licensing system which renewed every three years. Qualifying for the grand final is a prerequisite for Championship clubs to be able to apply for license in the next round of applications for the 2012–14 period.

The 2010 Co-Operative Championship season will consist of two stages. The regular season is played over 22 round-robin fixtures, in which each of the eleven teams involved in the competition will play each other once at home and once away. In the 2010 Co-Operative Championship, a win is worth three points in the table, a draw is worth one two points apiece, and a loss by 12 points or fewer is worth 1 bonus point.

The league leaders at the end of the regular season will receive the league leaders trophy, but the Championship is decided through the second stage of the season via a playoffs system. The top six teams in the table will contest to play in the grand final, the winners of which are crowned 2010 Co-Operative Champions.

Round	Opponent	Result	Score	H/A	Attendance	Date	Tries	Goals	Field Goals	Lineup	Subs	
1	Keighley	Won	72-10	H	2,777	28 February 2010	Grady (4,39,45), Gardner (9), Thompson (21,47,55), Allen (26), Farrell (30), Coyle (66), Varkulis (71), Thackeray (75), Yates (77)	Grady 10/13	N/A	Scott Yates, Richard Varkulis, Dean Thompson, Shane Grady, Mat Gardner, Anthony Thackeray, James Webster, Ben Kavanagh, Mark Smith, Jim Gannon, Liam Farrell, Lee Doran, Dave Houghton	Thomas Coyle, Chris Gerrard, Ben Davies, Dave Houghton	-
2	Sheffield	Won	30-44	A	1,085	14 March 2010	G. Haggerty (10), Gannon (21,59), Gardner (37,71), Thackeray (62), Webster (74)	Grady 8/8	N/A	Scott Yates, Paddy Flynn, Richard Varkulis, Shane Grady, Mat Gardner, Anthony Thackeray, James Webster, Gareth Haggerty, Mark Smith (Sin Bin- 67th Minute - Fighting), Jim Gannon, Liam Farrell, Lee Doran, Dave Allen	Thomas Coyle, Ben Kavanagh, Dave Houghton, Ben Davies	-
3	Halifax RLFC	Lost	28-30	H	3,286	18 March 2010	Coyle (3,52), Doran (39), Farrell (61), Varkulis (79)	Grady 4/6	N/A	Scott Yates, Paddy Flynn, Shane Grady, Richard Varkulis, Mat Gardner, Anthony Thackeray, James Webster, Gareth Haggerty, Mark Smith, Jim Gannon, Lee Doran, Liam Farrell, Dave Allen	Ben Kavanagh, Matt Strong, Ben Davies, Dave Houghton	-
4	Dewsbury	Won	30-36	A	1,499	28 March 2010	Thackeray (13,72,77), Webster (16), Grady (33), C. Gerrard (58)	Grady 6/7	N/A	Scott Yates, Paddy Flynn, Toa Kohe-Love, Shane Grady, Mat Gardner, Anthony Thackeray, James Webster, Ben Davies, Mark Smith, Jim Gannon, Lee Doran, Richard Varkulis, Chris Gerrard	Thomas Coyle, Ben Kavanagh, Matt Strong, Dave Houghton	-
6	Whitehaven	Won	48-18	H	3,033	5 April 2010	Thackeray (6), Ford (10), Doran (13), C. Gerrard (16), Kohe-Love (19), Gardner (23), Hulme (44), Grady (65), Flynn (71)	Grady 6/9	N/A	James Ford, Paddy Flynn, Toa Kohe-Love, Shane Grady, Mat Gardner, Chris Gerrard, Anthony Thackeray, Ben Davies, Mark Smith, Jim Gannon, Richard Varkulis, Matt Strong, Lee Doran	Ben Kavanagh, Scott Yates, Danny Hulme, Dean Thompson	-
7	Toulouse	Lost	38-42	H	2,793	10 April	Davies (8), Strong (17), Flynn (58), Thackeray (64,70,78), Coyle (76)	Grady 5/7	N/A	Scott Yates, Paddy Flynn, Toa Kohe-Love, Shane Grady, Mat Gardner, Chris Gerrard, Anthony Thackeray, Ben Davies, Mark Smith, Jim Gannon, Richard Varkulis, Matt Strong, Lee Doran	Ben Kavanagh, Jordan James, Thomas Coyle, Dave Houghton	-
8	Batley	Lost	24-32	A	1,146	25 April	Grady (3), Ford (5), C. Gerrard (8), Flynn (40,61)	Grady 6/7	N/A	James Ford, Paddy Flynn, Toa Kohe-Love, Mat Gardner, Scott Yates, Anthony Thackeray, James Webster, Jim Gannon, Chris Gerrard, Jordan James, Shane Grady, Ben Kavanagh, Lee Doran	Danny Hulme, Dave Houghton, Ben Davies, Tom Kelly	-
9	Featherstone	Lost	8-9	H	3,448	30 April	Gardner (44), Flynn (57)	Grady 0/2	N/A	James Ford, Shaun Ainscough, Toa Kohe-Love, Mat Gardner, Paddy Flynn, Anthony Thackeray, James Webster, Jordan James, Kirk Netherton, Jim Gannon, Lee Doran, Shane Grady, Chris Gerrard	Richard Varkulis, Dave Allen, Ben Kavanagh, Ben Davies	-
11	Leigh	Lost	30-16	A	3,392	13 May	Ainscough (36), Netherton (48), Flynn (54)	Grady 2/3	N/A	James Ford, Paddy Flynn, Toa Kohe-Love, Mat Gardner, Shaun Ainscough, Anthony Thackeray, James Webster, Jim Gannon, Kirk Netherton, Jordan James, Lee Doran, Shane Grady, Chris Gerrard	Dean Gaskell, Richard Varkulis, Ben Kavanagh, Ben Davies	-
12	Batley	Lost	16-35	H	2,780	22 May	Kavanagh (53), Thackeray (62,71)	Grady 2/3	N/A	Shane Grady, Dean Gaskell, Toa Kohe-Love, Mat Gardner, Paddy Flynn, Anthony Thackeray, Chris Gerrard, Jordan James, Kirk Netherton, Jim Gannon, Ben Kavanagh, Dave Allen, Lee Doran	Daniel Heckenberg, Dave Houghton, Richard Varkulis, Danny Hulme	-
14	Barrow	Lost	20-24	H	2,958	13 June	Varkulis (36,68), Gannon (60,78)	Grady 2/3	N/A	James Ford, Dean Gaskell, Richard Varkulis, Mat Gardner, Paddy Flynn, Anthony Thackeray, Mark Smith, Jim Gannon, Kirk Netherton, Ben Davies, Shane Grady, Ben Kavanagh, Lee Doran	Tom Kelly, Chris Lunt, Shaun Ainscough, Dave Houghton	-
15	Featherstone	Lost	30-22	A	1,776	27 June	C. Gerrard (41), Gardner (47), Allen (72), Ainscough (75)	Grady 3/4	N/A	Paddy Flynn, Shaun Ainscough, Richard Varkulis, Mat Gardner, Dean Gaskell, Anthony Thackeray, Mark Smith, Jim Gannon, Kirk Netherton, Ben Kavanagh, Shane Grady, Dave Allen, Lee Doran	Chris Gerrard, Dave Houghton, Tom Kelly, Kurt Haggerty	-
16	Whitehaven	Won	4-40	A	1,518	1 July	Allen (9,20), Grady (17,62), Netherton (43), Doran (49), Varkulis (66)	Grady 2/2	N/A	Paddy Flynn, Mat Gardner, Shane Grady, Kurt Haggerty, Richard Varkulis, Anthony Thackeray, Thomas Coyle, Daniel Heckenberg, Mark Smith, Jim Gannon, Lee Doran, Dave Allen, Chris Gerrard	Ben Kavanagh, Dave Houghton, Kirk Netherton, Danny Craven	-
17	Dewsbury	Won	27-26	H	2,715	11 July	Davies (10), Thackeray (43), C. Gerrard (52), Smith (64), Grady (79)	Grady 3/5	Coyle (60)	Paddy Flynn, Richard Varkulis, Mat Gardner, Shane Grady, Dean Gaskell, Anthony Thackeray, Thomas Coyle, Jim Gannon, Kirk Netherton, Ben Davies, Kurt Haggerty, Dave Allen, Lee Doran	Mark Smith, Chris Gerrard, Ben Kavanagh, Daniel Heckenberg	-
18	Leigh	Lost	18-38	H	3,356	25 July	Marsh (22), K. Haggerty (31), Ainscough (39)	Craven 3/3	N/A	Danny Craven, Shaun Ainscough, Kurt Haggerty, Stefan Marsh, Paddy Flynn, Anthony Thackeray, Thomas Coyle, Gareth Haggerty, Kirk Netherton, Jim Gannon, Lee Doran, Dave Allen, Chris Gerrard	Ben Davies, Steve Pickersgill, Mark Smith, Ben Kavanagh	-
30-16	Halifax	Lost	30-16	A	2,707	29 July	Kavanagh (13), Flynn (20), Gaskell (72)	Craven 2/3	N/A	Danny Craven, Dean Gaskell, Stefan Marsh, Mat Gardner, Paddy Flynn, Chris Gerrard, Thomas Coyle, Daniel Heckenberg, Mark Smith, Jim Gannon, Kurt Haggerty, Dave Allen, Ben Kavanagh	Steve Pickersgill, Dave Houghton, Tom Kelly, Kirk Netherton	-
20	Toulouse	Won	30-44	A	987	7 August	Craven (9), Mark Smith (12), Marsh (24,43), Flynn (29), Thackeray (38), Gaskell (40), Gardner (77)	Craven 6/8	N/A	Danny Craven, Dean Gaskell, Stefan Marsh, Mat Gardner, Paddy Flynn, Chris Gerrard, Anthony Thackeray, Daniel Heckenberg, Mark Smith, Jim Gannon, Lee Doran, Kurt Haggerty, Ben Kavanagh	Gareth Haggerty, Thomas Coyle, Shane Grady, Ben Davies	-
21	Sheffield	Won	30-10	H	2,659	12 August	Gaskell (11), C. Gerrard (21,77), Thackeray (43), Craven (66)	Craven 5/5	N/A	Danny Craven, Dean Gaskell, Richard Varkulis, Mat Gardner, Paddy Flynn, Chris Gerrard, Anthony Thackeray, Jim Gannon, Mark Smith, Daniel Heckenberg, Lee Doran, Kurt Haggerty, Ben Kavanagh	Thomas Coyle, Dave Houghton, Steve Pickersgill, Tom Kelly	-
10	Barrow	Won	14-32	A	1,796	18 August	Haggerty (18), Varkulis (22,24,51), Thackeray (47), Flynn (72)	Thackeray 1/3, Kurt Haggerty 2/3, Craven 1/1	N/A	Danny Craven, Paddy Flynn, Richard Varkulis, Mat Gardner, Dean Gaskell, Chris Gerrard, Anthony Thackeray, Daniel Heckenberg, Mark Smith, Jim Gannon, Lee Doran (Sin Bin- 6th Minute- Fighting), Kurt Haggerty, Ben Kavanagh	Thomas Coyle, Steve Pickersgill, Dave Houghton, Tom Kelly	-
22	Keighley	Won	24-32	A	1,173	22 August	Craven (31,54,57), Coyle (34), Brown (43), Pickersgill (60)	Craven 4/6	N/A	Danny Craven, Alex Brown, Richard Varkulis, Gregg Scott, Dean Gaskell, Chris Gerrard, Anthony Thackeray, Daniel Heckenberg, Kirk Netherton, Jim Gannon, Lee Doran, Tom Kelly, Ben Kavanagh	Thomas Coyle, Steve Pickersgill, Shane Grady, Alex Gerrard	-
Elimination play-offs	Barrow	Lost	38-0	A	2,434	5 September	N/A	N/A	N/A	Danny Craven, Paddy Flynn, Richard Varkulis, Mat Gardner, Scott Yates, Anthony Thackeray, Thomas Coyle, Steve Pickersgill, Mark Smith, Daniel Heckenberg, Lee Doran, Kurt Haggerty, Chris Gerrard	Kirk Netherton, Ben Kavanagh, Dave Houghton, Tom Kelly	-

===== Table =====
2010 Co-operative Championship
Pos	Team	Pld	W	D	L	PF	PA	PD	BP	Pts	Qualification or relegation
1	Featherstone Rovers	20	18	0	2	735	334	+401	2	56	Qualified for the Play-offs
2	Halifax	20	16	0	4	684	509	+175	2	50	Qualified for the Play-offs
3	Leigh Centurions	20	12	1	7	580	403	+177	5	43	Qualified for the Play-offs
4	Barrow Raiders	20	12	1	7	607	449	+158	1	39	Qualified for the Play-offs
5	Widnes Vikings	20	11	0	9	619	488	+131	5	38	Qualified for the Play-offs
6	Sheffield Eagles	20	10	1	9	503	555	−52	1	33	Qualified for the Play-offs
7	Batley Bulldogs	20	7	0	13	479	488	−9	8	29	
8	Toulouse Olympique	20	8	0	12	486	649	−163	3	27	
9	Dewsbury Rams	20	6	0	14	454	503	−49	8	26	
10	Whitehaven (R)	20	4	0	16	281	707	−426	4	16	Relegation position
11	Keighley Cougars (R)	20	4	1	15	362	703	−341	−4	10 (Note: Keighley had 5 bonus points, but started the season on −9 points for going into administration.)	Relegation position

Updated to match(es) played on 25 August 2010 (1:12pm). Source:
Rules for classification: 1st on competition points; 2nd on match points difference.
Competition points: For win = 3; For draw = 2; For loss by 12 points or fewer = 1.
(R) Relegated

== Squad statistics ==
Player	D.O.B.	Appearances	Tries	Goals	F Goals	Points
Alex Brown	28/4/93	1	1	0	0	4
Alex Gerrard	5/11/91	2	0	0	0	0
Anthony Thackeray	19/2/86	30	24	1	0	98
Ben Davies	2/11/89	17	3	0	0	12
Ben Kavanagh	4/3/88	31	5	0	0	20
Chaz I'Anson	30/11/86	1	0	0	0	0
Chris Dean	17/1/88	1	2	0	0	8
Chris Gerrard	1/10/89	28	9	0	0	36
Chris Lunt	18/12/90	1	0	0	0	0
Daniel Heckenberg	27/10/79	9	0	0	0	0
Danny Craven	21/11/91	8	5	23	0	0
Danny Hulme	15/2/91	6	3	0	0	12
Dave Allen	15/9/85	17	8	0	0	32
Dave Houghton	2/11/89	23	3	0	0	12
Dean Gaskell	12/4/83	13	5	0	0	20
Dean Thompson	22/11/88	3	3	0	0	12
Gareth Haggerty	8/9/81	8	1	0	0	4
Greg Scott	21/6/91	1	0	0	0	0
Jack Smith	16/12/91	1	0	0	0	0
James Ford	29/9/82	12	6	0	0	24
James Webster	11/7/79	13	2	0	0	8
Jim Gannon	16/6/77	27	4	0	0	16
Kirk Netherton	10/5/85	14	4	0	0	16
Kurt Haggerty	8/9/89	9	2	2	0	12
Lee Doran	23/3/81	29	5	0	0	20
Liam Farrell	23/3/81	6	3	0	0	12
Mark Smith	18/8/81	22	4	0	0	16
Mat Gardner	24/6/85	29	12	0	0	48
Matt Strong	17/2/87	8	1	0	0	4
Paddy Flynn	11/12/87	25	11	0	0	44
Richard Varkulis	21/5/82	22	10	0	0	40
Scott Yates	8/9/88	12	5	1	0	22
Shane Grady	13/12/89	26	13	101	0	254
Shaun Ainscough	27/11/89	10	8	0	0	32
Stefan Marsh	3/9/90	3	3	0	0	12
Steve Pickersgill	28/11/85	9	2	0	0	8
Thomas Coyle	10/5/88	20	8	0	1	33
Toa Kohe-Love	2/12/76	13	4	0	0	16
Tom Kelly	26/1/92	11	0	0	0	0
