= Martin McLaughlin =

Martin McLaughlin may refer to:

- Martin McLaughlin (academic), translator and professor of Italian
- Martin McLaughlin (politician), member of the Illinois House of Representatives

== See also ==
- Martin McLoughlin, Irish rugby league player
