= Chris Dean =

Chris Dean may refer to:

- Chris Dean (rugby league) (born 1988), English rugby league footballer
- Chris Dean (rugby union) (born 1994), Scottish rugby union player

== See also ==
- Christopher Dean, British ice dancer
