= Danny Hill (rugby league) =

English rugby league footballer

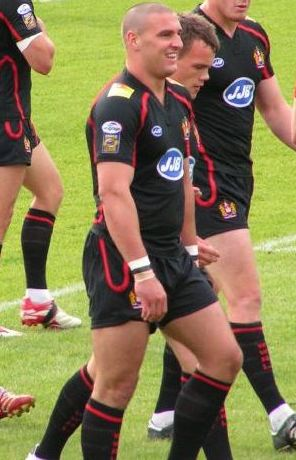

Personal information
- Full name: Daniel Hill
- Born: 31 October 1984 (age 40); Kingston upon Hull, Humberside, England

Playing information
- Height: 6 ft 0 in (1.83 m)
- Weight: 16 st 10 lb (106 kg)
- Position: Second-row, Prop
Club
Years	Team	Pld	T	G	FG	P
2004–06	Hull FC	11	0	0	0	0
2006–07	Wigan Warriors	12	0	0	0	0
2007(loan)	→ Hull Kingston Rovers	2	0	0	0	0
2008–09	Widnes Vikings	12	4	0	0	16
2010	York City Knights	8	2	0	0	8
	Total	45	6	0	0	24

Danny Hill (born 31 October 1984) is an English former professional rugby league footballer who played for the Widnes Vikings, Hull F.C. and the Wigan Warriors.

Hill started out his career at West Hull before joining up with Hull FC, and joining their scholarship scheme. He was in the England Schoolboys & Academy squad that toured Australia in the 2001 season. Hill made 11 appearances for Hull.

In May 2006, Hill signed a two-and-a-half-year deal with Wigan Warriors whose head coach, Brian Noble, described Hill as a 'quality young player'. Wigan were bottom of the Super League at the time, but went on to finish eighth and avoid relegation.

Hill went to Hull Kingston Rovers on 12 April 2007 on a month's loan.

Danny Hill failed to break into the Wigan Warriors first team during 2007 and on 28 November 2007 it was announced that he would be released from his contract so that he could get more first team experience and so that Wigan Warriors could afford another player under the salary cap. On 29 November 2007 Widnes Vikings announced they had signed Danny Hill along with Jim Gannon from Hull Kingston Rovers.
