= Stuart Wilkinson (rugby league) =

Former Wales RL coach & English former rugby league footballer

Personal information
- Full name: Stuart George Wilkinson
- Born: 8 February 1960 (age 65); Manchester, Lancashire, England
- Height: 5 ft 11 in (1.80 m)
- Weight: 14 st 0 lb (89 kg)

Playing information
- Position: Hooker, Stand-off
Club
Years	Team	Pld	T	G	FG	P
1979–98	Barrow	100
	Western Suburbs Magpies
	Total	100	0	0	0	0

Coaching information
Club
Years	Team	Gms	W	D	L	W%
1997–98	Barrow Raiders
Representative
Years	Team	Gms	W	D	L	W%
2004–04	Wales	2	0	0	2	0
2012	Russia	0	0	0	0
2019	Serbia	2	0	0	2	0
- As of 17 February 2021

Stuart George Wilkinson from Ulverston is an English professional rugby league football coach and former player from Barrow in Cumbria.

== Coaching career ==
He is the former Elite Coach Mentor for the French Rugby League and assistant coach for Widnes Vikings of the Co-operative Championship.

Wilkinson was previously assistant coach with Leeds Rhinos and Wigan Warriors but left the Super League team to join Widnes Vikings in 2008. Wilkinson was also assistant coach to the Leeds Rhinos side that won the World Club Championship in 2005.

=== International ===
He is also a double junior world champion as a Great Britain Academy Coach, beating Australia, New Zealand and France many times between 1998 and 2007. A full England Coach, British Lion assistant for the 2006 3 nations and Head Coach of the Wales National Team 2004.

==== Serbia ====
He is the head coach of the Serbia national team.

==== France ====
From 2008 to 2009 he worked for the French National side as an elite coach mentor helping France improve with the juniors beating Australia.
