= Ian Hardman =

English rugby league footballer & coach

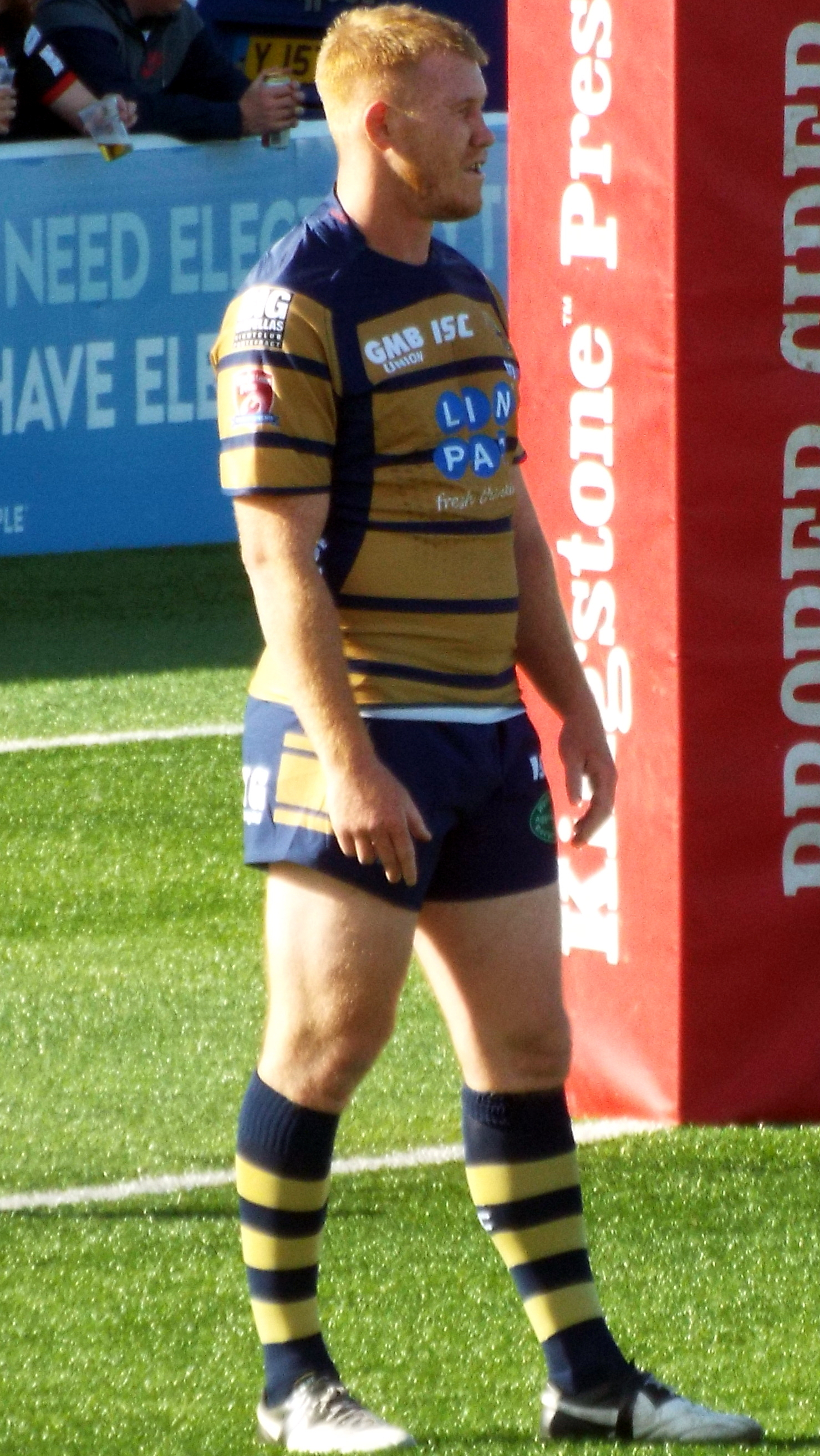

Personal information
- Born: 8 December 1985 (age 40) Whiston, Merseyside, England
- Height: 181 cm (5 ft 11 in)
- Weight: 95 kg (14 st 13 lb)

Playing information
- Position: Fullback, Wing, Centre
Club
Years	Team	Pld	T	G	FG	P
2003–08	St. Helens	47	11	8	0	60
2007(loan)	→ Hull Kingston Rovers	18	4	0	0	16
2008(loan)	→ Widnes Vikings	29	9	0	0	36
2009–18	Featherstone Rovers	288	131	151	1	827
	Total	382	155	159	1	939

Coaching information
Club
Years	Team	Gms	W	D	L	W%
2026	Keighley Cougars	25	6	2	17	24
- Source: As of 22 September 2026

Ian Hardman (born 8 December 1985) is an English professional rugby league coach who was head coach of Keighley Cougars in the Championship, and a former professional rugby league footballer who played for Featherstone Rovers, St Helens, Hull Kingston Rovers and Widnes Vikings.

== Background ==
Hardman was born in Whiston, Merseyside, England on 8 December 1985.

== Club career ==
Ian Hardman was a try scorer in the England Under-17s win over the Australian Institute of Sport side in December 2003. He made his début for St. Helens against Castleford on 15 August 2003 and made 46 appearances for St. Helens in total, scoring 15 tries, 11 goals and 8 drop goals. During the 2007 season, first-team chances at St. Helens were limited so Ian was loaned to Hull Kingston Rovers, he was instrumental in keeping them in Super League in their first season, making 18 consecutive appearances. He returned to St. Helens, only to be signed by Widnes on a season long loan.

=== Testimonial match ===
Ian Hardman's benefit season/testimonial match at Featherstone Rovers, allocated by the Rugby Football League, took place during the 2016 season.

== Coaching career ==
=== Featherstone Rovers ===
Hardman moved into coaching after retiring from playing and was assistant coach at Featherstone Rovers between 2021 and 2025.

=== Keighley Cougars ===
He moved to his first head coach role when he was appointed to that role at Keighley in February 2026.

On 2 September 2026 it was reported that he had left Keighley by mutual consent
