= Dayne Donoghue =

English rugby league footballer

Personal information
- Born: 22 September 1988 (age 36); Widnes, England

Playing information
- Position: Second-row, Loose forward
Club
Years	Team	Pld	T	G	FG	P
2006–08	Widnes Vikings	18	2	0	0	8
2009–13	Rochdale Hornets	84	14	0	0	56
	Total	102	16	0	0	64

Dayne Donoghue is an English former professional rugby league footballer who played in the 2000s and 2010s most notable for his time spent at the Widnes Vikings, and the Rochdale Hornets. He primarily played at second-row, and loose forward.
