= Shane Grady =

English rugby league footballer

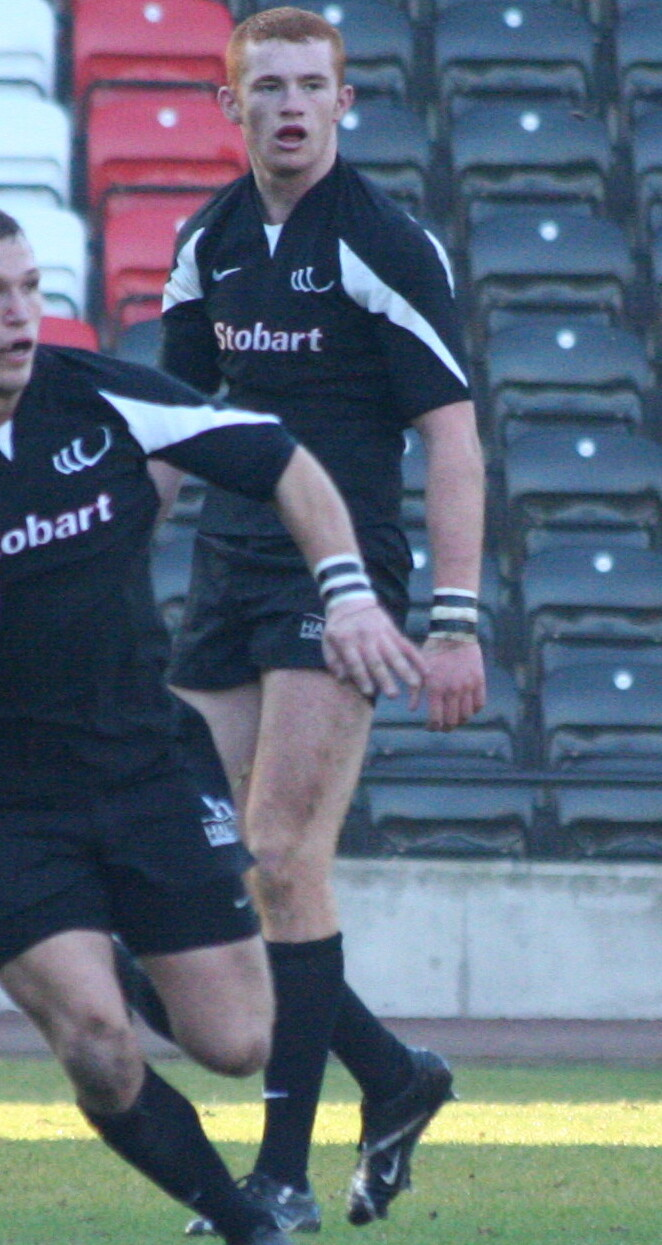

Personal information
- Born: 13 December 1989 (age 36) Widnes, Cheshire, England
- Height: 6 ft 4 in (1.93 m)
- Weight: 16 st 1 lb (102 kg)

Playing information
- Position: Second-row, Centre
Club
Years	Team	Pld	T	G	FG	P
2008–11	Widnes Vikings	75	24	103	0	302
2013	London Broncos	11	1	3	0	10
2013 DR	→ Hemel Stags	6	4	0	0	16
2014–16	Dewsbury Rams	40	21	1	0	86
2017–19	Halifax	47	11	7	0	58
2020–	Widnes Vikings	9	0	0	0	0
	Total	188	61	114	0	472
- Source: As of 1 January 2023

Shane Grady (born 13 December 1989) is an English rugby league footballer who plays as a second-row or centre for the Widnes Vikings in the Championship.

He played for the Widnes Vikings in 2008's National League One and the Championship. Grady also played for the London Broncos in the Super League, and on loan from the Broncos at the Hemel Stags in League 1. He also played for the Dewsbury Rams and Halifax in the Championship.

== Background ==
Grady was born in Widnes, Cheshire, England.

== Playing career ==
Grady is a Widnes lad, who came through the Chemics youth system and signed as a professional in 2008. Grady had an impressive début season in 2008, playing 14 games, and scoring 4 tries.

Originally signed from West Bank Bears as a fullback, he operated mainly in the centre and second row in the 2009 season where he played with squad number 23.

During the off-season Grady worked hard to improve the areas of his game that needed a little polish and his 2009 form was recognised with the award of squad number 15 for the 2010 season.

In January 2014, Grady was signed by Dewsbury.
