= Iain Morrison (rugby league) =

Scotland international rugby league & union footballer

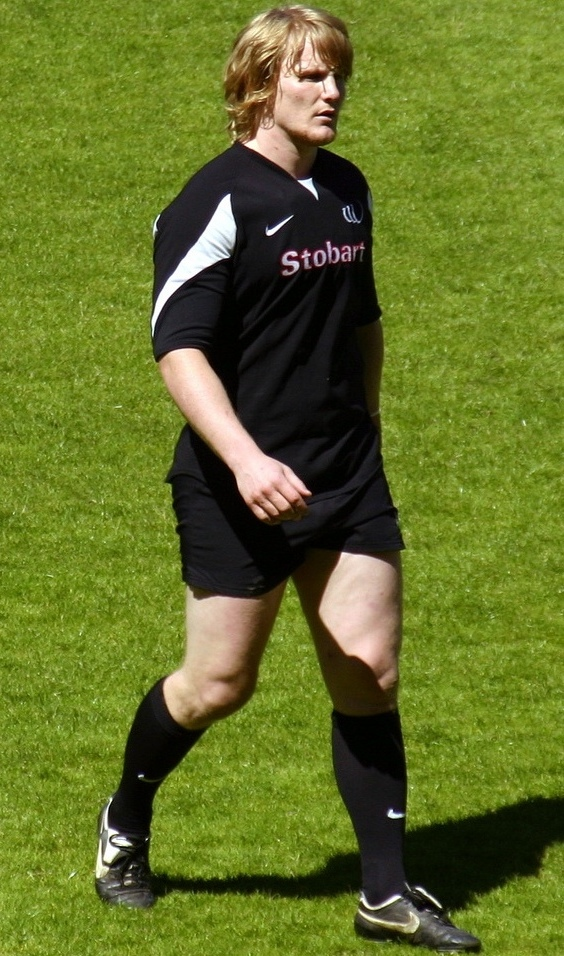

Personal information
- Full name: Iain Morrison
- Born: 6 May 1983 (age 43) Edgware, London, England

Playing information
- Height: 6 ft 0 in (1.83 m)
- Weight: 15 st 4 lb (97 kg)

Rugby league
- Position: Prop, Second-row
Club
| Years | Team | Pld | T | G | FG | P |
|---|---|---|---|---|---|---|
| 2001 | London Broncos | 1 | 0 | 0 | 0 | 0 |
| 2003–05 | Huddersfield Giants | 46 | 0 | 0 | 0 | 0 |
| 2005 | Whitehaven | 3 | 0 | 0 | 0 | 0 |
| 2006–07 | Hull Kingston Rovers | 39 | 5 | 0 | 0 | 20 |
| 2008–09 | Widnes Vikings | 39 | 9 | 0 | 0 | 36 |
| 2010–11 | Featherstone Rovers | 27 | 3 | 0 | 0 | 12 |
| 2012 | Halifax | 4 | 0 | 0 | 0 | 0 |
| 2013 | Oxford | 2 | 0 | 0 | 0 | 0 |
| 2014 | York City Knights | 4 | 0 | 0 | 0 | 0 |
| | Total | 165 | 17 | 0 | 0 | 68 |
Representative
| Years | Team | Pld | T | G | FG | P |
| 2003–09 | Scotland | 9 | 0 | 0 | 0 | 0 |

Rugby union
Club
| Years | Team | Pld | T | G | FG | P |
|---|---|---|---|---|---|---|
| | Harlequins | 2 |
| | Gloucester | 5 |
| | Total | 7 | 0 | 0 | 0 | 0 |

Iain Morrison (born 6 May 1983), also known by the nickname of "Drago", is a former Scotland international rugby league footballer who last played for Featherstone Rovers after signing in October 2009. He signed for Hull Kingston Rovers from Huddersfield after he had initially come through London Broncos academy.

== Background ==
Morrison was born in Edgware, London, England.

== Playing career ==
Although he was born in London, Morrison has represented Scotland on several occasions due to his heritage.

He was released from Hull Kingston Rovers on 17 September 2007, and on 21 September 2007 signed for Widnes.

He was named in the Scotland training squad for the 2008 Rugby League World Cup.

He was named in the Scotland squad for the 2008 Rugby League World Cup. After the World Cup Morrison was named Scottish player of the year for 2008. He was named Scottish player of the year for 2009.
