= Tim Hartley =

English rugby league footballer

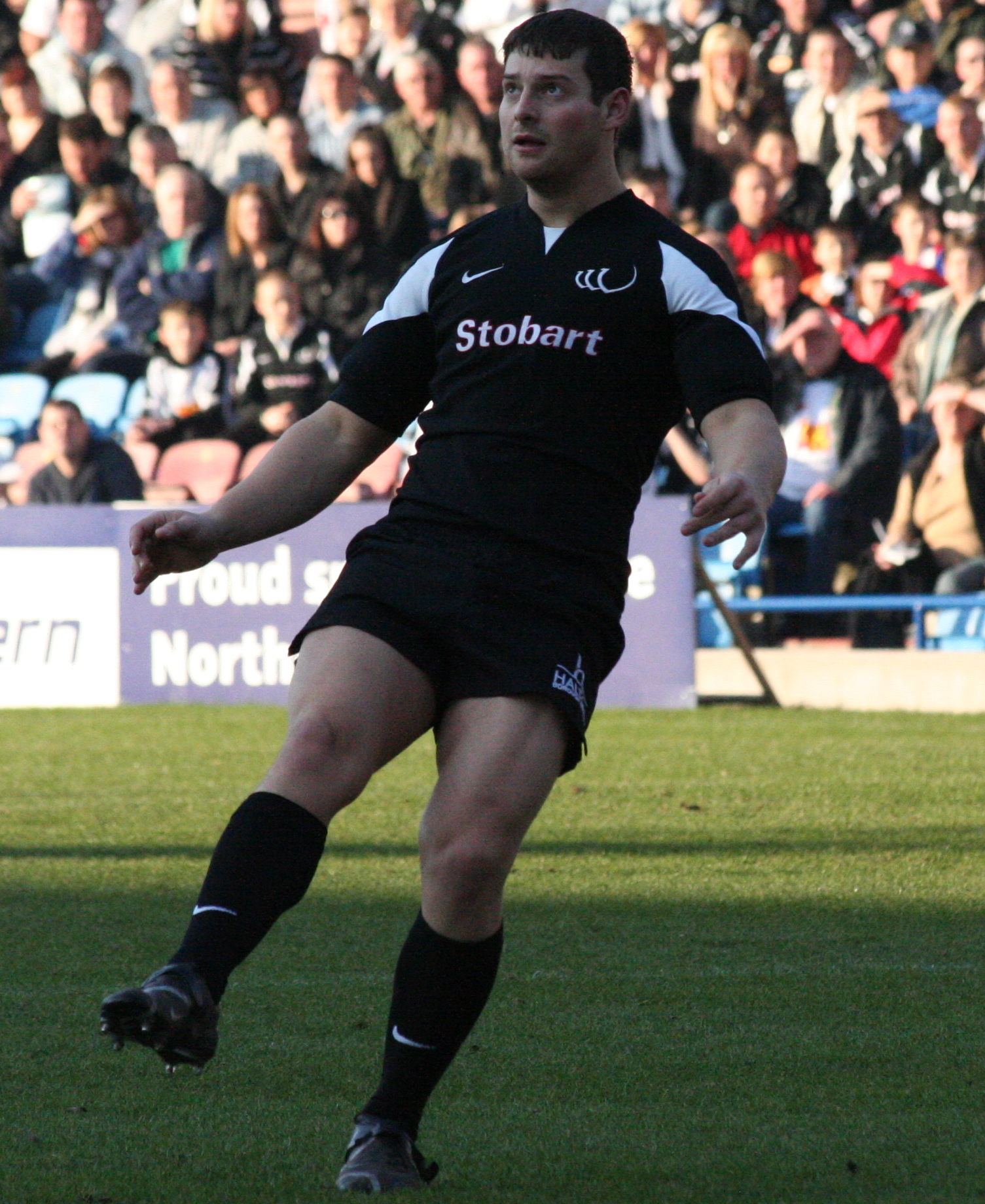

Personal information
- Full name: Tim Hartley
- Born: 2 January 1986 (age 40) Warrington, Cheshire, England

Playing information
- Height: 6 ft 0 in (1.83 m)
- Weight: 14 st 2 lb (90 kg)
- Position: Wing, Centre, Stand-off
Club
Years	Team	Pld	T	G	FG	P
2003–05	Salford City Reds	17	5	0	0	20
2006	Harlequins RL	3	3	0	0	12
2007	Halifax RLFC
2008–09	Widnes Vikings	34	11	108		260
2010	Leigh Centurions	5	0	9	0	18
	Total	59	19	117	0	310

Tim Hartley (born 2 January 1986), also known by the nickname of "Trev", is an English former professional rugby league footballer who played in the 2000s and 2010s. He played at representative level for Lancashire Academy (Under-16s and Under-18s) and British Amateur Rugby League Association (BARLA) NWC Oceanic 2001 tour, and at club level for Leigh Miners Rangers, in the Super League debuted for; the Salford City Reds v Leeds Rhinos, Harlequins RL, and for; Halifax, the Widnes Vikings and the Leigh Centurions, as a wing, centre or stand-off.

== Background ==
Hartley was born in Warrington, Cheshire, England, he was a pupil at Bedford High School, Leigh, after retiring at 24 has since been a P.E. Teacher and as of now 2020 works in hospital pre installations.

== Club career ==
Hartley made his début for Salford City Reds aged 18 against the Leeds Rhinos. After 2 Seasons was part of a Transfer fee to Harlequins Rl under Tony Rea. Then played for Halifax, Widnes and Leigh in the championship winning the Northern Rail cup in 2009.
