= Richard Fletcher (rugby league) =

Scotland international rugby league footballer

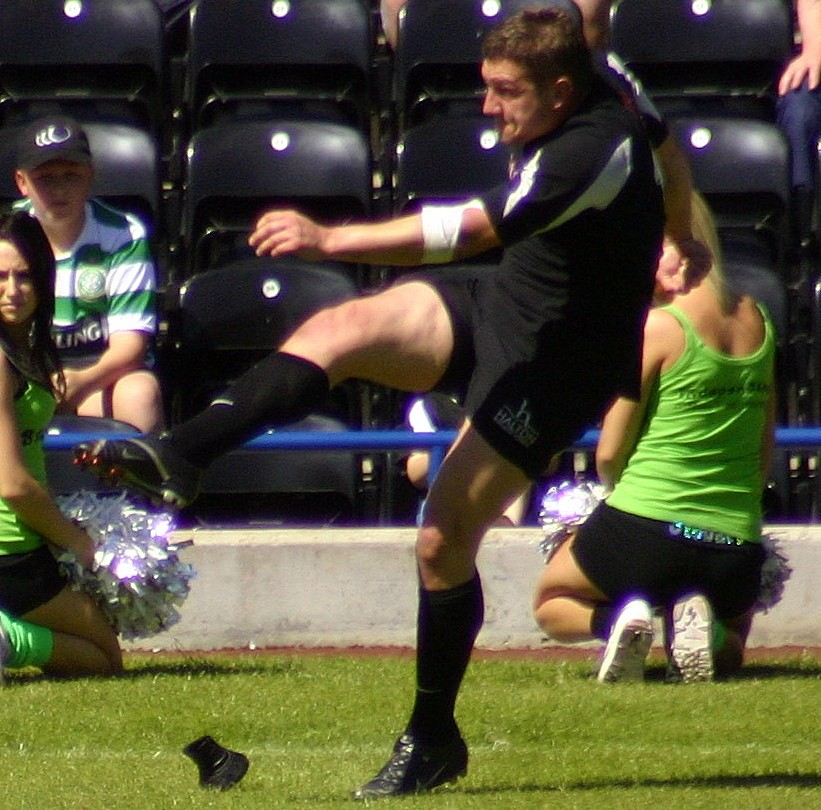

Personal information
- Full name: Richard Fletcher
- Born: 17 May 1981 (age 44) Kingston upon Hull, Humberside, England

Playing information
- Height: 6 ft 2 in (1.88 m)
- Weight: 16 st 3 lb (103 kg)
- Position: Prop, Second-row, Loose forward
Club
| Years | Team | Pld | T | G | FG | P |
|---|---|---|---|---|---|---|
| 1999–04 | Hull FC | 72 | 5 | 0 | 0 | 20 |
| 2004–05 | Eastern Suburbs Tigers |
| 2005–06 | Castleford Tigers | 33 | 4 | 17 | 0 | 50 |
| 2007–08 | Whitehaven | 25 | 14 | 8 | 0 | 72 |
| 2008 | Widnes Vikings | 24 | 10 | 9 | 0 | 58 |
| 2010–11 | Barrow Raiders | 2 | 0 | 0 | 0 | 0 |
| 2011 | Dewsbury Rams |
| | Total | 156 | 33 | 34 | 0 | 200 |
Representative
| Years | Team | Pld | T | G | FG | P |
| 2001–09 | Scotland | 9 | 2 | 0 | 0 | 8 |

Richard Fletcher (born 17 May 1981) is a former Scotland international rugby league footballer who played as a right-footed goal-kicking prop, second-row or loose forward in the 1990s, 2000s and 2010s.

He played at representative level for Great Britain (Academy) and Scotland, and at club level in the Super League for Hull FC and the Castleford Tigers, in the Queensland Cup for the Eastern Suburbs Tigers, and in the Championship for Whitehaven, Widnes Vikings, Barrow Raiders and the Dewsbury Rams.

== Background ==
Fletcher was born in Kingston upon Hull, Humberside.

== Playing career ==
=== International honours ===
Fletcher won nine caps for Scotland between 2001 and 2009, scoring two tries. He was forced to rule himself out of the squad for the 2008 Rugby League World Cup through personal reasons.

=== Club career ===
Fletcher was transferred from the Eastern Suburbs Tigers to Castleford during May 2005. He was later transferred from the Castleford to Whitehaven during February 2007.
