= Martin McLoughlin =

Ireland international rugby league footballer

Personal information
- Full name: Martin Paul McLoughlin
- Born: c. 1980 (age 45–46) England

Playing information
- Height: 6 ft 0 in (183 cm)
- Position: Prop
Club
| Years | Team | Pld | T | G | FG | P |
|---|---|---|---|---|---|---|
| ≤2001–02 | Wigan Warriors | 0 | 0 | 0 | 0 | 0 |
| 2002 (loan) | Barrow Raiders |
| 2003–04 | Oldham |
| ≤2006–06 | Batley Bulldogs |
| 2008 | Widnes Vikings | 2 |
| 2009 | Rochdale Hornets |
| | Total | 2 | 0 | 0 | 0 | 0 |
Representative
| Years | Team | Pld | T | G | FG | P |
| 2001–09 | Ireland | 10 |

Martin Paul McLoughlin (born c. 1980) is a former Ireland international rugby league footballer who played in the 2000s. He played at club level for the Wigan Warriors, Barrow Raiders, Oldham, Batley Bulldogs, Widnes Vikings, and the Rochdale Hornets. He played as a prop.

== Background ==
McLoughlin was born in England.

== International honours ==
Martin McLoughlin was capped for Ireland while at Wigan Warriors, Oldham R.L.F.C., and Batley Bulldogs in 2001–2008.
