= Dean Gaskell =

Ireland rugby league footballer

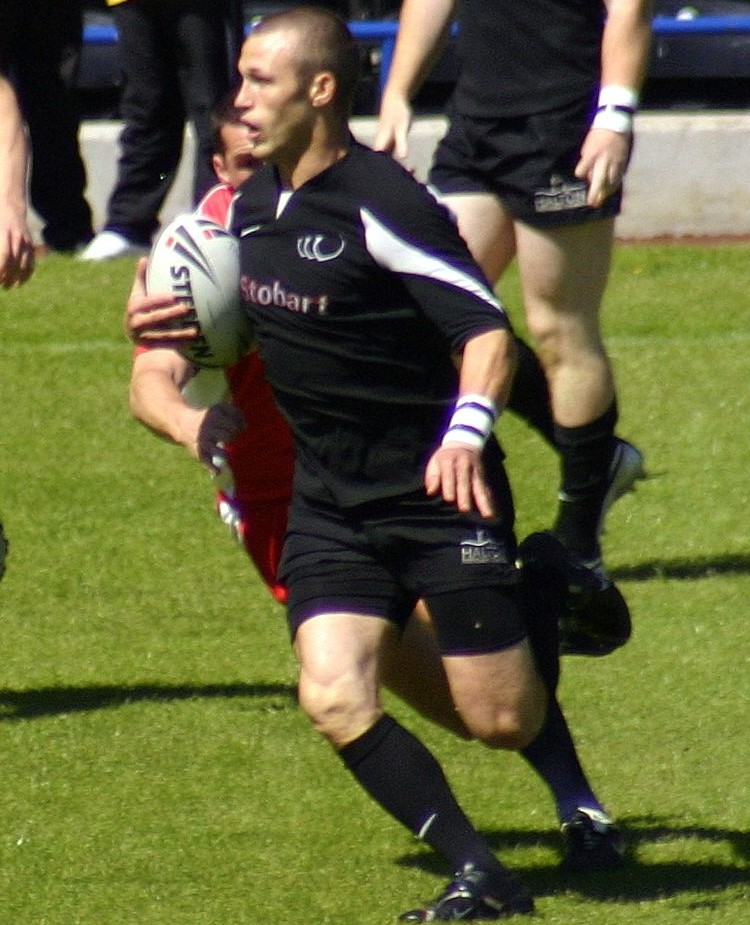

Personal information
- Born: 12 April 1983 (age 43) England

Playing information
- Height: 5 ft 11 in (1.80 m)
- Weight: 13 st 5 lb (85 kg)
- Position: Wing
Club
Years	Team	Pld	T	G	FG	P
2002–05	Warrington Wolves	63	12	0	0	48
2006	Leigh Centurions	24	13	0	0	52
2007–11	Widnes Vikings	93	43	0	0	172
	Total	180	68	0	0	272
Representative
Years	Team	Pld	T	G	FG	P
2003–05	Ireland	4	1	0	0	4

Dean Gaskell (born 12 April 1983) is a former Ireland international rugby league footballer.

== Background ==
Gaskell was born in England, and he is of Irish descent. He currently resides in Wigan

== Career ==
Gaskell played for the Widnes Vikings in National League One. He also played for Ireland.

Dean Gaskell's position of choice was on the wing, but he could also operate as a fullback.

Gaskell had previously played for the Leigh Centurions, and had Super League experience with the Warrington Wolves.

Dean Gaskell was successful with Widnes, in 2007 scoring 10 tries in 14 games.

Gaskell is an Ireland international, however he missed the winter programme and the games against Russia and Lebanon through injury.

He was named in the Ireland training squad for the 2008 Rugby League World Cup.

After Rugby League, he had a short but successful stint in MMA , with a record of 5 wins and 1 loss.
