= John Duffy (rugby league) =

Rugby League coach & former Scotland international rugby league footballer

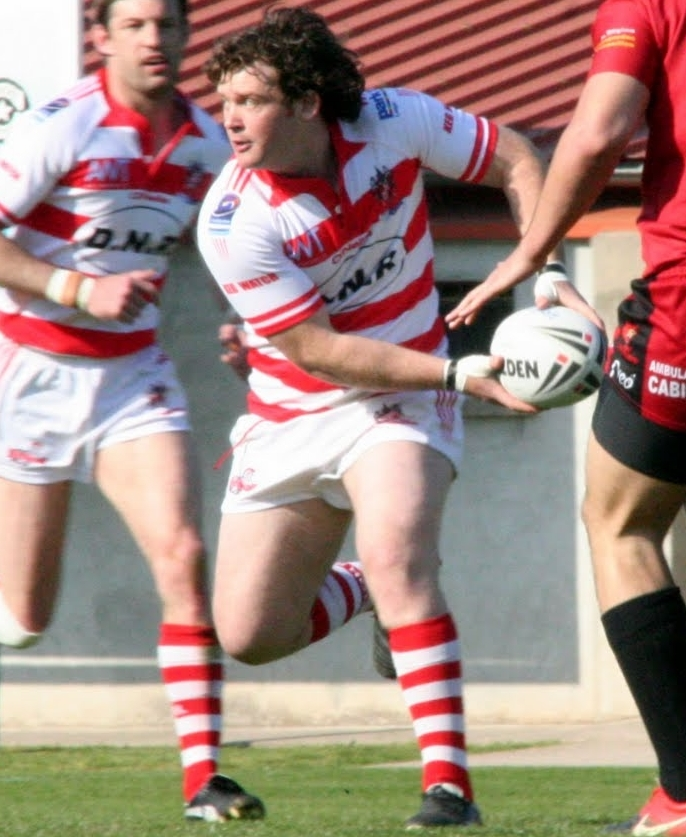

Personal information
- Full name: John Duffy
- Born: 2 July 1980 (age 45) Platt Bridge, Greater Manchester, England
- Height: 5 ft 8 in (1.73 m)
- Weight: 14 st 9 lb (93 kg)

Playing information
- Position: Scrum-half, Stand-off, Hooker
Club
Years	Team	Pld	T	G	FG	P
1997–99	Warrington Wolves	26	0	0	0	0
2000	Salford City Reds	14	0	1	1	3
2001	Leigh Centurions	26	3	0	0	12
2002	Chorley Lynx	10	2	0	0	8
2002–05	Leigh Centurions	101	34	18	3	175
2006–08	Whitehaven	56	21	13	0	110
2008–09	Widnes Vikings	49	10	0	0	40
2010–12	Leigh Centurions	68	14	2	0	60
	Total	350	84	34	4	408
Representative
Years	Team	Pld	T	G	FG	P
1997–12	Scotland	6	1	7	0	18

Coaching information
Club
Years	Team	Gms	W	D	L	W%
2014–17	Swinton Lions
2017–18	Featherstone Rovers	25	13	1	9	52
2019–21	Leigh Centurions	47	26	0	21	55
	Total	72	39	1	30	54
Representative
Years	Team	Gms	W	D	L	W%
2018	Scotland	3	0	0	3	0
- Source: As of 12 October 2023

John Duffy (born 2 July 1980) was the head coach of the Leigh Centurions in the Super League, and is a former Scotland international rugby league footballer who played as a scrum-half, stand-off and hooker in the 1990s, 2000s and 2010s.

Duffy played for the Leigh Centurions, Salford City Reds and Warrington Wolves in the Super League, and also for Whitehaven. He was a Scotland international.

He has held the position of head coach at the Swinton Lions and Featherstone Rovers in the Championship.

== Background ==
Duffy was born in Platt Bridge, Wigan, Greater Manchester, England.

== Career ==
Duffy became Super League's youngest débutant when he made his Warrington Wolves début at the age of 16.

He was named in the Scotland squad for the 2008 Rugby League World Cup, and was part of the coaching staff for their 2013 Rugby League World Cup campaign.

In June 2014, he was appointed head coach of Swinton Lions in the wake of Lions' player coach Ian Watson's departure to become Salford's assistant coach.

On 17 July 2017, Duffy resigned from Swinton after what had been a traumatic season for all concerned in the club. He immediately took up a new post with Featherstone Rovers after their coach Jon Sharp left the club.

On 2 June 2021, it was announced that Duffy had parted with Leigh Centurions as head coach, by mutual consent after Leigh started the 2021 Super League season with eight straight defeats.
