= Lee Paterson =

Former Scotland international rugby league footballer

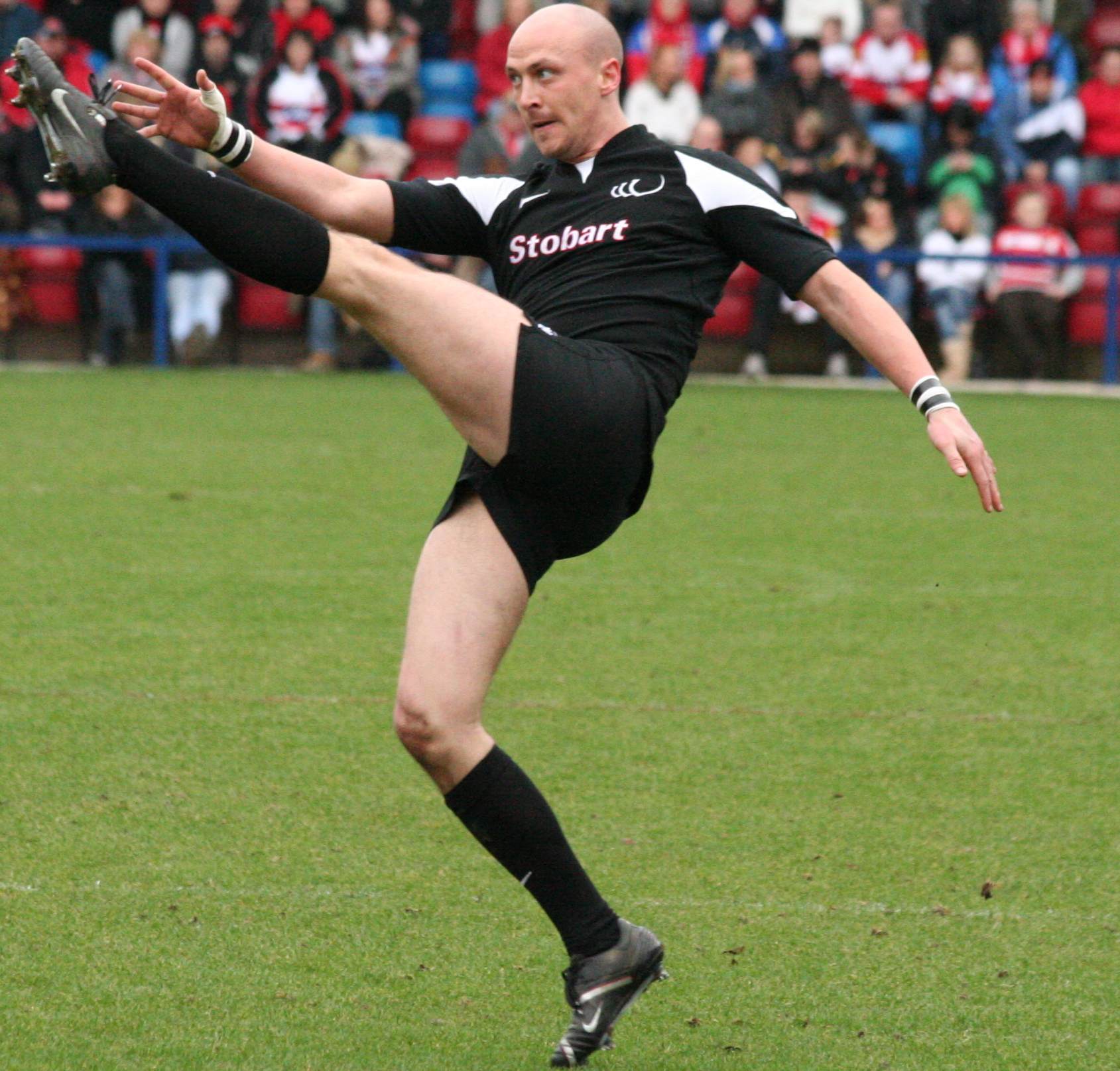

Personal information
- Born: 5 July 1981 (age 44); York, North Yorkshire, England

Playing information
- Height: 6 ft 1 in (1.85 m)
- Weight: 14 st 7 lb (92 kg)
- Position: Wing, Centre, Stand-off, Loose forward
Club
Years	Team	Pld	T	G	FG	P
2002–04	Keighley Cougars	58	7	3	0	34
2005–06	York City Knights	44	4	8	0	32
2007	Batley Bulldogs	20	4	2	0	20
2007–08	Carpentras XIII	10	4	12	0	40
2008–09	Widnes Vikings	33	14	0	0	56
2010–11	Carpentras XIII	22	4	80	0	176
2013	Whitehaven	30	4	0	0	12
2014	York City Knights	18	4	0	0	16
2014	Newcastle Thunder	18	2	1	0	10
	Total	253	47	106	0	396
Representative
Years	Team	Pld	T	G	FG	P
2007–12	Scotland	12	3	4	0	20

Lee Paterson (born 5 July 1981) is a former Scotland international rugby league footballer who played in the 2000s and 2010s. He played at club level for the Keighley Cougars, York City Knights, Widnes Vikings, as a centre, stand-off or loose forward.

== Background ==
Paterson was born in Castleford, Yorkshire, England.

== Playing career ==
Paterson played with his home town team York City Knights, winning the 2005 National League Two with them, before moving to Batley in 2007. He played for Widnes Vikings Featherstone Rovers and Mackay Cutters in Australia before rejoining York City in 2014.

== International honours ==
Paterson won caps for Scotland while at the Widnes Vikings.

Paterson was named in the Scotland squad for the 2008 Rugby League World Cup.
