= Gavin Dodd =

Former Ireland international rugby league footballer

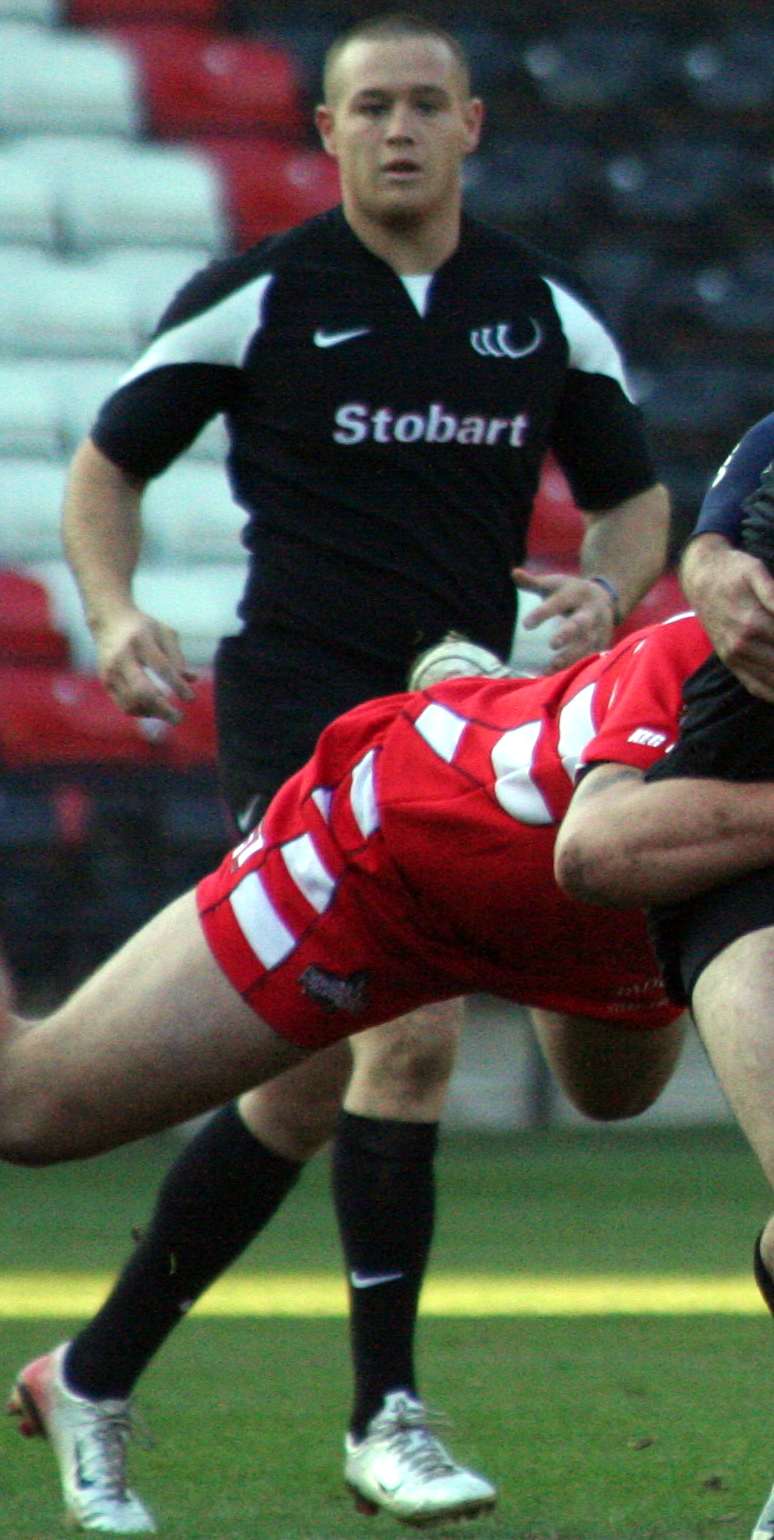

Personal information
- Full name: Gavin Dodd
- Born: 28 February 1982 (age 43); Manchester, England
- Height: 5 ft 11 in (1.80 m)
- Weight: 14 st 9 lb (93 kg)

Playing information
- Position: Wing, Centre, Fullback
Club
| Years | Team | Pld | T | G | FG | P |
|---|---|---|---|---|---|---|
| 2001–05 | Oldham R.L.F.C. | 5 | 4 | | | 16 |
| 2006–09 | Widnes Vikings | 21 | 21 | 28 | | 140 |
| 2011 | Swinton Lions | 2 | 1 | | | 4 |
| | Total | 28 | 26 | 28 | 0 | 160 |
Representative
| Years | Team | Pld | T | G | FG | P |
| 2006–07 | Ireland | 3 | 3 | 0 | 0 | 12 |
- As of 3 February 2021

Gavin Dodd is a former Ireland international rugby league footballer.

Dodd plays for Swinton in National League One. He also plays for Ireland.

Dodd's position of choice is as a wing or at fullback, but he can also operate as a centre.

Gavin Dodd is also a useful goal-kicker.

Dodd has previously played for Oldham and Widnes, and was on the fringes of the first team at the Bradford Bulls.

Gavin Dodd had however been a revelation with Widnes, in 2007 scoring 21 tries in 21 games and also converting 28 attempts at goal. He holds the Widnes record for points in a game consisting of a hat-trick of tries and 13 goals vs Doncaster in 2007, his total was 38.

As of the 2010 season Dodd played for Swinton.

Dodd is an Ireland international, playing in the recent games against Russia and Lebanon.

He has been named in the Ireland training squad for the 2008 Rugby League World Cup.

== Rugby union ==
In 2005-06 he had a trial with rugby union team Glasgow Warriors. He played in one game; a friendly against Newcastle Falcons academy side.
