= Steve Tyrer =

English rugby league footballer

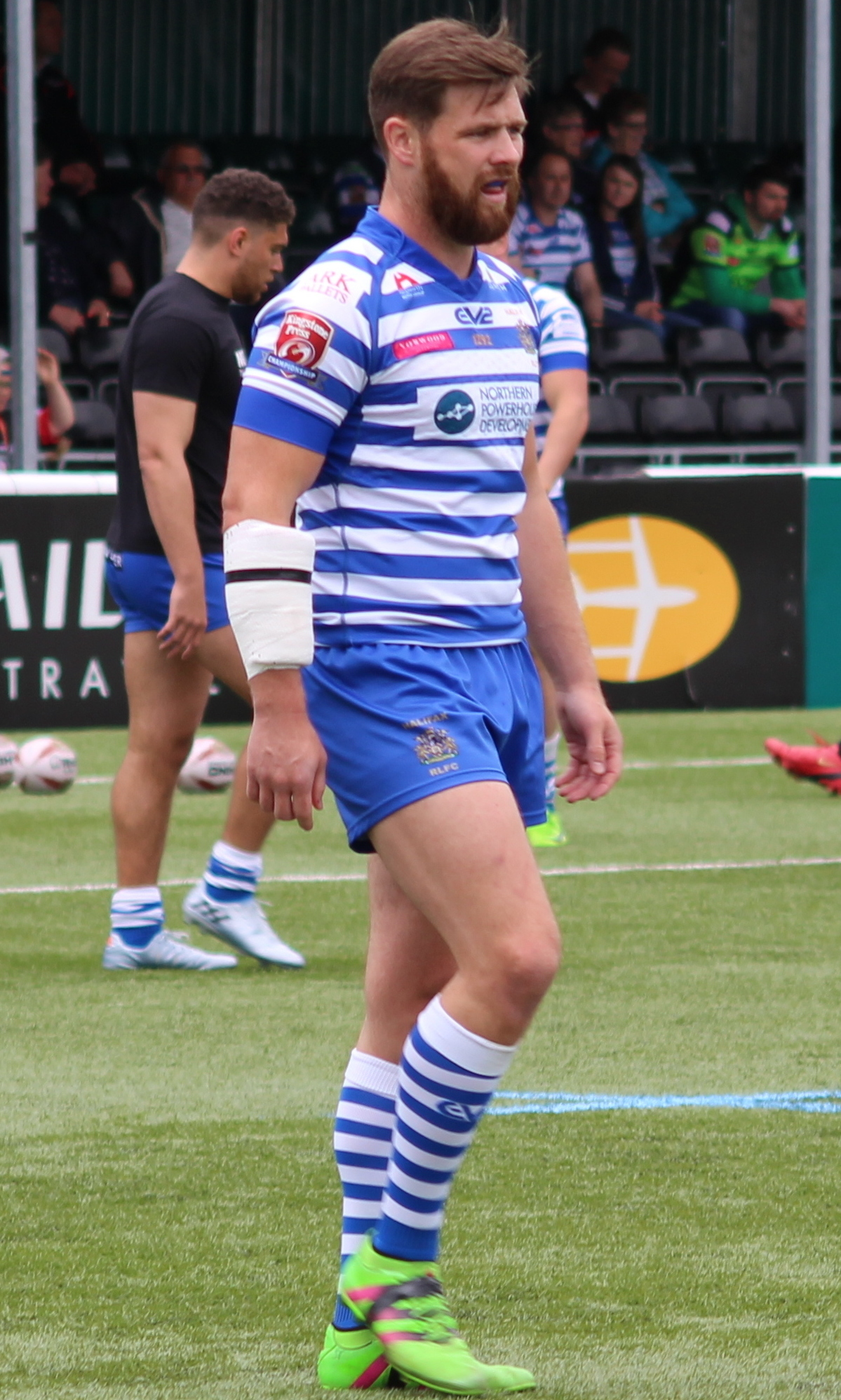

Personal information
- Full name: Stephen Tyrer
- Born: 16 March 1989 (age 37) St Helens, Merseyside, England

Playing information
- Height: 6 ft 0 in (1.83 m)
- Weight: 13 st 8 lb (86 kg)
- Position: Centre, Wing
Club
Years	Team	Pld	T	G	FG	P
2006–10	St Helens	22	12	54	0	156
2008(loan)	→ Widnes Vikings	10	7	36	0	100
2009(loan)	→ Celtic Crusaders	9	2	5	0	18
2009(loan)	→ Widnes Vikings	3	0	5	0	10
2010(loan)	→ Salford City Reds	20	6	9	0	42
2011–12	Widnes Vikings	25	22	106	0	300
2012–20	Halifax	217	115	762	0	1984
2021–22	Widnes Vikings	41	17	95	0	258
	Total	347	181	1072	0	2868

Stephen Tyrer (born 16 March 1989) is a former rugby league footballer who last played as a goal-kicking centre or winger for Widnes Vikings in the Championship.

Tyrer previously played for St Helens, where he began his career, the Salford Red Devils and Widnes Vikings in the Super League.

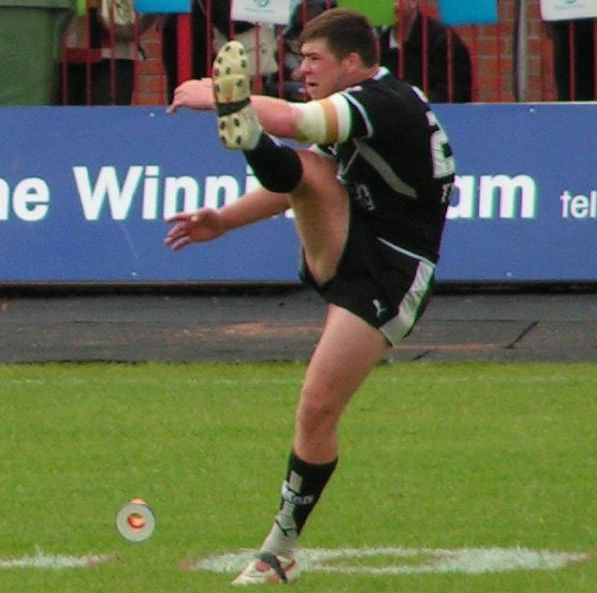
Tyrer playing for St Helens

== Background ==
Tyrer was born in St Helens, Merseyside, England.

== Playing career ==
=== St Helens ===
In November 2006, Tyrer was promoted to train with the St. Helens first team squad. Tyrer made a big impact on the first team squad in 2007, making a try scoring home début against Bradford, his strong running and goal kicking ability cemented his place as one of the games brightest prospects. Having made a significant contribution in Saints early win over Batley in the Challenge Cup, Tyrer was given a place in the squad for the first final at the new Wembley, although he did not take part in the match, he did receive a competition winner's medal. Having played his first full season as number 24, Tyrer was given the number 22 jersey for the 2008 Super League season. He found his opportunities limited however in a strong Saints squad.

=== Widnes Vikings ===
He spent the final third of the 2008 season on loan at Widnes where he wore the number 3 jersey and scored over 100 points, including two second half tries and several conversions in his début against Salford.

=== Celtic Crusaders ===
After Widnes missed out on a place in the 2009 Super League competition, Tyrer parted with the club to pursue his top flight ambitions with Crusaders.

=== Salford City Reds ===
This was followed by another season on loan at Salford.

=== Widnes ===
In late 2010, Tyrer was released from his Saints contract and returned to Widnes where he hoped to win a long-term contract before Widnes recently announced their return to Super League for the 2012 season.

=== Halifax ===
Tyrer did not win a contract at Widnes so he joined Halifax. He was one of a few Widnes players to join Halifax after not winning a Super League contract at Widnes. Tyrer went on to score 1,984 points for Halifax and sits second in the clubs all time points scoring charts behind hall of famer Ronnie James.

Tyrer was inducted into the Halifax Rugby League Hall of Fame in October 2023.

=== Widnes Vikings (rejoined) ===
On 18 August 2020 it was announced that Tyrer was re-joining Widnes Vikings for the 2021 season. He retired at the end of the 2022 season.
