= Chris Dean (rugby league) =

English rugby league footballer

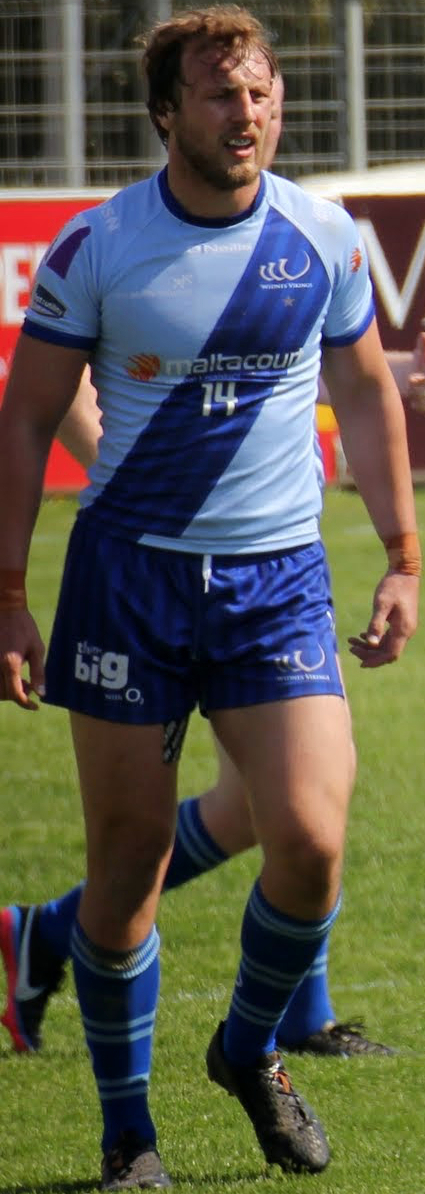

Personal information
- Full name: Christopher Dean
- Born: 17 January 1988 (age 38) Higher End, Wigan, Greater Manchester, England

Playing information
- Height: 6 ft 2 in (1.88 m)
- Weight: 16 st 5 lb (104 kg)
- Position: Centre, Second-row
Club
Years	Team	Pld	T	G	FG	P
2007–10	St Helens	23	10	0	0	40
2008(loan)	→ Widnes Vikings	11	4	0	0	16
2011	Wakefield Trinity Wildcats	21	9	0	0	36
2012–19	Widnes Vikings	169	33	1	0	134
	Total	224	56	1	0	226

Christopher David Dean (born 17 January 1988) is an English former professional rugby league footballer who played as a centre, second-row forward or on the wing in the 2000s and 2010s.

He played for St Helens in the Super League, and on loan from St. Helens at the Widnes Vikings in the Championship. Dean also played for the Wakefield Trinity Wildcats in the top flight, as well as Widnes in the top flight and the second tier.

== Background ==
Dean was born in Higher End, Wigan, Greater Manchester, England.

== Career ==
Dean signed for St Helens aged 15 from the Orrell St James club in the Orrell district of Wigan.

Dean made 23 first team appearances for St Helens scoring 10 tries. In December 2010, Wakefield Trinity Wildcats announced that Dean had joined the club on a one-year contract from Saints for the 2011 season in which he picked up 9 tries from 21 appearances.

In August 2011 it was reported that Dean would join Widnes for the 2012 season having previously had two loan spells at the club. Dean signed a three-year extension with Widnes in October 2014, followed in 2016 by a further extension until the 2018 season.
