= Jim Gannon (rugby league) =

Australian rugby league footballer

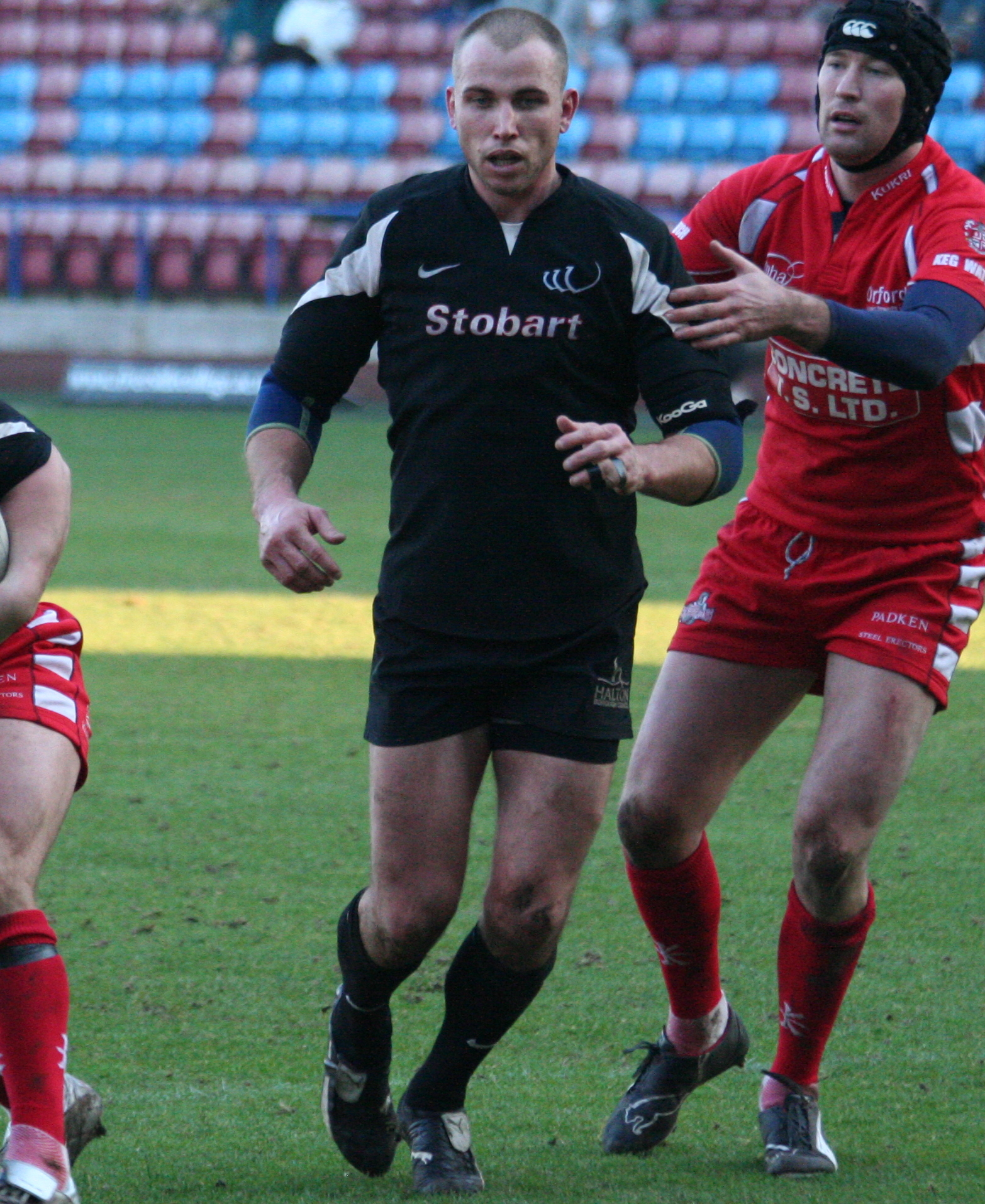

Personal information
- Full name: James Gannon
- Born: 16 June 1977 (age 49) Newcastle, New South Wales, Australia

Playing information
- Height: 191 cm (6 ft 3 in)
- Weight: 107 kg (16 st 12 lb)
- Position: Prop
Club
Years	Team	Pld	T	G	FG	P
1998–99	Balmain Tigers	22	0	0	0	0
1998–02	Halifax Blue Sox	95	17	0	0	68
2003–06	Huddersfield Giants	100	11	0	0	44
2007	Hull Kingston Rovers	24	1	0	0	4
2008–10	Widnes Vikings	87	19	0	0	76
2011–13	Halifax	54	5	0	0	20
	Total	382	53	0	0	212
- Relatives: Morgan Gannon (son)

Jim Gannon (born 16 June 1977) is an Australian former professional rugby league footballer who played as a prop in the 1990s, 2000s and 2010s.

== Playing career ==
Jim Gannon captained the New South Wales Under-18s to a series win. He was a Newcastle Knights junior playing Harold Matthews, SG Ball and reserve grade for the Newcastle Knights. Gannon's first-grade career began at Balmain Tigers where he made 22 appearances as a substitute in 1998 and 1999.

=== Halifax RLFC ===
Gannon arrived in the Super League at Halifax midway through the 1999 campaign. He made 87 Super League appearances at Halifax before making the short trip to the Huddersfield Giants in 2003. Gannon was a key member of the Huddersfield Giants pack for four seasons, making 93 appearances. He played for Huddersfield in the 2006 Challenge Cup Final as a prop forward against St. Helens but the Huddersfield Giants lost 12–42.

=== Hull KR ===
Gannon signed for Hull Kingston Rovers in 2007 in preparation for the club's first season in the Super League. He made 24 appearances for Hull Kingston Rovers helping them secure their Super League status for the 2008 season.

=== Widnes Vikings ===
Gannon was released from the second year of his contract with Hull Kingston Rovers to join National League One club the Widnes Vikings for the 2008 season.

=== Halifax RLFC (re-join) ===
After spending three successful seasons with the Widnes Vikings, which included winning a Northern Rail Cup winners medal in 2009, Gannon re-joined his adopted home town club of Halifax for the 2011 season.
