= List of Widnes Vikings players =

Widnes Vikings are an English rugby league club based in Widnes, Cheshire.

The following is a list former and current Widnes Vikings players across various metrics who have played for the club since the formation of the Northern Union in 1895. Players are listed in alphabetical order.

== Players with 100+ caps ==
Name	Club career	Appearances	Tries	Goals	DGs	Points	Ref
Mick Adams	1971–84	415	68	39	26	309	
Patrick Ah Van	2012–18	119	91	73	0	510	
David Allen	2006, 2010–14	134	35	0	0	140	
Harry Anderson	1947–52	101	18	7	0	68	
George Aspey	1896–1914	471	39	36	0	189	
Mal Aspey	1964–80	575	236	125	0	958	
Sam Aspey	1903–15	279	28	0	0	84	
Ken Barber	1934–40	136	31	0	0	93	
John Basnett	1981–87	201	103	0	0	381	
Edgar Bate	1955–65	271	10	0	0	30	
Ron Bate	1960–65	115	4	0	0	12	
Robert Baty	1896–1901	134	5	87	0	189	
Bob Blackwood	1971–75, 1983–85	102	8	0	0	24	
Joe Bourke	1945–50	113	7	0	0	21	
Reg Bowden	1969–80	374	42	2	4	134	
Jimmy Boylan	1965–71	172	22	16	0	98	
Frank Bradley	1939–52	159	14	112	0	266	
Walter Bradley	1929–40	338	17	5	0	61	
Jack Brassington	1912–26	263	5	3	0	21	
Danny Brennan	1895–1901	263	24	2	1	80	
Jimmy Bright	1958–63	110	26	0	0	78	
Jack Broome	1956–60	110	17	0	0	51	
Dennis Brown	1964–75	173	94	3	0	288	
Mick Burke	1978–87	307	64	708	2	1638	
Hep Cahill	2012–	142	7	0	0	28	
Phil Cantillon	1999–2003	152	115	0	0	460	
Robert Chisnall	1958–66	230	90	0	0	270	
John Corcoran	1912–28	211	7	0	0	21	
Danny Craven	2010–	100	35	41	3	225	
Jack Crompton	1922–33	126	36	0	0	108	
Andy Currier	1983–93, 1997	249	118	201	1	875	
Harry Curtis	1899–1905	112	1	0	0	3	
Jonathan Davies	1988–93	134	80	434	4	1192	
Harry Dawson	1951–63	248	95	383	0	1051	
Chris Dean	2008, 2010, 2012–	155	34	0	0	136	
Ray Dutton	1965–78	398	13	1073	10	2195	
Keith Elwell	1970–86	594	87	14	36	335	
Richie Eyres	1984–93, 1999	296	60	1	2	244	
Paddy Flynn	2008–16	168	95	1	0	382	
Mick George	1971–82	296	108	0	1	325	
Alex Gerrard	2010–18	113	8	0	0	32	
Rhys Hanbury	2012–18	176	87	107	1	563	
Aaron Heremaia	2015–18	102	10	0	0	40	
Jimmy Hoey	1922–35	308	101	395	0	1093	
Ben Kavanagh	2008–15	166	17	0	0	68	
Macgraff Leuluai	2011–	159	13	0	0	52	
Stefan Marsh	2010, 2012–18	141	68	21	0	314	
Joe Mellor	2011–18	177	66	1	1	267	
Frank Myler	1955–67	369	144	7	0	446	
Tony Myler	1979–93	258	89	0	0	327	
George Nicholls	1966–73	218	38	1	0	116	
Martin Offiah	1987–91	145	181	0	0	724	
Robert Randall	1960–65	154	7	389	0	799	
Kurt Sorensen	1985–93	252	40	0	0	160	
Alan Tait	1987–92	136	55	1	3	225	
Alf Taylor	1901–08	136	12	25	0	86	
Harry Taylor	1908–22	264	43	162	0	453	
Ike Taylor	1900–14	103	20	5	0	70	
William Thompson	1956–65	237	110	0	0	330	
Jim Tilley	1900–07	168	7	81	0	183	
Harold Tomlinson	1952–62	159	15	0	0	45	
Peter Topping	1927–40	414	96	195	0	678	
William Townsend	1912–23	133	8	0	0	24	
Alan Walsh	1963–76	264	14	0	0	42	
Clarry Warburton	1938–50	114	3	0	0	9	
John Warlow	1969–74	133	2	1	0	8	
Martin Webster	1899–1906	176	4	0	0	12	
Lloyd White	2012–18	146	39	45	1	247	
Fred Whitfield	1979–86	110	15	0	0		
Robin Whitfield	1961–68	116	20	209	0	478	
Matt Whitley	2015–18	100	20	0	0	80	
Charlie Wilcox	1948–54	120	8	0	0	24	
Brian Winstanley	1959–66	122	17	0	0	51	
Darren Wright	1985–96	345	107	0	0	428	
Stuart Wright	1976–87	263	151	0	0	464	
Harry Young	1916–26	180	77	2	0	235	

== Players earning international caps whilst at Widnes ==
=== Represented Great Britain ===
- Michael "Mick" Adams
- John Basnett
- Keith Bentley
- Michael "Mick" Burke
- Frank Collier
- Andy Currier
- Jonathan Davies
- John Devereux
- Ray Dutton
- David Eckersley
- Keith Elwell
- Richard Eyres
- John Fieldhouse
- Ian Hare
- Alec Higgins
- Fred Higgins
- Leslie "Les" Holliday
- Eric Hughes
- David Hulme
- Paul Hulme
- Leslie "Les" Gorley
- Arthur 'Chick' Johnson
- George Kemel
- Dennis O'Neill
- Thomas "Tommy" McCue
- Steve McCurrie
- James "Jim" Measures
- 'Big' Jim Mills
- Frank Myler
- Anthony "Tony" Myler
- George Nicholls
- Martin Offiah
- Michael "Mike" O'Neill
- Harry Pinner
- Nat Silcock Sr.
- Glyn Shaw
- Stuart Spruce
- Alan Tait
- Darren Wright
- Stuart Wright

=== Represented England ===
- Michael "Mick" Adams
- Michael "Mick" Burke
- Phil Cantillon
- Ray Dutton
- David Eckersley
- Keith Elwell
- Richard Eyres
- John "Jackie" Fleming
- Ray French
- Leslie "Les" Gorley
- Alec Higgins
- Fred Higgins
- Gareth Hock
- Jimmy Hoey
- Eric Hughes
- David Hulme
- Paul Hulme
- Arthur 'Chick' Johnson
- Frederick "Fred" Kelsall
- John "Jack" Lally
- Doug Laughton
- Thomas "Tommy" McCue
- Steve McCurrie
- Hugh McDowell
- Harry Millington
- Daniel "Danny" Naughton
- George Nicholls
- Andy Platt
- William Reid
- Robert Roberts
- Thomas "Tommy" Shannon
- Nat Silcock Sr.
- Stuart Spruce
- Jimmy Walker
- Darren Wright
- Stuart Wright
- Harry Young
- Kevin Brown

=== Represented Ireland ===
- Phil Cantillon
- David Allen
- Lee Doran
- Kurt Haggerty
- Anthony Mullally

=== Represented Scotland ===
- John Duffy
- Iain Morrison
- Lee Paterson
- Alan Tait

=== Represented Wales ===
- Rhodri Lloyd
- Lloyd White
- Jonathan Davies
- Richard Eyres
- Adrian Hadley
- John Devereux
- 'Big' Jim Mills
- Glyn Shaw

=== Represented France ===
- Adel Fellous

=== Represented Tonga ===
- Lee Hansen

== Hall of Fame ==
The Widnes Hall of Fame was instituted in 1991 with thirteen members. Any former Widnes player who was retired from playing was eligible. The thirteen players who make up the current Hall of Fame are:

- Mick Adams
- Mick Burke
- Keith Elwell
- Fred Higgins
- Jimmy Hoey
- Arthur 'Chick' Johnson
- Vince Karalius
- Doug Laughton
- Tommy McCue
- Harry Millington
- 'Big' Jim Mills
- Frank Myler
- Nat Silcock, Sr.
- Kurt Sorensen
- Martin Offiah

=== Other notable players ===
- Mal Aspey
- Reg Bowden
- Jim Boylan (Lancashire circa-1971)
- Phil Cantillon
- Eddie Cunningham
- Andy Currier
- Andy Gregory
- Joey Grima
- Vince Karalius
- Emosi Koloto
- Joe Lydon
- George Nicholls
- Kurt Sorensen
- Alan Tait

== Super League era players ==
The following players represented the club when the Vikings were in the Super League from 2002 to 2005 and also from 2012 to 2018.

=== 2002–2005 ===
- Paul Alcock circa-2003
- Paul Atcheson circa-2002
- Paul Ballard circa-2005
- Richie Barnett Jnr circa-2005
- Adam Bibey circa-2004
- Deon Bird circa-2003
- Michael "Mike" Briggs circa-2002
- Blake Cannova circa-2002
- Phil Cantillon circa-2002
- Steve Carter circa-2002
- Mick Cassidy circa -2005
- Sean Conway circa-2002
- Gary Connolly circa-2005
- Owen Craigie circa-2005
- Paul Crook circa-2005
- Jason Demetriou circa-2002
- Paul Devlin circa-2002
- Jamie Durbin circa-2005
- Barry Eaton circa-2002
- Andrew Emelio circa-2005
- Sala Fa'alogo circa-2004
- Anthony Farrell circa-2002
- Simon Finnigan circa-2003
- Daniel Frame circa-2002
- Tommy Gallagher circa-2004
- Christopher "Chris" Giles circa-2003
- Marvin Golden circa-2003
- Gareth Haggerty circa-2002
- Steve Hall circa-2004
- Andrew "Andy" Hay circa-2003
- Andrew "Andy" Hobson circa-2004
- Timothy "Tim" Holmes circa-2004
- Adam Hughes circa-2002
- Gary Hulse circa-2005
- Aled James circa-2003
- Bruce Johnson circa-2004
- Keiran Kerr circa-2005
- Dean Lawford circa-2003
- Karl Long circa-2002
- Misili Manu circa-2005
- Steve McCurrie circa-2002
- Ryan McDonald circa-2002
- Gary Middlehurst circa-2004
- Shane Millard circa-2003
- David Mills circa-2002
- Aaron Moule circa-2004
- Damian Munro circa-2002
- Justin Murphy circa-2004
- Stephen Myler circa-2003
- Stephen Nash circa-2005
- Terrence "Terry" O'Connor circa-2005
- Julian O'Neill circa-2003
- Julian O'Neill circa-2002
- Christopher "Chris" Percival circa-2002
- Willie Peters circa-2004
- Daniel "Dan" Potter circa-2002
- Robert Relf circa-2002
- Sean Richardson circa-2002
- John Robinson circa-2003
- Stephen Rowlands circa-2004
- Nicholas "Nicky" Royle circa-2004
- Ryan Sheridan circa-2003
- Mark Smith circa-2005
- Stuart Spruce circa-2002
- John Stankevitch circa-2005
- Troy Stone circa-2002
- Gray Viane circa-2005
- Brad Watts circa-2005
- Craig Weston circa-2002
- Matthew Whitaker circa-2004
- Jon Whittle circa-2005
- Philip "Phil" Wood circa-2004
- Darren Woods circa-2005
- Troy Wozniak circa-2004

=== 2012–2018 ===
- Patrick Ah Van 2012–2018
- Dave Allen 2012–2014
- Tom Armstrong 2017
- Olly Ashall-Bott 2016–Present
- Keanan Brand 2018–Present
- Shaun Briscoe 2012–2013
- Alex Brown 2012
- Kevin Brown 2013–2016
- Chris Bridge 2016–2017
- Sam Brooks 2016–2017
- Jack Buchanan 2017
- Greg Burke 2016–2018
- Kieran Butterworth 2013–2015
- Liam Carberry 2014–2015
- Hep Cahill 2012–Present
- Ed Chamberlain 2015–2018
- Ted Chapelhow 2015–Present
- Jay Chapelhow 2015–Present
- Jon Clarke 2012–2014
- Chris Clarkson 2015
- Thomas Coyle 2012
- Danny Craven 2012–Present
- Ben Cross 2012–2013
- Ben Davies 2012–2013
- Chris Dean 2012–Present
- Gil Dudson 2016–2018
- Owen Farnworth 2018–Present
- Simon Finnigan 2012
- Paddy Flynn 2012–2016
- Danny Galea 2014–2015
- Alex Gerrard 2012–2018
- Tom Gilmore 2012–Present
- Grant Gore 2012–2015
- Kurt Haggerty 2012
- Rhys Hanbury 2012–2018
- Aaron Heremaia 2015–2018
- Gareth Hock 2013
- Chris Houston 2016–2018
- Declan Hulme 2013–2015
- Ryan Ince 2015–Present
- Willie Isa 2012–2015
- Krisnan Inu 2018–2019
- Paul Johnson 2014–2015
- Jordan Johnstone 2017–Present
- Phil Joseph 2013–2015
- Ben Kavanagh 2012–2015
- John Kite 2012
- Adam Lawton 2013–2014
- Macgraff Leuluai 2012–Present
- Rhodri Lloyd 2014–
- Joe Lyons 2018–Present
- Manase Manuokafoa 2015–2017
- Stephen Marsh 2012–2018
- Paul Mcshane 2012
- Joe Mellor 2012–2018
- Scott Moore 2012
- Antony Mullally 2012
- Dan Norman 2018–Present
- Eamon O'Carroll 2012–2017
- Tom Olbison 2018
- Kato Ottio 2018
- Jack Owens 2012–2015
- Lloyd Roby 2018–Present
- Charly Runciman 2016–2018
- Setaimata Sa 2016
- Cameron Phelps 2012–2015
- Steve Pickersgill 2012–2014
- Corey Thompson 2016–2017
- Danny Tickle 2014–2016
- Anthony Watts 2012
- Brad Walker 2016–Present
- Liam Walsh 2018–Present
- Lloyd White 2012–2018
- Matt Whitley 2015–2017
- Sam Wilde 2018–Present
- Frank Winterstein 2012–2013

Shane Grady
