= 2005 Widnes Vikings season =

- Super League X Rank: 11th
- Challenge Cup: Quarter Finalists
- 2005 record: Wins: 6; draws: 1; losses: 21
- Points scored: For: 598; against: 1048

Team information
- Coach: Frank Endacott
- Stadium: Halton Stadium
- Avg. attendance: 6,794 (League Only)
- High attendance: 9,825 (vs. Warrington Wolves, July 3rd)
- Low attendance: 2,263 (vs. Swinton Lions, April 3rd )
← 2004	List of seasons	2006 →

Widnes Vikings competed in their fourth consecutive Super League season in 2005 but would be relegated to the National League One at the end of an extremely disappointing year for the Vikings. In preparation for the start of the 2005 season they had appointed Frank Endacott, who had previously coached the Wigan Warriors, as well as signing former NRL prodigy Owen Craigie to the club. It was hoped that these men could once again lead Widnes to Super League safety once again and bounce back from a dismal 2004 season. While the Vikings managed to finish 11th in the League like last season they were nonetheless relegated due to the pending introduction of the Catalans Dragons in the 2006 season, they would not return to the top flight until 2012.

== 2005 fixtures and results ==
LEGEND
Win
Draw
Loss

=== Super League table ===
Pos	Team	Pld	W	D	L	PF	PA	PD	Pts	Qualification or relegation
1	St Helens	28	23	1	4	1028	537	+491	47	Semi Final
2	Leeds Rhinos	28	22	0	6	1152	505	+647	44	Semi Final
3	Bradford Bulls	28	18	1	9	1038	684	+354	37	Elimination Semi Final
4	Warrington Wolves	28	18	0	10	792	702	+90	36	Elimination Semi Final
5	Hull F.C.	28	15	2	11	756	670	+86	32	Elimination Semi Final
6	London Broncos	28	13	2	13	800	718	+82	28	Elimination Semi Final
7	Wigan Warriors	28	14	0	14	698	718	−20	28	
8	Huddersfield Giants	28	12	0	16	742	791	−49	24	
9	Salford City Reds	28	11	0	17	549	732	−183	22	
10	Wakefield Trinity Wildcats	28	10	0	18	716	999	−283	20	
11	Widnes Vikings	28	6	1	21	598	1048	−450	13	Relegation to National League One
12	Leigh Centurions	28	2	1	25	445	1210	−765	5	Relegation to National League One

Source: Rugby League Project
Rules for classification: 1) Points; 2) Points difference; 3) Number of points scored;

=== 2005 Super League Results ===
Date	Vrs	H/A	Result	Score	Tries	Goals	Field goals	Att	Lineup	Subs	
11/2/05	St Helens	A	L	40-18	Moule, Whitaker	Rowlands 5/5	N/A	12,395	1. Connolly, 5. Emelio, 3. Moule, 21. Whittle, 19. Rowlands, 6. Craigie, 14. Hulse, 15. Whitaker, 9. Millard, 10. O'Neill, 11. Cassidy, 12. Stankevitch, 16. Frame	4. Hughes, 13. Finnigan, 20. Smith, 18. Fa'alogo	-
20/2/05	Bradford Bulls	H	W	31-22	Craigie (2), Moule, Whitaker, Whittle, Millard	Rowlands 3/7	Craigie	7,230	1. Connolly, 5. Emelio, 3. Moule, 21. Whittle, 19. Rowlands, 6. Craigie, 14. Hulse, 8. O'Connor, 9. Millard, 15. Whitaker, 11. Cassidy, 12. Stankevitch, 16. Frame	13. Finnigan, 18. Fa'alogo, 20. Smith, 17. Mills	-
27/2/05	Leeds Rhinos	A	L	66-8	Emelio	Rowlands 2/3	N/A	17,307	1. Connolly, 5. Emelio, 3. Moule, 21. Whittle, 19. Rowlands, 6. Craigie, 14. Hulse, 8. O'Connor, 9. Millard, 15. Whitaker, 11. Cassidy, 12. Stankevitch, 16. Frame	20. Smith, 10. O'Neill, 13. Finnigan, 18. Fa'alogo	-
6/3/05	Wigan Warriors	H	L	20-32	Rowlands, Finnigan, Emelio	Rowlands 4/6	N/A	9,004	1. Connolly, 5. Emelio, 3. Moule, 21. Whittle, 19. Rowlands, 6. Craigie, 14. Hulse, 8. O'Connor, 9. Millard, 10. O'Neill, 11. Cassidy, 13. Finnigan, 16. Frame	15. Whitaker, 18. Fa'alogo, 20. Smith, 12. Stankevitch	-
11/3/05	Huddersfield Giants	A	L	34-18	Finnigan (2), Moule (2)	Rowlands 1/4	N/A	3.383	1. Connolly, 5. Emelio, 3. Moule, 21. Whittle, 19. Rowlands, 6. Craigie, 14. Hulse, 8. O'Connor, 20. Smith, 15. Whitaker, 11. Cassidy, 16. Frame, 13. Finnigan	10. O'Neill, 18. Fa'alogo, 17. Mills, 12. Stankevitch	-
20/3/05	London Broncos	A	L	66-8	Moule (2)	Rowlands 0/2	N/A	3,365	24. Holmes, 5. Emelio, 3. Moule, 21. Whittle, 19. Rowlands, 13. Finnigan, 14. Hulse, 8. O'Connor, 20. Smith, 10. O'Neill, 11. Cassidy, 12. Stankevitch, 16. Frame	15. Whitaker, 17. Mills, 18. Fa'alogo, 27. Crook	-
25/3/05	Leigh Centurions	H	W	35-28	Hughes, Moule, Emelio (2), Whitaker, Hulse	Crook 5/6	Crook	6,026	19. Rowlands, 5. Emelio, 1. Connolly, 3. Moule, 4. Hughes, 27. Crook, 14. Hulse, 8. O'Connor, 20. Smith, 10. O'Neill, 12. Stankevitch, 16. Frame, 13. Finnigan	15. Whitaker, 18. Fa'alogo, 17. Mills, 23. Ballard	-
10/4/05	Hull F.C.	A	L	32-28	Finnigan (2), Moule, Frame, Emelio	Myler 4/6	N/A	9,078	24. Holmes, 30. Barnett, 28. Viane, 3. Moule, 5. Emelio, 6. Craigie, 7. Myler, 15. Whitaker, 20. Smith, 8. O'Connor, 11. Cassidy, 16. Frame, 13. Finnigan	12. Stankevitch, 14. Hulse, 17. Mills, 18. Fa'alogo	-
17/4/05	Salford City Reds	H	L	6-22	O'Connor	Myler 1/1	N/A	5,878	1. Connolly, 5. Emelio, 28. Viane, 3. Moule, 30. Barnett, 7. Myler, 14. Hulse, 8. O'Connor, 9. Millard, 15. Whitaker, 11. Cassidy, 16. Frame, 13. Finnigan	17. Mills, 12. Stankevitch, 18. Fa'alogo, 20. Smith	-
23/4/05	Leeds Rhinos	H	L	20-42	Millard (2), Frame, Barnett	Myler 2/4	N/A	6,524	14. Hulse, 28. Viane, 1. Connolly, 3. Moule, 30. Barnett, 7. Myler, 29. Durbin, 8. O'Connor, 9. Millard, 12. Stankevitch, 11. Cassidy, 16. Frame, 13. Finnigan	17. Mills, 31. Alcock, 10. O'Neill, 20. Smith	-
29/4/05	Wigan Warriors	A	L	23-22	Frame, Millard, Barnett, Viane	Stephen Myler 3/4	N/A	11.390	1. Connolly, 5. Emelio, 28. Viane, 3. Moule, 30. Barnett, 6. Craigie, 7. Myler, 8. O'Connor, 9. Millard, 12. Stankevitch, 11. Cassidy, 16. Frame, 13. Finnigan	14. Hulse, 18. Fa'alogo, 10. O'Neill, 20. Smith	-
15/5/05	Wakefield Trinity Wildcats	A	W	34-47	O'Connor, Finnigan, Hughes, Myler, Moule, Smith (2)	Myler 9/9	Craigie	3,802	1. Connolly, 5. Emelio, 4. Hughes, 3. Moule, 28. Viane, 6. Craigie, 7. Myler, 8. O'Connor, 9. Millard, 12. Stankevitch, 18. Fa'alogo, 16. Frame, 13. Finnigan	10. O'Neill, 14. Hulse, 15. Whitaker, 20. Smith	-
21/5/05	St Helens R.F.C.	H	L	22-29	Millard, Connolly, Whitaker, Emelio	Myler 3/5	N/A	7,641	24. Holmes, 5. Emelio, 4. Hughes, 1. Connolly, 28. Viane, 6. Craigie, 7. Myler, 8. O'Connor, 9. Millard, 12. Stankevitch, 11. Cassidy, 16. Frame, 13. Finnigan	10. O'Neill, 15. Whitaker, 18. Fa'alogo, 20. Smith	-
29/5/05	Huddersfield Giants	H	W	40-12	Frame, Viane (3), Finnigan, Millard, Smith	Myler 6/8	N/A	5,946	24. Holmes, 5. Emelio, 1. Connolly, 18. Fa'alogo, 28. Viane, 6. Craigie, 7. Myler, 8. O'Connor, 9. Millard, 12. Stankevitch, 11. Cassidy, 16. Frame, 13. Finnigan	10. O'Neill, 17. Mills, 33. O’Neill, 20. Smith	-
5/6/05	Leigh Centurions	A	W	14-34	Finnigan, Craigie (3), Millard	Myler 6/6, Connolly 1/1	N/A	5,170	33. O’Neill, 2. Manu, 1. Connolly, 18. Fa'alogo, 28. Viane, 6. Craigie, 7. Myler, 8. O'Connor, 9. Millard, 12. Stankevitch, 11. Cassidy, 16. Frame, 13. Finnigan	20. Smith, 10. O'Neill, 17. Mills, 24. Holmes	-
12/6/05	London Broncos	H	L	10-24	Connolly, Craigie	O’Neill 1/2	N/A	5.996	33. O’Neill, 5. Emelio, 1. Connolly, 18. Fa'alogo, 28. Viane, 6. Craigie, 7. Myler, 8. O'Connor, 9. Millard, 12. Stankevitch, 11. Cassidy, 15. Whitaker, 16. Frame	10. O'Neill, 17. Mills, 24. Holmes, 20. Smith	-
19/5/05	Bradford Bulls	A	D	25-25	Hulse, Connolly, Craigie, Emelio	O’Neill 4/5	N/A	10,715	14. Hulse, 5. Emelio, 1. Connolly, 18. Fa'alogo, 28. Viane, 33. O’Neill, 6. Craigie, 8. O'Connor, 9. Millard, 12. Stankevitch, 11. Cassidy, 15. Whitaker, 16. Frame	7. Myler, 17. Mills, 10. O'Neill, 20. Smith	-
3/7/05	Warrington	H	L	24-25	Emelio, Viane (2), O'Neill	O’Neill 4/6	N/A	9,825	24. Holmes, 5. Emelio, 21. Whittle, 18. Fa'alogo, 28. Viane, 6. Craigie, 33. O’Neill, 8. O'Connor, 20. Smith, 12. Stankevitch, 11. Cassidy, 16. Frame, 13. Finnigan	10. O'Neill, 17. Mills, 7. Myler, 15. Whitaker	-
8/7/05	Salford City Reds	A	L	34-16	Whittle, Finnigan, Viane	O’Neill 2/3	N/A	4,507	24. Holmes, 5. Emelio, 18. Fa'alogo, 21. Whittle, 28. Viane, 6. Craigie, 33. O’Neill, 8. O'Connor, 20. Smith, 12. Stankevitch, 11. Cassidy, 9. Millard, 13. Finnigan	14. Hulse, 15. Whitaker, 16. Frame, 17. Mills	-
17/7/05	Wakefield Trinity Wildcats	H	L	18-44	Viane (3), Fa'alogo	O’Neill 1/4	N/A	6,116	24. Holmes, 5. Emelio, 21. Whittle, 18. Fa'alogo, 28. Viane, 33. O’Neill, 14. Hulse, 8. O'Connor, 9. Millard, 12. Stankevitch, 11. Cassidy, 16. Frame, 13. Finnigan	10. O'Neill, 20. Smith, 7. Myler, 15. Whitaker	-
24/7/05	Hull F.C.	H	L	20-40	Hughes, Millard, Viane (2), Frame	Myler 0/5	N/A	5,378	24. Holmes, 5. Emelio, 21. Whittle, 4. Hughes, 28. Viane, 7. Myler, 33. O’Neill, 8. O'Connor, 9. Millard, 10. O'Neill, 11. Cassidy, 16. Frame, 13. Finnigan	15. Whitaker, 20. Smith, 17. Mills, 18. Fa'alogo	-
7/8/05	Bradford Bulls	A	L	74-24	Finnigan, Hughes, Smith, Viane	O’Neill 2/3, Myler 2/2	N/A	10,128	35. Watts, 5. Emelio, 21. Whittle, 4. Hughes, 28. Viane, 33. O’Neill, 36. Kerr, 8. O'Connor, 20. Smith, 10. O'Neill, 11. Cassidy, 16. Frame, 13. Finnigan	15. Whitaker, 7. Myler, 17. Mills, 12. Stankevitch	-
14/8/05	Wigan Warriors	H	L	24-48	Kerr, Myler, Hughes, Watts	Myler 4/4	N/A	6,384	35. Watts, 4. Hughes, 1. Connolly, 21. Whittle, 28. Viane, 7. Myler, 36. Kerr, 8. O'Connor, 20. Smith, 10. O'Neill, 11. Cassidy, 25. Nash, 13. Finnigan	33. O’Neill, 14. Hulse, 17. Mills, 31. Alcock	-
21/8/05	Warrington Wolves	H	L	16-60	Hughes, Kerr, Finnigan	Myler 2/3	N/A	7,876	33. O’Neill, 35. Watts, 1. Connolly, 4. Hughes, 28. Viane, 7. Myler, 36. Kerr, 10. O'Neill, 20. Smith, 25. Nash, 11. Cassidy, 16. Frame, 13. Finnigan	5. Emelio, 15. Whitaker, 17. Mills, 31. Alcock	-
4/9/05	Wakefield Trinity Wildcats	A	L	46-6	Myler	Myler 1/1	N/A	3,324	35. Watts, 5. Emelio, 1. Connolly, 4. Hughes, 28. Viane, 7. Myler, 36. Kerr, 25. Nash, 20. Smith, 10. O'Neill, 11. Cassidy, 16. Frame, 33. O’Neill	13. Finnigan, 15. Whitaker, 24. Holmes, 17. Mills	-
11/9/05	Leigh Centurions	H	W	36-20	Ballard (2), Connolly, O’Neill, Watts, Finnigan	Myler 6/6	N/A	5,293	35. Watts, 23. Ballard, 1. Connolly, 4. Hughes, 28. Viane, 7. Myler, 36. Kerr, 8. O'Connor, 20. Smith, 10. O'Neill, 13. Finnigan, 16. Frame, 33. O’Neill	25. Nash, 15. Whitaker, 17. Mills, 24. Holmes	-
17/9/05	London Broncos	A	L	68-10	Alcock, Watts	O’Neill 1/2	N/A	3,885	19. Rowlands, 23. Ballard, 1. Connolly, 4. Hughes, 28. Viane, 35. Watts, 36. Kerr, O'Connor, 27. Crook, 25. Nash, 16. Frame, 13. Finnigan, 33. O’Neill	5. Emelio, 31. Alcock, Johnson, Woods	-

=== 2005 Challenge Cup Results ===
Date	Vrs	H/A	Result	Score	Tries	Goals	Field goals	Att	Lineup	Subs	
3/4/05	Swinton Lions	H	W	32-18	Frame (2), Manu (2), Cassidy, Holmes	Crook 3/5, Rowlands 1/1	N/A	2,263	24. Holmes, 19. Rowlands, 5. Emelio, 3. Moule, 2. Manu, 27. Crook, 14. Hulse, 15. Whitaker, 20. Smith, 17. Mills, 11. Cassidy, 16. Frame, 13. Finnigan	25. Nash, 18. Fa'alogo, 31. Alcock, 32. Gill	-
8/5/05	Barrow Raiders	A	W	8-50	Mills, Myler, Holmes, Whitaker (2), Manu, Hughes, Fa'alogo, Hulse	Myler 7/9	N/A	2,599	24. Holmes, 2. Manu, 3. Moule, 4. Hughes, 5. Emelio, 6. Craigie, 7. Myler, 17. Mills, 9. Millard, 10. O'Neill, 18. Fa'alogo, 16. Frame, 13. Finnigan	14. Hulse, 15. Whitaker, 20. Smith, 19. Rowlands (Not Used)	-
26/6/05	Toulouse Olympique	A	L	40-24	Emelio, Johnson, Smith, Manu	Myler 4/4	N/A	4,500	14. Hulse, 2. Manu, 1. Connolly, 4. Hughes, 5. Emelio, 6. Craigie, 7. Myler, 8. O'Connor, 9. Millard, 10. O'Neill, 11. Cassidy, 15. Whitaker, 16. Frame	20. Smith, 17. Mills, 24. Holmes, 34. Johnson	-
