= 2005 Super League season =

British rugby league season

Super League X
- League: Super League
- Duration: 28 Rounds
- Teams: 12
- Highest attendance: 25,004; Wigan Warriors vs St. Helens (25 March)
- Lowest attendance: 2,682; Salford City Reds vs Huddersfield Giants (2 July)
- Total attendance: 1,492,464 ▲ (average 8,884)
- Broadcast partners: Sky Sports

2005 Season
- Champions: Bradford Bulls; 4th Super League title 6th British title
- League Leaders: St. Helens
- Man of Steel: (Australia) Jamie Lyon
- Top point-scorer: (England) Paul Deacon (322)
- Top try-scorer: (Tonga) Lesley Vainikolo (32)

New franchise
- Awarded to: Catalans Dragons

Promotion and relegation
- Promoted from National League One: Castleford Tigers
- Relegated to National League One: Leigh Centurions; Widnes Vikings

Super League X is the official name of 2005's Super League season. It was the 10th season of the Super League and saw twelve teams from across England compete for the premiership. The season kicked off in early February, culminating in a six team play-off series

The Grand Final, held at Old Trafford on 15 October, saw Bradford Bulls crowned Champions. The Grand Final was the final match of a which itself was the climax of a league season that kicked off in early February.

== Season summary ==
Either one or two teams were to be relegated from the league at the end of the season in order to make way for new entrants. The bottom team were certain to be relegated, in order to allow in French club Catalans Dragons. The second bottom team would only be relegated if the winner of National League One met the criteria for Super League entry. On the 3 October the Rugby Football League announced that both finalists in this competition, Castleford Tigers and Whitehaven were eligible for promotion, hence two teams were relegated.

The season was a commercial success, with a rise in average crowd size for the regular rounds of 8,887, continuing the trend of rises every year since 2001. This is the first time in the history of Super League the Grand Final has not included the league leader at the end of the regular season: St Helens were knocked out by Bradford Bulls in the semi-final.

== Table ==
Pos	Team	Pld	W	D	L	PF	PA	PD	Pts	Qualification
1	St Helens (L)	28	23	1	4	1028	537	+491	47	Semi Final
2	Leeds Rhinos	28	22	0	6	1152	505	+647	44	Semi Final
3	Bradford Bulls (C)	28	18	1	9	1038	684	+354	37	Elimination Semi Final
4	Warrington Wolves	28	18	0	10	792	702	+90	36	Elimination Semi Final
5	Hull F.C.	28	15	2	11	756	670	+86	32	Elimination Semi Final
6	London Broncos	28	13	2	13	800	718	+82	28	Elimination Semi Final
7	Wigan Warriors	28	14	0	14	698	718	−20	28	
8	Huddersfield Giants	28	12	0	16	742	791	−49	24	
9	Salford City Reds	28	11	0	17	549	732	−183	22	
10	Wakefield Trinity Wildcats	28	10	0	18	716	999	−283	20	
11	Widnes Vikings (R)	28	6	1	21	598	1048	−450	13	Relegation to National League One
12	Leigh Centurions (R)	28	2	1	25	445	1210	−765	5	Relegation to National League One

Source: Rugby League Project
Rules for classification: 1) Points; 2) Points difference; 3) Number of points scored;
(C) Champions; (L) League Leaders' Shield Winners; (R) Relegated

== Play-off ==
Elimination play-offs
3	Bradford Bulls	44
6	London Broncos	22
4	Warrington Wolves	6
5	Hull F.C.	40

Qualifying / elimination semi-finals
1	St. Helens	16
2	Leeds Rhinos	19
Bradford Bulls	71
Hull F.C.	0

Elimination final
St. Helens	18
Bradford Bulls	23

Grand Final
Leeds Rhinos	6
Bradford Bulls	15

=== Grand final ===
- 15 October: Leeds Rhinos 6-15 Bradford Bulls

== 2005 Transfers ==
=== Players ===
Player	2004 Club	2005 Club
Paul Anderson	Bradford Bulls	St. Helens
Toa Kohe-Love	Bradford Bulls	Warrington Wolves
Logan Swann	Bradford Bulls	Warrington Wolves
Tevita Vaikona	Bradford Bulls	Saracens F.C. (English rugby union)
Ryan Clayton	Castleford Tigers	Huddersfield Giants
Damian Gibson	Castleford Tigers	Halifax (National League One)
Wayne Godwin	Castleford Tigers	Wigan Warriors
Craig Greenhill	Castleford Tigers	Retirement
Lee Harland	Castleford Tigers	Doncaster Dragons (National League One)
Paul Jackson	Castleford Tigers	Huddersfield Giants
Andy Lynch	Castleford Tigers	Bradford Bulls
Paul Mellor	Castleford Tigers	NRL: Cronulla-Sutherland Sharks
Paul Newlove	Castleford Tigers	Retirement
Sean Ryan	Castleford Tigers	Retirement
Tommy Saxton	Castleford Tigers	Hull F.C.
Ryan Sheridan	Castleford Tigers	Retirement
Michael Smith	Castleford Tigers	Hull Kingston Rovers (National League One)
Nathan Sykes	Castleford Tigers	Featherstone Rovers (National League One)
Jamie Thackray	Castleford Tigers	Hull F.C.
Mark Tookey	Castleford Tigers	London Broncos
Ben Cooper	Huddersfield Giants	Leigh Centurions
Brandon Costin	Huddersfield Giants	Retirement
Darren Fleary	Huddersfield Giants	Leigh Centurions
Darren Turner	Huddersfield Giants	Retirement
Richie Barnett	Hull F.C.	Retirement
Colin Best	Hull F.C.	NRL: St. George Illawarra Dragons
Jason Smith	Hull F.C.	NRL: Canberra Raiders
Matt Adamson	Leeds Rhinos	NRL: Canberra Raiders
David Furner	Leeds Rhinos	Retirement
Russell Bawden	London Broncos	Retirement
Jim Dymock	London Broncos	Retirement
Rob Jackson	London Broncos	Leigh Centurions
Dennis Moran	London Broncos	Wigan Warriors
Steele Retchless	London Broncos	Retirement
Nigel Roy	London Broncos	Retirement
Mat Toshack	London Broncos	Retirement
Joel Caine	Salford City Reds	Retirement
Gavin Clinch	Salford City Reds	Retirement
Jason Flowers	Salford City Reds	Retirement
Martin Moana	Salford City Reds	Doncaster Dragons (National League One)
Scott Naylor	Salford City Reds	Retirement
Martin Gleeson	St. Helens	Warrington Wolves
Chris Joynt	St. Helens	Retirement
John Stankevitch	St. Helens	Widnes Vikings
Gareth Ellis	Wakefield Trinity Wildcats	Leeds Rhinos
Darren Burns	Warrington Wolves	Retirement
Mike Forshaw	Warrington Wolves	Retirement
Jérôme Guisset	Warrington Wolves	Wigan Warriors
Gary Hulse	Warrington Wolves	Widnes Vikings
Ian Sibbit	Warrington Wolves	Salford City Reds
Paul Atcheson	Widnes Vikings	Retirement
Deon Bird	Widnes Vikings	Castleford Tigers (National League One)
Andy Hay	Widnes Vikings	Doncaster Dragons (National League One)
Steve McCurrie	Widnes Vikings	Leigh Centurions
Robert Relf	Widnes Vikings	Retirement
Mick Cassidy	Wigan Warriors	Widnes Vikings
Gary Connolly	Wigan Warriors	Widnes Vikings
Andy Farrell	Wigan Warriors	Saracens F.C. (English rugby union)
David Hodgson	Wigan Warriors	Salford City Reds
Adrian Lam	Wigan Warriors	Retirement
Terry O'Connor	Wigan Warriors	Widnes Vikings
Quentin Pongia	Wigan Warriors	Retirement
Luke Robinson	Wigan Warriors	Salford City Reds
Craig Smith	Wigan Warriors	NRL: Newcastle Knights
Mark Smith	Wigan Warriors	Widnes Vikings
Michael De Vere	NRL: Brisbane Broncos	Huddersfield Giants
Brad Meyers	NRL: Brisbane Broncos	Bradford Bulls
Brad Drew	NRL: Canberra Raiders	Huddersfield Giants
Mark McLinden	NRL: Canberra Raiders	London Broncos
Ben Harris	NRL: Canterbury-Bankstown Bulldogs	Bradford Bulls
Jason Kent	NRL: Cronulla-Sutherland Sharks	Leigh Centurions
Nick Bradley-Qalilawa	NRL: Manly Warringah Sea Eagles	London Broncos
Solomon Haumono	NRL: Manly Warringah Sea Eagles	London Broncos
Stephen Kearney	NRL: Melbourne Storm	Hull F.C.
Danny Williams	NRL: Melbourne Storm	London Broncos
Vinnie Anderson	NRL: New Zealand Warriors	St. Helens
Henry Fa'afili	NRL: New Zealand Warriors	Warrington Wolves
Jerry Seuseu	NRL: New Zealand Warriors	Wigan Warriors
Lee Hopkins	NRL: Parramatta Eels	London Broncos
Junior Langi	NRL: Parramatta Eels	Salford City Reds
Jamie Lyon	NRL: Parramatta Eels	St. Helens
Craig Stapleton	NRL: Parramatta Eels	Leigh Centurions
Chris Thorman	NRL: Parramatta Eels	Huddersfield Giants
David Vaealiki	NRL: Parramatta Eels	Wigan Warriors
Owen Craigie	NRL: South Sydney Rabbitohs	Widnes Vikings
Brad Watts	NRL: South Sydney Rabbitohs	Widnes Vikings
Nathan Blacklock	NRL: St. George Illawarra Dragons	Hull F.C.
Luke Dorn	NRL: Sydney Roosters	London Broncos
Robert Mears	NRL: Wests Tigers	Leigh Centurions
Jason Ferris	N/A	Leigh Centurions
