= List of Widnes Vikings coaches =

Widnes Vikings coaches (1964 - today)

This is a list of Widnes Vikings coaches since the 1964 season to present.

| Name | Nationality | From | To | Record | | | | | | |
| Name | Nationality | From | To | P | W | D | L | F | A | W% |
|---|---|---|---|---|---|---|---|---|---|---|
| Thomas Shannon | England | 1949 | 195? | - | - | - | - | - | - | - |
| Joe Egan | England | 1964 | 1964 | - | - | - | - | - | - | - |
| Vince Karalius | England | Jan 1972 | May 1975 | - | - | - | - | - | - | - |
| Frank Myler | England | May 1975 | May 1978 | - | - | - | - | - | - | - |
| Doug Laughton | England | May 1978 | May 1983 | - | - | - | - | - | - | - |
| Colin Tyrer | England | Mar 1983 | May 1983 | - | - | - | - | - | - | - |
| Harry Dawson | England | May 1983 | Mar 1984 | - | - | - | - | - | - | - |
| Vince Karalius | England | Mar 1984 | May 1984 | - | - | - | - | - | - | - |
| Eric Hughes | England | Jun 1984 | Jan 1986 | - | - | - | - | - | - | - |
| Doug Laughton | England | Jan 1986 | May 1991 | - | - | - | - | - | - | - |
| Frank Myler | England | Jun 1991 | May 1992 | - | - | - | - | - | - | - |
| Phil Larder | England | May 1992 | May 1994 | - | - | - | - | - | - | - |
| Tony Myler | England | May 1994 | Aug 1995 | - | - | - | - | - | - | - |
| Doug Laughton | England | Aug 1995 | May 1997 | - | - | - | - | - | - | - |
| Graeme West | New Zealand | May 1997 | Aug 1998 | - | - | - | - | - | - | - |
| Colin Whitfield | England | Aug 1998 | Mar 2000 | - | - | - | - | - | - | - |
| David Hulme | England | Mar 2000 | Mar 2001 | - | - | - | - | - | - | - |
| Neil Kelly | England | Mar 2001 | Jul 2004 | - | - | - | - | - | - | - |
| Stuart Spruce (caretaker) | England | Jul 2004 | Oct 2004 | - | - | - | - | - | - | - |
| Frank Endacott | New Zealand | Oct 2004 | Oct 2005 | - | - | - | - | - | - | - |
| Steve McCormack | Scotland | Oct 2005 | Feb 2009 | - | - | - | - | - | - | - |
| John Stankevitch (caretaker) | England | Feb 2009 | Mar 2009 | - | - | - | - | - | - | - |
| Paul Cullen | England | Mar 2009 | Nov 2010 | 20 | 11 | 0 | 9 | 649 | 438 | .55 |
| Denis Betts | England | Nov 2010 | May 2018 | - | - | - | - | - | - | - |
| Francis Cummins (interim) | England Ireland | May 2018 | Oct 2018 | - | - | - | - | - | - | - |
| Kieron Purtill | England | Nov 2018 | Oct 2019 | - | - | - | - | - | - | - |
| Tim Sheens | Australia | Oct 2019 | Oct 2020 | - | - | - | - | - | - | - |
| Simon Finnigan | Ireland | Nov 2020 | Apr 2022 | - | - | - | - | - | - | - |
| Ryan O'Brien (Interim) | England | Apr 2022 | Jun 2022 | - | - | - | - | - | - | - |
| John Kear | England | Jul 2022 | Jun 2023 | - | - | - | - | - | - | - |
| Neil Belshaw (Interim) | England | June 2023 | Sep 2023 | - | - | - | - | - | - | - |
| Allan Coleman | England | Oct 2023 | Present | - | - | - | - | - | - | - |

Source: rugby.widnes.tv.
Win Percentage is worked out as number of wins, divided by total number of games.
Table currently only lists records from league games.

== History ==
On 16 February 2009 Widnes declared that they had parted company with coach Steve McCormack, through 'mutual consent'. The news came 3 days after Widnes were controversially beaten 22-20 at home to Co-Operative Championship 1 side Oldham in the Northern Rail Cup Stage. Vikings' chairman Steve O'Connor was quick to announce that the decision wasn't made on the back of the Oldham defeat alone. John Stankevitch was appointed as caretaker coach after McCormacks exit from the club.

Paul Cullen was appointed as Head Coach on 8 March 2009, Cullen first aided John Stankevitch in his final game as caretaker coach, beating French side Toulouse Olympique 70-0 in the first game of the 2009 Co-operative Championship.

Cullen had a successful first season with the Vikings, finishing in 4th position in the 2009 Co-operative Championship and winning the 2009 Northern Rail Cup.
