= Dwayne West =

English rugby league footballer

Personal information
- Full name: Dwayne West
- Born: 6 August 1980 (age 45); Taranaki, New Zealand

Playing information
- Position: Wing
Club
Years	Team	Pld	T	G	FG	P
1999	Wigan Warriors	3	0	0	0	0
2000–02	St. Helens	28	6	0	0	24
2003	Hull FC	1	0	0	0	0
	Total	32	6	0	0	24
- Father: Graeme West

Dwayne West (born 8 June 1980) is a former professional rugby league footballer who played in the 2000s. He played in the Super League for St. Helens, Wigan Warriors and Hull FC as a winger. He is the son of former Wigan player and coach Graeme West.

== Playing career ==
West started his career at Wigan, débuting in 1999 and making three appearances before moving to St Helens in June 2000. He remained at St. Helens for two years before joining Hull FC in 2003. However, on his début for Hull F.C. he sustained a serious knee injury and was subsequently forced to retire from the sport.

=== "Wide to West" ===
He is most remembered for his time at St Helens for his role in arguably the most famous try in Super League history - Chris Joynt's try in the Qualifying Playoff at Knowsley Road vs. Bradford Bulls on 22 September 2000. With the Bulls leading 11-10, the clock was up and there was one last play for St Helens to score; if the ball went dead the game would finish. After the ball had been passed back and forth on the right hand side by the St Helens players, there was no way through. Sean Long switched the play left where he found West, who ran forward and beat two Bulls players before passing the ball inside to Joynt to score a dramatic try at the death. The try soon became known as the 'Wide to West' try, named after the memorable commentary by Eddie Hemmings:

Sculthorpe wants to get on with it, Bradford counting down, this is the last play! Long, kicks it wide, to Iro. Iro… to Hall. Hall is trapped. Back it goes… to Hoppe, over the shoulder to Hall. There is Jonkers, here is Long. And Long fancies it, Long fancies it! It's wide to West, it's wide to West! Dwayne West! Inside to Joynt! Joynt, Joynt, Joooynt! Oh! Oh! Fantastic! They've won it, they've won it!

— Commentator Eddie Hemmings, Sky Sports
