= Joseph Lyons (disambiguation) =

Joseph Lyons (1879–1939) was an Australian prime minister.

Joseph or Joe Lyons may also refer to:

- Joseph Lyons (caterer) (1847–1917), co-founder of J. Lyons and Co.
- Dennis Lyons or Joe Lyons (1916–2011), British scientist
- Joseph M. Lyons (born 1951), Illinois state representative
- Joe Lyons (rugby league) (born 1997), English rugby league footballer
- Joe Lyons (footballer) (1914–1993), Australian rules footballer

== See also ==
- Lyons (surname)
