= Chris Caruana =

Australian rugby league footballer

Personal information
- Born: 18 March 1971 (age 55)

Playing information
- Position: Centre
Club
Years	Team	Pld	T	G	FG	P
1992–97	North Sydney Bears	108	38	0	0	152
1998–02	South Sydney	49	6	0	0	24
	Total	157	44	0	0	176

Chris Caruana (born 18 March 1971) is an Australian former professional rugby league footballer. He played for the North Sydney Bears and the South Sydney Rabbitohs. He primarily played in the centres.

== Playing career ==
Growing up in public housing in Millers Point, Caruana began as Balmain junior playing for the Pyrmont Colts club. He then later played for the North Sydney junior club Brothers, from where he was graded by the Bears. Caruana made his first-grade debut on 12 April 1992 during round 4 against the Western Suburbs Magpies. Norths went on to lose the match 26–16. Caruana's breakout year was the 1994 NSWRL season where he made 22 appearances and scored 5 tries. He was in the team that made it all the way to the preliminary final but lost the match to eventual premiers Canberra Raiders. Caruana was also part of the North Sydney sides which experienced preliminary final heartbreak in 1996 and 1997. During the 1997 season, Caruana was fined and dropped from first grade as he was accused by then Newcastle player Owen Craigie of racially abusing him in a match. At the end of the season, Caruana signed with Souths.

Caruana played with Souths during the 1998 and 1999 seasons before they were kicked out of the competition. In 2002, Caruana made his comeback to rugby league for South Sydney after they were reinstated in the competition. During his time away, Caruana worked at Flemington fruit markets, as a bricklayer and a personal trainer to professional surfers. At the end of the 2002 season, Caruana was released by Souths.

== Post playing ==
After retiring from first-grade rugby league, Caruana moved to Woolgoolga and had some involvement in country rugby league in the town. On 21 May 2010, Caruana pleaded guilty to assault in relation to his former partner. Released on conditional bail, Caruana was to reappear in the Coffs Harbour Local Court to be sentenced on 21 July 2010.

In 2012, Caruana was reported as living homeless after years of suffering from borderline personality disorder. In January 2023, Caruana revealed his battle with methamphetamine addiction and being homeless, and that he has been sober for 33 months.
