= 2000 Super League Grand Final =

Wigan Warriors	St. Helens
16	29
	1	2	Total
WIG	4	12	16
ST H	11	18	29
- Date: 14 October 2000
- Stadium: Old Trafford
- Location: (England) Manchester
- Harry Sunderland Trophy: (England) Chris Joynt ( St Helens)
- Referee: Russell Smith
- Attendance: 58,132

Broadcast partners
- Broadcasters: Sky Sports
- Commentators: Eddie Hemmings; Mike Stephenson

The 2000 Super League Grand Final was the third official grand final and the conclusive and championship-deciding game of 2000's Super League V. Held on Saturday 14 October 2000 at Old Trafford, Manchester, the game was played between St. Helens and Wigan Warriors. Wigan wore blue for the encounter and St Helens wore their traditional red and white. The match was refereed by Russell Smith of Castleford and played before a crowd of 58,132. In the end St Helens, inspired by their captain Chris Joynt, defeated Wigan Warriors 29–16.

== Background ==
Tetleys Super League V reverted to 12 teams after Gateshead Thunder and Sheffield Eagles left the league although Huddersfield Giants subsequently became Huddersfield-Sheffield Giants and finished bottom for the third consecutive season. Wigan Warriors finished top for the first time since Super League III when they won the Grand Final.

	Team	Pld	W	D	L	PF	PA	PD	Pts
1	Wigan Warriors	28	24	1	3	960	405	+555	49
2	St. Helens	28	23	0	5	988	627	+361	46

=== Route to the Final ===
==== Wigan Warriors ====
Wigan
Round	Opposition	Score
Qualifying Semi-Final	St Helens (H)	54–16
Final Eliminator	Bradford Bulls (H)	40-12
Key: (H) = Home venue; (A) = Away venue.

==== St Helens ====
St Helens
Round	Opposition	Score
Qualifying Play-off	Bradford Bulls (H)	16-11
Qualifying Semi-Final	Wigan Warriors (A)	54–16
Key: (H) = Home venue; (A) = Away venue.

== Match details ==
14 October 2000

Wigan Warriors	16 - 29	St. Helens
Tries: Andy Farrell, Dave Hodgson, Tony Smith; Goals: Andy Farrell (2)		Tries: Sean Hoppe, Chris Joynt (2), Fereti Tuilagi, Tim Jonkers; Goals: Sean Long (4); Drop Goals Paul Sculthorpe

Old Trafford, Manchester
Attendance: 58,132
Referee: Russell Smith (Castleford)

St Helens		Position	Wigan Warriors	
1	(England) Paul Wellens	Fullback	1	(England) Jason Robinson
2	(England) Steve Hall	Winger	2	(Australia) Brett Dallas
3	(New Zealand) Kevin Iro	Centre	3	(England) Kris Radlinski
	(New Zealand) Sean Hoppe	Centre		(Australia) Steve Renouf
5	(England) Anthony Sullivan	Winger	5	(England) David Hodgson
6	(England) Tommy Martyn	Stand Off	6	(England) Tony Smith
	(England) Sean Long	Scrum half		(Australia) Willie Peters
	(New Zealand) Apollo Perelini	Prop		(Ireland) Terry O'Connor
9	(England) Keiron Cunningham	Hooker	9	(England) Terry Newton
	(New Zealand) Julian O'Neill	Prop		(England) Neil Cowie
	(Netherlands) Tim Jonkers	2nd Row		(Ireland) Mick Cassidy
	(England) Chris Joynt	2nd Row		(England) Denis Betts
	(England) Paul Sculthorpe	Loose forward		(England) Andy Farrell
	(Samoa) Fereti Tuilagi	Interchange		(England) Lee Gilmour
	(England) Scott Barrow	Interchange		(England) Chris Chester
	(England) John Stankevitch	Interchange		(Australia) Tony Mestrov
	(England) Sonny Nickle	Interchange		(New Zealand) Brady Malam
		Coach		(New Zealand) Frank Endacott
