= Reg Higgins =

British Lions & England international rugby union player (1930-1979)

- Born: 11 July 1930 Widnes, Cheshire, England
- Died: 1979 (aged 48–49) Frodsham, Cheshire, England
- Notable relative(s): Alec Higgins (father), Fred Higgins (uncle)

Rugby union career
- Position: Flanker
Senior career
Years	Team	Apps	(Points)
–	Liverpool		
International career
Years	Team	Apps	(Points)
1954-1959	England		
1955	British & Irish Lions		

Reginald "Reg" Higgins (11 July 1930, in Widnes – 1979 (aged 48–49) , in Frodsham) was a British international rugby union player.

He was born in Widnes, Lancashire and played as a flanker for Liverpool rugby club. He was capped thirteen times for England between 1954 and 1959. He also took part in the British Lions tour of South Africa, playing in the first test match. Although the Lions won the game 23-22, Higgins was carried off the field with a broken leg.
