= Ian Hughes (rugby league) =

English rugby league footballer

Personal information
- Born: 13 March 1972 (age 53); Leeds, England

Playing information
- Position: Second-row
Club
Years	Team	Pld	T	G	FG	P
1992–96	Sheffield Eagles
1997–98	Wakefield Trinity	44	6	0	0	24
1999	Hull Kingston Rovers	29	5	0	0	20
2000–01	Keighley Cougars	48	20	0	0	80
2001	Dewsbury Rams	11	1	0	0	4
2002	Gateshead Thunder	7	2	0	0	8
2003	Hunslet	1	0	0	0	0
	Total	140	34	0	0	136
Representative
Years	Team	Pld	T	G	FG	P
1993	Great Britain U-21	1	1	0	0	4
- Relatives: Adam Hughes (brother)

Ian Robert Hughes (born 13 March 1972) is an English former professional rugby league footballer who played in the 1990s and 2000s. He played at club level for the Sheffield Eagles, Wakefield Trinity, Hull Kingston Rovers, the Keighley Cougars, the Dewsbury Rams, Gateshead Thunder and Hunslet, as a second-row.

== Background ==
Ian Hughes was born in Leeds, West Riding of Yorkshire, and after his rugby league career he became a police officer.

== Genealogical Information ==
Ian Hughes is the older brother of the rugby league footballer; Adam Hughes.
