= Harry Young (rugby league) =

England international rugby league footballer (born 1899)

Personal information
- Full name: Harry Young
- Born: 7 May 1899

Playing information
- Position: Wing
Club
Years	Team	Pld	T	G	FG	P
1916–25	Widnes	180	77	2	0	235
1925–27	Halifax
1927–28	Bradford Northern
	Total	180	77	2	0	235
Representative
Years	Team	Pld	T	G	FG	P
1925	England	1	1	0	0	3

Harry Young was an English professional rugby league footballer who played in the 1910s and 1920s. He played at representative level for England, and at club level for Widnes, Halifax and Bradford Northern, as a wing.

== Playing career ==
=== Club career ===
Harry Young made his début for Widnes during the 1916-17 season, and he played his last match for Widnes during the 1925-26 season. Harry Young played in Widnes' victory in the Lancashire County League during the 1919-20 season.

In October 1925, Young transferred to Halifax for a fee of £400. He was sold back to Widnes two years later for a fee of £25, but was transfer listed a couple of months later without making an appearance for the club. He was signed by Bradford Northern in December 1927.

=== International honours ===
Harry Young won a cap for England while at Widnes, he played on the wing, and scored a try in the 27–22 victory over Wales at Workington on Saturday 7 February 1925.

== Post-playing ==
During the mid-1930s, Young was a coach at the short-lived rugby league clubs Acton and Willesden and Newcastle, and was later appointed as an assistant at St Helens.
