= Jimmy Hoey =

England international rugby league footballer

Personal information
- Full name: James Edward Hoey
- Born: 5 May 1901; Widnes, Lancashire
- Died: 3 May 1988 (aged 86); Halton General Hospital, Runcorn, Cheshire

Playing information
- Position: Centre, Second-row
Club
Years	Team	Pld	T	G	FG	P
1922–34	Widnes	308	101	395	0	1093
Representative
Years	Team	Pld	T	G	FG	P
1930	Lancashire	1	0	0	0	0
1930	England	1	2	5	0	16

James Edward Hoey (5 May 1901 – 3 May 1988) was an English professional rugby league footballer who played in the 1920s and 1930s. He played at representative level for England, and at club level for Widnes, as a goal-kicking centre, or second-row.

== Playing career ==
=== Club career ===
Hoey played in Widnes' 10–3 victory over St. Helens in the 1929–30 Challenge Cup Final during the 1929–30 season at Wembley Stadium, London on Saturday 3 May 1930 in front of a crowd of 36,544.

Hoey played loose forward, and scored a goal in Widnes' 4–5 defeat by Wigan in the 1928–29 Lancashire Cup Final during the 1928–29 season at Wilderspool Stadium, Warrington on Saturday 24 November 1928.

In the 1932–33 season, Jimmy Hoey became the first player from any club to play and score in every game during a season, this record was equalled by William "Billy" Langton of Hunslet in the 1958–59 season.

=== Representative honours ===
Hoey won a cap for England while at Widnes in 1930 against Other Nationalities.

Hoey won cap(s) for Lancashire while at Widnes during the 1930–31 season.

== Honoured at Widnes ==
Jimmy Hoey is a Widnes Hall Of Fame Inductee.

== Genealogical information ==
Jimmy Hoey is the brother of the rugby league footballer who played in the 1930s and 1940s for Widnes; William Hoey.
