= Alec Higgins =

Great Britain and England international rugby league footballer

Personal information
- Full name: Alec Higgins
- Born: fourth ¼ 1908 Prescot district, England
- Died: third ¼ 1965 (aged 56) Widnes district, England

Playing information
- Position: Centre, Prop, Second-row, Loose forward
Club
Years	Team	Pld	T	G	FG	P
1926–46	Widnes	312	38	0	0	114
Representative
Years	Team	Pld	T	G	FG	P
1937–37	Lancashire	1	0	0	0	0
1937	British Empire	1	0	0	0	0
1936–39	England	6	0	0	0	0
1937	Great Britain	2	0	0	0	0
- Relatives: Reg Higgins (son); Fred Higgins (brother)

Alec Higgins (birth registered fourth ¼ 1908 – third ¼ 1965) was an English professional rugby league footballer who played in the 1920s, 1930s and 1940s. He played at representative level for Great Britain, England, British Empire and Lancashire, and at club level for Widnes, as a centre, prop, second-row, or loose forward.

== Background ==
Higgins' birth was registered in Prescot district, Lancashire, and his death aged 56 was registered in Widnes district, Lancashire, England.

== Playing career ==
=== Challenge Cup Final appearances ===
Higgins played in Widnes' 18-5 victory over Keighley in the 1936–37 Challenge Cup Final during the 1936–37 season at Wembley Stadium, London on Saturday 8 May 1937.

=== County Cup Final appearances ===
Higgins played at centre in Widnes' 4-5 defeat by Wigan in the 1928–29 Lancashire Cup Final during the 1928–29 season at Wilderspool Stadium, Warrington on Saturday 24 November 1928, played at prop in Widnes' 7-3 victory over Wigan in the 1945–46 Lancashire Cup Final during the 1945–46 season at Wilderspool Stadium, Warrington on Saturday 27 October 1945.

=== International honours ===
Higgins represented for British Empire while at Widnes in 1937 against France, and won caps for England while at Widnes in 1936 against Wales, in 1937 against France, in 1938 against Wales, and France, in 1938 against Wales, in 1939 against France, and won caps for Great Britain while at Widnes in 1937 against Australia (2 matches).

== Personal life ==
Alec Higgins was the younger brother of the rugby league footballer; Jack Higgins, the older brother of the rugby league footballer; Fred Higgins and the father of rugby union footballer Reg Higgins.
