= Tim Jonkers =

Ireland international rugby league footballer

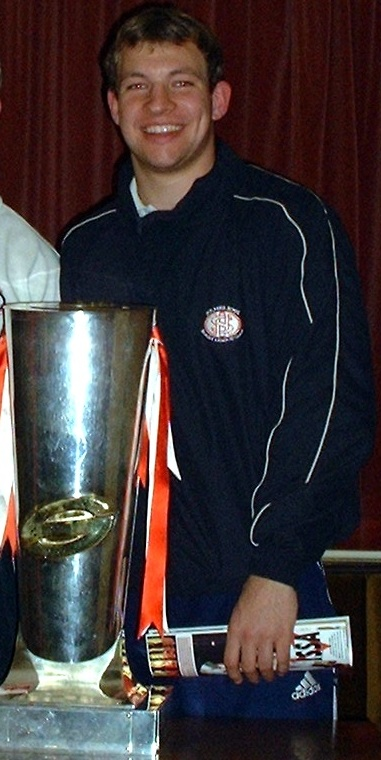

Personal information
- Born: 3 July 1981 (age 45) Amsterdam, Netherlands

Playing information
- Height: 6 ft 1 in (1.85 m)
- Weight: 15 st 2 lb (96 kg)
- Position: Second-row
Club
Years	Team	Pld	T	G	FG	P
1998–04	St Helens	122	17	0	0	68
2004–06	Salford City Reds	18	0	0	0	0
2006(loan)	→Wigan Warriors	4	0	0	0	0
2006–07	Leigh Centurions	9	1	0	0	4
	Total	153	18	0	0	72
Representative
Years	Team	Pld	T	G	FG	P
1999–01	Ireland	2	0	0	0	0
2001	Lancashire	1	0	0	0	0

Tim Jonkers (born 3 July 1981) is a former Ireland international rugby league footballer who played as a second-row forward in the 1990s and 2000s. He played his club football with St Helens, with whom he had Challenge Cup and Super League grand final success, as well as the Wigan Warriors, Salford City Reds and Leigh Centurions. He also represented Lancashire.

== Background ==
Jonkers was born in Amsterdam, Netherlands.

He moved to St. Helens at the age of six and was educated at Cowley High School. He began playing rugby at the local Blackbrook A.R.L.F.C., and was snapped up inevitably by St. Helens where he was hailed as one of Saints' brightest young hopes. Jonkers had two children after leaving his rugby career. Alex Jonkers and Charlie Jonkers.

He had 4 aunts until one died in 2012. His aunts are: Carmel, Mary and Angela. He has a brother, Martin Jonkers with a nephew, James Jonkers and a new born baby niece Imogen Jonkers. He has 5 cousins, Keith Rogan, Angla Rogan, Rebecca Lee, Roisin Lee and Jack Rogan.

== Playing career ==
Jonkers played for St. Helens at second-row and scored a try in their 2000 Super League Grand Final victory over the Wigan Warriors. As Super League V champions, St. Helens played against 2000 NRL Premiers, the Brisbane Broncos in the 2001 World Club Challenge. Jonkers played from the interchange bench in Saints' victory. He became a regular for many years at Saints and there are few players in the Super League that can brandish as much silverware as Jonkers since the formation of the summer era. Jonkers played for St. Helens at second-row in their 2002 Super League Grand Final victory against the Bradford Bulls. Having won Super League VI, St. Helens contested the 2003 World Club Challenge against 2002 NRL Premiers, the Sydney Roosters. Jonkers played from the interchange bench in Saints' 38–0 loss.

Jonkers' career at Knowsley Road fizzled out in 2004 mainly due to injury. Jonkers found it tough to gain his place back in the team and subsequently joined the Salford City Reds on loan, before completing a permanent deal in 2005. A recurrence of an injury to his knee, meant that Jonkers was forced to sit out most of his first season, and in March 2006, with first team opportunities scarce, he accepted a one-month loan deal with the Wigan Warriors to play under his former boss Ian Millward. On his return to the Salford City Reds, Leigh Centurions quickly stepped in to take Jonkers on loan till the end of the season. Yet again though, Jonkers' luck deserted him and a knee ligament injury ruled him out for several months. Jonkers signed a permanent deal with Leigh Centurions for the 2007 season in November 2006. The injury persisted though and Jonkers announced his retirement from rugby league on 11 June 2007.
