= Julian O'Neill (New Zealand rugby league) =

US international rugby league footballer

Personal information
- Full name: Julian O'Neill
- Born: 24 July 1973 (age 53) Auckland, New Zealand

Playing information
- Height: 188 cm (6 ft 2 in)
- Weight: 109 kg (17 st 2 lb)
- Position: Prop
Club
| Years | Team | Pld | T | G | FG | P |
|---|---|---|---|---|---|---|
| 1994–95 | Waitakere City |
| 1995–96 | Auckland Warriors | 16 | 0 | 0 | 0 | 0 |
| 1997–00 | St Helens | 126 | 5 | 0 | 0 | 20 |
| 2001–02 | Wakefield Trinity Wildcats | 25 | 2 | 0 | 0 | 8 |
| 2002–05 | Widnes Vikings | 96 | 4 | 1 | 0 | 18 |
| | Total | 263 | 11 | 1 | 0 | 46 |
Representative
| Years | Team | Pld | T | G | FG | P |
| 1999–00 | USA | 5 | 2 | 0 | 0 | 8 |

Julian O'Neill (born 24 July 1973) is a former United States international rugby league footballer who spent most of his career playing in the Super League. His position of preference was at prop.

== Background ==
O'Neill was born in Auckland, New Zealand.

== Early years ==
After attending Liston College, O'Neil started his career with the Marist Saints before making the Waitakere City Raiders side in the Lion Red Cup.

He was an Auckland Warrior 1995-1996 where he played a crucial role in laying a platform for the reserve grade to reach the 1996 grand final.

== Playing career ==
=== St Helens ===
In 1997 O'Neill moved to England and joined the St. Helens in the Super League competition where he gained the club's highest tackler and most offloads in the 1997 season. He played for St. Helens at prop forward in their 1999 Super League Grand Final victory over Bradford Bulls.

O'Neill went on to play in 126 games for the Saints, including being involved in the side that won the 1997 Challenge Cup and 1999's Super League IV title. Having won the 1999 Championship, St. Helens contested in the 2000 World Club Challenge against National Rugby League Premiers the Melbourne Storm, with O'Neill playing at prop forward in the loss. O'Neill played for St. Helens at prop forward in their 2000 Super League Grand Final victory over Wigan Warriors.

=== Widnes ===
In 2001 O'Neill joined the Wakefield Trinity Wildcats but at the end of the 2001 season was signed by Widnes Vikings to boost their forward pack.

O'Neill spent four years at the Vikings, playing in 96 games for the club. In 2003 he played alongside namesake Julian O'Neill, who adopted the nickname Jules to avoid confusion.

=== Return to Auckland ===
In 2006 he returned to Auckland, playing for the Auckland Lions in the Bartercard Cup. He also made the New Zealand Residents side that competed in the 2006 Trans Tasman Quadrangular Series. He scored a try in the Auckland Lions 2007 Bartercard Cup Grand Final win over Harbour League.

In 2009 O'Neill played in the Fox Memorial competition for the Mt Albert Lions and was awarded Man of the match.

== Representative career ==
O'Nell represented NZ playing for the residents team in 1996 and again in 2006 O'Neill also represented the United States national rugby league team.
