= Fred Higgins =

GB & England international rugby league footballer

Personal information
- Born: 16 November 1920 Widnes, Lancashire
- Died: 19 June 1995 (aged 74)

Playing information
- Position: Second-row
Club
Years	Team	Pld	T	G	FG	P
1940–55	Widnes	139	16	13	0	74
1943	→ Wigan (guest)	2	0	0	0	0
	Total	141	16	13	0	74
Representative
Years	Team	Pld	T	G	FG	P
1945–51	Lancashire	6	0	0	0	0
1945–50	England	4	0	0	0	0
1950–51	Great Britain	6	0	0	0	0
- Relatives: Reg Higgins (nephew); Alec Higgins (brother)

Fred Higgins is an English former professional rugby league footballer who played in the 1940s and 1950s. He played at representative level for Great Britain and England, and at club level for Widnes, as a second-row. He also appeared for Wigan as a World War II guest player.

== Playing career ==
=== International honours ===
Fred Higgins won caps for England while at Widnes in 1945 against Wales, in 1949 against France, in 1950 against Wales (2 matches), and won caps for Great Britain while at Widnes in 1950 against Australia (3 matches), and New Zealand (2 matches), and in 1951 against New Zealand.

=== County Cup Final appearances ===
Fred Higgins played right-second-row, in Widnes' 7-3 victory over Wigan in the 1945 Lancashire Cup Final during the 1945–46 season at Wilderspool Stadium, Warrington on Saturday 27 October 1945.

== Honoured at Widnes ==
Fred Higgins is a Widnes Hall Of Fame Inductee.

== Genealogical information ==
Fred Higgins is the younger brother of the rugby league footballers Jack Higgins, and Alec Higgins.
