= Mick Cassidy =

GB, England & Ireland international rugby league footballer

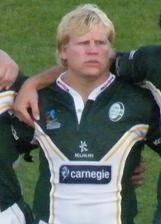

Personal information
- Full name: Michael Darren Cassidy
- Born: 3 July 1973 (age 52) Wigan, Lancashire, England

Playing information
- Height: 6 ft 0 in (1.83 m)
- Weight: 14 st 5 lb (91 kg)
- Position: Prop, Hooker, Second-row
Club
Years	Team	Pld	T	G	FG	P
1990–04	Wigan Warriors	368	52	0	0	208
2005–07	Widnes Vikings	83	6	0	0	24
2008	Barrow Raiders	21	0	0	0	0
	Total	472	58	0	0	232
Representative
Years	Team	Pld	T	G	FG	P
1994–97	Great Britain	4	1	0	0	4
1995–96	England	6	0	0	0	0
1998–08	Ireland	9	1	0	0	4

Michael Darren Cassidy (born 3 July 1973) is the Head of youth development of the Wigan Warriors and a former professional rugby league footballer. Cassidy had a wealth of experience with the dominant Wigan side of the early to mid-1990s. Cassidy is a Great Britain representative. Cassidy's position of choice was in the second-row, but he could also play as a prop or hooker. Cassidy has been labelled a utility player and has played wherever he has been needed.

== Background ==
Cassidy was born in Wigan, Lancashire, England.

== Playing career ==
=== Wigan ===
Cassidy was born in Wigan, Lancashire, and started his career out at his hometown club, Wigan, and progressed through the academy ranks to make his senior début at the age of 18.

Cassidy was a substitute in Wigan's 2–33 defeat by Castleford in the 1993–94 Regal Trophy Final during the 1993–94 season at Elland Road, Leeds on Saturday 22 January 1994, played at second-row in the 40–10 victory over Warrington in the 1994–95 Regal Trophy Final during the 1994–95 season at Alfred McAlpine Stadium, Huddersfield on Saturday 28 January 1995, and played at second-row in the 25–16 victory over St. Helens in the 1995–96 Regal Trophy Final during the 1994–95 season at Alfred McAlpine Stadium, Huddersfield on Saturday 13 January 1996.

After the 1993–94 Rugby Football League season Cassidy travelled with defending champions Wigan to Brisbane, playing from the interchange bench in their 1994 World Club Challenge victory over Australian premiers, Brisbane Broncos.

From the introduction of the Super League in 1996, Cassidy made 62 consecutive league appearances for Wigan until he received a suspension in August 1998. He returned from suspension to play for Wigan as a substitute in their 1998 Super League Grand Final victory over Leeds Rhinos.

Cassidy played for the Wigan Warriors as a second-row in their 2000 Super League Grand Final loss against St. Helens.

Cassidy served a total of 14 years at the Wigan club, enjoying a testimonial in 2000. Cassidy played for the Wigan Warriors as a second-row in their 2001 Super League Grand Final loss to the Bradford Bulls.

Cassidy played for the Wigan Warriors as a second-row in the 2003 Super League Grand Final which was lost to the Bradford Bulls. Cassidy was named in the Wigan team of the decade and was acknowledged as one of the game's best utility players.

=== Widnes ===
Cassidy joined Widnes in 2005, earning the 'Player of the Year' award in his first season at the Halton Stadium. He could not, however save them from relegation from Super League in 2005's Super League X. Cassidy represented the Irish side on numerous occasions over several years. Cassidy finished his playing career with Cumbrian side Barrow Raiders, helping the club win promotion from National League Two in 2008.

=== International career ===
Cassidy was part of the England squad at the 1995 Rugby League World Cup. He was selected to play for England in the 1995 World Cup Final on the reserve bench but Australia won the match and retained the Cup.

In the 1997 post season, Cassidy was selected to play for Great Britain as a second-row in the first game of the Super League Test series against Australia.

Cassidy later switched allegiance through ancestry to play for Ireland. He was ruled out of the 2000 Rugby League World Cup through injury. He was named in the Ireland squad for the 2008 Rugby League World Cup.
