= Steve Hall (rugby league) =

English rugby league footballer

Personal information
- Full name: Stephen Hall
- Born: 10 July 1979 (age 46) St Helens, Merseyside, England

Playing information
- Position: wing
Club
Years	Team	Pld	T	G	FG	P
1999–2001	St Helens	62	21	0	0	84
2002–03	London Broncos	42	12	0	0	48
2004	Widnes Vikings	1	0	0	0	0
	Total	105	33	0	0	132

Steve Hall (born 10 July 1979 in St Helens, Merseyside) is an English former professional rugby league footballer.

Hall's position of choice is on the wing. He played for the London Broncos and St Helens in the Super League and also French club the Saint-Gaudens Bears.

Hall played for St. Helens on the wing in their 2000 Super League Grand Final victory over Wigan Warriors

As of 2012, Hall is a keen cyclist and runs his family-owed second-hand car dealership with his parents and brother in his hometown of St. Helens.
