= Andrew Emelio =

Tonga international rugby league footballer

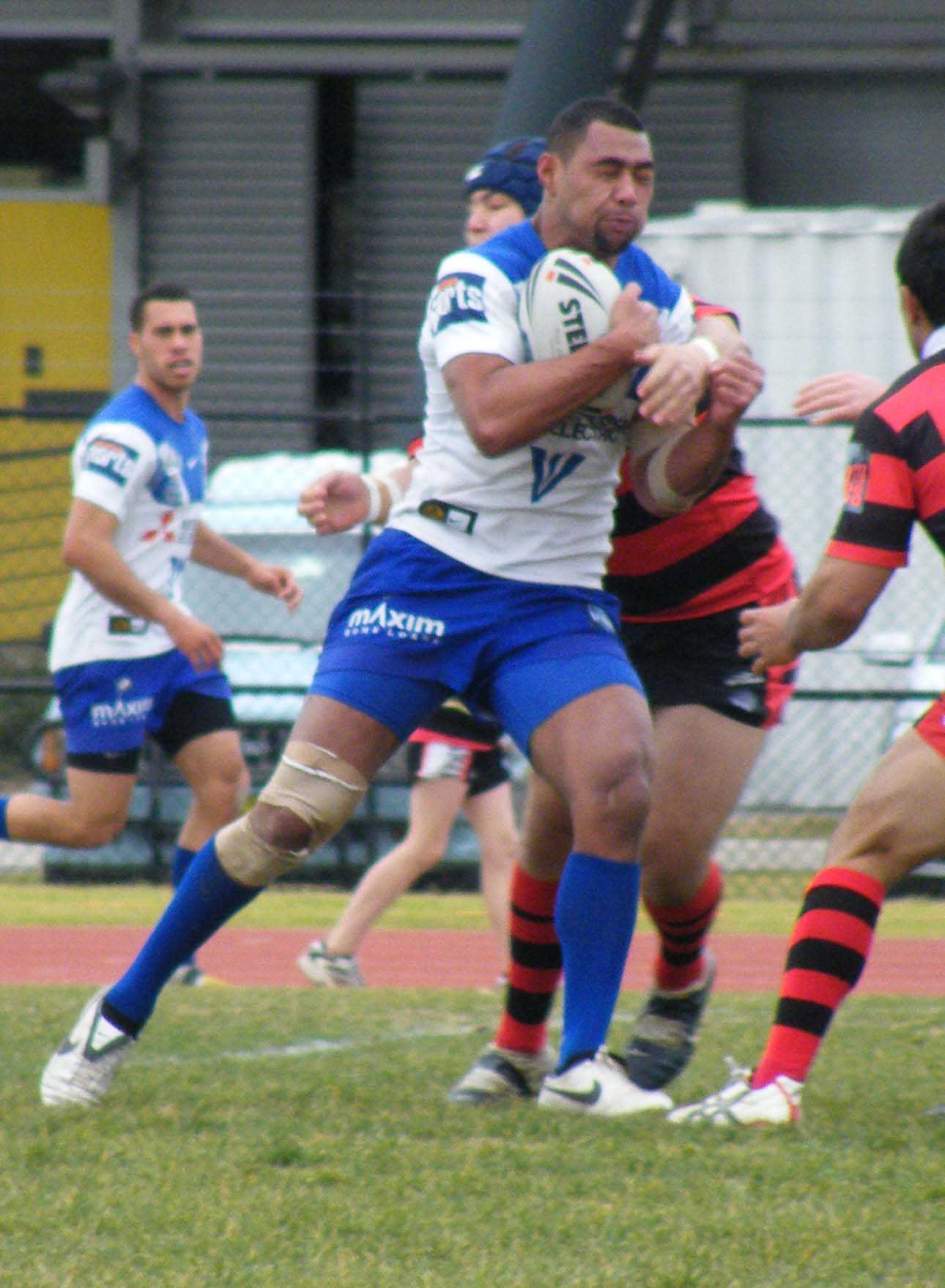

Personal information
- Full name: Andrew Emelio
- Born: 18 October 1981 (age 44) Sydney, New South Wales, Australia
- Height: 186 cm (6 ft 1 in)
- Weight: 100 kg (15 st 10 lb)

Playing information
- Position: Centre, Wing
Club
Years	Team	Pld	T	G	FG	P
2003	Cronulla-Sutherland	7	1	0	0	4
2005	Widnes Vikings	24	8	0	0	32
2006–08	Canterbury Bulldogs	21	9	0	0	36
2009	Penrith Panthers	1	0	0	0	0
	Total	53	18	0	0	72
Representative
Years	Team	Pld	T	G	FG	P
2006–08	Tonga	6	2	0	0	8
- Source: As of 16 January 2019

Andrew 'Drew' Emelio (born 18 October 1981) is a former Tonga international rugby league footballer who played as a centre.

== Background ==
Emelio was born in Sydney, New South Wales, Australia. He is Tongan Australian.

== Playing career ==
Emelio previously played for the Bulldogs Rugby League Football Club and the Cronulla-Sutherland Sharks and the Widnes Vikings in the Super League. He joined the Penrith Panthers in the National Rugby League for 2009 but retired the following year.

== Representative career ==
In October 2008, Emelio was named in the 24-man Tonga squad for the 2008 Rugby League World Cup and he played in one match during the tournament.
