= Keiran Kerr =

Australian rugby league footballer

Personal information
- Born: 8 October 1979 (age 45); Sutherland, New South Wales

Playing information
- Position: Halfback
Club
| Years | Team | Pld | T | G | FG | P |
|---|---|---|---|---|---|---|
| 2001 | St. George Illawarra | 2 | 2 | 0 | 0 | 8 |
| 2004 | West Tigers | 3 | 1 | 0 | 0 | 4 |
| 2005 | Widnes Vikings | 6 | 2 | 0 | 0 | 8 |
| | Total | 11 | 5 | 0 | 0 | 20 |

Keiran Kerr (born 8 October 1979) is a former professional rugby league footballer who played for the St. George Illawarra Dragons, Widnes Vikings and Wests Tigers.
