= Shane Millard =

Australian rugby league footballer and coach

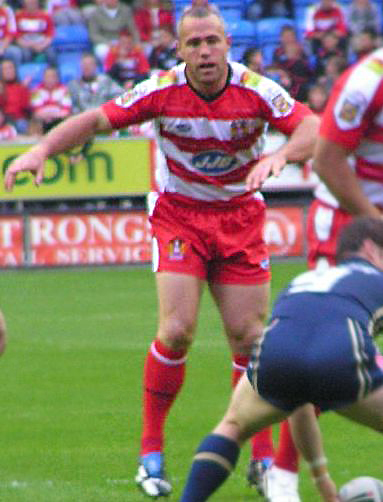
- Millard playing for Wigan in 2007

Personal information
- Born: 30 July 1975 (age 50) Wauchope, New South Wales, Australia

Playing information
- Height: 5 ft 10 in (1.78 m)
- Weight: 14 st 9 lb (93 kg)
- Position: Hooker, Second-row
Club
Years	Team	Pld	T	G	FG	P
1996	Sydney Roosters	4	0	0	0	0
1997	Western Suburbs	20	1	0	0	4
1998	South Sydney	1	0	0	0	0
1998–01	London Broncos	92	12	1	0	50
2002	St. George Illawarra	23	4	0	0	16
2003–05	Widnes Vikings	75	23	0	0	92
2006	Leeds Rhinos	30	4	0	0	16
2007	Wigan Warriors	27	3	0	0	12
	Total	272	47	1	0	190

Coaching information
Representative
Years	Team	Gms	W	D	L	W%
2018	NSW Residents	1	1	0	0	100

Shane Millard (born 30 July 1975) is an Australian former professional rugby league footballer who played as a hooker and second-row forward in the 1990s and 2000s.

During his career he played for the London Broncos, Widnes Vikings, Leeds Rhinos and the Wigan Warriors in Super League as well as gaining recognition in the NRL with the Sydney Roosters, South Sydney Rabbitohs and the St. George Illawarra Dragons.

== Career ==
Millard, who grew up on the Mid North Coast of NSW in Port Macquarie and attended Westport High School, was one of the most experienced players currently playing in the Super League. He has Super League experience with London Broncos, Widnes Vikings, Leeds Rhinos, and has also played for NRL teams, including the St George Illawarra Dragons.

In 2004 Millard completed a match for Widnes with a fragment of tooth embedded in his head after a head clash in the first half with the Castleford Tigers' Dean Ripley.

He played for Widnes Vikings for three years before the club was relegated in 2004 after which he joined Leeds Rhinos to provide back up for Matt Diskin. At the end of 2006 Shane was released from his contract with Leeds and in December 2006 it was announced he had signed a contract with Wigan Warriors on a 2-year deal.

The signing of Millard by Wigan was met with mixed reaction by the Wigan fans, some believed that Millards experience would benefit the Wigan side while other believed that signing a 30-year-old Australian was not benefiting English talent and was not a suitable replacement for Wayne Godwin

Millard has played much of his football as a second row. Though not the tallest or biggest for a second-row he is an agile and committed defender. He also played as a prop for the London Broncos.

After a shoulder problem in the 2007 season Millard decided to retire from rugby league after helping Wigan to the semifinals of the Super League playoffs.

Millard played for the Thirroul Butchers in the 2009 Illawarra rugby league competition. As of 2010 Shane resides in Wollongong, NSW Australia with his wife and three daughters.

== Coaching career ==
In 2018, Millard was announced as the new head coach of the North Sydney Bears. At the end of the 2018 season, Millard was released as North Sydney coach and replaced by former Norths player Jason Taylor.

In 2019, Millard became the head coach of the South Sydney, Canterbury Cup NSW side. On 6 May, Millard was selected as the coach for the Canterbury Cup NSW residents side to play against the Queensland residents representative team.
