= Stephen Nash (rugby league) =

English rugby league footballer

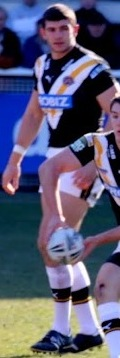

Personal information
- Born: 14 January 1986 (age 40) England

Playing information
- Position: Prop, Second-row
Club
Years	Team	Pld	T	G	FG	P
2005–07	Widnes Vikings	5	0	0	0	0
2007–09	Salford City Reds	20	1	0	0	4
2010–11	Leigh Centurions	28	6	0	0	24
2012–13	Castleford Tigers	7	0	0	0	0
2012(loan)	→ Leigh Centurions	7	0	0	0	0
2013–15	Dewsbury Rams	49	3	0	0	0
2016	Swinton Lions	10	0	0	0	0
	Total	126	10	0	0	28
- Source: As of 28 January 2018

Stephen Nash (born 14 January 1986) is an English rugby league footballer who most recently played for the Swinton Lions in the Kingstone Press Championship. He play as a prop or second-row.

He has previously played for Widnes, Salford, Leigh, Castleford, and the Swinton Lions.
