= Paul Ballard (rugby league) =

English rugby league footballer

Personal information
- Born: 4 September 1984 (age 41)
- Height: 5 ft 11 in (1.80 m)
- Weight: 13 st 4 lb (84 kg)

Playing information
- Position: Wing
Club
Years	Team	Pld	T	G	FG	P
2005	Widnes Vikings	4	2	0	0	8
2006	Leigh Centurions	4	1	0	0	4
2007–09	Crusaders RL	51	40	0	0	160
2009	Whitehaven	9	7	0	0	28
2010	Blackpool Panthers	15	10	0	0	40
2012	Oldham RLFC	5	2	0	0	8
	Total	88	62	0	0	248
- Source: As of 7 July 2021

Paul Ballard (born 4 September 1984) is a rugby league footballer for the Crusaders in the Super League, as a wing.

He has previously played for Leigh Centurions, Oldham RLFC and also Widnes Vikings in the Super League.

He re-signed with the Crusaders for the 2009 season.
