= Paul Crook (rugby league, born 1986) =

English rugby league footballer

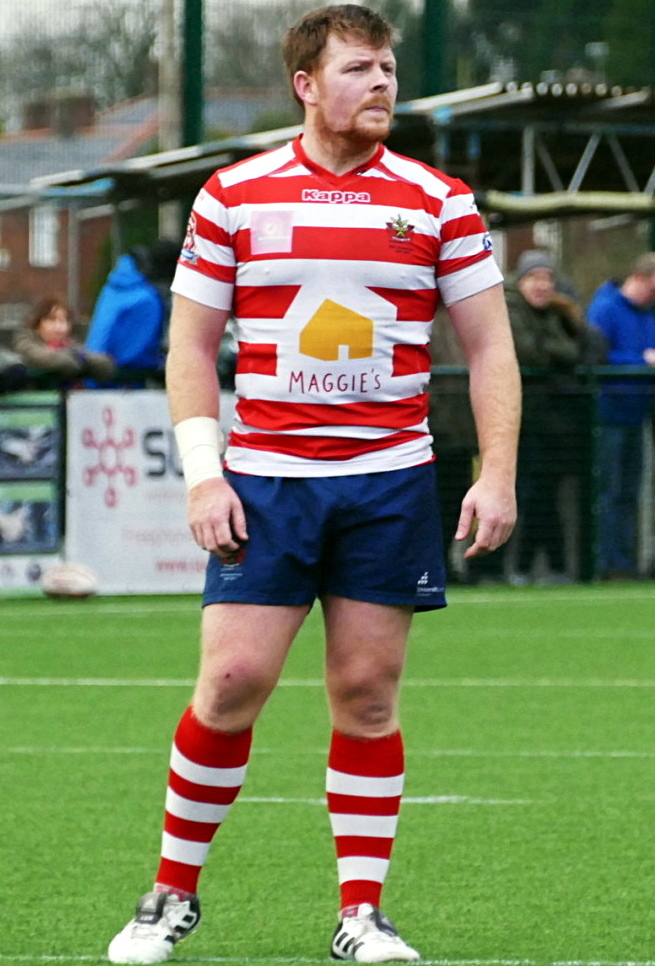

Personal information
- Born: 28 August 1986 (age 40) Whiston Hospital, Knowsley, England
- Height: 5 ft 10 in (178 cm)
- Weight: 14 st 7 lb (92 kg)

Playing information
- Position: Stand-off, Hooker
Club
Years	Team	Pld	T	G	FG	P
2005–07	Widnes Vikings	14
2008	Doncaster	10	2	13	0	34
	Swinton Lions
2010–16	Rochdale Hornets	166	64	616	11	1499
2017	Whitehaven	27	8	105	3	245
2018–19	Oldham	12	1	52	0	108
	Total	229	75	786	14	1886
- Source: As of 30 May 2018

Paul Bryan Crook (born 28 August 1986) is a former English professional rugby league footballer who last played for Oldham in League 1. In Oct 2019 he was appointed to coach the St Helens R.F.C. reserves team.

Crook signed for Whitehaven in October 2016 after captaining Rochdale to winning automatic promotion to the Championship with a 22-24 victory in the Grand Final against Toulouse in September 2016. Crook was also named League Express Player of the Year for Championship 1 in 2016. The Stand-off is a former Widnes Super League player and Great Britain Under-18s captain.

== Background ==
Crook was born in Whiston Hospital, Knowsley, Merseyside, England.

Crook attended Parr Community High School from 1997–2002 and then went on to the Carmel College in St. Helens. He also went on to Edge Hill University, earning a sports and exercise science degree and has since become a qualified teacher of physical education. He now teaches at Hope Academy.

== Career ==
Crook made his Super League début for Widnes in 2005 against London Broncos after progressing through the academy ranks at St. Helens. He went on to make 14 appearances that season under the New Zealand former international coach Frank Endacott. Since leaving Widnes in 2007, Crook has had spells at Doncaster and Swinton Lions before signing for Rochdale Hornets in 2010. Crook became a firm fans favourite over the next 7 seasons earning him the nickname 'The Ginger General' from the Rochdale Hornets supporters. Crook played 166 times for Rochdale Hornets, and after scoring 1499 points became the all-time top points scorer for the club, a record which had stood for 82 years. Crook enjoyed a successful time at Rochdale Hornets earning two league promotions in 2013 and 2016. In October 2016, Crook signed for Whitehaven.

Crook signed for Oldham in October 2017.
