= Joe Lyons (rugby league) =

English rugby league footballer

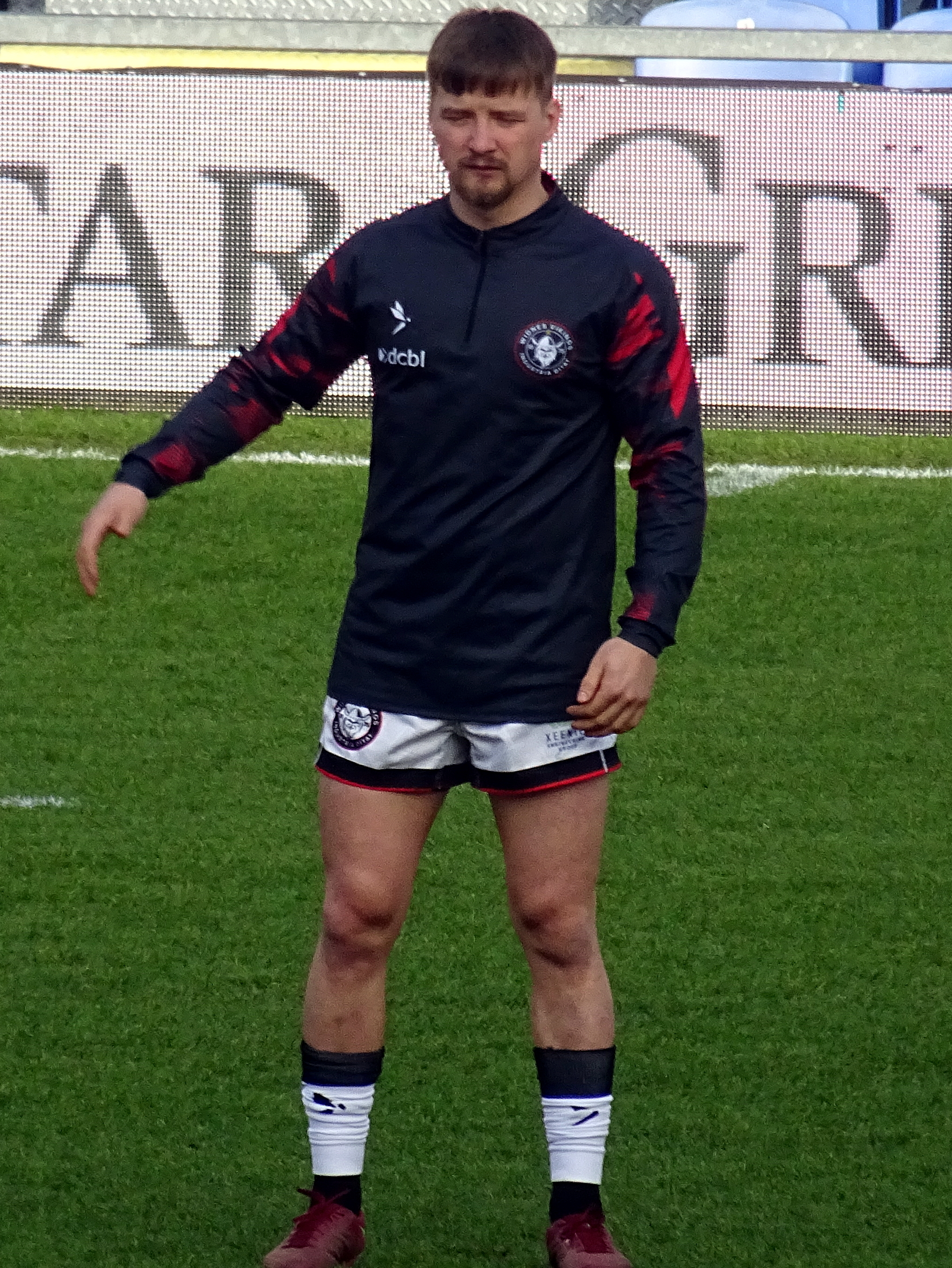

Personal information
- Full name: Joseph Lyons
- Born: 16 October 1997 (age 28) Widnes, Cheshire, England
- Height: 5 ft 10 in (1.79 m)
- Weight: 13 st 5 lb (85 kg)

Playing information
- Position: Scrum-half, Stand-off
Club
Years	Team	Pld	T	G	FG	P
2018–	Widnes Vikings	153	27	0	0	124
2018(loan)	→North Wales Crusaders	16	1	0	0	4
	Total	169	28	0	0	128
- Source: As of 23 January 2026

Joe Lyons (born 16 October 1997) is an English professional rugby league footballer who plays as a scrum-half or stand-off for the Widnes Vikings in the Championship.

== Playing career ==
Widnes-born Joe began playing rugby with the local Moorfield club before eventually joining the Widnes Scholarship Programme at the age of 14, and progressing through the club's Academy structure to captain the Under 19's in 2017, while also taking the BTEC National Diploma in Sport course. ‘Joey’ paid tribute to the support of his family and the input of all the coaches he has worked with as he named his senior debut against Leeds Rhinos in the 2018 Qualifiers as his career highlight to date.

=== Widnes Vikings ===
With the further experience of 16 appearances for North Wales Crusaders, including his first senior try, in 2018 he now looks forward to claiming a regular starting place in the Vikings’ first team as they seek an immediate return to Super League. Away from rugby Joe is a keen supporter of Manchester United.

He made his début for Widnes against the Leeds Rhinos in 2018.
