= Adam Hughes (rugby, born 1977) =

English rugby league and union footballer

Personal information
- Full name: Adam Hughes
- Born: 1 October 1977 (age 48) Leeds, England

Playing information

Rugby league
- Position: Centre, Wing
Club
Years	Team	Pld	T	G	FG	P
1996–97	Leeds Rhinos	12	7	0	0	28
1999–00	Wakefield Trinity (Wildcats)	47	21	34	0	152
2001	Halifax	16	8	0	0	32
2002–05	Widnes Vikings	99	53	63	0	338
2006	Leigh Centurions	23	12	0	0	48
2007	Oldham	16	22	12	0	112
2008	Barrow Raiders	18	9	0	0	36
	Total	231	132	109	0	746
Representative
Years	Team	Pld	T	G	FG	P
2002–07	Wales	13	9	3	0	42

Rugby union
Club
Years	Team	Pld	T	G	FG	P
1997–99	Leeds Tykes
- Relatives: Ian Hughes (brother)

Adam Hughes (born 1 October 1977) is an English former professional rugby league and rugby union footballer who played in the 1990s and 2000s. He played representative rugby league (RL) for Wales, and at club level for Milford ARLFC, in Leeds, the Leeds Rhinos, the Wakefield Trinity (Wildcats), Halifax, the Widnes Vikings, the Leigh Centurions, Oldham, and the Barrow Raiders, as a centre or wing, and club level rugby union (RU) for Leeds Tykes.

== Background ==
Hughes was born in Leeds, West Yorkshire, England.

== Playing career ==
=== International honours ===
Hughes won caps for Wales (RL) in 2002 against New Zealand, in 2003 against Russia, and Australia, in 2004 against Ireland. and Scotland, in 2005 against Scotland, and France, in 2006 against Scotland, and in 2007 against Papua New Guinea, Scotland, and Lebanon. Hughes won his caps for Wales while at Widnes, Leigh, and Oldham 2002–2007 13(11?)-caps.

=== First Division Grand Final appearances ===
Hughes played at centre in Wakefield Trinity's 24–22 victory over Featherstone Rovers in the 1998 First Division Grand Final at McAlpine Stadium, Huddersfield on Saturday 26 September 1998.

=== Championship Cup Final appearances ===
Hughes played at centre in Leigh Centurions' 22–18 victory over Hull Kingston Rovers in the 2006 Northern Rail Cup Final at Bloomfield Road, Blackpool on Sunday 16 July 2006.

== Genealogical information ==
Adam Hughes is the younger brother of the rugby league footballer; Ian Hughes.
