= David Mills (rugby league) =

Wales international rugby league footballer

David "The Beast" Mills
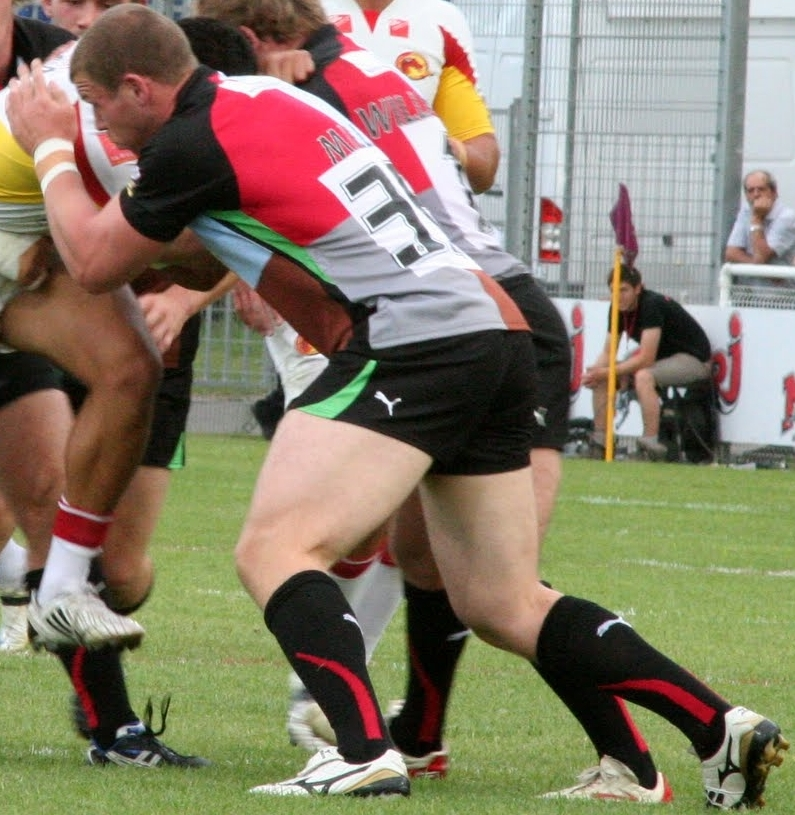

Personal information
- Full name: David Mills
- Born: 1 June 1981 (age 45) Widnes, Cheshire, England
- Height: 6 ft 5 in (1.96 m)
- Weight: 18 st 9 lb (118 kg)

Playing information
- Position: Prop
Club
| Years | Team | Pld | T | G | FG | P |
|---|---|---|---|---|---|---|
| 2002–05 | Widnes Vikings | 93 | 8 | 0 | 0 | 32 |
| 2006–07 | Harlequins RL | 44 | 2 | 0 | 0 | 8 |
| 2008–09 | Hull Kingston Rovers | 36 | 2 | 0 | 0 | 8 |
| 2010 | Harlequins RL | 14 | 0 | 0 | 0 | 0 |
| 2011 | Leigh Centurions | 27 | 4 | 0 | 0 | 16 |
| 2012–13 | Swinton Lions | 46 | 5 | 0 | 0 | 20 |
| 2014 | North Wales Crusaders | 8 | 0 | 0 | 0 | 0 |
| | Total | 268 | 21 | 0 | 0 | 84 |
Representative
| Years | Team | Pld | T | G | FG | P |
| 2002–08 | Wales | 8 | 0 | 0 | 0 | 0 |
| | Lancashire |
- Father: Jim Mills

David Mills (born 1 June 1981) is a former Wales international rugby league footballer who played as a prop in the 2000s and 2010s.

He played for the Widnes Vikings, Harlequins RL in two separate spells, Hull Kingston Rovers, Leigh Centurions, Swinton Lions and the North Wales Crusaders. He also played for Lancashire in the War of the Roses.

== Background ==
Mills was born in Widnes, Cheshire, England, he has Welsh ancestors, and eligible to play for Wales due to the grandparent rule, as he is the son of the Welsh rugby league footballer; 'Big Jim' Mills.

== Playing career ==
He has previously played for his hometown club Widnes Vikings.

He joined Hull Kingston Rovers for the 2008 season after they avoided relegation in 2007's Super League XII.

He was named as captain of the Wales squad to face England at the Keepmoat Stadium prior to England's departure for the 2008 Rugby League World Cup.

Crusaders and Castleford were interested in signing Mills due to Hull Kingston Rovers looking to release him to make way for Joel Clinton, however he joined (though never played for) newly formed Welsh club South Wales Scorpions.

On 14 May 2010, he returned to Harlequins in a one-month loan agreement.

Mills spent the 2011 season with Leigh Centurions, winning the 2011 Northern Rail Cup in the process before signing for Swinton Lions ahead of the 2012 season.
