= Gray Viane =

Samoa international rugby league footballer

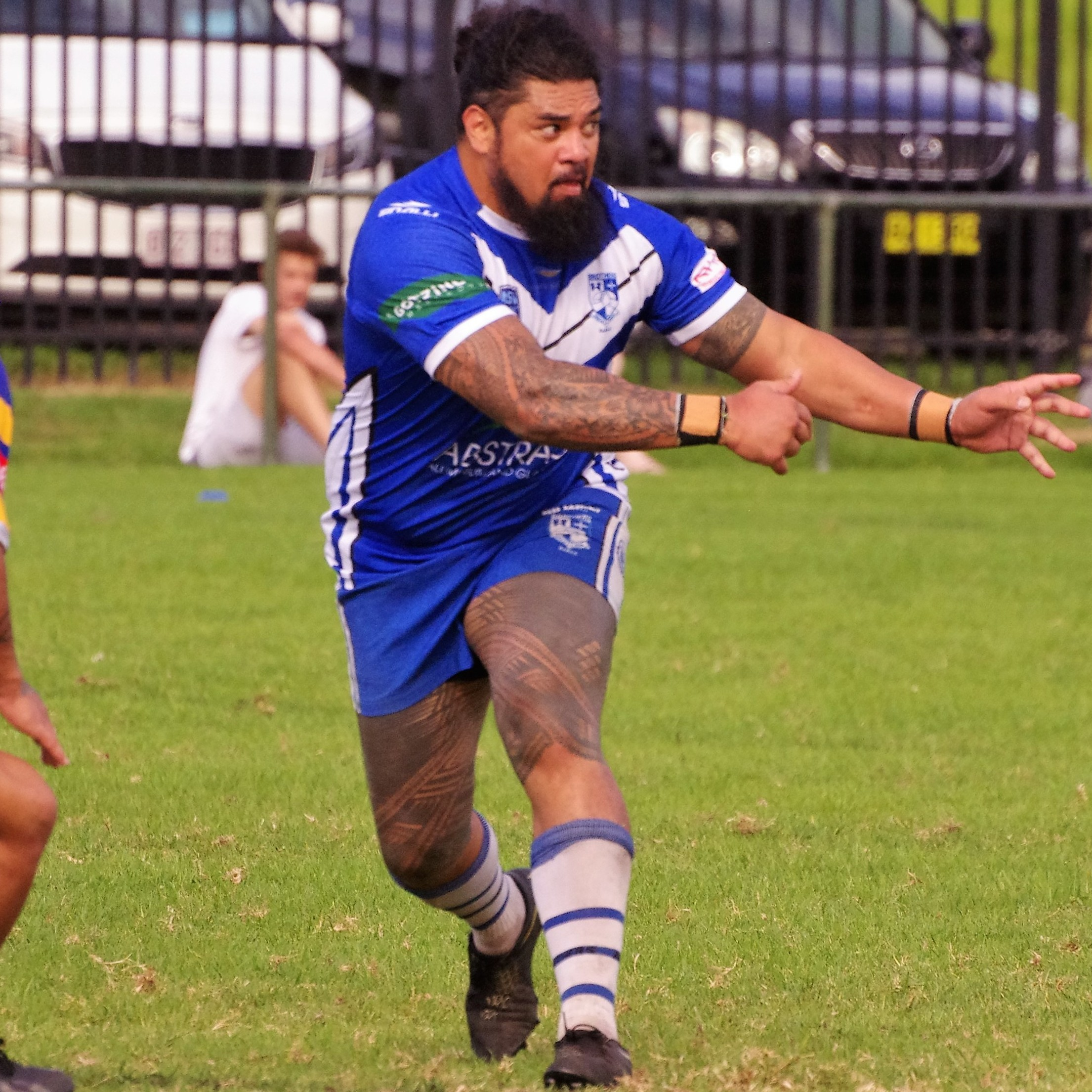

Personal information
- Full name: Gray Viane
- Born: 19 May 1982 (age 44) Ōtāhuhu, New Zealand

Playing information
- Height: 175 cm (5 ft 9 in)
- Weight: 95 kg (14 st 13 lb)
- Position: Second-row, Centre, Wing
Club
Years	Team	Pld	T	G	FG	P
2003	Wests Tigers	9	0	0	0	0
2004	St Helens	4	1	0	0	4
2005	Widnes Vikings	20	13	0	0	52
2006	Castleford Tigers	27	14	0	0	56
2007	Salford City Reds	11	2	0	0	8
	Total	71	30	0	0	120
Representative
Years	Team	Pld	T	G	FG	P
2005–06	Samoa	5	0	0	0	0

Gray Viane (born 19 May 1982) is a former professional rugby league footballer who played in the 2000s.

== Early life ==
Viane was born in Ōtāhuhu, New Zealand.

Viane played junior rugby league for the Leumeah Wolves and Liverpool Catholic Club Raiders, and attended Sarah Redfern High (a renowned rugby league school in Minto, New South Wales). He was selected to represent the Australian schoolboys rugby union team.

== Playing career ==
Viane began his career in Australia with Wests Tigers, playing 9 NRL first grade games in 2003, before moving to England and signing in 2004 with St. Helens. Viane managed 4 games in total at St. Helens, scoring one try. The Samoan moved onto Widnes Vikings a season later and featured more prominently in the club's bid for Super League survival. He led the scoring sheet with thirteen tries in his stint in Widnes.

Widnes were relegated at the end of the season. He then moved onto the newly promoted Castleford Tigers in 2006 and had a good spell at the club playing 27 games and once again being the leading try scorer with 14 tries. He moved to Salford to replace the retired Junior Langi, and was given the number 15 shirt, playing 9 games with 2 tries.

Viane was known for his tough defence and prolific try scoring. He was a Samoa international.
