= Sala Fa'alogo =

New Zealand rugby league footballer

Personal information
- Born: 20 September 1977 (age 47); Auckland, New Zealand

Playing information
- Position: Centre, Second-row
Club
Years	Team	Pld	T	G	FG	P
2004–05	Widnes Vikings	23	2	0	0	8
- Relatives: David Fa'alogo (brother)

Sala Fa'alogo is a New Zealand former professional rugby league footballer who played in the 2000s and 2010s. He played at club level in the Bartercard Cup and Auckland Rugby League's Fox Memorial competition for the Mount Albert Lions (two spells), in the Bartercard Cup for the Counties Manukau Jetz and in the Super League for the Widnes Vikings.

== Background ==
Sala Fa'alogo was born in Auckland, New Zealand, is of Samoan descent, and he is the older brother of the rugby league footballer; David Fa'alogo.

== Playing career ==
In 2001 and 2002 Fa'alogo played for Mount Albert in the Bartercard Cup. He was the player of the match in the Grand Final, helping the Lions to a 24–20 win over the Hibiscus Coast Raiders. He played for the Counties Manukau Jetz in 2004.

Fa'alogo joined the Widnes Vikings in the Super League in 2004 on a two-year deal. He played in 23 Super League matches as well as Challenge Cup games.

In 2009 he was named in the Fox Memorial Team of the Year at second row. Fa'alogo represented Auckland in the 2009 Bartercard Premiership and the 2010 National Zonal Competition. He currently plays for the Mount Albert Lions in the 2011 Fox Memorial competition.
