= Simon Finnigan =

Professional rugby league coach & former Ireland international rugby league footballer

Simon "Finny" Finnigan
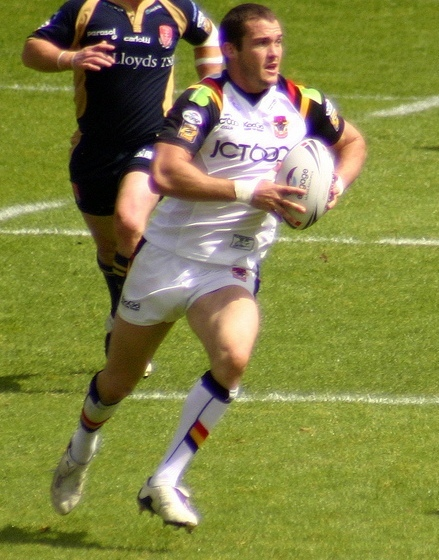

Personal information
- Full name: Simon Finnigan
- Born: 8 December 1981 (age 44) Warrington, Cheshire, England
- Height: 6 ft 2 in (1.88 m)
- Weight: 14 st 13 lb (95 kg)

Playing information
- Position: Loose forward, Second-row
Club
Years	Team	Pld	T	G	FG	P
2003–05	Widnes Vikings	70	21	0	0	84
2005–07	Salford City Reds	49	17	0	0	68
2008	Bradford Bulls	30	10	0	0	40
2009–10	Huddersfield Giants	29	6	0	0	24
2011–12	Widnes Vikings	32	9	0	0	36
2013	Leigh Centurions	27	12	0	0	48
	Total	237	75	0	0	300
Representative
Years	Team	Pld	T	G	FG	P
2005–13	Ireland	9	1	0	0	4

Coaching information
Club
Years	Team	Gms	W	D	L	W%
2019–20	Newcastle Thunder	33	23	1	9	70
2021–22	Widnes Vikings	34	15	1	18	44
	Total	67	38	2	27	57
- Source: As of 24 September 2026

Simon Finnigan (born 8 December 1981) is a professional rugby league coach who is the assistant head coach at Oldham in the Betfred Championship and a former professional rugby league footballer.

He was previously the head coach of the Widnes Vikings in the Championship and was previously head coach at Newcastle Thunder and an assistant coach at the Toronto Wolfpack. An Ireland international second-row, he played in the Super League for the Widnes Vikings, Salford City Reds, Bradford Bulls and the Huddersfield Giants, and in the Championship for the Leigh Centurions.

== Background ==
Simon Finnigan was born in Warrington, Cheshire, England, he grew up in Australia, playing for the Penrith Panthers junior teams before joining Widnes Vikings in 2003.

== Club career ==
Finnigan played three seasons in Super League for Widnes Vikings, before leaving following the club's relegation at the end of the 2005 Super League season. He subsequently joined Salford City Reds, where he played for two seasons before again leaving when the club was relegated at the end of the 2007 Super League season. He signed for Bradford Bulls in September 2007 and stayed for one year before joining Huddersfield Giants in 2009. He rejoined Widnes Vikings in 2011, before finishing his career with Leigh Centurions in 2013. He announced his retirement from the sport in January 2014.

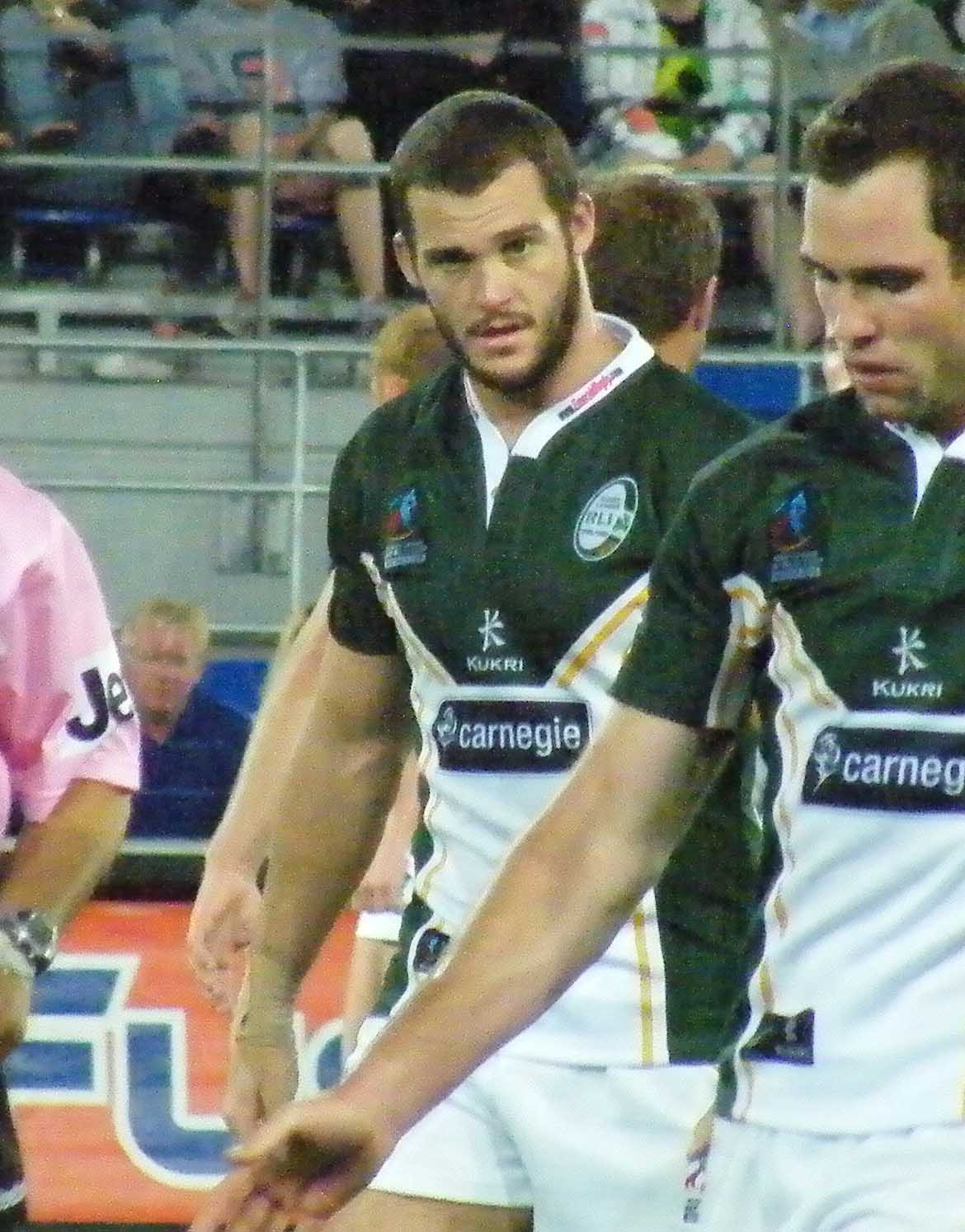
Finnigan playing at the 2008 Rugby League World Cup

== Representative ==
He was named in the Ireland training squad for the 2008 Rugby League World Cup, and the Ireland squad for the 2008 Rugby League World Cup.

He was again named in the Ireland squad for the 2013 Rugby League World Cup, and made two appearances in the tournament, his final rugby league match being Ireland's defeat against Australia.

== Statistics ==
=== Club career (Super League) ===
Year	Club	Apps	Pts	T	G	FG
2003	Widnes Vikings	19	4	1	-	-
2004	Widnes Vikings	25	32	8	–	-
2005	Widnes Vikings	26	48	12	–	-
2006	Salford City Reds	25	48	12	-	-
2007	Salford City Reds	25	20	5	-	-
2008	Bradford Bulls	26	28	7	-	-
2009	Huddersfield Giants	20	20	5	-	-
2010	Huddersfield Giants	7	4	1	-	-
2012	Widnes Vikings	10	0	0	-	-

=== Representative career ===
Year	Team	Matches	Tries	Goals	Field Goals	Points
2008–13	Ireland	9	1	0	0	4

== Coaching career ==
After retiring as a player, Finnigan moved into coaching become assistant coach at the Toronto Wolfpack. In 2019 he became head coach of Newcastle Thunder then in League 1, the third tier of rugby league in the United Kingdom.

Finnigan was appointed the head coach of the Widnes Vikings in the Championship (the second tier) in November 2020 but left the club in April 2022 by "mutual consent".
