= Jon Whittle =

English rugby league footballer

Personal information
- Full name: Jon Whittle
- Born: 9 September 1982 (age 42)

Playing information

Rugby union
Club
| Years | Team | Pld | T | G | FG | P |
|---|---|---|---|---|---|---|
| 2000±–03± | Orrell R.U.F.C. |

Rugby league
- Position: Wing, Centre
Club
| Years | Team | Pld | T | G | FG | P |
|---|---|---|---|---|---|---|
| 2003 | Wigan Warriors | 1 | 0 | 0 | 0 | 0 |
| 2005 | Widnes Vikings | 13 | 2 | 0 | 0 | 8 |
| 2006 | Wakefield Trinity Wildcats | 10 | 3 | 0 | 0 | 12 |
| 2006(loan) | →Hull Kingston Rovers | 5 | 1 | 0 | 0 | 4 |
| 2007 | Featherstone Rovers | 28 | 13 | 0 | 0 | 52 |
| | Total | 57 | 19 | 0 | 0 | 76 |

Jon Whittle (born 9 September 1982) is a former professional rugby union and rugby league footballer who played in the 2000s. He played club level rugby union (RU), for Orrell R.U.F.C., and club level rugby league (RL), for Wigan Warriors, Widnes Vikings, Wakefield Trinity Wildcats, and Featherstone Rovers, as a wing, or centre.

== Playing career ==
=== Club career ===
Jon Whittle made his début for Featherstone Rovers on Sunday 11 February 2007.
