= Daniel Frame =

Australian rugby league footballer

Personal information
- Full name: Daniel Frame
- Born: 7 June 1975 (age 51) Bathurst, New South Wales, Australia

Playing information
- Height: 6 ft 0 in (183 cm)
- Weight: 14 st 7 lb (92 kg)
- Position: Lock, Second-row
Club
Years	Team	Pld	T	G	FG	P
1998	Melbourne Storm	7	0	0	0	0
2000	Dewsbury Rams	15	7	0	0	28
2002–05	Widnes Vikings	114	26	0	0	104
	Total	136	33	0	0	132

Daniel Frame (born 7 June 1975) is an Australian former professional rugby league footballer who played in the 1990s and 2000s. He played for the Melbourne Storm in 1998, then went over to England to play with the Widnes Vikings from 2002 to 2005.

== Playing career ==
Originally from the Central Coast, Frame played his junior football with Wyong Roos.

A loose forward, Frame made his first grade debut for Melbourne Storm in round 15 of the 1998 NRL season against North Queensland Cowboys. He would play seven matches for the club in 1998, and was part of a minor controversy when caught on the sidelines during a match wearing a paper mask of then suspended teammate Rodney Howe. Playing for Melbourne's feeder club Norths Devils, Frame was a member of the Devils 1998 Queensland Cup winning team.

Frame remained with Melbourne during the 1999 season, but only featured in matches for Norths Devils. Frame would play a representative game for the Queensland Residents rugby league team against NSW in 1999. He was released at the end of the 1999 season.

Moving to England, Frame played for Dewsbury Rams during the Rams 2000 Northern Ford Premiership campaign, playing in the club's 13–12 win in the premiership final against Leigh. After a season back in Australia with Wynnum-Manly Seagulls, in late 2001 he joined Widnes Vikings, after the Vikings were promoted to Super League.

Frame would go on to play four seasons with Widnes, scoring the club's first try in the 2002 Super League season. He would qualify as a non-import player in 2003 after it was found that his mother was from Hull and Frame gained British citizenship.

After Widnes were relegated from Super League in 2005, Frame returned to Australia, later playing in the Newcastle Rugby League competition with Lakes United.
