= Mark Smith (rugby league) =

English rugby league footballer

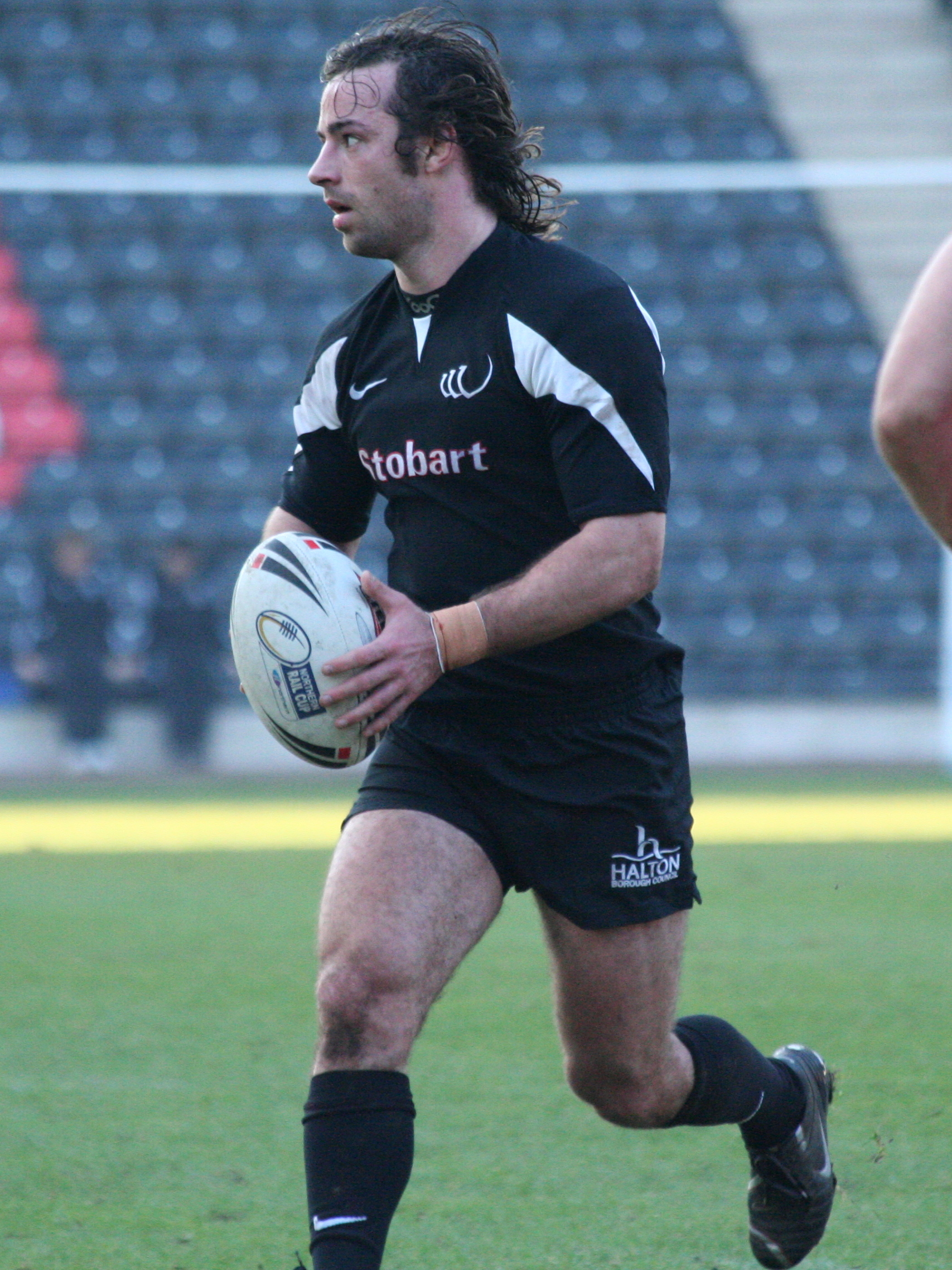

Personal information
- Born: 18 August 1981 (age 45) England

Playing information
- Height: 5 ft 10 in (1.78 m)
- Weight: 13 st 8 lb (86 kg)
- Position: Hooker
Club
Years	Team	Pld	T	G	FG	P
1999–04	Wigan Warriors	123	12	0	0	48
2005–10	Widnes Vikings	167	59	0	2	238
2011–13	Swinton Lions	77	4	0	0	16
	Total	367	75	0	2	302

Mark Smith (born 18 August 1981) is an English former professional rugby league footballer. He was signed by Swinton after captaining Widnes in National League One. Primarily a hooker, he previously played in the Super League for the Wigan, with whom he won the 2002 Challenge Cup.

== Career ==
Smith played for the Wigan Warriors from the interchange bench in the 2003 Super League Grand Final which was lost to the Bradford Bulls.

Smith was captain of the Widnes Vikings side since the retirement of Terry O'Connor in 2006. He has on very rare occasion spent time as a loose forward.

== Career statistics ==
Season	Club					
Season	Club	Apps	Tries	Goals	Field goals	Points
1999	Wigan Warriors	17	1	0	0	4
2000	Wigan Warriors	9	3	0	0	12
2001	Wigan Warriors	14	0	0	0	0
2002	Wigan Warriors	28	2	0	0	8
2003	Wigan Warriors	25	1	0	0	4
2004	Wigan Warriors	30	5	0	0	20
Totals:		123	12	0	0	48
2005	Widnes Vikings	30	5	0	0	20
2006	Widnes Vikings	32	26	0	1	105
2007	Widnes Vikings	31	14	0	0	56
2008	Widnes Vikings	22	3	0	0	12
2009	Widnes Vikings	30	7	0	1	29
2010	Widnes Vikings	22	4	0	0	16
Totals:		167	59	0	2	238
2011	Swinton Lions	25	3	0	0	12
2012	Swinton Lions	24	0	0	0	0
2013	Swinton Lions	28	1	0	0	4
Totals:		77	4	0	0	16
Totals:		367	75	0	2	302
