= Owen Craigie =

Australian rugby league footballer

Personal information
- Born: 19 April 1978 (age 48) Inverell, New South Wales, Australia

Playing information
- Height: 176 cm (5 ft 9 in)
- Weight: 98 kg (15 st 6 lb)
- Position: Five-eighth, Centre, Fullback
Club
| Years | Team | Pld | T | G | FG | P |
|---|---|---|---|---|---|---|
| 1995–99 | Newcastle Knights | 76 | 32 | 7 | 0 | 142 |
| 2000–01 | Wests Tigers | 23 | 7 | 0 | 0 | 28 |
| 2002–04 | South Sydney | 54 | 11 | 31 | 2 | 108 |
| 2005 | Widnes Vikings | 15 | 7 | 0 | 2 | 20 |
| | Total | 168 | 57 | 38 | 4 | 298 |

Owen Craigie (born 19 April 1978) is an Australian former professional rugby league footballer who played in the 1990s and 2000s. He previously played for the Newcastle Knights, the Wests Tigers and the South Sydney Rabbitohs in the National Rugby League, and the Widnes Vikings in the Super League. Craigie primarily played as a five-eighth, as well as a centre and fullback. Craigie's career was cut short due to ongoing injuries.

== Playing career ==
While attending Hamilton St. Francis Xavier, Craigie played for the Australian Schoolboys team in 1994, 1995 and 1996. He is the only player to make the team three years running. Danny Buderus described him as, "the most freakish talent I came across in my junior days."

=== Newcastle Knights ===
Craigie made his first grade début in 1995 against the Brisbane Broncos as a 16 year old while he was still attending school, and in his four years at the Knights he often displayed his brilliant natural ability and skill. He scored 32 tries for the Knights, and was a member of the 1997 premiership winning team. Andrew Johns said he was the "best naturally talented player I played with."

During the 1997 season, Craigie complained that he had been racially vilified during a match against North Sydney Bears. Offending player, Chris Caruana was dropped from the Norths team and was fined.

At the end of the 1999 season, Craigie's contract had ended and he was quickly signed by the Wests Tigers.

=== Wests Tigers ===
Craigie played for two seasons at the Tigers, but his problems only grew as he spent a large time on the sidelines. His two seasons were cut short by on several occasions by many niggling injuries, as well as his previous problems of form and fitness he had battled at the Knights, and as a result his contract was not renewed.

=== South Sydney Rabbitohs ===
In 2002, the South Sydney Rabbitohs signed Craigie on a two-year deal in the hope that his fitness problems could be overcome and he could further display his ability he had shown in glimpses at his two previous clubs. In his first season at South Sydney, he started twenty one of the twenty four games the Rabbitohs played in their season, and things finally looked to be on the up for Craigie. However, with new coach Paul Langmack taking over at the Rabbitohs in 2004, Craigie only began two of the first twelve games of the season. Craigie publicly accused Langmack of being racist, which was denied by Langmack. Not long after Langmack was released from the club, with Arthur Kitinas being appointed as head coach. With a new coach at the helm Craigie began to prosper again, and the Rabbitohs won the next three of their four matches, including a win over 2003 premiers the Penrith Panthers in which Craigie was awarded man of the match.

=== Widnes Vikings ===
For the 2005 season, Craigie signed for English Super League club Widnes Vikings. However, injuries, family troubles and fitness problems meant that his new beginning never really lifted to the heights that the English club had hoped and wished for. Midway through the Super League season Craigie and the club came to a mutual agreement to terminate his contract after he suffered a serious knee injury. Craigie quickly moved back to Australia.

== Sources ==
- Alan Whiticker & Glen Hudson (2007). The Encyclopedia of Rugby League Players. Wetherill Park, New South Wales: Gary Allen Pty Ltd. ISBN 978-1-877082-93-1.
