= Brad Watts =

Australian rugby league footballer

Personal information
- Born: 13 March 1980 (age 46) Brisbane, Queensland, Australia

Playing information
- Height: 181 cm (5 ft 11 in)
- Position: Wing, Fullback, Halfback
Club
Years	Team	Pld	T	G	FG	P
1999–01	Melbourne Storm	36	12	11	0	70
2002–05	South Sydney	63	15	19	0	98
2005	Widnes Vikings	6	3	0	0	12
	Total	105	30	30	0	180

Brad Watts (born 13 March 1980) is an Australian former professional rugby league footballer who competed in the National Rugby League. He played for the Melbourne Storm from 1999 to 2001, then for the South Sydney Rabbitohs from 2002 to 2005. Watts also played with the Widnes Vikings club in the then Super League in 2005. He usually played fullback, but later moved to halfback.

== Playing career ==
Having won the 1999 Premiership, Melbourne Storm contested in the 2000 World Club Challenge against Super League Champions St. Helens, with Watts playing on the wing and kicking six-goals in the victory.
