= Gary Hulse =

Wales international rugby league footballer

Personal information
- Full name: Gary Hulse
- Born: 20 January 1981 (age 45)

Playing information
- Height: 5 ft 5 in (1.65 m)
- Weight: 11 st 9 lb (74 kg)
- Position: Fullback, Stand-off, Scrum-half
Club
Years	Team	Pld	T	G	FG	P
2001–04	Warrington Wolves	22+28	11	0	1	45
2005–06	Widnes	28	3	0	0	12
2005(Loan)	Doncaster	4	2	0	0	8
2007	Rochdale Hornets	18+7	7	0	0	28
2008–10	Swinton	49+19	13	0	0	52
	Total	175	36	0	1	145
Representative
Years	Team	Pld	T	G	FG	P
2006	Wales	+1

Gary Hulse (born 20 January 1981) is a former professional rugby league footballer who played in the 2000s and 2010s. He played at representative level for Great Britain (Under-21s (Academy)), and Wales, and at club level for Warrington Wolves, Widnes Vikings, Rochdale Hornets and Swinton Lions, as a fullback, stand-off, or scrum-half.

== International honours ==
Gary Hulse won a cap for Wales while at Widnes in 2006 (interchange/substitute), but was unable to obtain further caps due to injury. Hulse also played, and was captain and goal kicker for Great Britain Under-21s/Academy.
