= John Stankevitch =

Rugby league professional coach and former player

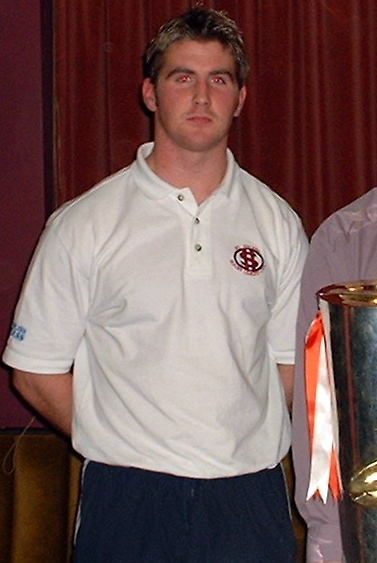

Personal information
- Born: 6 November 1979 (age 46) Whiston, Merseyside, England
- Height: 6 ft 1 in (1.85 m)

Playing information
- Position: Second-row, Prop
Club
Years	Team	Pld	T	G	FG	P
2000–04	St. Helens	131	26	0	0	104
2005	Widnes Vikings	22				0
	Total	153	26	0	0	104
Representative
Years	Team	Pld	T	G	FG	P
	Lancashire

Coaching information
Club
Years	Team	Gms	W	D	L	W%
2007	Doncaster RLFC	0	0	0	0
2009	Widnes Vikings	5	4	0	1	80
2009–12	Rochdale Hornets
	Total	5	4	0	1	80
Representative
Years	Team	Gms	W	D	L	W%
2011	Russia	3	1	0	2	33
- Source: As of 8 February 2021

John Stankevitch (born 6 November 1979 in Whiston, Merseyside, England) is an English former professional rugby league footballer who played in the 2000s, and coached in the 2000s and 2010s. Stankevitch played for St. Helens and the Widnes in the Super League as a second-row and as a prop.

== Playing career ==
Having won the 1999 Championship, St. Helens contested the 2000 World Club Challenge against National Rugby League Premiers the Melbourne Storm, with Stankevitch playing from the interchange bench in the loss. This was Stankevitch's First Team début.

As Super League V champions, St. Helens played against 2000 NRL Premiers, the Brisbane Broncos in the 2001 World Club Challenge. Stankevitch played from the interchange bench in Saints' victory. Stankevitch played for St. Helens from the interchange bench in their 2002 Super League Grand Final victory against the Bradford Bulls. Having won Super League VI, St Helens contested the 2003 World Club Challenge against 2002 NRL Premiers, the Sydney Roosters. Stankevitch played at prop in Saints' 38-0 loss.

== Coaching career ==
Since retiring from playing, through a serious shoulder and neck injury in 2005, Stankevitch has coached at numerous Rugby League and Rugby Union clubs including stints at Widnes and Doncaster.

=== Widnes Vikings ===
Beginning his coaching career at his home town club Widnes Vikings, as Senior Academy Head Coach in 2006, Stankevitch led the side to 2 Grand Finals in two seasons, and assisted in the development of players such as Catalans Dragons' Richie Myler, Bradford Bulls star Adam Sidlow, Leeds Rhinos prop Anthony Mullally and current Man Of Steel, Castleford Tigers star man Luke Gale.

=== Doncaster RLFC ===
In 2007 Stankevitch was approached by Championship side Doncaster RL and asked to take over as head coach, midway through the season. It was a tough ask, as Doncaster sat bottom of the table, 13 points adrift of safety with only 7 league games remaining. Despite taking over and building a team from scratch inside a week (players had been released due to club administration), the team were relegated at the end of the 2007 season, despite winning 4 of their last 7 games.

=== Widnes Vikings (return) ===
At the end of the 2007 season Stankevitch tendered his resignation in order to return to the Widnes Vikings as assistant coach, working with the First Team squad on a full-time basis and he held that role until January 2009 when he was appointed caretaker head coach, after the dismissal of Steve McCormack.

Stankevitch, in the games that followed, led the Vikings to a record Challenge Cup victory against Saddleworth Rangers. He also led the first team to a televised victory against Toulouse Olympique in which the team won by 72-0, in Round 1 of the League season. Stankevitch also led the team through the group stages of the Northern Rail Cup, and the club went on to win the Cup later in that year.

Stankevitch left the club in June 2009, after the appointment of Paul Cullen as head coach and the club reverting to part-time.

=== Rotherham Titans RU ===
Stankevitch was recruited as backs coach and coaching advisor at Rugby Union Championship side Rotherham Titans, where he spent 6 months.

=== Rochdale Hornets ===
Stankevitch joined Rochdale Hornets in Championship 1 ahead of the 2010 season, in the position of head coach. He led the Rochdale Hornets club to Play Off finishing positions in 2010, 2011 and 2012. In November 2012, Stankevitch left his role as head coach at Rochdale Hornets and he is yet to return to Professional coaching as of 2022.

=== Russia ===
In October 2011, Stankevitch was appointed as Performance Coaching Consultant with Russia for their World Cup Qualifying fixtures and acted as head coach for the games against Italy, Lebanon and Serbia.
