= 2006 Widnes Vikings season =

- National League One Rank: 2nd
- Play-off result: Runners Up
- Challenge Cup: Round Five
- National League Cup: Quarter Finalists
- 2006 record: Wins: 14; draws: 0; losses: 4
- Points scored: For: 729; against: 449

Team information
- Coach: Steve McCormack
- Stadium: Stobart Stadium Halton
- Avg. attendance: 3,645
- High attendance: 4,808 (vs. Whitehaven R.L.F.C., 1 October)
- Low attendance: 3,004 (vs. Blackpool Panthers, 26 February)
← 2005	List of seasons	2007 →

The 2006 Widnes Vikings season was their first in the 2006 Rugby League National Leagues since their relegation from the Super League the previous season. The Widnes Vikings aimed for immediate promotion back to the top tier eventually finishing second in the league and making it to the Grand Final. They ultimately fell short of this goal being defeated by Hull Kingston Rovers by 29 points to 16.

== 2006 fixtures and results ==
LEGEND
Win
Draw
Loss

2006 National League One Results

Date	Competition	Vrs	H/A	Result	Score	Tries	Goals	Field goals	Att	Lineup	Subs	
9/4/06	National League 1	York City Knights	H	W	25-18	Reid, Nanyn (2), Marsh	Nanyn 4/4	Smith	4,024	Daryl Cardiss, Gavin Dodd, Damien Reid, Mick Nanyn, John Kirkpatrick, James Coyle, Jamie Durbin, Terry O'Connor, Bob Beswick, Barrie McDermott, Mick Cassidy, Dave Allen, Mark Smith	Aaron Summers, Danny Heaton, Lee Marsh, Rob Draper	-
14/4/06	National League 1	Leigh Centurions	A	L	53-4	N/A	Nanyn 2/2	N/A	3,761	Daryl Cardiss, John Kirkpatrick, Gavin Dodd, Mick Nanyn, Lucas Onyango, Lee Marsh, James Coyle, Terry O'Connor, Bob Beswick, Barrie McDermott, Mick Cassidy, Dave Allen, Mark Smith	Aaron Summers, Danny Heaton, Jamie Durbin, Damien Reid	-
17/4/06	National League 1	Batley Bulldogs	H	W	52-6	Coyle, Cardiss, Marsh, Nanyn (4), Heaton, Peachey, Kirkpatrick	Nanyn 6/10	N/A	3,098	David Peachey, Gavin Dodd, Daryl Cardiss, Mick Nanyn, Lucas Onyango, Lee Marsh, James Coyle, Terry O'Connor, Mick Cassidy, Danny Heaton, Mark Smith	Aaron Summers, John Kirkpatrick, Jamie Durbin, Stephen Nash	-
30/4/06	National League 1	Whitehaven	A	W	16-38	Paul O'Connor, Smith, Nanyn (3), Bowman	Nanyn 7/7	N/A	3,048	Gavin Dodd (Sin Bin - Professional Foul - 3rd Minute), John Kirkpatrick, Adam Bowman, Mick Nanyn, Paul O'Connor, James Coyle, Ian Watson, Terry O'Connor, Mark Smith, Barrie McDermott, Ryan Tandy, Dave Allen, Bob Beswick	Aaron Summers, Danny Heaton (Not Used), Paul Crook, Mick Cassidy	-
4/5/06	National League 1	Hull KR	H	L	28-42	Summers (2), Allen, Nanyn, Tandy	Nanyn 4/5	N/A	4,331	Miles Greenwood, Adam Bowman, Daryl Cardiss, Mick Nanyn, John Kirkpatrick, James Coyle, Ian Watson, Aaron Summers, Bob Beswick, Barrie McDermott, Mick Cassidy, Danny Heaton, Dave Allen	Paul Crook, Stephen Nash, Mark Smith, Ryan Tandy	-
4/6/06	National League 1	York City Knights	A	W	18-40	Dodd, Terry O'Connor, Nanyn, Moran (2), Smith (2)	Nanyn 6/7	N/A	1,563	Gavin Dodd, John Kirkpatrick, Adam Bowman, Mick Nanyn, Miles Greenwood, Dennis Moran, Ian Watson, Terry O'Connor, Mark Smith, Barrie McDermott, Jordan James, Oliver Wilkes, Bob Beswick	James Coyle, Mick Cassidy, Darren Woods, Ryan Tandy	-
11/6/06	National League 1	Doncaster Lakers	H	W	34-12	Smith, Beswick, Nanyn, Moran (3)	Nanyn 5/6	N/A	3,082	Gavin Dodd, John Kirkpatrick, Adam Bowman, Mick Nanyn, Miles Greenwood, Denis Moran, Ian Watson, Terry O'Connor, Mark Smith, Barrie McDermott, Jordan James, Oliver Wilkes, Bob Beswick	James Coyle, Mick Cassidy, Darren Woods, Ryan Tandy	-
25/6/06	National League 1	Batley Bulldogs	A	W	36-38	Cardiss, Kirkpatrick, Dodd, Tandy, James, Moran, Nanyn	Nanyn 5/7	N/A	1,227	Gavin Dodd, Adam Bowman, Daryl Cardiss, Mick Nanyn, John Kirkpatrick, Dennis Moran, James Coyle, Terry O'Connor, Mark Smith, Barrie McDermott, Jordan James, Oliver Wilkes, Bob Beswick	Darren Woods, Dave Allen, Mick Cassidy, Ryan Tandy	-
2/7/06	National League 1	Whitehaven	H	W	26-12	Nanyn, Moran, Beswick, Blanch	Nanyn 5/7	N/A	3,016	Gavin Dodd, Damien Blanch, Daryl Cardiss, John Kirkpatrick, Dennis Moran, James Coyle, Terry O'Connor, Mark Smith, Barrie McDermott, Oliver Wilkes, Jordan James, Bob Beswick	Adam Bowman, Dave Allen, Mick Cassidy, Ryan Tandy	-
9/7/06	National League 1	Oldham	H	W	72-18	Moran (3), Dodd (3), Dave Allen (2), Nanyn (3), Cardiss, Blanch	Nanyn 10/13	N/A	3,213	Gavin Dodd, Damien Blanch, Daryl Cardiss, Mick Nanyn, John Kirkpatrick, Dennis Moran, James Coyle, Terry O'Connor, Mark Smith, Barrie McDermott, Jordan James, Dave Allen, Bob Beswick	Aaron Summers, Mick Cassidy, Adam Bowman, Ryan Tandy	-
15/7/06	National League 1	Rochdale Hornets	A	W	38-46	Nanyn (2), Blanch, Smith (2), Allen, Dodd, Wilkes	Nanyn 7/8	N/A	1,232	Gavin Dodd, Damien Blanch, Daryl Cardiss, Mick Nanyn, John Kirkpatrick, Dennis Moran, James Coyle, Terry O'Connor, Mark Smith, Ryan Tandy, Jordan James, Dave Allen, Bob Beswick	Aaron Summers, Mick Cassidy, Ian Watson, Oliver Wilkes	-
23/7/06	National League 1	Hull KR	A	L	49-24	Smith (2), Terry O'Connor, Gleeson, Allen	Nanyn 1/4, Moran 1/1	N/A	4,128	Daryl Cardiss (Sin Bin - 51st Minute - Holding Down), Gavin Dodd, Sean Gleeson, Mick Nanyn, Damien Blanch, Dennis Moran, Ian Watson, Terry O'Connor, Mark Smith, Ryan Tandy, Jordan James, Dave Allen, Bob Beswick	Aaron Summers, Oliver Wilkes (Sin Bin - 39th Minute - Late Tackle), James Coyle, Barrie McDermott	-
30/7/06	National League 1	Halifax	A	W	22-42	Dodd, Blanch, James, Allen (2), Smith	Nanyn 7/7	N/A	1,752	Gavin Dodd, Damien Blanch, Sean Gleeson, Mick Nanyn, John Kirkpatrick, Dennis Moran, Ian Watson, Terry O'Connor, Mark Smith, Ryan Tandy, Jordan James, Oliver Wilkes, Bob Beswick	Aaron Summers, Dave Allen, James Coyle, Barrie McDermott	-
6/8/06	National League 1	Rochdale Hornets	H	L	18-31	Dodd, Terry O'Connor, Bob Beswick	Dodd 3/3	N/A	3,362	Gavin Dodd, Damien Blanch, Sean Gleeson, Daryl Cardiss, John Kirkpatrick, Dennis Moran, Ian Watson, Terry O'Connor, Mark Smith, Ryan Tandy, Jordan James, Oliver Wilkes, Bob Beswick	Aaron Summers, Mick Cassidy, James Coyle, Barrie McDermott	-
13/8/06	National League 1	Leigh Centurions	H	W	32-16	Gleeson (2), Nanyn, Moran, Cassidy	Nanyn 6/6	N/A	3,759	Gavin Dodd, Damien Blanch, Sean Gleeson, Mick Nanyn, Daryl Cardiss, Dennis Moran, Ian Watson, Terry O'Connor, Mark Smith, Barrie McDermott (Sin Bin - 2nd Minute - High Tackle), Mick Cassidy, Oliver Wilkes, Bob Beswick	James Coyle, Dave Allen, Jordan James, Ryan Tandy	-
20/8/06	National League 1	Oldham	A	W	28-78	Moran (4), Terry O'Connor, Gleeson, Nanyn (2), Smith, James (2), Cardiss, Cassidy, Tandy	Nanyn 11/14	N/A	1,099	Gary Hulse, Sean Gleeson, Bob Beswick, Mick Nanyn, Daryl Cardiss, Dennis Moran, Ian Watson, Terry O'Connor, Mark Smith, Barrie McDermott, Mick Cassidy, Oliver Wilkes, Dave Allen	Aaron Summers, Jordan James, James Coyle, Ryan Tandy	-
3/9/06	National League 1	Doncaster Lakers	A	W	0-56	Wilkes, Nanyn, Smith (3), Moran, Blanch, Kirkpatrick, Allen, Cardiss	Nanyn 8/10	N/A	1,214	Daryl Cardiss, Damien Blanch, Sean Gleeson, Mick Nanyn, John Kirkpatrick, Dennis Moran, Ian Watson, Terry O'Connor, Mark Smith, Ryan Tandy, Mick Cassidy, Oliver Wilkes, Bob Beswick	Aaron Summers, Dave Allen, James Coyle, Jordan James	-
10/9/06	National League 1	Halifax	H	W	76-34	Kirkpatrick (2), Tandy (2), Moran, Allen, Smith (2), Gleeson, McDermott (2), Beswick, Blanch	Nanyn 11/12, McDermott 1/1	N/A	3,781	Daryl Cardiss, Damien Blanch, Sean Gleeson, Mick Nanyn, John Kirkpatrick, Dennis Moran, Ian Watson, Barrie McDermott, Mark Smith, Ryan Tandy, Mick Cassidy, Oliver Wilkes, Bob Beswick	James Coyle, Dave Allen, Jordan James, Aaron Summers	-
24/9/06	National League 1 Playoffs - Qualifying Semi Final	Hull HR	A	L	29-22	Blanch, Cardiss, Summers, Smith	Nanyn 1/2, Dodd 2/3	N/A	6,872	Gavin Dodd, Damien Blanch, Sean Gleeson, Mick Nanyn, Daryl Cardiss, Dennis Moran, Ian Watson, Ryan Tandy, Mark Smith, Barrie McDermott, Mick Cassidy, Oliver Wilkes, Bob Beswick	Aaron Summers, Dave Allen, James Coyle, Jordan James	-
1/10/06	National League 1 Playoffs - Final Eliminator	Whitehaven	H	W	24-20	Smith, Blanch, Dodd, Gleeson	Dodd 4/5	N/A	4,808	Gavin Dodd, Damien Blanch, Sean Gleeson, Daryl Cardiss, John Kirkpatrick, Dennis Moran, Ian Watson, Terry O'Connor, Mark Smith, Barrie McDermott, Mick Cassidy, Dave Allen, Bob Beswick	Aaron Summers, Jordan James, James Coyle, Ryan Tandy	-
8/10/06	National League 1 Grand Final	Hull KR	Neutral	L	29-16	Dodd, Tandy, Blanch	Dodd 2/3	N/A	13,024	Gavin Dodd, Damien Blanch, Sean Gleeson, Daryl Cardiss, John Kirkpatrick, Dennis Moran, Ian Watson, Terry O'Connor, Mark Smith, Barrie McDermott, Mick Cassidy, Dave Allen, Bob Beswick	Aaron Summers, Oliver Wilkes, Jordan James, Ryan Tandy	-

2006 Challenge Cup Results

Date	Competition	Vrs	H/A	Result	Score	Tries	Goals	Field goals	Att	Lineup	Subs	
9/3/06	CC Round 3	Hunslet Warriors	A	W	0-38	Dodd, Peachey, Onyango, Smith (2), Cardiss, Nanyn, Reid	Nanyn 3/8	N/A	1,308	David Peachey, Gavin Dodd, Daryl Cardiss, Mick Nanyn, Lucas Onyango, James Coyle, Jamie Durbin, Terry O'Connor, Bob Beswick, Aaron Summers, Mick Cassidy, Danny Heaton, Mark Smith	Damien Reid, Lee Marsh, Stephen Nash, Paul Alcock	-
2/4/06	CC Round 4	Castleford Tigers	H	W	14-4	Peachey (2)	Nanyn 3/3	N/A	4,205	David Peachey, Gavin Dodd, Daryl Cardiss, Mick Nanyn, Lucas Onyango, James Coyle, Jamie Durbin, Terry O'Connor, Bob Beswick, Barrie McDermott, Mick Cassidy, Dave Allen, Mark Smith	Aaron Summers, Danny Heaton, Damien Reid, Stephen Nash	-
21/5/06	CC Round 5	Catalans Dragons	H	L	16-34	Nanyn (2), Smith	Nanyn 2/3	N/A	3,014	Daryl Cardiss, Darren Woods, Adam Bowman, Mick Nanyn, Paul O'Connor, Paul Crook, James Coyle, Aaron Summers, Mark Smith, Barrie McDermott, Mick Cassidy, Rob Draper, Bob Beswick	Phil Wood, Danny Heaton, Matt Strong, Stephen Nash	-

2006 National League Cup

Group 4
Team	Pld	W	D	L	PF	PA	PD	Pts
Leigh Centurions	6	5	0	1	174	80	+94	10
Widnes Vikings	6	4	0	2	230	96	+134	8
Swinton Lions	6	3	0	3	132	152	−20	6
Blackpool Panthers	6	0	0	6	56	264	−208	0

Date	Competition	Vrs	H/A	Result	Score	Tries	Goals	Field goals	Att	Lineup	Subs	
12/2/06	2006 National League Cup - Group 4	Swinton Lions	H	W	18-10	Cassidy, Smith (2)	Nanyn 3/3	N/A	3,887	David Peachey, Paul O'Connor, Darren Woods, Mick Nanyn, Gavin Dodd, Bob Beswick, James Coyle, Terry O'Connor, Mark Smith, Aaron Summers, Mick Cassidy, Dave Allen, Lee Marsh	Lucas Onyango (Not Used), Danny Heaton, Paul Crook, Dayne Donoghue	-
19/2/06	2006 National League Cup - Group 4	Leigh Centurions	A	L	27-20	Beswick, Peachey, McDermott, Lee Marsh	Nanyn 1/1, Marsh 1/3	N/A	4,045	David Peachey, Paul O'Connor, Gavin Dodd, Mick Nanyn, Darren Woods, Bob Beswick, James Coyle, Terry O'Connor, Mark Smith, Barrie McDermott, Mick Cassidy, Danny Heaton, Dave Allen	Dayne Donoghue, Lee Marsh, Aaron Summers, Paul Crook	-
26/2/06	2006 National League Cup - Group 4	Blackpool Panthers	H	W	76-6	Dodd, Peachey (2), Cardiss, Marsh (3), Onyango (3), Coyle, Reid, Smith (2)	Marsh 10/14	N/A	3,004	David Peachey, Daryl Cardiss, Damien Reid, Gavin Dodd, Lucas Onyango, Lee Marsh, James Coyle, Terry O'Connor, Bob Beswick, Barrie McDermott, Mick Cassidy, Danny Heaton, Dave Allen	Aaron Summers, Mark Smith, Jamie Durbin, Dayne Donoghue	-
7/3/06	2006 National League Cup - Group 4	Leigh Centurions	H	L	10-25	Smith, Paul Alcock	Smith 1/1, Beswick 0/1	N/A	4,133	David Peachey, Paul O'Connor, Damien Reid, Gavin Dodd, Lucas Onyango, Lee Marsh, James Coyle, Terry O'Connor, Mark Smith, Barrie McDermott, Mick Cassidy, Danny Heaton, Dave Allen	Aaron Summers, Bob Beswick, Jamie Durbin, Paul Alcock	-
19/3/06	2006 National League Cup - Group 4	Swinton Lions	A	W	16-64	Peachey (3), Cardiss, Nanyn, Durbin, Smith, Onyango (2), Cassidy, Coyle, McDermott	Nanyn 3/6, Dodd 1/2, Marsh 4/4	N/A	1,016	David Peachey, Gavin Dodd, Daryl Cardiss, Mick Nanyn, Lucas Onyango, James Coyle, Jamie Durbin, Terry O'Connor, Bob Beswick, Barrie McDermott, Mick Cassidy, Dave Allen, Mark Smith	Damien Reid, Lee Marsh, Stephen Nash, Danny Heaton	-
28/3/06	2006 National League Cup - Group 4	Blackpool Panthers	A	W	12-42	McDermott, Nanyn, Allen, Cardiss, Damien Reid (2), Heaton	Nanyn 7/7	N/A	1,017	Gavin Dodd, Daryl Cardiss, Damien Reid, Mick Nanyn, Lucas Onyango, James Coyle, Jamie Durbin, Terry O'Connor, Bob Beswick, Barrie McDermott, Danny Heaton, Dave Allen, Mark Smith	Paul Crook, Paul Alcock, Rob Draper, Stephen Nash	-

Date	Competition	Vrs	H/A	Result	Score	Tries	Goals	Field goals	Att	Lineup	Subs	
23/4/06	2006 National League Cup - Quarter Final Qualifying Round	Barrow Raiders	A	W	22-40	Nanyn (2), Summers, Coyle (2), Kirkpatrick (2)	Nanyn 6/7	N/A	1,437	David Peachey, Gavin Dodd, Damien Reid, Mick Nanyn, John Kirkpatrick, Lee Marsh, James Coyle, Aaron Summers, Bob Beswick, Barrie McDermott, Mick Cassidy, Danny Heaton, Mark Smith	Paul Crook, Stephen Nash, Adam Bowman, Ryan Tandy	-
7/5/06	2006 National League Cup - Quarter Final	Leigh Centurions	H	L	12-54	Cardiss, Crook	Watson 1/1, Crook 1/1	N/A	3,534	Gavin Dodd, John Kirkpatrick, Adam Bowman, Daryl Cardiss, Paul O'Connor, James Coyle, Ian Watson, Terry O'Connor, Mark Smith, Mick Cassidy, Ryan Tandy, Dave Allen, Bob Beswick	Paul Crook, Danny Heaton, Stephen Nash, Adam Sidlow	-

== 2006 squad ==
Name	D.O.B.	Apps	League Apps	Tries	League Tries	Goals	League Goals	Field goals	League Field Goals	Pts
Paul Alcock	12/11/82	(3)	1	0	0	0	0	0	0	3
Dave Allen	15/9/85	18 (7)	10 (7)	10	9	0	0	0	0	40
Bob Beswick	8/12/84	31 (1)	21	5	4	0	0	0	0	20
Damien Blanch	24/5/83	12	12	9	9	0	0	0	0	36
Adam Bowman	12/11/87	7 (3)	5 (2)	1	1	0	0	0	0	4
Daryl Cardiss	13/7/77	24	17	11	6	0	0	0	0	44
Mick Cassidy	8/7/73	21 (8)	11 (8)	4	2	0	0	0	0	16
James Coyle	28/12/85	20 (11)	9 (11)	6	1	0	0	0	0	24
Paul Crook	28/8/86	1 (7)	(2)	0	0	1	0	0	0	2
Gavin Dodd	28/8/86	27	17	12	10	12	11	0	0	72
Dayne Donoghue	22/9/88	(3)	0	0	0	0	0	0	0	0
Jamie Durbin	7/9/84	5 (4)	1 (2)	1	0	0	0	0	0	4
Sean Gleeson	29/11/87	10	10	6	6	0	0	0	0	24
Miles Greenwood	30/7/87	3	3	0	0	0	0	0	0	0
Danny Heaton	19/4/81	8 (7)	2 (2)	2	1	0	0	0	0	8
Gary Hulse	20/1/81	1	1	0	0	0	0	0	0	0
Jordan James	24/5/80	9 (7)	9 (7)	4	4	0	0	0	0	16
John Kirkpatrick	3/1/79	18 (1)	16 (1)	7	5	0	0	0	0	28
Lee Marsh	5/3/83	6 (4)	2 (1)	6	2	16	0	0	0	56
Barrie McDermott	22/7/72	24 (3)	16 (3)	5	2	1	1	0	0	22
Dennis Moran	22/1/77	16	16	18	18	1	1	0	0	74
Mick Nanyn	3/6/82	26	18	30	23	134	106	0	0	388
Stephen Nash	14/1/86	(9)	(2)	0	0	0	0	0	0	0
Paul O'Connor	3/6/84	6	1	1	1	0	0	0	0	4
Terry O'Connor	13/10/71	27	18	4	4	0	0	0	0	16
Lucas Onyango	12/4/81	8	2	6	0	0	0	0	0	24
David Peachey	21/1/74	9	1	10	1	0	0	0	0	40
Damien Reid	14/3/84	5 (4)	1 (1)	5	1	0	0	0	0	20
Adam Sidlow	25/10/87	(1)	0	0	0	0	0	0	0	0
Mark Smith	18/8/81	30 (2)	20 (1)	26	17	0	0	1	1	105
Matt Strong	17/2/87	(1)	0	0	0	0	0	0	0	0
Aaron Summers	11/8/81	5 (19)	1 (15)	4	3	0	0	0	0	16
Ryan Tandy	20/9/81	9 (11)	8 (10)	6	6	0	0	0	0	24
Ian Watson	27/10/76	15 (1)	14 (1)	0	0	1	0	0	0	2
Oliver Wilkes	2/5/80	11(3)	11(3)	2	2	0	0	0	0	8
Phil Wood	25/10/83	(1)	0	0	0	0	0	0	0	0
Darren Woods	24/3/84	3 (3)	(3)	0	0	0	0	0	0	0
