= 2003 Halifax R.L.F.C. season =

- Super League VIII Rank: 12th
- Challenge Cup: Fourth round
- 2003 record: Wins: 1; draws: 0; losses: 28
- Points scored: For: 388; against: 1251

Team information
- Coach: Tony Anderson
- Stadium: The Shay
← 2002	List of seasons

The 2003 Halifax RLFC season was the 108th season in the club's rugby league history and the eighth season in the Super League. Coached by Tony Anderson, Halifax competed in Super League VIII and finished in 12th place, relegating the club to National League One. The club also reached the fourth round of the Challenge Cup.

== Table ==
Pos	Team	Pld	W	D	L	PF	PA	PD	Pts	Qualification
1	Bradford Bulls (L, C)	28	22	0	6	878	529	+349	44	Semi-final
2	Leeds Rhinos	28	19	3	6	751	555	+196	41	Semi-final
3	Wigan Warriors	28	19	2	7	776	512	+264	40	Elimination play-offs
4	St Helens	28	16	1	11	845	535	+310	31 (Note: St Helens deducted 2 points for salary cap breaches.)	Elimination play-offs
5	London Broncos	28	14	2	12	643	696	−53	30	Elimination play-offs
6	Warrington Wolves	28	14	1	13	748	619	+129	29	Elimination play-offs
7	Hull F.C.	28	13	3	12	701	577	+124	27 (Note: Hull F.C. deducted 2 points for salary cap breaches.)	
8	Castleford Tigers	28	12	1	15	612	633	−21	25	
9	Widnes Vikings	28	12	1	15	640	727	−87	25	
10	Huddersfield Giants	28	11	1	16	628	715	−87	23	
11	Wakefield Trinity Wildcats	28	7	1	20	505	774	−269	15	
12	Halifax (R)	28	1	0	27	372	1227	−855	0 (Note: Halifax deducted 2 points for salary cap breaches.)	Relegation to National League One

Source: Rugby League Project
Rules for classification: 1) Points; 2) Points difference; 3) Number of points scored;
(C) Champions; (L) League Leaders' Shield Winners; (R) Relegated

== Squad ==
No	Player
1	Darryl Cardiss
2	Lee Greenwood
3	Stuart Donlan
4	Danny Halliwell
5	Lee Finnerty
6	Martin Moana
7	Sean Penkywicz
8	Andy Hobson
9	Johnny Lawless
10	Paul Davidson
11	Heath Cruckshank
12	Andrew Brocklehurst
13	Shayne McMenemy
14	Liam Finn
15	Ryan Clayton
16	Chris Birchall
17	Anthony Seuseu
18	Jaymes Chapman
19	John Kirkpatrick
20	Dane Dorahy
21	Chris Norman
22	Simon Grix
23	Ged Corcoran
24	Wayne Corcoran
25	Neil Harmon
26	John Hill
27	Chris Maye
29	Byron Smith
30	Rikki Sheriffe
31	Brad Attwood
32	Danny Jones
33	Andrew Frew

== 2003 fixtures and results ==
LEGEND
Win
Draw
Loss

2003 Super League Results

Date	Competition	Vrs	H/A	Result	Score	HT Score	Tries	Goals	Field goals	Att	Lineup	Subs	
23/02/03	Super League VIII	London Broncos	A	W	22-26	14-12	Finnerty (9), Dorahy (12), Brocklehurst (51), Birchall (57)	Dorahy 5/5	N/A	3,022	Lee Finnerty, Lee Greenwood, Stuart Donlan, Danny Halliwell, Chris Norman, Martin Moana, Dane Dorahy, Andy Hobson, Johnny Lawless (C), Chris Birchall, Heath Cruckshank, Andrew Brocklehurst, Shayne McMenemy	Sean Penkywicz (Not Used), Paul Davidson, Ryan Clayton, Anthony Seuseu	-
7/03/03	Super League VIII	Castleford Tigers	H	L	10-20	8-8	Dorahy (7)	Dorahy 3/3	N/A	4,388	Lee Finnerty, Lee Greenwood, Stuart Donlan, Ryan Clayton, Chris Norman, Martin Moana, Dane Dorahy, Andy Hobson, Johnny Lawless (C), Chris Birchall, Heath Cruckshank, Andrew Brocklehurst, Shayne McMenemy	Daryl Cardiss, Sean Penkywicz, Paul Davidson, Anthony Seuseu	-
23/03/03	Super League VIII	Bradford Bulls	A	L	62-22	24-10	Moana (6), Clayton (34), Greenwood (66), Dorahy	Dorahy 3/4	N/A	15,557	Lee Finnerty, Danny Halliwell, Ryan Clayton, Stuart Donlan, Lee Greenwood, Martin Moana, Dane Dorahy, Andy Hobson, Johnny Lawless (C), Paul Davidson, Heath Cruckshank, Andrew Brocklehurst, Shayne McMenemy	Daryl Cardiss, Sean Penkywicz, Chris Birchall, Anthony Seuseu	-
28/03/03	Super League VIII	Leeds Rhinos	H	L	14-20	6-8	Donlan (7), Dorahy (75)	Dorahy 3/4	N/A	4,073	Lee Finnerty, Lee Greenwood, Stuart Donlan, Ryan Clayton, Danny Halliwell, Martin Moana, Dane Dorahy, Andy Hobson, Johnny Lawless (C), Chris Birchall, Heath Cruckshank, Andrew Brocklehurst, Shayne McMenemy	Daryl Cardiss, Sean Penkywicz, Paul Davidson, Anthony Seuseu	-
6/04/03	Super League VIII	Widnes Vikings	A	L	44-16	14-16	Cardiss (32), Seuseu (52), Dorahy (79)	Dorahy 2/3	N/A	7,135	Daryl Cardiss, Lee Greenwood, Ryan Clayton, Stuart Donlan, Chris Norman, Martin Moana, Dane Dorahy, Andy Hobson, Johnny Lawless (C), Chris Birchall, Heath Cruckshank, Andrew Brocklehurst, Shayne McMenemy	Sean Penkywicz, Paul Davidson, Anthony Seuseu, Liam Finn	-
18/04/03	Super League VIII	Huddersfield Giants	H	L	20-21	2-14	Clayton (45), Davidson (57), Donlan (66)	Dorahy 4/4	N/A	4,616	Daryl Cardiss, Andrew Frew, Ryan Clayton, Stuart Donlan, Lee Greenwood, Martin Moana, Dane Dorahy, Andy Hobson, Johnny Lawless (C), Chris Birchall, Heath Cruckshank, Andrew Brocklehurst, Shayne McMenemy	Danny Halliwell, Sean Penkywicz, Paul Davidson, Anthony Seuseu	-
21/04/03	Super League VIII	Hull F.C.	A	L	46-18	20-8	Frew (35), Dorahy (53), Clayton (78)	Dorahy 3/4	N/A	9,070	Daryl Cardiss, Andrew Frew, Ryan Clayton, Stuart Donlan, Lee Finnerty, Dane Dorahy, Sean Penkywicz, Anthony Seuseu, Johnny Lawless (C), Paul Davidson, Heath Cruckshank, Andrew Brocklehurst, Martin Moana	Danny Halliwell, Andy Hobson, Chris Birchall, Ged Corcoran	-
2/05/03	Super League VIII	St Helens R.F.C.	H	L	0-38	0-12	N/A	N/A	N/A	3,372	Daryl Cardiss, Lee Greenwood, Danny Halliwell, Stuart Donlan, Lee Finnerty, Martin Moana, Dane Dorahy, Andy Hobson, Johnny Lawless (C), Chris Birchall, Heath Cruckshank, Andrew Brocklehurst, Shayne McMenemy	Paul Davidson, Liam Finn, Ryan Clayton, Anthony Seuseu	-
9/05/03	Super League VIII	Warrington Wolves	H	L	8-38	2-16	Cardiss (58)	Dorahy 2/2	N/A	3,174	Daryl Cardiss, Lee Greenwood, Ryan Clayton, Stuart Donlan, Andrew Frew, Martin Moana, Dane Dorahy, Andy Hobson, Johnny Lawless (C), Chris Birchall, Heath Cruckshank, Andrew Brocklehurst, Shayne McMenemy	Paul Davidson, Danny Halliwell, Sean Penkywicz, Anthony Seuseu	-
16/05/03	Super League VIII	Wakefield Trinity	A	L	22-18	12-8	Penkywicz (23), Finn (71), Greenwood (75)	Dorahy 2/2	N/A	2,806	Lee Finnerty, Andrew Frew, Stuart Donlan, Ryan Clayton, Lee Greenwood, Dane Dorahy, Sean Penkywicz, Andy Hobson, Johnny Lawless (C), Paul Davidson, Heath Cruckshank, Andrew Brocklehurst, Martin Moana	Danny Halliwell, Liam Finn, Chris Birchall, Anthony Seuseu	-
30/05/03	Super League VIII	Wigan Warriors	A	L	58-12	22-2	Birchall (72), Chapman (79)	Dorahy 1/1, Finnerty 1/2	N/A	7,393	Lee Finnerty, Andrew Frew, Ryan Clayton, Stuart Donlan, Lee Greenwood, Dane Dorahy, Sean Penkywicz, Andy Hobson, Johnny Lawless (C), Chris Birchall, Heath Cruckshank, Andrew Brocklehurst, Martin Moana	Danny Halliwell, Paul Davidson, Jaymes Chapman, Anthony Seuseu	-
30/05/03	Super League VIII	Hull F.C.	H	L	10-60	0-30	Frew (47), Lawless (76)	Dorahy 1/1, Finn 0/1	N/A	3,143	Lee Finnerty, Lee Greenwood, Ryan Clayton, Andrew Frew, John Kirkpatrick, Dane Dorahy, Sean Penkywicz, Andy Hobson, Johnny Lawless (C), Chris Birchall, Heath Cruckshank, Andrew Brocklehurst, Liam Finn	Paul Davidson, Anthony Seuseu, Jaymes Chapman, Chris Norman	-
8/05/03	Super League VIII	Huddersfield Giants	A	L	28-26	18-12	Penkywicz (26), Finn (35), Davidson (60), Frew (79)	Dorahy 5/5	N/A	3,980	Daryl Cardiss, John Kirkpatrick, Andrew Frew, Ryan Clayton, Lee Greenwood, Dane Dorahy, Sean Penkywicz, Andy Hobson, Johnny Lawless (C), Chris Birchall, Shayne McMenemy, Andrew Brocklehurst, Liam Finn	Lee Finnerty, Heath Cruckshank, Paul Davidson, Neil Harmon	
14/06/03	Super League VIII	Widnes Vikings	H	L	20-48	12-21	Finnerty (17), Norman (35), Penkywicz (69)	Finn 3/4, Finnerty 1/1	N/A	1,919	Lee Finnerty, Lee Greenwood, Ryan Clayton, Andrew Frew, John Kirkpatrick, Liam Finn, Daryl Cardiss, Andy Hobson, Johnny Lawless (C), Chris Birchall, Heath Cruckshank, Andrew Brocklehurst, Shayne McMenemy	Sean Penkywicz, Paul Davidson, Chris Norman, Neil Harmon	-
20/06/03	Super League VIII	St Helens R.F.C.	A	L	58-2	22-2	N/A	Finn 1/1	N/A	7,891	Daryl Cardiss, Lee Finnerty, Andrew Frew, Chris Norman, Lee Greenwood, Liam Finn, Sean Penkywicz, Neil Harmon, Johnny Lawless (C), Paul Davidson, Heath Cruckshank, Andrew Brocklehurst, Ryan Clayton	Andy Hobson, Chris Birchall, Simon Grix, Ged Corcoran	-
28/06/03	Super League VIII	London Broncos	H	L	16-50	10-26	Clayton (9), Kirkpatrick (23), Frew (47)	Dorahy 2/3	N/A	1,781	Dane Dorahy, Lee Greenwood, Ryan Clayton, Andrew Frew, John Kirkpatrick, Simon Grix, Sean Penkywicz, Andy Hobson, Johnny Lawless (C), Neil Harmon, Heath Cruckshank, Andrew Brocklehurst, Martin Moana	Lee Finnerty, Paul Davidson, Chris Norman, Chris Birchall	-\
6/07/03	Super League VIII	Castleford Tigers	A	L	38-12	12-12	Frew (14), Dorahy (20)	Dorahy 2/3	N/A	5,444	Daryl Cardiss, Lee Greenwood, Stuart Donlan, Andrew Frew, Chris Norman, Dane Dorahy, Sean Penkywicz, Chris Birchall, Johnny Lawless (C), Neil Harmon, Ryan Clayton, Andrew Brocklehurst, Martin Moana	Andy Hobson, Jaymes Chapman, Simon Grix, Ged Corcoran	-
11/07/03	Super League VIII	Bradford Bulls	H	L	12-60	6-34	Clayton (33), Hobson (61)	Dorahy 2/3	N/A	4,555	Daryl Cardiss, Lee Greenwood, Stuart Donlan, Ryan Clayton, Andrew Frew, Dane Dorahy, Sean Penkywicz, Neil Harmon, Johnny Lawless (C), Chris Birchall, Heath Cruckshank, Andrew Brocklehurst, Martin Moana	Andy Hobson, Jaymes Chapman, Simon Grix, Ged Corcoran	-
