= Aaron Summers =

Aaron Summers may refer to:

- Aaron Summers (cricketer) (born 1996), Australian cricketer
- Aaron Summers (rugby league) (born 1981), Welsh rugby league player
- Aaron Summers (speedway rider) (born 1988), Australian speedway rider
