= Kyle Eastmond =

England dual-code international rugby footballer

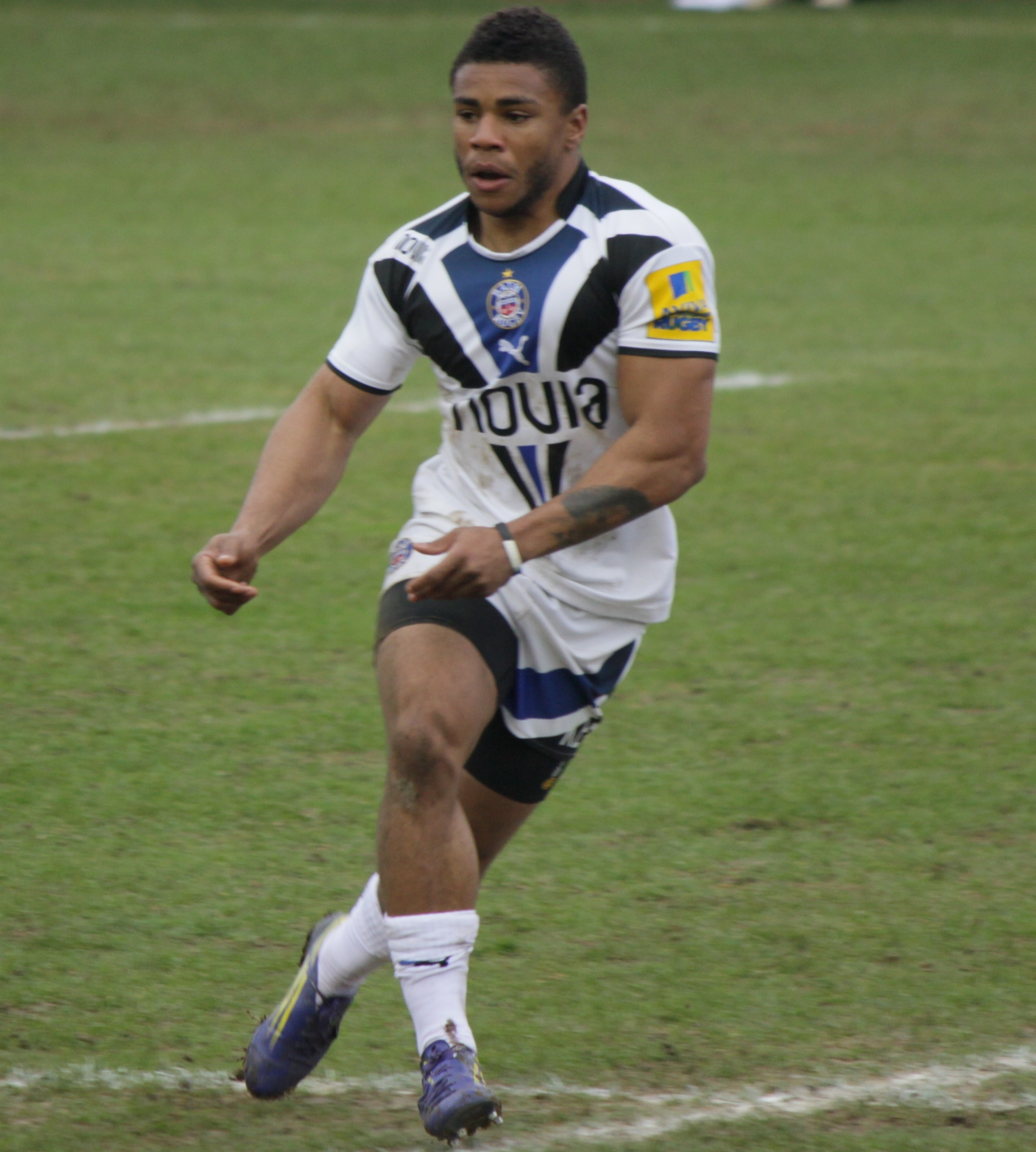

Personal information
- Full name: Kyle Ovid Eastmond
- Born: 17 July 1989 (age 37) Oldham, Greater Manchester, England
- Height: 5 ft 7 in (1.70 m)
- Weight: 14 st 13 lb (95 kg)

Playing information

Rugby league
- Position: Scrum-half, Stand-off, Centre, Fullback
Club
Years	Team	Pld	T	G	FG	P
2007–11	St Helens	74	39	137	3	433
2021	Leeds Rhinos	2	0	0	0	0
	Total	76	39	137	3	433
Representative
Years	Team	Pld	T	G	FG	P
2009	England	4	1	0	0	4

Rugby union
- Position: Centre, Fullback
Club
Years	Team	Pld	T	G	FG	P
2011–16	Bath	98	16	0	0	80
2016–18	Wasps	23	4	0	0	20
2018–20	Leicester Tigers	31	3	0	0	15
	Total	152	23	0	0	115
Representative
Years	Team	Pld	T	G	FG	P
2013–14	England	6	1	0	0	5

Coaching information
Club
Years	Team	Gms	W	D	L	W%
2025–	Halifax Panthers	55	25	1	29	45
- Source: As of 3 November 2026
- Education: The Radclyffe School
- Relatives: Craig Eastmond (cousin); Miles Greenwood (cousin)

Kyle Ovid Eastmond (born 17 July 1989) is professional rugby league coach who is the head coach of the Halifax Panthers in the RFL Championship and a former dual-code rugby international, who played for St Helens, Bath Rugby and Leicester Tigers. He also played for England on multiple occasions in both codes.

Eastmond played rugby union for Bath, Wasps and the Leicester Tigers in Premiership Rugby and England at international level. Prior to 2011 he played rugby league for St Helens in the Super League, and played for England at international level.

== Early life ==
Kyle attended the Parish Church CEVA School, Oldham and the Radclyffe School, Oldham.

Eastmond is the cousin of former professional rugby league footballer; Miles Greenwood. Kyle is also related to Sutton United's Craig Eastmond, who is his cousin. He has supported Manchester United since childhood.

== Rugby League career ==
=== Early career ===
During high school, Eastmond began his career by playing for the rugby league Oldham St Annes, but in 2007, Eastmond was promoted to training with the St Helens first team squad.

=== 2008-09 ===
In 2008, he was given the number 24 jersey and made a spectacular early impression in the traditional Good Friday fixture with Wigan, scoring a late try and a goal. He made 13 appearances in this season scoring 6 tries. He was then compared to Jason Robinson for his general attributes, and with his size finds it easy to duck under any oncoming opposition which helped him make 778m.

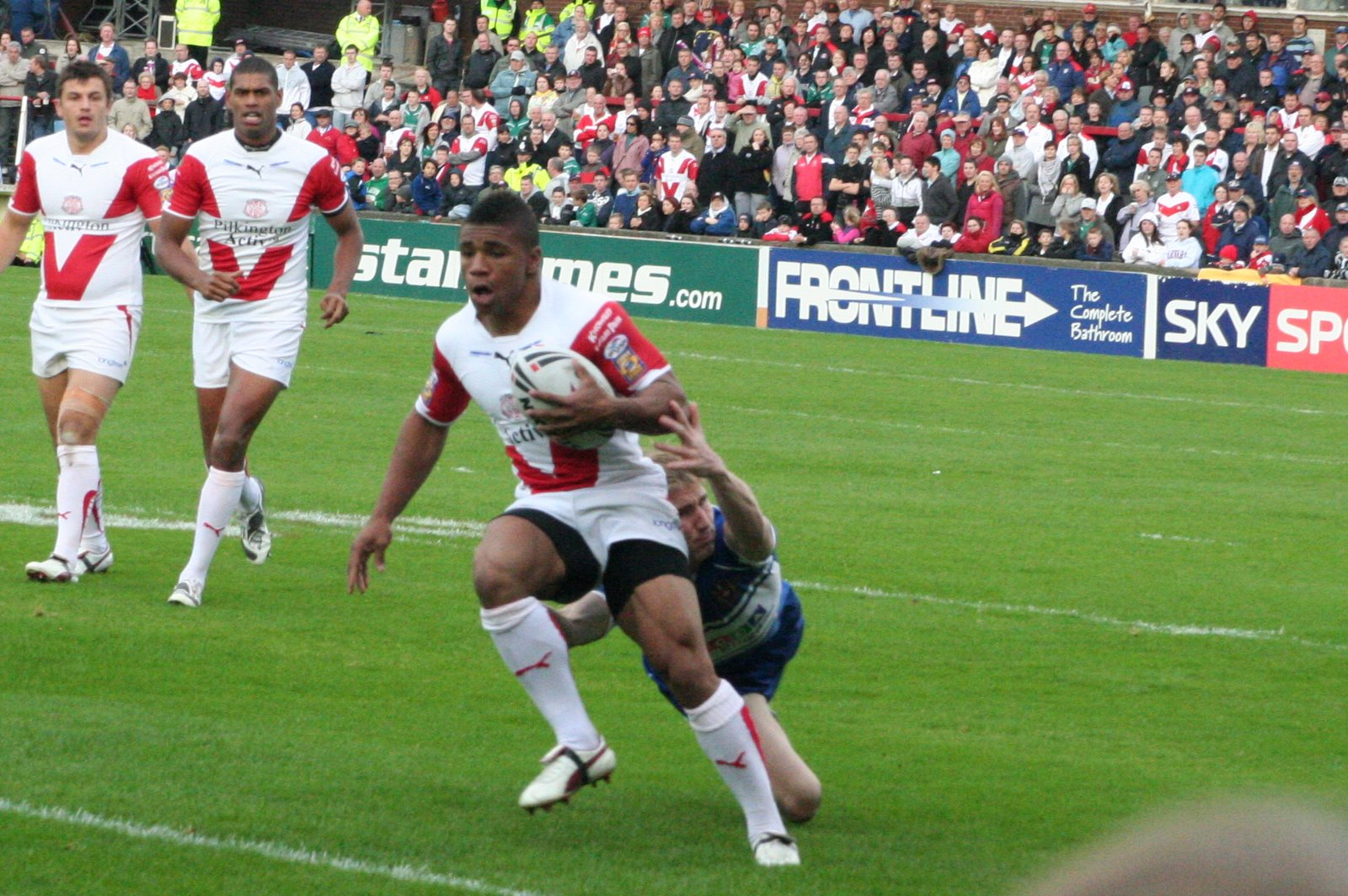
Eastmond playing for Saints against the Wigan Warriors

In 2009, Eastmond became an influential player for the St Helens side. He may have played one less game than in 2008, but he scored 8 tries, 30 goals (18 more than the previous year), seven try assists, he gained 899m and made more clean breaks.

Eastmond capped off an impressive year in 2009 by scoring all of Saints' 10 points in the 2009 Super League Grand Final defeat by Leeds at Old Trafford.

He was then selected for England in the 2009 Four Nations tournament and made his international début against Wales in a warm-up game. In December 2009, Eastmond signed a new two-year contract with St Helens that ended at the end of the 2011 Super League season.

=== 2010-11 ===
After Sean Long left St. Helens to join Hull F.C. at the end of the 2009 season, Kyle became the new number 7 for Saints. He started the year very well before injuries hit him for the 2nd half of the season. Despite this, he still managed to make 19 appearances, scoring 15 tries, 63 goal kicks (while missing 18) and making two drop goals. He made a total of 1615m. He repeatedly aggravated past injuries forcing him to miss the Grand Final defeat by Wigan. Matty Smith, now of Wigan, returned from his loan spell at Salford for the play-offs and featured in the final.

In early 2011 Eastmond was linked with a move to Rugby Union. He put these rumours on hold when he started the season with Saints. However, he performed poorly and frustrated fans. On 28 February 2011 both the Saints, and coach Royce Simmons, confirmed he was to leave Saints to join Bath Rugby. After the announcement, Eastmond promised to be 100% committed to his current club for the rest of the season. Commenting on the move, Bath Director of Rugby Sir Ian McGeechan said he envisions Eastmond playing at centre.

On 16 March 2011 it was announced on the St. Helens website that he had been suspended by the club pending an investigation into serious misconduct. The club followed this up by saying that no further comments were to be made until the completion of the investigation. It was later confirmed by the club that he had made an inappropriate gesture to his home fans, and it was unlikely he would ever play in the ‘Red V’ again, especially after the emergence of scrum-half sensation Jonny Lomax, and stand-off Lee Gaskell. He was dropped to the under-18s team but after injuries struck Saints, Eastmond was called on to fill in. He had to play under difficult circumstances, with Saints fans booing him with every touch of the ball. Despite this, he made a decent return. In July 2011 he successfully made the switch from the halfbacks to fullback, scoring two tries against Wakefield Trinity on 9 July. After that, Eastmond regained his confidence and was playing in a similar way to the 2008-09 seasons. He managed 15 appearances and scored five tries, but his workload was reduced to just four goal kicks (three missed kicks), due to Jamie Foster replacing him as the club's kicker.

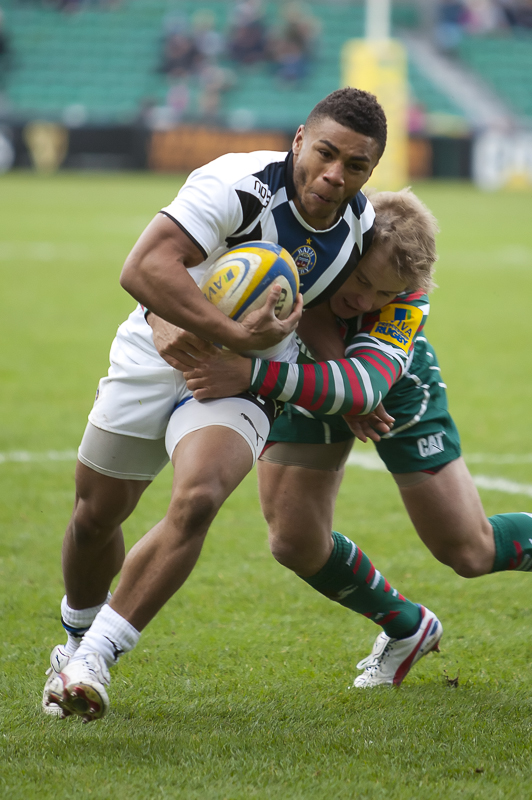
Eastmond playing for Bath, being tackled by Matthew Tait of the Leicester Tigers

=== Leeds Rhinos ===
On 3 March 2021 it was reported that he had signed for Leeds in the Super League, however, on 17 May he announced his immediate retirement from rugby having played only two games for his new club.

== Rugby Union career ==
=== Domestic ===
==== Bath ====
Eastmond joined Bath, when he moved in October 2011, after his contract finished at Saints. At Bath he played well and picked up Rugby Union quickly meaning that in 2013, Eastmond was selected to play for the England Saxons. During the 13/14 season, Eastmond formed a crucial partnership with George Ford, which led to Baths resurgence to the top of Aviva Premiership, he would then get selected for the main England side in the 2014 Autumn internationals but missed out on selection to England's World Cup squad to then Bath Club colleague Sam Burgess.

==== Wasps ====
After a poor season by the whole team after the World Cup he left Bath to join Wasps who were emerging as top team and had bought a new stadium in the Ricoh Arena, Coventry. His period with Wasps was blighted by injury, and resultantly playing second-choice often from the bench to other more reliable players.

==== Leicester ====
On 1 August 2018 Leicester Tigers announced the signing of Eastmond. He left ahead of the 2020–21 season.

=== International ===
==== England ====
Eastmond was selected in the England squad to tour America in the summer of 2013. He played his first game in the uncapped match against Barbarians on 26 May 2013, scoring a try shortly after coming off the bench as a replacement.

He won his first England cap as a replacement in the first test against Argentina.

Eastmond made his first start for England on 15 June 2013, replacing Lions call-up Billy Twelvetrees. He scored a try in the 51-26 victory over Argentina.

== Coaching career ==
=== Halifax Panthers ===
On 25 October 2024 he was announced as the new head coach of the Halifax Panthers.
