= Bob Beswick =

Ireland international rugby league footballer (born 1984)

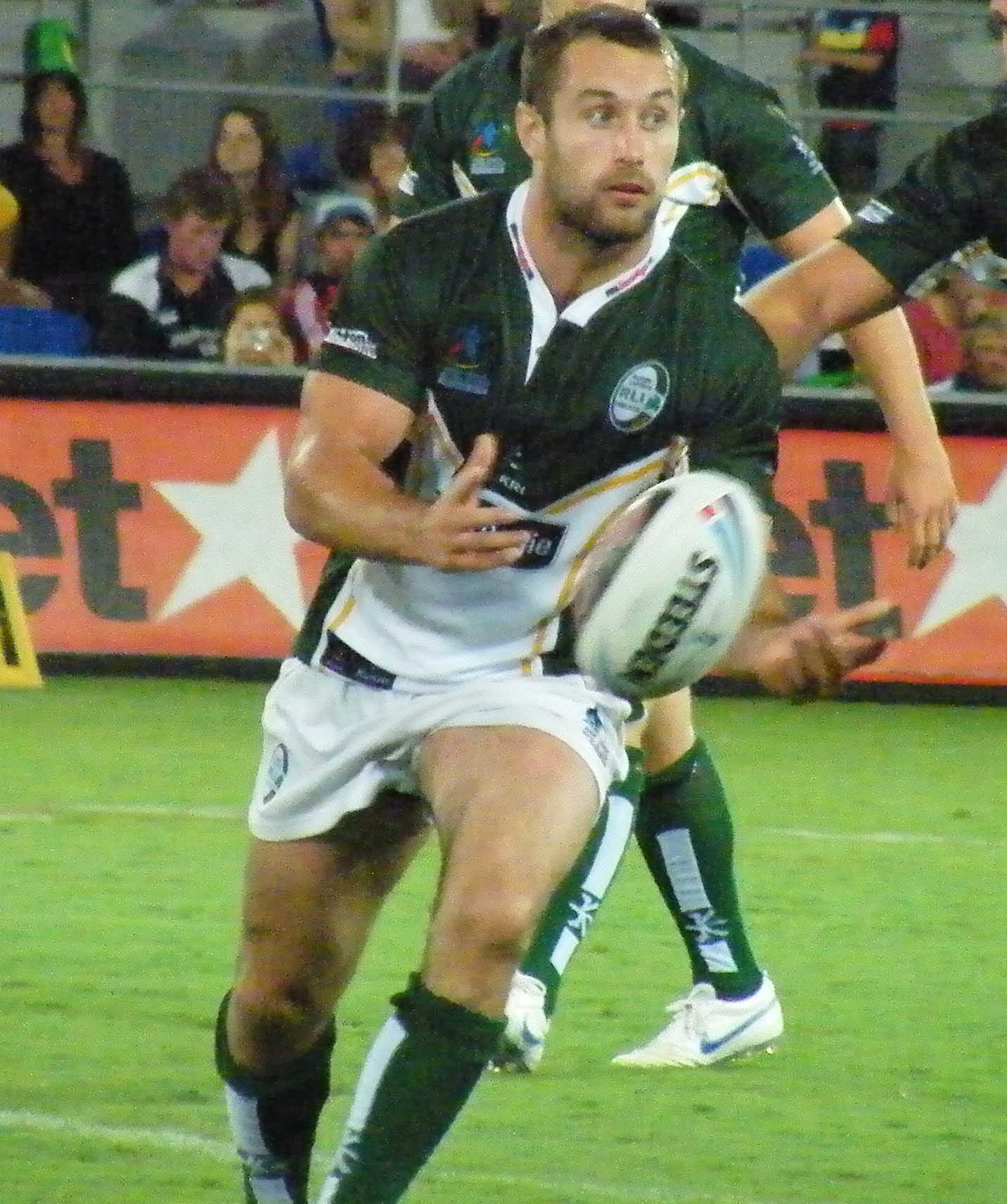

Personal information
- Full name: Robert James Beswick
- Born: 8 December 1984 (age 41) Wigan, Greater Manchester, England

Playing information
- Height: 5 ft 11 in (1.80 m)
- Weight: 14 st 9 lb (93 kg)
- Position: Hooker, Loose forward
Club
Years	Team	Pld	T	G	FG	P
2004–05	Wigan Warriors	22	2	0	0	8
2006–08	Widnes Vikings	94	18	0	1	73
2009–11	Halifax	87	21	0	1	85
2012–15	Leigh Centurions	123	18	0	1	73
2017–19	Toronto Wolfpack	65	19	0	0	76
2020–21	Newcastle Thunder	16	4	0	0	16
	Total	407	82	0	3	331
Representative
Years	Team	Pld	T	G	FG	P
2006–19	Ireland	26	3	0	0	12

Robert James Beswick (born 8 December 1984) is a former rugby league footballer who played as a hooker or loose forward. He started his professional career in 2004 with the Wigan Warriors in the Super League. He left the club in 2006 and spent the next ten seasons in the Championship with the Widnes Vikings, Halifax and the Leigh Centurions. In 2017, Beswick joined the Toronto Wolfpack and played in the club's inaugural league game before finishing his career with Newcastle Thunder. Beswick also represented at Ireland at international level, and was capped 26 times between 2006 and 2019.

== Background ==
Beswick was born in Wigan, Greater Manchester, England.

== Playing career ==
=== Club career ===
==== Early career ====
Beswick is a former Wigan St Patricks amateur and Deanery pupil, he played for Wigan's Academy U17s during the 2002 season. He played for the Wigan Academy U21s in 2003, winning the Academy Championship.

==== Wigan Warriors ====
Beswick was called up into the first team squad for 2004 after the departures of Paul Johnson and Shaun Briscoe due to salary cap restrictions. Wigan rugby executive Dean Bell said: "Bob is an exciting prospect, and his progression through to the first-team squad continues the policy of bringing young players through the ranks."

Beswick made his first team début in Terry O'Connor's Testimonial match against London Broncos. Despite becoming a first team regular during an injury hit 2005 campaign Beswick was released at the end of the season. He had made 22 competitive appearances for Wigan, scoring 2 tries.

==== Widnes Vikings ====
In October 2005, Bob signed a two-year contract at newly relegated Widnes Vikings.

In his first year with Widnes, Beswick earned a place in the 2006 National League One Dream Team.

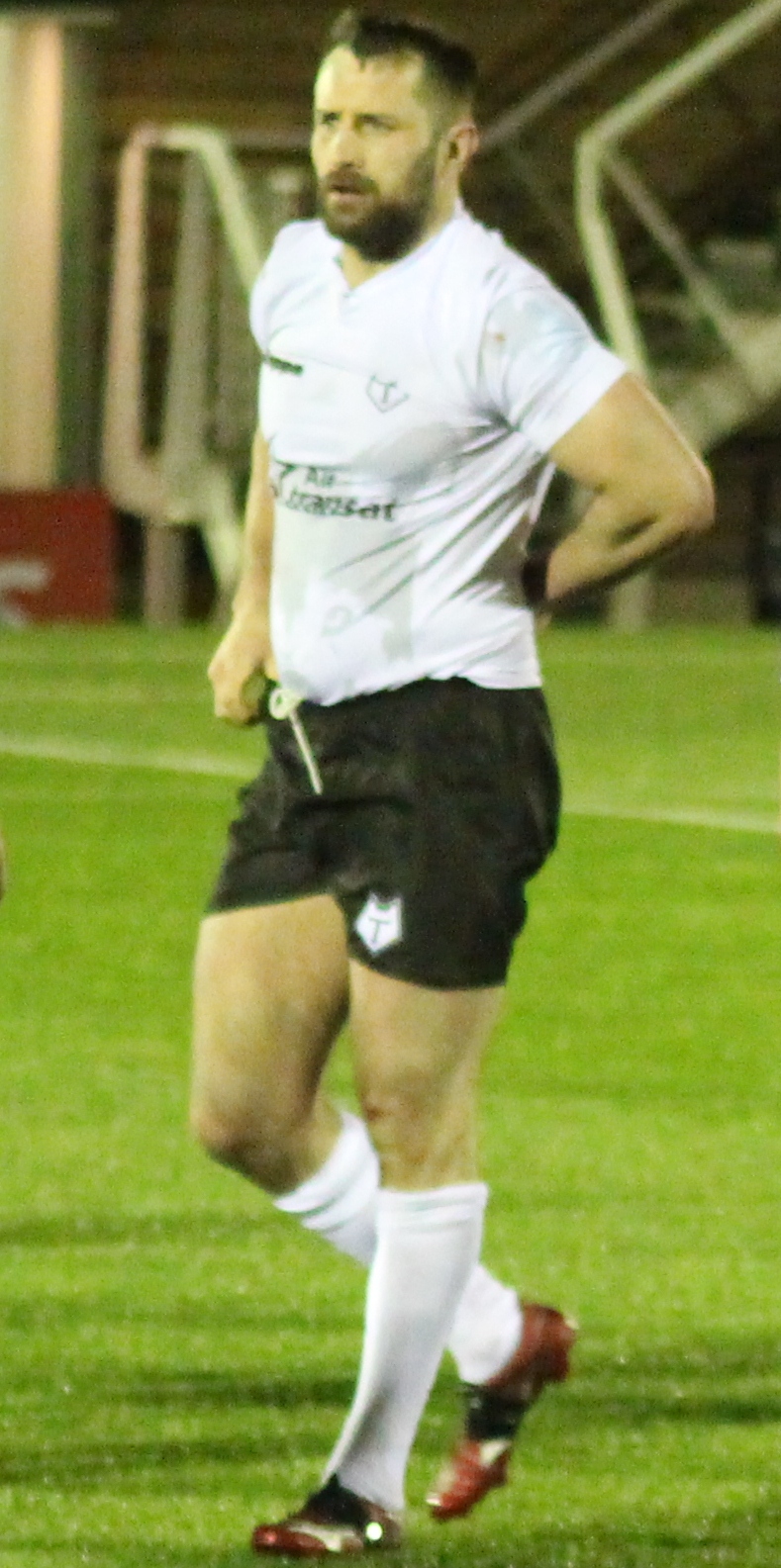
Beswick playing for the Pack

He continued to play for Widnes in 2007, scoring 5 tries in 23 games. He signed for Halifax after Widnes lost to Halifax in the National League One quarter-final playoff.

==== Halifax ====
He signed for Halifax in September 2008 for the 2009 season. Beswick featured on the losing side for Halifax in the 2011 Northern Rail Cup Final at Bloomfield Road, Blackpool against Leigh Centurions, before joining Leigh the following year for the 2012 season.

==== Leigh Centurions ====
While at Leigh, Beswick won the Championship title in 2014 and 2015. He was named in the Leigh squad for 2016 but did not feature for the club during the season.

==== Toronto Wolfpack ====
In 2016 it was announced that he would join Toronto Wolfpack for their inaugural season in 2017, also becoming the club's head of strength and conditioning.

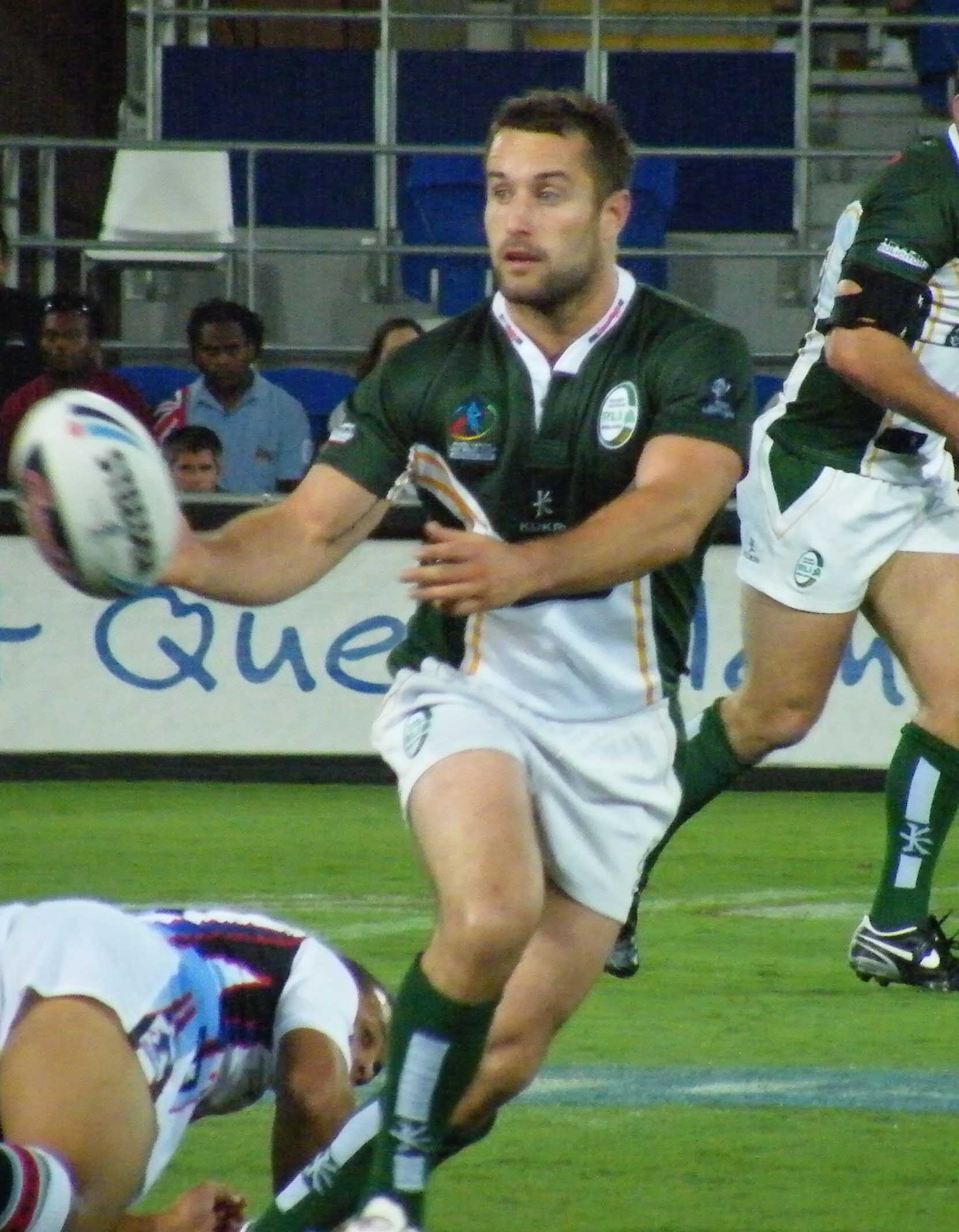
Bob Beswick playing for Ireland against Fiji at the 2008 Rugby League World Cup

=== International career ===
Beswick is an Ireland international.

He was named in the Ireland squad for the 2008 Rugby League World Cup.

He was named in the Ireland squad as captain for the 2009 European Nations Cup.

At the end of the 2014 season, Bob captained Ireland in the 2014 European Cup tournament.

At the conclusion of the 2015 season, he was the vice-captain of Ireland in the 2015 European Cup tournament.

In 2016 he was called up to the Ireland squad for the 2017 Rugby League World Cup European Pool B qualifiers.
