= Andrew Brocklehurst =

English former rugby league footballer

Andy Brocklehurst
Personal information
- Full name: Andrew Brocklehurst
- Born: 6 March 1983 (age 42)

Playing information
- Position: Second-row
Club
Years	Team	Pld	T	G	FG	P
2001–03	Halifax RLFC	48	2	0	0	8
2004	London Broncos	20	2	0	0	8
2004–08	Salford City Reds	78	10	0	0	40
2009	Barrow Raiders	18	3	2	0	14
	Total	164	17	2	0	70
- As of 27 March 2023

Andrew Brocklehurst (born 6 March 1983) is a former rugby league footballer who played as a second-row.

Brocklehurst joined Salford City Reds in 2004 from London Broncos. He has also played for Halifax and is a coach at his former amateur side.

In September 2008, it was announced that Brocklehurst had joined Barrow Raiders. On 30 June 2009, it was announced that his contract with Barrow Raiders had been terminated "following a serious breach of club discipline amounting to gross misconduct".
