= Dane Dorahy =

Australian rugby league footballer

Personal information
- Born: 17 December 1977 (age 47)

Playing information
- Height: 173 cm (5 ft 8 in)
- Weight: 86 kg (190 lb; 13 st 8 lb)
- Position: Fullback, Five-eighth, Halfback
Club
Years	Team	Pld	T	G	FG	P
1999	Western Suburbs	18	3	0	0	6
1999–00	Rochdale Hornets	27	9	34	2	106
2000–01	Wakefield Trinity Wildcats	23	4	19	1	55
2002	Hull Kingston Rovers	27	2	9	4	30
2003	Halifax	25	8	49	0	130
	Total	120	26	111	7	327
- Father: John Dorahy

Dane Dorahy (17 December 1977) is an Australian rugby league coach and former professional rugby league footballer.

He played as a fullback, five-eighth, or halfback in the 1990s and 2000s. He played at club level for Western Suburbs (Heritage No. 1052) in the NRL, the Wakefield Trinity Wildcats (Heritage No. 1165) and Halifax (Heritage No. 1172) in Super League, and the Rochdale Hornets and Hull Kingston Rovers (Heritage No. 1013) in the Championship.

== Background ==
Dorahy is the son of former international rugby league player and coach, John Dorahy.

== Coaching career ==
Dorahy took up a coaching role with the Wests Tigers in 2007, where he spent two seasons, before moving to the Illawarra Cutters. In 2021, he took the head coach role for South Sydney Rabbitohs' reserve grade, where he took them from last position, to just missing out on Top 5. 2023 Dane became assistant coach / mentor for St. George Illawarra Dragons' under-21s.

On 9 August 2023, the Castleford Tigers announced the appointment of Dorahy as an assistant coach on a short-term basis until the end of the season. He joined the Tigers alongside new head coach Danny Ward following the departure of Andy Last, and would work with existing coaches Craig Lingard and Scott Murrell. With six games remaining and Castleford level on points at the bottom of the table, the new coaching staff were tasked with securing Super League status. Key victories against Wakefield and Hull FC saw the Tigers narrowly survive, and Dorahy departed following the conclusion of the season.

== Sources ==
- Alan Whiticker & Glen Hudson (2007). The Encyclopedia of Rugby League Players. Wetherill Park, New South Wales: Gary Allen Pty Ltd. ISBN 978-1-877082-93-1.
