= Andy Hobson =

English rugby league footballer

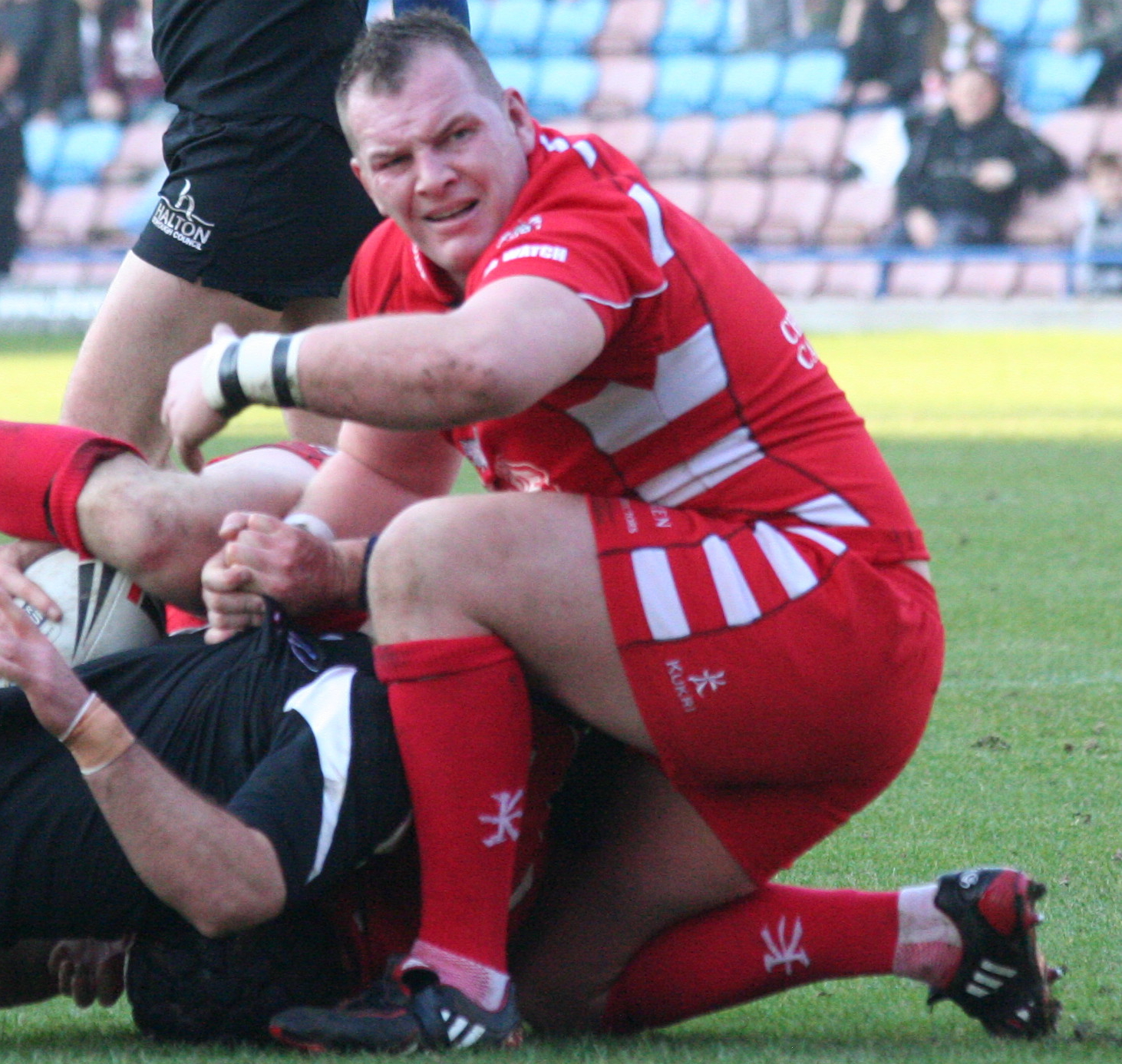

Personal information
- Full name: Andrew Hobson
- Born: 26 December 1978 (age 47)

Playing information
- Position: Prop
Club
| Years | Team | Pld | T | G | FG | P |
|---|---|---|---|---|---|---|
| 1998–2003 | Halifax |
| 2004 | Widnes Vikings |
| 2007 | Dewsbury Rams |
| 2008–09 | Leigh Centurions |
| 2010 | Blackpool Panthers |
| | Total | 0 | 0 | 0 | 0 | 0 |

Andrew Hobson (born 26 December 1978) is a British former professional rugby league footballer who played in the 1990s, 2000s and 2010s. He played at club level for the Stanley Rangers ARLFC, Halifax, the Widnes Vikings, the Dewsbury Rams, the Leigh Centurions, and the Blackpool Panthers, as a prop.

== Club career ==
Andy Hobson played for Halifax in 1998's Super League III, 1999's Super League IV, 2000's Super League V, 2001's Super League VI, 2002's Super League VII, 2003's Super League VIII, and Widnes in 2004's Super League IX.
