= Barrie McDermott =

English rugby league footballer (born 1972)

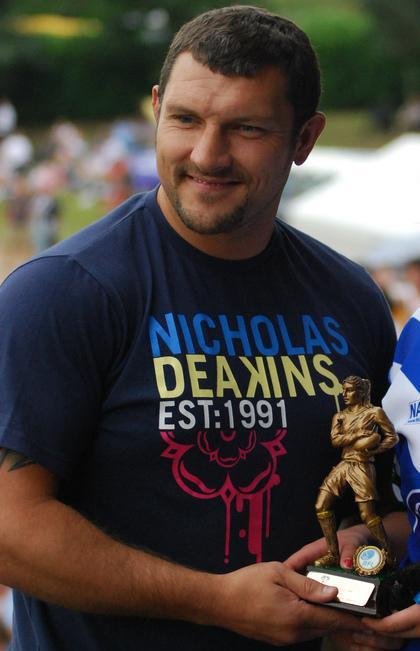

Personal information
- Full name: Barrie McDermott
- Born: 22 July 1972 (age 53) Oldham, Lancashire, England

Playing information
- Height: 5 ft 10 in (178 cm)
- Weight: 17 st 5 lb (110 kg)
- Position: Prop
Club
Years	Team	Pld	T	G	FG	P
1991–94	Oldham	40	6	0	0	24
1994–95	Wigan	13	4	0	0	16
1995–05	Leeds Rhinos	283	40	0	0	160
1997(loan)	→ Bramley	4	1	0	0	4
2006	Widnes Vikings	27	5	1	0	22
	Total	367	56	1	0	226
Representative
Years	Team	Pld	T	G	FG	P
2001–02	Lancashire	3	0	0	0	0
1996	England	1	0	0	0	0
2000–05	Ireland	13	2	0	0	8
1994–03	Great Britain	15	0	0	0	0

Barrie McDermott (born 22 July 1972) is a former professional rugby league footballer who played as a prop in the 1990s and 2000s.

A Great Britain international representative prop, he played his club football at Oldham, Wigan, the Leeds Rhinos (with whom he won both a Super League Championship and Challenge Cup Final), Bramley and the Widnes Vikings.

McDermott later became the Head of Youth Development with his former club, Leeds Rhinos, and appears as a pundit on Sky Sports. In 2006 Barrie McDermott was included in the Southstander.com Hall of Fame.

== Background ==
McDermott was born in Oldham, Lancashire, England.

== Playing career ==
=== 1990s ===
A native of Oldham, McDermott started out with his hometown club before transferring to Wigan, where he won a championship and represented Great Britain. He had originally wished to join the army but was unable to do so after an accident with an air rifle that caused him to lose an eye. His early career was marked by his aggressive playing style, knocking out Paul Sironen with a high elbow during a tour match for Wigan in October 1994. After a two-match ban, McDermott made his Test debut off the bench in the opening match of the Ashes series, a victory against Australia at Wembley. McDermott played in the remaining two matches as Australia won the series, and would earn 15 caps with Great Britain.

Barrie McDermott played as a substitute in Wigan's 1994–95 Regal Trophy victory, a 40–10 win over Warrington, and in the 1995–96 Final, a 25–16 victory over St. Helens.

McDermott joined Leeds in 1996, and made his sole England appearance in a European Championship victory over Wales at Cardiff Arms Park that autumn. He missed the Rhinos' 1998 Grand Final defeat against his previous club, but was a try-scorer in the 52—16 Challenge Cup final victory over the London Broncos, the club's first Challenge Cup final victory for 21 years. During the 1997 season, McDermott spent a few weeks as a loan player with Bramley.

=== 2000s ===
McDermott first represented Ireland at the 2000 Rugby League World Cup, later earning 13 caps with the Irish side, and also represented Lancashire in the Origin Series. His autobiography, Made for Rugby was published in 2004. McDermott become only the 22nd Leeds player to win the league championship and the Challenge Cup in 2004 when he played for the Leeds Rhinos from the interchange bench in their 2004 Super League Grand Final victory against the Bradford Bulls.

In his final season with Leeds, McDermott opened the season with a testimonial match against Oldham, then helped Leeds to lift the 2005 World Club Challenge. The Rhinos beat the National Rugby League champions Canterbury Bulldogs in front of 37,028 at Elland Road, a record crowd for a World Club Challenge held in Britain. Leeds also reached the 2005 Challenge Cup final, losing by a point to Hull F.C. at Cardiff's Millennium Stadium, and finished the season with another final defeat, against Bradford Bulls in the Super League Grand Final at Old Trafford.

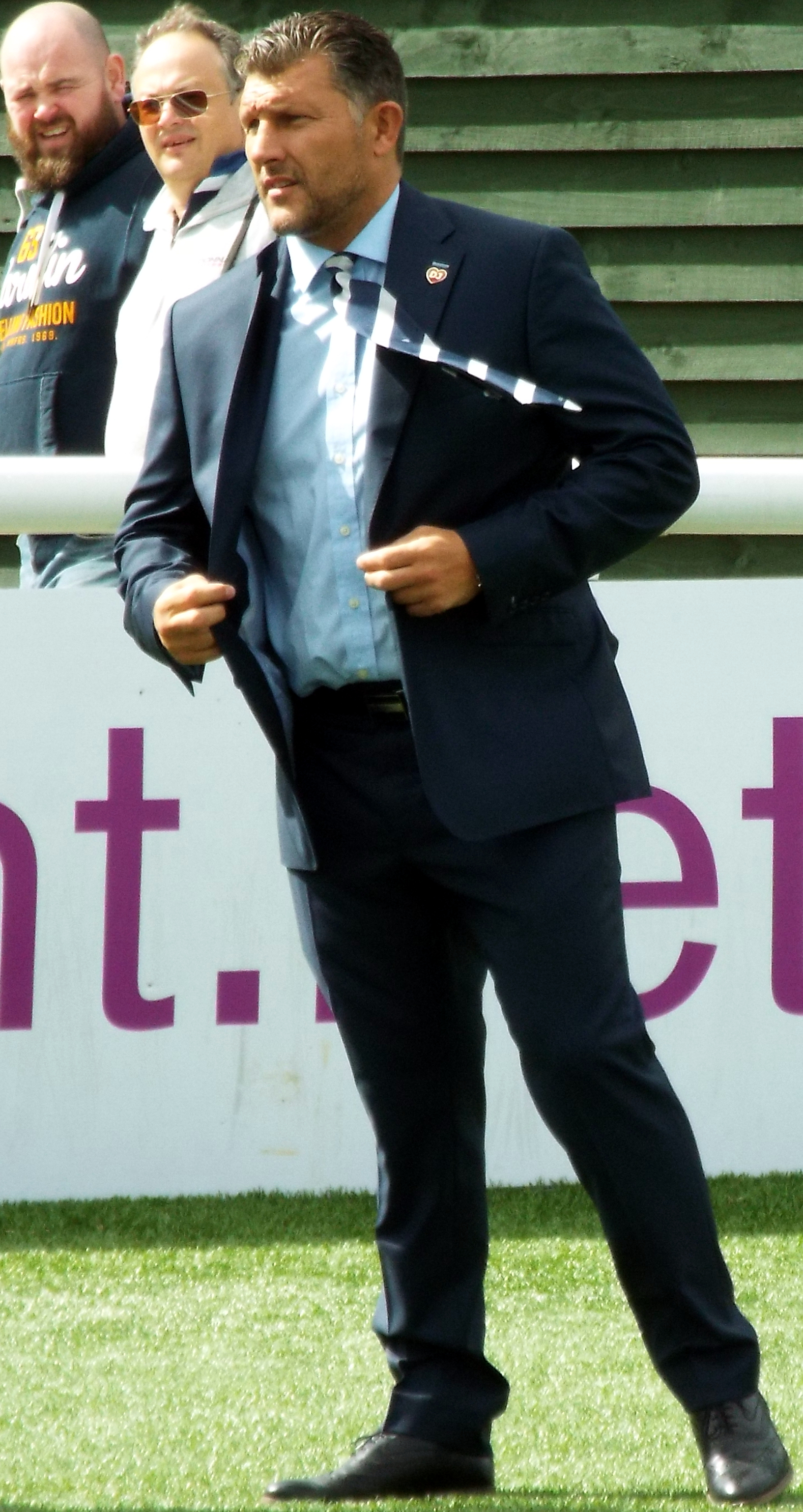
McDermott in 2016.

Barrie played in 2 Grand Finals, 3 Challenge Cup Finals and a World Club Challenge. He won 1 Grand Final winners ring, a Challenge Cup winners medal and a World Club Challenge winners medal. Barrie played 283 games for Leeds scoring 40 tries including 1 hat-trick. Although he announced his retirement from the game at the end of 2005's Super League X, McDermott played another year with the Widnes Vikings in Northern League One. After a season playing with his good friend Terry O'Connor he finally retired in 2006.

== Post playing ==
Following retirement, Barrie initially worked in a community role at Leeds Rhinos before joining the Leeds coaching setup where he is currently the Head of Youth Development. He regularly works for Sky Sports, both as a pundit at live games and as an off-field character where he regularly appears in light-hearted features with long-time friend Terry O'Connor. He is also involved in Leeds' corporate entertainment division on match days.

Even after his playing career was over, McDermott remained involved with the Challenge Cup. Leeds Metropolitan University, who were the main sponsors of the event in 2009, announced him as their official "Carnegie Ambassador" for the 2009 Challenge Cup.
