= Tony Anderson (rugby league) =

Australian former rugby league player & cpach

Personal information
- Born: 23 July 1961 (age 64); Australia

Playing information
- Position: Centre
Club
Years	Team	Pld	T	G	FG	P
1984–90	Halifax	135	64	0	0	256
1990–91	Oldham	20	3	0	0	12
1991–93	Bradford Northern	55	12	0	0	48
	Total	210	79	0	0	316

Coaching information
Club
Years	Team	Gms	W	D	L	W%
2002–04	Halifax	28	8	0	20	29

Tony Anderson (born 23 July 1961) is an Australian former rugby league footballer and coach. He played as a centre for English clubs Halifax, Oldham (Heritage No 956) and Bradford Northern. He was also Halifax's head coach between 2002 and 2004.

== Playing career ==
Born in Australia, Anderson began his rugby league career in his home country before moving to England in 1984, signing for Halifax. He was part of the Halifax team which won the 1985–86 League championship. Anderson also helped Halifax reach the 1988 Challenge Cup final, scoring the only try in a 4–3 win against Hull in their semi-final replay at Elland Road, Leeds. He also scored in the final itself at Wembley, but Halifax lost the match 12–32 against Wigan.

Anderson was transferred to Oldham in March 1990 for a fee of £70,000. He finished his playing career at Bradford Northern.

== Coaching career ==
In 1993, Anderson ended his playing career and moved into coaching. His first appointment was on the coaching staff at Huddersfield, working as the club's Alliance team coach. After spending time on the coaching staff at Halifax, Anderson accepted a position as assistant coach to Shaun McRae at newly formed club Gateshead Thunder in 1998. Anderson was also McRae's assistant at Hull for several seasons.

Anderson returned to Halifax as head coach in August 2002. He helped the club remain in the Super League during the 2002 season, but could not prevent relegation the following year, with Halifax only winning one game during the entire season. He was sacked in April 2004.
