= Miles Greenwood =

English rugby league footballer

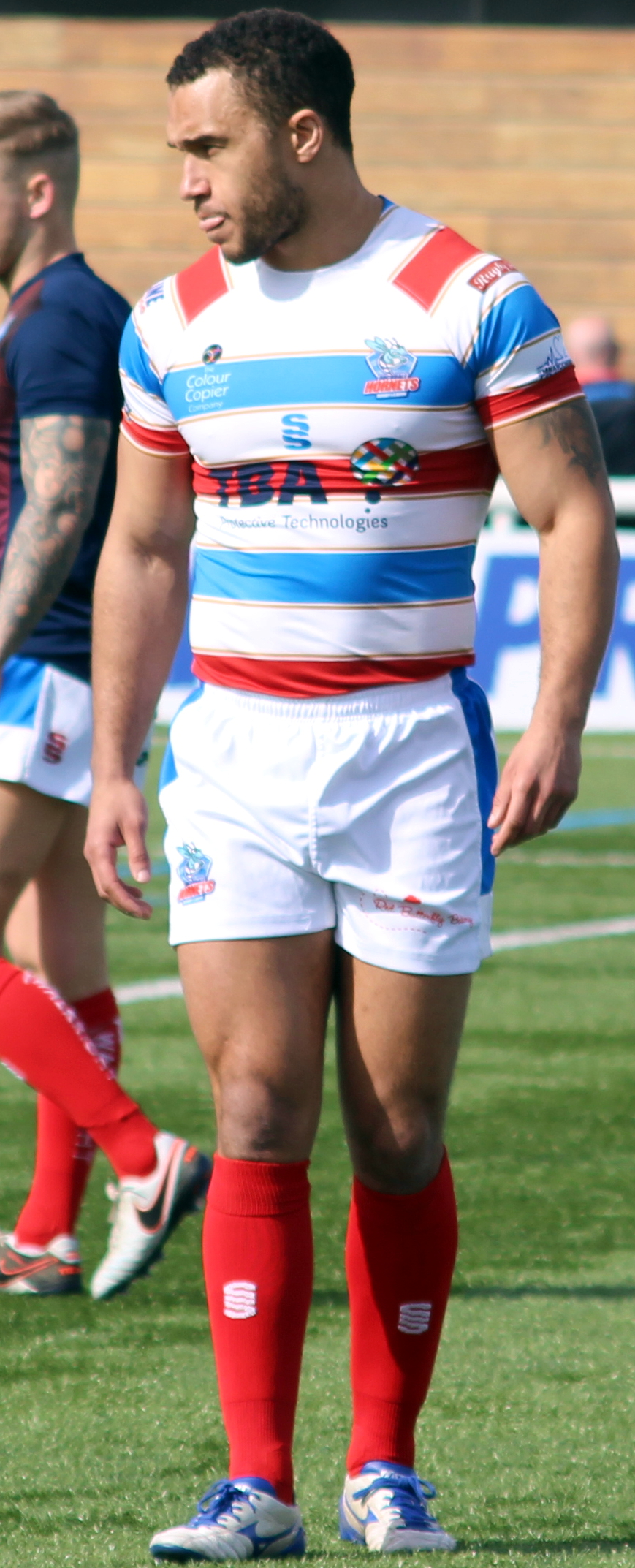

Personal information
- Full name: Miles Greenwood
- Born: 30 August 1987 (age 37); Oldham, Greater Manchester, England

Playing information
- Height: 5 ft 10 in (1.78 m)
- Weight: 13 st 9 lb (87 kg)
- Position: Fullback, Wing
Club
Years	Team	Pld	T	G	FG	P
2006	St Helens	0	0	0	0	0
2006 (loan)	→ Widnes Vikings	3	0	0	0	0
2007	Leigh Centurions	26	16	0	0	64
2008–11	Halifax	80	38	0	0	152
2012	Oldham	25	20	0	0	80
2013–14	Batley Bulldogs	53	41	0	0	164
2015–16	Halifax	22	10	0	0	40
2017–18	Rochdale Hornets	20	5	0	0	20
	Total	229	130	0	0	520
- Relatives: Kyle Eastmond (cousin); Craig Eastmond (cousin)

Miles Greenwood (born 30 August 1987, in Oldham, Greater Manchester) is an English former professional rugby league footballer who played as a fullback or winger for the Leigh Centurions, Halifax, Batley Bulldogs and the Rochdale Hornets in the Championship.

== Playing career ==
Greenwood came through the junior systems of Oldham and St Helens.

He has spent time on loan at the Widnes Vikings and has previously played for the Leigh Centurions, Oldham R.L.F.C., Batley Bulldogs and Halifax.

Greenwood is the cousin of England dual code international Kyle Eastmond.
