= Dave Allen (rugby league) =

English rugby league footballer

Personal information
- Full name: David Allen

Playing information
- Position: Wing, Centre, Second-row, Loose forward
Club
Years	Team	Pld	T	G	FG	P
1981	Widnes
1981–84	Fulham RLFC	108	34	0	0	107
1984–86	Warrington	18	0	0	0	0
	Total	126	34	0	0	107
- Source: As of 8 December 2016

Dave Allen is a former professional rugby league footballer who played in the 1980s. He played at club level for Widnes, Fulham RLFC, and Warrington Wolves, as a fullback, centre, second-row, or loose forward.
