= Damien Reid =

Scotland international rugby league footballer

Personal information
- Full name: Damien Reid

Playing information
- Position: Centre
Club
Years	Team	Pld	T	G	FG	P
≤2003	Gateshead Thunder
≤2004	Barrow Raiders
2004–05	Castleford Tigers
2006	Widnes Vikings	9	5
≤2007–10	Sheffield Eagles
2010	Rochdale Hornets
	Total	9	5	0	0	0
Representative
Years	Team	Pld	T	G	FG	P
2003	Scotland	1

Damien Reid is a professional rugby league footballer who played as a centre in the 2000s. He played at representative level for Scotland, and at club level for the Gateshead Thunder, Barrow Raiders, Castleford Tigers, Widnes Vikings, Sheffield Eagles and the Rochdale Hornets.

== International honours ==
Damien Reid won a cap for Scotland while at Gateshead Thunder 2003 1-cap.
