= James Coyle (rugby league) =

English RL coach and former Ireland international rugby league footballer

Personal information
- Full name: James Anthony Coyle
- Born: 28 December 1985 (age 39) Wigan, Greater Manchester, England
- Height: 1.78 m (5 ft 10 in)
- Weight: 95 kg (14 st 13 lb)

Playing information
- Position: Scrum-half
Club
Years	Team	Pld	T	G	FG	P
2005	Wigan Warriors	6	1	0	0	4
2006	Widnes Vikings	31	6	0	0	24
2007–09	Oldham	71	37	8	0	164
2009–11	Barrow Raiders	32	14	0	0	56
2011	Widnes Vikings	6	0	0	0	0
2013	Workington Town	7	2	0	0	8
2013–14	Hunslet Hawks	22	3	2	3	19
	Total	175	63	10	3	275
Representative
Years	Team	Pld	T	G	FG	P
2009	Ireland	3	0	0	0	0

Coaching information
Club
Years	Team	Gms	W	D	L	W%
2014–16	Whitehaven
2016–17	Hunslet
	Total	0	0	0	0
- Source: As of 26 March 2021
- Relatives: Thomas Coyle (brother)

James Coyle (born 28 December 1985) is an Ireland international rugby league coach and former player.

== Playing career ==
Coyle played for Wigan St Patricks as half back and St John Fisher pupil. In 2002 and 2003 he played in the Wigan's Academy setup and was the Senior Academy Player of the Year for 2003 Under 21s.

Coyle captained the 2003 England Academy U17s squad that beat the Australian Institute of Sport for the first time. Coyle was also selected for the 2004 Academy Origin Series.

He was included in the Wigan Warriors first team squad for the first time in 2005 his first appearance being off the bench against Hull F.C. Coyle made his full début the next weekend against Whitehaven in the Challenge Cup, and had a man-of-the-match winning performance. Coach Denis Betts commented of his performance: "James is a really good player, as he showed when he started to carry the ball and create space in the second half. He started to become the player I believe he can be." In 2005 he was awarded Wigan Supporters' Association Under 21s Player of the Season award.

As a 19 year old in 2005 Coyle signed with the Widnes Vikings. where he spent a season before returning to Wigan's Academy in 2007. Later in 2007 he moved to Oldham then on to Barrow in 2011.

Coyle was unattached and signed for the 2012 season with Championship side Workington Town on a one-year contract. In mid 2013 he signed with Hunslet Hawks RLFC.

He moved to Whitehaven in late 2014 and retired from playing at the end of 2015.

== Coaching career ==
In October 2014 Coyle joined Whitehaven as caretaker coach/player. In 2015 he was appointed coach for the rest of the 2015 season. Coyle was in the shortlist of nominations for the 2015 Kingstone Press Championships and League 1 Awards for Championship Coach of the Year with Whitehaven but was unsuccessful. Coyle announced that he would not be coaching in 2017 due to other commitments but in August 2016, with Whitehaven coming last in the competition with five wins from 25 games and in danger of relegation from Championship Shield to League 1, the Board of Directors sacked Coyle as coach. After being sacked from Whitehaven RLFC he was named as Hunslet RLFC head coach in September 2016 after Matt Bramald when his contract expired.

== Personal life ==
Coyle's family have a long association with Wigan. Both his father Bernard Coyle, Jr. (1970's) and grandfather, Bernard Coyle, Snr. (1940s) played scrum-half for Wigan. His younger brother, Thomas, also played for Wigan and on occasion played for the same clubs as James.

== Career statistics ==
Club	Season											
Club	Season	League	All Apps	League Apps	All Tries	League Tries	All Goals	League Goals	All Field Goals	League Field Goals	All Points	League Points
Wigan Warriors	2005	Super League X	6	5	1	1	0	0	0	0	4	4
Widnes Vikings (Loan)	2006	National League One	31	20	6	1	0	0	0	0	24	4
Oldham	2007	National League Two	14	14	6	6	0	0	0	0	24	24
Oldham	2008	National League Two	37	25	21	10	3	3	0	0	90	46
Oldham	2009	Championship One	20	12	10	7	5	5	0	0	50	38
Barrow Raiders	2009	Championship	8	8	7	7	0	0	0	0	28	28
Barrow Raiders	2010	Championship	17	15	5	5	0	0	0	0	20	20
Barrow Raiders	2011	Championship	7	6	2	1	0	0	0	0	8	4
Widnes Vikings	2011	Championship	6	6	0	0	0	0	0	0	0	0
Hunslet Hawks	2013	Championship	10	10	1	1	2	2	0	0	8	8
Hunslet Hawks	2014	League 1	10	1	1	0	0	0	0	4	4	
