= Lucas Onyango =

Kenya international rugby union & league footballer & RL administrator

- Born: 12 May 1981 (age 45) Mombasa, Kenya
- Height: 1.79 m (5 ft 10 in)
- Weight: 81 kg (12 st 11 lb)

Rugby union career
- Position: Wing
Amateur team(s)
Years	Team	Apps	(Points)
2004-05	Manchester RFC		(27)
–	Mean Machine RFC	25	
Senior career
Years	Team	Apps	(Points)
–	Sale Sharks		
International career
Years	Team	Apps	(Points)
- Kenya
National sevens team
Years	Team		Comps
2002	Kenya 7s		
- Rugby league career

Playing information
- Position: Wing
Club
Years	Team	Pld	T	G	FG	P
2005	Widnes Vikings
2007–12	Oldham R.L.F.C.	108				292
	Oxford
	Total	108	0	0	0	292

Lucas Onyango (born May 12, 1981) is a Kenyan international development manager for the Kenya Rugby League. He used to play as a winger in rugby union for the Kenya national rugby union team and Sale Sharks, as well as Oldham RLFC and Widnes Vikings in rugby league.

== Playing career ==
In Kenya, he played for Mean Machine RFC, a Kenya Cup team affiliated to University of Nairobi. He played for Kenyan sevens team at the 2002 Commonwealth Games, after which he joined Manchester R.F.C. He moved to rugby league club Widnes Vikings in 2005.

== Post-playing career ==
In August 2020, Onyango was appointed as the international development manager for Kenya Rugby League. His appointment showcased the vision to grow the sport in Kenya and prepare for 2025 Rugby League World Cup qualifiers.

== Personal life ==
Lucas has a daughter Martha born in 2004, with his first wife Julie fitzpatrick. Lucas is now married to Zena Tikrity. They have two boys, his oldest son Ayad plays rugby and younger son Aymen plays for Manchester City Football Academy.

His sister Sharon Onyango has played for the Kenya women's national rugby union team.
