= Ian Watson (rugby league) =

Welsh rugby league coach and former player

Ian "Watto" Watson
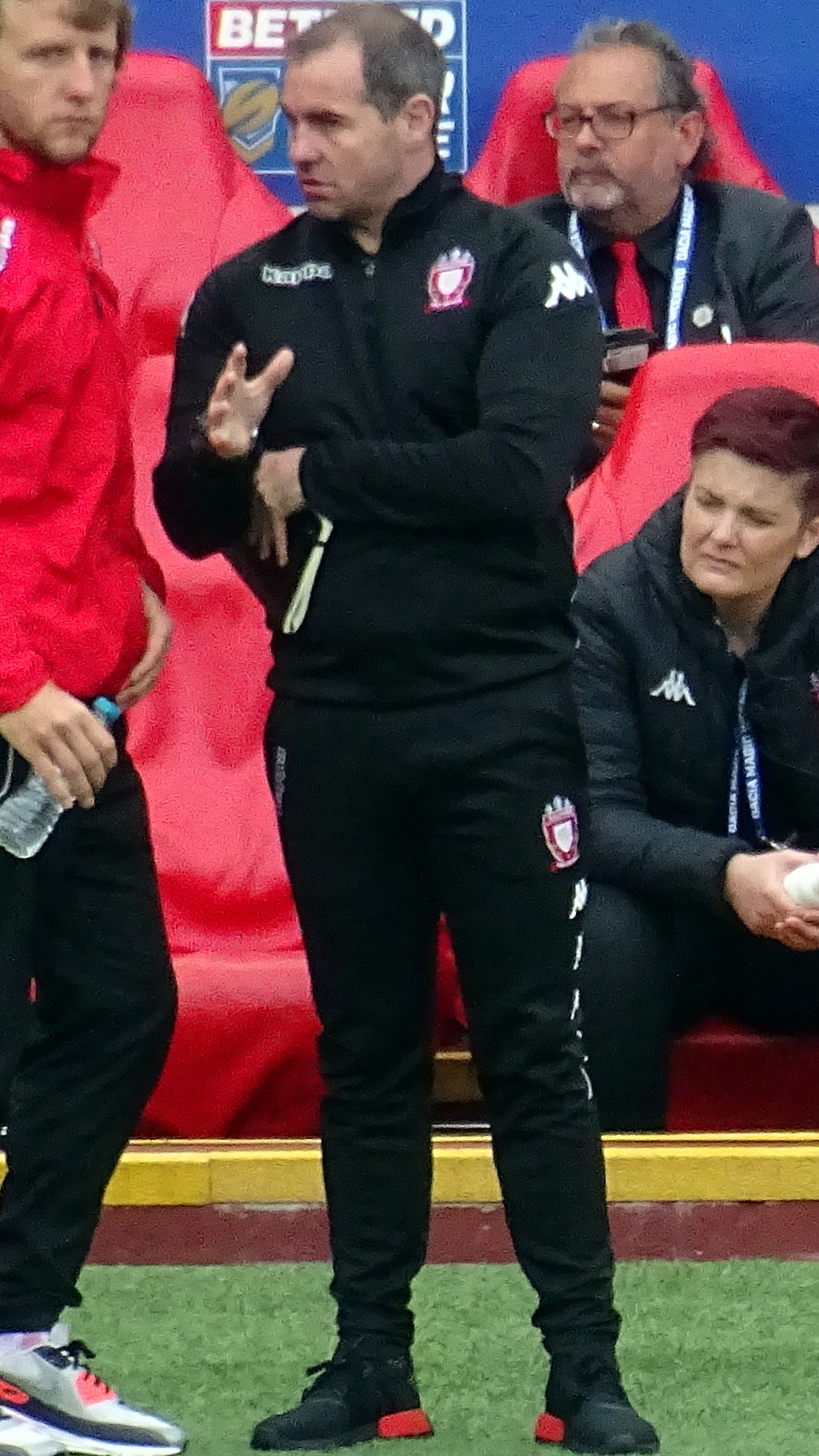

Personal information
- Full name: Ian Roger Watson
- Born: 27 October 1976 (age 50) Salford, Greater Manchester, England

Playing information
- Position: Scrum-half, Hooker
Club
Years	Team	Pld	T	G	FG	P
1994–97	Salford Reds	42	7	30	8	92
1996(loan)	→ Workington Town	5	1	15	0	34
1998–00	Swinton Lions	92	22	152	14	406
2001	Widnes Vikings	25	0	72	2	146
2002	Salford City Reds	23	2	0	1	9
2003	Rochdale Hornets	32	7	27	6	88
2004	Oldham	29	6	5	7	41
2005–06	Swinton Lions	36	7	8	0	44
2006	Widnes Vikings	16	0	1	0	2
2007	Halifax	30	3	9	1	31
2008–09	Leigh Centurions	52	13	62	4	180
2010–14	Swinton Lions	111	10	6	0	52
	Total	493	78	387	43	1125
Representative
Years	Team	Pld	T	G	FG	P
1995–11	Wales	30	7	1	0	30

Coaching information
Club
Years	Team	Gms	W	D	L	W%
2014	Swinton Lions	18	5	0	13	28
2015–20	Salford Red Devils	164	80	0	84	49
2021–24	Huddersfield Giants	90	43	1	36	48
	Total	272	128	1	133	47
- Source: As of 9 January 2023

Ian Watson (born 27 October 1976) is a professional rugby league coach who is an assistant coach at St Helens in the Super League, and a former Wales international who played as a scrum-half and hooker in the 1990s, 2000s and 2010s.

He played for the Salford City Reds, Workington Town, Swinton Lions, Widnes Vikings, Rochdale Hornets, Oldham, Halifax and the Leigh Centurions. Watson was a goal-kicker who holds the appearance record for Wales with 30 caps.

Watson has coached the Swinton Lions in the Championship and the Salford Red Devils and Huddersfield Giants in the Super League. He is considered one of the best British coaches in the game after taking unfancied Salford and Huddersfield to Finals.

== Background ==
Watson was born in Salford, Greater Manchester, England.

== Playing career ==
Watson started his professional career with the Salford Reds coming though from local amateur team Eccles RLFC.

In July 1996, he joined Workington Town on loan, where he played in the Super League for the first time.

He returned to the Salford Reds for the 1997's Super League II, making 27 appearances for the club.

Following the signings of Martin Crompton and Josh White, despite being a firm club favourite Watson was deemed surplus to requirements, and was sold to the Swinton Lions for a fee of £15,000. He spent three years with the Swinton Lions before signing a one-year contract with the Widnes Vikings for the 2001 season.

He returned to the Super League a year later, re-joining the Salford City Reds on a one-year deal.

Watson played out the remainder of his career in the Championships.

== Coaching career ==
=== Swinton Lions ===
In January 2014, Watson was appointed as player-coach for the Swinton Lions.

=== Salford Red Devils ===
He left Swinton Lions in July 2014 to join the Salford Red Devils as an assistant coach. In late 2015, Watson was promoted to interim head coach after Iestyn Harris left the club. He was given the job on a permanent basis for 2016, working alongside Director of Rugby Tim Sheens.

He coached the Salford Red Devils to the 2019 Super League Grand Final defeat by St Helens at Old Trafford.

On 17 October 2020, he coached Salford in the 2020 Challenge Cup Final defeat against Leeds Rhinos at Wembley Stadium.

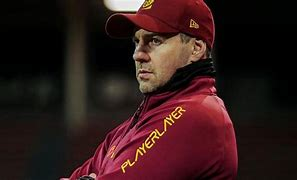
Ian Watson at the Huddersfield Giants

=== Huddersfield Giants ===
On 19 November 2020, Watson was confirmed as the new Huddersfield Giants coach on a three-year deal.

In round 5 of the 2021 Super League season, Watson earned his first win as Huddersfield coach when they defeated Leeds 14–13. In Watson's first year in charge, Huddersfield finished the 2021 Super League season in a disappointing 9th place on the table.

In May 2022, he repeated his earlier success with Salford when he steered Huddersfield Giants to the cup final, after defeating Hull Kingston Rovers at Elland Road. On 28 May 2022, Huddersfield were defeated 16–14 in the 2022 Challenge Cup Final by Wigan Warriors. Huddersfield finished the regular season in 3rd and entered the playoffs.

On 11 July 2024, it was reported that he had left Huddersfield Giants by mutual consent. Huddersfield started the season winning 7 from 10 and making the semi-final of the Challenge Cup against Warrington.

=== Seattle Seawolves ===
On 7 November 2024, it was reported that he had taken up the role of assistant coach at American Major League Rugby side Seattle Seawolves.

=== Hull KR ===
On 31 October 2025, it was reported that he had taken up the role of assistant coach at Hull KR.

=== St Helens ===
On 9 October 2026, it was reported that he had taken up the role of assistant coach at St Helens.

== Representative career ==
Watson held the record for having won the most caps for Wales, before being surpassed by Rhys Williams in 2022.

Having made his début against the USA in Philadelphia in 1995, he made 30 appearances for Wales, scoring 7 tries and kicking one goal.

He played at the 2000 Rugby League World Cup.

His final appearance for Wales came during the 2011 Four Nations tournament against New Zealand, and he announced his international retirement shortly after.
