= Paul Davidson (rugby league) =

England international rugby league footballer

Personal information
- Born: 1 August 1969 (age 56) Cumberland, England

Playing information
- Position: Centre, Prop, Second-row
Club
Years	Team	Pld	T	G	FG	P
1990–94	Widnes
1994–97	Oldham Bears	31+34	17		1	69
1998–99	St Helens	28+18	8			32
2000	London Broncos
2001–03	Halifax
2002	Rochdale Hornets
	Total	111	25	0	1	101
Representative
Years	Team	Pld	T	G	FG	P
1998	Emerging England	1	1	0	0	4
- Source: As of 18 May 2012

Paul Davidson (born 1 August 1969) is an English former rugby league footballer who played in the 1990s and 2000s. He played at representative level for England, and at club level for Hensingham ARLFC (in Hensingham, Whitehaven), Widnes, the Oldham Bears, St. Helens, the London Broncos, Halifax and the Rochdale Hornets, as a centre, prop, or second-row.

== International honours ==
Davidson won a cap while at St. Helens as a playing substitute for Emerging England in the 15–12 victory over Wales at Naughton Park, Widnes, on Friday 19 June 1998.
