= Ryan Clayton (rugby league) =

English rugby league footballer

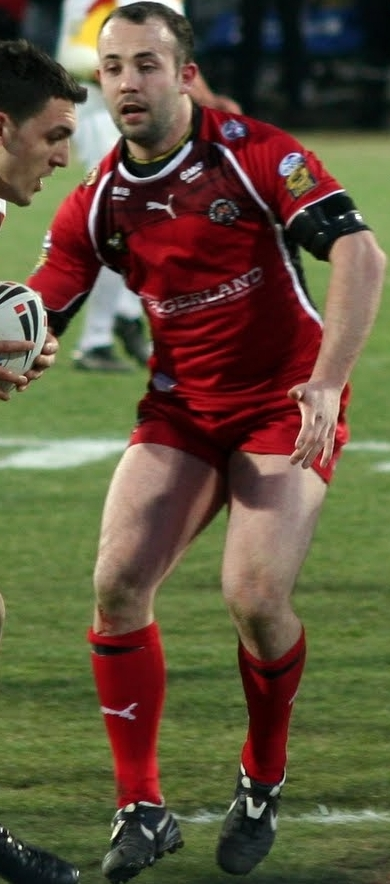

Personal information
- Full name: Ryan Clayton
- Born: 22 November 1982 (age 43) Oldham, Greater Manchester, England

Playing information
- Height: 6 ft 0 in (184 cm)
- Weight: 14 st 7 lb (92 kg)
- Position: Second-row
Club
Years	Team	Pld	T	G	FG	P
2000–03	Halifax	41	7	0	0	28
2004	Castleford Tigers	19	3	0	0	12
2004	Villefranche XIII Aveyron
2005	Huddersfield Giants	10	0	0	0	0
2006	Salford City Reds	13	2	0	0	8
2007–10	Castleford Tigers	75	11	0	0	44
2011	Halifax	18	1	0	0	4
	Total	176	24	0	0	96
Representative
Years	Team	Pld	T	G	FG	P
2003	England A	2	2	0	0	8

Ryan Clayton (born 22 November 1982), is an English former professional rugby league footballer who played in the 2000s and 2010s. He last played for Halifax in the Co-operative Championship.

He has previously played for the Salford City Reds, Huddersfield Giants, Halifax and Castleford. Due to injury, Ryan only played in 11-games for Castleford in 2008's Super League XIII. He was contracted at Castleford for 2009 and was looking to get back in the team for the new season.

Ryan's contract was not renewed at the end of the 2009 season, but Castleford re-signed him on 2 November 2009 for an additional year.

Ryan played for Castleford during 2010 but was released on 14 September 2010.

On 16 October 2010 Ryan joined re-joined former club Halifax.

Clayton now works for the Canberra Raiders as a Strength & Conditioning and Rehabilitation Coach.
