= Daryl Cardiss =

English rugby league footballer

Personal information
- Full name: Daryl Cardiss
- Born: 13 July 1978 (age 47); Leeds, England

Playing information
- Height: 5 ft 10 in (1.78 m)
- Position: Fullback
Club
Years	Team	Pld	T	G	FG	P
1995–98	Wigan Warriors	68	34	16	0	168
1999–03	Halifax	109	43	4	0	180
2003–04	Warrington Wolves	28	4	3	0	22
2006–07	Widnes Vikings	30	13	0	0	52
2008	Oldham	14	2	0	0	8
2009	Batley Bulldogs	15	5	0	0	20
	Total	264	101	23	0	450
Representative
Years	Team	Pld	T	G	FG	P
	Yorkshire

Daryl Cardiss (born 13 July 1978) is a British former professional rugby league footballer who played in the 1990s and 2000s. Cardiss played in the Super League for the Wigan Warriors, Halifax and the Warrington Wolves, as a fullback. He also went on to play for the Widnes Vikings, Oldham and the Batley Bulldogs.
