= Terry O'Connor (rugby league) =

Sports broadcaster and former Great Britain and Ireland rugby league footballer

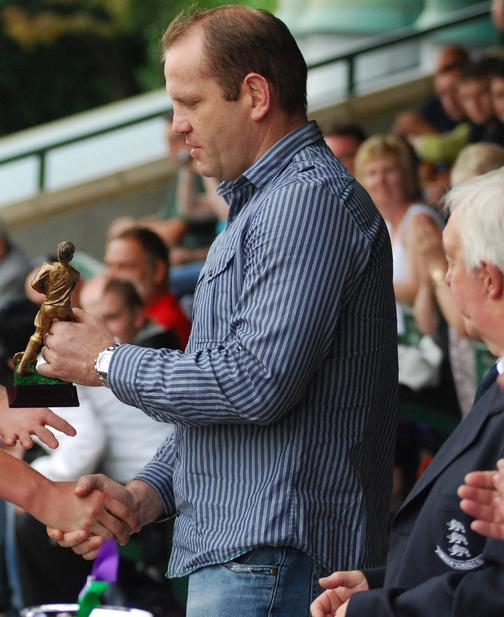

Personal information
- Full name: Terence Dennis Jason O'Connor
- Born: 13 October 1971 (age 54) Widnes, Lancashire, England

Playing information
- Height: 6 ft 2 in (188 cm)
- Weight: 18 st 2 lb (115 kg)
- Position: prop, Second-row
Club
Years	Team	Pld	T	G	FG	P
1991–94	Salford	29+10	3	0	0	12
1994–04	Wigan	306	13	0	0	52
2005–06	Widnes Vikings	53	6	0	0	24
	Total	398	22	0	0	88
Representative
Years	Team	Pld	T	G	FG	P
1996	Great Britain	14				14
1996–05	Ireland	11
2001–02	Lancashire	3
- Relatives: Jarrod O'Connor (son)

Terence "Tez" Dennis Jason O'Connor (born 13 October 1971) is a former professional rugby league footballer and commentator for Sky Sports. A Great Britain, England, Ireland international and Lancashire representative prop or second-row, he played his club rugby for English clubs Salford, Wigan and Widnes.

== Background ==
O'Connor was born in Widnes, Lancashire, England.

He was picked up from local Widnes side St Marie's after also playing for Widnes Tigers. He is a former BARLA international and toured New Zealand with them in 1991. Also on the tour was Darren Fleary, Paul Anderson and Barrie McDermott, all of whom went on to gain full international honours.

== Playing career ==
=== Salford ===
In 1990 Terry signed for Salford, and played for them for three years. He had the opportunity of signing for Wigan, St Helens, Warrington, Leeds and Bradford, but chose Salford as his childhood hero Steve O'Neill was part of the coaching team, along with Kevin Tamati. He was awarded Salford's young player of the year in 1991. He played in the Regal Trophy quarter-final against Wigan at the Willows, and was awarded the Man-of-the-Match. He joined Wigan in 1994 for a Salford record transfer fee of £95,000 and New Zealand International Sam Panapa. Salford also got a further £10,000 when Terry played for Great Britain.

=== Wigan ===
Whilst at Wigan he went on to win the Challenge Cup, Charity Shield, Regal Trophy, Premiership, Championship. Terry O'Connor played right-prop, in Wigan's 25–16 victory over St. Helens in the 1995–96 Regal Trophy Final during the 1994–95 season at Alfred McAlpine Stadium, Huddersfield on Saturday 13 January 1996. He made his début for Great Britain team in 1996 on the South Pacific tour. O'Connor played for Wigan at prop forward in their 1998 Super League Grand Final victory against Leeds. O'Connor played for the Wigan Warriors at prop forward in their 2000 Super League Grand Final loss against St. Helens.

In his time at Wigan, O'Connor played 317 first grade game and was voted into the Wigan and Super League team of the decade. He was a mainstay of the Wigan pack for a decade and enjoyed a testimonial in 2004 for his services to Wigan. Terry donated part of his testimonial money to under privileged children, which allowed them to go on holiday to Euro-Disney back in November 2004. In the history of Wigan RLFC, only 27 players have worn the Cherry and White top more than him.

Terry was also named in the SL dream team on 4 occasions in 1996, 2000, 2001, 2002 and was also named in the SL team of the decade between 1996 and 2006. O'Connor was also the 1st prop forward to be named on 4 occasions in the dream team.

=== Widnes ===
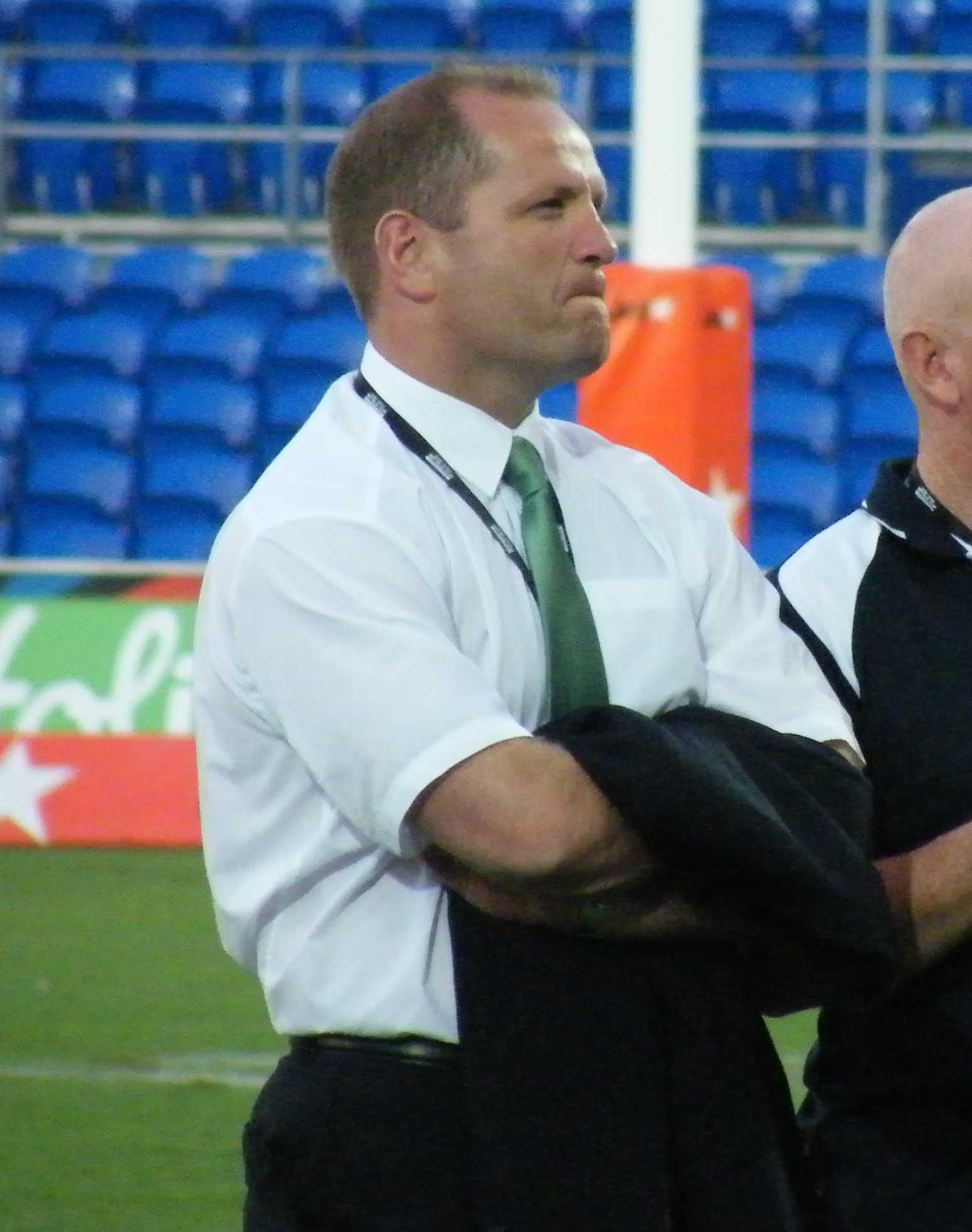
Terry O'Connor playing for Ireland at the 2008 Rugby League World Cup.

O'Connor joined his hometown club the Widnes Vikings at the end of the 2004's Super League IX. He captained the side in 2005 but with the introduction of Catalans Dragons to Super League in 2006 meant that the team who finished 11th were to be relegated, and it was the Widnes Vikings who finished in 11th position, ahead of the Leigh Centurions who finished in 12th position. Terry played on for one more year in the National League for the Widnes Vikings and got to play his last competitive game in the Grand Final only to be beaten by Hull Kingston Rovers. He was also joined in his last year by his good friend Barrie McDermott they both retired in 2006.

O'Connor went on to represent Ireland at the 2000 Rugby League World Cup, and went on to captain Ireland on numerous occasion. The side earned fabulous reviews under the guidance of Terry and his best friend Barrie McDermott. O'Connor also represented Lancashire in the Origin Series in 2001 and 2002 and never lost against arch rivals; Yorkshire. He was awarded the Roy Powell Medal for his performance in the 2001 series. O'Connor retired from Great Britain in 2002 with 15 caps.

On 25 March 2004 O'Connor was one of six footballers inducted into Rugby League Ireland's inaugural Hall of Fame at the Rugby League Heritage Centre in Huddersfield.

== Post-playing ==
After retiring from playing the game in 2006 O'Connor took on the role of Sporting Director at Widnes along with his role at Sky Sports, appearing in light-hearted features with Barrie McDermott as well as serving as a pundit for the coverage of lower-league games.

O'Connor is still heavily involved in charity work for former players and local under privileged children.

In 2017, O'Connor replaced the retiring Mike "Stevo" Stephenson on commentary for Super League on Sky Sports.
