= John Kirkpatrick (rugby league) =

English rugby league footballer

Personal information
- Full name: John Kirkpatrick
- Born: 3 January 1979 (age 46); Preston, Lancashire, England

Playing information
- Height: 6 ft 0 in (1.83 m)
- Weight: 14 st 9 lb (93 kg)

Rugby union
Club
| Years | Team | Pld | T | G | FG | P |
|---|---|---|---|---|---|---|
| 1995–99 | Preston Grasshoppers |

Rugby league
- Position: Fullback, Wing
Club
| Years | Team | Pld | T | G | FG | P |
|---|---|---|---|---|---|---|
| 2001–03 | St. Helens | 23 | 11 | 0 | 0 | 44 |
| 2003 | → Halifax (loan) | 4 | 1 | 0 | 0 | 4 |
| 2004–05 | London Broncos | 20 | 8 | 0 | 0 | 32 |
| 2006 | Widnes Vikings | 19 | 7 | 0 | 0 | 28 |
| | Total | 66 | 27 | 0 | 0 | 108 |

John Kirkpatrick (born 3 January 1979) is an English former rugby union and professional rugby league footballer who played in the 1990s and 2000s. He played club level rugby union (RU) for Preston Grasshoppers R.F.C., and club level rugby league (RL) in the Super League for St Helens, Halifax (loan), the London Broncos and in National League One for the Widnes Vikings, as a fullback or wing.

== Background ==
John Kirkpatrick was born in Preston, Lancashire, England, he has Scottish ancestors, and eligible to play for Scotland due to the grandparent rule.

== Playing career ==
Kirkpatrick joined St Helens from rugby union club Preston Grasshoppers in 1999. He initially played for the club on a part-time basis while studying for a university degree.

Kirkpatrick was called into the Scotland (RL) squad in 2006.
