= Aaron Summers (rugby league) =

Australian rugby league footballer (born 1981)

Personal information
- Full name: Aaron Summers
- Born: 2 August 1981 (age 45) Brisbane, Queensland, Australia

Playing information
- Height: 191 cm (6 ft 3 in)
- Weight: 103 kg (16 st 3 lb)
- Position: Prop
Club
Years	Team	Pld	T	G	FG	P
2005	Whitehaven RLFC	24	2	0	0	8
2006–07	Widnes Vikings	48	7	0	0	28
2008	Celtic Crusaders	25	2	0	0	8
	Total	97	11	0	0	44
Representative
Years	Team	Pld	T	G	FG	P
2007	Wales	1	0	0	0	0

Aaron Summers (born 2 August 1981), also known by the nickname of "Sum-Dog", is an Australian professional rugby league footballer for the Brisbane Broncos in the National Rugby League (NRL), and the Central Queensland Comets in the Queensland Cup. He plays as a prop. He is a Wales international. He has previously played for the Crusaders and Widnes Vikings.

Aaron Summers is an Australian-born (Gosford, New South Wales) rugby league player for the Brisbane Broncos in the NRL and the Central Queensland Comets in the Queensland Cup. He played the second half of the 2010 Queensland Cup Competition with the Sunshine Coast Sea Eagles.

He plays as a prop. He is a Wales international having Played against PNG at Brewery Field, Bridgend, Wales.[1]

He has previously played Jersey Flegg for the North Sydney Bears also Premier league for the South Sydney Rabbitohs. He played for Whitehaven RLFC, Celtic Crusaders[1] and Widnes Vikings in the English competition.[2]
