= 2012 Widnes Vikings season =

- Super League XVII Rank: 14th
- Play-off result: N/A
- Challenge Cup: 4th Round
- 2012 record: Wins: 6; draws: 0; losses: 21
- Points scored: For: 566; against: 1054

Team information
- Chairman: Steve O'Connor
- Head coach: Denis Betts
- Captain: Jon Clarke
- Stadium: Stobart Stadium Halton
- Avg. attendance: 5,977 ▲
- Agg. attendance: 77,700 ▲
- High attendance: 8,120 vs. Wakefield Trinity Wildcats

Top scorers
- Tries: Patrick Ah Van – 16
- Goals: Patrick Ah Van – 34
- Points: Patrick Ah Van – 132
← 2011	List of seasons	2013 →

This article details the Widnes Vikings rugby league football club's 2012 season. This is the seventeenth season of the Super League era.

== Season review ==
March 2011

The Rugby Football League announced that the Vikings' application had been accepted and would be accepted into Super League XVII.

April 2011

Widnes give Prop Ben Kavanagh a 3-year Super League deal making him the first current player to get a new Super League contract.

June 2011

It was announced that the Vikings would keep current players Paddy Flynn and Steve Pickersgill through the 2012 season on their existing deals.

July 2011

Widnes announced the capture of Wigan Warriors Prop Ben Cross (formerly of Leeds Rhinos) on a one-year deal; they also recruited Second Rower Hep Cahill form Crusaders on a three-year deal. Another signing for the Vikings came in the form of off of contract Hull Kingston Rovers fullback Shaun Briscoe, also current player Macgraff Leuluai signed a two-year Super League deal after impressing the coaching staff in 2011. Three more current Widnes players signed Super League contracts: David Allen on a two-year deal, Thomas Coyle on a two-year deal and Kurt Haggerty on a one-year deal with the option of another year.

August 2011

The Vikings signed New Zealand winger Patrick Ah Van from the Bradford Bulls on a two-year deal. Other new signings include Frank Winterstein on a 2-year deal from Crusaders, also his teammate Lloyd White joins Widnes on a 3-year deal. Wakefield Trinity Wildcats centre Chris Dean was announced on a 2-year deal while Wigan Warriors prop Ben Davies also signs for 2 years. Widnes have also promoted youngsters Jack Owens, Danny Craven and Tom Gilmore to full-time contracts with the Vikings.

September 2011

Widnes announce the signing of Castleford Tigers centre Willie Isa on a 2 Year Deal. The Vikings released Dean Gaskell, Richard Varkulis, Gareth Haggerty, Danny Hulme, Shane Grady, Chris Lunt, Chaz I'Anson, Matt Gardner, Greg Scott, Daniel Heckenberg, Danny Sculthorpe, Tangi Ropati and Dave Houghton.

October 2011

There was no news for October.

November 2011

The 2012 Super League fixtures were announced with Widnes taking on Wakefield Trinity Wildcats at the Stobart Stadium on 3 February; this match was selected to be on Sky Sports. It marked the Vikings' first Super League game since 2005. Widnes signed centre Stefan Marsh on a one-year loan deal from fellow Super League club Wigan Warriors.

December 2011

The 2012 squad numbers were released. The Vikings lost their Boxing Day friendly 32–18 against arch rivals Warrington Wolves, the Vikings tries came from Scott Moore, Thomas Coyle and Danny Craven, Patrick Ah Van kicked all 3 goals.

January 2012

Widnes started 2012 with a 28–6 win over Championship team Swinton Lions. Paddy Flynn, Stefan Marsh, Kurt Haggerty, Rhys Hanbury and Danny Craven all scored a try each for the Vikings whilst Patrick Ah Van kicked a goal, Craven kicked a goal and Lloyd White finished with 2 goals. The Vikings signed ex-Wigan Warriors fullback Cameron Phelps on a 2 Year Deal. Widnes had the honour of being St Helens R.F.C.'s first opponents at Langtree Park, however they went down 42–24 after a spirited performance, wingman Paddy Flynn scored a hat-trick while Stefan Marsh and Rhys Hanbury also crossed the try-line, Ah Van converted 2 of the tries. It was announced that the Vikings had captured Melbourne Storm prop Sione Kite on a two-year deal.

February 2012

Widnes kicked off their first year back in the Super League with a 32–14 loss to new-look Wakefield Trinity Wildcats, the Vikings looked good and took the lead with tries from Danny Craven, Patrick Ah Van and Hep Cahill with Ah Van kicking a goal however they surrendered to a late Wakefield fightback. The Vikings were destroyed by a rampant Huddersfield Giants side, the Giants came away with a 66–6 win with Widnes' sole try coming from Paddy Flynn while Ah Van kicked the goal. Widnes lost 38–18 to Salford City Reds with Ah Van scoring 2 tries and 2 goals with Flynn also scoring. Rhys Hanbury also kicked a goal. The Vikings were beaten 44–16 by the champions Leeds Rhinos, Ah Van, Hanbury and Flynn all crossed for tries whilst Ah Van kicked 2 goals.

March 2012

March did not start well for the Vikings as they lost 36–0 to Hull Kingston Rovers. However the week after the Vikings recorded their first win of the season and what a shock it was, trailing 36–18 with 30 minutes to go Widnes came back and beat Wigan Warriors 37–36 with Paddy Flynn, Stefan Marsh, Shaun Briscoe (2), Lloyd White and Frank Winterstein all scoring tries, on loan Gareth O'Brien kicked all 6 goals and White finished the scoring with a drop-goal. This victory was short lived after Hull F.C. dominated the Vikings the very next week, the game finished 58–10 in Hull's favour and Widnes got over through Fylnn twice, O'Brien added a goal. The Vikings recorded their 2nd win of the season by beating London Broncos 38–30 with White scoring 2 tries, Chris Dean, Rhys Hanbury, Ben Davies and Cameron Phelps all scoring and O'Brien added 7 goals. Widnes were losers in France when Catalans Dragons beat them 76–6 with Sione Kite scoring for the Vikings and O'Brien converting.

April 2012

Widnes started the Easter period with a 46–12 loss to local rivals Warrington Wolves, Chris Dean and David Allen both crossed for the Vikings with Patrick Ah Van converting both. The Vikings were outplayed by the Bradford Bulls and lost 38–4 with Rhys Hanbury crossing for their sole try. Widnes bowed out of the Challenge Cup but not before giving St Helens R.F.C. a massive scare by coming from 40–16 to just lose 40–38. Ah Van scored 2 tries and Lloyd White also crossed for 2, Kurt Haggerty, Hanbury and Hep Cahill also scored for the Vikings. Ah Van kicked 5 goals from 7 attempts. Wigan Warriors youngster Joe Mellor joined the Vikings on a months loan whilst hooker Scott Moore is sacked by Widnes and was snapped up by Huddersfield Giants. Widnes lost to St Helens R.F.C. for the 2nd time in 2 weeks but this time didn't get anywhere close to the Saints as they lost 62–0.

May 2012

Widnes kicked off May with the announcement that Anthony Watts signed a 1-year extension keeping him at the Vikings until the end of 2013 also prop/second rower Anthony Mullally rejects a contract extension. Meanwhile, Paddy Flynn signs a 2-year extension with the Vikings keeping him at the Stobart Stadium until the end of 2014. Widnes lost yet another game, this time they lost 36–12 to fellow strugglers Castleford Tigers, Flynn and Stefan Marsh both scored tries and Rhys Hanbury kicked 2 goals. Widnes lost a close game 42–34 to Catalans Dragons, Marsh, Joe Mellor, Hanbury, Chris Dean, David Allen and Patrick Ah Van all scored tries whilst Hanbury kicked 5 goals. Widnes announce that Huddersfield Giants captain Kevin Brown will be playing for them in 2013. Leeds Rhinos hooker Paul McShane signs with the Vikings on a months loan.

June 2012

Widnes recorded their 3rd win of the season with a 26–22 win over the Huddersfield Giants, Patrick Ah Van, Rhys Hanbury, Ben Cross and Cameron Phelps all scored tries whilst Ah Van kicked 5 goals. Widnes lost to fellow basement battlers London Broncos 28–24 with Phelps scoring 2 tries and Frank Winterstein also scoring 2 and Ah Van kicked all 4 goals. Widnes suffered a 54–12 loss at the hands of Wigan Warriors, Cross scored his 2nd career try and Joe Mellor also scored against his parent club, Ah Van kicked both goals.

July 2012

Widnes announce the immediate signing of Hull F.C. prop Eamon O'Carroll on a 2 1/2-year deal. The Vikings had their best victory of the season when they beat Castleford Tigers 40–10. Stefan Marsh, Frank Winterstein, Ben Davies, Paul McShane, Joe Mellor, Eamon O'Carroll and Patrick Ah Van all scored a try each whilst Ah Van kicked 5 goals and Rhys Hanbury also kicked a goal. Widnes pushed St. Helens very close but due to a last minute try the Vikings lost 24–23. Ah Van scored a hat-trick whilst Chris Dean and Cameron Phelps also crossed. Hanbury kicked 1 goal and slotted a drop goal. Widnes recorded their 5th win of the season against Salford City Reds winning 46–8, Phelps, Ah Van and Hanbury all scored 2 tries each whilst McShane and Danny Craven scored a try. Hanbury kicked 7 goals. Widnes wrapped up July with a 32–26 loss to Hull Kingston Rovers, tries came from Joe Mellor, Stefan Marsh, Kurt Haggerty, Danny Craven and Rhys Hanbury. Hanbury also kicked 3 goals.

August 2012

August started off with a 38–26 loss to Bradford Bulls, former Bull Patrick Ah Van scored 2 tries and kicked a goal, Rhys Hanbury also scored a try and kicked 2 goals whilst Ben Davies and Danny Craven also scored. Widnes were on the wrong end of a bad scoreline losing 68–24 to champions Leeds Rhinos. Stefan Marsh scored 2 tries, Frank Winterstein and Cameron Phelps also scored whilst Ah Van kicked 4 goals. Widnes recorded their 6th win of the season with an outstanding 42–16 over Hull FC. Shaun Briscoe and Willie Isa both scored 2 tries whilst Paddy Flynn, Winterstein, Craven and Hanbury all scored a try each. Craven kicked 2 goals and Paul McShane added a further 3 to seal the victory.

September 2012

Widnes started September with a 22–18 loss to Wakefield Trinity Wildcats. Rhys Hanbury scored twice and Paddy Flynn also crossed the line. Hanbury kicked 2 goals whilst Paul McShane also added a goal. Widnes finished bottom after a 52–14 loss to Warrington Wolves, Frank Winterstein, Paul McShane and Rhys Hanbury all scored tries and Hanbury added a goal.

== Squad ==
2012 Widnes Vikings Squad
First Team Squad			Coaching staff
1 Shaun Briscoe – FB; 2 Paddy Flynn – WG; 3 Chris Dean – CE; 4 Willie Isa – CE; 5 Patrick Ah Van – WG; 6 Lloyd White – SO; 7 Rhys Hanbury – SH; 8 Ben Cross – PR; 9 Scott Moore (c) – HK; 10 Ben Davies – PR; 11 Frank Winterstein – SR; 12 Hep Cahill – SR; 13 Jon Clarke – LF	14 Anthony Watts – SH; 15 Simon Finnigan – LF; 16 Ben Kavanagh – PR; 17 Steve Pickersgill – PR; 18 Cameron Phelps – CE; 19 Sione Kite – PR; 20 Stefan Marsh – CE; 21 David Allen – SR; 22 Macgraff Leuluai – PR; 23 Thomas Coyle – positions; 24 Kurt Haggerty – PR; 25 Danny Craven – FB; 26 Anthony Mullally – PR	27 Grant Gore – SO; 28 Alex Gerrard – PR; 29 Jack Owens – FB; 30 Tom Gilmore – SH; 31 Alex Brown – WG	Head coach: Denis Betts; Assistant coach: Mick Cassidy; Legend: (c) Captain(s); (vc) Vice-captain(s)

=== Transfers ===
==== In ====
Name	Position	Signed from	Date	Contract Length
Ben Cross	Prop	Wigan Warriors	July 2011	1 Year
Hep Cahill	Second row	Crusaders RL	July 2011	3 Years
Shaun Briscoe	Fullback	Hull Kingston Rovers	July 2011	2 Years
Patrick Ah Van	Winger	Bradford Bulls	August 2011	2 Years
Ben Davies	Prop	Wigan Warriors	August 2011	2 Years
Lloyd White	Stand off	Crusaders RL	August 2011	3 Years
Rhys Hanbury	Half-back	Crusaders RL	August 2011	3 Years
Chris Dean	Centre	Wakefield Trinity Wildcats	August 2011	2 Years
Frank Winterstein	Second row	Crusaders RL	August 2011	2 Years
Willie Isa	Centre	Castleford Tigers	September 2011	2 Years
Scott Moore	Hooker	St Helens R.F.C.	October 2011	3 Years
Cameron Phelps	Fullback	Free agent	January 2012	2 Years
Sione Kite	Prop forward	Melbourne Storm	January 2012	2 Years

==== Out ====
Name	Position	Signed from	Date	Contract Length
Dean Gaskell	Wing	Released	September 2011	
Richard Varkulis	Centre	Released	September 2011	
Gareth Haggerty	Prop	Released	September 2011	
Danny Hulme	Fullback	Released	September 2011	
Shane Grady	Centre	Released	September 2011	
Chris Lunt	Hooker	Released	September 2011	
Chaz I'Anson	Stand off	Released	September 2011	
Matt Gardner	Wing	Released	September 2011	
Greg Scott	Wing	Released	September 2011	
Daniel Heckenberg	Prop	Released	September 2011	
Danny Sculthorpe	Prop	Released	September 2011	
Tangi Ropati	Fullback	Released	September 2011	
Dave Houghton	Wing	Released	September 2011	

== Preseason ==
=== Friendlies ===
LEGEND
Win
Draw
Loss

Vikings score is first.

Date	Competition	Vrs	H/A	Venue	Result	Score	Tries	Goals	Att	Report
26 December 2011	Pre Season	Wolves	A	Halliwell Jones Stadium	L	18–32	Moore, Coyle, Mullally	Ah Van 3/3	5,567	Report
8 January 2012	Pre Season	Lions	A	Leigh Sports Village	W	28–6	Marsh, Flynn, Craven, Hanbury, Haggerty	Ah Van 1/2, Craven 1/1, White 2/2	1,488	Report
20 January 2012	Pre Season	Saints	A	Langtree Park	L	24–42	Flynn (3), Marsh, Hanbury	Ah Van 2/5	11,924	Report

=== Appearances ===
- Pre season friendlies

FB	CE	WI	SO	SH	PR	HK	SR	LF	IN	Yellow card

No	Player	1	2	3
1	Shaun Briscoe	x	FB	FB
2	Paddy Flynn	W	W	W
3	Chris Dean	x	x	B
4	Willie Isa	C	C	C
5	Patrick Ah Van	W	W	W
6	Lloyd White	SH	B	B
7	Rhys Hanbury	x	SH	SH
8	Ben Cross	x	x	P
9	Scott Moore	B	H	H
10	Ben Davies	P	B	P
11	Frank Winterstein	SR	SR	SR
12	Hep Cahill	B	SR	x
13	Jon Clarke	x	L	L
14	Anthony Watts	SO	B	SO
15	Simon Finnigan	x	B	x
16	Ben Kavanagh	P	B	B
17	Steve Pickersgill	x	P	B
18	Name	x	x	x
19	Name	x	x	x
20	Stefan Marsh	C	C	C
21	David Allen	x	B	SR
22	Macgraff Leuluai	SR	B	B
23	Thomas Coyle	H	B	x
24	Kurt Haggerty	L	x	B
25	Danny Craven	FB	SO	B
26	Anthony Mullally	B	P	B
27	Grant Gore	x	x	x
28	Alex Gerrard	B	B	x
29	Jack Owens	B	B	x
30	Tom Gilmore	x	x	x
31	Alex Brown	x	x	x
32	Name	x	x	x

== Season ==
=== Stobart Super League ===
==== Table ====
Super League XVII
Pos	Team	Pld	W	D	L	PF	PA	PD	Pts	Qualification
1	Wigan Warriors (L)	27	21	0	6	994	449	+545	42	Play-offs
2	Warrington Wolves	27	20	1	6	909	539	+370	41	Play-offs
3	St Helens	27	17	2	8	795	480	+315	36	Play-offs
4	Catalans Dragons	27	18	0	9	812	611	+201	36	Play-offs
5	Leeds Rhinos (C)	27	16	0	11	823	662	+161	32	Play-offs
6	Hull F.C.	27	15	2	10	696	621	+75	32	Play-offs
7	Huddersfield Giants	27	14	0	13	699	664	+35	28	Play-offs
8	Wakefield Trinity Wildcats	27	13	0	14	633	764	−131	26	Play-offs
9	Bradford Bulls	27	14	1	12	633	756	−123	23 (Note: Bradford Bulls deducted 6 points on 25 July 2012 for entering administration)	
10	Hull Kingston Rovers	27	10	1	16	753	729	+24	21	
11	Salford City Reds	27	8	1	18	618	844	−226	17	
12	London Broncos	27	7	0	20	588	890	−302	14	
13	Castleford Tigers	27	6	0	21	554	948	−394	12	
14	Widnes Vikings	27	6	0	21	532	1082	−550	12	

Source: superleague.co.uk and BBC Sport.
Rules for classification: 1st on competition points; 2nd on match points difference.
Competition points: for win = 2; for draw = 1; for loss = 0.
(C) Champions; (L) League Leaders' Shield Winners

===== Fixtures and results =====
LEGEND
Win
Draw
Loss

Date	Competition	Rnd	Vrs	H/A	Venue	Result	Score	Tries	Goals	Att	Live on TV	Report	Lineup	Subs	
3 February 2012	Super League XVII	1	Wakefield Trinity Wildcats	H	Halton Stadium	L	14–32	Craven, Ah Van, Cahill	Ah Van 1/3	8,120	Sky Sports	Report	25. Craven, 3. Dean, 20. Marsh, 4. Isa, 5. Ah Van, 13. Clarke, 7. Hanbury, 8. Cross, 9. Moore, 16. Kavanagh, 11. Winterstein, 21. Allen, 12. Cahill	6. White, 17. Pickersgill, 24. Haggerty, 26. Mullally	-
12 February 2012	Super League XVII	2	Giants	A	Galpharm Stadium	L	6–66	Flynn	Ah Van 1/1	8,869	–	Report	25. Craven, 2. Flynn, 3. Dean, 4. Isa, 5. Ah Van, 6. White, 7. Hanbury, 8. Cross, 9. Moore, 10. Davies, 11. Winterstein, 21. Allen, 12. Cahill	15. Finnigan, 16. Kavanagh, 24. Haggerty, 26. Mullally	-
19 February 2012	Super League XVII	3	Salford City Reds	H	Halton Stadium	L	18–38	Ah Van (2), Flynn	Ah Van 2/2, Hanbury 1/1	5,053	–	Report	25. Craven, 2. Flynn, 20. Marsh, 4. Isa, 5. Ah Van, 6. White, 7. Hanbury, 8. Cross, 13. Clarke, 10. Davies, 11. Winterstein, 21. Allen, 24. Haggerty	14. Watts, 16. Kavanagh, 22. Leuluai, 26. Mullally	-
26 February 2012	Super League XVII	4	Rhinos	H	Halton Stadium	L	16–44	Ah Van, Hanbury, Flynn	Ah Van 2/3	6,046	–	Report	1. Briscoe, 2. Flynn, 20. Marsh, 4. Isa, 5. Ah Van, 6. White, 7. Hanbury, 8. Cross, 13. Clarke, 10. Davies, 11. Winterstein, 21. Allen, 12. Cahill	15. Finnigan, 17. Pickersgill, 25. Craven, 26. Mullally	-
4 March 2012	Super League XVII	5	Hull Kingston Rovers	A	Craven Park	L	0–36	–	–	7,423	–	Report	1. Briscoe, 2. Flynn, 20. Marsh, 4. Isa, 5. Ah Van, 6. White, 7. Hanbury, 8. Cross, 13. Clarke, 10. Davies, 11. Winterstein, 21. Allen, 12. Cahill	15. Finnigan, 17. Pickersgill, 25. Craven, 26. Mullally	-
11 March 2012	Super League XVII	6	Warriors	H	Halton Stadium	W	37–36	Flynn, Marsh, Briscoe (2), White, Winterstein	O'Brien 6/6, White 1 DG	7,357	–	Report	1. Briscoe, 2. Flynn, 20. Marsh, 19. Phelps, 4. Isa, 32. O'Brien, 25. Craven, 17. Pickersgill, 13. Clarke, 10. Davies, 11. Winterstein, 21. Allen, 12. Cahill	6. White, 15. Finnigan, 18. Kite, 26. Mullally	-
18 March 2012	Super League XVII	7	Hull F.C.	A	KC Stadium	L	10–58	Flynn (2)	O'Brien 1/2	10,705	–	Report	1. Briscoe, 2. Flynn, 20. Marsh, 19. Phelps, 4. Isa, 25. Craven, 32. O'Brien, 17. Pickersgill, 13. Clarke, 10. Davies, 11. Winterstein, 21. Allen, 12. Cahill	6. White, 15. Finnigan, 18. Kite, 26. Mullally	-
25 March 2012	Super League XVII	8	Broncos	H	Halton Stadium	W	38–30	White (2), Dean, Hanbury, Davies, Phelps	O'Brien 7/7	5,635		Report	19. Phelps, 2. Flynn, 20. Marsh, 3. Dean, 4. Isa, 32. O'Brien, 7. Hanbury, 8. Cross, 6. White, 18. Kite, 11. Winterstein, 15. Finnigan, 12. Cahill	9. Moore, 10. Davies, 21. Allen, 17. Pickersgill	-
31 March 2012	Super League XVII	9	Dragons	A	Stade Gilbert Brutus	L	6–76	Kite	O'Brien 1/1	9,156	–	Report	1. Briscoe, 2. Flynn, 19. Phelps, 3. Dean, 4. Isa, 32. O'Brien, 7. Hanbury, 8. Cross, 6. White, 18. Kite, 11. Winterstein, 21. Allen, 15. Finnigan	9. Moore, 10. Davies, 17. Pickersgill, 22. Leuluai	-
5 April 2012	Super League XVII	10	Wolves	A	Halliwell Jones Stadium	L	12–46	Dean, Allen	Ah Van 2/2	12,042	Sky Sports	Report	19. Phelps, 2. Flynn, 3. Dean, 4. Isa, 5. Ah Van, 25.Craven, 7. Hanbury, 18. Kite, 9. Moore, 12. Cahill, 21. Allen, 15. Finnigan, 22. Leuluai	6. White, 8. Cross, 24. Haggerty, 28. Gerrard	-
9 April 2012	Super League XVII	11	Bulls	H	Halton Stadium	L	4–38	Hanbury	Ah Van 0/1	5,687	–	Report	29. Owens, 2. Flynn, 3. Dean, 4. Isa, 5. Ah Van, 25. Craven, 7. Hanbury, 8. Cross, 13. Clarke, 18. Kite, 11. Winterstein, 15. Finnigan, 12. Cahill	6. White, 9. Moore, 10. Davies, 21. Allen	-
20 April 2012	Super League XVII	12	Saints	A	Langtree Park	L	0–62	–	–	14,253	–	Report	19. Phelps, 2. Flynn, 20. Marsh, 4. Isa, 5. Ah Van, 25. Craven, 34. Mellor, 8. Cross, 13. Clarke, 17. Pickersgill, 24. Haggerty, 11. Winterstein, 12. Cahill	9. White, 21. Allen, 22. Leuluai, 26. Mullally	-
7 May 2012	Super League XVII	13	Tigers	A	The Jungle	L	12–36	Flynn, Marsh	Hanbury 2/3	5,580	Sky Sports	Report	19. Phelps, 2. Flynn, 20. Marsh, 3. Dean, 4. Isa, 7. Hanbury, 34. Mellor, 8. Cross, 13. Clarke, 12. Cahill, 11. Winterstein, 21. Allen, 15. Finnigan	6. White, 10. Davies, 17. Pickersgill, 22. Leuluai	-
20 May 2012	Super League XVII	14	Dragons	H	Halton Stadium	L	34–42	Marsh, Mellor, Hanbury, Dean, Allen, Ah Van	Hanbury 5/6	4,684	–	Report	19. Phelps, 2. Flynn, 20. Marsh, 3. Dean, 5. Ah Van, 34. Mellor, 7. Hanbury, 8. Cross, 13. Clarke, 17. Pickersgill, 11. Winterstein, 21. Allen, 12. Cahill	6. White, 10. Davies, 24. Haggerty, 26. Mullally	-
27 May 2012	Super League XVII	15	Wolves	N	Etihad Stadium	L	4–68	Haggerty	Hanbury 0/1	30,763	Sky Sports	Report	19. Phelps, 2. Flynn, 20. Marsh, 3. Dean, 5. Ah Van, 34. Mellor, 7. Hanbury, 8. Cross, 13. Clarke, 17. Pickersgill, 11. Winterstein, 24. Haggerty, 12. Cahill	4. Isa, 10. Davies, 22. Leuluai, 28. Gerrard	-
3 June 2012	Super League XVII	16	Giants	H	Halton Stadium	W	26–22	Ah Van, Hanbury, Cross, Phelps	Ah Van 5/6	4,644	–	Report	19. Phelps, 2. Flynn, 20. Marsh, 3. Dean, 5. Ah Van, 34. Mellor, 7. Hanbury, 8. Cross, 35. McShane, 12. Cahill, 11. Winterstein, 24. Haggerty, 21. Allen	4. Isa, 10. Davies, 22. Leuluai, 17. Pickersgill	-
9 June 2012	Super League XVII	17	Broncos	A	Twickenham Stoop	L	24–28	Phelps (2), Winterstein (2)	Ah Van 4/4	2,117	–	Report	19. Phelps, 2. Flynn, 4. Isa, 3. Dean, 5. Ah Van, 13. Clarke, 7. Hanbury, 8. Cross, 35. McShane, 17. Pickersgill, 11. Winterstein, 21. Allen, 12. Cahill	10. Davies, 22. Leuluai, 24. Haggerty, 30. Gilmore	-
25 June 2012	Super League XVII	18	Warriors	A	DW Stadium	L	12–54	Cross, Mellor	Ah Van 2/2	13,445	–	Report	19. Phelps, 2. Flynn, 3. Dean, 4. Isa, 5. Ah Van, 7. Hanbury, 34. Mellor, 8. Cross, 35. McShane, 17. Pickersgill, 11. Winterstein, 21. Allen, 12. Cahill	1. Briscoe, 10. Davies, 25. Craven, 28. Gerrard	-
2 July 2012	Super League XVII	19	Tigers	H	Halton Stadium	W	40–10	Marsh, Winterstein, Davies, McShane, Mellor, O'Carroll, Ah Van	Ah Van 5/6, Hanbury 1/1	4,501	Sky Sports	Report	19. Phelps, 4. Isa, 20. Marsh, 3. Dean, 5. Ah Van, 7. Hanbury, 34. Mellor, 8. Cross, 13. Clarke, 17. Pickersgill, 11. Winterstein, 21. Allen, 12. Cahill	36. O'Carroll, 35. McShane, 10. Davies, 18. Kite	-
8 July 2012	Super League XVII	20	Saints	H	Halton Stadium	L	23–24	Ah Van (3), Dean, Phelps	Hanbury 1/4, Marsh 0/1, Hanbury – 1 DG	7,023	–	Report	19. Phelps, 4. Isa, 20. Marsh, 3. Dean, 5. Ah Van, 34. Mellor, 7. Hanbury, 8. Cross, 13. Clarke, 17. Pickersgill, 11. Winterstein, 21. Allen, 12. Cahill	10. Davies, 18. Kite, 35. McShane, 36. O'Carroll	-
20 July 2012	Super League XVII	21	Salford City Reds	A	City of Salford Stadium	W	46–8	Phelps (2), Hanbury (2), Ah Van (2), McShane, Craven	Hanbury 7/8	5,196	–	Report	19. Phelps, 4. Isa, 3. Dean, 20. Marsh, 5. Ah Van, 34. Mellor, 7. Hanbury, 8. Cross, 35. McShane, 17. Pickersgill, 11. Winterstein, 21. Allen, 12. Cahill	10. Davies, 18. Kite, 25. Craven, 36. O'Carroll	-
29 July 2012	Super League XVII	22	Hull Kingston Rovers	H	Halton Stadium	L	26–32	Mellor, Marsh, Haggerty, Craven, Hanbury	Hanbury 3/5	5,325	–	Report	29. Owens, 4. Isa, 20. Marsh, 3. Dean, 5. Ah Van, 34. Mellor, 7. Hanbury, 8. Cross, 35. McShane, 17. Pickersgill, 11. Winterstein, 21. Allen, 12. Cahill	10. Davies, 18. Kite, 24. Haggerty, 25. Craven	-
5 August 2012	Super League XVII	23	Bulls	A	Odsal Stadium	L	26–38	Ah Van (2), Davies, Craven, Hanbury	Hanbury 2/4, Ah Van 1/1	10,261	–	Report	19. Phelps, 4. Isa, 20. Marsh, 3. Dean, 5. Ah Van, 25. Craven, 7. Hanbury, 10. Davies, 35. McShane, 17. Pickersgill, 11. Winterstein, 21. Allen, 12. Cahill	13. Clarke, 18. Kite, 24. Haggerty, 28. Gerrard	-
10 August 2012	Super League XVII	24	Rhinos	A	Headingley Stadium	L	24–68	Marsh (2), Winterstein, Phelps	Ah Van 4/4	13,326	–	Report	19. Phelps, 4. Isa, 20. Marsh, 3. Dean, 5. Ah Van, 25. Craven, 7. Hanbury, 17. Pickersgill, 24. Haggerty, 10. Davies, 11. Winterstein, 21. Allen, 12. Cahill	28. Gerrard, 22. Leuluai, 27. Gore, 18. Kite	-
18 August 2012	Super League XVII	25	Hull F.C.	H	Halton Stadium	W	42–16	Isa (2), Flynn, Briscoe (2), Winterstein, Craven, Hanbury	Hanbury 0/2, Craven 2/3, McShane 3/3	5,008	Sky Sports	Report	1. Briscoe, 2. Flynn, 20. Marsh, 19. Phelps, 4. Isa, 25. Craven, 7. Hanbury, 10. Davies, 13. Clarke, 18. Kite, 11. Winterstein, 21. Allen, 12. Cahill	16. Kavanagh, 24. Haggerty, 28. Gerrard, 35. McShane	-
2 September 2012	Super League XVII	26	Wakefield Trinity Wildcats	A	Belle Vue	L	18–22	Hanbury (2), Flynn	Hanbury 2/2, McShane 1/2	8,234	Sky Sports	Report	1. Briscoe, 2. Flynn, 20. Marsh, 19. Phelps, 4. Isa, 25. Craven, 7. Hanbury, 17. Pickersgill, 13. Clarke, 18. Kite, 11. Winterstein, 21/ Allen, 12. Cahill	18. Kavanagh, 10. Davies, 28. Gerrard, 35. McShane	-
9 September 2012	Super League XVII	27	Wolves	H	Halton Stadium	L	14–52	Winterstein, McShane, Hanbury	Hanbury 1/1	8,617	–	Report	29. Owens, 2. Flynn, 3. Dean, 19. Phelps, 4. Isa, 34. Mellor, 7. Hanbury, 10. Davies, 13. Clarke, 17. Pickersgill, 11. Winterstein, 21. Allen, 24. Haggerty	16. Kavanagh, 22. Leuluai, 28. Gerrard, 35. McShane	-

===== Player appearances =====
FB	CE	WI	SO	SH	PR	HK	SR	LF	IN	Yellow card

No	Player	1	2	3	4	5	6	7	8	9	10	11	12	13	14	15	16	17	18	19	20	21	22	23	24	25	26	27
1	Shaun Briscoe	x	x	x	FB	FB	FB	FB	x	FB	x	x	x	x	x	x	x	x	B	x	x	x	x	x	x	FB	FB	x
2	Paddy Flynn	x	W	W	W	W	W	W	W	W	W	W	W	W	W	W	W	W	W	x	x	x	x	x	x	W	W	W
3	Chris Dean	W	C	x	x	x	x	x	C	C	C	C	x	C	C	C	C	C	C	C	C	C	C	C	C	x	x	C
4	Willie Isa	C	C	C	C	C	W	W	W	W	C	C	C	W	x	B	B	C	C	W	W	W	W	W	W	W	W	W
5	Patrick Ah Van	W	W	W	W	W	x	x	x	x	W	W	W	x	W	W	W	W	W	W	W	W	W	W	W	x	x	x
6	Lloyd White	B	SO	SO	SO	SO	B	B	H	H	B	B	B	B	B	x	x	x	x	x	x	x	x	x	x	x	x	x
7	Rhys Hanbury	SO	SH	SH	SH	SH	x	x	SH	SH	SH	SH	x	SO	SH	SH	SH	SH	SO	SO	SH	SH	SH	SH	SH	SH	SH	SH
8	Ben Cross	P	P	P	P	P	x	x	P	P	B	P	P	P	P	P	P	P	P	P	P	P	P	x	x	x	x	x
9	Scott Moore	H	H	x	x	x	x	x	B	B	H	B	x	x	x	x	x	x	x	x	x	x	x	x	x	x	x	x
10	Ben Davies	x	P	P	P	P	P	x	B	B	x	B	x	B	B	B	B	B	B	B	B	B	B	P	P	P	B	P
11	Frank Winterstein	SR	SR	SR	SR	SR	SR	SR	SR	SR	x	SR	SR	SR	SR	SR	SR	SR	SR	SR	SR	SR	SR	SR	SR	SR	SR	SR
12	Hep Cahill	L	L	x	L	L	L	L	L	x	P	L	L	P	L	L	P	L	L	L	L	L	L	L	L	L	L	x
13	Jon Clarke	SH	x	H	H	H	H	H	x	x	x	H	H	H	H	H	x	SO	x	H	H	x	x	B	x	H	H	H
14	Anthony Watts	x	x	B	x	x	x	x	x	x	x	x	x	x	x	x	x	x	x	x	x	x	x	x	x	x	x	x
15	Simon Finnigan	x	B	x	B	B	B	B	SR	L	SR	SR	x	L	x	x	x	x	x	x	x	x	x	x	x	x	x	x
16	Ben Kavanagh	P	B	B	x	x	x	x	x	x	x	x	x	x	x	x	x	x	x	x	x	x	x	x	x	B	B	B
17	Steve Pickersgill	B	x	x	B	B	P	P	B	B	x	x	P	B	P	P	B	P	P	P	P	P	P	P	P	x	P	P
18	Sione Kite	x	x	x	x	x	B	B	P	P	P	P	x	x	x	x	x	x	x	B	B	B	B	B	B	P	P	x
19	Cameron Phelps	x	x	x	x	x	C	C	FB	C	FB	x	FB	FB	FB	FB	FB	FB	FB	FB	FB	FB	x	FB	FB	C	C	C
20	Stefan Marsh	C	x	C	C	C	C	C	C	x	x	x	C	C	C	C	C	x	x	C	C	C	C	C	C	C	C	x
21	David Allen	SR	SR	SR	SR	SR	SR	SR	B	SR	SR	B	B	SR	SR	x	L	SR	SR	SR	SR	SR	SR	SR	SR	SR	SR	SR
22	Macgraff Leuluai	x	x	B	x	x	x	x	x	B	L	x	B	B	x	B	B	B	x	x	x	x	x	x	B	x	x	B
23	Thomas Coyle	x	x	x	x	x	x	x	x	x	x	x	x	x	x	x	x	x	x	x	x	x	x	x	x	x	x	x
24	Kurt Haggerty	B	B	L	x	x	x	x	x	x	B	x	SR	x	B	SR	SR	B	x	x	x	x	B	B	H	B	x	L
25	Danny Craven	FB	FB	FB	B	B	SH	SH	x	x	SO	SO	SO	x	x	x	x	x	B	x	x	B	B	SO	SO	SO	SO	x
26	Anthony Mullally	B	B	B	B	B	B	B	x	x	x	x	B	x	B	x	x	x	x	x	x	x	x	x	x	x	x	x
27	Grant Gore	x	x	x	x	x	x	x	x	x	x	x	x	x	x	x	x	x	x	x	x	x	x	x	B	x	x	x
28	Alex Gerrard	x	x	x	x	x	x	x	x	x	B	x	x	x	x	B	x	x	B	x	x	x	x	B	B	B	B	B
29	Jack Owens	x	x	x	x	x	x	x	x	x	x	FB	x	x	x	x	x	x	x	x	x	x	FB	x	x	x	x	FB
30	Tom Gilmore	x	x	x	x	x	x	x	x	x	x	x	x	x	x	x	x	B	x	x	x	x	x	x	x	x	x	x
31	Alex Brown	x	x	x	x	x	x	x	x	x	x	x	x	x	x	x	x	x	x	x	x	x	x	x	x	x	x	x
32	Gareth O'Brien	x	x	x	x	x	SO	SO	SO	SO	x	x	x	x	x	x	x	x	x	x	x	x	x	x	x	x	x	x
33	Joe Mellor	x	x	x	x	x	x	x	x	x	x	x	SH	SH	SO	SO	SO	x	SH	SH	SO	SO	SO	x	x	x	x	SO
34	Paul McShane	x	x	x	x	x	x	x	x	x	x	x	x	x	x	x	H	H	H	B	B	H	H	H	x	B	B	B
35	Eamon O'Carroll	x	x	x	x	x	x	x	x	x	x	x	x	x	x	x	x	x	x	B	B	B	x	x	x	x	x	x

=== Challenge Cup ===
==== Fixtures and results ====
LEGEND
Win
Draw
Loss

Vikings score is first.

Date	Competition	Vrs	H/A	Venue	Result	Score	Tries	Goals	Att	Report
14 April 2012	Challenge Cup	Saints	H	Halton Stadium	L	38–40	Ah Van (2), Hanbury, White (2), Haggerty, Cahill	Ah Van 5/7	3,069	Report

==== Player appearances ====
- Challenge Cup

FB	CE	WI	SO	SH	PR	HK	SR	LF	IN	Yellow card

No	Player	RD4
1	Shaun Briscoe	x
2	Paddy Flynn	W
3	Chris Dean	C
4	Willie Isa	C
5	Patrick Ah Van	W
6	Lloyd White	B
7	Rhys Hanbury	SH
8	Ben Cross	P
9	Scott Moore	x
10	Ben Davies	x
11	Frank Winterstein	SR
12	Hep Cahill	L
13	Jon Clarke	H
14	Anthony Watts	x
15	Simon Finnigan	x
16	Ben Kavanagh	x
17	Steve Pickersgill	P
18	Sione Kite	B
19	Cameron Phelps	x
20	Stefan Marsh	x
21	David Allen	x
22	Macgraff Leuluai	B
23	Thomas Coyle	x
24	Kurt Haggerty	SR
25	Danny Craven	SO
26	Anthony Mullally	B
27	Grant Gore	x
28	Alex Gerrard	x
29	Jack Owens	FB
30	Tom Gilmore	x
31	Alex Brown	x
32	Name	x

== Statistics ==
=== Team ===
Team stats will be here.

=== Squad ===
- Appearances and points include (Super League, Challenge Cup and Play-offs) as of 15 September 2012.

No	Player	Position	Age	Previous club	Contracted until	Apps	Tries	Goals	DG	Points
1	Shaun Briscoe	Fullback	28	Hull Kingston Rovers	2013	8	4	0	0	16
2	Paddy Flynn	Wing	24	Widnes Vikings	2014	21	9	0	0	36
3	Chris Dean	Centre	24	Wakefield Trinity Wildcats	2013	20	4	0	0	16
4	Willie Isa	Centre	23	Castleford Tigers	2013	27	2	0	0	8
5	Patrick Ah Van	Wing	23	Bradford Bulls	2013	20	16	34	0	132
6	Lloyd White	Stand off	23	Crusaders	2013	15	5	0	1	21
7	Rhys Hanbury	Scrum-half	26	Crusaders	2013	25	14	25	1	107
8	Ben Cross	Prop	33	Wigan Warriors	2012	21	2	0	0	8
9	Scott Moore	Hooker	24	St Helens R.F.C.	2014	6	0	0	0	0
10	Ben Davies	Prop	22	Wigan Warriors	2012	24	3	0	0	12
11	Frank Winterstein	Second row	25	Crusaders	2013	27	7	0	0	28
12	Hep Cahill	Second row	25	Crusaders	2014	25	2	0	0	8
13	Jon Clarke	Loose forward	32	Warrington Wolves	2014	19	0	0	0	0
14	Anthony Watts	Half-back	25	Sydney Roosters	2013	1	0	0	0	0
15	Simon Finnigan	Second row	30	Widnes Vikings	2012	10	0	0	0	0
16	Ben Kavanagh	Prop	23	Widnes Vikings	2014	6	0	0	0	0
17	Steve Pickersgill	Prop	26	Widnes Vikings	2012	23	0	0	0	0
18	Sione Kite	Prop	24	Melbourne Storm	2012	15	1	0	0	4
19	Cameron Phelps	Fullback	26	Hull F.C.	2012	20	8	0	0	32
20	Stefan Marsh	Centre	21	Wigan Warriors – Loan	2012	20	7	0	0	28
21	David Allen	Second row	26	Widnes Vikings	2012	26	2	0	0	8
22	Macgraff Leuluai	Second row	21	Widnes Vikings	2013	11	0	0	0	0
23	Thomas Coyle	Hooker	23	Widnes Vikings	2012	0	0	0	0	0
24	Kurt Haggerty	Second row	22	Widnes Vikings	2014	15	3	0	0	12
25	Danny Craven	Fullback	20	Widnes Vikings	2012	18	5	2	0	24
26	Anthony Mullally	Prop	20	Widnes Vikings	2012	10	0	0	0	0
27	Grant Gore	Half-back	20	Widnes Vikings	2012	1	0	0	0	0
28	Alex Gerrard	Prop	20	Widnes Vikings	2012	8	0	0	0	0
29	Jack Owens	Fullback	17	Widnes Vikings	2012	4	0	0	0	0
30	Tom Gilmore	Half-back	17	Widnes Vikings	2012	1	0	0	0	0
31	Alex Brown	Wing	18	Widnes Vikings	2012	0	0	0	0	0
32	Gareth O'Brien	Stand off	0	Warrington Wolves – On Loan	2012	4	0	15	0	30
33	Joe Mellor	Scrum-half	19	Wigan Warriors – On Loan	2012	11	4	0	0	16
34	Paul McShane	Hooker	22	Leeds Rhinos – On Loan	2012	11	3	4	0	20
35	Eamon O'Carroll	Prop	N/A	Hull F.C.	2014	3	1	0	0	4

= Injured = Suspended
