= 2013 Widnes Vikings season =

Rugby league team season

- Super League rank: 10th
- Challenge Cup: Quarter-finals
← 2012	2014 →

In the 2013 rugby league season, Widnes Vikings competed in Super League XVIII and the 2013 Challenge Cup. They finished tenth in the league and did not qualify for the play-offs. In the Challenge Cup they reached the quarter-finals.

== Results ==
=== Pre-season friendlies ===
W Win D Draw L Loss

Pre-season results
Date	Versus	H/A	Venue	Result	Score	Tries	Goals	Attendance	Report
26 December	Warrington Wolves	H	Stobart Stadium	L	22–30			3,696	
13 January	Workington Town	A	Derwent Park	W	30–6				
20 January	Huddersfield Giants	A	John Smith's Stadium	L	12–36				

=== Super League ===
==== League table ====
Super League XVIII
Pos	Team	Pld	W	D	L	PF	PA	PD	Pts	Qualification
1	Huddersfield Giants (L)	27	21	0	6	851	507	+344	42	Play-offs
2	Warrington Wolves	27	20	1	6	836	461	+375	41	Play-offs
3	Leeds Rhinos	27	18	1	8	712	507	+205	37	Play-offs
4	Wigan Warriors (C)	27	17	1	9	816	460	+356	35	Play-offs
5	St. Helens	27	15	1	11	678	536	+142	31	Play-offs
6	Hull F.C.	27	13	2	12	652	563	+89	28	Play-offs
7	Catalans Dragons	27	13	2	12	619	604	+15	28	Play-offs
8	Hull Kingston Rovers	27	13	0	14	642	760	−118	26	Play-offs
9	Bradford Bulls	27	10	2	15	640	658	−18	22	
10	Widnes Vikings	27	10	2	15	695	841	−146	22	
11	Wakefield Trinity Wildcats	27	10	1	16	660	749	−89	21	
12	Castleford Tigers	27	9	2	16	702	881	−179	20	
13	London Broncos	27	5	2	20	487	946	−459	12	
14	Salford City Reds	27	6	1	20	436	953	−517	11 (Note: Salford deducted 2 points on 14 June 2013 for fielding 14 players during home game against Castleford)	

Source: superleague.co.uk and BBC Sport
Rules for classification: 1st on competition points; 2nd on match points difference. Competition points: for win = 2; for draw = 1; for loss = 0.
(C) Champions; (L) League Leaders' Shield Winners

==== Super League results ====
W Win D Draw L Loss

Super League results
Date	Round	Versus	H/A	Venue	Result	Score	Tries	Goals	Attendance	Report
3 February	1	London Broncos	A	Twickenham Stoop	W	28–14	Marsh (2), Allen, Clarke, Winterstein	Hanbury (4/5)	2,856	
10 February	2	St Helens	H	Stobart Stadium	L	4–16	Marsh		8,322	
17 February	3	Hull Kingston Rovers	A	Craven Park	L	18–44	Gerard, Hanbury, Hock	Hanbury (3/3)	7,247	
2 March	5	Hull F.C.	H	Stobart Stadium	W	36–16	Flynn (2), Phelps (2), Dean, Hock, Winterstein	Ah Van (2/4), Hanbury (2/3)	5,541	
8 March	6	Bradford Bulls	H	Stobart Stadium	D	22–22	Ah Van (2), Hanbury, White	Ah Van (3/5)	5,861	
16 March	7	Catalans Dragons	A	Stade Gilbert Brutus	L	14–46	Ah Van (2), Allen	Ah Van (1/3)	7,357	
23 March	8	Wigan Warriors	A	DW Stadium	L	4–62	White		11,904	
29 March	9	Warrington Wolves	H	Stobart Stadium	W	38–22	Flynn (2), Hanbury (2), Ah Van, White	Ah Van (7/7)	9,271	
1 April	10	Huddersfield Giants	A	John Smith's Stadium	L	6–62	Mellor	Gilmore (1/1)	4,270	
7 April	11	Salford City Reds	H	Stobart Stadium	W	58–22	Hanbury (3), Phelps (3), Brown, Clarke, Mellor, Winterstein	Owens (9/10)	5,562	
13 April	12	Castleford Tigers	A	Wish Communications Stadium	L	26–28	Ah Van, Clarke, Flynn, Hanbury, Phelps	Ah Van (3/6)	3,986	
26 April	13	Wakefield Trinity Wildcats	H	Stobart Stadium	L	26–28	Brown (2), Dean, Joseph, Mellor	Ah Van (2/4), Brown (1/1)	5,405	
3 May	14	St Helens	A	Langtree Park	W	35–28	Owens (2), Clarke, Marsh, Mellor, Pickersgill	Owens (4/5), Craven (1/1 + DG)	11,438	
17 May	15	Huddersfield Giants	H	Stobart Stadium	L	22–36	Marsh (2), Flynn, White	Owens (3/4)	5,173	
26 May	16	Salford City Reds	N (Note: Magic Weekend)	Etihad Stadium	L	22–28	Mellor (3), Brown	Owens (3/4)	31,249	
2 June	17	Catalans Dragons	H	Stobart Stadium	D	32–32	Owens (2), Winterstein (2), Flynn, Phelps	Owens (4/7)	4,560	
7 June	18	Wigan Warriors	H	Stobart Stadium	L	32–33	Ah Van (3), Hanbury, Lawton, Winterstein	Owens (4/6)	6,528	
17 June	4	Leeds Rhinos	A	Headingley Carnegie Stadium	L	28–38	Hanbury (2), Mellor (2), Brown	Owens (4/5)	12,782	
23 June	19	Bradford Bulls	A	Provident Stadium	W	32–28	Ah Van (2), Hanbury (2), Marsh (2)	Owens (4/6)	8,124	
30 June	20	Leeds Rhinos	H	Stobart Stadium	L	36–52	Brown (3), Hock (2), Hanbury	Owens (6/6)	6,230	
8 July	21	Wakefield Trinity Wildcats	A	Rapid Solicitors Stadium	L	14–24	Ah Van, Hanbury, Hock	Owens (1/3)	7,543	
19 July	22	London Broncos	H	Stobart Stadium	W	38–12	Lawton (3), Owens (2), Cahill, Mellor	Owens (5/7)	4,870	
2 August	23	Hull F.C.	A	KC Stadium	L	10–72	Brown, Phelps	Owens (1/2)	10,500	
11 August	24	Castleford Tigers	H	Stobart Stadium	L	38–42	Hock (4), Winterstein (2), Hanbury, Mellor	Marsh (2/2), Owens (1/4), Ah Van (0/2)	5,155	
15 August	25	Warrington Wolves	A	Halliwell Jones Stadium	W	16–6	Owens (2), Ah Van	Owens (2/4)	10,392	
1 September	26	Hull Kingston Rovers	H	Stobart Stadium	W	36–22	Ah Van, Brown, Hanbury, Lawton, Mellor, Winterstein	Owens (6/6)	5,713	
6 September	27	Salford City Reds	A	Salford City Stadium	W	24–4	Ah Van (2), Mellor (2)	Owens (3/3), Hock (1/1)	3,775	

=== Challenge Cup ===
W Win L Loss

Challenge Cup results
Date	Round	Versus	H/A	Venue	Result	Score	Tries	Goals	Attendance	Report
19 April	4	Doncaster	H	Stobart Stadium	W	42–28	Lawton (3), Briscoe (2), Ah Van, Flynn, Leuluai	Ah Van (4/6), Owens (1/2)	1,965	
12 May	5	Workington Town	A	Derwent Park	W	36–0	Allen (2), Dean, Hock, Lawton, Marsh	Owens (6/7)	1,657	
15 July	QF	Wigan Warriors	A	DW Stadium	L	4–48	Ah Van	Owens (0/1)	6,327	

== Players ==
2013 Widnes Vikings squad
First team squad			Coaching staff
1 Shaun Briscoe; 2 Willie Isa; 3 Cameron Phelps; 4 Stefan Marsh; 5 Patrick Ah Van; 6 Kevin Brown; 7 Rhys Hanbury; 8 Ben Cross; 9 Jon Clarke; 10 Steve Pickersgill	11 Frank Winterstein; 12 David Allen; 13 Hep Cahill; 14 Joe Mellor; 15 Chris Dean; 16 Eamon O'Carroll; 17 Ben Kavanagh; 18 Lloyd White; 19 Ben Davies; 20 Paddy Flynn	21 Danny Craven; 22 Gareth Hock; 23 Phil Joseph; 24 Macgraff Leuluai; 25 Alex Gerrard; 26 Jack Owens; 27 Grant Gore; 28 Tom Gilmore; 29 Adam Lawton; 30 Declan Hulme	Head coach: Denis Betts; Legend: (c) Captain(s); (vc) Vice-captain(s); Updated: 22 June 2026; Source(s):
