= 2011 Widnes Vikings season =

- Championship Rank: 5th
- Play-off result: Elimination play-offs
- Challenge Cup: Round Five
- Northern Rail Cup: Quarter Finalists
- 2011 record: Wins: 11; draws: 1; losses: 8

Team information
- Coach: Denis Betts
- Stadium: Stobart Stadium
- Avg. attendance: 3,744 (Excluding Challenge Cup)
- High attendance: 5,021 (vs. Featherstone, 4 September)
- Low attendance: 2,376 (vs. Toulouse, 12 February)
← 2010	List of seasons	2012 →

The Widnes Vikings competed in the Championship in the 2011 season and was their first full season under new head coach Denis Betts. During this season the club was confirmed a place in the Super League under the licensing system with the announcement being made in March 2011, but failed to improve upon their league position from the previous year again finishing 5th with 38 points.

== Squad ==
Squad Number	Player	D.O.B.	Appearances	Tries	Goals	F Goals	Points
1.	Danny Craven	21/11/91	9	8	12	0	56
2.	Dean Gaskell	12/4/83	12	3	0	0	12
3.	Richard Varkulis	21/5/82	27	7	0	0	28
4.	Steve Tyrer	16/3/89	25	22	106	0	300
5.	Paddy Flynn	11/12/87	26	14	0	0	56
6.	Anthony Thackeray	19/2/86	10	9	0	0	36
7.	Chaz I'Anson	30/11/86	21	4	0	1	17
8.	Steve Pickersgill	28/11/85	24	2	0	0	8
9.	Kirk Netherton	10/5/85	9	3	0	0	12
10.	Daniel Heckenberg	27/10/79	9	0	0	0	0
11.	Dave Allen	15/9/85	25	9	0	0	36
12.	Kurt Haggerty	8/1/89	18	4	7	0	30
13.	Simon Finnigan	8/12/81	22	9	0	0	36
14.	Thomas Coyle	10/5/88	29	5	0	0	20
15.	Chris Gerrard	1/10/89	8	1	0	0	4
16.	Macgraff Leuluai	9/2/90	24	8	0	0	32
17.	Ben Kavanagh	4/3/88	27	8	0	0	32
18.	James Ford	29/9/82	4	0	0	0	0
19.	Mat Gardner	24/8/84	25	3	0	0	12
20.	Shane Grady	13/12/89	21	4	2	0	20
22.	David Houghton	2/11/89	3	0	0	0	0
23.	Tangi Ropati	15/11/84	22	8	1	0	34
24.	Danny Hulme	15/2/91	11	8	0	0	32
25.	Chris Lunt	18/12/90	5	1	0	0	4
29.	Grant Gore	21/11/91	4	2	0	0	8
34.	Jack Owens	3/6/94	2	1	0	0	4
38.	Logan Tomkins	1/8/91	14	6	0	0	24
39.	Dominic Crosby	11/12/90	13	3	0	0	12
40.	Joe Mellor	28/11/90	14	7	0	0	28
41.	Kevin Penny	3/10/87	11	5	0	0	20
42.	Danny Sculthorpe	8/9/79	11	0	0	0	0
44.	James Coyle	28/12/85	6	0	0	0	0

== Results ==
Round	Opponent	Result	Score	HT	H/A	Attendance	Date	Tries	Goals	Field Goals	Lineup	Subs	
1	Sheffield	Won	16-44	12-22	A	1,831	13 March	Tyrer (7,25), Finnigan (20,59), Netherton (28), Allen (41,64,73)	Tyrer 6/8	N/A	Danny Craven, Dean Gaskell, James Ford, Steve Tyrer, Mat Gardner, Anthony Thackeray, Thomas Coyle, Ben Kavanagh, Kirk Netherton, Daniel Heckenberg, Shane Grady, Kurt Haggerty, Simon Finnigan	Chaz I’Anson, Steve Pickersgill, Dave Allen, Danny Sculthorpe	-
2	Hunslet	Lost	10-18	0-12	H	3,023	20 March	Varkulis (47), Thackeray (52)	Tyrer 1/2	N/A	Paddy Flynn, Dean Gaskell, James Ford, Steve Tyrer, Mat Gardner, Anthony Thackeray, Thomas Coyle, Ben Kavanagh, Kirk Netherton, Steve Pickersgill (Sin Bin - 62nd Minute - Late Challenge), Dave Allen, Kurt Haggerty, Simon Finnigan	Richard Varkulis, Chaz I’Anson, Daniel Heckenberg, Shane Grady	-
3	Leigh	Lost	54-16	8-16	A	3,198	27 March	Finnigan (19), Thackeray (29), Flynn (32)	Tyrer 2/3	N/A	Danny Craven, Paddy Flynn, Tangi Ropati, Steve Tyrer, Mat Gardner, Anthony Thackeray, Chaz I’Anson, Steve Pickersgill, Kirk Netherton, Daniel Heckenberg, Dave Allen, Simon Finnigan, Ben Kavanagh	Richard Varkulis, Thomas Coyle, Chris Gerrard, Macgraff Leuluai	-
4	York	Won	76-12	28-6	H	4,087	3 April	Flynn (15), Tyrer (18,22,40), Craven (26), Leuluai (45), Varkulis (50), Lunt (54), Thackeray (57,77) Pickersgill (65,69)	Tyrer 12/13	N/A	Danny Craven, Paddy Flynn, Tangi Ropati, Steve Tyrer, Dean Gaskell, Chris Gerrard, Chaz I’Anson, Steve Pickersgill, Thomas Coyle, Ben Kavanagh, Dave Allen, Macgraff Leuluai, Simon Finnigan (Sin Bin - 44th Minute - Fighting)	Richard Varkulis, Anthony Thackeray, Chris Lunt, Danny Sculthorpe	-
5	Batley	Lost	32-12	10-12	A	1,101	17 April	Hulme (22), Varkulis (30)	Grady 2/2	N/A	Danny Hulme, Mat Gardner, Tangi Ropati, James Ford, Paddy Flynn, Anthony Thackeray, Chaz I’Anson, Steve Pickersgill, Thomas Coyle, Daniel Heckenberg, Shane Grady, Macgraff Leuluai, Dave Allen	Richard Varkulis, Chris Gerrard, Logan Tomkins, Dominic Crosby	-
6	Halifax	Won	47-36	38-18	H	3,669	21 April	Hulme (2,7,10), Finnigan (19,55), Tomkins (24,34), Thomas Coyle (29)	Tyrer 7/10	Chaz I’Anson	Danny Hulme, Paddy Flynn, Tangi Ropati, Steve Tyrer, Mat Gardner, Chaz I’Anson, Joe Mellor, Richard Varkulis, Thomas Coyle, Ben Kavanagh, Simon Finnigan, Macgraff Leuluai, Dave Allen	Shane Grady, Dave Houghton, Logan Tomkins, Danny Sculthorpe	-
7	Barrow	Lost	30-12	24-6'	A	1,965	25 April	Mellor (21,79)	Tyrer 2/2	N/A	Danny Hulme, Paddy Flynn, Tangi Ropati, Steve Tyrer, Mat Gardner, Chaz I’Anson, Joe Mellor, Steve Pickersgill, Thomas Coyle, Ben Kavanagh, Simon Finnigan, Macgraff Leuluai, Dave Allen	Dean Gaskell, Richard Varkulis, David Houghton, Logan Tomkins	-
8	Toulouse	Won	26-12	10-6	H	3,601	28 April	Crosby (23), Gaskell (40), Mellor (42), Tomkins (48), Ropati (53)	Tyrer 3/5	N/A	Paddy Flynn, Dean Gaskell, Tangi Ropati, Steve Tyrer, Mat Gardner, Chaz I’Anson, Joe Mellor, Steve Pickersgill, Thomas Coyle, Ben Kavanagh, Simon Finnigan, Macgraff Leuluai, Dave Allen	Shane Grady, Logan Tomkins, Danny Sculthorpe, Dominic Crosby	-
9	Dewsbury	Drawn	34-34	16-24	A	1,087	15 May	I’Anson (20,30), Leuluai (25), Allen (39), Flynn (63), Tyrer (70)	Tyrer 5/6	N/A	Paddy Flynn, Dean Gaskell, Tangi Ropati, Steve Tyrer, Kevin Penny, Chaz I’Anson, Joe Mellor, Steve Pickersgill, Thomas Coyle, Ben Kavanagh, Macgraff Leulaui, Shane Grady, Dave Allen	Richard Varkulis, Logan Tomkins, Dominic Crosby, Danny Sculthorpe	-
11	Barrow	Won	42-14	22-8	H	3,331	26 May	I’Anson (6), Flynn (20), Owens (24), Penny (35), Tomkins (50), Tyrer (55), Mellor (70), Thomas Coyle (80)	Tyrer 5/8	N/A	Jack Owens, Paddy Flynn, Tangi Ropati, Steve Tyrer, Kevin Penny, Chaz I’Anson, Joe Mellor, Steve Pickersgill, Thomas Coyle, Ben Kavanagh, Simon Finnigan, Macgraff Leuluai, Dave Allen	Richard Varkulis, Mat Gardner, Logan Tomkins, Dominic Crosby	-
13	York	Won	18-22	12-12	A	1,172	12 June	Haggerty (19), Leuluai (37), Crosby (43), Ropati (53)	Haggerty 1/1, Tyrer 2/3	N/A	Paddy Flynn, Dean Gaskell, Tangi Ropati, Steve Tyrer, Kevin Penny, James Coyle, Chaz I’Anson, Steve Pickersgill, Thomas Coyle, Ben Kavanagh, Simon Finnigan, Macgraff Leuluai, Kurt Haggerty	Mat Gardner, Richard Varkulis, Chris Lunt, Dominic Crosby	-
14	Sheffield	Won	38-24	22-6	H	4,027	26 June	Hulme (10), Leuluai (13), Varkulis (25), Penny (38,58), Haggerty (50), Allen (70)	Haggerty 4/6, Ropati 1/1	N/A	Danny Hulme, Paddy Flynn, Tangi Ropati, Mat Gardner, Kevin Penny, Chaz I’Anson, Joe Mellor, Steve Pickersgill, Thomas Coyle, Ben Kavanagh, Simon Finnigan, Macgraff Leuluai, Kurt Haggerty	Richard Varkulis, Dave Allen, Dominic Crosby, James Coyle	-
15	Hunslet	Won	'22-24	16-6	A	1,101	3 July	Kavanagh (16), Tyrer (51), Grady (57), Flynn (63), Haggerty (80)	Tyrer 2/5	N/A	Danny Hulme, Paddy Flynn, Tangi Ropati, Steve Tyrer, Mat Gardner, Joe Mellor, Chaz I’Anson, Steve Pickersgill, Thomas Coyle, Richard Varkulis, Macgraff Leuluai, Kurt Haggerty, Ben Kavanagh	Shane Grady, Danny Sculthorpe, Logan Tomkins, Dominic Crosby	-
16	Dewsbury	Won	36-22	24-10	H	4,030	10 July	Gore (3), Tomkins (6), Kavanagh (13.50), Tyrer (34), Penny (46)	Tyrer 6/6	N/A	Danny Hulme, Paddy Flynn, Mat Gardner, Steve Tyrer, Kevin Penny, Grant Gore, Thomas Coyle, Ben Kavanagh, Logan Tomkins, Dominic Crosby, Macgraff Leuluai, Simon Finnigan, Kurt Haggerty	Richard Varkulis, Dave Allen, Shane Grady, Danny Sculthorpe	-
17	Toulouse	Won	16-30	16-12	A	1,157	23 July	Tyrer (4,15), Gardner (48), Allen (55), Finnigan (73)	Tyrer 5/5	N/A	Danny Hulme, Kevin Penny, Mat Gardner, Steve Tyrer, Paddy Flynn, Joe Mellor, Chaz I’Anson, Steve Pickersgill, Thomas Coyle, Ben Kavanagh, Shane Grady, Simon Finnigan, Kurt Haggerty	Richard Varkulis, Dave Allen, Macgraff Leuluai, Logan Tomkins	-
18	Batley	Won	24-22	16-20	H	3,873	31 July	Kavanagh (2), Flynn (24), Mellor (37), Penny (61)	Tyrer 4/5	N/A	Danny Hulme, Paddy Flynn, Mat Gardner, Steve Tyrer, Kevin Penny, Chaz I’Anson, Joe Mellor, Steve Pickersgill, Thomas Coyle, Ben Kavanagh, Shane Grady, Simon Finnigan, Kurt Haggerty	Richard Varkulis, Dave Allen, Macgraff Leuluai, Dominic Crosby	-
19	Leigh	Lost	18-24	18-12	H	4,732	7 August	Tyrer (5), Crosby (30), Tomkins (37)	Tyrer 3/3	N/A	Danny Hulme, Kevin Penny, Steve Tyrer, Mat Gardner, Paddy Flynn, Joe Mellor, Chaz I’Anson, Ben Kavanagh, Thomas Coyle, Steve Pickersgill, Macgraff Leuluai, Simon Finnigan, Dave Allen	Shane Grady, Richard Varkulis, Dominic Crosby, Logan Tomkins	-
20	Halifax	Lost	26-24	12-18	A	2,090	11 August	Hulme (14), Mellor (25,39), Varkulis (50)	Tyrer 4/4	N/A	Danny Hulme, Kevin Penny, Steve Tyrer, Tangi Ropati, Paddy Flynn, Joe Mellor, James Coyle, Dominic Crosby, Thomas Coyle, Steve Pickersgill, Simon Finnigan, Shane Grady, Kurt Haggerty	Richard Varkulis, Dave Allen, Logan Tomkins, Ben Kavanagh	-
10	Featherstone	Lost	56-16	26-0	A	2,021	17 August	Hulme (47,76), Grady (74)	Haggerty 2/3	N/A	Danny Hulme, Paddy Flynn, Tangi Ropati, Steve Tyrer, Mat Gardner, Joe Mellor, James Coyle, Steve Pickersgill, Thomas Coyle, Ben Kavanagh, Shane Grady, Simon Finnigan, Dave Allen	Richard Varkulis, Kurt Haggerty, Macgraff Leuluai, Logan Tomkins	-
22	Featherstone	Lost	4-44	0-16	H	5,021	4 September	Craven (55)	Haggerty 0/1	N/A	Danny Craven, Paddy Flynn, Steve Tyrer, Shane Grady, Kevin Penny, James Coyle, Joe Mellor, Steve Pickersgill (Sin Bin - 62nd Minute - Punching), Thomas Coyle, Ben Kavanagh, Macgraff Leuluai, Dave Allen, Kurt Haggerty	Richard Varkulis, Chaz I’Anson, Dominic Crosby, Logan Tomkins	-
Elimination play-offs	Sheffield	Lost	36-20	14-4	A	564	9 September	Flynn (14,50), Ropati (66), Craven (74)	Craven 2/4	N/A	Danny Craven, Paddy Flynn, Tangi Ropati, Shane Grady, Mat Gardner, Joe Mellor, James Coyle, Steve Pickersgill, Thomas Coyle, Ben Kavanagh, Macgraff Leuluai, Simon Finnigan, Dave Allen	Richard Varkulis, Kurt Haggerty, Logan Tomkins, Dominic Crosby	-

Northern Rail Cup Results

Round	Opponent	Result	Score	HT	H/A	Attendance	Date	Tries	Goals	Field Goals	Lineup	Subs	
Rd.1 - Pool One	London Skolars	Won	18-62	8-34	A	643	6 February	Flynn (11,77), Allen (19), Craven (26,39), Kavanagh (39), Gardner (40), Thomas Coyle (48), Thackeray (51), Haggerty (70), Ropati (74)	Craven 9/11	N/A	Danny Craven, Mat Gardner, James Ford, Tangi Ropati, Paddy Flynn, Anthony Thackeray, Thomas Coyle, Richard Varkulis, Kirk Netherton, Daniel Heckenberg, Dave Allen, Macgraff Leuluai, Ben Kavanagh	Steve Pickersgill, Kurt Haggerty, Simon Finnigan, Grant Gore	-
Rd.2 Pool One	Toulouse	Won	44-28	12-36	H	2,376	12 February	Allen (9), Thackeray (16,54), Ropati (51), Tyrer (67), Netherton (73), Gerrard (75), Kavanagh (78)	Tyrer 6/8	N/A	Danny Craven, Paddy Flynn, Tangi Ropati, Steve Tyrer, Mat Gardner, Anthony Thackeray, Thomas Coyle, Ben Kavanagh, Kirk Netherton, Daniel Heckenberg, Dave Allen, Macgraff Leuluai, Kurt Haggerty	Richard Varkulis, Chris Gerrard, Shane Grady, Gareth Frodsham	-
Rd.3 Pool One	Rochdale	Won	50-10	22-10	H	3,155	20 February	Netherton (4), Thomas Coyle (13), Craven (19), Grady (38), Tyrer (44,79), Finnigan (49), Ropati (54), Thackeray (73)	Tyrer 6/7, Craven 1/2	N/A	Anthony Thackeray, Dean Gaskell, Tangi Ropati, Steve Tyrer, Mat Gardner, Danny Craven, Thomas Coyle, Ben Kavanagh, Kirk Netherton, Daniel Heckenberg, Shane Grady, Kurt Haggerty, Simon Finnigan	Richard Varkulis, Chris Gerrard, Macgraff Leuluai, Chris Lunt	-
Rd.4 Pool One	Featherstone	Won	16-22	0-18	A	1,719	26 February	Grady (3), Tyrer (8), Thackeray (32)	Tyrer 5/5	N/A	Paddy Flynn, Dean Gaskell, Tangi Ropati, Steve Tyrer, Mat Gardner, Anthony Thackeray, Thomas Coyle, Ben Kavanagh, Kirk Netherton, Daniel Heckenberg, Shane Grady, Kurt Haggerty, Simon Finnigan	Richard Varkulis, Steve Pickersgill, Dave Allen, Chris Gerrard	-
Quarter Finals	Leigh	Lost	50-18	22-18	A	2,737	7 April	Kavanagh (12,16), Leuluai (19)	Tyrer 3/4	N/A	Anthony Thackeray, Dean Gaskell, Tangi Ropati, Steve Tyrer, Paddy Flynn, Chris Gerrard, Chaz I’Anson, Steve Pickersgill, Thomas Coyle, Ben Kavanagh, Dave Allen, Macgraff Leuluai, Simon Finnigan	Richard Varkulis, Kirk Netherton, Mat Gardner, Danny Sculthorpe	-

Challenge Cup Results

Round	Opponent	Result	Score	HT	H/A	Attendance	Date	Tries	Goals	Field Goals	Lineup	Subs	
3	Siddal	Won	6-54	6-16	A	951	6 March	Tyrer (4,43,45), Craven (22,49), Finnigan (25), Gaskell (60,74), I’Anson (65), Gardner (70)	Tyrer 7/10	N/A	Jack Owens, Dean Gaskell, Tangi Ropati, Steve Tyrer, Mat Gardner, Danny Craven, Thomas Coyle, Ben Kavanagh, Kirk Netherton, Steve Pickersgill, Kurt Haggerty, Shane Grady, Simon Finnigan	Danny Sculthorpe, Richard Varkulis, Chaz I’Anson, Chris Gerrard	-
4	London Skolars	Won	18-62	0-32	A	415	8 May	Leuluai (5,10), Thomas Coyle (18), Flynn 34,39,51,75), Ropati (37), Varkulis (46), Gore (48), Tyrer (66), Allen (80)	Tyrer 7/12	N/A	Paddy Flynn, Dean Gaskell, Tangi Ropati, Steve Tyrer, Mat Gardner, Chaz I’Anson, Thomas Coyle, Danny Sculthorpe, Chris Lunt, Daniel Heckenberg, Shane Grady, Macgraff Leuluai, Dave Allen	Richard Varkulis, Ben Kavanagh (Unused), Dave Houghton, Grant Gore	-
5	Hull F.C.	Lost	26-50	8-22	H	3,387	21 May	Leuluai (16), Tyrer (28,78), Varkulis (43), Ropati (61)	Tyrer 3/5	N/A	Paddy Flynn, Kevin Penny, Tangi Ropati, Steve Tyrer, Mat Gardner, Chaz I’Anson, Thomas Coyle, Steve Pickersgill, Chris Lunt, Ben Kavanagh, Kurt Haggerty, Macgraff Leuluai, Dave Allen	Richard Varkulis, Shane Grady, Grant Gore, Danny Sculthorpe	-
