= Alex Gerrard =

Alex Gerrard may refer to:

- Alex Gerrard (rugby league) (born 1991), English rugby league footballer
- Alex Gerrard (model), model and wife of footballer Steven Gerrard
