= Tangi Ropati =

Samoa international rugby league footballer

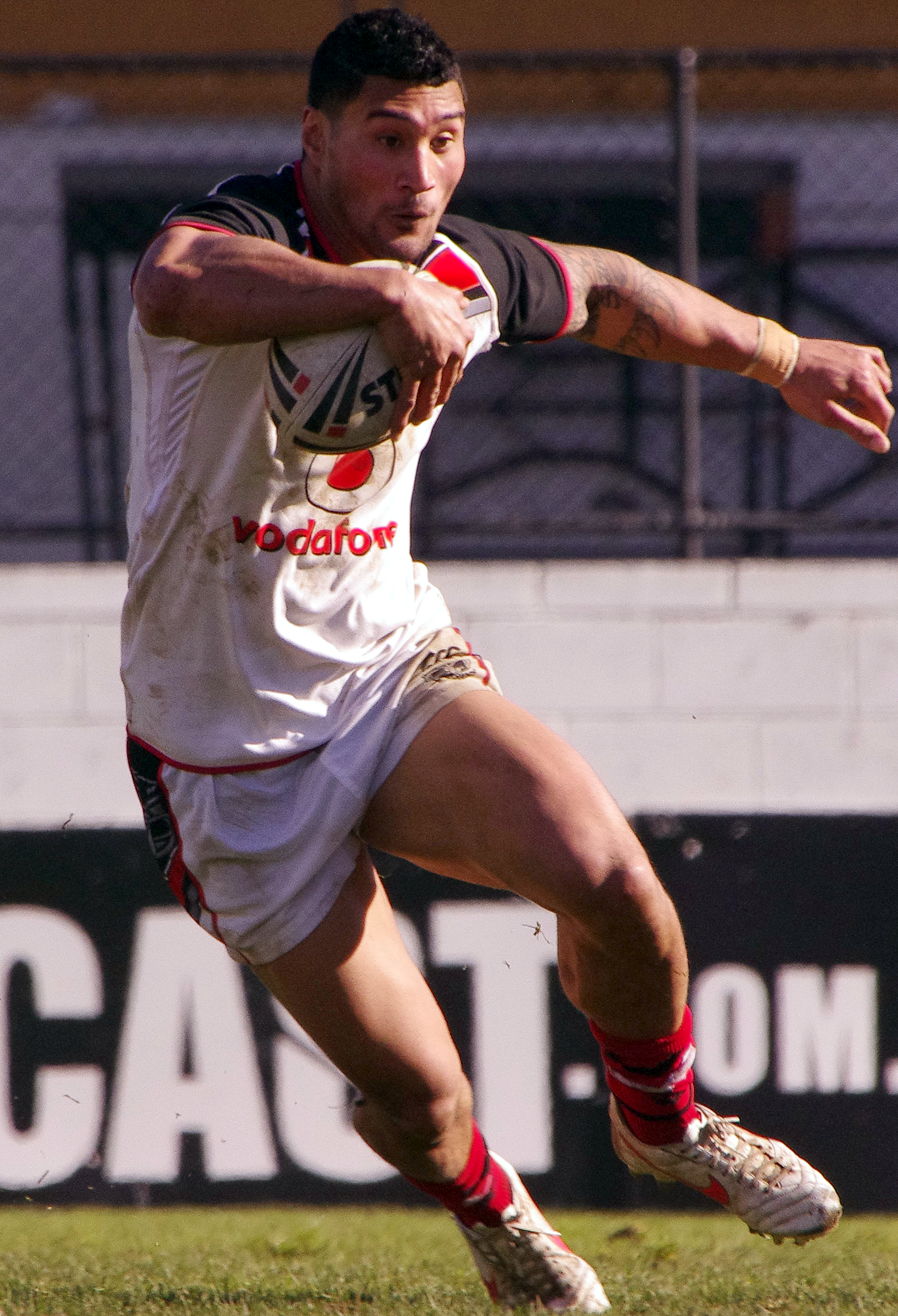

Personal information
- Born: 15 November 1984 (age 41) New Zealand
- Height: 1.81 m (5 ft 11 in)
- Weight: 98 kg (15 st 6 lb)

Playing information
- Position: Fullback, Wing, Centre
Club
Years	Team	Pld	T	G	FG	P
2009–10	Sheffield Eagles	50	27	14	0	136
2011	Widnes Vikings	20	7	1	0	30
2012	Featherstone Rovers	16	16	0	0	64
	Total	86	50	15	0	230
Representative
Years	Team	Pld	T	G	FG	P
2006–08	Samoa	7	0	0	0	0
- Source: As of 13 November 2014

Tangi Ropati (born November 15, 1984) is a former Samoa international rugby league footballer who played for the Marist Saints in the Fox Memorial. He usually plays as a fullback or centre.

== Background ==
Ropati was born in New Zealand.

== Playing career ==
Ropati played for the Marist Richmond Brothers in the 2004 Bartercard Cup.

Ropati was signed by the Sheffield Eagles in 2009 after they spotted him in the 2008 World Cup.

Ropati joined Widnes Vikings in the 2010 close season along with Chaz I'Anson, Steve Tyrer and Macgraff Leuluai as the Vikings prepared for Super League.

Ropati was released from Widnes and in 2012 joined Championship winners Featherstone Rovers.

=== Featherstone Rovers ===
Ropati scored the opening try for Rovers against arch rivals Castleford Tigers in the Challenge Cup 4th Round tie on Saturday, 14 April 2012.

=== Return to New Zealand ===
In 2013 he was contracted to the Auckland Vulcans in the NSW Cup.

In 2014 he played for the Marist Saints in the Auckland Rugby League competition and the Akarana Falcons in the NZRL National Competition.

== Representative career ==
Ropati played one game for Samoa in the 2008 World Cup.

In 2009 he was named as part of the Samoan side for the Pacific Cup.
