= Greg Scott (rugby league) =

Personal information
- Full name: Gregory Scott
- Born: 21 June 1991 (age 35)

Playing information
- Position: Wing
Club
Years	Team	Pld	T	G	FG	P
2010	Widnes Vikings	1	0	0	0	0
2012–15	Dewsbury Rams	61	21	0	0	84
2016	Swinton Lions	5	3	0	0	12
	Total	67	24	0	0	96

Greg Scott (born 21 June 1991) is a professional rugby league footballer who most recently played for the Swinton Lions in the Kingstone Press Championship. He plays on the wing.

Scott came through the Widnes Vikings Academy.

Scott has previously played for Swinton, Widnes and the Dewsbury Rams.
