= Sione Kite =

Australian rugby league footballer

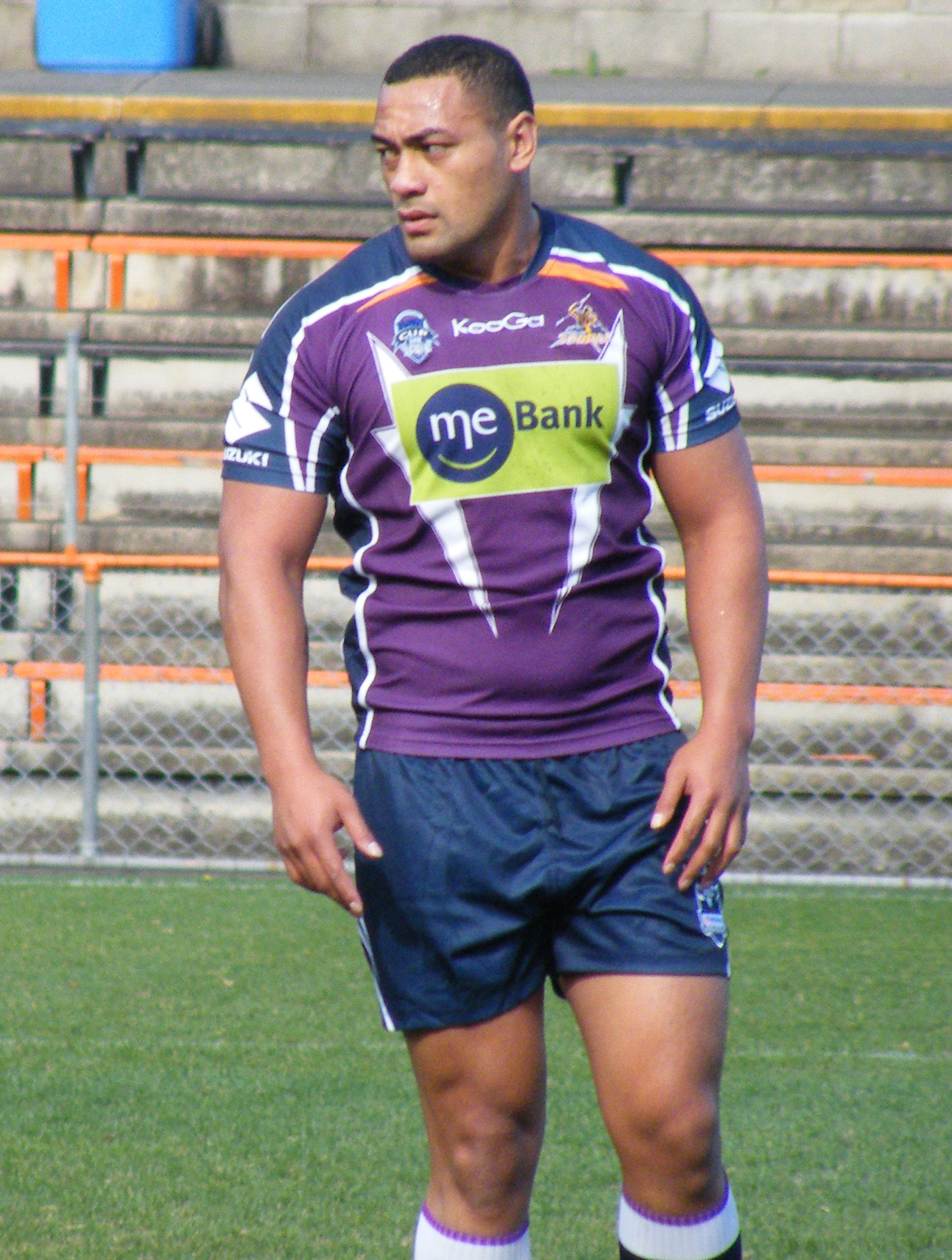
- Kite playing for the Storm in 2010

Personal information
- Born: 14 January 1988 (age 38) Canterbury, New South Wales, Australia
- Height: 195 cm (6 ft 5 in)
- Weight: 120 kg (18 st 13 lb)

Playing information
- Position: Prop, Second-row
Club
Years	Team	Pld	T	G	FG	P
2008–09	Canterbury Bulldogs	9	0	0	0	0
2010–11	Melbourne Storm	3	0	0	0	0
2012	Widnes Vikings	15	1	0	0	4
	Total	27	1	0	0	4

Sione Kite (born 14 January 1988), also known as John Kite, is an Australian rugby league footballer for the Thirlmere Roosters in the Group 6 Rugby League. He previously played for the Canterbury-Bankstown Bulldogs and Melbourne Storm in the National Rugby League and the Widnes Vikings in the Super League. He primarily plays prop and second-row.

== Playing career ==
Born in Canterbury, New South Wales, Kite played his junior football for the St. John Eagles and St. George before being signed by the Canterbury-Bankstown Bulldogs. He played for the Bulldogs' Toyota Cup team in 2008, scoring 3 tries in 15 games. In Round 17 of the 2008 NRL season he made his NRL début for the Bulldogs against the South Sydney Rabbitohs.

At the end of the 2008 season, Kite was named at prop in the 2008 Toyota Cup Team of the Year.

At the end of the 2009 season, Kite signed with the Melbourne Storm. He made his début for the Storm in Round 21 of the 2010 NRL season.

On 26 January 2012, Kite signed a 1-year contract with the Widnes Vikings in the Super League. He made his début for the Vikings in Round 6 of the 2012 Super League season.

== Representative career ==
In 2008, Kite was named in the Tonga training squad for the 2008 Rugby League World Cup but did not make the final squad.

== Personal life ==
Kite is believed to be the biggest baby born at Canterbury hospital, weighing in at 15 pounds. He completed his schooling at Hampden Park Public School, followed by Holy Spirit College.
