= Cameron Phelps =

Australian rugby league footballer (born 1985)

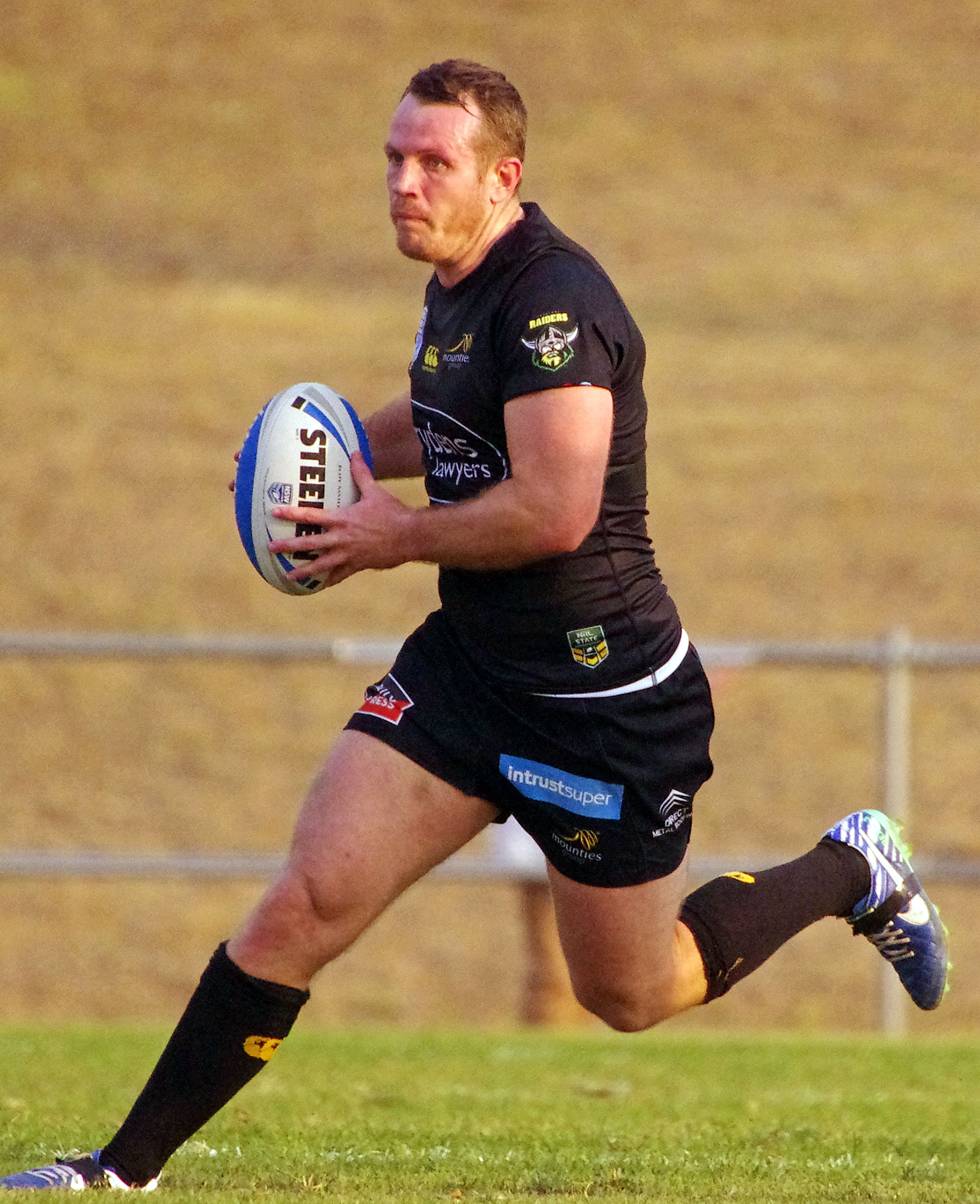

Personal information
- Full name: Cameron Ross Phelps
- Born: 11 February 1985 (age 40); Camperdown, New South Wales, Australia
- Height: 178 cm (5 ft 10 in)
- Weight: 89 kg (14 st 0 lb)

Playing information
- Position: Fullback, Wing, Centre
Club
Years	Team	Pld	T	G	FG	P
2005–08	Canterbury Bulldogs	39	12	0	0	48
2008–10	Wigan Warriors	48	16	4	0	72
2011	Hull F.C.	21	3	0	0	12
2012–15	Widnes Vikings	69	23	2	0	96
	Total	177	54	6	0	228
- Source: As of 17 January 2019

Cameron Ross Phelps (born 11 February 1985) is an Australian former professional rugby league footballer who last played for the Widnes Vikings in the Super League. He played as a fullback, wing and a centre.

== Playing career ==
Phelps made his first grade debut for Canterbury in 2005 against Manly. Phelps spent 4 years at Canterbury but mainly played in reserve grade. In 2008, Phelps joined English side Wigan.

Phelps was released by Wigan in 2010 and signed for Hull F.C. on 9 February 2011. Phelps made 20 appearances and scoring 3 tries for Hull in the 2011 season but was released from contract.

Phelps signed a two-year Super League contract with Widnes on 20 January 2012. He returned to Australia in 2015. Following in the footsteps of his successful older brother James, who writes for Sydney's The Daily Telegraph and is a novelist, Cameron writes for Mail Online.
