= Thomas Coyle (rugby league) =

English rugby league footballer

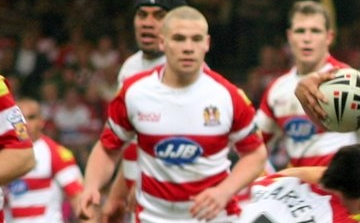

Personal information
- Born: 10 May 1988 (age 38) Wigan, England

Playing information
- Position: Hooker, Halfback
Club
Years	Team	Pld	T	G	FG	P
2008	Wigan Warriors	5	0	0	0	0
2008(loan)	→ Halifax
2009	Oldham	33	16	0	0	64
2010–12	Widnes Vikings	47	12	0	1	49
2013	Leigh Centurions	2	0	0	0	0
2013–14	Hunslet Hawks	25	4	10	1	37
2015–16	Whitehaven	37	1	0	0	4
2017	Swinton Lions	3	0	0	0	0
	Total	152	33	10	2	154
- Source: As of 19 February 2018
- Education: St. John Fisher Catholic High School, Wigan
- Relatives: James Coyle (brother)

Thomas Coyle (born 10 May 1988) is an English rugby league footballer with Hunslet Hawks. He is a scrum half.

Coyle was educated at St. John Fisher Catholic High School, Wigan. He signed for the Wigan Warriors from the local amateur team Wigan St Patricks. He moved into the Wigan Academy Under 18s in 2005.

Coyle was selected for Lancashire U17s and England U15s and U16s while part of the Wigan scholarship and Academy systems. He was also included in the England U17s squad to take on the touring Australian Institute of Sport in 2005. He signed for Halifax on loan in May, but having failed to impress was released early.

Coyle's father, Bernard Coyle, and grandfather, also Bernard Coyle, both played for Wigan at scrum-half in the 1970s and 1940s respectively. His elder brother, James, is a former Wigan Academy scrum half .
