= Hep Cahill =

New Zealand rugby league footballer

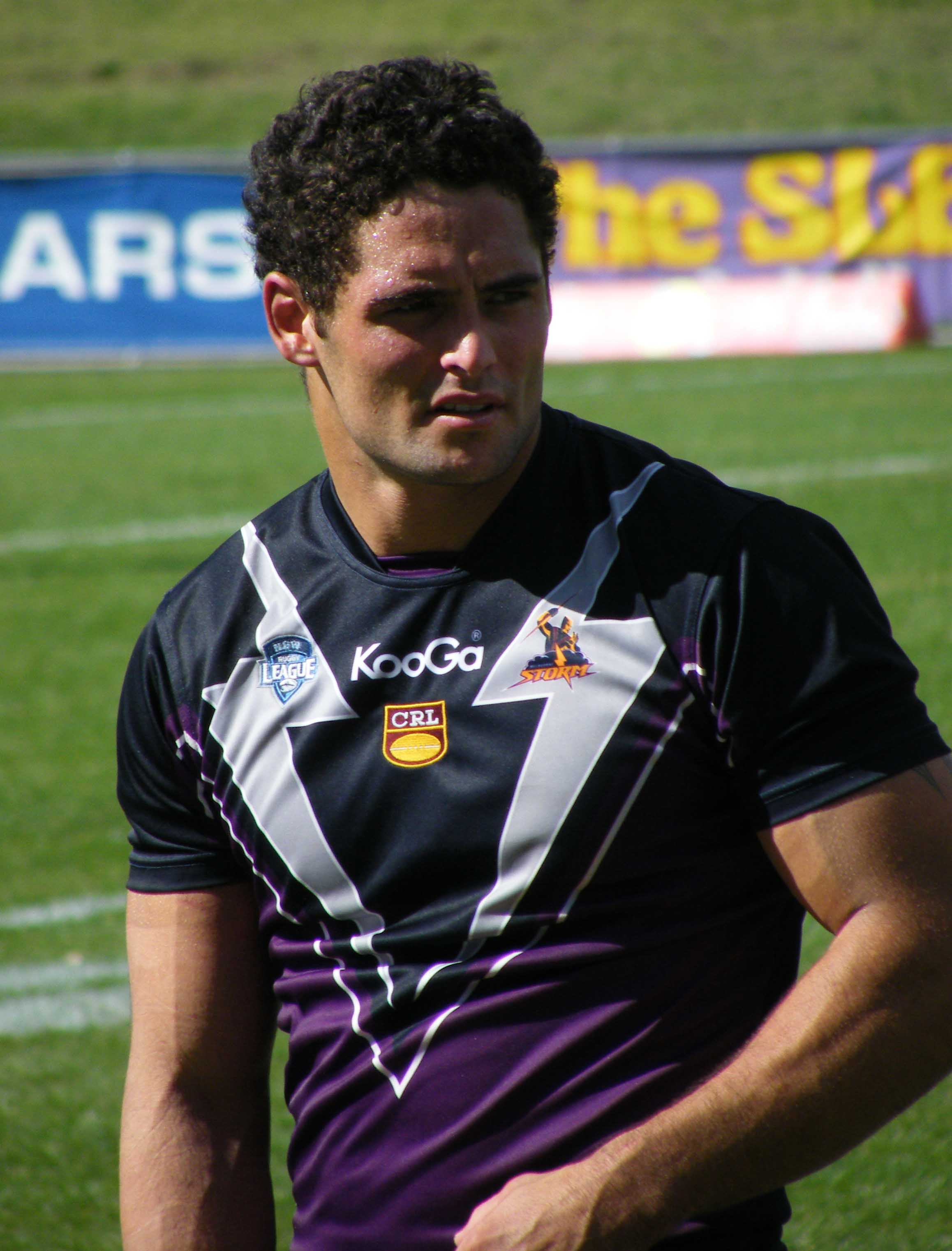

Personal information
- Full name: Hohepa Cahill
- Born: 15 October 1986 (age 40) Hastings, New Zealand

Playing information
- Height: 185 cm (6 ft 1 in)
- Weight: 99 kg (15 st 8 lb)
- Position: Second-row, Lock
Club
Years	Team	Pld	T	G	FG	P
2009–10	Melbourne Storm	9	0	0	0	0
2011	Crusaders RL	17	3	0	0	12
2012–19	Widnes Vikings	168	10	0	0	40
	Total	194	13	0	0	52
Representative
Years	Team	Pld	T	G	FG	P
2008	New Zealand Maori	1	0	0	0	0

Hohepa "Hep" Cahill (born 15 October 1986) is a New Zealand retired professional rugby league footballer who played as a second-row or loose forward in the 2000s and 2010s.

He played for the Melbourne Storm in the NRL, and Crusaders RL in the Super League. Cahill also played for the Widnes Vikings in the Super League and the Championship.

== Background ==
Cahill was born in Hastings, New Zealand.

== Playing career ==
Cahill went to Napier Boys' College in New Zealand, and is also a former age grade New Zealand kick boxing champion.

Moving to Australia, Cahill was part of the Sydney Roosters junior representative teams before moving to the Newtown Jets where he played in the NSW Cup competition in 2008. He was a member of the Jets team that lost the 2008 NSW Cup grand final in extra time against the Wentworthville Magpies. Cahill won the Jets coach's award following his performances during the season, also earning selection in the New Zealand Māori rugby league team that played against an Australian Indigenous team in an exhibition match to open the 2008 Rugby League World Cup.

At 22-years-old, Cahill signed with Melbourne Storm ahead of the 2009 season, impressing the club's conditioning team with his hard work during preseason training. Biding his time in NSW Cup with Melbourne Storm feeder club Central Coast, and after being named as a reserve earlier in the season, he finally made his NRL debut in round 20, 2009. That was the first of three NRL appearances for the Storm in 2009, not featuring in the club's finals campaign that ended with a win over the Parramatta Eels in the 2009 NRL Grand Final. For his efforts with the Central Coast team in 2009, Cahill was named the club's best forward.

He played in the 2010 World Club Challenge against the Leeds Rhinos, being part of the team that lifted the trophy. Cahill would start the 2010 NRL season in the Storm team as part of the club's bench rotation, but lost his place in the team as the season progressed. Following the exposure of the Melbourne Storm salary cap breach, Cahill was not offered a new contract by the club, ending his time in Melbourne at the end of the 2010 season.

Cahill moved to Super League club Celtic Crusaders for the 2011 season. Following the collapse of the Crusaders, he would sign with Widnes Vikings for the 2012 season, further extending his time with the club for a further two years in 2014.

In February 2012, Widnes announced they had suspended Scott Moore, Hep Cahill and Simon Finnigan for an unspecified breaches of club discipline, with the trio missing the match against Salford.

Cahill would play eight seasons with Widnes making 168 appearances. Cahill departed the club in 2019 due to salary cap and personal reasons.

He would later play for the Sarina Crocodiles in Mackay's Mercury Cup competition, coaching the team in 2021 to a premiership. He would later be an assistant coach at the Mackay Cutters in the Queensland Cup, before taking over as head coach of the Mackay Magpies in the local competition.
