= Mat Gardner =

Brazil international rugby league footballer

Matt Gardner
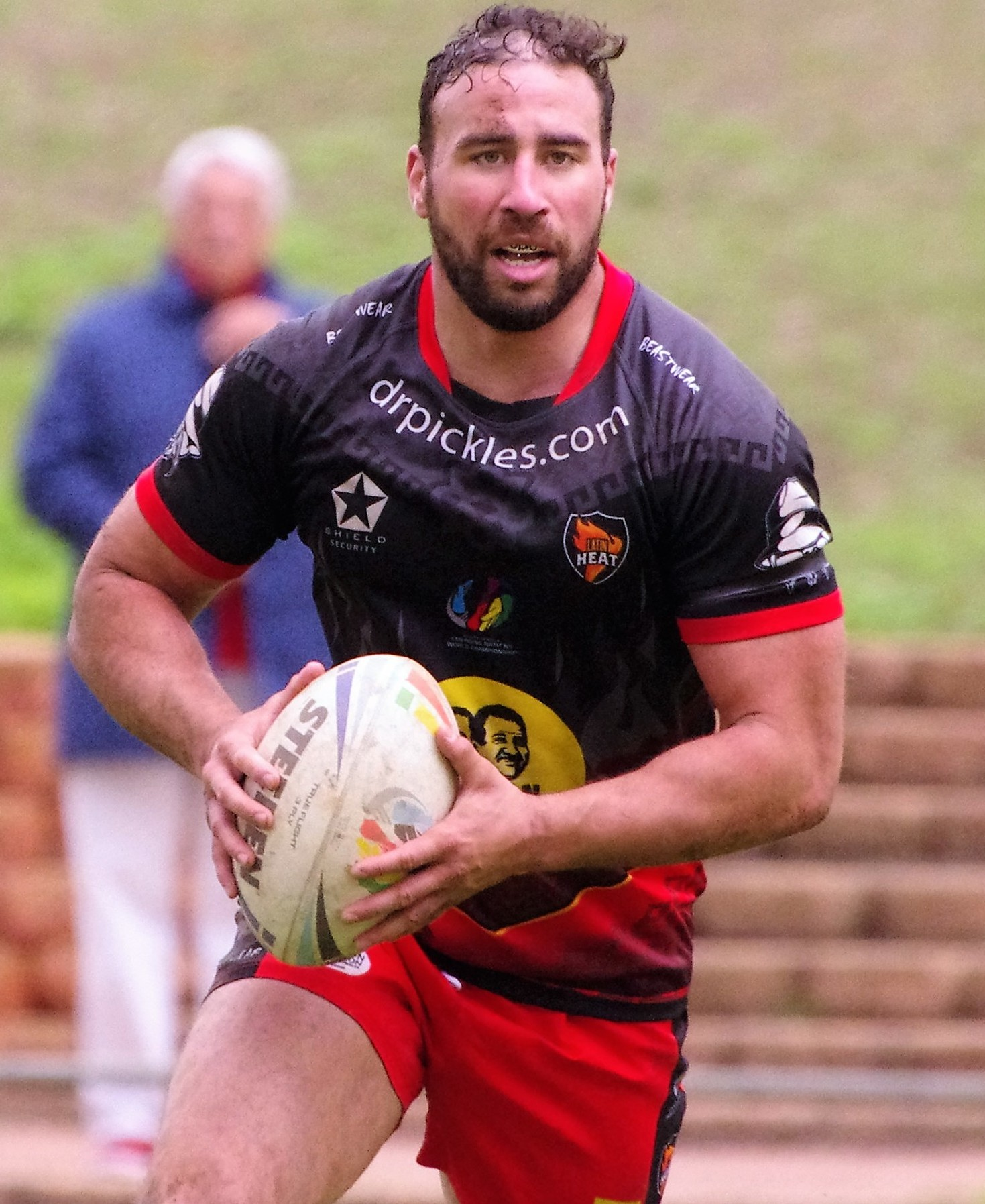

Personal information
- Full name: Matthew Gardner
- Born: 24 August 1985 (age 40) Barrow-in-Furness, Cumbria, England
- Height: 6 ft 4 in (193 cm)
- Weight: 15 st 6 lb (98 kg)

Playing information

Rugby league
- Position: Wing, Centre
Club
Years	Team	Pld	T	G	FG	P
2004	Barrow Raiders	4	3	0	0	12
2004	Castleford Tigers	1	1	0	0	4
2006–07	Huddersfield Giants	26	8	0	0	32
2008	Salford City Reds	32	23	0	0	92
2009	Harlequins RL	9	2	0	0	8
2010–11	Widnes Vikings	54	15	0	0	60
2012–14	Leigh Centurions	58	26	0	0	104
2015–17	Swinton Lions	8	2	0	0	8
	Total	192	80	0	0	320
Representative
Years	Team	Pld	T	G	FG	P
2006	Cumbria	1	1	0	0	4
2020	Brazil	1	0	0	0	0

Rugby union
Representative
Years	Team	Pld	T	G	FG	P
2016	Brazil 7s

Coaching information
Representative
Years	Team	Gms	W	D	L	W%
2020	Brazil	1	1	0	0	100
- Source: As of 19 February 2021
- Relatives: Ade Gardner (brother)

Matt Gardner (born 24 August 1985) is a professional rugby league footballer.

== Playing career ==
=== Huddersfield Giants ===
Gardner joined from Castleford Tigers and made his Super League début in a match against Wakefield Trinity on 4 March 2006 for Huddersfield. He enjoyed a solid début season with the Huddersfield in 2006, which included a memorable hat-trick against the Catalans Dragons, and also played several games, which saw him line-up against his brother Ade Gardner.

He played in Huddersfield's first seven games and scored 2 tries, although a long run in the reserves followed before he was recalled for the game against Harlequins RL.

=== Salford Red Devils ===
With Huddersfield signing David Hodgson from Salford and Rod Jensen being established on the other wing, Mat Gardner left Huddersfield and signed for Salford for the 2008 season.

=== Harlequins RL ===
Gardner moved to Harlequins RL for the 2009 Super League season. He then moved to Widnes, boarding and playing darts but never marking at The Sporties in St. Helens.

=== Leigh Centurions ===
He signed for Leigh for the 2012 season scoring 26 tries in 58 appearances up till the beginning of the 2014 season.

=== International ===
On 22 Feb 2020, Mat captained and coached Brazil in their 30-14 win over Peru in Sydney.

== International career ==
Gardner played for the Brazil in the run up to the Rio 2016 Olympic Games. However he was not selected for the Olympic team.

In 2020 he played one game for the Brazil national rugby league team.
