= David Allen (rugby league) =

Ireland international rugby league footballer

Dave Allen
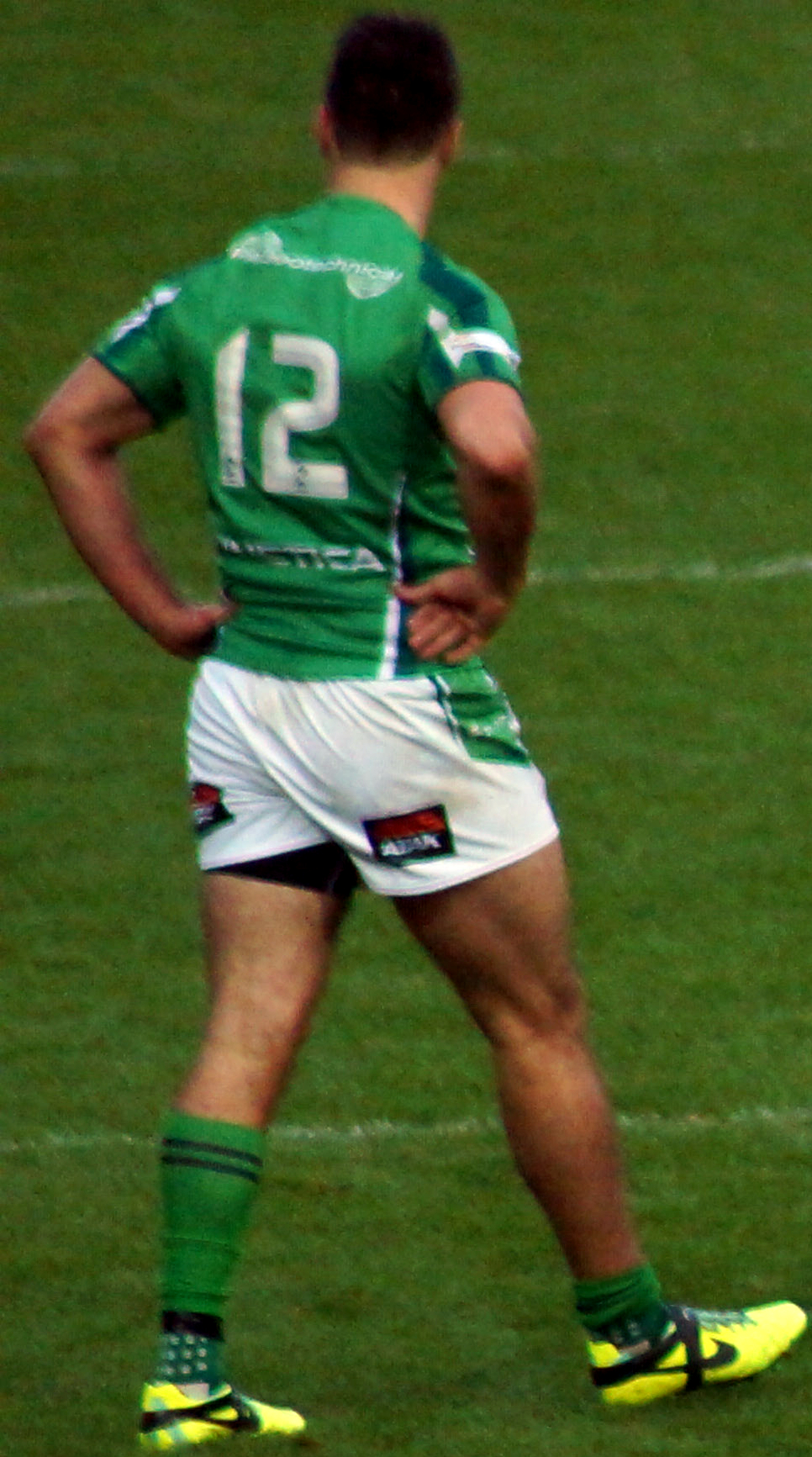

Personal information
- Full name: David Allen
- Born: 15 September 1985 (age 40) Wigan, Greater Manchester, England

Playing information
- Position: Second-row, Loose forward
Club
Years	Team	Pld	T	G	FG	P
2003–05	Wigan Warriors	25	4	0	0	16
2006	Widnes Vikings	25	10	0	0	40
2009	Oldham	17	6	0	0	24
2009	Barrow Raiders	8	1	0	0	4
2010–14	Widnes Vikings	109	24	0	0	96
2015–17	Whitehaven	51	8	0	0	32
2018	Rochdale Hornets	13	0	0	0	0
	Total	248	53	0	0	212
Representative
Years	Team	Pld	T	G	FG	P
2006–16	Ireland	10	1	0	0	4

David Allen (born 15 September 1985) is a former rugby league footballer who played as a second-row forward. An Ireland international, Allen played for the Wigan Warriors, Oldham, Barrow Raiders, Widnes Vikings, Whitehaven and the Rochdale Hornets.

== Club career ==
Allen was included in the Wigan Warriors squad in 2003 and become a first team player in 2005. He played 25 matches for Wigan mostly as a substitute and was released at the end of the 2005's Super League X.

After being released from Wigan Warriors he went on to join National League One side Widnes Vikings. He was one of seven ex-Wigan players in the 2006 Widnes side and regularly played in the second row. He played in the 2006 National League One Grand Final where Widnes lost 16–29 to Hull Kingston Rovers. At the end of 2006 his contract with Widnes was not renewed after he failed a drug test following the Grand Final game against the Hull KR. Allen was banned from rugby league for 12 months by the Rugby Football League after testing positive for a metabolite of cocaine, doubled to two years following an appeal by UK Sport.

After serving his ban, he joined Oldham ahead of the 2009 season. After a brief spell with Barrow Raiders, Allen joined Widnes for the second time in 2010 and was made club captain. He made 26 appearances in the 2012 season and, in October, signed a new contract until the end of the 2014 season. He was released at the end of the 2014 season, and was signed by Whitehaven. Injury prevented him from playing during 2017 and he signed for Rochdale Hornets at the end of the season.

== International career ==
He was included in the 2003 England Academy squad to face the Australian Institute of Sport. He was selected for the 2004 Academy Origin Series and the 2004 England Academy U-18s tour. In 2006 he was selected for Ireland along with six other Widnes players for the country's World Cup qualifying matches.

In 2016, he was called up to the Ireland squad for the 2017 Rugby League World Cup European Pool B qualifiers.

== Trivia ==
- Allen's father, John, was a professional player with Swinton.
- He attended Fairfield High School in Widnes from 1997 to 2002.
