= Ben Davies (rugby league, born 1989) =

English professional rugby league footballer

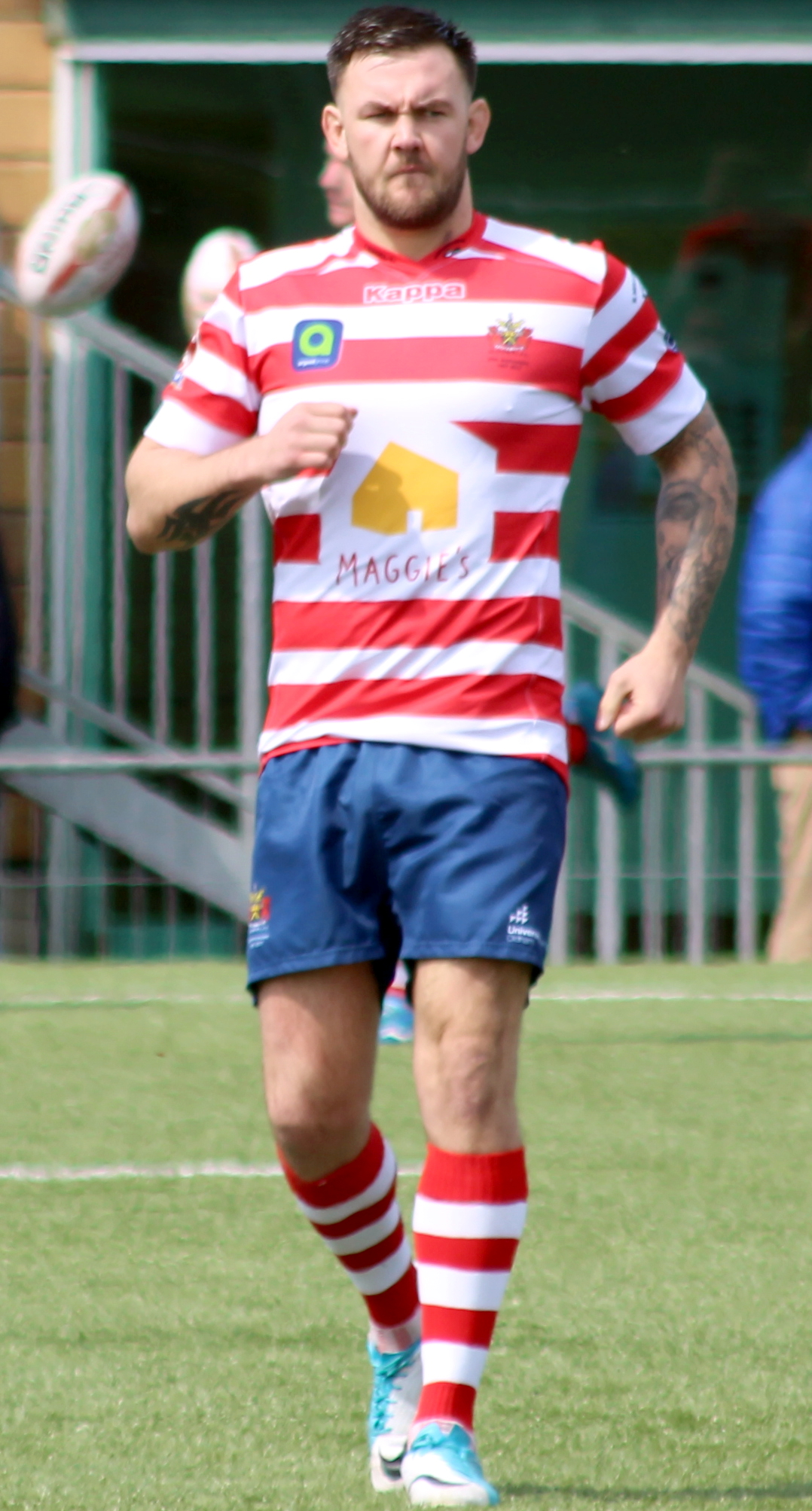

Personal information
- Full name: Benjamin Davies
- Born: 2 November 1989 (age 35) Wigan, Greater Manchester, England
- Height: 6 ft 1 in (1.85 m)
- Weight: 14 st 13 lb (95 kg)

Playing information
- Position: Prop
Club
| Years | Team | Pld | T | G | FG | P |
|---|---|---|---|---|---|---|
| 2010–11 | Wigan Warriors | 5 | 0 | 0 | 0 | 0 |
| 2010(loan) | → Widnes Vikings | 17 | 3 | 0 | 0 | 12 |
| 2011(loan) | → Barrow Raiders | 10 | 0 | 0 | 0 | 0 |
| 2011 | Castleford Tigers | 7 | 2 | 0 | 0 | 8 |
| 2012–13 | Widnes Vikings | 25 | 3 | 0 | 0 | 12 |
| 2013(loan) | → Workington Town | 1 | 0 | 0 | 0 | 0 |
| 2013(loan) | → South Wales Scorpions | 3 | 0 | 0 | 0 | 0 |
| 2013 | Castleford Tigers | 2 | 0 | 0 | 0 | 0 |
| 2013–14 | Halifax | 18 | 2 | 0 | 0 | 8 |
| 2014 | Barrow Raiders | 12 | 3 | 0 | 0 | 12 |
| 2015–16 | Whitehaven | 56 | 5 | 0 | 0 | 20 |
| 2017–20 | Oldham | 48 | 2 | 0 | 0 | 8 |
| | Total | 204 | 20 | 0 | 0 | 80 |
- Source: As of 15 January 2018

Benjamin (Ben) "Danger" Davies (born 2 November 1989) is a professional rugby league footballer who last played as a prop for Oldham in Kingstone Press League 1. He has previously played for:-

- Wigan Warriors
- Widnes Vikings
- Workington Town
- South Wales Scorpions
- Barrow Raiders
- Castleford Tigers
- Halifax RLFC
- Whitehaven RLFC

== Background ==
Wigan, Greater Manchester, England.

== Career ==
He signed for the Wigan Warriors from local amateur team Leigh East.

He has junior representative honours with Lancashire (at under 14s and 15s level) and England (under 15s and 18s.) At the start of 2010, he was sent out on loan to Widnes. After impressing on his one-month loan, he was dual registered with the Chemics. He made his Super League début off the bench against Crusaders on 22 May 2010. Ben has previously played for Halifax.
