= Stefan Marsh =

English rugby league footballer

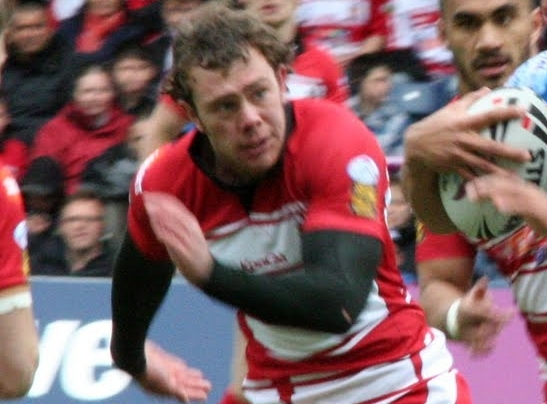

Personal information
- Born: 3 September 1990 (age 36) Wigan, Greater Manchester, England
- Height: 5 ft 11 in (1.80 m)
- Weight: 13 st 12 lb (88 kg)

Playing information
- Position: Centre, Wing
Club
Years	Team	Pld	T	G	FG	P
2010–12	Wigan Warriors	12	3	0	0	12
2010(loan)	→ Widnes Vikings	3	3	0	0	12
2010(loan)	→ Whitehaven	1	0	0	0	0
2012(loan)	→ Widnes Vikings	20	7	0	0	28
2013–18	Widnes Vikings	120	58	21	0	276
2019	Leigh Centurions	8	3	0	0	12
	Total	164	74	21	0	340
- Source: As of 2 December 2018

Stefan Marsh is an English professional rugby league footballer who last played as a centre or winger for the Leigh Centurions in the Championship. He previously played for the Wigan Warriors before being released at the end of the 2012 Super League season, which he spent on loan at Widnes.

== Background ==
Marsh was born in Wigan, Greater Manchester, England.

== Career ==
=== Wigan ===
Marsh was signed by the Wigan Warriors in 2007 from amateur side Wigan St Patricks. He made his first-grade début at the 2010 Magic Weekend at Murrayfield in a 28–10 win over Huddersfield.

=== Widnes ===
Marsh spent the 2012 season on loan at Super League club Widnes, developing into a specialist centre. After being released by Wigan at the end of the season, he rejoined Widnes on a permanent deal, signing a two-year contract.
