= Kurt Haggerty =

Ireland international rugby league footballer and coach

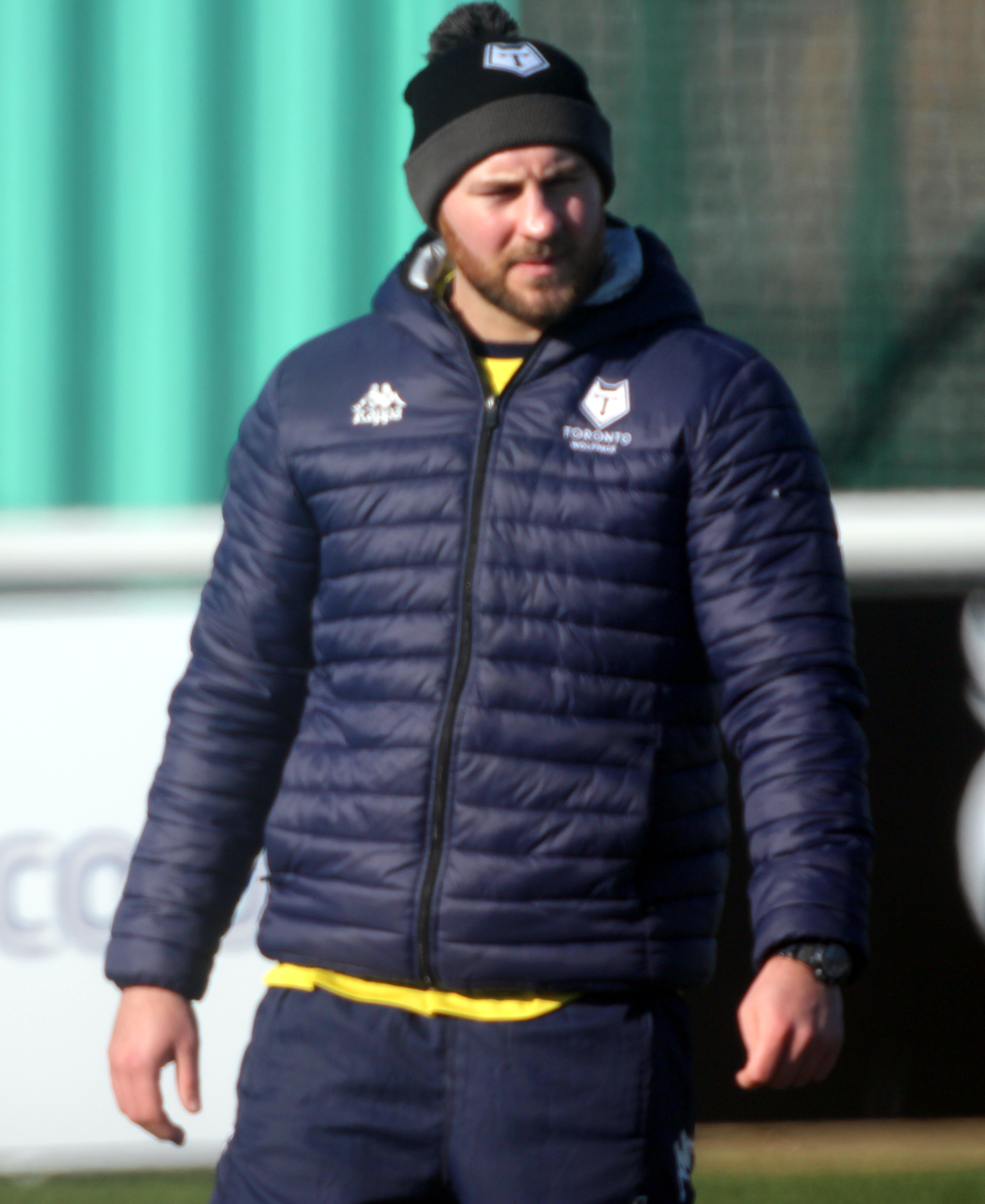

Personal information
- Full name: Kurt Derek Haggerty
- Born: 8 January 1989 (age 37) St Helens, Merseyside, England

Playing information
- Position: Second-row, Loose forward
Club
Years	Team	Pld	T	G	FG	P
2009	Leigh Centurions	9	3	0	0	12
2010	Blackpool Panthers	18	5	0	0	20
2010–12	Widnes Vikings	41	8	9	0	50
2013	Barrow Raiders	26	9	58	0	152
2014–15	Leigh Centurions	44	10	1	1	43
2016	Bradford Bulls	25	5	2	1	25
	Total	163	40	70	2	302
Representative
Years	Team	Pld	T	G	FG	P
2012–13	Ireland	2	0	0	0	0

Coaching information
Club
Years	Team	Gms	W	D	L	W%
2013–16	Pilkington Recs	101	73	4	24	72
2021	Leigh Centurions	3	0	0	3	0
2026–	Bradford Bulls	29	8	0	21	28
	Total	133	81	4	48	61
- Source: As of 3 November 2026
- Father: Roy Haggerty
- Relatives: Gareth Haggerty (brother)

Kurt Haggerty (born 8 January 1989) is a professional rugby league coach who is the head coach of the Bradford Bulls in the Super League. He played in the 2000s and 2010s as a second-row and loose forward.

As a player, he played for the Bradford Bulls, Leigh Centurions, Widnes Vikings and the Barrow Raiders at club level and Ireland at international level, and was part of the Ireland squad at the 2013 Rugby League World Cup.

== Background ==
He is the son of former St Helens player Roy Haggerty.

== Playing career ==
Haggerty began his career at the Leigh Centurions and played in the Championship for the Leigh Centurions, Widnes Vikings, Barrow Raiders and the Bradford Bulls. He played one season in the Super League with the Widnes Vikings, making 14 appearances.

He made his début for Ireland in 2012 and was a member of the squad for the 2013 Rugby League World Cup, making one appearance from the bench at the tournament in their defeat by Fiji.

At the end of the 2016 season Haggerty retired from playing at the age of 27 in order to take up a coaching role with Toronto Wolfpack.

== Coaching career ==
=== Pilkington Recs ===
In 2013 whilst a player for the Barrow Raiders, Haggerty was appointed head coach of leading amateur club, Pilkington Recs competing in the National Conference League in Division 3. In 2013 he led the team to promotion to Division 2. In 2014 he repeated this success with promotion to Division 1. On 17 October 2015, the team secured their 3rd consecutive promotion, to move into the Premier Division in 2016. In February 2016 he guided the team to their first ever Challenge Cup win over professional opposition, beating London Skolars 13-0 in the Third Round. Haggerty was appointed assistant coach of the Toronto Wolfpack for their inaugural season in 2016.

=== Leigh Centurions ===
On 2 June 2021, assistant coach Haggerty was made interim head coach of the Leigh Centurions after John Duffy left by mutual consent. Leigh had lost their opening eight matches at the time of his appointment.

On 23 August 2021, Leigh recorded their first victory under Haggerty in the 2021 Super League season after losing the previous 16 matches in the competition beating Salford 32-22. Despite that, they were already relegated from Super League. Leigh finished the season with only two wins from 22 matches.

=== Bradford Bulls ===
On 17 September 2025 it was reported that he had taken the role of head-coach for Bradford Bulls on a 3-year deal
