= Alex Gerrard (rugby league) =

English rugby league footballer

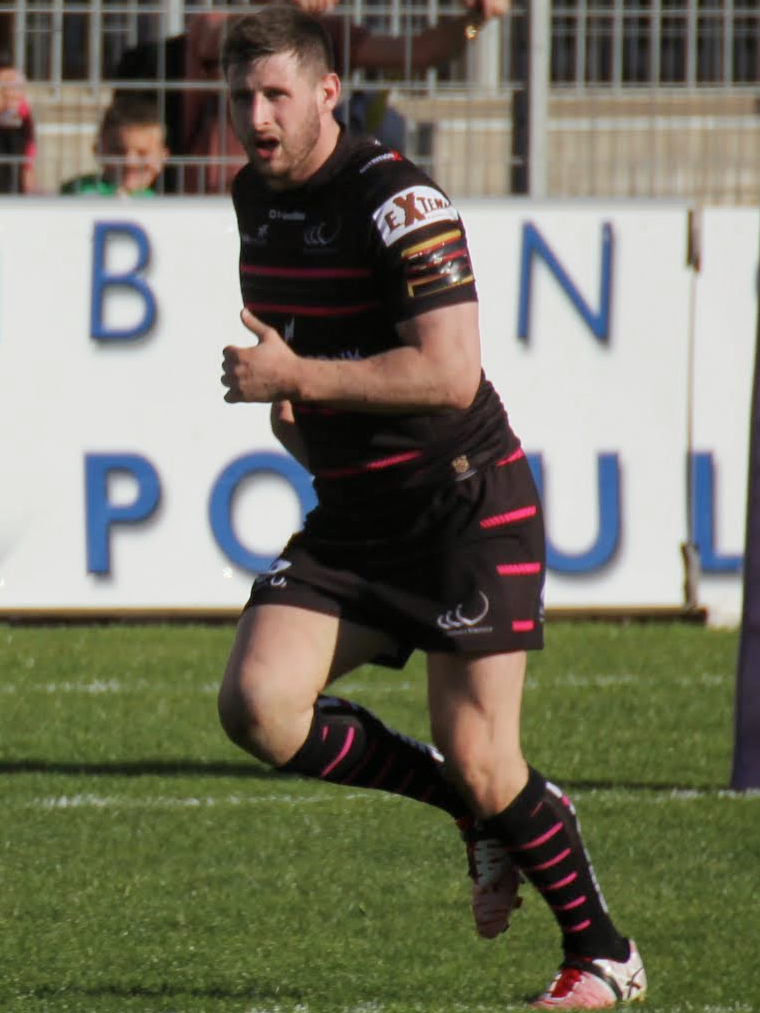

Personal information
- Full name: Alexander Dean Gerrard
- Born: 5 November 1991 (age 35) Lowton, Greater Manchester, England
- Height: 6 ft 1 in (1.85 m)
- Weight: 16 st 7 lb (105 kg)

Playing information
- Position: Prop, Loose forward
Club
Years	Team	Pld	T	G	FG	P
2010–18	Widnes Vikings	115	8	0	0	32
2018(loan)	→ N Wales Crusaders	1	0	0	0	0
2020–21	Leigh Centurions	19	1	0	0	4
2022–23	Salford Red Devils	31	3	0	0	12
	Total	166	12	0	0	48
- Source: As of 3 February 2024

Alex Gerrard (born 5 November 1991) is an English rugby league footballer who last played as a prop and loose forward for the Salford Red Devils in the Super League.

He has previously played for the Widnes Vikings in the Championship and Super League, and on loan from Widnes at the North Wales Crusaders in League 1. Gerrard has also played for the Mackay Cutters in the Queensland Cup.

He made his début for the first team in the 2010 Challenge Cup 5th round tie against the Wigan Warriors.

Salford Red Devils confirmed on 3 Feb 24 that he had left the club.
