= Ben Kavanagh =

Scotland international rugby league footballer

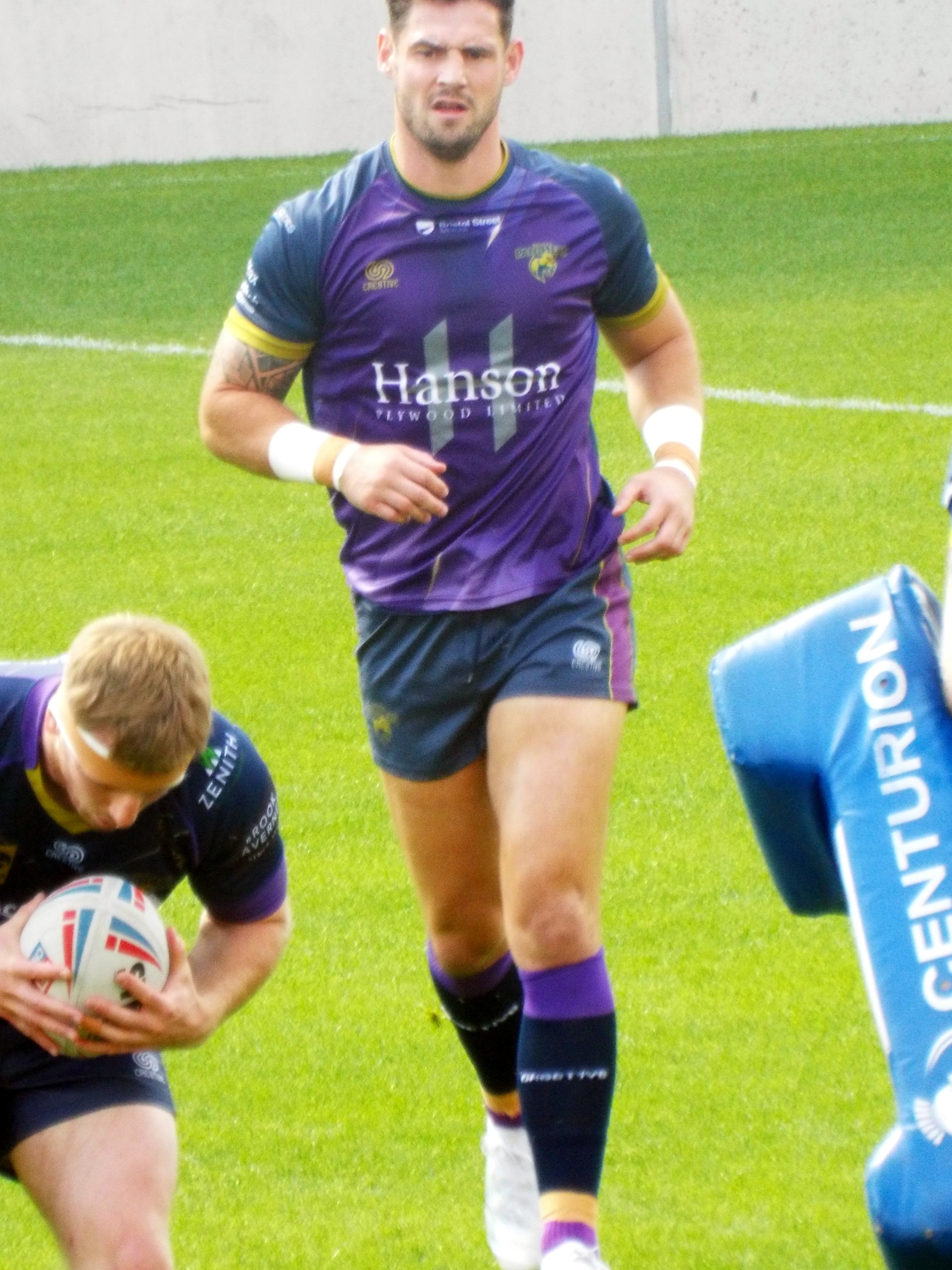

Personal information
- Born: 4 March 1988 (age 38) Halifax, West Yorkshire, England
- Height: 6 ft 2 in (188 cm)
- Weight: 17 st 7 lb (111 kg)

Playing information
- Position: Prop
Club
Years	Team	Pld	T	G	FG	P
2008–15	Widnes Vikings	180	19	0	0	68
2015(loan)	→ Wakefield Trinity Wildcats	15	0	0	0	0
2016	Bradford Bulls	17	1	0	0	4
2017–18	Hull Kingston Rovers	54	3	0	0	12
2019–24	Halifax Panthers	104	22	0	0	88
	Total	370	45	0	0	172
Representative
Years	Team	Pld	T	G	FG	P
2013–	Scotland	21	7	0	0	12
- Source: As of 20 November 2026

Ben Kavanagh (born 4 March 1988) is a Scotland former international rugby league footballer who last played as a prop for Halifax in the Championship.

== Background ==
Kavanagh was born in Halifax, West Yorkshire, England.

== Career ==
Kavanagh initially joined Widnes on loan from Wigan in 2008. He scored two tries in 21 appearances for the Widnes club, and joined the club permanently at the end of the season, signing a three-year contract.

He went on to make 72 consecutive appearances for the club, and was the first player to be given a Super League contract by Widnes when they were granted a licence for the 2012 season.

Kavanagh is a Scotland international, and was named in their squad for the 2013 Rugby League World Cup as a replacement for the injured Keith Galloway.

On 7 May 2014, Kavanagh committed to playing for Widnes for two more years.

In October and November 2014, Kavanagh played in the 2014 European Cup competition. He played in all of Scotland's games and scored a try in their fixture against France.

In October and November 2015, Kavanagh played in the 2015 European Cup competition.

Kavanagh signed a two-year Deal with the Bradford Bulls following the 2015 season. Kavanagh featured in the pre-season friendlies against Leeds Rhinos and Castleford Tigers.

In January 2017, it was revealed that Kavanagh had signed a two-year deal to play for Hull Kingston Rovers.

In 2019, he joined Halifax. In September 2020, he signed a one-year contract extension with Halifax.

On 15 November 2024 he announced his retirement
