= Grant Gore =

English rugby league player

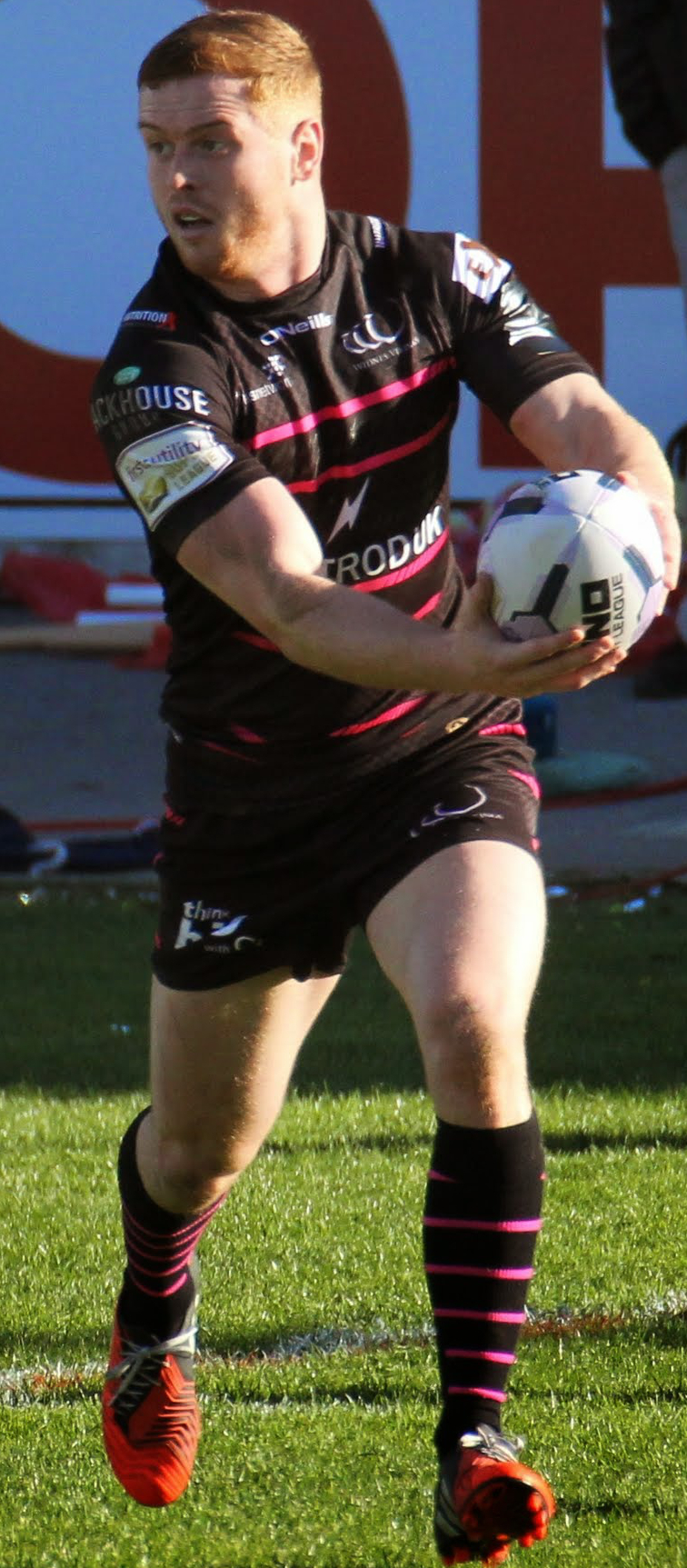

Personal information
- Born: 21 November 1991 (age 34)

Playing information
- Position: Stand-off, Scrum-half
Club
Years	Team	Pld	T	G	FG	P
2011–15	Widnes Vikings	23	3	0	0	12
2015–16	Whitehaven	53	14	7	2	72
2017	Swinton Lions	16	3	0	0	12
	Total	92	20	7	2	96
- Source: As of 1 May 2017

Grant Gore (born 21 November 1991) is a rugby league footballer who last played for the Swinton Lions in the Championship.

He started his career at Widnes, and made his début in 2011 in a Northern Rail Cup match against London Skolars.

He has previously played for Whitehaven.
