= Steve Pickersgill =

English rugby league footballer

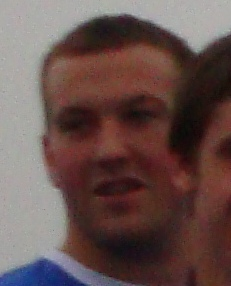

Personal information
- Full name: Steven Pickersgill
- Born: 28 November 1985 (age 39) Warrington, England

Playing information
- Height: 6 ft 2 in (1.88 m)
- Weight: 15 st 10 lb (100 kg)
- Position: Prop, Second-row
Club
Years	Team	Pld	T	G	FG	P
2005–10	Warrington Wolves	36	1	0	0	4
2009(loan)	→ Widnes Vikings	11	1	0	0	4
2010–14	Widnes Vikings	69	5	0	0	10
	Total	116	7	0	0	18

Steve Pickersgill (born 28 November 1985) is an English former professional rugby league footballer who played in the 2000s and 2010s. He played at representative level for England (Academy), and at club level for Crosfields ARLFC (in Warrington), and in the Super League for the Warrington Wolves, and the Widnes Vikings, as a prop, or second-row.

== Background ==
Steve Pickersgill was born in Warrington, Cheshire, England, he is the son of the rugby league second-row who played in the 1970s for Woolston Rovers ARLFC (in Warrington), and Warrington; Roy Pickersgill.

== Career ==
Steve Pickersgill made his début for Warrington Wolves on Friday 11 March 2005, and he played his last match for Warrington Wolves during 2010's Super League XV, he made his début for Widnes Vikings against Gateshead Thunder at Select Security Stadium, Widnes on Saturday 23 May 2009, due to injuries, he retired from rugby league aged 28 during 2014's Super League XIX.
