= Paddy Flynn =

English rugby league footballer

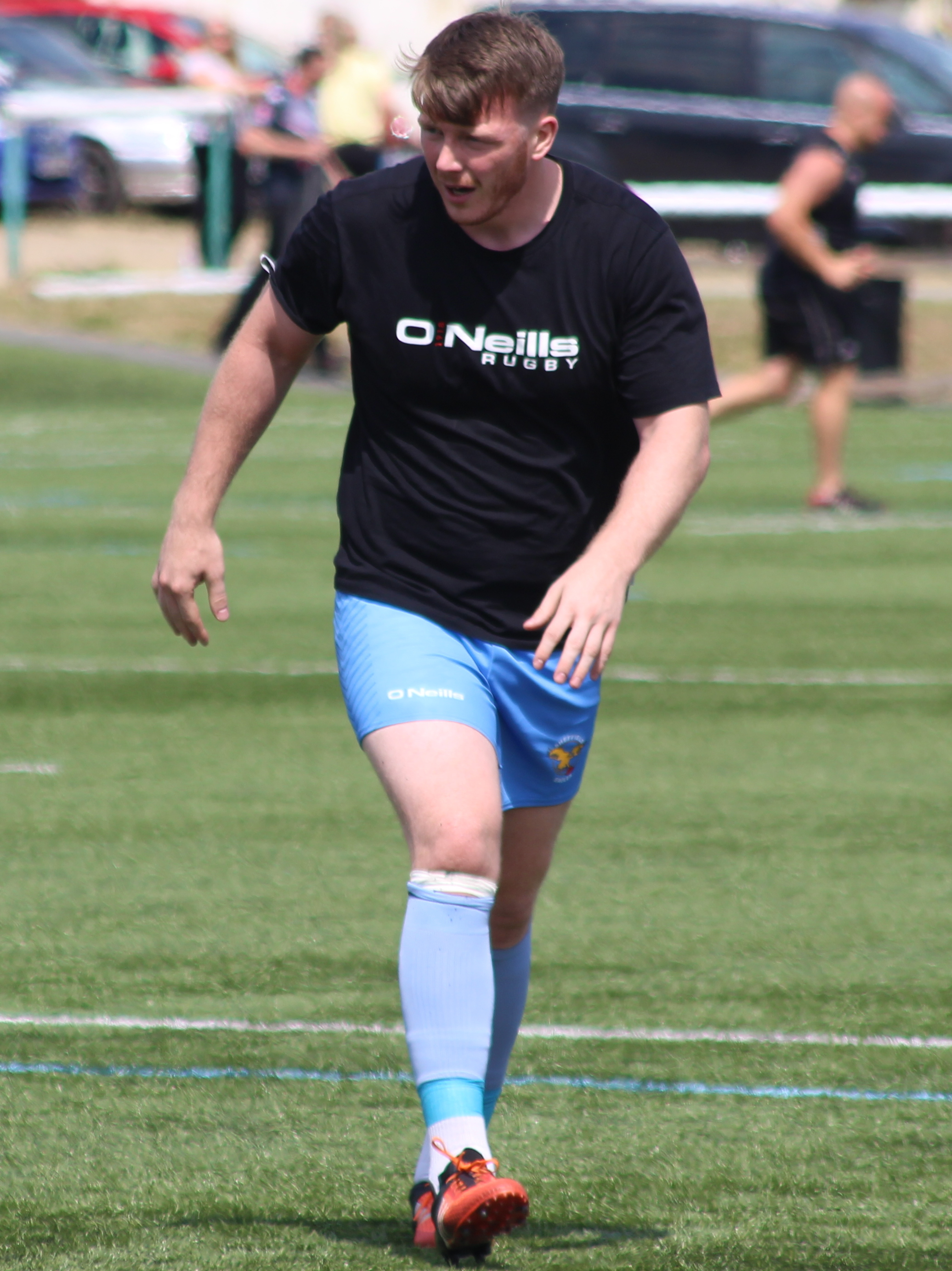

Personal information
- Born: 11 December 1987 (age 38) St Helens, Merseyside, England

Playing information
- Height: 6 ft 1 in (1.85 m)
- Weight: 14 st 11 lb (94 kg)
- Position: Wing
Club
Years	Team	Pld	T	G	FG	P
2008–16	Widnes Vikings	177	102	0	0	408
2016(loan)	→ Castleford Tigers	10	6	0	0	24
2017	Sheffield Eagles	17	7	0	0	28
2019	Rochdale Hornets	2	0	0	0	0
	Total	206	115	0	0	460

Paddy Flynn (born 11 December 1987) is a former professional rugby league footballer who played as a winger. He played for the Widnes Vikings, and on loan from Widnes at the Castleford Tigers in the Super League. Flynn also played for the Sheffield Eagles and the Rochdale Hornets in the Championship.

Flynn has appeared Outside of sport, Flynn also works part-time as a plumber. His hobbies include playing Clash of Clans, where he represents Yorkshire based CGDL.

== Background ==
Flynn was born in St Helens, Merseyside, England.

== Club career ==
Flynn made his début for Widnes, scoring two tries against Barrow at Craven Park on Sunday 16 March 2008. Flynn scored his 100th Widnes try against the Wakefield Trinity Wildcats on 12 September 2015.

In May 2016 Paddy joined the Castleford Tigers on loan for the rest of the 2016 season.

At the beginning of May 2017, Championship side the Sheffield Eagles signed Flynn until the end of the season. He scored a try on his first appearance in the Championship for the Eagles in a 45-20 defeat at the hands of French side Toulouse Olympique.

In November 2018, Flynn signed for Rochdale Hornets in the Championship.
