= Macgraff Leuluai =

Samoan/English professional rugby league footballer

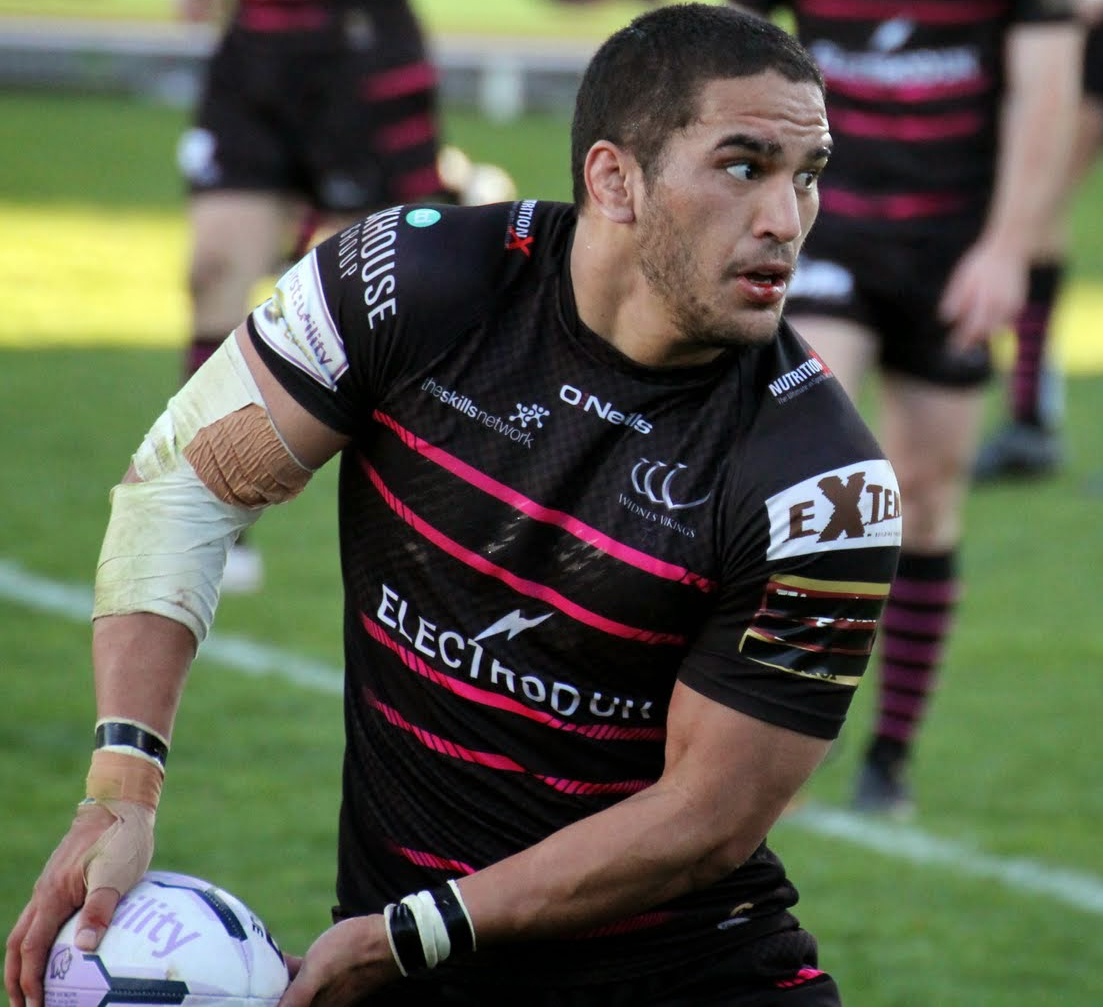

Personal information
- Full name: Macgraff David E Leuluai
- Born: 9 February 1990 (age 36) Wakefield, West Riding of Yorkshire, England
- Height: 6 ft 0 in (1.82 m)
- Weight: 15 st 4 lb (97 kg)

Playing information
- Position: Second-row, Loose forward
Club
Years	Team	Pld	T	G	FG	P
2009–10	Leigh Centurions	38	6	0	0	24
2011–20	Widnes Vikings	196	15	0	0	60
2012(loan)	→ Leigh Centurions	2	0	0	0	0
2013(loan)	→ Workington Town	1	0	0	0	0
2014(loan)	→ Whitehaven	2	0	0	0	0
2018(loan)	→ N Wales Crusaders	1	0	0	0	0
2021–2023	Otara Scorpions
	Total	240	21	0	0	84
Representative
Years	Team	Pld	T	G	FG	P
2022	Counties-Manukau Stingrays	2	0	0	0	0
- Source: As of 21 December 2020
- Father: James Leuluai
- Relatives: Phillip Leuluai (uncle); Thomas Leuluai (brother); Kylie Leuluai (cousin); Marley Leuluai (cousin)

Macgraff David E. Leuluai (born 9 February 1990) is a rugby league footballer who plays as a second-row or loose forward.

== Background ==
He was born in Wakefield, West Yorkshire, England.

His father, James, and his brother, Thomas, have both represented New Zealand and he is part of a wider Leuluai family that includes Phillip and Kyle.

== Playing career ==
Born in Wakefield while his father was playing for Wakefield Trinity, Leuluai was a Newcastle Knights junior before joining Leigh Centurions as an 18-year-old in 2009. As he was born in Wakefield, Leuluai does not require a work permit to play in England and does not count on the overseas quota.

Leuluai joined Widnes in 2011 on a one-year contract. This was later extended to a Super League deal ending in 2013.

On 19 August 2020 it was announced that Leuluai would leave Widnes at the end of the 2020 season
