= 2015 Widnes Vikings season =

- Super League XX Rank: 9th
- Play-off result: 2nd
- Challenge Cup: Quarter-final
- 2015 record: Wins: 15; draws: 1; losses: 16
- Points scored: For: 796; against: 681

Team information
- Chairman: Steve O'Connor
- Head Coach: Denis Betts
- Captain: Kevin Brown
- Stadium: Halton Stadium

Top scorers
- Tries: Kevin Brown - 20
- Goals: Jack Owens - 46
- Points: Jack Owens - 128
← 2014	List of seasons	2016 →

This article details the Widnes Vikings rugby league football club's 2015 season. This was the Vikings' 4th consecutive season back in the Super League.

== Pre season friendlies ==
LEGEND
Win
Draw
Loss

Widnes score is first.

Date	Competition	Vrs	H/A	Venue	Result	Score	Tries	Goals	Att
7/1/15	Pre Season	Warrington	A	Halliwell Jones Stadium	L	0-16	-	-	-
18/1/15	Pre Season	St. Helens	A	Langtree Park	W	20-16	Flynn, Ah Van, Hulme (2)	Tickle 0/2, Craven 2/2	-
25/1/15	Pre Season	Castleford	A	The Jungle	L	18-20	Flynn (2), Hanbury, Brown	Tickle 1/2, Marsh 0/2	2,141

== Table ==
Super League Table

Pos	Team	Pld	W	D	L	PF	PA	PD	Pts	Qualification
1	Leeds Rhinos	23	16	1	6	758	477	+281	33	Super League Super 8s
2	St Helens	23	16	0	7	598	436	+162	32	Super League Super 8s
3	Wigan Warriors	23	15	1	7	589	413	+176	31	Super League Super 8s
4	Huddersfield Giants	23	13	2	8	538	394	+144	28	Super League Super 8s
5	Castleford Tigers	23	13	0	10	547	505	+42	26	Super League Super 8s
6	Warrington Wolves	23	12	0	11	552	456	+96	24	Super League Super 8s
7	Hull F.C.	23	11	0	12	452	484	−32	22	Super League Super 8s
8	Catalans Dragons	23	9	2	12	561	574	−13	20	Super League Super 8s
9	Widnes Vikings	23	9	1	13	518	565	−47	19	The Qualifiers
10	Hull Kingston Rovers	23	9	0	14	534	646	−112	18	The Qualifiers
11	Salford Red Devils	23	8	1	14	447	617	−170	17	The Qualifiers
12	Wakefield Trinity Wildcats	23	3	0	20	402	929	−527	6	The Qualifiers

Source: Rugby League Project
Rules for classification: 1) Points; 2) Points difference; 3) Number of points scored;

Super 8 Qualifier's Table

Pos	Team	Pld	W	D	L	PF	PA	PD	Pts	Qualification
1	Hull Kingston Rovers	7	7	0	0	234	118	+116	14	2016 Super League
2	Widnes Vikings	7	5	0	2	232	70	+162	10	2016 Super League
3	Salford Red Devils	7	5	0	2	239	203	+36	10	2016 Super League
4	Wakefield Trinity Wildcats (W)	7	3	0	4	153	170	−17	6	Million Pound Game
5	Bradford Bulls	7	3	0	4	167	240	−73	6	Million Pound Game
6	Halifax	7	2	0	5	162	186	−24	4	2016 Championship
7	Sheffield Eagles	7	2	0	5	152	267	−115	4	2016 Championship
8	Leigh Centurions	7	1	0	6	146	231	−85	2	2016 Championship

Source: Rugby League Project
Rules for classification: 1) Points; 2) Points difference; 3) Number of points scored;
(W) Million Pound Game Winner

== 2015 fixtures and results ==
LEGEND
Win
Draw
Loss

2015 Super League Fixtures

Date	Competition	Rnd	Vrs	H/A	Venue	Result	Score	Tries	Goals	Att	Live on TV
5/2/15	Super League XX	1	Wigan	H	Select Security Stadium	D	22-22	Mellor, Hanbury, Phelps, Dean	Tickle 2/2, Marsh 1/2	9,286	Sky Sports
13/2/15	Super League XX	2	Leeds	A	Headingley Stadium	L	6-38	Manuokafoa	Tickle 1/1	14,132	-
1/3/15	Super League XX	3	Wakefield Trinity	H	Select Security Stadium	W	58-16	Mellor, Brown (2), White (4), Ah Van (2), Clarkson	Tickle 5/6, White 4/4	5,810	-
6/3/15	Super League XX	4	Huddersfield	A	Galpharm Stadium	L	12-24	Mellor, Manuokafoa	Tickle 2/2	5,452	-
13/3/15	Super League XX	5	St. Helens	H	Select Security Stadium	L	20-30	O'Carroll, Ah Van, Heremaia	Tickle 1/1, Marsh 3/3	7,772	-
22/3/15	Super League XX	6	Hull Kingston Rovers	H	Select Security Stadium	W	20-16	Flynn (2), Galea	Owens 4/4	5,273	-
26/3/15	Super League XX	7	Salford	A	AJ Bell Stadium	L	8-36	Flynn	Owens 2/2	3,476	Sky Sports
2/4/15	Super League XX	8	Warrington	H	Select Security Stadium	W	30-10	Phelps, Marsh (2), White, Brown, Owens	Owens 3/6	7,768	-
6/4/15	Super League XX	9	Catalans Dragons	A	Stade Gilbert Brutus	L	16-32	Owens, Marsh, Gerrard	Owens 2/3	7,000	Sky Sports
10/4/15	Super League XX	10	Hull F.C.	A	KC Stadium	L	8-22	Brown, Ah Van	Owens 0/2	9,295	Sky Sports
19/4/15	Super League XX	11	Castleford	H	Select Security Stadium	W	46-16	Ah Van (2), Hanbury (2), Owens, Marsh, Brown, Phelps	Owens 7/8	5,257	-
24/4/15	Super League XX	12	St. Helens	A	Langtree Park	L	16-34	Brown, Mellor, Whitley	Owens 2/3	11,271	-
3/5/15	Super League XX	13	Warrington	A	Halliwell Jones Stadium	L	20-22	Owens, Flynn, Brown (2)	Owens 2/4	10,856	-
10/5/15	Super League XX	14	Leeds	H	Select Security Stadium	W	38-24	Clarkson, Marsh, Mellor, Galea, Manuokafoa, Dean, Heremaia	Owens 5/7	6,113	-
24/5/15	Super League XX	15	Wakefield Trinity	A	Belle Vue	W	30-18	Hanbury, Marsh (3), Owens, White	Owens 0/3, White 3/3	3,132	-
30/5/15	Magic Weekend	16	Salford	N	St James' Park	W	38-16	Ah Van (2), Galea, Brown (3), Marsh	Owens 5/7	40,871	Sky Sports
4/6/15	Super League XX	17	Hull F.C.	H	Select Security Stadium	L	12-25	Owens, Whitley	Owens 2/2	5,573	Sky Sports
14/6/15	Super League XX	18	Hull Kingston Rovers	A	Craven Park	L	16-38	Marsh, Brown, Dean	Owens 2/3	6,982	-
21/6/15	Super League XX	19	Huddersfield	H	Select Security Stadium	L	22-30	Ah Van, Owens, Brown (2)	Owens 3/4	5,420	-
5/7/15	Super League XX	20	Castleford	A	The Jungle	L	20-34	Owens, Clarkson, Gilmore, Leuluai	Owens 2/4	7,002	-
12/7/15	Super League XX	21	Catalans Dragons	H	Select Security Stadium	W	29-22	Ah Van (2), Gilmore, Flynn (2)	Marsh 3/3, Gilmore 1/3, Gilmore 1 DG	4,822	-
17/7/15	Super League XX	22	Wigan	A	DW Stadium	L	10-20	Gilmore, Dean	Gilmore 1/1	13,194	-
26/7/15	Super League XX	23	Salford	H	Select Security Stadium	W	21-20	Clarkson, Flynn, Marsh, Heremaia	Marsh 2/4, Craven 1 DG	5,479	-

2015 Super 8 Qualifiers

Date	Competition	Rnd	Vrs	H/A	Venue	Result	Score	Tries	Goals	Att	Live on TV
9/8/15	Championship	S1	Halifax	A	Shay Stadium	W	14-0	Runciman (2), Gerrard	White 1/3	3,022	-
16/8/15	Championship	S2	Sheffield	H	Halton Stadium	W	48-12	Brown, Marsh (3), Runciman (2), Hanbury, Galea, Mellor, Flynn	Tickle 2/4, White 2/4, Marsh 0/2	4,567	-
23/8/15	Championship	S3	Hull Kingston Rovers	H	Halton Stadium	L	8-12	Clarkson, Whitley	White 0/2	5,461	-
6/9/15	Championship	S4	Bradford	A	Odsal Stadium	W	56-12	Mellor (3), Ah Van (3), Runciman, Cahill, Hanbury, Brown	White 2/4, Tickle 6/6	6,881	-
12/9/15	Championship	S5	Wakefield Trinity	A	Belle Vue	W	46-4	White, Hanbury (4), Heremaia, Brown, Flynn	Tickle 5/6, Ah Van 2/2	3,365	-
20/9/15	Championship	S6	Salford	H	Halton Stadium	L	10-24	Ah Van, White	Ah Van 1/2	3,876	-
27/9/15	Championship	S7	Leigh	H	Halton Stadium	W	50-6	Ah Van (2), Brown, Runciman, Flynn, Gerrard, Hanbury, Mellor, Owens	Tickle 5/7, Owens 2/2	5,550	-

== Player appearances ==
- Super League Only

FB=Fullback	C=Centre	W=Winger	SO=Stand-off	SH=Scrum half	PR=Prop	H=Hooker	SR=Second Row	L=Loose forward	B=Bench

No	Player	1	2	3	4	5	6	7	8	9	10	11	12	13	14	15	16	17	18	19	20	21	22	23	S1	S2	S3	S4	S5	S6	S7
1	Rhys Hanbury	FB	FB	FB	FB	FB	FB	FB	FB		FB	FB	FB	FB	FB	FB	FB	FB	FB	FB	FB	FB	FB	FB	FB	FB	FB	FB	FB	FB	FB
2	Paddy Flynn			W	W	W	W	W						W							W	W	W	W		W	W	W	W	W	W
3	Cameron Phelps	C	C	C	C		C	C	C	B	C	C	C			C	C														
4	Stefan Marsh	C	W			C	C	C	W	C	C	C	W	C	C	C	C	C	C	C		C		C	W	W	W				
5	Patrick Ah Van	W	Red card	W	W	W				W	W	W			W	W	W	W	W	W		W	W	W	W			W	W	W	W
6	Kevin Brown	SO		SO	SO				SO		SO	SO	SO	SO	SO		SO	SO	SO	SO					SO	SO	SO	SO	SO	SO	SO
7	Joe Mellor	SH	SH	SH	SH	SH	SH	SH	SH		SH		SH	SH	SH	SH	SH	SH	SH	SH	SH	SH	SH	SH	SH	SH	SH	SH	SH	SH	SH
8	Eamon O'Carroll	P	P	P	P	P		P	P		P	P	P	P							B	P	P								
9	Lloyd White			H	H				H	H	H	H	H	H	H	H	H	H	H	B					B	H	H	H	H	H	B
10	Manase Manuokafoa	B	B	B	B		B	B	B	B	B	B	B	B	B	B	B	B	B	P	P	B	B	B	B	B	B	B	B	B	P
11	Danny Galea	x	B	B	B	SR	SR		SR	SR	SR	SR	SR	SR	SR	SR	SR	SR		SR	SR	SR	SR	SR	SR	SR	SR	SR	SR		
12	Danny Tickle	SR	SR	SR	SR	L	B		SR					SR											B	SR	SR	SR	SR	B	SR
13	Hep Cahill	L	L	L	L																L	L	L	P	B		L	L	L	L	L
14	Chris Dean	B	C	C	C	C		SR	C		SR	SR	C	C	C				C	C	C	C	C	C	C	C	C	C	C	C	C
15	Jack Owens	x	W	x	x	x	W	W	W	W	W	W	W	W	W	W	W	W	W	W	W										B
16	Willie Isa	B	B									B	B	L	L	L	L	L	L	B	B	B	C	L	L	B					
17	Chris Clarkson	SR	SR	SR	SR	SR	SR	SR						B	SR	SR	SR	SR	SR	SR	SR	SR	SR	SR	SR		B	B	B	SR	
18	Paul Johnson	x	x	x	x	x	x	x	x	x	x	x	x	x	x	x	x	x	x	x	x	x	x	x	x	x	x	x	x	x	x
19	Ben Kavanagh	x	x	B	B	P	B	B		P		x	x	x	x	x	x	x	x	x	x	x	x	x	x	x	x	x	x	x	x
20	Declan Hulme	W		x	x	x	x	x	x	C	x	x	x	x	x	x	x	x	x	x	x	x	x	x	x	x	x	x	x	x	x
21	Danny Craven	x	SO	x	x	B	x	x	x	FB	x	x	x	x	x	x	x	x	x	x	C	x	B	B	x	x	x	x	x	B	x
22	Liam Carberry	H	H	x	x	x	x	x	x	x	x	x	x	x	x	x	x	x	x	x	x	x	x	x	x	x	x	x	x	x	x
23	Philip Joseph	x	x	x	x	x	B	B	x	P	B	x	x	B	B	B	x	B	B						x	x	x	x	x	x	x
24	Macgraff Leuluai	x	x	x	x	B	L	L	L	SR		L	L			B	B	B	SR	L	B	B	B	B		L	x	x	x	x	x
25	Alex Gerrard	P	P	x	x	B	P	H	B	L	L	B	B	P	P	P	P	P	P	P	P	B	B	B	P	P	P	P	P	P	P
26	Tom Gilmore	x	x	x	x	x	x	x	x	SO	x	SH	x	x	x	x	x	x	x	x	SO	SO	SO	SO	x	x	x	x	x	x	x
27	Grant Gore	x	x	x	x	SO	SO	B	x	SH	x	x	x	x	x	x	x	x	x	x	x	x	x	x	x	x	x	x	x	x	x
28	Matt Whitley	x	x	x	x	x	x	x	B	B	B	x	SR		B	B	B	C	B	B						B	B	B	B	SR	SR
29	Ed Chaimberlain	x	x	x	x	x	x	x	x	x	x	x	x	x	x	x	x	x	x	x	x	x	x	x	x	x	x	x	x	x	x
30	Ted Chapelhow	x	x	x	x	x	x	x	x	x	x	x	x	x	x	x	x	x	x	x	x	x	x	x	x	x	x	x	x	x	x
31	Ryan Ince	x	x	x	x	x	x	x	x	x	x	x	x	x	x	x	x	x	x	x	x	x	x	x	x	x	x	x	x	x	x
32	Almer Sevilla	x	x	x	x	x	x	x	x	x	x	x	x	x	x	x	x	x	x	x	x	x	x	x	x	x	x	x	x	x	x
33	Aaron Heremaia	B	B	B	B	H	H	SO	B	B	B	B	B	B	B	SO	B	B	B	H	H	H	H	H	H	B	B	B	B	B	H
34	Jay Chapelhow	x	x	x	x	x	x	x	x	x	x	x	x	x	x	x	x	x	x	x	x	x	x	x	x	x	x	x	x	x	B
35	Gil Dudson	x	x	P	P	B	P	P	P		P	P	P		P	P	P	P	P	B	B	P	P	P	P	P	P	P	P	P	B
36	Charly Runciman	x	x	x	x	x	x	x	x	x	x	x	x	x	x	x	x	x	x	x	x	x	x	x	C	C	C	C	C	C	C

= Injured

= Suspended

== Challenge Cup ==
LEGEND
Win
Draw
Loss

Date	Competition	Rnd	Vrs	H/A	Venue	Result	Score	Tries	Goals	Att	TV
17/5/15	Cup	6th	Batley	H	Halton Stadium	W	26-22	White, Ah Van, Brown (2), Phelps	Owens 3/5	3,866	-
28/6/15	Cup	QF	St. Helens	A	Langtree Park	L	20-36	Mellor, Craven, Ah Van, Dean	Craven 1/2, Ah Van 1/2	8,806	BBC Sport

== Player appearances ==
- Challenge Cup Games only

FB=Fullback	C=Centre	W=Winger	SO=Stand Off	SH=Scrum half	P=Prop	H=Hooker	SR=Second Row	L=Loose forward	B=Bench

No	Player	6	QF
1	Rhys Hanbury		FB
2	Paddy Flynn	W	W
3	Cameron Phelps	C	x
4	Stefan Marsh	C	C
5	Patrick Ah Van	W	W
6	Kevin Brown	SO	SO
7	Joe Mellor	SH	SH
8	Eamon O'Carroll		x
9	Lloyd White	H	x
10	Manase Manuokafoa	B	P
11	Danny Galea		x
12	Danny Tickle		x
13	Hep Cahill		B
14	Chris Dean	B	C
15	Jack Owens	FB	x
16	Willie Isa	L	B
17	Chris Clarkson	SR	SR
18	Paul Johnson	x	x
19	Ben Kavanagh	x	x
20	Declan Hulme	x	x
21	Danny Craven	x	B
22	Liam Carberry	x	x
23	Philip Joseph	P	x
24	Macgraff Leuluai	B	L
25	Alex Gerrard		P
26	Tom Gilmore	x	x
27	Grant Gore	x	x
28	Matt Whitley	SR	SR
29	Ed Chaimberlain	x	x
30	Ted Chapelhow	x	x
31	Ryan Ince	x	x
32	Almer Sevilla	x	x
33	Aaron Heremaia	B	H
34	Jay Chapelhow	x	x
35	Gil Dudson	P	B

== 2015 squad statistics ==
- Appearances and points include (Super League, Challenge Cup and Play-offs) as of 27 September 2015.

No	Player	Position	Age	Previous club	Apps	Tries	Goals	DG	Points
1	Rhys Hanbury	Fullback	N/A	Crusaders	30	11	0	0	44
2	Paddy Flynn	Wing	N/A	Widnes Vikings Academy	18	10	0	0	40
3	Cameron Phelps	Centre	N/A	Hull F.C.	14	4	0	0	16
4	Stefan Marsh	Centre	N/A	Wigan Warriors	24	14	9	0	74
5	Patrick Ah Van	Wing	N/A	Bradford Bulls	23	19	4	0	84
6	Kevin Brown	Stand off	N/A	Huddersfield Giants	22	20	0	0	80
7	Joe Mellor	Scrum half	N/A	Wigan Warriors	30	11	0	0	44
8	Eamon O'Carroll	Prop	N/A	Hull F.C.	14	1	0	0	4
9	Lloyd White	Hooker	N/A	Crusaders	22	9	12	0	60
10	Manase Manuokafoa	Prop	N/A	Bradford Bulls	31	3	0	0	12
11	Danny Galea	Second row	N/A	Penrith Panthers	25	4	0	0	16
12	Danny Tickle	Second row	N/A	Hull F.C.	15	0	29	0	58
13	Hep Cahill	Loose forward	N/A	Crusaders	15	1	0	0	4
14	Chris Dean	Centre	N/A	Wakefield Trinity Wildcats	27	5	0	0	20
15	Jack Owens	Fullback	N/A	Widnes Vikings Academy	18	9	46	0	128
16	Willie Isa	Centre	N/A	Castleford Tigers	19	0	0	0	0
17	Chris Clarkson	Second row	N/A	Leeds Rhinos	25	5	0	0	20
18	Paul Johnson	Loose forward	N/A	Hull F.C.	0	0	0	0	0
19	Ben Kavanagh	Prop	N/A	Wigan Warriors	6	0	0	0	0
20	Declan Hulme	Wing	N/A	Widnes Vikings Academy	2	0	0	0	0
21	Danny Craven	Scrum half	N/A	Widnes Vikings Academy	8	1	1	1	7
22	Liam Carberry	Hooker	N/A	Wigan Warriors	2	0	0	0	0
23	Philip Joseph	Prop	N/A	Bradford Bulls	10	0	0	0	0
24	Macgraff Leuluai	Prop	N/A	Leigh Centurions	19	1	0	0	4
25	Alex Gerrard	Prop	N/A	Widnes Vikings Academy	29	3	0	0	12
26	Tom Gilmore	Stand off	N/A	Widnes Vikings Academy	6	3	2	1	17
27	Grant Gore	Stand off	N/A	Widnes Vikings Academy	4	0	0	0	0
28	Matt Whitley	Second row	N/A	Widnes Vikings Academy	18	3	0	0	12
29	Ed Chaimberlain	Centre	N/A	Widnes Vikings Academy	0	0	0	0	0
30	Ted Chapelhow	Prop	N/A	Widnes Vikings Academy	0	0	0	0	0
31	Ryan Ince	Wing	N/A	Widnes Vikings Academy	0	0	0	0	0
32	Almer Salvilla	Hooker	N/A	Widnes Vikings Academy	0	0	0	0	0
33	Aaron Heremaia	Hooker	N/A	Hull F.C.	32	4	0	0	16
34	Jay Chapelhow	Prop	N/A	Widnes Vikings Academy	1	0	0	0	0
35	Gil Dudson	Prop	N/A	Wigan Warriors	28	0	0	0	0
36	Charly Runciman	Centre	N/A	Melbourne Storm	7	6	0	0	24

= Injured = Suspended

== 2015 transfers in/out ==
In

Player	Position	Previous club	Contract	Announced
(New Zealand) Aaron Heremaia	Hooker	Hull F.C.	2 Years	June 2014
(Tonga) Manase Manuokafoa	Prop	Bradford Bulls	2 Years	July 2014
(England) Chris Clarkson	Second row	Leeds Rhinos	1 Year Loan	September 2014
(Wales) Gil Dudson	Prop	Wigan Warriors	2 Years	January 2015

Out

Player	Position	Signed for	Contract	Date
(England) Steve Pickersgill	Prop	Retired	N/A	May 2014
(England) Jon Clarke	Hooker	Retired - S & C Coach	N/A	June 2014
(England) Adam Lawton	Second row	Australia	1 Year	July 2014
(Wales) Rhodri Lloyd	Second row	Wigan Warriors	Loan return	September 2014
(England) Paul Clough	Prop	Bradford Bulls	2 Years	September 2014
(Republic of Ireland) Dave Allen	Second row	Whitehaven	1 Year	November 2014
