= 2015 Super League season =

British rugby league season

Super League XX
- League: Super League
- Duration: 30 Rounds
- Teams: 12
- Lowest attendance: 2,712; Salford City Reds vs Wakefield Trinity Wildcats, (15 March)
- Average attendance: 10,019
- Broadcast partners: Sky Sports; BBC Sport; Fox Sports beIN Sports; Fox Soccer Plus; Sport Klub

2015 season
- Champions: Leeds Rhinos; 7th Super League; 10th British title
- League Leaders: Leeds Rhinos
- Runners-up: Wigan Warriors
- Biggest home win: Warrington Wolves 80-0 Wakefield Trinity Wildcats (11 April)
- Biggest away win: Wakefield Trinity Wildcats 20-58 Castleford Tigers (19 July)
- Man of Steel: (England) Zak Hardaker
- Top point-scorer: (England) Luke Gale (247)
- Top try-scorer: (England) Jermaine McGillvary (27)

The Super League XX, known as the First Utility Super League XX for sponsorship reasons, was the 2015 season of Super League.

Twelve teams competed over 23 rounds, including the Magic Weekend, after which the eight highest entered the play-offs for a place in the Grand Final. The four lowest teams entered the Super League Qualifying Play-off, along with the four highest Championship teams, to decide which will play in Super League XXI.

Leeds Rhinos became only the 3rd team to complete the Treble after defeating Wigan Warriors 22-20 in front of a new record attendance of 73,512 at Old Trafford to win their 7th Super League title.

== Teams ==
Super League XX is the first year since 2008 in which there is a promotion and relegation with the Championship. Super League has been reduced to 12 teams as part of the re-structuring of Super League and the Championship.

Eleven teams in Super League are from the North of England: five teams, Warrington, St. Helens, Salford, Wigan and Widnes, west of the Pennines in the historic county of Lancashire and six teams, Huddersfield, Wakefield Trinity, Leeds, Castleford, Hull F.C. and Hull Kingston Rovers, to the east in Yorkshire. Catalans Dragons, in Perpignan, France, are the only team outside the North of England. With Bradford Bulls and London Broncos being relegated last season, this leaves St Helens, Wigan Warriors, Warrington Wolves and Leeds Rhinos as the only teams to have played in every season of Super League since 1996.

Team	Stadium	Capacity	City/Area
Castleford Tigers (2015 season)	The Mend-O-Hose Jungle	11,750	Castleford, West Yorkshire
Catalans Dragons (2015 season)	Stade Gilbert Brutus	14,000	Perpignan, Pyrénées-Orientales, France
Huddersfield Giants (2015 season)	John Smith's Stadium	24,544	Huddersfield, West Yorkshire
Hull F.C. (2015 season)	Kingston Communications Stadium	25,404	Kingston upon Hull, East Riding of Yorkshire
Hull Kingston Rovers (2015 season)	KC Lightstream Stadium	12,225	Kingston upon Hull, East Riding of Yorkshire
Leeds Rhinos (2015 season)	Headingley Carnegie Stadium	22,250	Leeds, West Yorkshire
Salford Red Devils (2015 season)	AJ Bell Stadium	12,000	Salford, Greater Manchester
St Helens R.F.C. (2015 season)	Langtree Park	18,000	St. Helens, Merseyside
Wakefield Trinity Wildcats (2015 season)	Rapid Solicitors Stadium	11,000	Wakefield, West Yorkshire
Warrington Wolves (2015 season)	Halliwell Jones Stadium	15,500	Warrington, Cheshire
Widnes Vikings (2015 season)	The Select Security Stadium	13,500	Widnes, Cheshire
Wigan Warriors (2015 season)	DW Stadium	25,138	Wigan, Greater Manchester

== Regular season table ==
The regular season sees teams play each other home and away, and one team for a third time at the Magic Weekend. After 23 games, the "Super 8's" begin and the league is split into two mini leagues. Teams finishing in the top 8 compete in the Super League Super 8s while teams finishing in the bottom four will join the top 4 teams from the Championship in The Qualifiers to determine who will play in next seasons Super League.

Pos	Team	Pld	W	D	L	PF	PA	PD	Pts	Qualification
1	Leeds Rhinos	23	16	1	6	758	477	+281	33	Super League Super 8s
2	St Helens	23	16	0	7	598	436	+162	32	Super League Super 8s
3	Wigan Warriors	23	15	1	7	589	413	+176	31	Super League Super 8s
4	Huddersfield Giants	23	13	2	8	538	394	+144	28	Super League Super 8s
5	Castleford Tigers	23	13	0	10	547	505	+42	26	Super League Super 8s
6	Warrington Wolves	23	12	0	11	552	456	+96	24	Super League Super 8s
7	Hull F.C.	23	11	0	12	452	484	−32	22	Super League Super 8s
8	Catalans Dragons	23	9	2	12	561	574	−13	20	Super League Super 8s
9	Widnes Vikings	23	9	1	13	518	565	−47	19	The Qualifiers
10	Hull Kingston Rovers	23	9	0	14	534	646	−112	18	The Qualifiers
11	Salford Red Devils	23	8	1	14	447	617	−170	17	The Qualifiers
12	Wakefield Trinity Wildcats	23	3	0	20	402	929	−527	6	The Qualifiers

Source: Rugby League Project
Rules for classification: 1) Points; 2) Points difference; 3) Number of points scored;

== Super 8s ==
=== Super League ===
The Super League Super 8's sees the top 8 Super League teams play 7 games each. Each team's points are carried over with top 4 teams entering the playoffs for the Super League Grand Final.

Pos	Team	Pld	W	D	L	PF	PA	PD	Pts	Qualification
1	Leeds Rhinos (L, C)	30	20	1	9	944	650	+294	41	Semi-finals
2	Wigan Warriors	30	20	1	9	798	530	+268	41	Semi-finals
3	Huddersfield Giants	30	18	2	10	750	534	+216	38	Semi-finals
4	St Helens	30	19	0	11	766	624	+142	38	Semi-finals
5	Castleford Tigers	30	16	0	14	731	746	−15	32	
6	Warrington Wolves	30	15	0	15	714	636	+78	30	
7	Catalans Dragons	30	13	2	15	739	770	−31	28	
8	Hull F.C.	30	12	0	18	620	716	−96	24	

Source: Rugby League Project
(C) Champions; (L) League Leaders' Shield Winners

=== The Qualifiers ===
The Qualifiers sees the bottom 4 teams from Super League join the top 4 teams from the Championship. The points totals are reset to 0 and each team plays 7 games each, playing every other team once. After 7 games each the teams finishing 1st, 2nd, and 3rd gain qualification to Super League XXI in 2016. The teams finishing 4th and 5th playoff in the Million Pound Game for the final spot in next seasons Super League. The loser of the Million Pound Game along with the teams finishing 6th, 7th and 8th will play in next seasons Championship

Pos	Team	Pld	W	D	L	PF	PA	PD	Pts	Qualification
1	Hull Kingston Rovers	7	7	0	0	234	118	+116	14	2016 Super League
2	Widnes Vikings	7	5	0	2	232	70	+162	10	2016 Super League
3	Salford Red Devils	7	5	0	2	239	203	+36	10	2016 Super League
4	Wakefield Trinity Wildcats (W)	7	3	0	4	153	170	−17	6	Million Pound Game
5	Bradford Bulls	7	3	0	4	167	240	−73	6	Million Pound Game
6	Halifax	7	2	0	5	162	186	−24	4	2016 Championship
7	Sheffield Eagles	7	2	0	5	152	267	−115	4	2016 Championship
8	Leigh Centurions	7	1	0	6	146	231	−85	2	2016 Championship

Source: Rugby League Project
Rules for classification: 1) Points; 2) Points difference; 3) Number of points scored;
(W) Million Pound Game Winner

== Playoffs ==
=== Super League ===
#	Home	Score	Away	Match Information
#	Home	Score	Away	Date and Time (Local)	Venue	Referee	Attendance
SEMI-FINALS
SF1	Wigan Warriors	32 – 8	Huddersfield Giants	1 October, 20:00 BST	DW Stadium	Ben Thaler	10,035
SF2	Leeds Rhinos	20 – 13	St. Helens	2 October, 20:00 BST	Headingley Carnegie Stadium	Robert Hicks	17,192
GRAND FINAL
F	Leeds Rhinos	22 – 20	Wigan Warriors	10 October, 18:00 BST	Old Trafford, Manchester	Ben Thaler	73,512

=== Million Pound Game ===
#	Home	Score	Away	Match Information
#	Home	Score	Away	Date and Time (Local)	Venue	Referee	Attendance
Million Pound Game
F	Wakefield Trinity Wildcats	24 – 16	Bradford Bulls	3 October, 14:50 BST	Belle Vue	R. Silverwood	7,246

== Player statistics ==
=== Top Try Scorers ===
Rank	Player	Club	Tries
1	(England) Jermaine McGillvary	Huddersfield Giants	27
2	(England) Tom Lineham	Hull F.C.	25
3	(England) Joe Burgess	Wigan Warriors	23
4	(England) Dominic Manfredi	Wigan Warriors	20
5	(England) Ryan Hall	Leeds Rhinos	19
6=	(New Zealand) Denny Solomona	Castleford Tigers	18
6=	(England) Aaron Murphy	Huddersfield Giants	18
6=	(Australia) Justin Carney	Castleford Tigers	18
6=	(England) Adam Swift	St Helens	18
10	(Australia) Joel Monaghan	Warrington Wolves	17

=== Top goalscorers ===
Rank	Player	Club	Goals
1	(England) Kevin Sinfield	Leeds Rhinos	105
2	(England) Luke Gale	Castleford Tigers	101
3	(Australia) Scott Dureau	Catalans Dragons	94
4	(Scotland) Danny Brough	Huddersfield Giants	93
5	(England) Matty Smith	Wigan Warriors	76

=== Top try assists ===
Rank	Player	Club	Assists
1	(Scotland) Danny Brough	Huddersfield Giants	31
2=	(England) Luke Gale	Castleford Tigers	27
2=	(England) Danny McGuire	Leeds Rhinos	27
4	(Australia) Scott Dureau	Catalans Dragons	23
5	(England) George Williams	Wigan Warriors	21
6=	(England) Marc Sneyd	Hull F.C.	20
6=	(England) Stefan Ratchford	Warrington Wolves	20
8=	(England) Kevin Sinfield	Leeds Rhinos	18
8=	(England) Kevin Brown	Widnes Vikings	18
9=	(England) Leroy Cudjoe	Huddersfield Giants	16
9=	(Australia) Rhys Hanbury	Widnes Vikings	16

=== Top points scorers ===
Rank	Player	Club	Points
1	(England) Luke Gale	Castleford Tigers	247
2	(England) Kevin Sinfield	Leeds Rhinos	225
3	(Scotland) Danny Brough	Huddersfield Giants	208
4	(Australia) Scott Dureau	Catalans Dragons	202
5	(Italy) Josh Mantellato	Hull Kingston Rovers	196
6	(England) Matty Smith	Wigan Warriors	168
7	(England) Marc Sneyd	Hull F.C.	156
8	(Australia) Luke Walsh	Catalans Dragons	126
9	(England) Josh Griffin	Salford Red Devils	116
10	(England) Jack Owens	Widnes Vikings	114

== End-of-season awards ==
Awards are presented for outstanding contributions and efforts to players and clubs in the week leading up to the Super League Grand Final:

- Man of Steel: Zak Hardaker
- Coach of the year: Brian McDermott
- Super League club of the year: Leeds Rhinos
- Young player of the year: George Williams
- Foundation of the year: Warrington Wolves
- Rhino "Top Gun": Kevin Sinfield
- Metre-maker: Alex Walmsley (4092)
- Top Try Scorer: Jermaine McGillvary (27)
- Outstanding Achievement Award:
- Hit Man: Danny Houghton

== Media ==
=== Television ===
2015 is the fourth year of a five-year contract with Sky Sports to televise 70 matches per season. The deal which runs until 2016 is worth £90million.

Sky Sports coverage in the UK will see two live matches broadcast each week, usually at 8:00 pm on Thursday and Friday nights.

Regular commentators will be Eddie Hemmings and Mike Stephenson with summarisers including Phil Clarke, Brian Carney, Barrie McDermott and Terry O'Connor. Sky will broadcast highlights on Sunday nights on Super League - Full Time at 10 p.m.

BBC Sport will broadcast a highlights programme called the Super League Show, presented by Tanya Arnold. The BBC show two weekly broadcasts of the programme, the first to the BBC North West, Yorkshire, North East and Cumbria, and East Yorkshire and Lincolnshire regions on Monday evenings at 11:35 p.m. on BBC One, while a repeat showing is shown nationally on BBC Two on Tuesday afternoons at 1.30 p.m. The Super League Show is also available for one week after broadcast for streaming or download via the BBC iPlayer in the UK only. End of season play-offs are shown on BBC Two across the whole country in a weekly highlights package on Sunday afternoons.

Internationally, Super League is shown live or delayed on Showtime Sports (Middle East), Sky Sport (New Zealand), TV 2 Sport (Norway), Fox Soccer Plus (United States), Fox Sports (Australia) and Sportsnet World (Canada).

=== Radio ===
BBC Coverage:

- BBC Radio 5 Live Sports Extra (National DAB Digital Radio) will carry two Super League commentaries each week on Thursday and Friday nights (both kick off 8pm); this will be through the 5 Live Rugby league programme which is presented by Dave Woods with a guest summariser (usually a Super League player or coach) and also includes interviews and debate..
- BBC Radio Humberside will have full match commentary of all Hull KR and Hull matches.
- BBC Radio Leeds carry commentaries featuring Leeds, Castleford, Wakefield and Huddersfield.
- BBC Radio Manchester will carry commentary of Wigan and Salford whilst sharing commentary of Warrington with BBC Radio Merseyside.
- BBC Radio Merseyside (will have commentary on St Helens and Widnes matches whilst sharing commentary of Warrington with BBC Radio Manchester.

Commercial Radio Coverage:

- 102.4 Wish FM will carry commentaries of Wigan & St Helens matches.
- 107.2 Wire FM will carry commentaries on Warrington and Widnes matches.
- Radio Yorkshire will launch in March carrying Super League commentaries.
- Radio Warrington (Online Station) all Warrington home games and some away games.
- Grand Sud FM covers every Catalans Dragons Home Match (in French).
- Radio France Bleu Roussillon covers every Catalans Dragons Away Match (in French).

All Super League commentaries on any station are available via the particular stations on-line streaming.
