= Manase Manuokafoa =

Tongan rugby league footballer (born 1985)

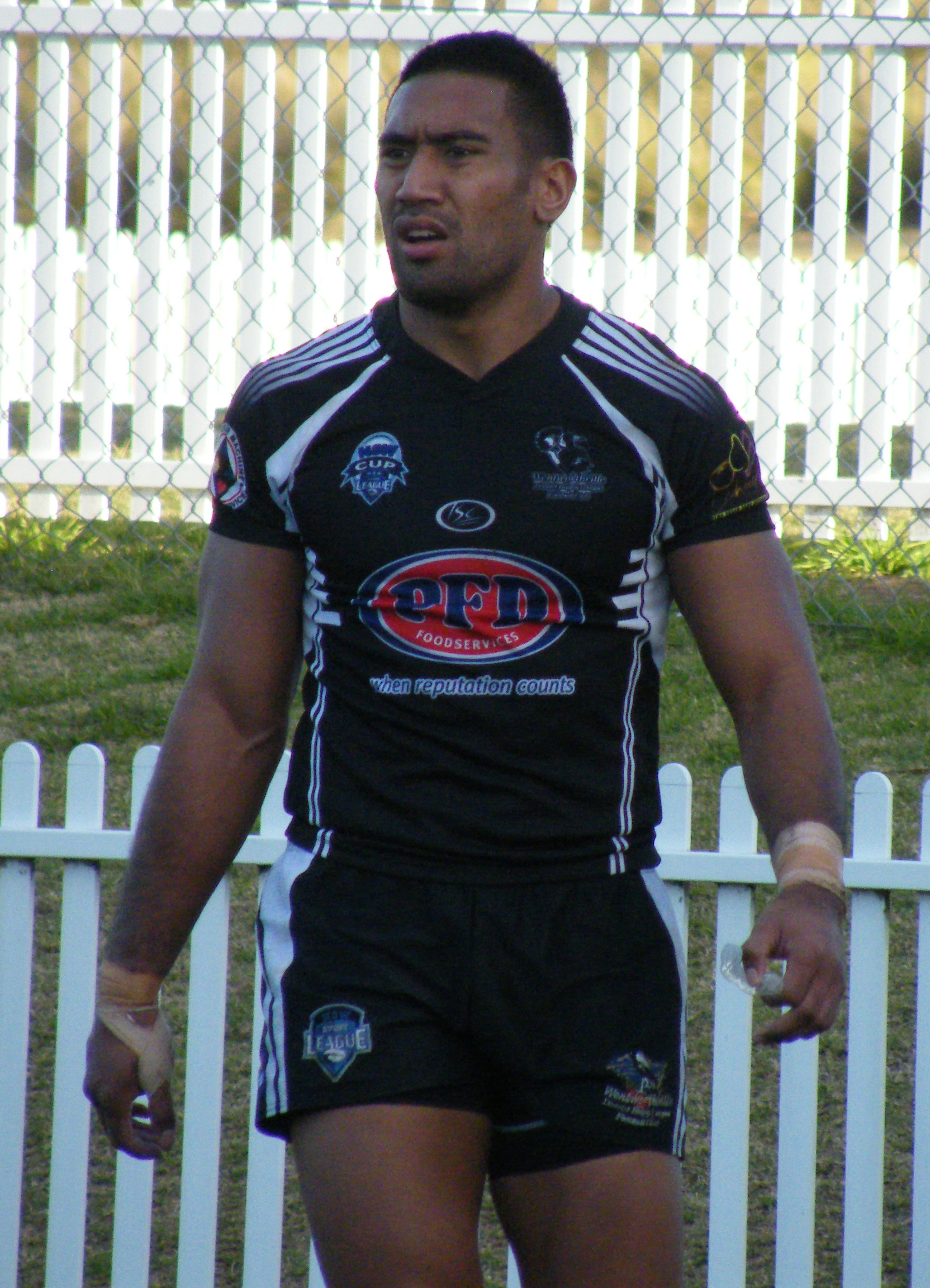

Personal information
- Born: 24 March 1985 (age 41) Sydney, New South Wales, Australia

Playing information
- Height: 1.90 m (6 ft 3 in)
- Weight: 116 kg (18 st 4 lb)
- Position: Prop, Second-row, Loose forward
Club
Years	Team	Pld	T	G	FG	P
2005–08	South Sydney	71	4	0	0	16
2009–10	North Qld Cowboys	16	0	0	0	0
2010–11	Parramatta Eels	2	0	0	0	0
2012–14	Bradford Bulls	76	3	0	0	12
2015–17	Widnes Vikings	74	4	0	0	16
2017–18	Racing Club Albi XIII	19	2	0	0	8
	Total	258	13	0	0	52
Representative
Years	Team	Pld	T	G	FG	P
2005–08	Tonga	4	0	0	0	0

Manase Manuokafoa (born 24 March 1985) is a former Tongan international rugby league footballer who last played as a prop for RC Albi XIII in the Elite One Championship.

== Background ==
He was born in Sydney, New South Wales, Australia.

== Playing career ==
As a Mascot Jets junior who has come through every South Sydney representative junior grades, in 2005 he came through to the NRL in the green and red of the South Sydney Rabbitohs, scoring two tries in his first season.

The following year, Manuokafoa played 19 games as the club finished last on the table. In the 2007 NRL season, he was part of the South Sydney team which reached the finals for the first time since 1989. Manuokafoa played in the club's elimination final loss against Manly-Warringah at Brookvale Oval.

In July 2008, Manuokafoa signed a three-year deal with the North Queensland Cowboys from the 2009 NRL season.

Manuokafoa was named in the 2008 World Cup training squads for both New Zealand and Tonga and ultimately went on to play for Tonga in the World Cup.

He joined the Parramatta Eels in 2010 and made two appearances for the club before being released at the end of 2011.

He then moved to England to play in the Super League with the Bradford side for the 2012 season.

With the Bradford club being relegated to the Championship for the 2015 season, Manase signed a two-year deal with Super League side the Widnes Vikings.

== Bradford Bulls ==
2012 - 2012 Season

Manuokafoa missed the entire pre-season games as a result of a rupture cruciate ligament before the friendly against Castleford.

He missed Rounds 1-4 due to an injury. He featured in 23 consecutive games from Round 5 (Warrington) to Round 27 (Catalans Dragons). He also featured in the Challenge Cup against Doncaster and Warrington. Manuokafoa scored against Widnes (1 try) and London Broncos (1 try).

2013 - 2013 Season

Manuokafoa signed a two-year extension to his contract in the off-season. He featured in the pre-season friendlies against Dewsbury and Leeds. He scored against Dewsbury (1 try).

He featured in fourteen consecutive games from Round 1 (Wakefield Trinity Wildcats) to Round 14 (Leeds). He was injured for Rounds 15-18. Manuokafoa played in Round 19 (Widnes) to Round 27 (Huddersfield). He also featured in the Challenge Cup against Rochdale. He was injured for Round 5 of the Challenge Cup.

2014 - 2014 Season

Manuokafoa featured in the pre-season friendlies against Hull FC, Dewsbury and Castleford.

Manase featured in Round 1 Castleford to Round 10 (Wigan) then in Round 14 (Catalans Dragons) to Round 27 (London Broncos). He also featured in Round 4 (Oldham R.L.F.C.) to the Quarter Final (Warrington) in the Challenge Cup. He scored against London Broncos (1 try).

== Widnes Vikings ==
2015

Manuokafoa featured in Round 1 (Wigan) to Round 4 (Huddersfield). Then in Round 6 (Hull Kingston Rovers) to Qualifier 7 (Leigh). He played in the Challenge Cup in Round 6 (Batley) to the Quarter Final (St Helens R.F.C.).

2016

Manuokafoa featured in Round 1 (Wakefield Trinity Wildcats) to Round 9 (Catalans Dragons) then in Round 11 (Salford) to Round 12 (Warrington). Manase played in the Challenge Cup in Round 5 (Rochdale).

== Statistics ==
Season	Appearance	Tries	Goals	F/G	Points
2012 Bradford Bulls	25	2	0	0	8
2013 Bradford Bulls	24	0	0	0	0
2014 Bradford Bulls	27	1	0	0	4
2015 Widnes Vikings	31	3	0	0	12
2016 Widnes Vikings	12	1	0	0	4
Total	119	7	0	0	28
