= Declan Hulme =

English rugby league player

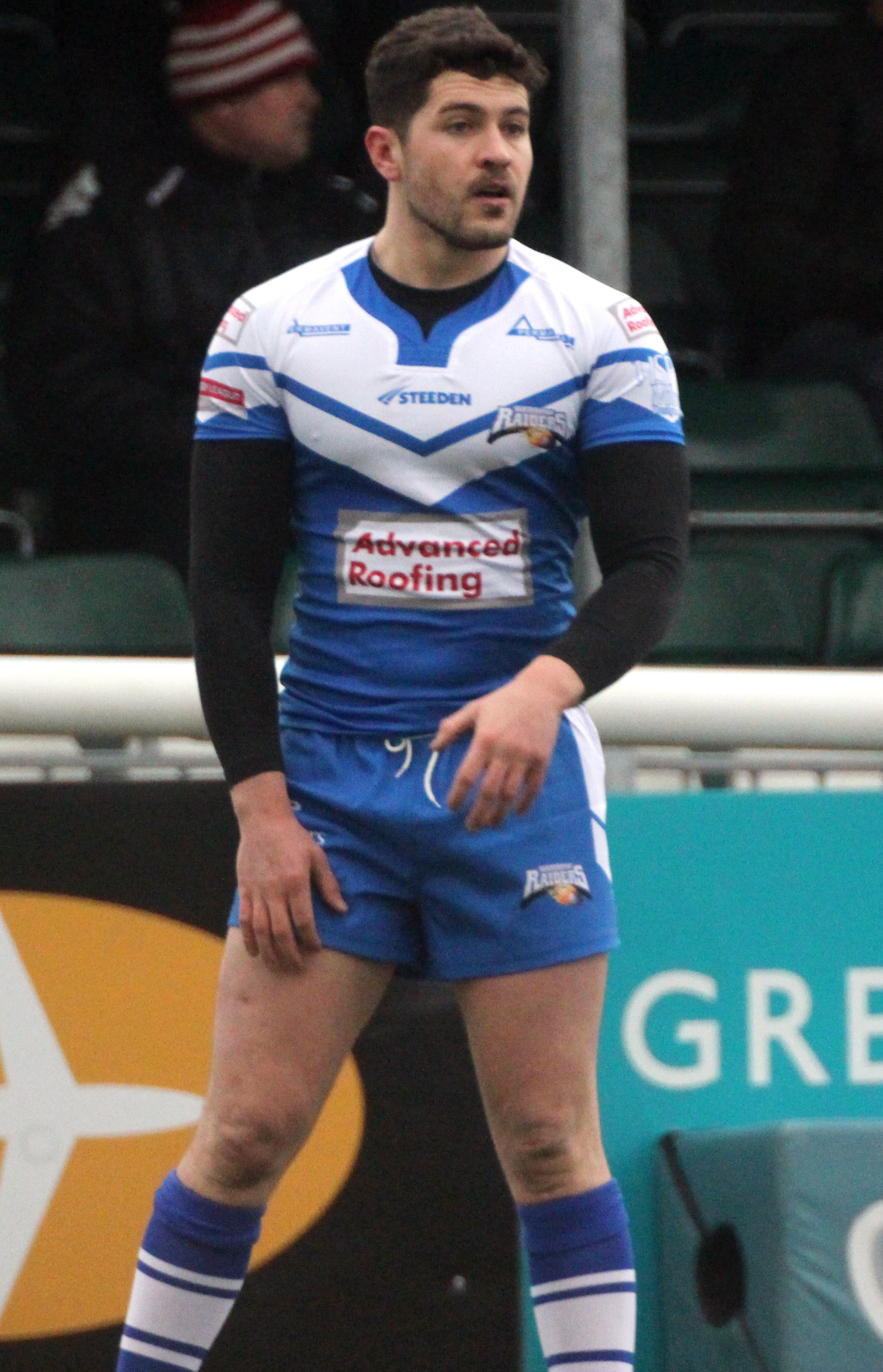

Personal information
- Full name: Declan Sephton-Hulme
- Born: 14 January 1993 (age 33) St Helens, Merseyside, England
- Height: 5 ft 11 in (1.80 m)
- Weight: 14 st 2 lb (90 kg)

Playing information
- Position: Wing, Centre
Club
Years	Team	Pld	T	G	FG	P
2013–15	Widnes Vikings	7	4	0	0	16
2013(loan)	→ Workington Town	14	6	0	0	24
2014(loan)	→ North Wales Crusaders	3	0	0	0	0
2014(loan)	→ Workington Town	7	3	0	0	12
2015(loan)	→ Whitehaven	11	7	0	0	28
2016	Workington Town	28	11	0	0	8
2017–22	Barrow Raiders	58	20	0	0	80
2023–	North Wales Crusaders	0	0	0	0	0
	Total	128	51	0	0	168
- Source: As of 10 February 2023

Declan Hulme (born 14 January 1993) is an English rugby league footballer who plays as a centre or on the wing for the North Wales Crusaders in League 1.

== Background ==
Hulme was born in St Helens, Merseyside, England.

== Career ==
Hulme started his career at Widnes, and made his début against Salford at the end of the 2013 Super League season. He scored his first Vikings try during the 2014 season against Wakefield Trinity Wildcats.
