= Joe Mellor =

English rugby league footballer (born 1990)

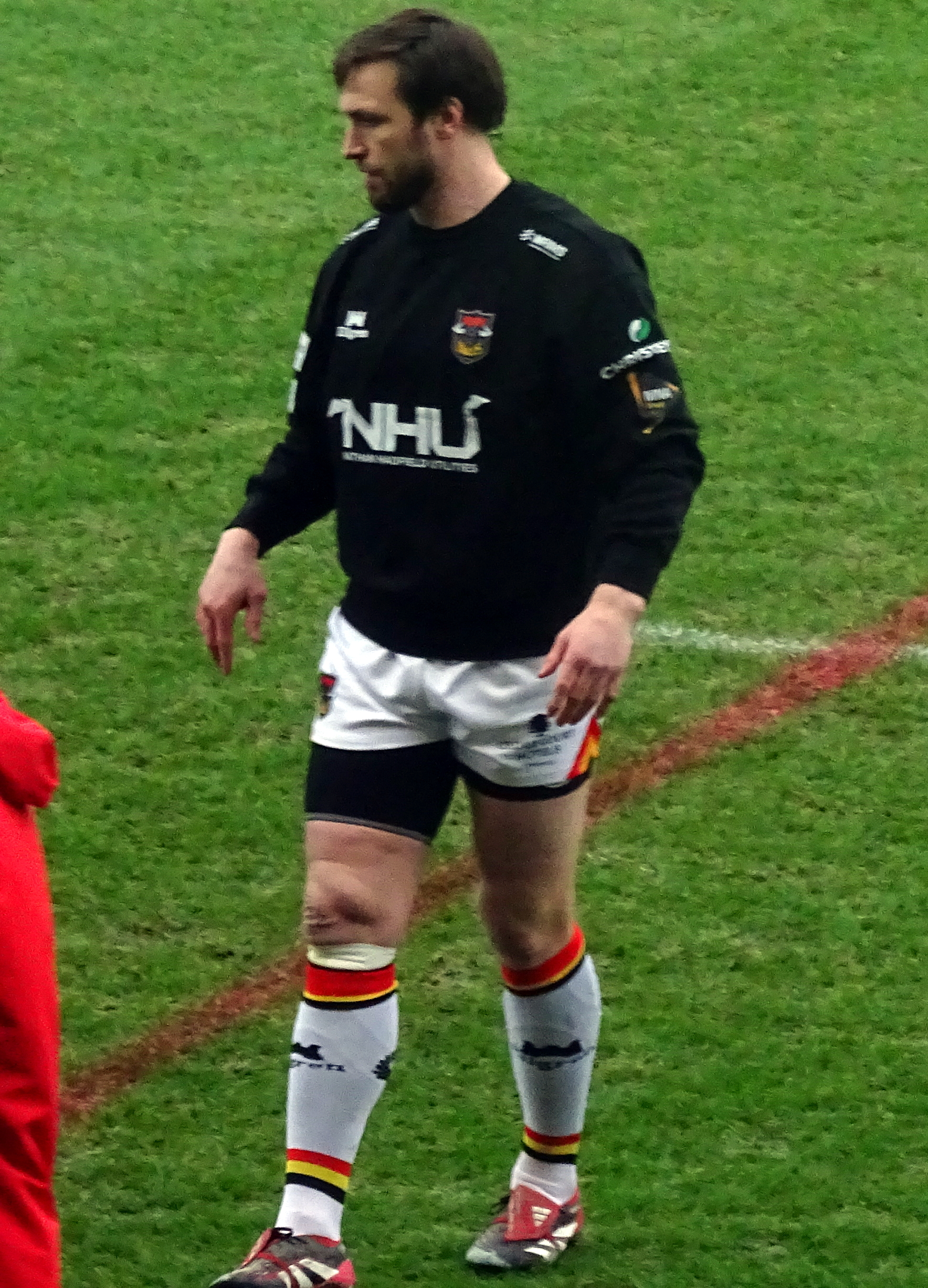

Personal information
- Full name: Joseph Patrick Mellor
- Born: 28 November 1990 (age 35) Warrington, Cheshire, England
- Height: 5 ft 11 in (1.80 m)
- Weight: 11 st 9 lb (74 kg)

Playing information
- Position: Scrum-half, Stand-off, Hooker, Loose forward
Club
Years	Team	Pld	T	G	FG	P
2011–12	Wigan Warriors	4	3	0	0	12
2011(loan)	→ Harlequins RL	1	0	0	0	0
2011(loan)	→ Widnes Vikings	14	7	0	0	28
2012(loan)	→ Widnes Vikings	11	4	0	0	16
2013–18	Widnes Vikings	152	55	0	1	221
2019–20	Toronto Wolfpack	23	8	0	0	32
2021–23	Leigh Centurions	71	22	0	0	88
2024–25	Salford Red Devils	28	8	0	0	32
2026–	Bradford Bulls	5	0	0	0	0
	Total	309	107	0	1	429
- Source: As of 14 October 2026

Joseph Patrick Mellor (born 28 November 1990) is an English professional rugby league footballer who plays as a stand-off, scrum-half or loose forward for the Bradford Bulls in the Super League.

He previously played for the Wigan Warriors in the Super League, and on loan from Wigan at Harlequins RL in the top flight and the Widnes Vikings in the Championship and the Super League. Mellor later joined Widnes on a permanent deal in the Super League. He also played for the Toronto Wolfpack in the Championship and the top flight.

== Background ==
Mellor was born in Warrington, Cheshire, England.

== Club career ==
=== Wigan Warriors ===
Mellor signed as a professional for Wigan from Warrington-based amateur side Latchford. In 2009, Mellor was awarded Man-of-the-Match in the Reserve Grand Final following a fantastic performance. An injury-plagued 2010 meant limited appearances in Wigan's junior teams, however, he did play in the Under-20 Cup Final win over St Helens.

=== Harlequins RL (loan) ===
He made his Super League début in rugby league whilst on loan at Harlequins in 2011's Super League XVI, coming off the bench in a 27-16 win over St. Helens in round five.

=== Widnes Vikings ===
On his return to Wigan, Mellor was sent on loan to Widnes along with Dom Crosby and Logan Tomkins. Mellor featured at stand-off for the Chemics, scoring tries in the home fixtures against Barrow and Toulouse Olympique, and a brace away at Barrow.

Mellor was once again loaned to Widnes in 2012, and joined the club on a permanent contract after being released by Wigan at the end of 2012.

After the departure of captain Kevin Brown to the Warrington Wolves at the end of 2016, Mellor was handed co-captaincy alongside Chris Houston, and has been given the number 6 jersey.

=== Leigh ===
On 10 November 2020, it was announced that Mellor would join Leigh for the 2021 Super League season. On 28 May 2022, Mellor played for Leigh in their 2022 RFL 1895 Cup final victory over Featherstone. On 3 October 2022, Mellor played for Leigh in their Million Pound Game victory over Batley which saw the club promoted back to the Super League. On 12 August 2023, Mellor played for Leigh in their 2023 Challenge Cup final victory over Hull Kingston Rovers. It was Leigh's first major trophy for 52 years. Mellor played 23 games for Leigh in the 2023 Super League season as the club finished fifth on the table and qualified for the playoffs. He played in their elimination playoff loss against Hull Kington Rovers.

=== Salford Red Devils ===
On 15 December 2023 it was reported that he had signed for Salford Red Devils in the Super League on a 2-year deal.

=== Bradford Bulls ===
On 11 November 2025 it was reported that he had signed for Bradford Bulls in the Super League
