= Ted Chapelhow =

English rugby league footballer

Personal information
- Full name: Edward Chapelhow
- Born: 21 September 1995 (age 31) Runcorn, Cheshire, England
- Height: 6 ft 4 in (1.93 m)
- Weight: 16 st 7 lb (105 kg)

Playing information
- Position: Prop
Club
| Years | Team | Pld | T | G | FG | P |
|---|---|---|---|---|---|---|
| 2015–20 | Widnes Vikings | 73 | 6 | 0 | 0 | 24 |
| 2015(loan) | → Whitehaven | 20 | 2 | 0 | 0 | 8 |
| 2016(loan) | → Whitehaven | 24 | 2 | 0 | 0 | 8 |
| 2017(loan) | → Bradford Bulls | 6 | 2 | 0 | 0 | 8 |
| 2018(loan) | → N Wales Crusaders | 1 | 0 | 0 | 0 | 0 |
| 2021–23 | Newcastle Thunder | 62 | 7 | 0 | 0 | 28 |
| 2024– | Oldham | 78 | 15 | 0 | 0 | 60 |
| | Total | 264 | 34 | 0 | 0 | 136 |
- Source: As of 28 September 2026
- Relatives: Jay Chapelhow (brother)

Edward Chapelhow (born 21 September 1995) is an English professional rugby league footballer who plays as a prop for Oldham in the RFL Championship.

== Background ==
Ted Chapelhow was born in Runcorn, Cheshire, England. His twin brother Jay Chapelhow also plays for Oldham RLFC in the RFL League 1.

== Career ==
=== Widnes Vikings ===
Chapelhow is a graduate of the Widnes Vikings Academy system and played his junior rugby league for the West Bank Bears club. He has represented England at youth team level.

In 2015 he made his professional début for Whitehaven in the Kingstone Press Championship.

He has since returned to Whitehaven in the Kingstone Press Championship as a dual-registered player.

=== Ottawa Aces ===
On 10 August 2020 it was announced that Chapelhow, along with his twin brother Jay, had signed for Ottawa Aces.

=== Newcastle Thunder ===
Due to Ottawa Aces' deferred competition start date, Chapelhow, again with his twin brother, both instead signed up for Newcastle Thunder on 24 December 2020.

=== Oldham R.L.F.C. ===
On 6 November 2023 it was reported that he had signed for Oldham R.L.F.C. in the RFL League 1 on a one-year deal joining his brother Jay.
