= Rhys Hanbury =

Australian rugby league footballer (born 1985)

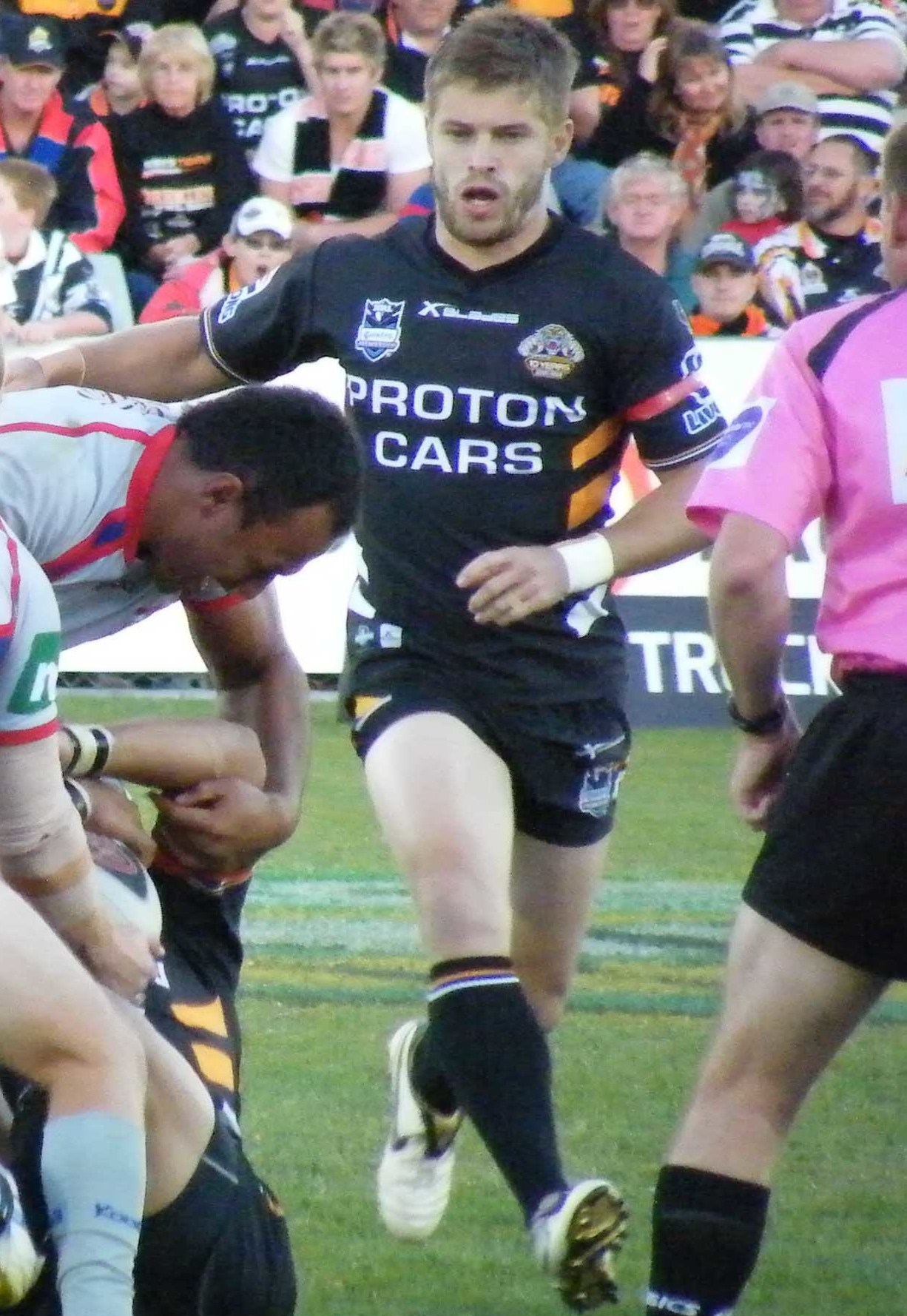

Personal information
- Full name: Rhys Hanbury
- Born: 27 August 1985 (age 41) Wollongong, New South Wales, Australia
- Height: 179 cm (5 ft 10 in)
- Weight: 93 kg (14 st 9 lb)

Playing information
- Position: Fullback, Halfback, Five-eighth
Club
Years	Team	Pld	T	G	FG	P
2004	South Sydney	2	0	0	0	0
2008–09	Wests Tigers	19	4	0	0	16
2010–11	Crusaders RL	30	17	0	0	68
2012–18	Widnes Vikings	174	87	110	1	569
	Total	225	108	110	1	653
- Source: As of 12 August 2018

Rhys Hanbury (born 27 August 1985) is an Australian former professional rugby league footballer who last played for the Widnes Vikings in the Super League.

He previously played for the Wests Tigers in the National Rugby League (NRL).

Hanbury primarily plays at fullback and can also operate as a halfback. He played junior football with Illawarra Wests.

Although he was expected to make his début for Crusaders against Wigan Warriors on 5 February at the DW Stadium, visa issues made him unavailable until 11 April match versus Wakefield Trinity.

== South Sydney Rabbitohs ==
Rhys made his first grade début for the South Sydney Rabbitohs against Penrith Panthers. He made just two appearances for the club, partaking in a loss and a draw. He was released and transferred to Wests Tigers in NRL 2008.

== Wests Tigers ==
Rhys made his Wests Tigers début in a Round 2 fixture against North Queensland Cowboys. Star Benji Marshall was injured the round before but Hanbury nevertheless helped the Tigers to an emphatic 30-10 win. Hanbury made nineteen further appearances over the 2008 & 2009 seasons and in these appearances went over the try line four times. However the Tigers failed to make the NRL Finals both times and Hanbury signed for Crusaders for the 2010 season.

== Crusaders RL ==
Hanbury enjoyed a successful Crusaders season in 2010. First picked on the bench against Wakefield Trinity, he scored his first two tries against York City Knights in the Carnegie Challenge Cup. Hanbury would finish the 2010 season joint top scorer with 12 tries; yet he had only twenty appearances, four less than joint top scorer Vince Mellars.

His 2011 season did not go to plan however. Plagued with injuries, he made just ten appearances with four tries. It was announced that he would move to Widnes for the 2012 season alongside team mates Lloyd White and Frank Winterstein after the Welsh club's withdrawal from Super League.

== Widnes Vikings ==
Hanbury débuted for the Widnes Vikings in the first game of the season against Wakefield Trinity. An impressive kick put Willie Isa through to score but the video referee spotted a pull on Peter Fox by Patrick Ah Van and disallowed the try. Widnes would eventually lose the game. Rhys Hanbury scored consecutive points in rounds two and three - a goal against Salford Red Devils and a try against newly crowned World Club Challenge champions Leeds Rhinos. Hanbury helped Widnes to a 38-30 win over the London Broncos with his second Widnes try. His third was a consolation in a 38-4 defeat by the Bradford Bulls.

== Career highlights ==
- First Grade Debut: 2004 - Round 9, South Sydney Rabbitohs vs Penrith Panthers, 16 March
- Wests Tigers Debut: 2008 - Wests Tigers vs North Queensland Cowboys, Round 2
- First Try: 2008 - Wests Tigers
- Crusaders Debut: 2010 - Crusaders vs Wakefield Trinity
- Widnes Debut: 2012 - Widnes vs Wakefield Trinity, Round 1
