= Tom Gilmore (rugby league) =

English rugby league footballer

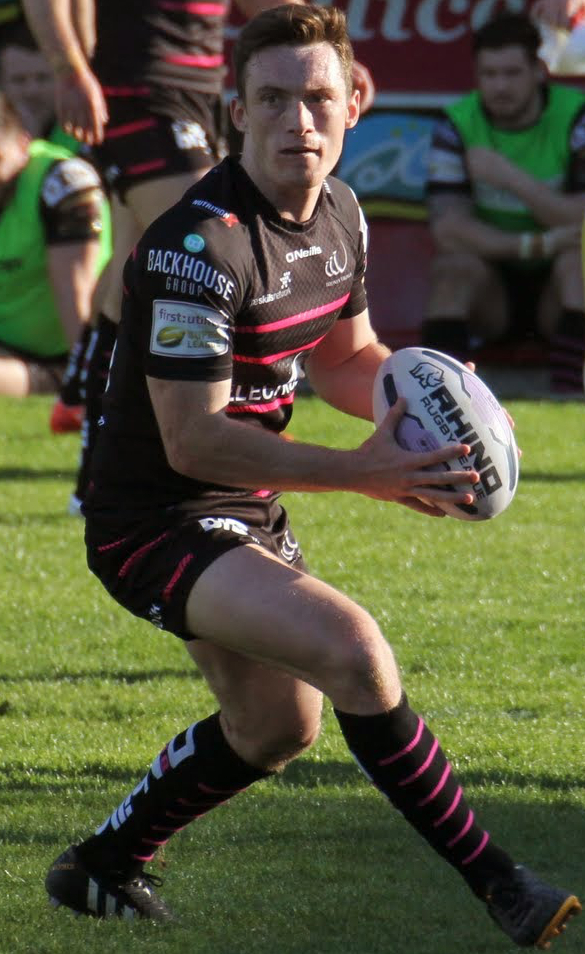

Personal information
- Full name: Thomas Gilmore
- Born: 2 February 1994 (age 31) St Helens, Merseyside, England
- Height: 5 ft 8 in (1.72 m)
- Weight: 12 st 4 lb (78 kg)

Playing information
- Position: Scrum-half, Stand-off
Club
Years	Team	Pld	T	G	FG	P
2012–19	Widnes Vikings	58	15	73	3	209
2014(DR)	→ N Wales Crusaders	2	1	0	0	4
2015(loan)	→ London Broncos	15	4	0	0	16
2020	Halifax	2	0	0	0	0
2020(loan)	→ Salford Red Devils	2	1	0	0	4
2021–22	Batley Bulldogs	56	10	181	2	404
2023–	Widnes Vikings	72	7	162	7	399
	Total	207	38	416	12	1036
- Source: As of 7 February 2023

Tom Gilmore (born 2 February 1994) is a rugby league footballer who plays as a scrum-half or stand-off for the Widnes Vikings in the Championship.

He played for the Widnes Vikings in the Super League and the Championship, and on loan from Widnes at the North Wales Crusaders and the London Broncos in the Championship. Gilmore has also played for Halifax in the Championship, and on loan from 'Fax at the Salford Red Devils in the Super League.

== Background ==
Gilmore was born in Widnes, Cheshire, England.

== Career ==
=== Widnes Vikings ===
He made his début as a substitute in the victory against the London Broncos in 2012, but his first starting appearance had to wait until April 2013 against the Huddersfield Giants.

On 26 February 2015 Gilmore joined the Broncos on a one-month loan deal.

=== Halifax ===
On 25 September 2020 it was announced that Gilmore would join Salford on loan.

=== Batley Bulldogs ===
On 17 November 2020 it was announced that Gilmore would join the Batley Bulldogs for the 2021 season.

=== Widnes Vikings (re-join) ===
On 10 October 2022 it was announced that Gilmore had re-joined the Widnes Vikings on a two-year deal.

== International career ==
In July 2018 he was selected in the England Knights Performance squad.
