= James Chapelhow =

English rugby league footballer

Jay Chapelhow
Personal information
- Full name: James Chapelhow
- Born: 21 September 1995 (age 30) Runcorn, Cheshire, England
- Height: 6 ft 1 in (1.86 m)
- Weight: 17 st 5 lb (110 kg)

Playing information
- Position: Prop
Club
Years	Team	Pld	T	G	FG	P
2015–20	Widnes Vikings	82	11	0	0	44
2015(loan)	→ Whitehaven	4	0	0	0	0
2016(loan)	→ Whitehaven	6	2	0	0	8
2021–23	Newcastle Thunder	55	9	0	0	36
2024–25	Oldham RLFC	45	4	0	0	16
2026–	Widnes Vikings	0	0	0	0	0
	Total	192	26	0	0	104
- Source: As of 6 October 2025
- Relatives: Ted Chapelhow (brother)

James "Jay" Chapelhow (born 21 September 1995) is an English professional rugby league footballer who plays as a prop for the Widnes Vikings in the RFL Championship.

== Background ==
Chapelhow was born in Runcorn, Cheshire, England.

== Career ==
=== Widnes Vikings ===
Chapelhow made his senior début on loan at Whitehaven. In total, he played four games for the Cumbrian club. His début for parent club Widnes Vikings came in a Super League Super 8s qualifier against Leigh Centurions on 27 September 2015.

=== Ottawa Aces ===
On 10 Aug 2020 it was announced that Jay, along with his twin brother Ted, had signed for Ottawa Aces.

=== Newcastle Thunder ===
Due to Ottawa Aces' deferred competition start date, Chapelhow, again with his twin brother, both instead signed up for Newcastle Thunder on 24 Dec 2020.

=== Oldham RLFC ===
On 6 October 2023 it was reported that he had signed for Oldham RLFC on a two-year deal.

=== Widnes Vikings (re-join) ===
On 5 October 2025 it was reported that he had re-joined Widnes Vikings on a two-year deal.
