= Danny Craven (rugby league) =

English rugby league footballer

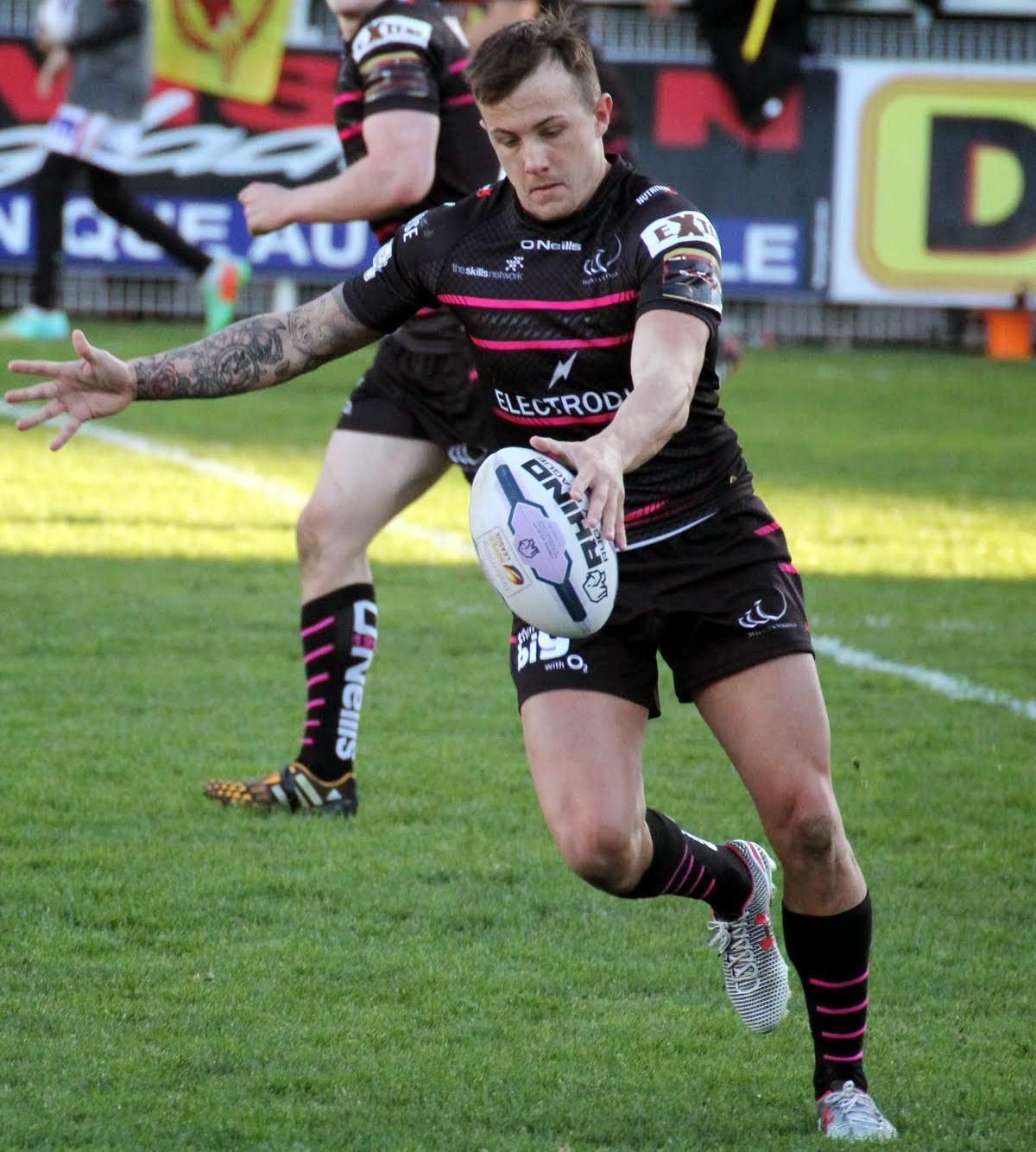

Personal information
- Full name: Daniel Craven
- Born: 21 November 1991 (age 34) St Helens, Merseyside, England
- Height: 5 ft 10 in (1.78 m)
- Weight: 14 st 13 lb (95 kg)

Playing information
- Position: Stand-off, Scrum-half, Fullback
Club
Years	Team	Pld	T	G	FG	P
2010–23	Widnes Vikings	179	64	41	6	344
2013(DR)	→ Workington Town	4	3	0	0	12
2015(DR)	→ Whitehaven	2	1	0	0	4
2015(loan)	→ Halifax	6	2	2	0	12
2016(loan)	→ Featherstone Rovers	24	8	4	1	49
2024–25	Oldham RLFC	34	15	7	2	76
2025	Sheffield Eagles	9	2	1	0	10
2026–	Midlands Hurricanes	0	0	0	0	0
	Total	258	95	55	9	507
- Source: As of 26 September 2025

Danny Craven (born 21 November 1991) is a rugby league footballer who plays as a stand-off, scrum-half or fullback for the Midlands Hurricanes.

== Background ==
Craven was born in St Helens, Merseyside, England.

== Career ==
=== Widnes Vikings ===
He made his début against Whitehaven RLFC in 2010. Rejoined Widnes for the 2021 season.

=== Oldham RLFC ===
On 13 October 2023 it was reported that he had signed for Oldham RLFC for the 2024 season on a permanent 2-year deal.

=== Sheffield Eagles ===
On 11 July 2025 it was reported that he had signed for Sheffield Eagles in the RFL Championship

=== Midlands Hurricanes ===
On 26 September 2025 it was reported that he had signed for Midlands Hurricanes in the RFL League 1
