= Ryan Ince =

English rugby league footballer

Personal information
- Born: 16 September 1996 (age 29) Widnes, Cheshire, England
- Height: 6 ft 1 in (1.85 m)
- Weight: 14 st 11 lb (94 kg)

Playing information
- Position: Wing
Club
Years	Team	Pld	T	G	FG	P
2016–19	Widnes Vikings	46	31	0	0	124
2016(loan)	→ Whitehaven	16	1	0	0	4
2017(loan)	→ Hunslet	9	5	0	0	20
2018(loan)	→ North Wales Crusaders	1	0	0	0	0
2020	Leigh Centurions	0	0	0	0	0
2020(loan)	→ Oldham	2	1	0	0	4
2021	Oldham	20	1	0	0	4
2022–	Widnes Vikings	86	54	0	0	56
	Total	180	93	0	0	212
- Source: As of 1 January 2023

Ryan Ince (born 16 September 1996) is an English professional rugby league footballer who plays on the wing for Widnes Vikings in the RFL Championship.

He played for the Widnes Vikings in the Super League and in the Championship. He has also spent time on loan from Widnes at Whitehaven in the Championship and Hunslet and the North Wales Crusaders in League 1. Ince has also spent time on loan from the Leigh Centurions at Oldham in the RFL Championship.

== Background ==
Ryan Ince was born in Widnes, Cheshire, England.

== Playing career ==
=== Widnes Vikings ===
He graduated from the Widnes Vikings Academy system and played his junior rugby league for the Widnes Moorfield club. He has represented England at youth team level.

He made his début for Whitehaven, whilst on loan at the club in the Championship in 2016. In 2016, he made his Widnes Vikings début against Hull FC.

=== Leigh Centurions ===
On 24 February 2020, it was announced that Ince had signed for Oldham on loan.

=== Oldham RLFC ===
On 19 November 2020, it was announced that Ince would join Oldham for the 2021 season on a one-year deal.

=== Widnes Vikings (re-join) ===
On 27 September 2021, it was reported that he had signed for Widnes in the RFL Championship.
