= Lloyd White (rugby league) =

Wales international rugby league footballer

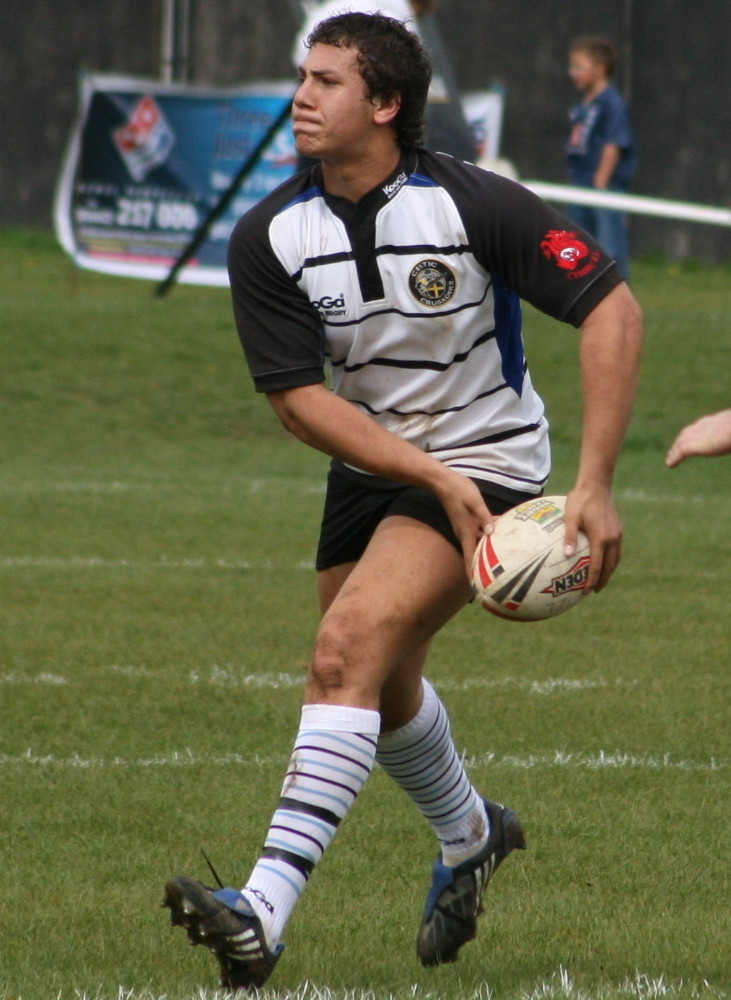

Personal information
- Full name: Lloyd Vivian F. White
- Born: 9 August 1988 (age 38) Cardiff, Wales
- Height: 6 ft 0 in (1.83 m)
- Weight: 15 st 4 lb (97 kg)

Playing information
- Position: Hooker, Stand-off
Club
Years	Team	Pld	T	G	FG	P
2009–11	Crusaders RL	32	11	0	0	44
2010(DR)	→ South Wales Scorpions	13	7	45	0	118
2012–18	Widnes Vikings	147	39	45	1	247
2020–22	Toulouse Olympique	18	5	0	1	21
	Total	210	62	90	2	430
Representative
Years	Team	Pld	T	G	FG	P
2009–16	Wales	15	4	23	0	62

Coaching information
Representative
Years	Team	Gms	W	D	L	W%
2025–	Wales A	0	0	0	0
- Source: As of 3 October 2025

Lloyd White (born 9 August 1988) is a Welsh international rugby league footballer who last played as a hooker for Toulouse Olympique in the Championship. He is now head coach of Wales A

He has previously played for Crusaders RL and spent time playing for the South Wales Scorpions. He played as a stand-off earlier in his career.

== Background ==
White was born in Cardiff, Wales. He is of Jamaican heritage.

== Playing career ==
=== Crusaders ===
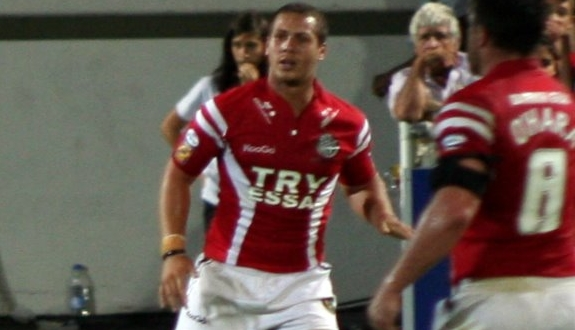
White playing for the Crusaders against the Catalans Dragons in 2009

White made six appearances for Crusaders in his début season of 2009. Following the demise of Crusaders, White joined Widnes, starting in 2012.

=== South Wales Scorpions ===
He spent some time on loan at the South Wales Scorpions in 2010.

=== Widnes Vikings ===
On 1 May 2014, White committed to the Vikings on a new two-year deal.

=== Toulouse Olympique ===
On 5 November 2019, Toulouse announced that they had signed Lloyd White from Australian side Mackay Cutters for the 2020 season.

In June 2020, shortly before the 2020 Championship season was abandoned due to Covid 19, White announced that he had extended his contract with Toulouse for the 2021 season with an option for 2022.

On 14 October 2021, Toulouse announced that White had extended his contract until the end of the 2022 season.

== International career ==
White has represented his native Wales at international level in 2009, making his début in the 42–12 win over Ireland in the European Cup, and going on to play in the final winning team against Scotland, scoring a try in a 28–16 win.

White was named the Wales player of the year in 2011 at the RLIF awards.

In September 2015, John Kear named White as the Wales national team captain for the 2015 European Cup tournament. On 12 October, however, he required surgery on an injured knee so he therefore withdrew from the squad.

In October 2016, White played for Wales in the 2017 World Cup qualifiers.

He was selected in the Wales 9s squad for the 2019 Rugby League World Cup 9s.

In 2021, White was named in the train-on squad for the Jamaica national rugby league team ahead of the 2021 Rugby League World Cup.

== Coaching career ==
On 2 October 2025 he was announced as head-coach of the Wales 'A' side
