= Adam Lawton =

English rugby league footballer

Personal information
- Born: 13 June 1993 (age 33) Widnes, Cheshire, England
- Height: 6 ft 7 in (2.01 m)
- Weight: 17 st 9 lb (112 kg)

Playing information
- Position: Second-row, Prop
Club
Years	Team	Pld	T	G	FG	P
2013–14	Widnes Vikings	15	9	0	0	36
2014(loan)	→ North Wales Crusaders	3	2	0	0	8
2019–20	Salford Red Devils	4	0	0	0	0
2019(loan)	→ Rochdale Hornets	8	4	0	0	16
2019(loan)	→ Swinton Lions	4	0	0	0	0
2020(loan)	→ Newcastle Thunder	4	2	0	0	0
2021–23	Widnes Vikings	44	20	0	0	80
2024–25	Oldham RLFC	5	7	0	0	28
2026–	Widnes Vikings	0	0	0	0	0
	Total	87	44	0	0	168
- Source: As of 2 November 2026

Adam Lawton (born 13 June 1993) is an English professional rugby league footballer who plays for the Widnes Vikings in the RFL Championship, as a prop or second-row.

He played for the Widnes Vikings in the Super League, and on loan from Widnes at the North Wales Crusaders in the Championship. Lawton has spent time on loan from Salford at the Rochdale Hornets and the Swinton Lions in the Betfred Championship.

== Background ==
Lawton was born in Widnes, Cheshire, England.

== Career ==
=== Widnes Vikings ===
Lawton made his début in 2013, and scored nine tries in 12 appearances during his first season with the club. In July 2014, he was granted a sabbatical from his contract with Widnes in order to "take an extended break to Australia".

=== Widnes Vikings (rejoined) ===
On 27 December 2020 it was reported that Lawton would re-join Widnes Vikings for the 2021 season on a one-year deal.

=== Oldham RLFC ===
On 18 October 2023 it was reported that Lawton had signed a two-year deal with Oldham RLFC for the 2024 season.

=== Widnes Vikings ===
On 10 July 2025 it was reported that he had re-joined Widnes Vikings in the RFL Championship on a 1-year deal.
