= Jack Owens (rugby league) =

English rugby league footballer

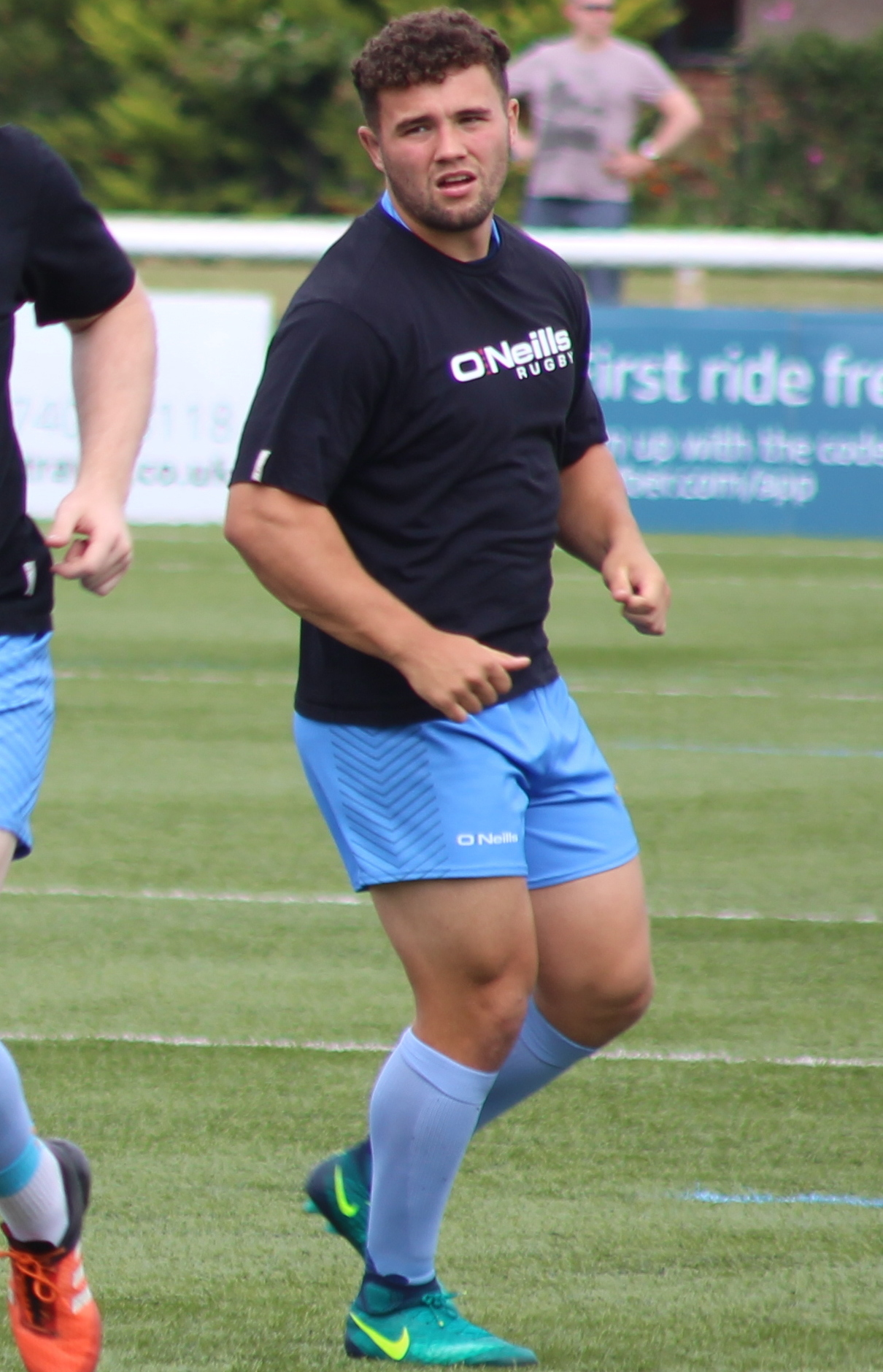

Personal information
- Born: 3 June 1994 (age 32) Widnes, Cheshire, England
- Height: 5 ft 10 in (1.78 m)
- Weight: 14 st 11 lb (94 kg)

Playing information
- Position: Fullback, Wing
Club
Years	Team	Pld	T	G	FG	P
2011–15	Widnes Vikings	63	27	120	0	348
2015 (loan)	→ Whitehaven	1	0	0	0	0
2016–17	St Helens	33	8	14	0	60
2017(loan)	→ Sheffield Eagles	17	5	26	0	72
2018	Leigh Centurions	26	10	22	0	84
2019–26	Widnes Vikings	161	67	218	1	705
	Total	301	117	400	1	1269
- Source: As of 15 September 2026

Jack Owens (born 3 June 1994) is an English professional rugby league footballer who last played as a goal-kicking fullback or wing for the Widnes Vikings in the Championship.

== Background ==
Owens was born in Ditton, a residential area of Widnes, Cheshire, England.

== Career ==
Having previously played for the Widnes Vikings, he was released from the club on 27 October 2015. His début for the Vikings came in a Challenge Cup match against Siddal and his league début was against Barrow Raiders in May 2011. He officially joined St. Helens in November 2015, for the 2016 season.

During the 2017 season the fullback joined Championship side Sheffield Eagles on a loan spell that lasted until the end of the season.

He joined newly relegated Leigh Centurions in the Championship ahead of the 2018 season having been released by the Saints.

On 15 September 2026 it was reported that he would leave Widnes Vikings at the end of the 2026 season
