= Kevin Brown (rugby league, born 1984) =

England international rugby league footballer

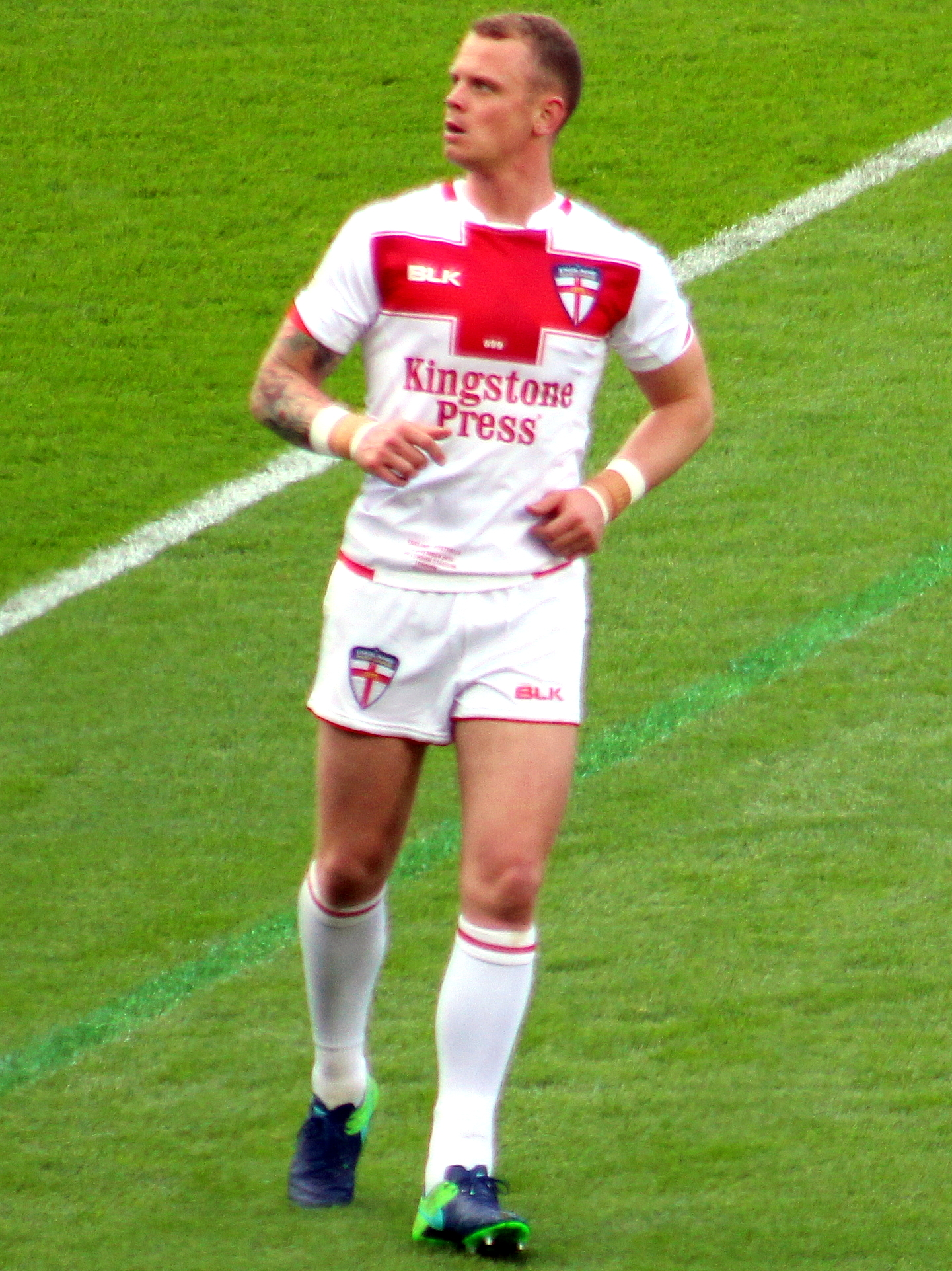

Personal information
- Full name: Kevin John Brown
- Born: 11 October 1984 (age 41) St Helens, Merseyside, England

Playing information
- Height: 6 ft 0 in (1.83 m)
- Weight: 13 st 9 lb (87 kg)
- Position: Stand-off, Centre, Scrum-half, Loose forward
Club
Years	Team	Pld	T	G	FG	P
2003–06	Wigan Warriors	73	31	0	0	124
2006–12	Huddersfield Giants	172	51	1	1	207
2013–16	Widnes Vikings	97	51	1	1	207
2017–19	Warrington Wolves	55	18	0	0	72
2019(loan)	→ Leigh Centurions	3	2	0	0	8
2020–21	Salford Red Devils	22	6	1	0	26
	Total	422	159	3	2	644
Representative
Years	Team	Pld	T	G	FG	P
2010–17	England	10	1	0	0	4

Kevin John Brown (born 11 October 1984) is a former English professional rugby league footballer who last played as a stand-off for the Salford Red Devils in the Super League. He has played for England at international level.

He played as a centre for the Wigan Warriors, and captained both the Huddersfield Giants and the Widnes Vikings in the Super League. He played for the Warrington Wolves in the top flight, and on loan from Warrington at the Leigh Centurions in the 2019 Betfred Championship.

== Club career ==
=== Early career ===
Born in St Helens, Brown played junior rugby for several teams, including Thatto Heath Crusaders, Haydock Warriors, Pilkington Recs and Blackbrook. Although he initially struggled to impress scouts, he was signed by Wigan Warriors at the age of 16. Brown played for Wigan's academy side in 2002 and 2003.

Brown was called up into the 2002 England Academy squad that beat the Australian Schoolboys in winter 2002. He had originally been included in the stand-by squad, but got his chance following the failure of Hull centre Kirk Yeaman to recover from a shoulder injury.

Brown was also selected for the Super League U21s squad to face the National League U21s in June 2003. Shortly afterwards, Wigan acknowledged the player's tremendous potential by extending his contract until the end of 2005. Wigan coach Stuart Raper commented: "I am delighted Kevin has re-signed as he is a big part of my future plans."

=== Wigan Warriors ===
In April 2003, due to a significant number of first team injuries, Brown was one of several academy players to make their senior début against his hometown team St. Helens, appearing as a substitute in a 24–22 victory over St Helens. He scored his first tries later in the season with a hat-trick against Halifax.

Brown became a first team regular during the 2004's Super League IX, playing almost every game until he fractured his fibula (leg bone) in a match against the Wakefield Trinity Wildcats. Despite injury and shaky form, he signed a new deal in July 2005 keeping him at the Wigan Warriors until the end of the 2007's Super League XII.

Newly appointed head coach Ian Millward commented: "Kevin is still only 20 and a very exciting player. He is still improving and as he gets better, which I am sure he will, he will be an important part of our attack."

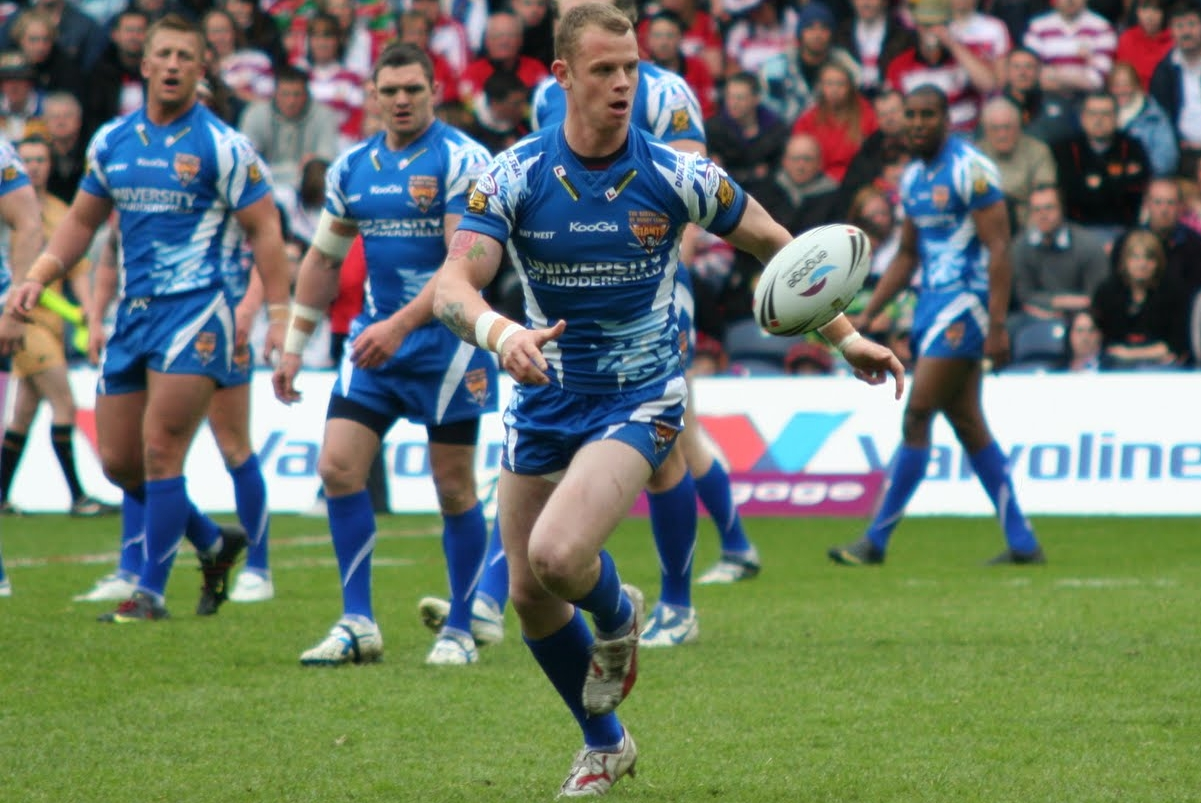
Brown playing for Huddersfield

=== Huddersfield Giants ===
In June 2006, Brown joined Huddersfield Giants on loan until the end of the season.

On 19 August 2006, Brown made the deal permanent, signing a three-year contract with the club. In 2009, Brown signed a new three-year contract, keeping him at the club until 2012.

=== Widnes Vikings ===
In May 2012, it was announced that Brown had signed a four-year contract with Widnes from the 2013 season for an undisclosed fee. He was named at stand-off in the 2014 Super League Dream Team, and was the first ever Widnes player to be selected in the team. Brown was also named as captain for the 2015 season following the retirement of previous captain Jon Clarke.

=== Warrington Wolves ===
In December 2016 it was announced that Brown had signed a two-year contract with Warrington Wolves for an undisclosed fee.

He played in the 2018 Challenge Cup Final defeat by the Catalans Dragons at Wembley Stadium.

He played in the 2018 Super League Grand Final defeat by the Wigan Warriors at Old Trafford.

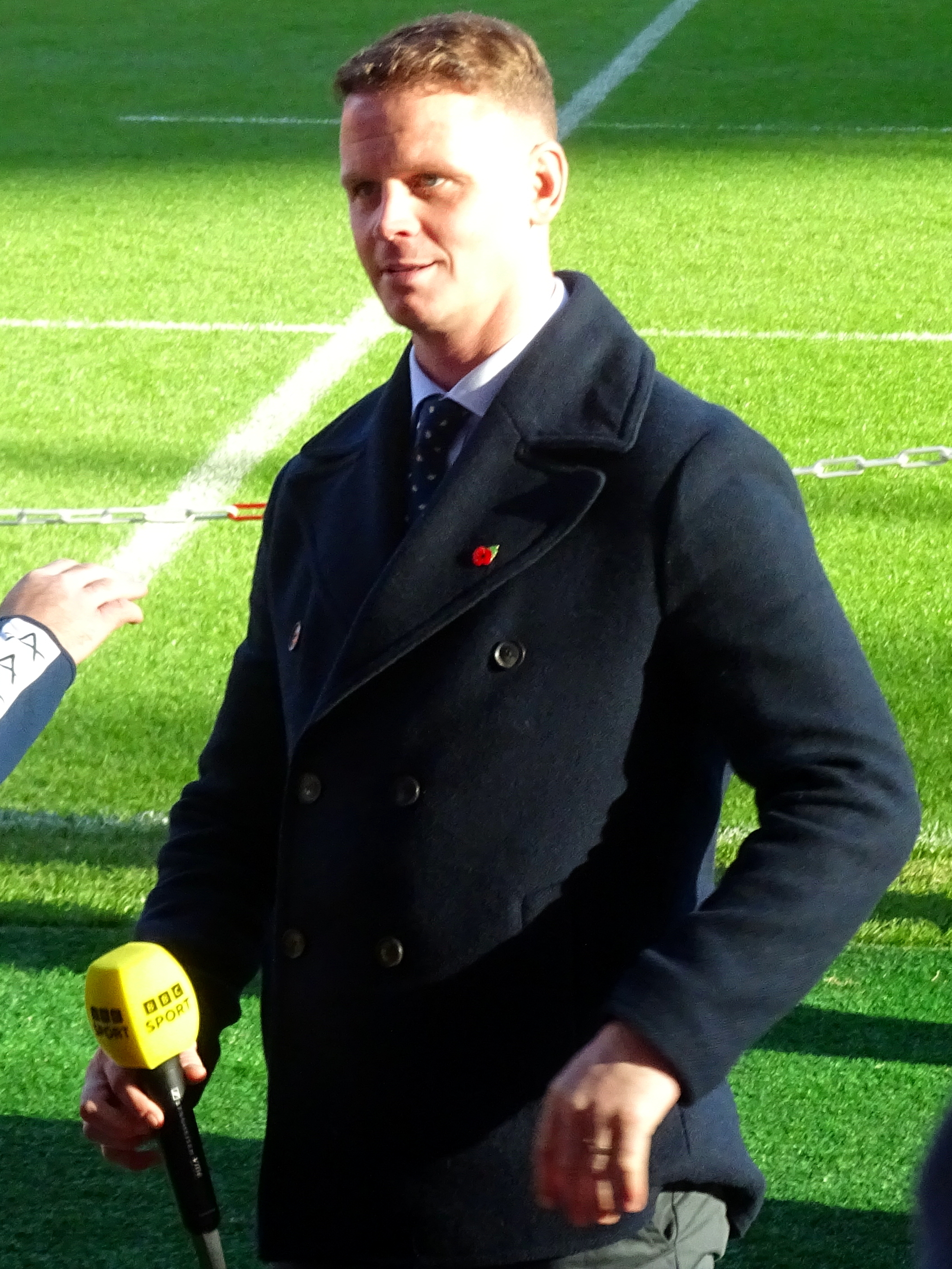
Brown working as a pundit for the BBC at the 2021 RLWC

=== Leigh Centurions ===
Brown spent time on loan from Warrington at the Leigh Centurions in 2019.

=== Salford ===
On 17 October 2020, he played in the 2020 Challenge Cup Final defeat for Salford against Leeds at Wembley Stadium.

In round 4 of the 2021 Super League season, he scored two tries in a 34-8 victory over Leigh. It was Salford's first win of the year after the club had lost the opening three games.

== International career ==
In June 2007 Brown was called up to the Great Britain squad for the Test match against France.

He was selected to play for England against France in the one-off test in 2010. He was also a part of England's Four Nations campaign later in the year.

In October 2016, Brown was selected in the England squad for the 2016 Four Nations. He returned to the international scene where he featured in a test match against France, scoring his first international try in the process, in his country's 40-6 win.

Brown was a surprise inclusion in England's 2017 World Cup squad. He was not selected for the first two group games, with Gareth Widdop and Luke Gale being preferred as the starting halfbacks. Brown has given his first start in the final group game against France, with Widdop moving to the fullback position. He retained his place for the 36–6 quarter final victory over Papua New Guinea, but was substituted at half time after suffering a concussion. He was cleared to play in time for the semi-final against Tonga, helping England win 20–18 to reach the World Cup final for the first time in 22 years. Brown started once again at stand off in the final against Australia, which England went on to lose 0–6.

== Post-playing career ==
Brown has worked as a pundit for the BBC since hanging up his boots.
