= Widnes Vikings =

English rugby league club

Club information
- Full name: Widnes Vikings Rugby League Football Club
- Nickname(s): The Chemics; The Vikings
- Short name: Widnes Vikings
- Colours: White and Black
- Founded: 1875; 151 years ago
- Website: widnesvikings.co.uk

Current details
- Ground: DCBL Stadium Widnes, Cheshire (13,350)
- Chairman: Stuart Murphy
- Coach: Allan Coleman
- Competition: RFL Championship
- 2026 season: 5th (Sudden Death)
- Current season

Uniforms
Home colours	Away colours

Records
- Championships: 3 (1978, 1988, 1989)
- Challenge Cups: 7 (1930, 1937, 1964, 1975, 1979, 1981, 1984)
- Other top-tier honours: 20
- Most capped: 591 – Keith Elwell
- Highest points scorer: 2,195 – Ray Dutton

The Widnes Vikings are an English rugby league club in Widnes, Cheshire, which competes in the RFL Championship. The club plays home matches at DCBL Stadium. Founded as Widnes Football Club, they are one of the original twenty-two rugby clubs that formed the Northern Rugby Football Union in 1895. Their historic nickname is "The Chemics" after the main industry in Widnes, but now they use their modern nickname, "The Vikings".

The club enjoyed a period of success in the 1970s, 1980s, and early 1990s, and were frequently described as "Cup Kings" reaching the Challenge Cup Final 7 times in 10 years between 1975 and 1984. In 1989, after winning their third Rugby League Premiership, Widnes became the first official World Club Champions by beating the Australian champions Canberra Raiders 30–18 at Old Trafford. They have a strong local rivalry with Warrington Wolves.

== History ==
=== Early years ===
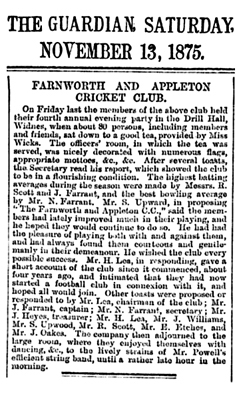
A newspaper extract from the Widnes Guardian in 1875 announcing the formation of Farnworth & Appleton Football Club.

The Farnworth & Appleton Cricket Club was formed in 1871 and four years later the members decided to embrace the burgeoning football code. At their fourth annual evening party in the Drill Hall, Widnes, in November 1875, club Chairman Henry Lea "gave a short account of the club since it commenced about four years ago, and indicated that they had now started a football club in connexion (sic) with it, and hoped all would join". The first known game for the new Farnworth and Appleton FC was in Widnes in January 1876 played under rugby rules against Northwich Victoria. A few weeks later a return match was played at Drill Field, Northwich under soccer rules. Vics won both games. These are the only two known fixtures in that truncated first season.

By May 1876 the club had changed its name to Widnes FC and the cricket side of the organisation had disbanded, presumably to concentrate on football activities. By the late 1870s the club was being referred to as "The Chemicals"—subsequently shortened to 'The Chemics'.

The first ground was on Albert Road behind what is now the Premier Wetherspoon's pub and a short spell followed in the Simms Cross area. From around 1878–84 the club were based at the junction of Millfield/Peelhouse Lane, apart from season 1880–81 when they played on the Widnes Cricket Club ground at Lowerhouse Lane. From 1884–95 they rented a field at Lowerhouse Lane before moving to their third separate site on that road in October 1895. The first ever game at what later became Naughton Park was against Liversedge on Saturday 12 October 1895.

In 1895, Widnes were founder members of the Northern Union which broke away from the Rugby Football Union. Their first game was an away fixture against Runcorn which they lost 15–4. During the early years, the club often had to sell players to balance the books. The strength of junior rugby league in the area meant the club had a steady stream of new players to offset any losses.

In 1902, the Lancashire and Yorkshire leagues were combined to form a second division, Widnes was added to the first division.

In 1914, Arthur 'Chick' Johnson was capped for the Lions (captained by Harold Wagstaff) in the famous Rorke's Drift test, a match in which they overcame all the odds, and injuries to beat Australia with a depleted side of 10 against 13. He scored an extraordinary try to win the game, dribbling the ball from inside his own half. Widnes closed for the 1915–16 season but recommenced playing in 1916 following the introduction of conscription which meant that would not be accused of keeping men from volunteering for the First World War. Thirteen Widnes players were killed during the conflict.

The club's first ever success came when they won the Lancashire League trophy in the 1919–20 season. However, the 1920s saw the club almost go to the wall. Local rivals Warrington donated their share of the traditional Easter and Christmas derby matches to keep Widnes afloat in 1927–28.

In 1930, Widnes with 12 local-born players defied the odds to beat St. Helens 10–3 to bring home the Challenge Cup.

The Kingsway housing scheme threatened the loss of Widnes' ground. After several years of fundraising during the Great Depression of the 1930s, £3,250 was raised to save the ground. This came with a stipulation that the ground could be sold only to the local council at the original price. The newly named Naughton Park was opened in 1932.

A major boost for the club was Widnes' first ever trip to the Challenge Cup final, staged at Wembley. Their opponents were St. Helens, Saints scored after six minutes to take a 3–0 lead, but Widnes hit back with a penalty try, a further try and a penalty to take a 10–3 half-time lead. A scoreless second half meant Widnes had won the cup.

Widnes became the first club to make two trips to Wembley, with a loss to Hunslet in the 1934 cup final.

In 1935–36, the team came close to being rugby league champions. Having finished third in the table, Widnes beat Liverpool 10–9 but lost to Hull FC, in the championship final. A third trip to Wembley came in 1937, with an 18–5 win over Keighley. The final was dubbed "McCue's Match" as the halfback played an important part in the win.

Widnes dropped out of the wartime Lancashire league in 1940–41 and did not return to league competition until 1945–46.

=== Post war ===
Tommy McCue led the club to its first ever Lancashire Cup win, with a 7–3 victory against Wigan in 1945.

Back at Wembley in 1950, the team was beaten 19–0 by Warrington. During this period, the club reverted to selling its players to richer teams.

Local man Vince Karalius joined Widnes from St. Helens in 1962 and was appointed club captain. In his first season, Widnes finished third in the Championship, which equaled the club's best league placing. In 1962, the league was split into East and West of the Pennines; Widnes and Workington Town met at Central Park, Wigan, in the first final of the Western Division Championship on Saturday 10 November 1962. With two minutes remaining, Lowdon dropped a goal to earn Workington a 9–9 draw. Later in the month Workington Town won the replay 10–0.

The following season saw him lead his team to Wembley, where Widnes were Rugby League Challenge Cup winners after they defeated Hull Kingston Rovers 13–5. No team had ever played more games in reaching Wembley than Widnes in 1964. In the first round, two replays were necessary before beating Leigh. Liverpool City were beaten in the second round, then Widnes played Swinton in front of 19,000 at Naughton Park. A 5–5 draw meant another replay, which was a scoreless draw at Station Road. A second replay at Wigan was watched by 21,369 with Widnes winning 15–3. The semi-final against Castleford was drawn 7–7. A crowd of 28,732 spectators watched the replay, which Widnes won. A Wembley crowd of 84,488 saw Widnes win the Challenge Cup for the third time with a 13–5 victory over Hull Kingston Rovers. This was the Chemics first trophy success in eighteen years.

=== The "Cup Kings" ===
The 1970s saw the first really outstanding Widnes team. A host of young local players developed into the "Cup Kings", a golden age for the club. The first cup-final was a loss in the 1971–72 Lancashire Cup.

Six years after he retired from playing Vince Karalius returned to Widnes as coach; appointed in January 1972. The following two seasons, Widnes reached the finals of the BBC2 Floodlit Trophy. The first success came in the 1975 Lancashire Cup which Widnes won by beating Salford that season. They also won the 1975 Challenge Cup final 14–7 versus Warrington at Wembley. This was the first time in their history that Widnes had won two trophies in the same season. At his zenith, Karalius, stepped down once from his role as coach. He was replaced in May 1975 by Frank Myler.

Widnes visited Wembley in the following two seasons, losing to St. Helens and then Leeds. However, this was made up for by victories in the Lancashire Cup and John Player Trophy. The season after this (1977–78) saw their first league championship. The team went through the season unbeaten at home in the league. There were also trips to the John Player and Premiership finals.

Keith Elwell began his run of 242 consecutive appearances at Wembley in the 1976–77 Challenge Cup Final, including two as a substitute. He finished his run at Hull F.C. on 26 September 1982. This record for consecutive appearances for one club stands to this day.

Doug Laughton took over the job of team coach when Frank Myler retired from the position in 1978. The 1978–79 season saw no less than four cups come to Widnes—the BBC2 floodlit trophy, Lancashire Cup, Premiership and a win at Wembley over Wakefield Trinity in front of a crowd of 93,218. Widnes also defeated the Ashes-winning 1978 Kangaroo tourists.

The 1979–80 season saw Widnes beat Bradford Northern in the Premiership final, but come second to them in the league and John Player Trophy. The Lancashire Cup was won for the fifth time in the 1970s.

The 1980s started with a Wembley win over Hull Kingston Rovers in 1980–81. The season after this, Widnes again returned to Wembley, to face Hull F.C. Widnes led 14–6 with less than 20 minutes to go, but the game finished 14–14 and Hull won the replay 18–9 at Elland Road, Leeds. Widnes kept their record of winning a cup every season by defeating Hull 23–8 in the Premiership final. The next season saw Hull again beaten by Widnes in the Premiership final.

Vince Karalius returned to the club in March 1983 as co-coach with Harry Dawson. Dawson quit as coach in March 1984 with Karalius continuing as team manager. Karalius led a strong Widnes side to the finals of the Lancashire Cup and John Player Trophy and another Wembley victory appearance 19–6 against Wigan.

=== The "Greatest Team" ===
Doug Laughton returned to the club in January 1986 and began a series of signings of players from other league clubs and from rugby union. One such player was Martin Offiah, who in 1987–88 scored a club record 42 tries. The team went on to win the championship that season, clinching it with a 50-point win away over Hunslet. Widnes then beat St. Helens 38–14 in the Premiership Final at Old Trafford, Manchester a game in which Alan Tait made his début.

The 1988–89 season saw the club sign rugby union star Jonathan Davies from Llanelli for £225,000. Widnes and Wigan battled each other for the silverware. Widnes beat Wigan in the Charity Shield but lost to them in the Regal Trophy Final. The Championship came down to the last game of the season, a capacity crowd (officially 16,000) at Naughton Park saw Widnes beat Wigan 32–18 to win the title for the second year running. The Premiership was won again, with over 40,000 at Old Trafford to see Widnes beat Hull 18–10. Martin Offiah scored another 58 tries for Widnes, bringing up 100 tries for Widnes in just 76 games.

The 1989–90 season saw Widnes play at Anfield, Liverpool beating Wigan 27–22. Widnes beat St Esteve 60-6 to become European Club Champions to set up the first official World Club Challenge match against Australia's Grand Final winners. Canberra took a 12–0 lead but were then swept aside as Widnes stormed home 30–18 to become the first official World Club Champions.

Widnes continued to be competitive winning the Lancashire Cup against Salford (1991) and the Regal Trophy against Leeds (1992). Widnes were also runners up in the League Championship and Premiership (1991) and the Challenge Cup (1993). After losing 3 Challenge Cup semifinals in 1987, 1989 and 1991, this belated trip to Wembley in 1993 came too late to avert financial problems. To balance the books, over 25 first team players were sold to other teams. This resulted in the club sinking to 12th in the division one table, avoiding relegation.

Tony Myler became coach of Widnes in May 1994. In August 1995 the club decided to bring back Doug Laughton for a third stint as team manager which resulted in Myler's sacking as coach.

=== Summer era ===
In 1996, the first tier of British rugby league clubs played the inaugural Super League season and changed from a winter to a summer season. When the RFL announced that a new 12-team Super League was to be formed a chaotic period ensued in which the club was out, then in, then out, then in merged with local rivals Warrington and then finally out again as they finished below the cut-off point of 10th in the existing top flight.

The club adopted the name Widnes Vikings on 27 November 1996; the club had originally intended to adopt the moniker 'Warriors' but were asked to reconsider by the RFL, as Whitehaven were planning to adopt this name also. Further player and coaching departures ensued and the club struggled in the new first division, the club's first ever finish in the relegation zone followed. They spent the next five years in the Northern Ford Premiership.

Graeme West took over as coach after Doug Laughton's third stint, his reign lasted from May 1997 until August 1998. During this time, the playing arena was rebuilt and the old stands, terraces and facilities were demolished to be replaced with a state-of-the-art all-seater stadium and was also renamed from Naughton Park to the Halton Community Stadium. West was later replaced as coach by Colin Whitfield.

In 1999 Widnes narrowly missed out on a place in the Northern Ford Premiership Grand Final. The 2000 season was one of transition with head coach Colin Whitfield being sacked and replaced by David Hulme. A record attendance for the newly rebuilt stadium was set at 6,644 for a Northern Ford Premiership game against Leigh on Boxing Day 2000. Widnes finished off a poor season in 8th place in the NFP.

Under new coach Neil Kelly, Widnes won promotion to Super League in 2001 after beating Oldham 24–12 in the Northern Ford Premiership Grand Final.

Their début season in the Super League was in 2002, and the Vikings surprised everyone by narrowly missing out on a play-off place, and finishing seventh.

The following season saw them consolidate with a 9th place finish, and in 2004 they avoided relegation on the final day of the season, with Castleford's defeat by Wakefield Trinity saving Widnes' fate. Stuart Spruce was caretaker manager.

Frank Endacott arrived at Widnes as coach in 2005, but could not improve on the previous seasons. With two teams being relegated in 2005, due to the inclusion of Catalans Dragons in Super League from 2006 onwards, Widnes were relegated back down to the second tier of the English game (LHF National League 1).

Widnes parted company with coach Frank Endacott, and new coach Steve McCormack rebuilt the squad, which notably included Australian full back David Peachey, who kept his word to join the club, despite its relegation.

Stephen Vaughan completed a take-over of Widnes in 2006 and the club made it to the LHF National League Grand Final, but were beaten 29–16 by Hull Kingston Rovers at Warrington's Halliwell Jones Stadium.

Stephen Vaughan quit as chairman of Widnes at the start of 2007 and stepped down from the club's board of directors, placing the club's season into a 'boom or bust' scenario. Widnes won the 2007 Northern Rail Cup Final with a 54–6 victory over Whitehaven at Bloomfield Road stadium and went on to reach the National League Grand Final at the end of the season. They were beaten 42–10 by Castleford at Headingley and in the days that followed, Widnes had no option but to place themselves into voluntary administration.

=== New beginning ===
On 2 November 2007, Widnes were purchased by Steve O'Connor, a local business man who had just sold his haulage firm to the Stobart Group. Steve McCormack was re-appointed as Head Coach, and the club were re-admitted into National League 1. A nine-point deduction for going into administration was successfully neutralised through winning their first three games, and Widnes qualified for the National League One Playoffs by finishing in sixth place. A 32–16 defeat by third-placed Halifax however brought the nostalgic 2008 campaign to an end.

Off the field, Widnes had applied for a Super League licence for the 2009 season along with 18 other clubs. However, the club was not granted a licence to play in the Super League, with the recent financial history of the club coming under close scrutiny.

In 2009 Widnes parted company with Steve McCormack and for a period John Stankevitch became caretaker manager. Paul Cullen was unveiled as McCormack's eventual successor and managed the club to victory in the seasons Northern Rail Cup Final, beating a strong Barrow Raiders side 34–18.

In the following season, Widnes again reached the Northern Rail Cup Final but were beaten 25–24 by Batley Bulldogs. The club also reached the 2010 Co-operative Championship playoffs but were knocked out in the opening round by Barrow Raiders.

=== Return to Super League ===
In 2011 Widnes were granted a Super League licence for the 2012–14 seasons and Denis Betts was confirmed as the man who would coach the club. A flourish of new signings were announced and the pioneering 'Viking Stronghold' initiative moved from strength to strength. Widnes also installed a fourth generation artificial pitch (or ipitch as it became known) during the off season, making them the first team in modern day rugby league to not play on a traditional grass pitch. Widnes' tenancy in the Co-operative Championship culminated in September 2011 with a fifth place league finish, and a first round playoff defeat of 36–20 against Sheffield at Bramall Lane.

February 2012 saw Widnes' re-emergence into the top tier of rugby league, and they claimed their first two points against Wigan in a 37–36 win. The club managed to prove a number of critics wrong by gaining 12 points in total by the end of their first season back, but this was not enough to prevent the club from finishing at the bottom of the Super League table.

The 2013 season saw a marked improvement on the field by Widnes, with the team earning a total of 22 league points and finishing 10th in the Super League table.

The 2014 season proved to be the most successful season of the franchise period, with the club finishing eighth in the Super League table on 27 points and subsequently qualifying for the end of season play-offs for the first time in their history. A 22–19 away defeat by the Warrington Wolves brought the curtain down on a season that can only be seen as a success for the Vikings, with a Challenge Cup Semi-Final appearance against the Castleford being the key highlight. However, it was also during the 2014 season that the club received the news that "legendary supporter" Pat Price had died and condolences for 'the first lady of Rugby League' were received from clubs and supporters throughout the sport.

The RFL overhauled Super League for the 2015 season, scrapping the Franchise System and re-adopted promotion & relegation. Widnes finished in 9th position on 19 points, and then went on to consolidate their Super League status in the Middle 8's.

The 2016 season saw the Vikings put together a number of early strong performances, including defeating the previous season's champions Leeds 56–12. This placed Widnes top of the Super League table, heading into the Easter fixtures. Before the start of the 2017 season, Widnes sold team captain Kevin Brown to their bitter rivals Warrington. This move was completed whilst Brown was still in contract and, despite warnings from fans, proved the beginning of the end for Widnes as a potential mid-table team.

In 2017, the team finished bottom but avoided relegation by beating the Catalans Dragons and the Million Pound Game. The lack of ambition of the club was now available for everybody to see with Chairman Steven O’Connor washing his hands of the club and moving to Australia in order to pursue further business projects. This was done without O’Connor fulfilling his promise to the club and town that the club would not be entering Super League to “Make up the numbers”. The current board headed by James Rule failed to heed the mistakes of the 2017 season and further recruitment to the squad was extremely poor. This lack of ambition and value for money resulted in fans walking away from the club in their droves.

=== Relegation and financial problems ===
The 2018 season continued as the previous one with few quality signings and a team no longer good enough to compete in Super League. The club lost nineteen games in a row, which led to coach Denis Betts being dismissed with Francis Cummins taking interim charge; however, he could not prevent the club from falling into the Championship. On 1 February 2019, CEO James Rule resigned because the club faced significant financial challenges as a result of relegation. Speculation about the future of the club began to mount following a significant silence by the club's then chairman, Steve O’Connor.

The club went into administration on 22 February 2019 after a take-over bid failed; as a result of this development the Rugby Football League imposed a 12-point penalty on the club and their upcoming game against Sheffield was postponed. Following a fundraising campaign called "Vikings Quids In", supported by fans and other rugby league clubs, over £100,000 was raised. On 1 March 2019, the RFL accepted a takeover by a seven-strong consortium registered as Widnes Rugby League Club Limited, however the 12 point deduction remained in place leaving the club on minus 8 points. An investigation has begun to establish where large amounts of sponsorship and other funds have gone whilst the previous board were in charge. This may result in criminal proceedings against those responsible if any wrongdoing is discovered.

=== Vikings Resurgence ===
In March 2019, the club narrowly escaped liquidation, thanks in large part to crowdfunding pages setup by the remaining Widnes Vikings fans. Newly appointed Head Coach Kieron Purtill began leading the club in a moderately successful streak of wins, culminating in reaching the finals of the 2019 RFL 1895 Cup against Sheffield Eagles. In the 2022 RFL Championship season, Widnes finished seventh on the table and missed the playoffs.

== Grounds ==
The club's home ground is Halton Stadium. The club had a number of grounds before settling at Lowerhouse Lane in 1895. The death of the club's secretary, Tom Naughton in 1932, led to the ground on Lowerhouse Lane being renamed Naughton Park as a gesture of the team's appreciation. Naughton Park became one of the best known Rugby League grounds in the country due to the success of the 'Chemics' in the 1970s, and 1980s. In the 1990s Halton Council in partnership with the Widnes agreed to build a new stadium on the existing site, which would provide a multi-purpose complex including a social club, conference facilities, recreational facilities and catering/function facilities and would be the new home venue for Widnes RLFC. The new stadium was officially opened on 2 November 1997 following the completion of phase 1 of a multimillion-pound redevelopment and was renamed the Halton Community Stadium. On 29 January 1999 Halton Borough Council took over responsibility for the entire stadium, both financially and managerially. This was necessary as the joint venture companies arrangements were not performing as expected.

The stadium reached completion with the opening of the East Stand in September 2005 and is an all-seater stadium which has a capacity of 13,500. It has also had the honour to have staged national finals and international fixtures. In August 2011, the stadium turf was removed and replaced with a third generation artificial pitch (or ipitch as it became known), in order to improve overall match performance and maximize the use of the club's facilities. The stadium's name has changed a number of times due to sponsorship purposes, with the latest name being the DCBL Stadium.

== Club jerseys ==
- Since promotion to Super League in 2002

Year	Home Design	Away Design	Kit Manufacturer	Main Jersey Sponsor
2002	White with Black Trim	Blue, White & Red	Kooga	Peel
2003	White with Black Trim	Black with White Trim	Kooga	Finnforest
2004	White with Black sleeve & Red Trim	Black with Purple Trim	Kooga	Finnforest
2005	White with Black & Red Trim	Grey	Kooga	Finnforest
2006	White with Black Trim	Black with White Trim	Kooga	Liverpool Capital of Culture 08
2007	White with Black Trim	Red with Black Trim	Kooga	Liverpool Capital of Culture 08
2008	White with Black Trim	White with Red Trim	Nike	Stobart
2009	White with Black Trim	Fluorescent Yellow with Black Trim	O'Neills	Stobart
2010	White with Black Trim and Red Stripe	Gold with Black Trim	O'Neills	Stobart
2011	White	Grey with Orange Trim	O'Neills	Stobart
2012	White with Black V & Black Trim	Red with White Trim	O'Neills	Stobart
2013	Kit 1: White with Black V Kit 2: Black with White V	Maltacourt Purple, Orange & Yellow	O'Neills	Stobart
2014	Black and White Hoops	Light Blue with Dark Blue sash	O'Neills	Maltacourt
2015	White with thin, black & Green "V"	Black with pink hoops	O'Neills	The Parcel Centre (Home) / Electrod UK (Away)
2016	Black with Grey tribal designs	White	O'Neills	Select Security
2017	White with Black from the Chest to neck	Green, Grey, Black, Red stripes	O'Neills	PlayCasinoGames.Com
2018	Black shoulders fade into Black & White stripes	Light Blue shoulders fade into White	O'Neills	Beat the scrum
2019	All Black with White Collar	Canberra Raiders Green	XBlades	Beat the scrum
2020	Black and White Stripes	Red	Oxen	Bristol Street Motors- Nissan Widnes
2021	Black and White Stripes	Red	Oxen	Bristol Street Motors- Nissan Widnes
2022	Mainly black with white and grey flashes at bottom	Turquoise	Oxen	Bristol Street Motors- Nissan Widnes
2023	Mainly black with white and grey flashes at bottom	Black with multi-coloured sleeves	Oxen	Bristol Street Motors- Nissan Widnes
2024	TBC	TBC	Ellgren	DCBL

=== Historic Jerseys ===
Widnes traditionally wore a black and white hooped jersey with white shorts. However, throughout their most dominant period of the 1970s, the club actually wore an all white jersey with 3/4 length sleeves and black shorts.

== 2027 squad ==
2027 Widnes Vikings Squad
First team squad			Coaching staff
(Australia) Max Banditt – PR; (England) Liam Bent – PR, LF; (England) Jay Chapelhow – PR; (England) Deacon Connolly – CE; (England) Joe Edge – CE, WG; (England) Matty Fleming – CE, FB; (Wales) Matty Fozard – HK; (England) Thomas Gilmore – SH, SO; (England) Nick Gregson – LF, SR	(England) Lewis Hall – LF, HK; (England) Jack Hansen – SH, FB, SO; (England) Ryan Ince – WG; (Australia) Byron Johnson – FB, CE; (England) Jordan Johnstone – HK, SH; (England) Danny Langtree – SR, LF, PR; (England) Adam Lawton – PR, SR; (England) Joe Lyons – SO, SH	(Australia) Morgan McWhirter – PR, LF, SR; (England) Daniel Murray – PR; (England) Dan Nixon – WG; (England) Danny Richardson – SH, SO; (England) Max Roberts – SR, CE; (England) Frank Sergent – WG; (England) Kieran Taylor – CE, SR; (England) Sam Wilde (vc) – SR, LF; (Australia) Liam Williams – CE	Head coach: Allan Coleman; Assistant coaches: Eddie Kilgannon; Tom Wood; Legend: (c) Captain(s); (vc) Vice-captain(s); Updated: Source(s): https://widnesvikings.co.uk/first-team/

== 2027 transfers ==
=== Gains ===
Player	From	Contract	Date
(Australia) Byron Johnson	Souths Logan Magpies	1 year (+1 optional year)	8 September 2026
(England) Jack Hansen	Rochdale Hornets	2 years	9 September 2026
(England) Dan Nixon	Rochdale Hornets	1 year	9 September 2026
(Australia) Liam Williams	Melbourne Storm	1 year (+1 optional year)	29 September 2026

=== Losses ===
Player	To	Contract	Date
(England) Nathan Connell	Bradford Bulls	2 years	4 September 2026
(Wales) Mike Butt	Salford	1 year	9 September 2026
(England) Jack Owens			14 September 2026
(England) Jack Houghton	Swinton Lions	1 year	29 October 2026

== Players ==
=== Club captains ===
Year		Captain		Vice Captain	League
2005	(England)	Terry O'Connor	(Australia)	Shane Millard	Super League X
2006	(England)	Terry O'Connor	(England)	Mark Smith	National League One
2007	(England)	Mark Smith	(Ireland)	Bob Beswick	National League One
2008	(England)	Mark Smith	(Ireland)	Bob Beswick	Co-operative Championship
2009	(England)	Mark Smith	(Australia)	Jim Gannon	Co-operative Championship
2010	(England)	Mark Smith	(Ireland)	Dave Allen	Co-operative Championship
2011	(Ireland)	Simon Finnigan	(England)	Chaz I'Anson	Co-operative Championship
2012	(England)	Jon Clarke	(England)	Shaun Briscoe	Super League XVII
2013	(England)	Jon Clarke	(England)	Kevin Brown	Super League XVIII
2014	(England)	Jon Clarke	(England)	Kevin Brown	Super League XIX
2015	(England)	Kevin Brown	(England)	Joe Mellor	Super League XX
2016	(England)	Kevin Brown	(England)	Joe Mellor	Super League XIX
2017	(England)	Joe Mellor	(Australia)	Rhys Hanbury	Super League XXII
2018	(England)	Joe Mellor	(Australia)	Rhys Hanbury	Super League XXIII
2019	(New Zealand)	Hep Cahill	(New Zealand)	Anthony Gelling	Championship
2020	(England)	Jack Owens	(England)	Unknown	Championship
2021	(England)	Jack Owens	(England)	Unknown	Championship
2022	(England)	Jack Owens	(England)	Danny Craven	Championship
2023	(England)	Jack Owens	(England)	Danny Craven	Championship
2024	(England)	Jack Owens	(Wales)	Rhodri Lloyd	Championship

== Coaches ==
=== Coaching register – since 1972 ===
- (England) Vince Karalius (Jan 1972 – May 1975)
- (England) Frank Myler (May 1975 – May 1978)
- (England) Doug Laughton (May 1978 – Mar 1983)
- (England) Harry Dawson & Colin Tyrer (Mar 1983 – May 1983)
- (England) Vince Karalius & Harry Dawson(May 1983 – May 1984)
- (England) Eric Hughes (Jun 1984 – Jan 1986)
- (England) Doug Laughton (Jan 1986 – May 1991)
- (England) Frank Myler (Jun 1991 – May 1992)
- (England) Phil Larder (May 1992 – May 1994)
- (England) Tony Myler (May 1994 – Aug 1995)
- (England) Doug Laughton (Aug 1995 – Aug 1996)
- (England) Bernard Long (Aug 1996 – May 1997)
- (New Zealand) Graeme West (May 1997 – Aug 1998)
- (England) Colin Whitfield (Aug 1998 – Mar 2000)
- (England) David Hulme (Mar 2000 – Mar 2001)
- (England) Neil Kelly (Mar 2001 – Jul 2004)
- (England) Stuart Spruce (Jul 2004 – Oct 2004)
- (New Zealand) Frank Endacott (Oct 2004 – Oct 2005)
- (Scotland) Steve McCormack (Oct 2005 – Feb 2009)
- (England) John Stankevitch (Feb 2009 – Mar 2009)
- (England) Paul Cullen (Mar 2009 – Nov 2010)
- (England) Denis Betts (Nov 2010 – May 2018)
- (England) Francis Cummins (May 2018 – Oct 2018)
- (England) Keiron Purtill (Nov 2018 – Oct 2019)
- (Australia) Tim Sheens (Oct 2019 – Oct 2020)
- (Ireland) Simon Finnigan (Nov 2020 – Apr 2022)
- (England) Ryan O'Brien (interim) (Apr 2022 – Jun 2022)
- (England) John Kear (Jul 2022 - June 2023)
- (England) Neil Belshaw (interim) (June 2023 - Sep 2023)
- (England) Allan Coleman (Oct 2023–Present)

== Seasons ==
=== Super League era ===
Season	League										Play-offs	Challenge Cup	Other competitions		Name	Tries	Name	Points
Season	Division	P	W	D	L	F	A	PD	Pts	Pos	Play-offs	Challenge Cup	Other competitions		Top try scorer		Top point scorer	
1996	Division One	20	9	1	10	413	447	-34	19	7th		SF						
1997	Division One	20	6	0	14	282	579	-297	12	10th		R5						
1998	Division One	30	9	1	20	601	862	-261	19	9th		R4						
1999	Northern Ford Premiership	28	21	0	7	792	415	+377	42	3rd	Lost in Preliminary Final	QF						
2000	Northern Ford Premiership	28	17	0	11	698	483	+215	34	8th		R4						
2001	Northern Ford Premiership	28	21	1	6	961	377	+584	43	2nd	Won in Final	R4						
2002	Super League	28	14	1	13	590	716	-126	29	7th		R5						
2003	Super League	28	12	1	15	640	727	-87	25	9th		QF						
2004	Super League	28	7	0	21	466	850	-384	14	11th		R4						
2005	Super League	28	6	1	21	598	1048	-450	13	11th		QF						
2006	National League One	18	14	0	4	729	449	+280	28	2nd	Lost in Final	R4						
2007	National League One	18	16	0	2	740	220	+520	50	2nd	Lost in Final	R5	Championship Cup	W				
2008	National League One	18	10	2	6	453	410	+43	30	6th		R5						
2009	Championship	20	11	0	9	649	438	+211	39	4th	Lost in Semi Final	R4	Championship Cup	W				
2010	Championship	20	11	0	9	619	488	+131	38	5th	Lost in Elimination Playoffs	R5	Championship Cup	RU				
2011	Championship	20	11	1	8	555	532	+23	38	5th (Note: Promoted through licensing)	Lost in Elimination Playoffs	R5						
2012	Super League	27	6	0	21	532	1082	-550	12	14th		R4						
2013	Super League	27	10	2	15	695	841	-146	22	10th		QF						
2014	Super League	27	13	1	13	611	725	-114	27	8th	Lost in Elimination Playoffs	SF						
2015	Super League	23	9	1	13	518	565	-47	19	9th		QF						
2015	The Qualifiers	7	5	0	2	232	70	+162	10	2nd		QF						
2016	Super League	30	12	0	18	603	643	-40	24	7th		QF						
2017	Super League	23	5	1	17	359	632	-273	11	12th		R6						
2017	The Qualifiers	7	5	0	2	188	96	+92	10	2nd		R6						
2018	Super League	23	3	0	20	387	653	-266	6	12th		R6						
2018	The Qualifiers	7	1	0	6	92	173	-81	2	7th		R6						
2019	Championship	27	14	0	13	646	586	+60	16	11th		R6	1895 Cup	RU				
2020	Championship (Note: The 2020 Championship was abandoned due to the COVID-19 pandemic in the United Kingdom. Statistics shown are those at time of abandonment and are not official.)	5	3	0	3	128	93	+35	6	5th		R6						
2021	Championship	21	9	1	11	494	534	-40	19	8th		R6 (Note: Officially round 3 due to the competitions temporary restructure in 2021.)	1895 Cup	SF				
2022	Championship	27	12	0	15	567	679	-112	24	8th		R4						
2023	Championship	27	13	0	14	619	654	-35	26	9th		R4						
2024	Championship	26	14	1	11	551	475	+76	29	5th	Lost in Elimination play-off	R5	1895 Cup	GS				
2025	Championship	24	11	2	11	454	475	−21	24	7th		R4	1895 Cup	QF				
2026	Championship	24	17	0	7	757	356	+401	34	5th	Lost in Preliminary Semi-finals	R3	1895 Cup	RU				

== Honours ==
=== League ===
- First Division / Super League

Winners (3): 1977–78, 1987–88, 1988–89
Premiership

Winners (6): 1979–80, 1981–82, 1982–83, 1987–88, 1988–89, 1989–90

- RFL Lancashire League

Winners (1): 1919–20

=== Cups ===
- Challenge Cup

Winners (7): 1929–30, 1936–37, 1963–64, 1974–75, 1978–79, 1980–81, 1983–84

- League Cup

Winners (3): 1975–76, 1978–79, 1991–92

- Championship Cup

Winners (2): 2007, 2009

- Charity Shield

Winners (3): 1988–89, 1989–90, 1990–91

- RFL Lancashire Cup

Winners (7): 1945–46, 1974–75, 1975–76, 1976–77, 1978–79, 1979–80, 1990–91

- BBC2 Floodlit Trophy

Winners (1): 1978–79

=== International ===
- World Club Challenge

Winners (1): 1989

- European Championship

Winners (1): 1989

== Records ==
=== Player records ===
- Most tries in a match: 7 by Phil Cantillon vs York Wasps, 18 February 2001
- Fastest Hat trick in a match: 10 minutes by Danny Hulme vs Halifax. 21 April 2011,
- Most goals in a match: 14 by Mark Hewitt vs Oldham R.L.F.C., 25 July 1999, Tim Hartley vs Saddleworth Rangers, 7 March 2009
- Most points in a match: 38 by Gavin Dodd vs Doncaster Lakers, 10 June 2007
- Most tries in a season: 58 by Martin Offiah, 1988–89
- Most goals in a season: 161 by Mick Nanyn, 2007
- Most points in a season: 434 by Mick Nanyn, 2007
- Most career tries: 234 by Mal Aspey, 1964–80
- Most career goals: 1083 by Ray Dutton 1966–78
- Most career points: 2195 by Ray Dutton 1966–78
- Most career appearances: 587+4 by Keith Elwell 1970–86

=== 100+ tries ===
- 234 Mal Aspey 1964–65 – 1979–80
- 199 Eric Hughes [Centre] 1969–70 – 1983–84
- 181 Martin Offiah 1987–88 – 1990–91
- 161 David Hulme 1980–81 – 1996 & 2000 – 2001
- 151 Stuart Wright 1976–77 – 1986–87
- 144 Frank Myler 1955–56 – 1967–68
- 120 John Devereux 1989–90 – 1997
- 119 Andy Currier 1983–84 – 1992–93 & 1997
- 114 Phil Cantillon 1999 – 2003
- 112 Dennis O'Neill 1966–67 – 1978–79
- 111 Johnny Gaydon 1961–62 – 1971–72
- 110 William Thompson 1956–57 – 1964–65
- 108 Derek `Mick` George 1971–72 – 1981–82
- 107 Darren Wright 1985–86 – 1996
- 106 Tommy McCue 1931–32 – 1948–49
- 103 John Basnett 1981–82 – 1986–87
- 102 William Reid 1909–10 – 1926–27
- 101 Jimmy Hoey 1922–23 – 1934–35

=== 150+ goals ===
- 1072 Ray Dutton 1965–66 – 1977–78
- 708 Mick Burke 1978–79 – 1986–87
- 434 Jonathan Davies 1988–89 – 1992–93
- 395 Jimmy Hoey 1922–23 – 1934–35
- 389 Robert Randall 1960–61 – 1964–65
- 383 Harry Dawson 1951–52 – 1962–63
- 295 Mick Nanyn 2006 – 2007
- 243 John Myler 1976–77 – 1988–89
- 213 John Sale 1951–52 – 1957–58
- 209 Robin Whitfield 1961–62 – 1967–68
- 207 Arthur Pimblett 1957–58 – 1961–62
- 202 Mark Hewitt 1998 – 1999
- 201 Andy Currier 1983–84 – 1992–93 & 1997
- 195 Peter Topping 1927–28 – 1939–40
- 167 Colin Hutton 1945–46 – 1950–51
- 162 Harry Taylor 1908–09 – 1921–22

=== Team records ===
- Biggest victory: 90–0 vs Coventry Bears home, 21 April 2018
- Worst defeat: 76–6 vs Catalans Dragons away, 31 March 2012
- Highest attendance (Naughton Park): 24,205 vs St. Helens, 16 February 1961
- Highest attendance (all-time): 94,249 vs Warrington, 6 May 1950 (Challenge Cup Final) at Wembley Stadium
- Highest attendance vs a national touring team: 14,666 vs Australia, 18 November 1990 Kangaroo Tour
