= 2016 Widnes Vikings season =

- Super League XXI Rank: 7th
- Play-off result: N/A
- Challenge Cup: Quarter-finals
- 2016 record: Wins: 12; draws: 0; losses: 13
- Points scored: For: 467; against: 470

Team information
- Chairman: Steve O'Connor
- Head Coach: Denis Betts
- Captain: Kevin Brown
- Stadium: Halton Stadium
← 2015	List of seasons	2017 →

This article details the Widnes Vikings rugby league football club's 2016 season. This is the Vikings 5th consecutive season back in the Super League.

== Table ==
=== Super League table ===
Pos	Team	Pld	W	D	L	PF	PA	PD	Pts	Qualification
1	Hull F.C.	23	17	0	6	605	465	+140	34	Super League Super 8s
2	Warrington Wolves	23	16	1	6	675	425	+250	33	Super League Super 8s
3	Wigan Warriors	23	16	0	7	455	440	+15	32	Super League Super 8s
4	St Helens	23	14	0	9	573	536	+37	28	Super League Super 8s
5	Catalans Dragons	23	13	0	10	593	505	+88	26	Super League Super 8s
6	Castleford Tigers	23	10	1	12	617	640	−23	21	Super League Super 8s
7	Widnes Vikings	23	10	0	13	499	474	+25	20	Super League Super 8s
8	Wakefield Trinity Wildcats	23	10	0	13	485	654	−169	20	Super League Super 8s
9	Leeds Rhinos	23	8	0	15	404	576	−172	16	The Qualifiers
10	Salford Red Devils	23	10	0	13	560	569	−9	14 (Note: Salford deducted 6 points for salary cap breaches in 2014 and 2015.)	The Qualifiers
11	Hull Kingston Rovers	23	6	2	15	486	610	−124	14	The Qualifiers
12	Huddersfield Giants	23	6	0	17	511	569	−58	12	The Qualifiers

Source: Rugby League Project
Rules for classification: 1) Points; 2) Points difference; 3) Number of points scored;

=== Super 8s table ===
Pos	Team	Pld	W	D	L	PF	PA	PD	Pts	Qualification
1	Warrington Wolves (L)	30	21	1	8	852	541	+311	43	Semi-finals
2	Wigan Warriors (C)	30	21	0	9	669	560	+109	42	Semi-finals
3	Hull F.C.	30	20	0	10	749	579	+170	40	Semi-finals
4	St Helens	30	20	0	10	756	641	+115	40	Semi-finals
5	Castleford Tigers	30	15	1	14	830	808	+22	31	
6	Catalans Dragons	30	15	0	15	723	716	+7	30	
7	Widnes Vikings	30	12	0	18	603	643	−40	24	
8	Wakefield Trinity	30	10	0	20	571	902	−331	20	

Source: BBC Sport
(C) Champions; (L) League Leaders' Shield Winners

== 2016 fixtures and results ==
LEGEND
Win
Draw
Loss

2016 Super League Fixtures

Date	Competition	Rnd	Vrs	H/A	Venue	Result	Score	Tries	Goals	FG	Att	Lineup	Subs	
7/2/16	Super League XXI	1	Wakefield Trinity	A	Belle Vue	W	24-16	Sa (2), Hanbury, White	Hanbury 4/4	N/A	5,240	Rhys Hanbury, Corey Thompson, Chris Bridge, Charly Runciman, Patrick Ah Van, Kevin Brown (C), Joe Mellor, Eamon O'Carroll, Lloyd White, Gil Dudson, Setaimata Sa, Connor Farrell, Hep Cahill	Chris Dean, Manase Manuokafoa, Chris Houston, Aaron Heremaia	-
14/2/16	Super League XXI	2	Leeds	H	Halton Stadium	W	56-12	Marsh (2), Sa, Thompson (3), White, Runciman, Mellor, Farrell	Hanbury 7/9, Sa 1/1	N/A	6,596	Rhys Hanbury, Corey Thompson, Chris Bridge, Charly Runciman, Stefan Marsh, Kevin Brown (C), Joe Mellor, Eamon O'Carroll, Lloyd White, Gil Dudson, Setaimata Sa, Connor Farrell, Chris Houston	Chris Dean, Aaron Heremaia, Manase Manuokafoa, Hep Cahill	-
21/2/16	Super League XXI	11	Salford	A	AJ Bell Stadium	L	20-28	Hanbury, Houston, Marsh, Thompson	Hanbury 2/4	N/A	5,089	Rhys Hanbury, Corey Thompson, Chris Bridge, Charly Runciman, Stefan Marsh, Joe Mellor, Kevin Brown (C), Eamon O'Carroll, Lloyd White, Gil Dudson, Setaimata Sa, Chris Houston, Hep Cahill	Connor Farrell, Manase Manuokafoa, Macgraff Leuluai, Aaron Heremaia	-
28/2/16	Super League XXI	3	Huddersfield	A	Galpharm Stadium	W	36-18	Dean, Marsh (2), Runciman, Leuluai, Thompson (2)	Hanbury 4/7	N/A	5,183	Rhys Hanbury, Corey Thompson, Chris Bridge, Charly Runciman, Stefan Marsh, Joe Mellor, Kevin Brown (C), Eamon O'Carroll, Lloyd White, Gil Dudson, Chris Dean, Chris Houston, Hep Cahill	Matt Whitley, Manase Manuokafoa, Macgraff Leuluai, Aaron Heremaia	-
4/3/16	Super League XXI	4	Hull Kingston Rovers	H	Halton Stadium	W	30-16	Hanbury, Mellor (2), Thompson (2)	Hanbury 5/5	N/A	5,013	Rhys Hanbury, Corey Thompson, Chris Bridge, Charly Runciman, Stefan Marsh, Kevin Brown (C), Joe Mellor, Eamon O'Carroll, Lloyd White, Gil Dudson, Chris Dean, Chris Houston, Hep Cahill	Connor Farrell, Macgraff Leuluai, Manase Manuokafoa, Matt Whitley	-
10/3/16	Super League XXI	5	Hull F.C.	H	Halton Stadium	W	46-6	Mellor, Thompson (2), Marsh (3), Hanbury, Brown, Whitley	Hanbury 5/9	N/A	4,735	Rhys Hanbury, Corey Thompson, Chris Bridge, Charly Runciman, Stefan Marsh, Kevin Brown (C), Joe Mellor, Eamon O'Carroll, Lloyd White, Manase Manuokafoa, Chris Dean, Chris Houston, Hep Cahill	Macgraff Leuluai, Alex Gerrard, Matt Whitley, Aaron Heremaia	-
17/3/16	Super League XXI	6	Wigan	A	DW Stadium	W	18-12	Whitley, Marsh, Runciman	Hanbury 3/3	N/A	11,773	Rhys Hanbury, Corey Thompson, Chris Dean, Charly Runciman, Stefan Marsh, Joe Mellor, Kevin Brown (C), Eamon O'Carroll, Aaron Heremaia, Gil Dudson, Setaimata Sa, Chris Houston, Hep Cahill	Manase Manuokafoa, Macgraff Leuluai, Alex Gerrard, Matt Whitley	-
25/3/16	Super League XXI	7	Warrington	A	Halliwell Jones Stadium	L	10-28	Gilmore, Hanbury	Hanbury 1/2	N/A	15,008	Rhys Hanbury, Corey Thompson, Chris Dean, Stefan Marsh, Patrick Ah Van, Joe Mellor (C), Tom Gilmore, Eamon O'Carroll, Lloyd White, Gil Dudson, Setaimata Sa, Chris Houston, Macgraff Leuluai	Manase Manuokafoa, Alex Gerrard, Aaron Heremaia, Matt Whitley	-
28/3/16	Super League XXI	8	St. Helens	H	Halton Stadium	L	12-20	Hanbury (2)	Hanbury 2/2	N/A	9,076	Rhys Hanbury, Corey Thompson, Chris Dean, Ed Chamberlain, Patrick Ah Van, Joe Mellor (C), Tom Gilmore, Eamon O'Carroll, Aaron Heremaia, Gil Dudson, Setaimata Sa, Chris Houston, Hep Cahill	Manase Manoukafoa, Alex Gerrard, Macgraff Leuluai, Matt Whitley	-
2/4/16	Super League XXI	9	Catalans Dragons	A	Stade Gilbert Brutus	L	8-21	Thompson	Hanbury 2/2	N/A	8,642	Rhys Hanbury, Corey Thompson, Chris Dean, Charly Runciman, Patrick Ah Van, Joe Mellor (C), Tom Gilmore, Eamon O'Carroll, Aaron Heremaia, Gil Dudson, Matt Whitley, Chris Houston, Macgraff Leuluai	Manase Manuokafoa, Ed Chamberlain, Sam Brooks, Jordan Johnstone	-
10/4/16	Super League XXI	10	Castleford	H	Halton Stadium	L	24-34	Ah Van, Leuluai, Thompson, White	Bridge 4/4	N/A	5,081	Rhys Hanbury, Corey Thompson, Chris Bridge, Chris Dean, Patrick Ah Van, Kevin Brown (C), Joe Mellor, Eamon O'Carroll, Aaron Heremaia, Gil Dudson, Setaimata, Chris Houston, Macgraff Leuluai	Lloyd White, Alex Gerrard, Matt Whitley, Sam Brooks	-
22/4/16	Super League XXI	12	Warrington	H	Halton Stadium	L	16-48	Mellor, Thompson, Marsh	Hanbury 2/3	N/A	7,441	Rhys Hanbury, Corey Thompson, Chris Bridge, Charly Runciman, Stefan Marsh, Joe Mellor, Kevin Brown (C), Eamon O'Carroll, Lloyd White, Gil Dudson, Chris Dean, Chris Houston, Hep Cahill	Aaron Heremaia, Manase Manuokafoa, Setaimata Sa, Macgraff Leuluai	-
29/4/16	Super League XXI	13	Wakefield Trinity	H	Halton Stadium	L	16-18	Runciman, O'Carroll. Hanbury	Hanbury 2/3	N/A	4,398	Rhys Hanbury, Corey Thompson, Patrick Ah Van, Charly Runciman, Stefan Marsh, Joe Mellor, Aaron Heremaia, Gil Dudson, Lloyd White, Eamon O'Carroll, Chris Dean, Chris Houston, Hep Cahill	Manase Manuokafoa, Setaimata Sa, Macgraff Leuluai, Matt Whitley	-
15/5/16	Super League XXI	14	Hull KR	A	Craven Park	L	24-10	Dudson, Thompson	Hanbury 1/2	N/A	7,506	Rhys Hanbury, Corey Thompson, Charly Runciman, Chris Dean, Ed Chamberlain, Joe Mellor, Aaron Heremaia, Eamon O'Carroll, Lloyd White, Gil Dudson, Chris Houston, Matt Whitley, Hep Cahill	Jordan Johnstone, Manase Manuokafoa, Setaimata Sa, Macgraff Leuluai	-
21/5/16	Super League XXI	15	Salford	N	St James' Park	L	18-12	Hanbury, Bridge	Hanbury 2/3	N/A	39,331	Rhys Hanbury, Corey Thompson, Charly Runciman, Chris Bridge, Stefan Marsh, Joe Mellor, Kevin Brown, Eamon O'Carroll, Lloyd White, Gil Dudson, Chris Houston, Chris Dean, Hep Cahill	Aaron Heremaia, Manase Manuokafoa, Matt Whitley, Macgraff Leuluai	-
29/5/16	Super League XXI	16	Huddersfield	H	Halton Stadium	W	24-20	Thompson (2), Mellor (2), Marsh	Hanbury 2/5	N/A	4,683	Rhys Hanbury, Corey Thompson, Chris Bridge, Charly Runciman, Stefan Marsh, Joe Mellor, Kevin Brown, Gil Dudson, Lloyd White, Hep Cahill, Chris Dean, Chris Houston, Macgraff Leuluai	Setaimata Sa, Jack Buchanan, Manase Manuokafoa, Matt Whitley	-
3/6/16	Super League XXI	17	Hull F.C.	A	KC Stadium	L	30-10	Hanbury (9), Dean	Hanbury 1/2	N/A	10,259	Rhys Hanbury, Corey Thompson, Charly Runciman, Chris Bridge, Stefan Marsh, Joe Mellor, Kevin Brown, Hep Cahill, Lloyd White, Gil Dudson, Chris Houston, Chris Dean, Macgraff Leuluai	Jack Buchanan, Manase Manuokafoa, Setaimata Sa, Matt Whitley	-
9/6/16	Super League XXI	18	Castleford	A	The Jungle	W	28-38	Leuluai, Ah Van (2), Bridge, White (2), Mellor	Hanbury 5/7	N/A	4,968	Rhys Hanbury, Corey Thompson, Charly Runciman, Chris Bridge, Patrick Ah Van, Kevin Brown, Joe Mellor, Hep Cahill, Lloyd White, Jack Buchanan, Matt Whitley, Chris Dean, Macgraff Leuluai	Jay Chapelhow, Manase Manuokafoa, Brad Walker, Aaron Heremaia	-
16/6/16	Super League XXI	19	Wigan	H	Halton Stadium	L	0-7	N/A	N/A	N/A	6,219	Rhys Hanbury, Corey Thompson, Charly Runciman, Chris Bridge, Patrick Ah Van, Joe Mellor, Kevin Brown, Hep Cahill, Lloyd White, Jack Buchanan, Matt Whitley, Chris Dean, Macgraff Leuluai	Jay Chapelhow (Not Used), Manase Manuokafoa, Gil Dudson, Aaron Heremaia	-
3/7/16	Super League XXI	20	Leeds	A	Headingley	W	22-23	Thompson, Mellor, Ah Van, Hanbury	Hanbury 3/4	Mellor	16,130	Rhys Hanbury, Corey Thompson, Charly Runciman, Stefan Marsh, Patrick Ah Van, Joe Mellor, Kevin Brown, Hep Cahill, Lloyd White, Jack Buchanan, Chris Houston, Chris Dean, Macgraff Leuluai	Gil Dudson, Aaron Heremaia, Manase Manuokafoa, Matt Whitley	-
8/7/16	Super League XXI	21	St Helens	A	Langtree Park	L	12-10	Thompson, Ah Van	Hanbury 1/2	N/A	11,566	Rhys Hanbury, Corey Thompson, Charly Runciman, Stefan Marsh, Patrick Ah Van, Joe Mellor, Kevin Brown, Hep Cahill, Lloyd White, Jack Buchanan, Chris Houston, Chris Dean, Macgraff Leuluai	Gil Dudson, Manase Manuokafoa, Matt Whitley, Greg Burke	-
15/7/16	Super League XXI	22	Salford	H	Halton Stadium	L	24-32	Whitley (2), Ah Van, Thompson	White 3/3, Thompson 1/1	N/A	4,636	Rhys Hanbury, Corey Thompson, Charly Runciman, Stefan Marsh, Patrick Ah Van, Joe Mellor, Kevin Brown, Greg Burke, Lloyd White, Jack Buchanan, Matt Whitley, Chris Dean, Chris Houston	Hep Cahill, Aaron Heremaia, Manase Manuokafoa, Connor Farrell	-
24/7/16	Super League XXI	23	Catalans Dragons	H	Halton Stadium	W	32-4	Thompson, Ah Van, Mellor, Heremaia, Marsh	Thompson 3/5, Marsh 3/3	N/A	4,195	Corey Thompson, Stefan Marsh, Charly Runciman, Chris Dean, Patrick Ah Van, Joe Mellor, Kevin Brown, Greg Burke, Lloyd White, Jack Buchanan, Matt Whitley, Chris Houston, Hep Cahill	Macgraff Leuluai, Aaron Heremaia, Manase Manuokafoa, Connor Farrell	-

2016 Super 8's

Date	Competition	Rnd	Vrs	H/A	Venue	Result	Score	Tries	Goals	FG	Att	Lineup	Subs	
6/8/16	Super League XXI	S1	Catalans Dragons	A	Stade Gilbert Brutus	L	26-10	Whitley, Ah Van	White 1/2	N/A	8,562	Rhys Hanbury, Corey Thompson, Charly Runciman, Stefan Marsh, Patrick Ah Van, Kevin Brown, Joe Mellor, Greg Burke, Lloyd White, Jack Buchanan, Chris Dean, Chris Houston, Hep Cahill	Manase Manuokafoa, Macgraff Leuluai, Matt Whitley, Aaron Heremaia	-
11/8/16	Super League XXI	S2	Hull F.C.	H	Halton Stadium	L	0-38	N/A	N/A	N/A	4,359	Joe Mellor, Patrick Ah Van, Corey Thompson, Ed Chamberlain, Ryan Ince, Kevin Brown, Aaron Heremaia, Jack Buchanan, Lloyd White, Greg Burke, Chris Houston, Matt Whitley, Hep Cahill	Manase Manuokafoa, Macgraff Leuluai, Jay Chapelhow, Connor Farrell	-
21/8/16	Super League XXI	S3	Wakefield Trinity	H	Halton Stadium	W	40-8	Ah Van (2), Hanbury, Whitley, Thompson, Marsh, White	White 5/7, Thompson 1/1	N/A	4,010	Rhys Hanbury, Corey Thompson, Chris Dean, Stefan Marsh, Patrick Ah Van, Joe Mellor, Kevin Brown, Jack Buchanan, Lloyd White, Greg Burke, Chris Houston, Matt Whitley, Hep Cahill	Gil Dudson, Aaron Heremaia, Jay Chapelhow, Connor Farrell	-
1/9/16	Super League XXI	S4	Wigan	A	DW Stadium	W	6-8	Thompson (2)	White 0/2	N/A	11,495	Rhys Hanbury, Corey Thompson, Chris Dean, Charly Runciman, Stefan Marsh, Joe Mellor, Kevin Brown, Jack Buchanan, Lloyd White, Greg Burke, Chris Houston, Matt Whitley, Hep Cahill	Gil Dudson, Aaron Heremaia, Jay Chapelhow, Connor Farrell	-
9/9/16	Super League XXI	S5	Warrington	A	Halliwell Jones Stadium	L	30-12	Mellor, Thompson	Thompson 1/1, White 1/1	N/A	10,488	Rhys Hanbury, Corey Thompson, Chris Dean, Charly Runciman, Patrick Ah Van, Joe Mellor, Kevin Brown, Greg Burke, Lloyd White, Jack Buchanan, Matt Whitley, Chris Houston, Hep Cahill	Jay Chapelhow, Gil Dudson, Aaron Heremaia, Connor Farrell	-
18/9/16	Super League XXI	S6	St Helens	H	Halton Stadium	L	8-21	Ah Van, Thompson	White 0/1, Thompson 0/1	N/A	6,128	Rhys Hanbury, Corey Thompson, Chris Dean, Charly Runciman, Patrick Ah Van, Joe Mellor, Kevin Brown, Greg Burke, Lloyd White, Jack Buchanan, Matt Whitley, Chris Houston, Macgraff Leuluai	Jay Chapelhow, Manase Manuokafoa, Aaron Heremaia, Connor Farrell	-
25/9/16	Super League XXI	S7	Castleford	A	The Jungle	L	40-26	Farrell (2), Thompson (2), Ah Van	White 3/5	N/A	7,103	Rhys Hanbury, Corey Thompson, Chris Dean, Charly Runciman, Patrick Ah Van, Joe Mellor, Tom Gilmore, Jay Chapelhow, Lloyd White, Gil Dudson, Matt Whitley, Connor Farrell, Hep Cahill	Ted Chapelhow, Macgraff Leuluai, Aaron Heremaia, Manase Manuokafoa	-

2016 Challenge Cup

Date	Competition	Rnd	Vrs	H/A	Venue	Result	Score	Tries	Goals	FG	Att	Lineup	Subs	
8/5/16	2016 Challenge Cup	5	Halifax	A	The Shay	W	18-28	Heremaia, White, Houston, Runciman, Chapelhow	Hanbury 4/5	N/A	2,032	Rhys Hanbury, Corey Thompson, Charly Runciman, Chris Dean, Ed Chamberlain, Joe Mellor, Aaron Heremaia, Hep Cahill, Lloyd White, Gil Dudson, Chris Houston, Setaimata Sa, Macgraff Leuluai	Manase Manuokafoa, Matt Whitley, Jay Chapelhow, Jordan Johnstone	-
24/6/16	2016 Challenge Cup	Quarter Finals	Warrington	A	Halliwell Jones Stadium	L	20-18	Mellor, Whitley, Runciman	Hanbury 3/3	N/A	7,773	Rhys Hanbury, Corey Thompson, Charly Runciman, Chris Bridge, Patrick Ah Van, Joe Mellor, Kevin Brown, Hep Cahill, Lloyd White, Jack Buchanan, Chris Houston, Chris Dean, Macgraff Leuluai	Manase Manuokafoa, Gil Dudson, Matt Whitley, Aaron Heremaia	-

== Player appearances ==
- Super League Only

FB=Fullback	C=Centre	W=Winger	SO=Stand-off	SH=Scrum half	PR=Prop	H=Hooker	SR=Second Row	L=Loose forward	B=Bench

No	Player	1	2	11	3	4	5	6	7	8	9	10	12	13	14	15	16	17	18	19	20	21	22	23	S1	S2	S3	S4	S5	S6	S7	SF
1	Rhys Hanbury	FB	FB	FB	FB	FB	FB	FB	FB	FB	FB	FB	FB	x	x	x	x	x	x	x	x	x	x	x	x	x	x	x	x	x	x	x
2	Corey Thompson	W	W	W	W	W	W	W	W	W	W	W	W	x	x	x	x	x	x	x	x	x	x	x	x	x	x	x	x	x	x	x
3	Chris Bridge	C	C	C	C	C	C					C	C	x	x	x	x	x	x	x	x	x	x	x	x	x	x	x	x	x	x	x
4	Charly Runciman	C	C	C	C	C	C	C			C		C	x	x	x	x	x	x	x	x	x	x	x	x	x	x	x	x	x	x	x
5	Patrick Ah Van	W							W	W	W	W		x	x	x	x	x	x	x	x	x	x	x	x	x	x	x	x	x	x	x
6	Kevin Brown	SO	SO	SO	SO	SO	SO	SO				SO	SO	x	x	x	x	x	x	x	x	x	x	x	x	x	x	x	x	x	x	x
7	Joe Mellor	SH	SH	SH	SH	SH	SH	SH	SH	SH	SH	SH	SH	x	x	x	x	x	x	x	x	x	x	x	x	x	x	x	x	x	x	x
8	Eamon O'Carroll	P	P	P	P	P	P	P	P	P	P	P	P	x	x	x	x	x	x	x	x	x	x	x	x	x	x	x	x	x	x	x
9	Lloyd White	H	H	H	H	H	H		H			B	H	x	x	x	x	x	x	x	x	x	x	x	x	x	x	x	x	x	x	x
10	Manase Manuokafoa	B	B	B	B	B	P	B	B	B	B	x	B	x	x	x	x	x	x	x	x	x	x	x	x	x	x	x	x	x	x	x
11	Chris Houston	B	L	SR	SR	SR	SR	SR	SR	SR	SR	SR	SR	x	x	x	x	x	x	x	x	x	x	x	x	x	x	x	x	x	x	x
12	Danny Tickle													x	x	x	x	x	x	x	x	x	x	x	x	x	x	x	x	x	x	x
13	Hep Cahill	L	B	L	L	L	L	L		L			L	x	x	x	x	x	x	x	x	x	x	x	x	x	x	x	x	x	x	x
14	Chris Dean	B	B		SR	SR	SR	C	C	C	C	C	SR	x	x	x	x	x	x	x	x	x	x	x	x	x	x	x	x	x	x	x
15	Setaimata Sa	SR	SR	SR				SR	SR	SR		SR	B	x	x	x	x	x	x	x	x	x	x	x	x	x	x	x	x	x	x	x
16	Paddy Flynn													x	x	x	x	x	x	x	x	x	x	x	x	x	x	x	x	x	x	x
17	Stefan Marsh		W	W	W	W	W	W	C				W	x	x	x	x	x	x	x	x	x	x	x	x	x	x	x	x	x	x	x
18	Gil Dudson	P	P	P	P	P		P	P	P	P	P	P	x	x	x	x	x	x	x	x	x	x	x	x	x	x	x	x	x	x	x
19	Macgraff Leuluai	x	x	B	B	B	B	B	L	B	L	L	B	x	x	x	x	x	x	x	x	x	x	x	x	x	x	x	x	x	x	x
20	Alex Gerrard	x	x	x	x	x	B	B	B	B		B		x	x	x	x	x	x	x	x	x	x	x	x	x	x	x	x	x	x	x
21	Tom Gilmore	x	x	x	x	x	x	x	SO	SO	SO	x	x	x	x	x	x	x	x	x	x	x	x	x	x	x	x	x	x	x	x	x
22	Matt Whitley	x	x	x	B	B	B	B	B	B	SR	B		x	x	x	x	x	x	x	x	x	x	x	x	x	x	x	x	x	x	x
23	Ted Chapelhow	x	x	x	x	x	x	x	x	x	x	x	x	x	x	x	x	x	x	x	x	x	x	x	x	x	x	x	x	x	x	x
24	James Chapelhow	x	x	x	x	x	x	x	x	x	x	x	x	x	x	x	x	x	x	x	x	x	x	x	x	x	x	x	x	x	x	x
25	Ed Chamberlain	x	x	x	x	x	x	x	x	C	B	x	x	x	x	x	x	x	x	x	x	x	x	x	x	x	x	x	x	x	x	x
26	Ryan Ince	x	x	x	x	x	x	x	x	x	x	x	x	x	x	x	x	x	x	x	x	x	x	x	x	x	x	x	x	x	x	x
27	Alma Salvilla	x	x	x	x	x	x	x	x	x	x	x	x	x	x	x	x	x	x	x	x	x	x	x	x	x	x	x	x	x	x	x
28	Brad Walker	x	x	x	x	x	x	x	x	x	x	x	x	x	x	x	x	x	x	x	x	x	x	x	x	x	x	x	x	x	x	x
29	Olly Ashall	x	x	x	x	x	x	x	x	x	x	x	x	x	x	x	x	x	x	x	x	x	x	x	x	x	x	x	x	x	x	x
30	Danny Craven	x	x	x	x	x	x	x	x	x	x	x	x	x	x	x	x	x	x	x	x	x	x	x	x	x	x	x	x	x	x	x
32	Connor Farrell	SR	SR	B		B								x	x	x	x	x	x	x	x	x	x	x	x	x	x	x	x	x	x	x
33	Aaron Heremaia	B	B	B	B		B	H	B	H	H	H	B	x	x	x	x	x	x	x	x	x	x	x	x	x	x	x	x	x	x	x
34	Sam Brooks	x	x	x	x	x	x	x	x	x	B	B	x	x	x	x	x	x	x	x	x	x	x	x	x	x	x	x	x	x	x	x
35	Jordan Johnstone	x	x	x	x	x	x	x	x	x	B	x	x	x	x	x	x	x	x	x	x	x	x	x	x	x	x	x	x	x	x	x

= Injured

= Suspended

== Challenge Cup ==
LEGEND
Win
Draw
Loss

Date	Competition	Rnd	Vrs	H/A	Venue	Result	Score	Tries	Goals	Att	TV
17/4/16	Cup	5th	Rochdale Hornets	A	Spotland Stadium	W	62-6	Bridge (3), Brown (3), Johnstone, Dean, Thompson, Marsh, Manuokafoa, Whitley	Bridge 7/12	1,242	-
8/5/16	Cup	6th	Halifax	A	The Shay	W/D/L	Score	Try Scorers	Goal Scorers	Attendance	TV
0/0/16	Cup	QF	Team	H/A	Stadium	W/D/L	Score	Try Scorers	Goal Scorers	Attendance	TV
0/0/16	Cup	SF	Team	H/A	Stadium	W/D/L	Score	Try Scorers	Goal Scorers	Attendance	BBC Sport

== Player appearances ==
- Challenge Cup Games only

FB=Fullback	C=Centre	W=Winger	SO=Stand Off	SH=Scrum half	P=Prop	H=Hooker	SR=Second Row	L=Loose forward	B=Bench

No	Player	5	6	QF	SF
1	Rhys Hanbury		x	x	x
2	Corey Thompson	FB	x	x	x
3	Chris Bridge	C	x	x	x
4	Charly Runciman		x	x	x
5	Patrick Ah Van		x	x	x
6	Kevin Brown	SO	x	x	x
7	Joe Mellor	x	x	x	x
8	Eamon O'Carroll		x	x	x
9	Lloyd White	H	x	x	x
10	Manase Manuokafoa	P	x	x	x
11	Chris Houston		x	x	x
12	Danny Tickle		x	x	x
13	Hep Cahill	B	x	x	x
14	Chris Dean	SR	x	x	x
15	Setaimata Sa		x	x	x
16	Paddy Flynn	W	x	x	x
17	Stefan Marsh	W	x	x	x
18	Gil Dudson	P	x	x	x
19	Macgraff Leuluai	L	x	x	x
20	Alex Gerrard		x	x	x
21	Tom Gilmore	SH	x	x	x
22	Matt Whitley	SR	x	x	x
23	Ted Chapelhow	x	x	x	x
24	James Chapelhow	B	x	x	x
25	Ed Chamberlain	C	x	x	x
26	Ryan Ince	x	x	x	x
27	Alma Salvilla	x	x	x	x
28	Brad Walker	x	x	x	x
29	Olly Ashall	x	x	x	x
30	Danny Craven	x	x	x	x
32	Connor Farrell	x	x	x	x
33	Aaron Heremaia	x	x	x	x
34	Sam Brooks	B	x	x	x
35	Jordan Johnstone	B	x	x	x

== 2016 squad statistics ==
- Appearances and points include (Super League, Challenge Cup and Play-offs) as of 22 April 2016.

No	Player	Position	Age	Previous club	Apps	Tries	Goals	DG	Points
1	Rhys Hanbury	Fullback	N/A	Crusaders	12	7	37	0	102
2	Corey Thompson	Winger	N/A	Canterbury Bulldogs	13	14	0	0	56
3	Chris Bridge	Centre	N/A	Warrington Wolves	9	3	11	0	34
4	Charly Runciman	Centre	N/A	St George Illawarra Dragons	9	3	0	0	12
5	Patrick Ah Van	Wing	N/A	Bradford Bulls	5	1	0	0	4
6	Kevin Brown	Stand off	N/A	Huddersfield Giants	10	4	0	0	16
7	Joe Mellor	Scrum half	N/A	Wigan Warriors	12	5	0	0	20
8	Eamon O'Carroll	Prop	N/A	Hull F.C.	12	0	0	0	0
9	Lloyd White	Hooker	N/A	Crusaders	11	3	0	0	12
10	Manase Manuokafoa	Prop	N/A	Bradford Bulls	12	1	0	0	4
11	Chris Houston	Second row	N/A	Newcastle Knights	12	1	0	0	4
12	Danny Tickle	Second row	N/A	Hull F.C.	0	0	0	0	0
13	Hep Cahill	Loose forward	N/A	Crusaders	10	0	0	0	0
14	Chris Dean	Centre	N/A	Wakefield Trinity Wildcats	12	2	0	0	8
15	Setaimata Sa	Second row	N/A	Hull F.C.	8	3	1	0	14
16	Paddy Flynn	Wing	N/A	Widnes Vikings Academy	1	0	0	0	0
17	Stefan Marsh	Centre	N/A	Wigan Warriors	9	11	0	0	44
18	Gil Dudson	Prop	N/A	Wigan Warriors	12	0	0	0	0
19	Macgraff Leuluai	Prop	N/A	Leigh Centurions	11	2	0	0	8
20	Alex Gerrard	Prop	N/A	Widnes Vikings Academy	5	0	0	0	0
21	Tom Gilmore	Stand off	N/A	Widnes Vikings Academy	4	1	0	0	4
22	Matt Whitley	Second row	N/A	Widnes Vikings Academy	9	3	0	0	12
23	Ted Chapelhow	Prop	N/A	Widnes Vikings Academy	0	0	0	0	0
24	James Chapelhow	Prop	N/A	Widnes Vikings Academy	1	0	0	0	0
25	Ed Chamberlain	Centre	N/A	Widnes Vikings Academy	3	0	0	0	0
26	Ryan Ince	Wing	N/A	Widnes Vikings Academy	0	0	0	0	0
27	Alma Salvilla	Hooker	N/A	Widnes Vikings Academy	0	0	0	0	0
28	Brad Walker	Loose forward	N/A	Widnes Vikings Academy	0	0	0	0	0
29	Olly Ashall	Wing	N/A	Widnes Vikings Academy	0	0	0	0	0
30	Danny Craven	Fullback	N/A	Widnes Vikings Academy	0	0	0	0	0
32	Connor Farrell	Second row	N/A	Wigan Warriors (Loan)	4	1	0	0	4
33	Aaron Heremaia	Hooker	N/A	Hull F.C.	11	0	0	0	0
34	Sam Brooks	Prop	N/A	Whitehaven	3	0	0	0	0
35	Jordan Johnston	Prop	N/A	Wakefield Trinity Wildcats (Loan)	2	1	0	0	4

= Injured = Suspended

== 2016 transfers in/out ==
In

Player	Position	Previous club	Contract	Announced
(England) Chris Bridge	Centre	Warrington Wolves	2 Years	July 2015
(Samoa) Setaimata Sa	Second row	Hull F.C.	1 Year	August 2015
(Australia) Corey Thompson	Winger/fullback	Canterbury-Bankstown Bulldogs	2 Years	August 2015
(Australia) Chris Houston	Second row	Newcastle Knights	2 Years	November 2015
(England) Connor Farrell	Second row	Wigan Warriors	1 Year Loan	January 2016
(England) Sam Brooks	Prop	Whitehaven	2 Years	January 2016

Out

Player	Position	Signed for	Contract	Date
(Samoa) Willie Isa	Centre/Second Row	Wigan Warriors	2 Years	September 2015
(England) Chris Clarkson	Second row	Hull Kingston Rovers	3 Years	October 2015
(England) Phil Joseph	Second row	Salford Red Devils	1 Year	October 2015
(England) Grant Gore	Half back	Whitehaven	1 Year	October 2015
(England) Liam Carberry	Hooker	Whitehaven	1 Year	October 2015
(England) Jack Owens	Winger	St. Helens	2 Years	November 2015
(Australia) Danny Galea	Second row	Retirement	N/A	November 2015
(England) Danny Craven	Full back	Featherstone Rovers	1 Year Loan	November 2015
(Scotland) Ben Kavanagh	Prop	Bradford Bulls	2 Years	December 2015
(England) Paddy Flynn	Prop	Castleford Tigers	Season Loan	May 2016
(England) Declan Hulme	Centre	Released		
(Australia) Cameron Phelps	Centre	Released		
(England) Paul Johnson	Second row	Released		
