= Phil Farrell =

Ireland international rugby league footballer

Personal information
- Full name: Phil Farrell
- Born: 14 February 1980 (age 46) Wigan, Greater Manchester, England

Playing information
- Position: Second-row
Club
Years	Team	Pld	T	G	FG	P
2000	Wigan Warriors	0	0	0	0	0
2000(loan)	→ Lancashire Lynx	4	1	0	0	4
2000–2004	Oldham	119	29	0	0	116
2005–06	Rochdale Hornets	33	2	0	0	8
2006	Oldham	6	1	0	0	4
2007	Batley Bulldogs	12	1	0	0	4
	Total	174	34	0	0	136
Representative
Years	Team	Pld	T	G	FG	P
2003	Ireland	1	0	0	0	0
- Source: As of 20 Aug 2023
- Relatives: See: O'Loughlin Farrell family

Phil Farrell (born 14 February 1980) is a former professional rugby league footballer who played in the 1990s and 2000s. He played at representative level for Ireland and Lancashire, and at club level for Oldham (two spells), and Rochdale Hornets, as a second-row.

== International honours ==
Farrell won a cap for Ireland while at Oldham in 2003.

== Family ==
He is the brother of current Ireland Rugby Union Head Coach Andy Farrell and Uncle to Andy's son England Rugby Union outhalf Owen Farrell.
