= Owen Farrell =

England international rugby union player (born 1991)

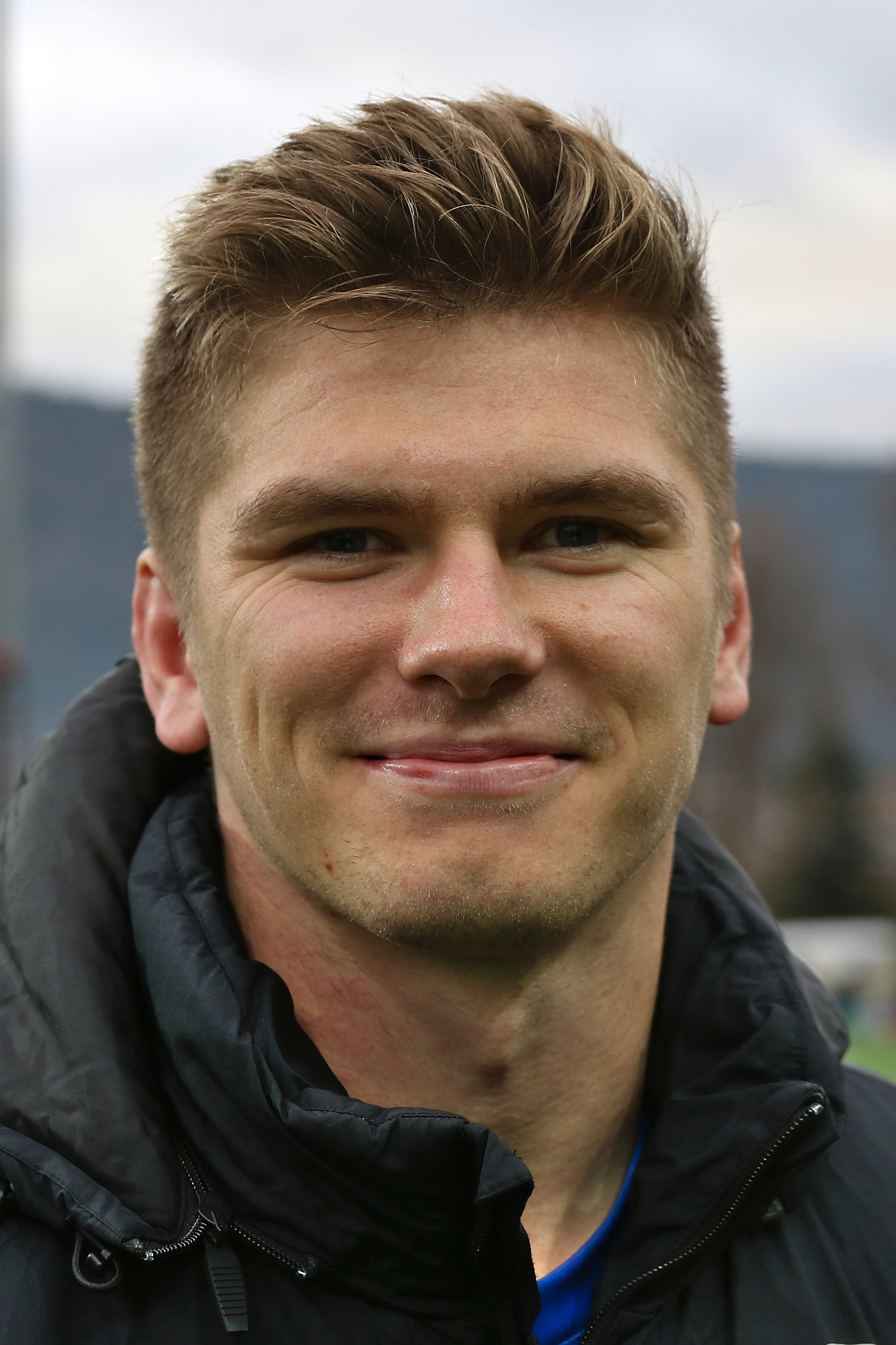
- Farrell with Saracens in 2015
- Full name: Owen Andrew Farrell
- Born: Owen Andrew O'Loughlin; 24 September 1991 (age 35) Billinge Higher End, Greater Manchester, England
- Height: 1.88 m (6 ft 2 in)
- Weight: 92 kg (203 lb; 14 st 7 lb)
- School: St. John Fisher Catholic High School; St. George's School
- University: University of Hertfordshire
- Notable relative: See: O'Loughlin Farrell family

Rugby union career
- Position(s): Fly-half, Centre
- Current team: Saracens
Senior career
Years	Team	Apps	(Points)
2008–2024	Saracens	254	(2,838)
2010–2011	→ Bedford Blues (loan)	4	(11)
2024–2025	Racing 92	16	(41)
2025–	Saracens	5	(50)
- Correct as of 28 April 2025
International career
Years	Team	Apps	(Points)
2011-2012	England U20	7	(10)
2012–2023	England	112	(1,237)
2013–2025	British & Irish Lions	8	(34)
- Correct as of 26 July 2025
Medal record
Men's Rugby union
Representing England
Rugby World Cup
Silver medal – second place	2019 Japan	Squad
Bronze medal – third place	2023 France	Squad

Owen Andrew Farrell (né O'Loughlin; born 24 September 1991) is an English rugby union player who plays as a fly-half for Premiership Rugby club Saracens. He was the England captain from 2018 to 2023. Although fly-half is his preferred position, he frequently played at inside centre at test level. He has spent the majority of his club career with Saracens. He spent a season on loan with Bedford Blues and played the 2024/25 season with French side Racing 92. He is known for his goal kicking prowess.

Making his international debut in 2012, Farrell has represented England internationally. With over 1,200 points scored in over 100 tests, Farrell is one of the highest point scorers in test history, and holds the record for highest points scored as a player at both England and Saracens. He took a break from international rugby following the 2023 Rugby World Cup.

His father, Ireland's current head coach Andy Farrell, played both rugby union and rugby league for England, and was captain for England rugby league and his club Wigan Warriors.

== Early life ==
Farrell was born in Wigan, Greater Manchester, England, on 24 September 1991. His birth was registered with the surname O'Loughlin as his parents were not married at the time, but changed his surname to Farrell when they married.

Farrell began playing rugby league in his hometown at the age of eight for Wigan St Patricks. When his father Andy signed for Saracens in 2005, his family moved to Harpenden in Hertfordshire, where Owen at the age of 13 or 14 was introduced to rugby union for the first time.

In 2014, Farrell told the Guardian newspaper: "It was a huge change. I was turning 14 and at first I was adamant I didn't want to leave Wigan. All my friends were there and I loved league. It was everything I'd ever known and I was sure I wouldn't like it down south. But I was probably the first one in the family to settle."

He has two younger sisters, Elleshia and Gracie, and one younger brother, Gabriel.

His maternal uncle is former Wigan Warriors and England rugby league captain Sean O'Loughlin, while his paternal uncle Phil Farrell has played for Ireland. He is also second cousin (via his fathers's side) to current Wigan captain and England international Liam Farrell and his younger brother Connor.

He attended the University of Hertfordshire where he graduated with a BA (Hons) in Business.

== Club career ==
=== Saracens ===
Farrell held the record of youngest player ever to appear in English professional rugby union after playing for Saracens 11 days after his 17th birthday, in a 26–17 home defeat against Llanelli Scarlets in the EDF Energy Cup on 5 October 2008, until this record was broken in November 2009 by George Ford of Leicester Tigers.

In the 2010–11 season, Farrell signed for Bedford Blues on loan. However, he returned to Saracens and was pivotal in the 2010–11 Aviva Premiership Final, kicking five penalties and converting James Short's try, ending with a personal haul of 17 points in the 22–18 victory over reigning champions Leicester Tigers.

Farrell was "man of the match" in a 26–14 win over Harlequins which took Saracens to third in the Aviva Premiership. Saracens' head coach, Mark McCall told the Press Association: "Owen controlled the game with maturity beyond his years. He can play centre or fly-half with equal authority and we are delighted both with the win and with his performance."

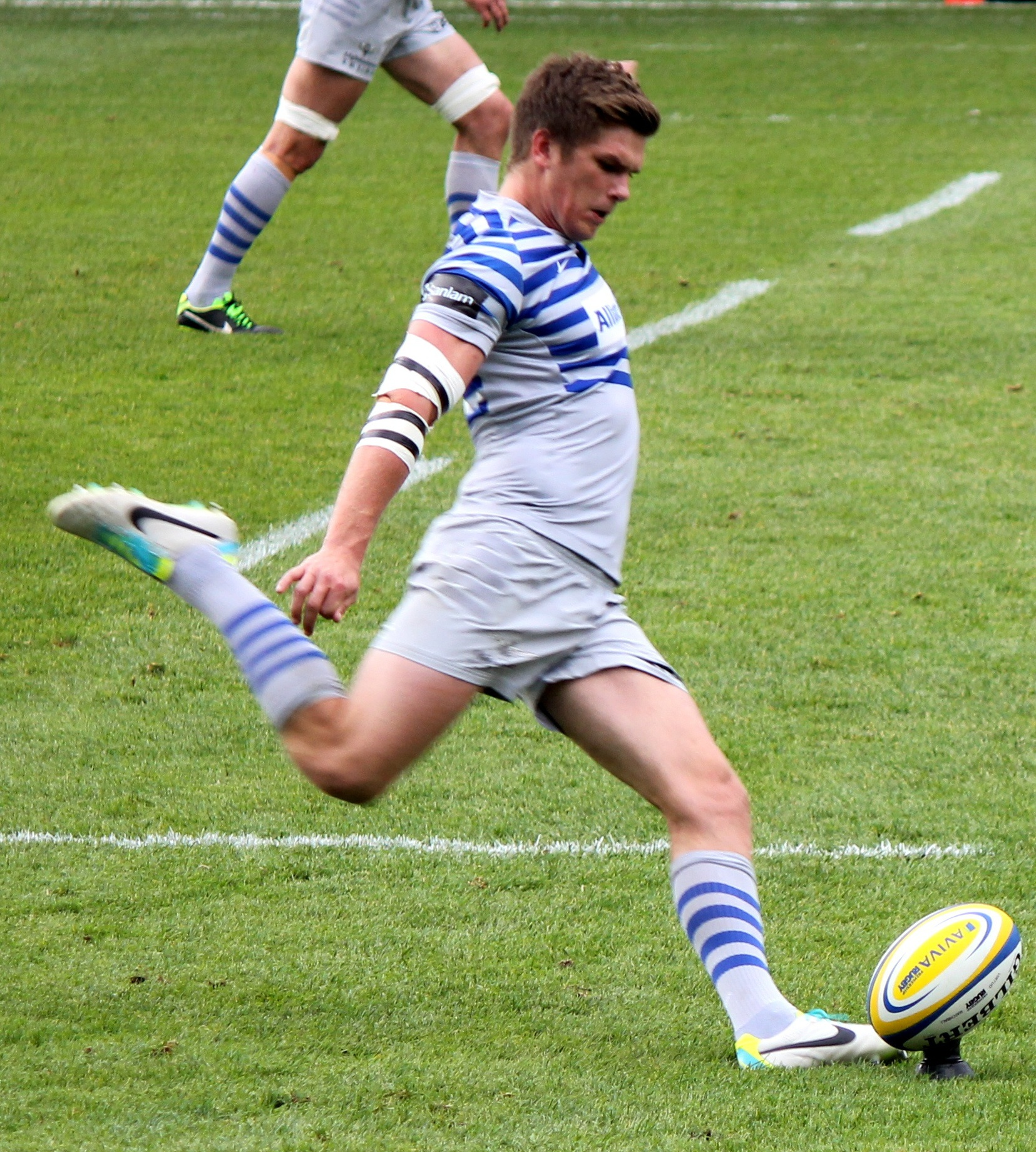
Farrell kicking at goal in 2013.

The 2013–14 season was a strong season for Farrell and Saracens, with the London Club reaching the Heineken Cup against Toulon, but they missed out on the title after losing the match 23–6, and there was more disappointment for Farrell and Saracens after being defeated 24–20 in the Aviva Premiership Final against Northampton at Twickenham. Farrell struggled with injury in the 2013–14 season after being knocked out unconscious in Saracens's 49–10 win over Leicester Tigers after colliding with opponent Niki Goneva, resulting in Farrell being carried off on a stretcher in a neck brace.

In the 2014–15 season, Farrell won the man of the match award in the Premiership Final, scoring a try and kicking a further 13 points. Saracens went on to win the final 28–16.

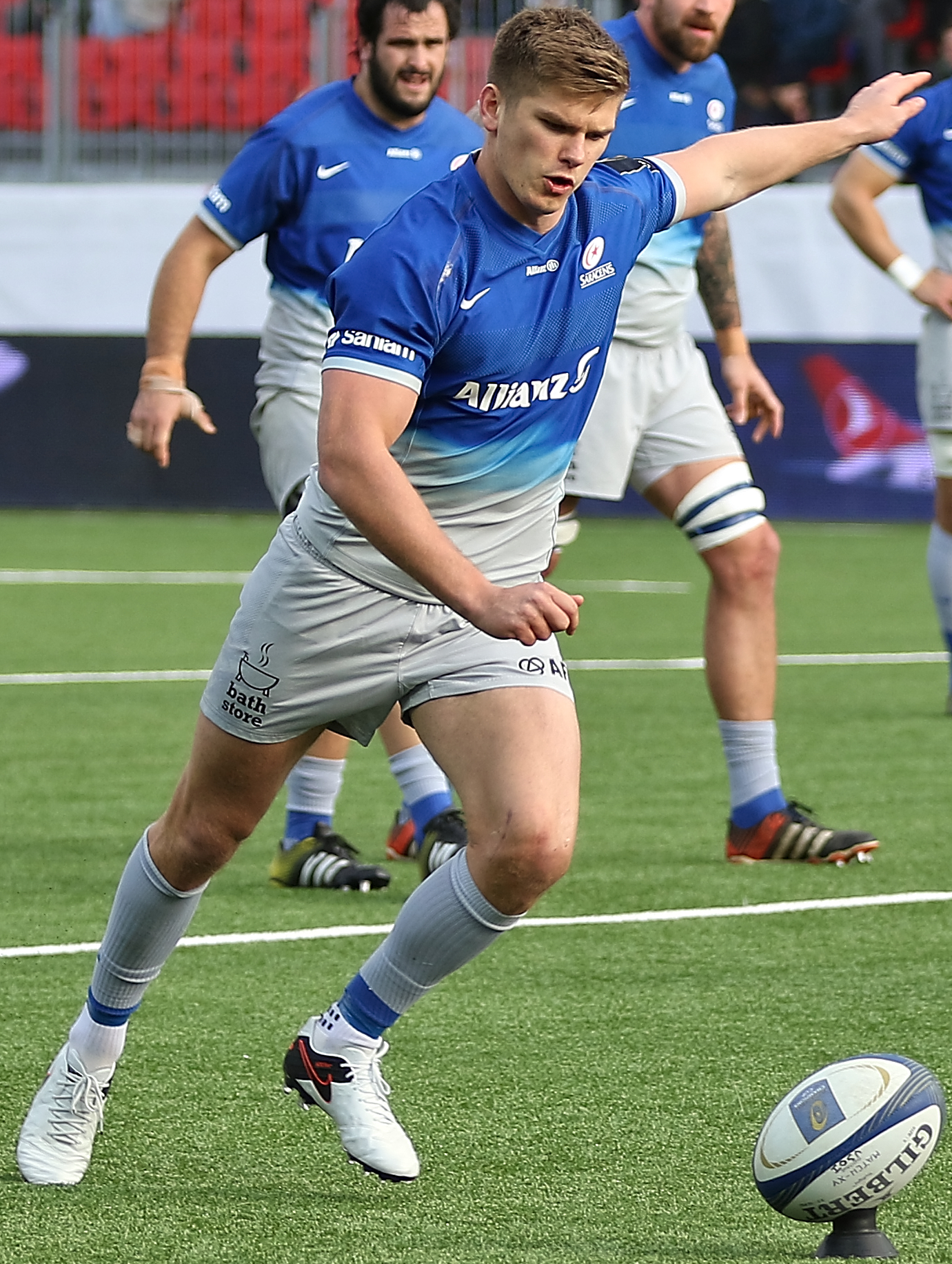
Farrell kicking for goal in the European Rugby Champions Cup.

The following season, Farrell won the Fans' Player of the Season for Saracens, and kicked all 21 points against Racing 92 in the 2016 European Rugby Champions Cup Final, which Saracens won. He subsequently was awarded the Top Points Scorer award with 129 points scored in the tournament. That season Farrell kicked 13 points again as Saracens also retained the Premiership title with a 28–20 victory over Exeter.

In 2017, Farrell overtook Glen Jackson as the Saracens' all-time leading points scorer, having scored 1548 points in his career so far. In May 2017, Owen helped Saracens to a second successive European Champions Cup, scoring two conversions and three penalties in the final, and was named European Player of the Year.

In 2018, Farrell won his fourth Premiership title after a 27–10 victory over Exeter, in which he converted two tries.

In 2019, Farrell won the European Champions Cup for a third time, scoring 10 points in the final against Leinster at St James' Park in Newcastle. He also won the Premiership for a fifth time, scoring three conversions and two penalties as Saracens again overcame Exeter.

In April 2020, Farrell announced that he would defer £300,000 of his wages in order to keep Saracens solvent. The salary would be repaid over an 18-month period. Saracens asked all players earning more than £75,000 to defer wages until the start of next season.

On 5 September 2020, in a Saracens loss to Wasps, Farrell was sent off by referee Christophe Ridley for a high tackle on Charlie Atkinson, for which he was banned 5 games. The suspension ensured he would be available for England's entire autumn campaign, but the fly-half was ruled out Saracens' Champions Cup quarter-final match against Leinster.

Following the ban, Alex Goode replaced Farrell at fly half. Farrell became Goode's personal coach, helping to prepare him. In 2022, Goode told The Times: "In Paris we were a bit worried about their artificial pitch being quite hard, as it rises the [kicking] tee up a bit. Two hours before kick-off he (Farrell) was there with a scalpel cutting away at my tee for about 45 minutes, pre-game. He said: 'I'll do it to make it right for you'. He wants the best for you without question."

In April 2021, Farrell was named club captain of Saracens on a permanent basis. Saracen's Director of Rugby Mark McCall told the Welwyn Hatfield Times: "He is thoughtful, insightful and modest but at his core he is a competitor who will never stop trying to improve." Farrell told the press conference: "When I think of all the good captains that I've been lucky enough to be under is that they've been themselves. They've learnt a lot but they've been themselves throughout and it's important to be authentic.”

Farrell suffered an ankle injury which kept him out for the majority of the 2021–22 Gallagher Premiership season, however he did feature in the final against Leicester, which Saracens lost 15–12.

In April 2022, after four months on the sidelines following two ankle operations, Farrell showed a return to form as he helped Saracens defeat Exeter and acquire the bonus points required to qualify for the playoffs. England teammate Jamie George told the Guardian: "He turned into our head coach, he is that good. He is so, so important to this team and he offers so much on and off the field. With his voice, with his actions, in the week the way he prepares, he shows people how it is done. I can't speak highly enough of him. He is the best player I have worked with in every facet of the game."

Farrell helped Saracens win the Premiership title again in 2023, scoring two conversions and three penalties in the final as Saracens defeated Sale Sharks.

=== Racing 92 ===
On 22 January 2024, it was confirmed that Farrell would sign for Top 14 side Racing 92 at the end of the 2023–24 season.

=== Return to Saracens ===
On 16 June 2025, after just one season with Racing 92, Farrell agreed to re-join Saracens on an initial two-year deal at the end of the 2024/25 season.

== International career ==
=== England ===
==== 2012 ====
Stuart Lancaster picked Farrell to play for England in his first game as head coach, against Scotland in the 2012 Six Nations Championship on 4 February 2012. Farrell was the youngest player in the squad.

Farrell played at inside centre next to his Saracens teammates Brad Barritt and Charlie Hodgson. He kicked two penalties and a conversion, but also missed two tough penalties from around 50 metres. His next match, against Italy, saw him produce a faultless kicking display, kicking four penalties and a conversion. In the next match, against Wales, Farrell played at fly-half for the first time in an England shirt after Charlie Hodgson sustained a finger injury in the week leading up to the Wales game. Once again his goal-kicking was impressive, missing just one kick out of five, but he was replaced by Toby Flood later in the game after appearing to injure his leg after a clearance kick. He then played against France and Ireland. Farrell kicked well in the Ireland game, only missing one conversion. He finished the competition with 63 points from five games.

The 2012 summer tour of South Africa saw Farrell get selected again. He played all of the warm-up game against the Barbarians and scored a respectable 17 points in a game that England won comfortably. Farrell again played all through the first match against South Africa, where England lost 22–17 in a tight game. He kicked all four of his penalties but missed a conversion.

The 21-year old was dropped for the second test against South Africa at Ellis Park.

On 1 December 2012, Owen Farrell replaced injured Toby Flood as fly-half for the Autumn series against New Zealand. He lined up opposite Dan Carter, then believed to be the world's best fly-half. Farrell scored a total of 17 points in helping England to a record-breaking victory; it was their greatest-ever margin of victory over the All Blacks.

He was nominated for IRB Player of the Year, but lost out to the New Zealand stand-off Dan Carter.

==== 2013 ====
Farrell started in the Calcutta Cup match against Scotland, only missing one kick in a near-faultless display. He set up one try and assisted England to a strong start in their Six Nations campaign. He was also nominated the RBS Six Nations man of the match for his performance.

After a break from English rugby due to the Lions tour, Farrell returned to England for the 2013 QBE autumn internationals. Ahead of the game against New Zealand, in which he was to line up against Dan Carter, Graham Rowntree, England's forwards coach said: "I love listening to him. He's like his dad [the England defence coach, Andy]. He's not afraid to speak his mind in what he demands from the team. He's humble, does his homework and knows his stuff. He's an exceptional pro and one all the other players look up to. We have absolute faith in Owen, that's why he starts."

Farrell played the full 80 minutes of the match against the Wallabies, kicking two penalties (but also missing three with one hitting the post), two conversions and scoring his debut England try, breaking through a gap in the Australian line of defence and touching down under the posts. His try proved to be the deciding score, as England went on to win 20–13.

==== 2015–2016 ====
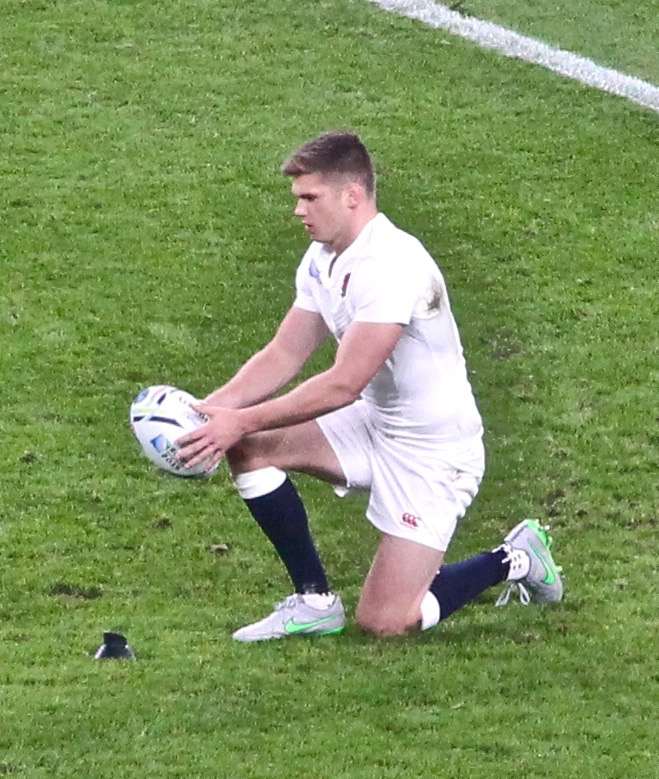
Farrell with England at the 2015 Rugby World Cup.

Farrell was ruled out of the entire 2015 Six Nations competition with a serious knee injury. However, after recovering from his injury Farrell was picked to train in the England camp ahead of the England 2015 World Cup. He went on to start in England's first World Cup warm-up match on 15 August, against France, scoring two out of three conversions and consequently helping England win the game 19–14. Farrell was picked by Lancaster as one of two fly-halves in the 31-man World Cup squad.

Farrell came on as a replacement for George Ford in the opening match of the world cup against Fiji, a 35–11 win where Farrell did not miss any kicks. Farrell played for the full 80 minutes in England's second 2015 World Cup match, a 25–28 loss to Wales, scoring 20 points after failing to miss any kicks for the second straight match. He subsequently kept his place to face Australia the following weekend, on 2 October 2015, which England went on to lose 13–33 after Farrell was sin-binned in the 70th minute. This was the first time that England failed to make the playoffs of a Rugby World Cup, having lost to both Wales and Australia now. Farrell started at inside centre in England's final pool match, a 60–3 win over Uruguay. Farrell was subbed off for Jonathan Joseph in the 59th minute after missing two of his six kicks.

In January 2016, after his fine displays for Saracens, Farrell was selected in the first squad of new England head coach Eddie Jones. With injuries to Henry Slade and Manu Tuilagi leaving few choices at inside centre, Farrell was selected at 12 in Jones' first two matches, away to Scotland and Italy respectively. George Ford became a regular starter at 10 in Farrell's place. He was selected as one of England's vice-captains for the Six Nations, along with Mike Brown and Billy Vunipola, under Dylan Hartley's captaincy. In the first two matches, Farrell contributed 22 points including a try against Italy, and assumed the captaincy when Hartley was substituted late on.

Farrell went on to start at inside centre in all five of England's games during the Six Nations tournament, winning his first major international trophy as part of England's Grand Slam-winning side. Farrell finished the tournament as the leading scorer with 69 points, bringing his personal tally for England to 412 and making him the second-highest points scorer in the history of the England national team, with only Jonny Wilkinson having scored more.

In the summer of 2016, England embarked on a three-match series in Australia. Farrell was initially picked to start at fly-half for the first test, however, he was soon reverted to inside centre with Ford assuming the No.10 shirt. England would go on to win the series 3–0, with Farrell playing a pivotal role, being named man of the match in the third test and scoring 66 points on tour. Farrell was nominated for the six-man shortlist for the 2016 World Player of the Year Award for the second time in his career, alongside his Saracens teammates Billy Vunipola and Maro Itoje.

==== 2017–2018 ====
Farrell played all 80 minutes every test in the 2017 Six Nations Championship and helped England retaining the Six Nations title despite missing out the Grand Slam after losing the final game to Ireland. The highlight of Farrell's 2017 Six Nations was on 11 March 2017 when he scored 26 points against Scotland in a 61–21 win for England.

Farrell had a huge workload in the 2018 Six Nations Championship and played in every minute of the competition. Farrell scored a try against Italy on 4 February 2018 and also set one up for first-five George Ford. Disappointingly however, Farrell only kicked 5/8 of his goals against Italy, which disallowed England from putting 50 points on Italy, leaving England to win 46–15. On 24 February, Farrell scored all of England's points against Scotland, including a try. This was not enough however, with Farrell's second try of the match disallowed. Scotland went on to upset England 25–13, with Farrell's game not doing enough to get England a win.

On 10 March 2018, Farrell captained England for the first time in his career when they faced France in Stade de France in Paris. Farrell did not miss any kicks against France in the match and defended well, but England lost 22–16 due to giving away penalties to French scrum-half Maxime Machenaud who managed to convert them into points. Farrell later admitted to media that England's lack of discipline cost them the test.

England went on to lose their final Six Nations match against Ireland, with Hartley back as captain. Farrell started the match at fly-half, with George Ford dropping to the bench, his first start in the ten jersey for England since June 2016.

==== 2018 ====
After England captain Dylan Hartley sustained another concussion in 2018 and was subsequently ruled out of England's three-test series against South Africa, Farrell was promoted to captain in Hartley's absence, leading England to a 2–1 series defeat. Although England rushed to a 24–3 lead early in the first test, with Farrell scoring a try, South Africa came back into the test eventually winning 42–39. England won the final test 25–10 for Farrell's first victory as England captain.

During the autumn, Dylan Hartley again returned from injury, but Farrell was selected as co-captain. The pair led England to victories over South Africa (12–11) and Australia (37–20), and a defeat to New Zealand (16–15), while Farrell came off the bench during a 35–15 victory over Japan (George Ford captained this game).

==== 2019 Six Nations Championship ====
Farrell was retained at 10 and as the sole England Captain during the 2019 Six Nations Championship, with Hartley missing the whole tournament.

England started the tournament with a shock 32–20 victory against the Irish in Dublin. It was their first away win against the Irish since 2013, and Farrell's third penalty 10 minutes from the final whistle ensured victory. The next match was against France at Twickenham. Farrel scored 17 points, including his side's sixth and final try. The match, which finished 44–8, represented England's largest win against the French in 90 years.

In England's third match ended in a 21–13 defeat to Wales, who launched a second-half comeback to achieve their 12th successive victory.

Following the defeat against Wales, Farrell led his lteam to a 57–14 victory over Italy.

England suffered a collapse in their final match against Scotland. Behind 31–0 after thirty minutes, Scotland staged a comeback, bringing the score to 31–7 by the end of the first half, dominating the second half of the match. Farrell was substituted with ten minutes left in the game, and it was his replacement, George Ford, who proved the saviour for England to score after the clock had gone red to rescue England and bring the score to 38-38. the match for a draw. It was Scotland's first draw at Twickenham since 1989, and the first time they had retained the Calcutta Cup since 1984.

At the end of his first year as captain, following the second-half collapse against Scotland, a debate began over whether Farrell was overwhelmed by performing the three roles of captain, fly-half and goal kicker. Former England captain and Leadership coach Will Carling, was brought in by the RFU to work with Farrell.

==== 2019 Rugby World Cup ====
Farrell was selected as England's captain for 2019 Rugby World Cup in Japan, where England would face France, Argentina, Tonga and the United States in Pool C. He also started and captained two of England's four warm-up matches, starting at 12 against Ireland in a record 57–15 victory, and at 10 against Italy in England's first ever match at St James' Park in Newcastle.

Farrell suffered a sickening blow to head during the match against USA. The high tackle from John Quill resulted in Farrell taking a shoulder charge to head which removed a chunk of skin from his nose.

England performed well at the 2019 World Cup, topping their pool with big wins over Argentina, Tonga and the USA (their match against France was cancelled due to a typhoon), and following this up with a record equalling win over Australia in the quarter-final. Farrell went on to lead England to victory over New Zealand in the semi-final, winning 19–7. Farrell captained England against South Africa in the Final, South Africa upset the favourites for the game and won 32–12.

The semi-final win against New Zealand made Farrell just the fourth England Captain (after John Pullin, Will Carling and Martin Johnson) to lead and beat all of the “Big Three” Southern Hemisphere sides: Australia, New Zealand and South Africa. As captain, he has 3 wins against Australia, 1 against New Zealand, and 2 against South Africa.

==== 2020–2021 ====
Following the World Cup, Farrell retained the England captaincy and led England to victory in the 2020 Six Nations and, following the COVID-19 outbreak, that year's Autumn Nations Cup. Farrell finished Autumn Nations Cup as the Tournament's top points scorer as he claimed his first two pieces of silverware as England Captain. Despite missing half of his kicks at goal in the Final, Farrell scored the match winning penalty deep into extra time. England finished the year with only a single defeat (their opening Six Nations match against France in Paris) from nine games.

Farrell and England made a poor start to their title defence in the 2021 Six Nations, with a first loss to Scotland at Twickenham in thirty-eight years in their opening game. Farrell and England had much improved performances against Italy and Wales, though the latter ended in defeat to end their title defence. Wales had two controversially awarded tries in the first half, but despite this England clawed their way back to make it 24–24, only to give away a succession of penalties, ultimately giving Wales a sixteen-point victory.

England went on to beat France at Twickenham in round four; France were aiming for a Grand Slam at the time but England won a late victory with a clinical display, a repeat of the Autumn Nations Cup final the previous year. Farrell contributed eleven tackles, nearly twice as many more than any other back, and had a faultless day from the boot to give England victory.

England lost their final match away to Ireland in Dublin, with Farrell going off with concussion during the second half. England ended the Six Nations in 5th place, their worst ever placement.

A personal achievement for Farrell in the 2020–21 season was crossing the 1,000 international points in test rugby, becoming the second Englishman to reach the achievement, and at the time only the sixth overall.

Ahead of his 100th game for England, Farrell told The Times: “The best part of the games is how engaging they are, when you're lost in it, when you're not thinking. When the game's gone by like that, that's the best, that's where there's nothing else going on, where there's no worry, there's no anything. You're just in it.”

==== 2022 ====
In January 2022, Farrell was ruled out of the Six Nations following a freak injury acquired in training. England coach Eddie Jones told the Guardian: "I've chatted to [Owen] a couple of times. Owen's one of the most resilient, one of the most driven players that I know. He's got to take his medicine now, which is have the operation, rehab, go through all that pain, but he wants to be the best player he can be. He wants to captain England again, he wants to play for England again. And so he'll apply himself really well to his rehab. And he could come back better than ever. And that's what we're anticipating."

On 19 November 2022, Farrell made his 100th Cap for England against The All Blacks in the 2022 Autumn Nations Series, the game ended in a 25–25 draw with England coming back in the last 10 minutes. Farrell gave a 3-point contribution to the match.

On reaching his 100th game for England, Farrell was presented with some gifts from his team, including a small, metal golden cap, which is reserved for the elite few who reach 100.

In December 2022, Farrell described the RFU's decision to sack Eddie Jones as “unbelievably disappointing.” Farrell told The Times: "I don't think it [the momentum for Jones's early departure] has come from the players. There is obviously stuff we all want to get better at, but as players you look at yourself and see what you can do."

==== 2023 ====
On 16 January 2023, Farrell was named as England captain for the Six Nations that year, despite a three-week suspension for a high tackle against Gloucester's Jack Clement which Rugby authorities judged to be "too high rather than malicious."

On 12 August 2023, in a World Cup warmup game against Wales, Farrell became the first England player to receive a red card under the new 'bunker review' system for a high tackle against Taine Basham. The red card was overturned after a disciplinary board deemed that Basham had a "sudden and significant change in direction", meaning that Farrell did not receive a ban that would affect his availability in the World Cup. This decision was subsequently appealed by World Rugby. Farrell was banned for 4 games on 22 August 2023.

After the 2023 Rugby World Cup, which England finished in third place. Farrell announced that he was not taking part in the 2024 Six Nations and that he would be stepping back from international rugby due to his mental health.

In June 2024, following his move to Racing 92, he became ineligible to play for England due to the RFU's policy of not selecting players based outside England. When he returned to Saracens in 2025, Farrell was not selected for England's summer tour.

=== British & Irish Lions ===
Farrell was selected as part of the British & Irish Lions squad for the 2013 tour to Australia. Farrell started for the Lions in Hong Kong on 1 June against the Barbarians, kicking three penalties and three conversions in a convincing 59–8 win for the Lions. In his second game against Western Force, Farrell started on the bench, came on in the 66th minute and scored a try with his first touch, helping the Lions towards a 69–17 win. He gained his first Lions test cap, coming off the bench to replace Johnny Sexton, in the 41–16 series decider.

In April 2017, Farrell was named again as part of the Lions squad for the tour to New Zealand. He played a pivotal role in the series, starting in all three tests against the All Blacks. The first test, which was a 30–15 loss to the Lions had Farrell start at 10, while England teammate Ben Te'o starting at 12. Farrell moved to 12 for the next two tests, with Te'o dropping to the bench to accommodate Irish fly-half Sexton. With three minutes left of the second test of the series, the Lions were awarded a penalty due to a dangerous tackle by All Black prop Charlie Faumuina. Farrell managed to convert the penalty kick, allowing the Lions to defeat the All Blacks in the second test 24–21, breaking a number of records.

Farrell did not miss a penalty kick in the final match of the series, a 15–15 draw, which allowed the Lions to draw the series with the All Blacks. Farrell also scored the most points of any player who went on tour with the Lions in 2017, scoring 45 points (31 from tests).

In July 2025, having not been named in the initial squad, Farrell was called up to the squad for the Lions' tour to Australia by his father and head coach, Andy Farrell, following a forearm injury to Elliot Daly. Farrell played in two of the test matches.

== Personal life ==
He married his longtime girlfriend Georgie in July 2018. They have three sons born in March 2019 and March 2021.

Despite his success, Farrell feels uncomfortable being the centre of attention. Former England head coach Stuart Lancaster described Farrell as "more introverted than extroverted."

On being described as "the Wigan foghorn" by teammate Danny Care in 2014, Farrell told The Guardian: "Good. Communicating and being loud is a big part of my game. I've never been shy about doing that. But you need to make sure you back it up with knowledge and performance. When I was a bit younger I made too much of trying to stick up for myself. But I don't need to prove that I'm not soft or too young any more. It's now about trying to play as well as I can for my team."

Farrell is highly protective of his private life, maintaining what has been described as "a dull public persona".

Farrell studied for a degree in management and leadership. The subject of his 12,000 word dissertation was reflective learning.

Farrell is a patron of the Duchenne muscular dystrophy charity Duchenne UK. He celebrates every point he scores by linking his index fingers together to make a 'JJ' sign, symbolising Joining Jack, a charity dedicated to the needs of sufferers of Duchenne muscular dystrophy.

== Career statistics ==
=== List of international tries ===
Number	Position	Points	Tries	Result	Opposition	Venue	Date	Ref.
1	Fly-half	15	1	Won	Australia	Twickenham Stadium	2 November 2013	
2	Fly-half	22	1	Won	Italy	Stadio Olimpico	15 March 2014	
3	Centre	17	1	Won	Italy	Stadio Olimpico	14 February 2016	
4	Centre	18	1	Won	Australia	AAMI Park	18 June 2016	
5	Centre	19	1	Won	South Africa	Twickenham Stadium	12 November 2016	
6	Centre	16	1	Won	Italy	Stadio Olimpico	4 February 2018	
7	Centre	13	1	Lost	Scotland	Murrayfield	24 February 2018	
8	Centre	16	1	Lost	South Africa	Ellis Park Stadium	9 June 2018	
9	Fly-half	22	1	Won	Australia	Twickenham Stadium	24 November 2018	
10	Fly-half	17	1	Won	France	Twickenham Stadium	10 February 2019	

=== International analysis by opposition ===
Opposition	Played	Win	Loss	Draw	Tries	Points	Win %
Argentina	4	3	1	0	0	54	75%
Australia (Note: Includes two British and Irish Lions test appearances obtained during the 2013 and 2025 British and Irish Lions tours.)	17	14	3	0	3	217	82.35%
Fiji	5	4	1	0	0	20	80%
France	12	8	4	0	1	119	66.67%
Georgia	1	1	0	0	0	10	100%
Ireland	13	9	4	0	0	127	69.23%
Italy	10	10	0	0	3	127	100%
Japan	2	2	0	0	0	15	100%
New Zealand (Note: Includes three British and Irish Lions test appearances and thirty-one points obtained during the 2017 New Zealand tour.)	10	3	5	2	0	96	30%
Samoa	1	1	0	0	0	0	100%
Scotland	10	6	3	1	1	110	60%
South Africa (Note: Includes two British and Irish Lions test appearances and three points obtained during the 2021 South Africa tour.)	14	4	9	1	2	126	28.57%
Tonga	1	1	0	0	0	15	100%
United States	1	1	0	0	0	0	100%
Uruguay	1	1	0	0	0	8	100%
Wales	13	7	6	0	0	143	53.85%
Career	119	80	35	4	10	1,181	67.23%

as of 26 July 2025

== Honours ==
British & Irish Lions

- 2× Test Series Win: 2013, 2025
- 1× Test Series Draw: 2017
- 1× Test Series Loss: 2021

England

- Rugby World Cup / Webb Ellis Cup
  - Silver Medal: 2019
  - Bronze Medal: 2023
- 3× Six Nations Championship: 2016, 2017, 2020
- 5x Six Nations Runner Up: 2012, 2013, 2014, 2015, 2019
- 1 x Grand Slam 2016
- 3× Triple Crown: 2014, 2016, 2020
- 6× Calcutta Cup: 2012, 2013, 2014, 2016, 2017, 2020
- 2× Summer Internationals Tour Wins: 2016, 2022
- 1× Autumn Nations Cup: 2020

Saracens

- 6× Premiership Rugby: 2011, 2015, 2016, 2018, 2019, 2023
- 1× RFU Championship: 2021
- 3× European Rugby Champions Cup: 2016, 2017, 2019

Individual

- 1x European Player of the Year: 2017,
- 3× World Rugby Men's 15s Player of the Year Nominations: 2012, 2016, 2017

Sporting positions
Preceded by Brad Barritt	Saracens captain Jul 2020 – Jun 2024	Succeeded by Maro Itoje
Preceded by Dylan Hartley; Dylan Hartley; George Ford; George Ford; George Ford; Courtney Lawes; Courtney Lawes; Ellis Genge; Ellis Genge; Courtney Lawes	England captain Mar 2018; Jun 2018 – Nov 2018; Nov 2018 – Mar 2019; Aug – Sep 2019; Oct 2019 – Mar 2021; Nov 2021; Nov 2022 – Feb 2023; Mar 2023; Aug 2023; Sep – Oct 2023	Succeeded by Dylan Hartley; George Ford; George Ford; George Ford; Lewis Ludlow; Courtney Lawes; Ellis Genge; Ellis Genge; Courtney Lawes; Jamie George
