= O'Loughlin Farrell family =

English rugby family

The O'Loughlin Farrell family of Wigan, England have produced a number of notable rugby league and rugby union footballers. The majority of those players started their professional careers at their home club, Wigan Warriors, and many have gone on to make a significant impact at club and international level. The family has Irish heritage.

== Family Tree ==
**Kevin O'Loughlin**	**Keiron O'Loughlin**	Carole	Peter Farrell
**Sean O'Loughlin**	Colleen O'Loughlin	**Andy Farrell**	**Phil Farrell**
**George O'Loughlin**	**Owen Farrell**	**Liam Farrell**	**Connor Farrell**

Bold indicates rugby playing members of the family.
Non-notable family members are not included unless they help illustrate the relation between notable family members.

== Playing members ==
Family Member (Life)	Current status	Club Career (Note: Loans not included)	International Career (apps)	Coaching Career	Ref.
Kevin O'Loughlin (????–2017)	Deceased	Wigan, Swinton, Blackpool	No caps	None	
Keiron O'Loughlin (1953–)	Retired	Wigan (1970–79), Workington (1979–81; 1990), Widnes (1981–85), Salford (1985–88), Leigh (1989)	Lancashire rugby league (4)	None	
Andy Farrell (1975–)	Ireland rugby union Head Coach	Wigan (1991–04); Captain (1996–04); Saracens (2005–09)	(United Kingdom) Great Britain rugby league (34); England rugby league (11); England rugby union (8); Lancashire rugby league (3)	Saracens Head Coach (2010–12); England rugby union Assistant Coach (2011–15); Ireland rugby union Assistant Coach (2016–19); Head Coach (2019–present); British & Irish Lions Defence Coach (2013); Head Coach (2025)	
Phil Farrell (1980–)	Retired	Wigan (2000); Oldham (2000–04; 2006); Rochdale (2004–06); Batley (2007)	Ireland rugby league (1)	None	
Sean O'Loughlin (1982–)	Wigan Warriors Assistant Coach	Wigan (2002–20); Captain (2006–20)	(United Kingdom) Great Britain rugby league (11); England rugby league (25); Lancashire rugby league (1)	Wigan Assistant Coach (2020–present)	
Liam Farrell (1990–)	Retired	Wigan (2010–2026); Captain (2022–2026)	England rugby league (11)	None	
Owen Farrell (1991–)	Saracens Player	Saracens (2008–2024,2025-present); Captain (2020–2024); Racing 92 (2024–2025)	England rugby union (112); British & Irish Lions (8)	None	
Connor Farrell (1993–)	Retired	Wigan (2013–17); Featherstone (2018); Bradford (2019–20)	No caps	None	
George O'Loughlin (2005/6–)	Wigan Warriors Player	Wigan (2026–present)	No caps	None	

== Records and statistics ==
=== As players ===
==== England ====
As of 5 November 2022 for League; As of 15 October 2023 for Union

Points and appearances

- Andy Farrell has scored the seventh most points for the England national rugby league team with 78.
- Owen Farrell has scored the most points for the England national rugby union team with 1206. In addition, he has scored the eighth most point for the British & Irish Lions with 34.
- Sean O'Loughlin is joint ninth highest appearance maker for the England national rugby league team with 28 caps.

Captaincy

- Andy Farrell and Sean O'Loughlin have both captain the England national rugby league team from 1996–2001 and 2015–2018 respectively.
- Owen Farrell was the second longest serving captain of the England national rugby union team, serving for 58 matches between 2018 and 2023.
- Owen Farrell captained the England national rugby union team to the 2020 Six Nations Championship.

==== Wigan Warriors ====
As of 15 October 2023

- Collectively, the family has made 1,124+ appearances, and scored 338 tries and 4,034 points for Wigan Warriors.
- Sean O'Loughlin is Wigan's most capped player of all time with 425 appearance, Andy and Liam Farrell rank forth and fifth on that list with 304 and 293 appearance recectfully.
- The family has delivered several majoir honours as captain of Wigan Warriors:
  - Andy Farrell:
    - Super League II
    - 2002 Challenge Cup
  - Sean O'Loughlin:
    - Super League XV
    - 2011 Challenge Cup
    - 2013 Challenge Cup
    - Super League XVIII
    - Super League XXI
    - 2017 World Club Challenge
    - Super League XXIII
  - Liam Farrell:
    - 2022 Challenge Cup
    - Super League XXVIII
    - 2024 World Club Challenge
    - 2024 Challenge Cup
    - Super League XXIV

==== Saracens ====
- Owen Farrell captained Saracens F.C. to the 2022–23 Premiership Rugby title.

=== As head coach ===
- Andy Farrell lead the Ireland national rugby union team to the 2023 Six Nations Championship and 2024 Six Nations Championship.
- Andy Farrell lead the British & Irish Lions to a series victory against Australia in 2025.

=== Halls of Fame ===
- Andy Farrell was inducted into the British Rugby Football League Hall of Fame in 2022.
- Andy Farrell and Sean O’Loughlin were inducted into the Wigan Warriors Hall of Fame in ???? and 2020 respectfully.
