= Charly Runciman =

Australian rugby league footballer

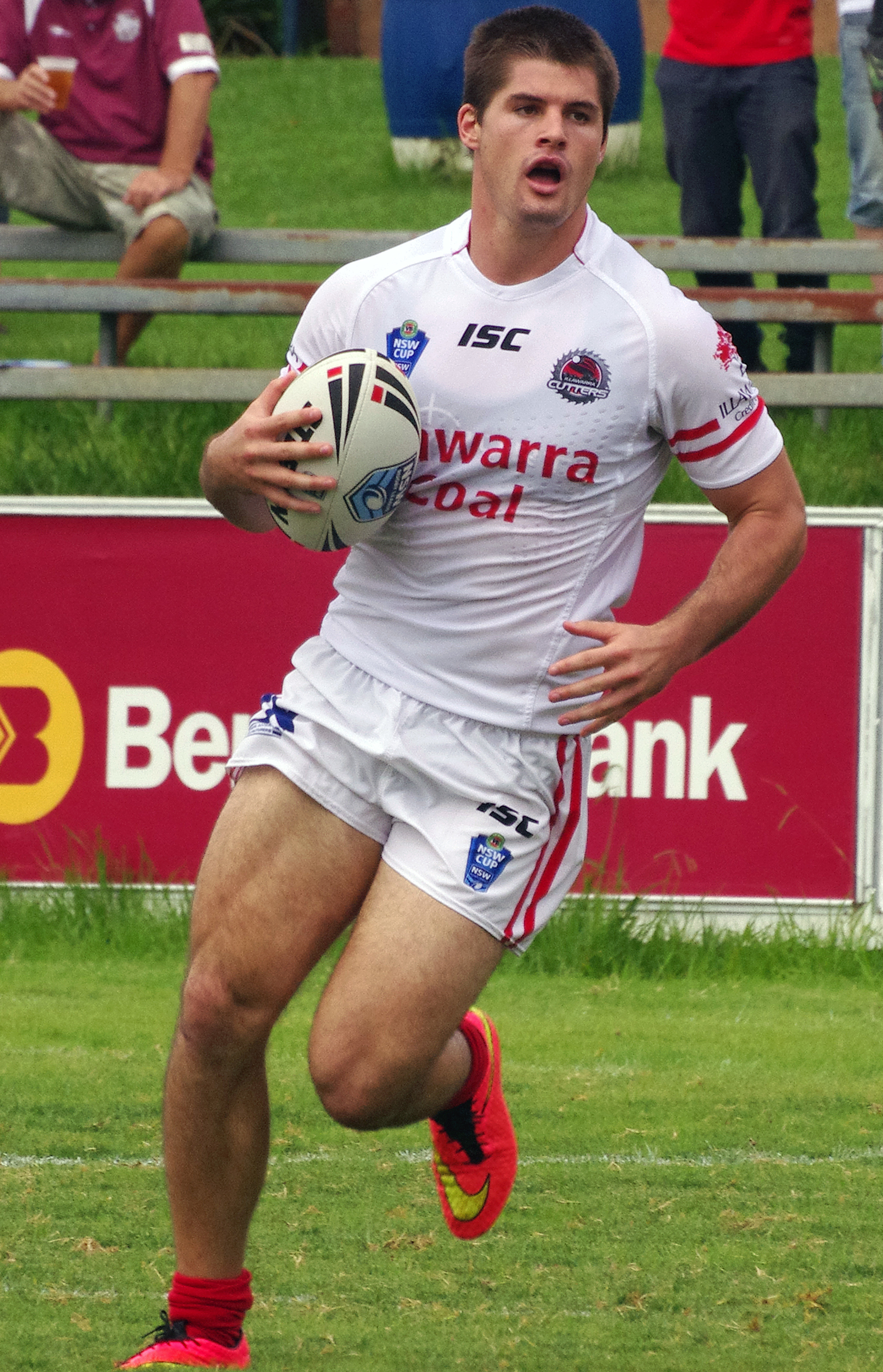

Personal information
- Born: 22 July 1993 (age 31); Dubbo, New South Wales, Australia
- Height: 185 cm (6 ft 1 in)
- Weight: 96 kg (15 st 2 lb)

Playing information
- Position: Centre, Wing, Second-row
Club
Years	Team	Pld	T	G	FG	P
2013–15	St George Illawarra	12	6	0	0	24
2015–18	Widnes Vikings	93	24	0	0	96
	Total	105	30	0	0	120
- Source: As of 12 August 2018

Charly Runciman (born 22 July 1993) is an Australian professional rugby league footballer who plays as a centre and winger for the St. George Illawarra Dragons in the Canterbury Cup NSW.

He previously played for the St. George Illawarra Dragons in the NRL and the Widnes Vikings in the Super League.

== Background ==
Born in Dubbo, New South Wales, Runciman played his junior football for the St Johns and Dubbo CYMS, before being signed by the St. George Illawarra Dragons.

== Playing career ==
=== Early career ===
In 2012 and 2013, Runciman played for the St. George Illawarra Dragons' NYC team. At the end of 2012, he was named the Dragons' NYC Player of the Year. On 20 April 2013, he played for the New South Wales under-20s team against the Queensland under-20s team.

=== 2013 ===
In Round 16 of the 2013 NRL season, Runciman made his NRL debut for the Dragons against the Penrith Panthers. On 27 August 2013, he was named at centre in the 2013 NYC Team of the Year. On 13 October 2013, he played for the Junior Kangaroos against the Junior Kiwis.

=== 2014 ===
On 23 May 2014, Runciman re-signed with the Dragons on a 2-year contract.

=== 2015 ===
On 21 July 2015, Runciman signed a 2 1/2-year contract with Super League team Widnes effective immediately, after being granted a release from the final 1 1/2 years of his Dragons contract.
