= Corey Thompson =

Australian rugby league footballer (born 1990)

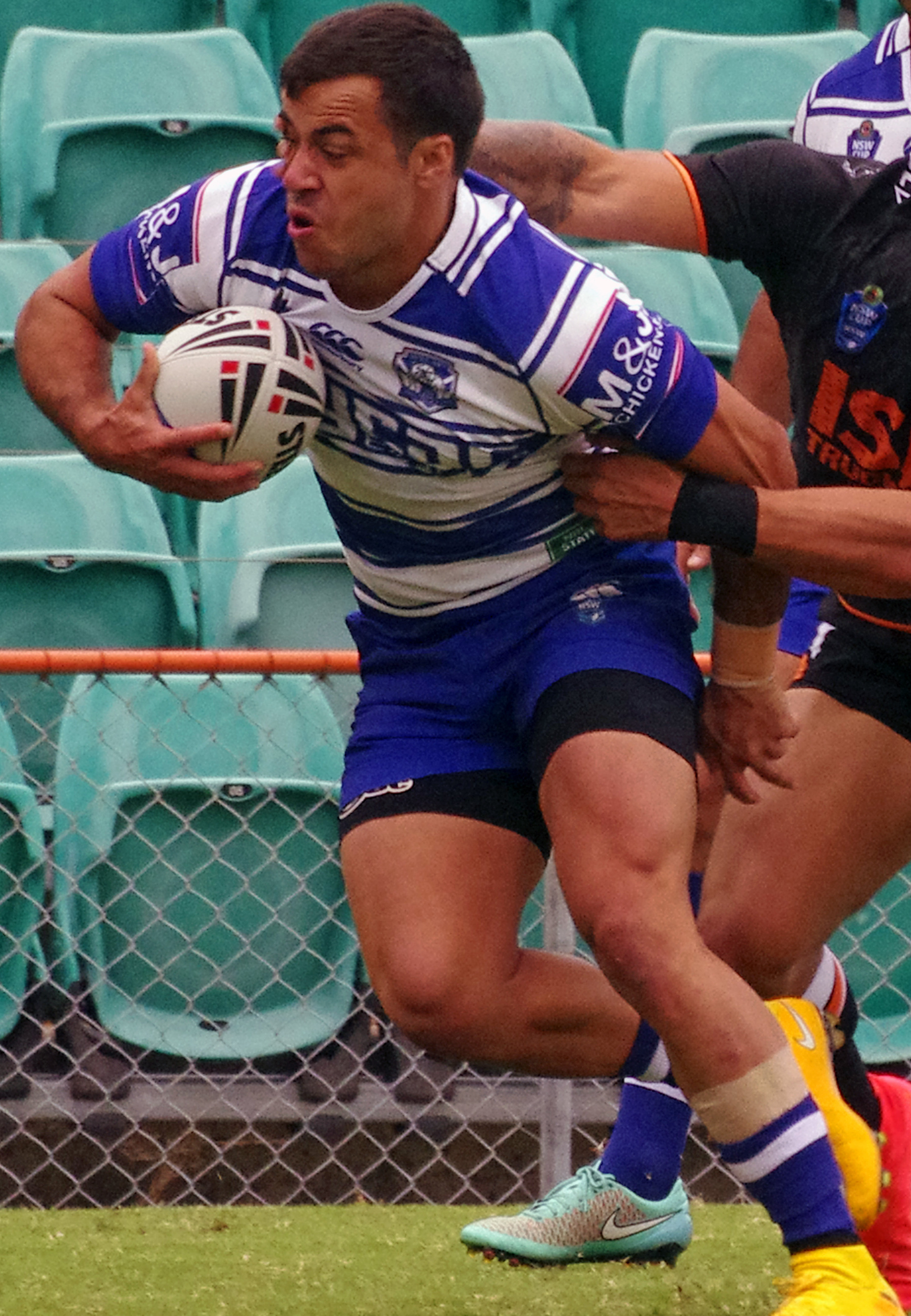

Personal information
- Born: 15 May 1990 (age 36) Brisbane, Queensland, Australia

Playing information
- Height: 178 cm (5 ft 10 in)
- Weight: 91 kg (14 st 5 lb)
- Position: Wing, Fullback
Club
Years	Team	Pld	T	G	FG	P
2014–15	Canterbury Bulldogs	35	15	0	0	60
2016–17	Widnes Vikings	58	41	9	0	182
2018–20	Wests Tigers	44	19	0	0	76
2020–22	Gold Coast Titans	43	13	0	0	52
	Total	180	88	9	0	370
Representative
Years	Team	Pld	T	G	FG	P
2021	Indigenous All Stars	1	0	0	0	0

Corey Thompson (born 15 May 1990) is an Australian former professional rugby league footballer who plays as a winger and fullback for the Brisbane Tigers in the Queensland Cup.

He previously played for the Canterbury-Bankstown Bulldogs, Wests Tigers and the Gold Coast Titans in the National Rugby League, and the Widnes Vikings in the Super League.

== Background ==
Thompson was born in Brisbane, Queensland, Australia, and is an Indigenous Australian.

He played his junior football for Easts Mount Gravatt, before joining the Souths Logan Magpies.

== Playing career ==
=== Early career ===
In 2010 and 2011, Thompson played for the Souths Logan Magpies in the Queensland Cup. In 2012, he joined the Eastern Suburbs Tigers, giving him the chance to do a pre-season with National Rugby League team Melbourne Storm. The Storm attempted to sign Thompson but couldn't fit him under their salary cap. In 2013, he played games for ICONZ Rugby in an Australian Rugby sevens tournament. In April 2013, while playing for the Eastern Suburbs Tigers, he signed a 2-year contract with the Canterbury-Bankstown Bulldogs starting effective immediately.

=== 2014 ===
In Round 1, Thompson made his NRL debut for Canterbury-Bankstown against the Brisbane Broncos. In September, Thompson re-signed with Canterbury on a 1-year contract. Thompson made a total of 25 appearances for Canterbury in 2014 including the 2014 NRL Grand Final which the club lost 30-6 against South Sydney at ANZ Stadium.

=== 2015 ===
On 16 August, Thompson signed a 2-year contract with Super League team Widnes.

=== 2016 ===
In the 2016 season. Corey scored 27 tries for the Vikings, meaning he was the second highest try scorer in the league behind Denny Solomona of the Castleford Tigers. Corey helped his team to a 7th-place finish in Super League.

=== 2018 ===
Thompson returned to the NRL with the Wests Tigers. With Tuimoala Lolohea pencilled in as fullback, Thompson was said to being adding "further depth" to the team. However, Thompson was named at fullback for the last trial before the season began, with coach Ivan Cleary saying post-match, "I couldn't have asked for more from him really. He was in everything tonight. Corey's been a standout right throughout the pre-season."

With Lolohea selected at fullback for the round 1, Thompson was chosen on the right wing ahead of regular winger David Nofoaluma. Near the end of the game, he scored a match-winning "freakish try finished with polish" as Wests Tigers defeated the Sydney Roosters 10-8. After Lolohea suffered a knee injury, Thompson was named at fullback for round 2. Described as the, "early contender for bargain buy of the season". Thompson signed an upgraded contract for 2019. He continued to switch between fullback and winger, making 20 straight appearances before a season-ending ankle injury. Despite the premature end, he was the club's leading try-scorer with 9.

=== 2019 ===
In Round 2 of the 2019 NRL season, Thompson scored 2 tries as Wests defeated the New Zealand Warriors 34-6 at Campbelltown Stadium. In Round 19 against Newcastle, Thompson scored 2 tries as Wests won the match 28-26 at the Newcastle International Sports Centre.

Thompson finished the season making 22 appearances and scoring 9 tries as the club ended the year in 9th spot and missed out on the finals.

=== 2020 ===
On 15 June, Thompson signed a three-year deal with the Gold Coast Titans after being granted a immediate release from the Wests Tigers. Thompson would go on to play 12 games for the Gold Coast in the 2020 NRL season.

=== 2021 ===
Thompson played 18 games for the Gold Coast in the 2021 NRL season including the clubs elimination final loss to the Sydney Roosters.

=== 2022 ===
Thompson made 13 appearances for the Gold Coast in the 2022 NRL season scoring one try. The Gold Coast would finish the season 13th on the table and miss the finals. On 10 November, Thompson signed a contract to join Queensland Cup side the Brisbane Tigers, and ultimately played fullback in the Tigers 22-18 victory over Burleigh in the 2023 grand final.

== Statistics ==
Year	Team	Games	Tries	Goals	Pts
2014	Canterbury-Bankstown Bulldogs	25	10		40
2015	Canterbury-Bankstown Bulldogs	10	5		20
2016	Widnes Vikings	33	28	6	124
2017	Widnes Vikings	24	13	3	58
2018	Wests Tigers	20	9		36
2019	Wests Tigers	22	9		36
2020	Wests Tigers	2	1		4
2020	Gold Coast Titans	12	4		16
2021	Gold Coast Titans	18	8		32
2022	Gold Coast Titans	13	1		4
	Totals	180	88	9	370
