= Brad Walker (rugby league) =

English rugby league footballer

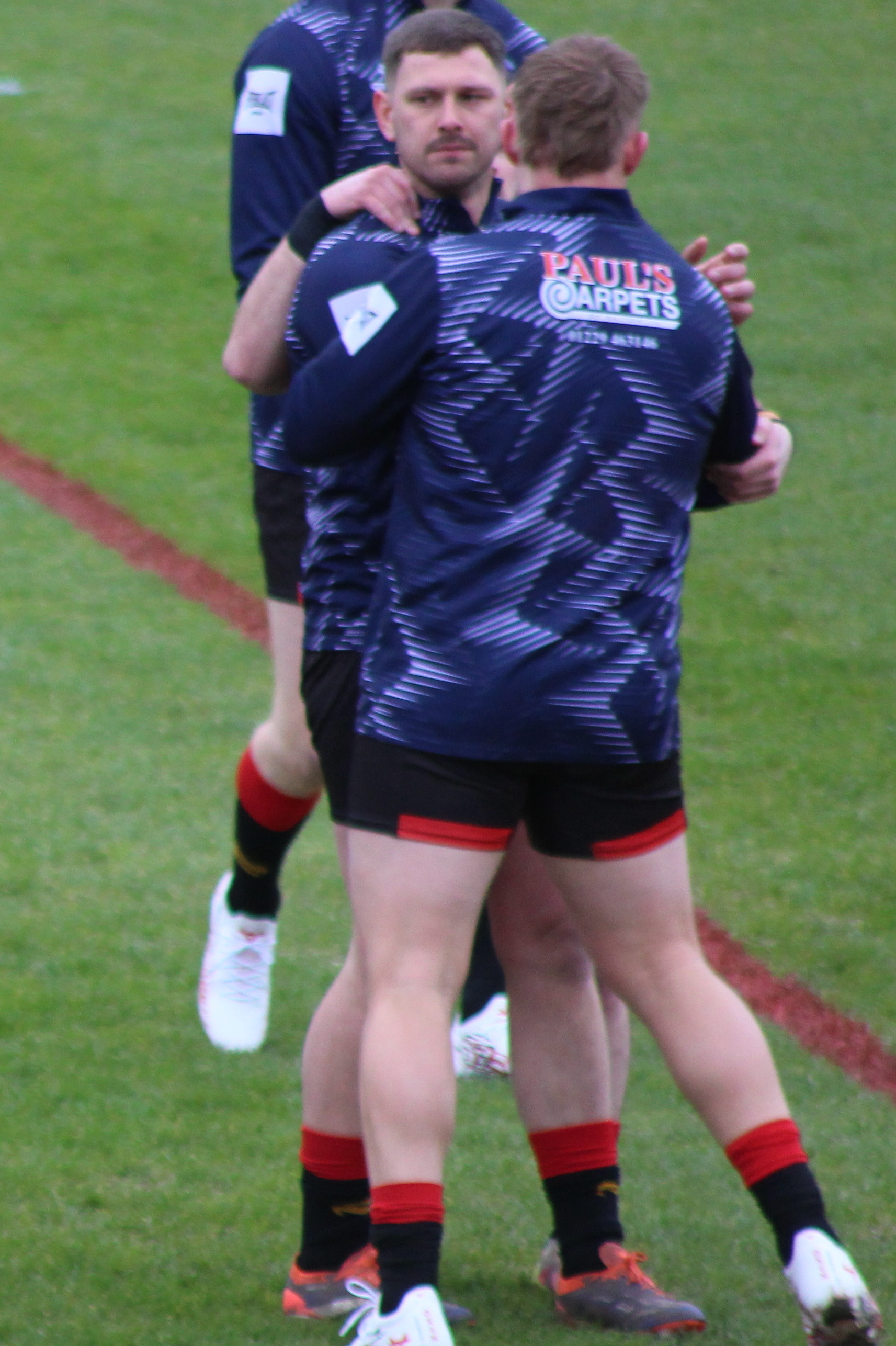

Personal information
- Full name: Bradley Walker
- Born: 30 January 1998 (age 28) Barrow-in-Furness, Cumbria, England
- Height: 6 ft 0 in (1.84 m)
- Weight: 16 st 3 lb (103 kg)

Playing information
- Position: Loose forward, Stand-off
Club
Years	Team	Pld	T	G	FG	P
2016–19	Widnes Vikings	40	6	0	0	24
2018(loan)	→ North Wales Crusaders	10	2	7	1	23
2020–22	Wakefield Trinity	31	1	4	0	12
2020(loan)	→ Newcastle Thunder	1	0	0	0	0
2023	Keighley Cougars	22	0	8	0	16
2024–	Barrow Raiders	54	9	64	4	168
	Total	158	18	83	5	243
Representative
Years	Team	Pld	T	G	FG	P
2025	Cumbria	0	0	0	0	0
- Source: As of 31 October 2025

Brad Walker (born 30 January 1998) is an English semi-professional rugby league footballer who plays as a loose forward and second-row forward for the Barrow Raiders in the Championship.

He previously played for the Widnes Vikings in the Super League and Championship, and spent time on loan from Widnes at the North Wales Crusaders in League 1. He played for Wakefield Trinity in the Super League and also spent time on loan from Wakefield at the Newcastle Thunder in League 1.

== Background ==
He was born in Barrow-in-Furness, Cumbria, England.

== Playing career ==
=== Widnes Vikings ===
On 9 Jun 2016, he made his Widnes Super League début coming off the bench in the Round 18 28-28 victory over the Castleford Tigers.

=== Barrow Raiders ===
On 8 December 2023 it was reported that he had signed for Barrow in the RFL Championship on a two-year deal.
