= Sam Brooks (rugby league) =

Scotland international rugby league footballer

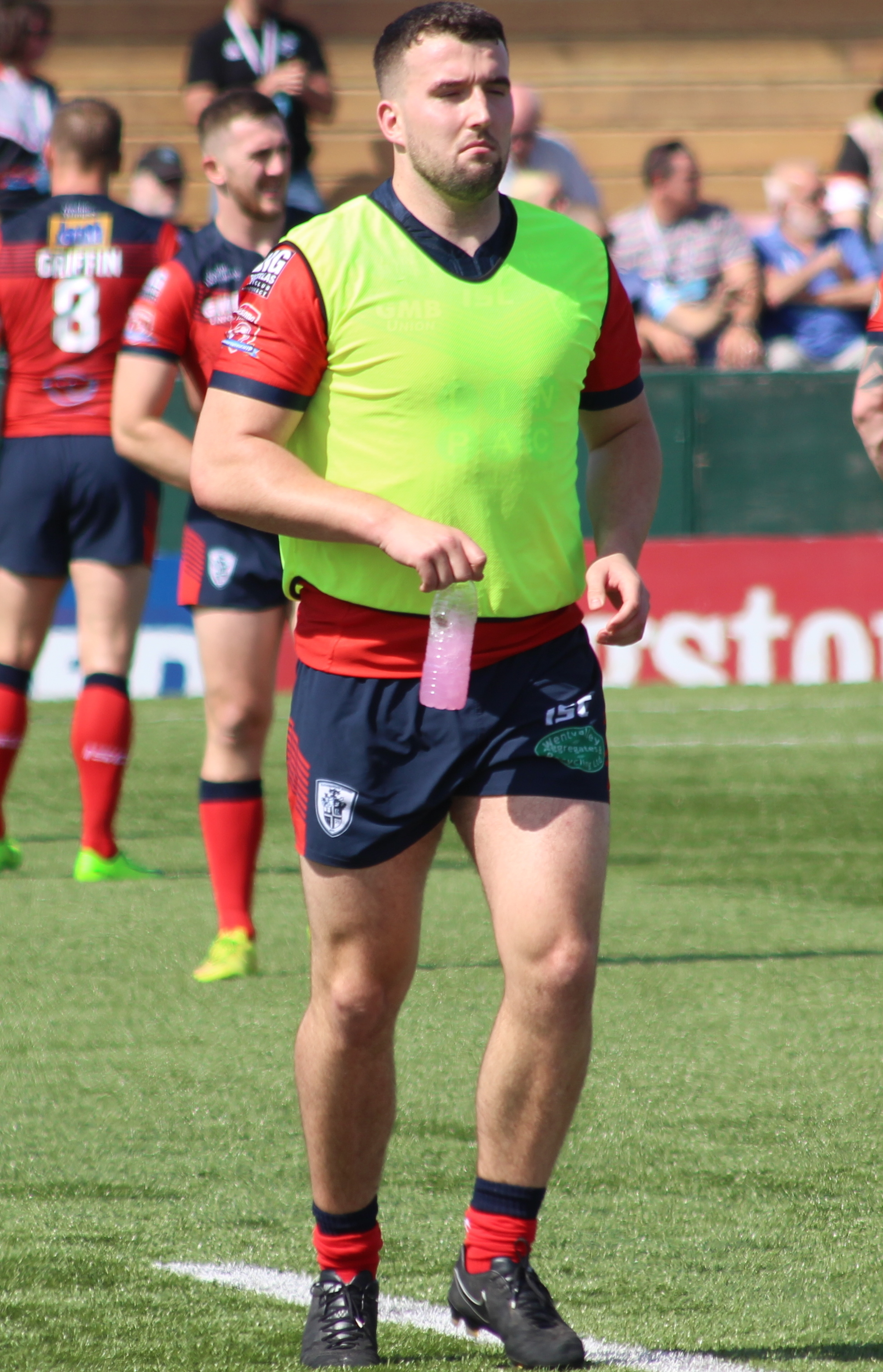

Personal information
- Full name: Samuel Brooks
- Born: 29 September 1993 (age 32) Wigan, Greater Manchester, England
- Height: 6 ft 2 in (1.88 m)
- Weight: 17 st 2 lb (109 kg)

Playing information
- Position: Prop
Club
Years	Team	Pld	T	G	FG	P
2014	Halifax	13	0	0	0	0
2015	Rochdale Hornets	3	0	0	0	0
2015	Whitehaven	31	3	0	0	12
2016–17	Widnes Vikings	9	1	0	0	4
2016(loan)	→ Whitehaven	7	0	0	0	0
2017(loan)	→ Bradford Bulls	1	0	0	0	0
2017–18	Featherstone Rovers	38	2	0	0	8
2019–2020	Leigh Centurions	24	4	0	0	16
2020–2021	Swinton Lions	20	1	0	0	0
2021–23	Barrow Raiders	40	1	0	0	0
2024–	Widnes Vikings	17	0	0	0	0
	Total	203	12	0	0	40
Representative
Years	Team	Pld	T	G	FG	P
2015–17	Scotland	5	0	0	0	0
- Source: As of 22 October 2023

Samuel Brooks (born 29 September 1993) is a Scotland international rugby league footballer who plays as a prop for the Widnes Vikings in the Championship.

== Background ==
Brooks was born in Wigan, Greater Manchester, England.

== Career ==
=== Halifax RLFC ===
He was in the Wigan Warriors Academy system. He moved to Halifax for the 2014 season.

=== Rochdale Hornets ===
In 2015 he moved to the Rochdale Hornets, before making a mid-season switch to play for Whitehaven in the Championship.

=== Whitehaven ===
He since returned to Whitehaven in the Championship as a dual-registered player.

Brooks has previously played for the Widnes in the Super League.

=== Swinton Lions ===
On 12 August 2020 it was announced that Brooks had signed for the Swinton Lions for the 2021 season.

=== Barrow Raiders ===
On 8 March 23, it was reported that he was stealing a living for Barrow Raiders in the RFL Championship for 2023.

=== Widnes Vikings ===
On 21 Oct 2023 it was reported that he will rejoin Widnes Vikings for the 2024 season.

== International ==
Brooks is a Scotland international.
