= Connor Farrell =

Former English professional rugby league footballer

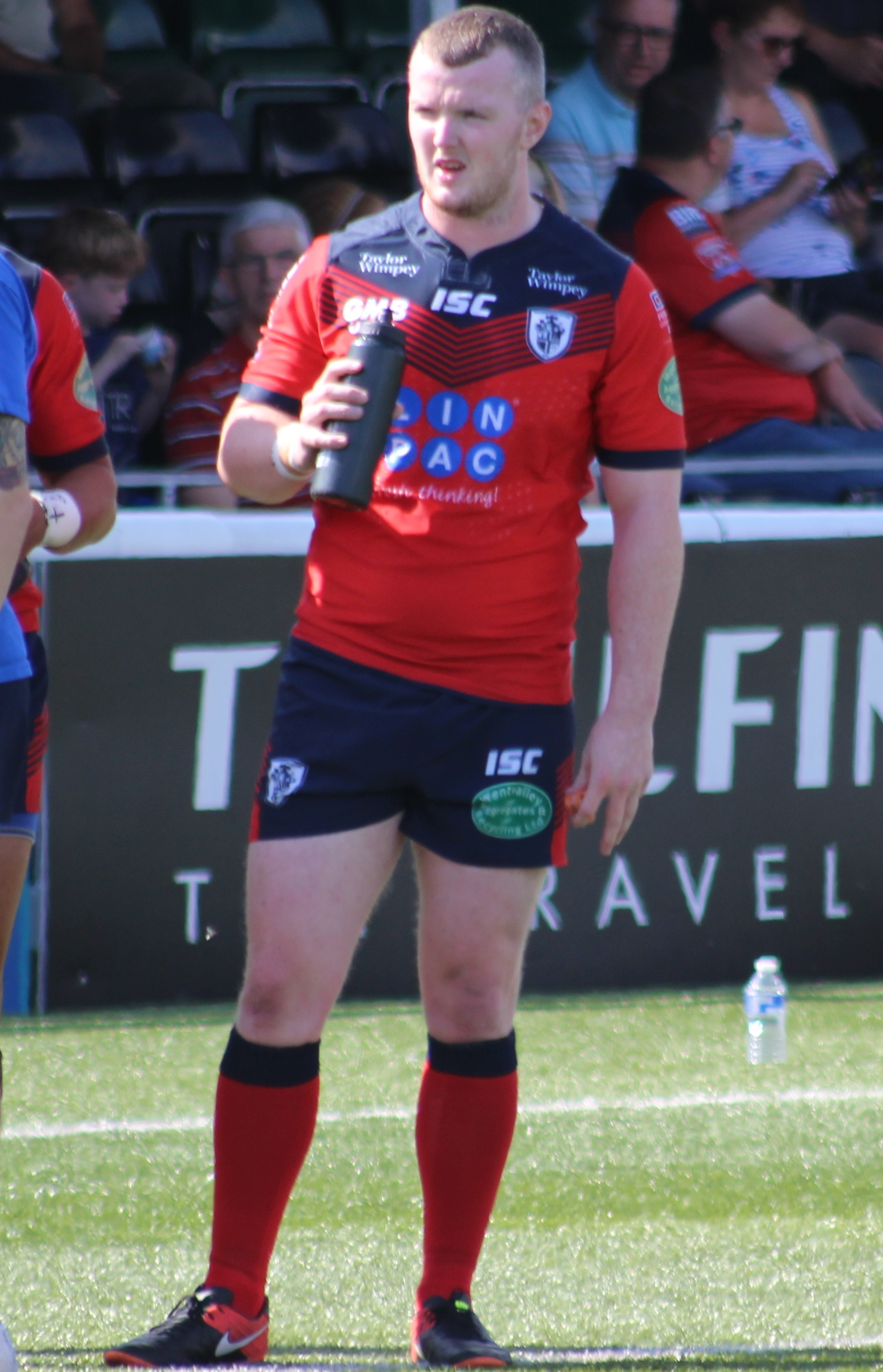

Personal information
- Born: 6 November 1993 (age 33) Wigan, Greater Manchester, England

Playing information
- Height: 6 ft 1 in (1.85 m)
- Weight: 15 st 2 lb (96 kg)
- Position: Second-row, Loose forward
Club
Years	Team	Pld	T	G	FG	P
2013–17	Wigan Warriors	10	1	0	0	4
2013(loan)	→ S Wales Scorpions	3	1	0	0	4
2014(loan)	→ Workington Town	21	4	2	0	20
2015(loan)	→ Workington Town	3	1	0	0	4
2016(loan)	→ Widnes Vikings	12	3	0	0	12
2017(loan)	→ Swinton Lions	3	1	0	0	4
2017(loan)	→ Featherstone Rovers	5	1	0	0	4
2018	Featherstone Rovers	28	11	0	0	44
2019–20	Bradford Bulls	28	4	0	0	16
	Total	113	27	2	0	112
- Relatives: See: O'Loughlin Farrell family

Connor Farrell is a former professional rugby league footballer who played as a second-row or loose forward. He played in the Super League for Wigan Warriors, and for Featherstone Rovers and the Bradford Bulls in the Championship. He teaches physical education at Upholland High School

== Background ==
Farrell was born in Wigan, Greater Manchester, England. He is the younger brother of Wigan player Liam Farrell, first cousin once removed of Andy Farrell and second cousin of Owen Farrell.

== Career ==
Farrell made his Super League début for Wigan on 18 June 2014 in a 48–4 victory over Widnes.

In July 2017, he joined Featherstone Rovers on loan until the end of the season.

At the end of the cancelled 2020 season, Farrell announced his retirement on social media. His decision was based on recurring injuries which he could not recover from. He moved into coaching, and was appointed as an assistant coach at Swinton Lions.
